= Results of the 2021 German federal election =

2021 German federal election
- 26 September 2021
- All 736 seats in the Bundestag; 368 seats needed for a majority
- Turnout: 76.6% ▲0.4pp
Party	Leader	Vote %	Seats	+/–
SPD	Olaf Scholz	25.7%	205	+52
CDU/CSU	Armin Laschet	24.1%	198	−48
Greens	Annalena Baerbock	14.7%	118	+51
FDP	Christian Lindner	11.4%	91	+11
AfD	A. Weidel/T. Chrupalla	10.4%	83	−11
Left	W. Baier/D. Bartsch	4.9%	39	−30
SSW	Stefan Seidler	0.1%	1	+1
This lists parties that won seats. See the complete results below.
Results for the single-member constituencies
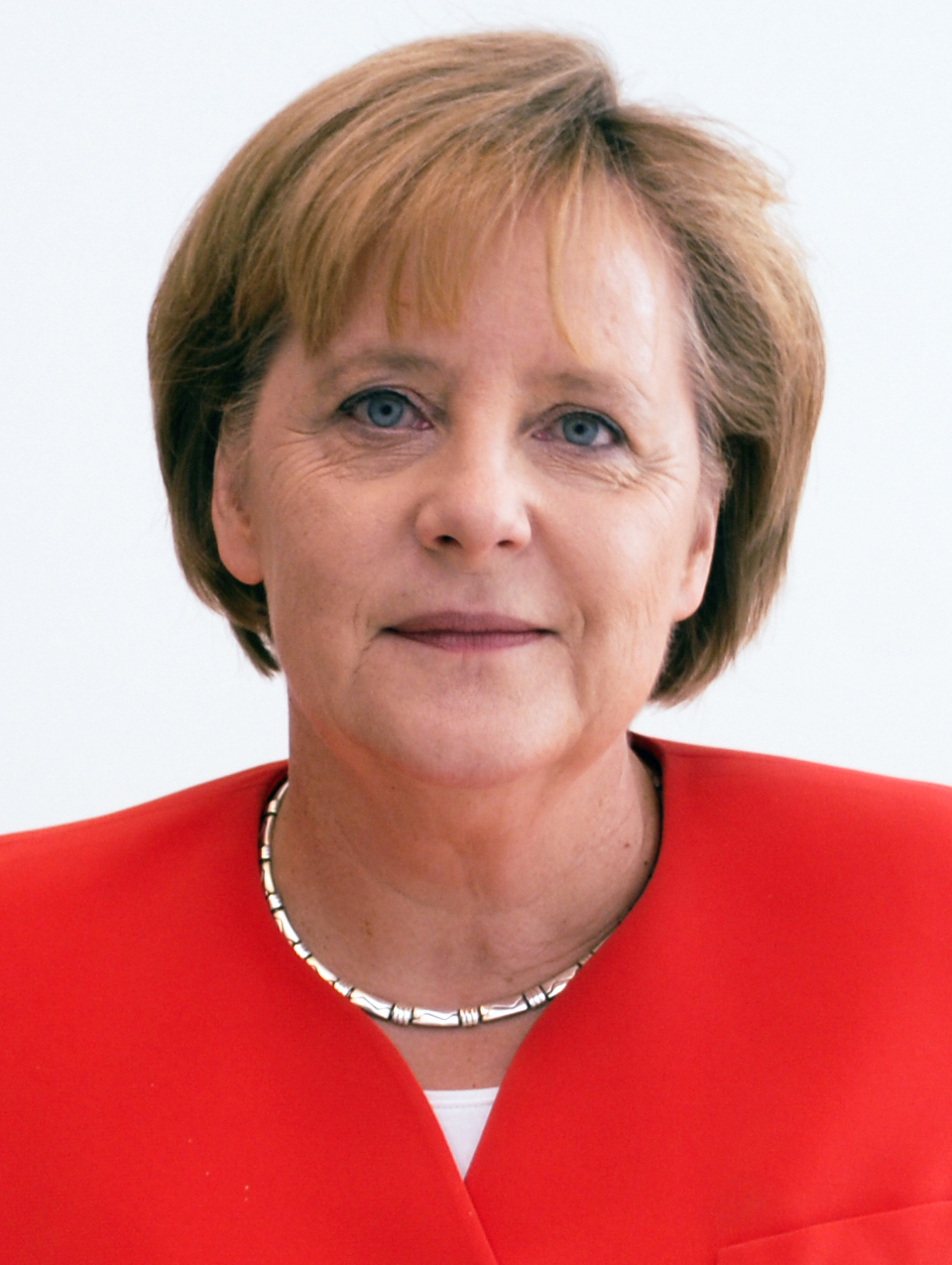

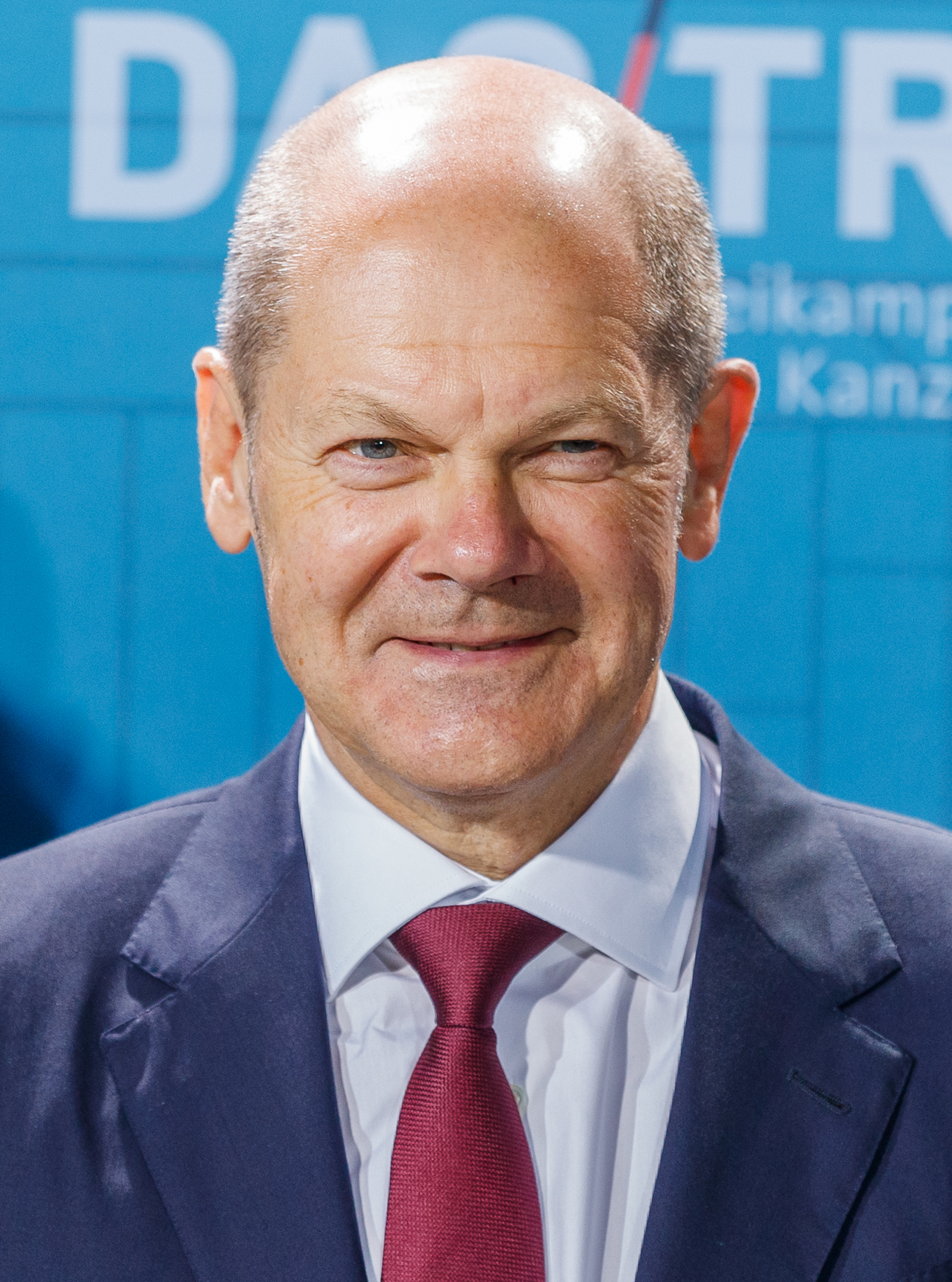
Chancellor before	Chancellor after
Angela Merkel; CDU/CSU	Olaf Scholz; SPD

This is a breakdown of the results of the 2021 German federal election. The following tables display detailed results in each of the sixteen states and all 299 single-member constituencies.

== Electoral system ==
Germany uses the mixed-member proportional representation system, a system of proportional representation combined with elements of first-past-the-post voting. The Bundestag has 598 nominal members, elected for a four-year term; these seats are distributed between the sixteen German states in proportion to the states' number of eligible voters.

Every elector has two votes: a constituency vote (first vote) and a party list vote (second vote). Based solely on the first votes, 299 members are elected in single-member constituencies by first-past-the-post voting (Direktmandat). The second votes are used to produce a proportional number of seats for parties, first in the states, and then in the Bundestag. Seats are allocated using the Sainte-Laguë method. If a party wins fewer constituency seats in a state than its second votes would entitle it to, it receives additional seats from the relevant state list. Parties can file lists in every single state under certain conditions, such as a fixed number of supporting signatures. Parties can receive second votes only in those states in which they have filed a state list. If a party, by winning single-member constituencies in one state, receives more seats than it would be entitled to according to its second vote share in that state (so-called overhang seats), the other parties receive compensation seats. Owing to this provision, the Bundestag usually has more than 598 members; 735 seats were awarded in this election, up from 709 seats in 2017. The 19th Bundestag elected in 2017 had 709 seats: 598 regular seats and 111 overhang and compensation seats. Overhang seats are calculated at the state level, so many more seats are added to balance this out among the states, adding more seats than would be needed to compensate for overhang at the national level in order to avoid negative vote weight.

In order to qualify for seats based on the party-list vote share, a party must either win three single-member constituencies via first votes or exceed a threshold of 5% of the second votes nationwide. If a party only wins one or two single-member constituencies and fails to get at least 5% of the second votes, it keeps the single-member seat(s), but other parties that accomplish at least one of the two threshold conditions receive compensation seats. The most recent example of this was in 2002, when the PDS won only 4.0% of the second votes nationwide but won two constituencies in the state of Berlin. The same applies if an independent candidate wins a single-member constituency, which has not happened since 1949. If a voter cast a first vote for a successful independent candidate or a successful candidate whose party failed to qualify for proportional representation, his or her second vote does not count toward proportional representation; however, it counts toward whether the elected party exceeds the 5% threshold. Parties representing recognized national minorities (currently Danes, Frisians, Sorbs, and Romani people) are exempt from the 5% threshold.

== Nationwide ==
Party	Party-list			Constituency			Total seats	+/–
Party	Votes	%	Seats	Votes	%	Seats	Total seats	+/–
Social Democratic Party	11,901,556	25.71	85	12,184,094	26.36	121	206	+53
Christian Democratic Union	8,774,919	18.95	54	10,445,923	22.60	98	152	−48
Alliance 90/The Greens	6,814,401	14.72	102	6,435,360	13.92	16	118	+51
Free Democratic Party	5,291,010	11.43	91	4,019,562	8.70	0	92	+11
Alternative for Germany	4,809,228	10.39	67	4,699,917	10.17	16	83	−11
Christian Social Union	2,402,827	5.19	0	2,788,048	6.03	45	45	−1
The Left	2,255,860	4.87	36	2,286,070	4.95	3	39	−30
Free Voters	1,125,666	2.43	0	1,332,707	2.88	0	0	0
Human Environment Animal Protection Party	673,669	1.46	0	160,863	0.35	0	0	0
Grassroots Democratic Party	630,153	1.36	0	732,620	1.59	0	0	New
Die PARTEI	460,429	0.99	0	540,165	1.17	0	0	0
Team Todenhöfer	211,860	0.46	0	5,422	0.01	0	0	New
Pirate Party Germany	169,591	0.37	0	60,550	0.13	0	0	0
Volt Germany	164,272	0.35	0	77,594	0.17	0	0	New
Ecological Democratic Party	112,131	0.24	0	152,540	0.33	0	0	0
National Democratic Party	64,360	0.14	0	1,090	0.00	0	0	0
South Schleswig Voters' Association	55,578	0.12	1	35,027	0.08	0	1	+1
Partei für Gesundheitsforschung	48,495	0.10	0	2,173	0.00	0	0	0
Party of Humanists	47,526	0.10	0	12,672	0.03	0	0	0
Alliance C – Christians for Germany	39,868	0.09	0	6,222	0.01	0	0	0
Bavaria Party	32,790	0.07	0	36,748	0.08	0	0	0
V-Partei3	31,762	0.07	0	10,644	0.02	0	0	0
Independents for Citizen-oriented Democracy	22,736	0.05	0	13,421	0.03	0	0	0
The Greys – For All Generations	17,304	0.04	0	1,958	0.00	0	0	0
Die Urbane. Eine HipHop Partei	17,737	0.04	0	1,890	0.00	0	0	0
Marxist–Leninist Party	17,819	0.04	0	22,538	0.05	0	0	0
German Communist Party	14,951	0.03	0	5,446	0.01	0	0	0
Alliance for Human Rights, Animal and Nature Protection	13,672	0.03	0	7,371	0.02	0	0	0
European Party Love	12,967	0.03	0	873	0.00	0	0	New
Liberal Conservative Reformers	11,327	0.02	0	11,003	0.02	0	0	New
Lobbyists for Children	9,189	0.02	0				0	New
Third Way	7,832	0.02	0	515	0.00	0	0	New
Garden Party	7,611	0.02	0	2,095	0.00	0	0	0
Citizens' Movement	7,491	0.02	0	1,556	0.00	0	0	New
Democracy in Motion	7,184	0.02	0	2,609	0.01	0	0	0
Menschliche Welt	3,786	0.01	0	651	0.00	0	0	0
The Pinks/Alliance 21	3,488	0.01	0	373	0.00	0	0	New
Party of Progress	3,228	0.01	0				0	New
Socialist Equality Party	1,400	0.00	0				0	0
Bürgerrechtsbewegung Solidarität	665	0.00	0	811	0.00	0	0	0
Klimaliste Baden-Württemberg				3,967	0.01	0	0	New
Family Party				1,817	0.00	0	0	0
From now... Democracy by Referendum				1,086	0.00	0	0	0
Grey Panthers				961	0.00	0	0	New
Thuringian Homeland Party				549	0.00	0	0	New
The Others				251	0.00	0	0	New
Bergpartei, die "ÜberPartei"				191	0.00	0	0	0
Independents and voter groups				110,875	0.24	0	0	0
Total	46,298,338	100.00	436	46,218,818	100.00	299	736	+27
Valid votes	46,298,338	99.12		46,218,818	98.95			
Invalid/blank votes	408,976	0.88		488,496	1.05			
Total votes	46,707,314	100.00		46,707,314	100.00			
Registered voters/turnout	61,172,771	76.35		61,172,771	76.35			
Source: Bundeswahlleiter

Popular vote
SPD	25.74%
CDU/CSU	24.07%
GRÜNE	14.75%
FDP	11.46%
AfD	10.34%
DIE LINKE	4.89%
FREIE WÄHLER	2.43%
Tierschutzpartei	1.45%
dieBasis	1.36%
Die PARTEI	0.99%
Other	2.51%

Bundestag seats
SPD	27.99%
CDU/CSU	26.77%
GRÜNE	16.03%
FDP	12.50%
AfD	11.28%
DIE LINKE	5.30%
SSW	0.14%

== Leaders' races ==
Party	Name	Constituency	Votes	%	Position	Elected?
SPD	Olaf Scholz	Potsdam – Potsdam-Mittelmark II – Teltow-Fläming II	64,271	34.0	1st	Elected
CDU/CSU	Armin Laschet	North Rhine-Westphalia party list			1st	Elected on list
GRÜNE	Annalena Baerbock	Potsdam – Potsdam-Mittelmark II – Teltow-Fläming II	35,452	18.8	2nd	Elected on list
GRÜNE	Robert Habeck	Flensburg – Schleswig	50,231	28.1	1st	Elected
FDP	Christian Lindner	Rheinisch-Bergischer Kreis	29,576	16.8	4th	Elected on list
AfD	Alice Weidel	Bodensee	12,584	9.2	5th	Elected on list
AfD	Tino Chrupalla	Görlitz	53,970	35.8	1st	Elected
LINKE	Janine Wissler	Frankfurt am Main I	12,562	8.8	5th	Elected on list
LINKE	Dietmar Bartsch	Rostock – Landkreis Rostock II	29,715	18.2	2nd	Elected on list

== By state ==
=== Summary ===
Winning party by constituency.

Results of the party list vote by state.

List seats by state.

Party list vote share by state
State	SPD	Union	Grüne	FDP	AfD	Linke	Others
Schleswig-Holstein	28.0	22.0	18.3	12.5	6.8	3.6	8.7
Mecklenburg-Vorpommern	29.1	17.4	7.8	8.2	18.0	11.1	8.4
Hamburg	29.7	15.4	24.9	11.4	5.0	6.7	6.9
Lower Saxony	33.1	24.2	16.1	10.5	7.4	3.3	5.4
Bremen	31.5	17.2	20.9	9.3	6.9	7.7	6.4
Brandenburg	29.5	15.3	9.0	9.3	18.1	8.5	10.3
Saxony-Anhalt	25.4	21.0	6.5	9.5	19.6	9.6	8.4
Berlin	22.2	17.2	22.0	8.1	9.4	11.5	9.4
North Rhine-Westphalia	29.1	26.0	16.1	11.4	7.3	3.7	6.5
Saxony	19.3	17.2	8.6	11.0	24.6	9.3	9.9
Hesse	27.6	22.8	15.8	12.8	8.8	4.3	7.9
Thuringia	23.4	16.9	6.6	9.0	24.0	11.4	8.7
Rhineland-Palatinate	29.4	24.7	12.6	11.7	9.2	3.3	9.2
Bavaria	18.0	31.7	14.1	10.5	9.0	2.8	13.9
Baden-Württemberg	21.6	24.8	17.2	15.3	9.6	3.3	8.2
Saarland	37.3	23.6	–	11.5	10.0	7.2	10.5

Seats by state
State	Distribution	Total
Schleswig-Holstein	1 / 8 / 6 / 1 / 4 / 6 / 2	28
Mecklenburg-Vorpommern	2 / 6 / 1 / 1 / 3 / 3	16
Hamburg	1 / 5 / 4 / 2 / 3 / 1	16
Lower Saxony	3 / 26 / 13 / 8 / 18 / 6	74
Bremen	2 / 1 / 1 / 1	5
Brandenburg	2 / 10 / 2 / 2 / 4 / 5	25
Saxony-Anhalt	2 / 5 / 1 / 2 / 4 / 4	18
Berlin	3 / 6 / 6 / 2 / 5 / 3	25
North Rhine-Westphalia	6 / 49 / 28 / 19 / 42 / 12	156
Saxony	4 / 8 / 4 / 5 / 7 / 10	38
Hesse	3 / 15 / 9 / 7 / 12 / 5	51
Thuringia	3 / 5 / 1 / 2 / 3 / 5	19
Rhineland-Palatinate	1 / 12 / 5 / 5 / 9 / 4	36
Bavaria	4 / 23 / 19 / 14 / 45 / 12	117
Baden-Württemberg	3 / 22 / 18 / 16 / 33 / 10	102
Saarland	1 / 4 / 1 / 2 / 1	9
Germany	39 / 206 / 118 / 1 / 91 / 197 / 83	735

=== Schleswig-Holstein ===
Party	Constituency			Party list			Total seats	+/–
Party	Votes	%	Seats	Votes	%	Seats	Total seats	+/–
Social Democratic Party (SPD)	530,301	30.1	8	494,055	28.0	0	8	+2
Christian Democratic Union (CDU)	465,975	26.5	2	388,399	22.0	4	6	−4
Alliance 90/The Greens (GRÜNE)	315,633	17.9	1	322,763	18.3	5	6	+3
Free Democratic Party (FDP)	167,191	9.5	0	220,039	12.5	4	4	+1
Alternative for Germany (AfD)	113,641	6.5	0	119,566	6.8	2	2	0
The Left (DIE LINKE)	55,523	3.2	0	64,238	3.6	1	1	−1
South Schleswig Voters' Association (SSW)	35,027	2.0	0	55,578	3.2	1	1	+1
Grassroots Democratic Party	27,124	1.5	0	23,407	1.3	0	0	New
Human Environment Animal Protection Party	–	–	–	20,653	1.2	0	0	0
Die PARTEI	18,090	1.0	0	17,870	1.0	0	0	0
Free Voters	26,518	1.5	0	17,043	1.0	0	0	0
Team Todenhöfer	–	–	–	5,305	0.3	0	0	New
Volt Germany	1,431	0.1	0	4,157	0.2	0	0	New
National Democratic Party	–	–	–	2,034	0.1	0	0	0
The Humanists	–	–	–	1,763	0.1	0	0	0
V-Partei³	581	0.0	0	1,763	0.1	0	0	0
Ecological Democratic Party	–	–	–	1,539	0.1	0	0	0
The Urbans. A HipHop Party	727	0.0	0	1,029	0.1	0	0	0
Liberal Conservative Reformers	1,051	0.1	0	715	0.0	0	0	New
German Communist Party	326	0.0	0	516	0.0	0	0	0
Marxist–Leninist Party	265	0.0	0	322	0.0	0	0	0
Independents & voter groups	609	0.0	0	–	–	–	0	–
Invalid/blank votes	16,132	–	–	13,391	–	–	–	–
Total	1,776,145	100	11	1,776,145	100	17	28	+2
Registered voters/turnout	2,272,717	78.2	–	2,272,717	78.2	–	–	–
Source: Federal Returning Officer

Constituency members
#	Constituency	Previous member	Elected member	Party	Votes	%	Margin	Runner-up
1	Flensburg – Schleswig	Petra Nicolaisen	Robert Habeck	GRÜNE	50,231	28.1	8,510	Petra Nicolaisen
2	Nordfriesland – Dithmarschen Nord	Astrid Damerow	Astrid Damerow	CDU	43,745	30.4	3,719	Jens Peter Jensen
3	Steinburg – Dithmarschen Süd	Mark Helfrich	Mark Helfrich	CDU	39,431	29.2	52	Karin Thissen
4	Rendsburg-Eckernförde	Johann Wadephul	Sönke Rix	SPD	49,474	30.8	1,786	Johann Wadephul
5	Kiel	Mathias Stein	Mathias Stein	SPD	45,709	29.5	2,177	Luise Amtsberg
6	Plön – Neumünster	Melanie Bernstein	Kristian Klinck	SPD	41,497	31.4	4,627	Melanie Bernstein
7	Pinneberg	Michael von Abercron	Ralf Stegner	SPD	59,298	31.2	9,588	Michael von Abercron
8	Segeberg – Stormarn-Mitte	Gero Storjohann	Bengt Bergt	SPD	63,369	32.0	8,104	Gero Storjohann
9	Ostholstein – Stormarn-Nord	Ingo Gädechens	Bettina Hagedorn	SPD	47,714	33.7	4,723	Ingo Gädechens
10	Herzogtum Lauenburg – Stormarn-Süd	Norbert Brackmann	Nina Scheer	SPD	60,593	31.0	8,721	Thomas Peters
11	Lübeck	Claudia Schmidtke	Tim Klüssendorf	SPD	44,315	34.1	16,049	Claudia Schmidtke

List members
GRÜNE	CDU	FDP
1. Luise Amtsberg (1); 2. Ingrid Nestle (3); 3. Konstantin von Notz (4); 4. Denise Loop (5); 5. Bruno Hönel (6)	1. Johann Wadephul (1); 2. Ingo Gädechens (3); 3. Petra Nicolaisen (4); 4. Gero Storjohann (5)	1. Wolfgang Kubicki (1); 2. Gyde Jensen (2); 3. Christine Aschenberg-Dugnus (3); 4. Maximilian Mordhorst (4)
AfD	LINKE	SSW
1. Uwe Witt (1); 2. Gereon Bollmann (2)	1. Cornelia Möhring (1)	1. Stefan Seidler (1)

=== Mecklenburg-Vorpommern ===
Party	Constituency			Party list			Total seats	+/–
Party	Votes	%	Seats	Votes	%	Seats	Total seats	+/–
Social Democratic Party (SPD)	261,408	28.5	6	267,368	29.1	0	6	+4
Alternative for Germany (AfD)	169,977	18.5	0	165,342	18.0	3	3	0
Christian Democratic Union (CDU)	180,669	19.7	0	160,103	17.4	3	3	−3
The Left (DIE LINKE)	116,033	12.6	0	101,735	11.1	2	2	−1
Free Democratic Party (FDP)	66,328	7.2	0	75,555	8.2	1	1	0
Alliance 90/The Greens (GRÜNE)	62,664	6.8	0	71,956	7.8	1	1	0
Human Environment Animal Protection Party	14,324	1.6	0	20,582	2.2	0	0	0
Grassroots Democratic Party	16,019	1.7	0	16,336	1.8	0	0	New
Free Voters	17,781	1.9	0	13,344	1.5	0	0	0
Die PARTEI	3,692	0.4	0	7,900	0.9	0	0	0
National Democratic Party	–	–	–	6,400	0.7	0	0	0
Pirate Party Germany	3,812	0.4	0	4,259	0.5	0	0	0
Team Todenhöfer	–	–	–	2,146	0.2	0	0	New
Volt Germany	–	–	–	1,904	0.2	0	0	New
The Humanists	–	–	–	1,277	0.1	0	0	0
Ecological Democratic Party	–	–	–	1,189	0.1	0	0	0
German Communist Party	–	–	–	754	0.1	0	0	0
Marxist–Leninist Party	1,270	0.1	0	709	0.1	0	0	0
Independents for Citizen-oriented Democracy	1,019	0.1	0	–	–	–	0	New
Independents & voter groups	3,090	0.3	0	–	–	–	0	–
Invalid/blank votes	16,954	–	–	16,181	–	–	–	–
Total	935,040	100	6	935,040	100	10	16	0
Registered voters/turnout	1,314,435	71.1	–	1,314,435	71.1	–	–	–
Source: Federal Returning Officer

Constituency members
#	Constituency	Previous member	Elected member	Party	Votes	%	Margin	Runner-up
12	Schwerin – Ludwigslust-Parchim I – Nordwestmecklenburg I	Dietrich Monstadt	Reem Alabali-Radovan	SPD	45,189	29.4	13,435	Dietrich Monstadt
13	Ludwigslust-Parchim II – Nordwestmecklenburg II – Landkreis Rostock I	Karin Strenz	Frank Junge	SPD	50,736	35.2	24,528	Simone Borchardt
14	Rostock – Landkreis Rostock II	Peter Stein	Katrin Zschau	SPD	43,932	27.0	14,217	Dietmar Bartsch
15	Vorpommern-Rügen – Vorpommern-Greifswald I	Angela Merkel	Anna Kassautzki	SPD	40,429	24.3	6,526	Georg Günther
16	Mecklenburgische Seenplatte I – Vorpommern-Greifswald II	Philipp Amthor	Erik von Malottki	SPD	37,392	24.8	796	Enrico Komning
17	Mecklenburgische Seenplatte II – Landkreis Rostock III	Eckhardt Rehberg	Johannes Arlt	SPD	43,730	31.1	13,410	Ulrike Schielke-Ziesing

List members
AfD	CDU	LINKE
1. Leif-Erik Holm (1); 2. Enrico Komning (2); 3. Ulrike Schielke-Ziesing (3)	1. Philipp Amthor (1); 2. Dietrich Monstadt (2); 3. Simone Borchardt (3)	1. Dietmar Bartsch (1); 2. Ina Latendorf (2)
FDP	GRÜNE	
1. Hagen Reinhold (1)	1. Claudia Müller (1)	

=== Hamburg ===
Party	Constituency			Party list			Total seats	+/–
Party	Votes	%	Seats	Votes	%	Seats	Total seats	+/–
Social Democratic Party (SPD)	334,831	33.4	4	298,342	29.7	1	5	0
Alliance 90/The Greens (GRÜNE)	237,328	23.7	2	250,532	24.9	2	4	+2
Christian Democratic Union (CDU)	179,572	17.9	0	155,220	15.4	3	3	−1
Free Democratic Party (FDP)	84,603	8.4	0	114,602	11.4	2	2	0
The Left (DIE LINKE)	72,507	7.2	0	67,578	6.7	1	1	−1
Alternative for Germany (AfD)	49,828	5.0	0	50,537	5.0	1	1	0
Grassroots Democratic Party	17,259	1.7	0	13,961	1.4	0	0	New
Human Environment Animal Protection Party	–	–	–	12,325	1.2	0	0	0
Die PARTEI	6,585	0.7	0	10,147	1.0	0	0	0
Team Todenhöfer	–	–	–	8,952	0.9	0	0	New
Free Voters	6,743	0.7	0	5,601	0.6	0	0	0
Volt Germany	4,476	0.4	0	5,429	0.5	0	0	New
Pirate Party Germany	3,419	0.3	0	4,377	0.4	0	0	0
Ecological Democratic Party	3,666	0.4	0	2,016	0.2	0	0	0
The Urbans. A HipHop Party	–	–	–	1,341	0.1	0	0	0
V-Partei³	–	–	–	1,219	0.1	0	0	0
The Humanists	–	–	–	1,203	0.1	0	0	0
National Democratic Party	643	0.1	0	648	0.1	0	0	0
German Communist Party	–	–	–	532	0.1	0	0	0
The Pinks/Alliance 21	–	–	–	386	0.0	0	0	New
Marxist–Leninist Party	962	0.1	0	348	0.0	0	0	0
Liberal Conservative Reformers	179	0.0	0	248	0.0	0	0	New
Independents & voter groups	723	0.1	0	–	–	–	0	–
Invalid/blank votes	7,720	–	–	5,500	–	–	–	–
Total	1,011,044	100	6	1,011,044	100	10	16	0
Registered voters/turnout	1,298,792	77.8	–	1,298,792	77.8	–	–	–
Source: Federal Returning Officer

Constituency members
#	Constituency	Previous member	Elected member	Party	Votes	%	Margin	Runner-up
18	Hamburg-Mitte	Johannes Kahrs	Falko Droßmann	SPD	59,229	33.2	12,903	Manuel Muja
19	Hamburg-Altona	Matthias Bartke	Linda Heitmann	GRÜNE	45,063	29.7	1,636	Matthias Bartke
20	Hamburg-Eimsbüttel	Niels Annen	Till Steffen	GRÜNE	47,734	29.8	359	Niels Annen
21	Hamburg-Nord	Christoph Ploß	Dorothee Martin	SPD	56,594	30.7	9,219	Katharina Beck
22	Hamburg-Wandsbek	Aydan Özoğuz	Aydan Özoğuz	SPD	66,616	38.7	33,531	Franziska Hoppermann
23	Hamburg-Bergedorf – Harburg	Metin Hakverdi	Metin Hakverdi	SPD	61,590	39.3	35,107	Uwe Schneider

List members
CDU	GRÜNE	FDP
1. Christoph Ploß (1); 2. Franziska Hoppermann (2); 3. Christoph de Vries (3)	1. Katharina Beck (1); 2. Emilia Fester (3)	1. Michael Kruse (1); 2. Ria Schröder (2)
LINKE	AfD	SPD
1. Żaklin Nastić (1)	1. Bernd Baumann (1)	1. Niels Annen (2)

=== Lower Saxony ===
Party	Constituency			Party list			Total seats	+/–
Party	Votes	%	Seats	Votes	%	Seats	Total seats	+/–
Social Democratic Party (SPD)	1,603,785	35.5	22	1,498,500	33.1	4	25	+6
Christian Democratic Union (CDU)	1,323,070	29.3	8	1,093,579	24.2	10	18	−3
Alliance 90/The Greens (GRÜNE)	646,848	14.3	0	726,613	16.1	13	13	+7
Free Democratic Party (FDP)	347,802	7.7	0	474,638	10.5	8	8	+1
Alternative for Germany (AfD)	292,032	6.5	0	336,434	7.4	6	6	−1
The Left (DIE LINKE)	142,785	3.2	0	148,657	3.3	3	3	−2
Human Environment Animal Protection Party	25,460	0.6	0	57,931	1.3	0	0	0
Grassroots Democratic Party	52,585	1.2	0	46,369	1.0	0	0	New
Die PARTEI	16,581	0.4	0	40,158	0.9	0	0	0
Free Voters	47,466	1.1	0	37,214	0.8	0	0	0
Pirate Party Germany	9,837	0.2	0	16,955	0.4	0	0	0
Team Todenhöfer	–	–	–	13,565	0.3	0	0	New
Volt Germany	–	–	–	11,897	0.3	0	0	New
National Democratic Party	–	–	–	4,379	0.1	0	0	0
The Humanists	287	0.0	0	3,806	0.1	0	0	0
Ecological Democratic Party	1,711	0.0	0	3,484	0.1	0	0	0
V-Partei³	630	0.0	0	3,283	0.1	0	0	0
The Urbans. A HipHop Party	–	–	–	2,625	0.1	0	0	0
Liberal Conservative Reformers	1,807	0.0	0	1,306	0.0	0	0	New
German Communist Party	523	0.0	0	1,020	0.0	0	0	0
Marxist–Leninist Party	750	0.0	0	808	0.0	0	0	0
Independents & voter groups	4,613	0.1	0	–	–	–	0	–
Invalid/blank votes	44,570	–	–	39,921	–	–	–	–
Total	4,563,142	100	30	4,563,142	100	44	74	+8
Registered voters/turnout	6,105,381	74.7	–	6,105,381	74.7	–	–	–
Source: Federal Returning Officer

Constituency members
#	Constituency	Previous member	Elected member	Party	Votes	%	Margin	Runner-up
24	Aurich – Emden	Johann Saathoff	Johann Saathoff	SPD	71,596	52.8	47,577	Joachim Kleen
25	Unterems	Gitta Connemann	Gitta Connemann	CDU	77,143	44.4	27,703	Anja Troff-Schaffarzyk
26	Friesland – Wilhelmshaven – Wittmund	Siemtje Möller	Siemtje Möller	SPD	60,392	45.4	31,106	Anne Janssen
27	Oldenburg – Ammerland	Dennis Rohde	Dennis Rohde	SPD	65,757	38.2	30,638	Susanne Menge
28	Delmenhorst – Wesermarsch – Oldenburg-Land	Astrid Grotelüschen	Susanne Mittag	SPD	59,377	36.7	18,967	Philipp Albrecht
29	Cuxhaven – Stade II	Enak Ferlemann	Daniel Schneider	SPD	51,417	36.8	9,332	Enak Ferlemann
30	Stade I – Rotenburg II	Oliver Grundmann	Oliver Grundmann	CDU	52,069	34.6	4,306	Kai Köser
31	Mittelems	Albert Stegemann	Albert Stegemann	CDU	72,523	40.5	20,214	Daniela De Ridder
32	Cloppenburg – Vechta	Silvia Breher	Silvia Breher	CDU	80,134	49.1	46,309	Alexander Bartz
33	Diepholz – Nienburg I	Axel Knoerig	Axel Knoerig	CDU	49,116	33.8	2,661	Peggy Schierenbeck
34	Osterholz – Verden	Andreas Mattfeldt	Andreas Mattfeldt	CDU	50,274	33.7	1,700	Michael Harjes
35	Rotenburg I – Heidekreis	Lars Klingbeil	Lars Klingbeil	SPD	59,131	47.6	26,411	Carsten Büttinghaus
36	Harburg	Michael Grosse-Brömer	Svenja Stadler	SPD	49,773	31.0	3,062	Michael Grosse-Brömer
37	Lüchow-Dannenberg – Lüneburg	Eckhard Pols	Jakob Blankenburg	SPD	38,784	28.2	4,178	Julia Verlinden
38	Osnabrück-Land	André Berghegger	André Berghegger	CDU	54,535	36.2	9,826	Anke Hennig
39	Stadt Osnabrück	Mathias Middelberg	Manuel Gava	SPD	44,876	30.3	1,560	Mathias Middelberg
40	Nienburg II – Schaumburg	Maik Beermann	Marja-Liisa Völlers	SPD	50,017	35.3	6,200	Maik Beermann
41	Stadt Hannover I	Kerstin Tack	Adis Ahmetovic	SPD	44,538	34.9	16,687	Swantje Michaelsen
42	Stadt Hannover II	Yasmin Fahimi	Yasmin Fahimi	SPD	46,929	32.9	9,150	Sven-Christian Kindler
43	Hannover-Land I	Hendrik Hoppenstedt	Rebecca Schamber	SPD	58,297	33.7	3,112	Hendrik Hoppenstedt
44	Celle – Uelzen	Henning Otte	Henning Otte	CDU	51,504	32.9	869	Dirk-Ulrich Mende
45	Gifhorn – Peine	Hubertus Heil	Hubertus Heil	SPD	72,113	43.7	31,834	Ingrid Pahlmann
46	Hameln-Pyrmont – Holzminden	Johannes Schraps	Johannes Schraps	SPD	56,893	43.2	23,318	Mareike Wulf
47	Hannover-Land II	Matthias Miersch	Matthias Miersch	SPD	73,088	40.7	27,367	Tilman Kuban
48	Hildesheim	Bernd Westphal	Bernd Westphal	SPD	61,857	38.7	20,627	Ute Bertram
49	Salzgitter – Wolfenbüttel	Sigmar Gabriel	Dunja Kreiser	SPD	56,157	38.6	16,616	Holger Bormann
50	Braunschweig	Carola Reimann	Christos Pantazis	SPD	51,220	36.7	19,944	Carsten Müller
51	Helmstedt – Wolfsburg	Falko Mohrs	Falko Mohrs	SPD	54,349	42.1	19,982	Andreas Weber
52	Goslar – Northeim – Osterode	Roy Kühne	Frauke Heiligenstadt	SPD	52,129	36.7	4,933	Roy Kühne
53	Göttingen	Thomas Oppermann	Andreas Philippi	SPD	51,385	32.2	8,427	Fritz Güntzler

List members
GRÜNE	CDU	FDP
1. Filiz Polat (1); 2. Sven-Christian Kindler (2); 3. Christina-Johanne Schröder (3); 4. Jürgen Trittin (4); 5. Julia Verlinden (5); 6. Frank Bsirske (6); 7. Katja Keul (7); 8. Helge Limburg (8); 9. Karoline Otte (9); 10. Stefan Wenzel (10); 11. Swantje Michaelsen (11); 12. Julian Pahlke (12); 13. Susanne Menge (13)	1. Hendrik Hoppenstedt (1); 2. Michael Grosse-Brömer (2); 3. Mathias Middelberg (4); 4. Enak Ferlemann (5); 5. Anne Janssen (6); 6. Tilman Kuban (7); 7. Carsten Müller (8); 8. Mareike Wulf (9); 9. Fritz Güntzler (10); 10. Stephan Albani (11)	1. Christian Dürr (1); 2. Jens Beeck (2); 3. Anja Schulz (3); 4. Konstantin Kuhle (4); 5. Knut Gerschau (5); 6. Gero Clemens Hocker (6); 7. Matthias Seestern-Pauly (7); 8. Anikó Merten (8)
AfD	SPD	LINKE
1. Joachim Wundrak (1); 2. Frank Rinck (2); 3. Thomas Ehrhorn (3); 4. Dietmar Friedhoff (4); 5. Jörn König (5); 6. Dirk Brandes (6)	1. Anja Troff-Schaffarzyk (14); 2. Anke Hennig (18); 3. Peggy Schierenbeck (20); 4. Daniela Friederike De Ridder (24) (Note: Elected following the 2024 Berlin repeat election)	1. Amira Mohamed Ali (1); 2. Victor Perli (2); 3. Heidi Reichinnek (3)

=== Bremen ===
Party	Constituency			Party list			Total seats	+/–
Party	Votes	%	Seats	Votes	%	Seats	Total seats	+/–
Social Democratic Party (SPD)	108,432	33.2	2	103,224	31.5	0	2	0
Alliance 90/The Greens (GRÜNE)	60,490	18.5	0	68,427	20.9	1	1	0
Christian Democratic Union (CDU)	67,992	20.8	0	56,499	17.2	1	1	0
Free Democratic Party (FDP)	22,398	6.8	0	30,481	9.3	1	1	+1
The Left (DIE LINKE)	25,923	7.9	0	25,352	7.7	0	0	−1
Alternative for Germany (AfD)	21,565	6.6	0	22,575	6.9	0	0	−1
Human Environment Animal Protection Party	2,440	0.7	0	4,517	1.4	0	0	0
Die PARTEI	5,464	1.7	0	3,909	1.2	0	0	0
Grassroots Democratic Party	4,007	1.2	0	3,461	1.1	0	0	New
Team Todenhöfer	–	–	–	3,014	0.9	0	0	New
Free Voters	3,652	1.1	0	2,911	0.9	0	0	0
Volt Germany	1,182	0.4	0	1,322	0.4	0	0	New
The Humanists	1,016	0.3	0	589	0.2	0	0	0
V-Partei³	609	0.2	0	515	0.2	0	0	0
Ecological Democratic Party	713	0.2	0	407	0.1	0	0	0
Human World	–	–	–	386	0.1	0	0	0
National Democratic Party	–	–	–	291	0.1	0	0	0
Marxist–Leninist Party	266	0.1	0	160	0.0	0	0	0
Pirate Party Germany	908	0.3	0	–	–	–	0	0
Invalid/blank votes	3,374	–	–	2,391	–	–	–	–
Total	330,431	100	2	330,431	100	3	5	−1
Registered voters/turnout	459,749	71.9	–	459,749	71.9	–	–	–
Source: Federal Returning Officer

Constituency members
#	Constituency	Previous member	Elected member	Party	Votes	%	Margin	Runner-up
54	Bremen I	Sarah Ryglewski	Sarah Ryglewski	SPD	55,934	30.2	16,213	Kirsten Kappert-Gonther
55	Bremen II – Bremerhaven	Uwe Schmidt	Uwe Schmidt	SPD	52,498	36.9	23,946	Wiebke Winter

List members
GRÜNE	CDU	FDP
1. Kirsten Kappert-Gonther (1)	1. Thomas Röwekamp (1)	1. Volker Redder (1)

=== Brandenburg ===
Party	Constituency			Party list			Total seats	+/–
Party	Votes	%	Seats	Votes	%	Seats	Total seats	+/–
Social Democratic Party (SPD)	437,753	28.7	10	450,573	29.5	0	10	+6
Alternative for Germany (AfD)	279,978	18.3	0	277,412	18.1	5	5	0
Christian Democratic Union (CDU)	283,668	18.6	0	233,891	15.3	4	4	−5
Free Democratic Party (FDP)	121,094	7.9	0	142,426	9.3	2	2	0
Alliance 90/The Greens (GRÜNE)	120,005	7.9	0	137,472	9.0	2	2	+1
The Left (DIE LINKE)	142,628	9.3	0	129,762	8.5	2	2	−2
Free Voters	47,029	3.1	0	40,509	2.6	0	0	0
Human Environment Animal Protection Party	6,735	0.4	0	39,823	2.6	0	0	0
Grassroots Democratic Party	26,766	1.8	0	23,062	1.5	0	0	New
Die PARTEI	27,429	1.8	0	19,199	1.3	0	0	0
Independents for Citizen-oriented Democracy	7,339	0.5	0	9,113	0.6	0	0	New
Pirate Party Germany	5,848	0.4	0	6,340	0.4	0	0	0
National Democratic Party	–	–	–	4,868	0.3	0	0	0
Volt Germany	1,004	0.1	0	4,293	0.3	0	0	New
Team Todenhöfer	–	–	–	3,353	0.2	0	0	New
Ecological Democratic Party	4,499	0.3	0	2,835	0.2	0	0	0
German Communist Party	1,785	0.1	0	1,978	0.1	0	0	0
The Humanists	458	0.0	0	1,892	0.1	0	0	0
Marxist–Leninist Party	304	0.0	0	842	0.1	0	0	0
Family Party of Germany	1,817	0.1	0	–	–	–	0	0
Independents & voter groups	11,619	0.8	0	–	–	–	0	–
Invalid/blank votes	21,706	–	–	19,821	–	–	–	–
Total	1,549,464	100	10	1,549,464	100	15	25	0
Registered voters/turnout	2,048,844	75.6	–	2,048,844	75.6	–	–	–
Source: Federal Returning Officer

Constituency members
#	Constituency	Previous member	Elected member	Party	Votes	%	Margin	Runner-up
56	Prignitz – Ostprignitz-Ruppin – Havelland I	Sebastian Steineke	Wiebke Papenbrock	SPD	39,853	33.0	16,054	Dominik Kaufner
57	Uckermark – Barnim I	Jens Koeppen	Stefan Zierke	SPD	38,247	29.6	12,084	Hannes Gnauck
58	Oberhavel – Havelland II	Uwe Feiler	Ariane Fäscher	SPD	50,697	26.3	10,701	Uwe Feiler
59	Märkisch-Oderland – Barnim II	Hans-Georg von der Marwitz	Simona Koß	SPD	43,117	24.8	2,313	Sabine Buder
60	Brandenburg an der Havel – Potsdam-Mittelmark I – Havelland III – Teltow-Fläming I	Dietlind Tiemann	Sonja Eichwede	SPD	46,642	32.1	17,406	Dietlind Tiemann
61	Potsdam – Potsdam-Mittelmark II – Teltow-Fläming II	Manja Schüle	Olaf Scholz	SPD	64,271	34.0	28,819	Annalena Baerbock
62	Dahme-Spreewald – Teltow-Fläming III – Oberspreewald-Lausitz I	Jana Schimke	Sylvia Lehmann	SPD	50,696	26.5	12,616	Jana Schimke
63	Frankfurt (Oder) – Oder-Spree	Martin Patzelt	Mathias Papendieck	SPD	39,350	28.0	9,168	Wilko Möller
64	Cottbus – Spree-Neiße	Klaus-Peter Schulze	Maja Wallstein	SPD	34,882	27.6	2,352	Daniel Münschke
65	Elbe-Elster – Oberspreewald-Lausitz II	Michael Stübgen	Hannes Walter	SPD	29,998	25.4	438	Silvio Wolf

List members
AfD	CDU	FDP
1. Alexander Gauland (1); 2. René Springer (2); 3. Steffen Kotré (3); 4. Norbert Kleinwächter (4); 5. Hannes Gnauck (5)	1. Jens Koeppen (1); 2. Uwe Feiler (2); 3. Jana Schimke (3); 4. Knut Abraham (4)	1. Linda Teuteberg (1); 2. Friedhelm Boginski (2)
GRÜNE	LINKE	
1. Annalena Baerbock (1); 2. Michael Kellner (2)	1. Christian Görke (1); 2. Anke Domscheit-Berg (2)	

=== Saxony-Anhalt ===
Party	Constituency			Party list			Total seats	+/–
Party	Votes	%	Seats	Votes	%	Seats	Total seats	+/–
Social Democratic Party (SPD)	293,197	24.4	4	305,085	25.4	1	5	+2
Christian Democratic Union (CDU)	299,363	24.9	3	252,286	21.0	1	4	−5
Alternative for Germany (AfD)	242,065	20.2	2	235,492	19.6	2	4	0
The Left (DIE LINKE)	127,576	10.6	0	115,330	9.6	2	2	−2
Free Democratic Party (FDP)	96,084	8.0	0	114,024	9.5	2	2	0
Alliance 90/The Greens (GRÜNE)	64,326	5.4	0	78,701	6.5	1	1	0
Free Voters	32,152	2.7	0	22,509	1.9	0	0	0
Grassroots Democratic Party	22,554	1.9	0	19,213	1.6	0	0	New
Human Environment Animal Protection Party	1,969	0.2	0	14,483	1.2	0	0	0
Animal Protection Alliance	7,371	0.6	0	13,672	1.1	0	0	0
Die PARTEI	4,416	0.4	0	9,763	0.8	0	0	0
Garden Party	2,095	0.2	0	7,611	0.6	0	0	0
Pirate Party Germany	–	–	–	4,067	0.3	0	0	0
National Democratic Party	–	–	–	3,002	0.2	0	0	0
Volt Germany	–	–	–	2,097	0.2	0	0	New
The Humanists	–	–	–	1,415	0.1	0	0	0
The Urbans. A HipHop Party	–	–	–	1,302	0.1	0	0	0
Marxist–Leninist Party	620	0.1	0	1,042	0.1	0	0	0
Ecological Democratic Party	302	0.0	0	846	0.1	0	0	0
Independents & voter groups	6,088	0.5	0	–	–	–	0	–
Invalid/blank votes	14,583	–	–	12,821	–	–	–	–
Total	1,214,761	100	9	1,214,761	100	9	18	−5
Registered voters/turnout	1,789,775	67.9	–	1,789,775	67.9	–	–	–
Source: Federal Returning Officer

Constituency members
#	Constituency	Previous member	Elected member	Party	Votes	%	Margin	Runner-up
66	Altmark	Eckhard Gnodtke	Herbert Wollmann	SPD	29,599	27.5	6,166	Uwe Harms
67	Börde – Jerichower Land	Manfred Behrens	Franziska Kersten	SPD	38,520	26.2	1,868	Gerry Weber
68	Harz	Heike Brehmer	Heike Brehmer	CDU	37,884	27.7	3,072	Maik Berger
69	Magdeburg	Tino Sorge	Martin Kröber	SPD	39,233	25.3	5,056	Tino Sorge
70	Dessau – Wittenberg	Sepp Müller	Sepp Müller	CDU	39,042	34.3	16,864	Leonard Schneider
71	Anhalt	Kees de Vries	Kay-Uwe Ziegler	AfD	33,225	24.2	930	Frank Wyszkowski
72	Halle	Christoph Bernstiel	Karamba Diaby	SPD	42,335	28.8	11,836	Christoph Bernstiel
73	Burgenland – Saalekreis	Dieter Stier	Dieter Stier	CDU	32,649	26.3	321	Martin Reichardt
74	Mansfeld	Torsten Schweiger	Robert Farle	AfD	32,930	25.1	198	Torsten Schweiger

List members
AfD	LINKE	FDP
1. Martin Reichardt (1); 2. Jan Schmidt (2)	1. Jan Korte (1); 2. Petra Sitte (2)	1. Marcus Faber (1); 2. Ingo Bodtke (2)
SPD	CDU	GRÜNE
1. Katrin Budde (2)	1. Tino Sorge (3)	1. Steffi Lemke (1)

=== Berlin ===
Note: The results shown here reflect the outcome following the 2024 Berlin federal repeat election.

Party	Constituency			Party list			Total seats	+/–
Party	Votes	%	Seats	Votes	%	Seats	Total seats	+/–
Social Democratic Party (SPD)	366,567	21.8	4	374,411	22.2	2	6	+1
Alliance 90/The Greens (GRÜNE)	346,860	20.6	3	370,728	22.0	3	6	+2
Christian Democratic Union (CDU)	339,237	20.2	3	289,139	17.2	2	5	−1
The Left (DIE LINKE)	238,776	14.2	2	194,006	11.5	1	3	−3
Alternative for Germany (AfD)	151,440	9.0	0	159,020	9.4	3	3	−1
Free Democratic Party (FDP)	106,289	6.3	0	136,995	8.1	2	2	−1
Human Environment Animal Protection Party	47,129	2.8	0	43,598	2.6	0	0	0
Die PARTEI	35,574	2.1	0	27,197	1.6	0	0	0
Team Todenhöfer	2,326	0.1	0	17,493	1.0	0	0	New
The Greys	1,958	0.1	0	17,304	1.0	0	0	0
Free Voters	12,131	0.7	0	14,952	0.9	0	0	0
Volt Germany	2,044	0.2	0	10,443	0.6	0	0	0
Pirate Party Germany	4,533	0.3	0	6,584	0.4	0	0	0
Party for Health Research	807	0.0	0	4,296	0.3	0	0	0
The Humanists	1,097	0.1	0	3,237	0.2	0	0	0
Ecological Democratic Party	2,963	0.2	0	2,615	0.2	0	0	0
The Urbans. A HipHop Party	370	0.0	0	2,511	0.1	0	0	0
German Communist Party	–	–	–	2,181	0.1	0	0	0
National Democratic Party	–	–	–	1,766	0.1	0	0	0
Liberal Conservative Reformers	1,488	0.1	0	1,400	0.1	0	0	New
V-Partei³	–	–	–	1,177	0.1	0	0	0
Marxist–Leninist Party	1,121	0.1	0	749	0.0	0	0	0
Civil Rights Movement Solidarity	–	–	–	665	0.0	0	0	0
Socialist Equality Party	–	–	–	429	0.0	0	0	0
Grassroots Democratic Party	16,770	1.0	0	–	–	–	0	New
Human World	300	0.0	0	–	–	–	0	0
The Others (sonstige)	251	0.0	0	–	–	–	0	New
The Pinks/Alliance 21	201	0.0	0	–	–	–	0	New
Bergpartei, die "ÜberPartei"	191	0.0	0	–	–	–	0	0
Independents & voter groups	1,414	0.1	0	–	–	–	0	–
Invalid/blank votes	27,632	–	–	26,813	–	–	–	–
Total	1,682,077	100	12	1,682,896	100	13	25	−3
Registered voters/turnout	2,460,618	69.5	–	2,460,618	69.5	–	–	–
Source: Federal Returning Officer

Constituency members
#	Constituency	Previous member	Elected member	Party	Votes	%	Margin	Runner-up
75	Berlin-Mitte	Eva Högl	Hanna Steinmüller	GRÜNE	42,443	30.6	11,832	Annika Klose
76	Berlin-Pankow	Stefan Liebich	Stefan Gelbhaar	GRÜNE	46,401	26.8	12,468	Manuela Anders-Granitzki
77	Berlin-Reinickendorf	Frank Steffel	Monika Grütters	CDU	32,972	29.5	6,072	Torsten Einstmann
78	Berlin-Spandau – Charlottenburg North	Swen Schulz	Helmut Kleebank	SPD	39,062	32.8	10,415	Joe Chialo
79	Berlin-Steglitz-Zehlendorf	Thomas Heilmann	Thomas Heilmann	CDU	48,530	28.6	7,159	Ruppert Stüwe
80	Berlin-Charlottenburg-Wilmersdorf	Klaus-Dieter Gröhler	Michael Müller	SPD	33,723	25.6	604	Lisa Paus
81	Berlin-Tempelhof-Schöneberg	Jan-Marco Luczak	Kevin Kühnert	SPD	45,218	26.7	2,539	Renate Künast
82	Berlin-Neukölln	Fritz Felgentreu	Hakan Demir	SPD	33,880	25.8	8,090	Andreas Audretsch
83	Berlin-Friedrichshain-Kreuzberg – Prenzlauer Berg East	Canan Bayram	Canan Bayram	GRÜNE	56,593	37.8	29,570	Pascal Meiser
84	Berlin-Treptow-Köpenick	Gregor Gysi	Gregor Gysi	LINKE	54,548	35.4	30,864	Ana-Maria Trăsnea
85	Berlin-Marzahn-Hellersdorf	Petra Pau	Mario Czaja	CDU	38,914	29.7	10,342	Petra Pau
86	Berlin-Lichtenberg	Gesine Lötzsch	Gesine Lötzsch	LINKE	36,408	25.8	8,995	Anja Ingenbleek

List members
GRÜNE	SPD	FDP
1. Lisa Paus (1); 2. Renate Künast (3); 3. Andreas Audretsch (4); 4. ~~Nina Stahr (5) (Note: Candidate was originally elected, but lost the seat as a result of the 2024 Berlin repeat election)~~	1. Cansel Kiziltepe (2); 2. Annika Klose (4); 3. ~~Ruppert Stüwe (5)~~	1. Christoph Meyer (1); 2. Daniela Kluckert (2); 3. ~~Lars Lindemann (3)~~
AfD	CDU	LINKE
1. Beatrix von Storch (1); 2. Gottfried Curio (2); 3. Götz Frömming (3)	1. Jan-Marco Luczak (2); 2. Ottilie Klein (3)	1. Petra Pau (1); 2. ~~Pascal Meiser (2)~~

=== North Rhine-Westphalia ===
Party	Constituency			Party list			Total seats	+/–
Party	Votes	%	Seats	Votes	%	Seats	Total seats	+/–
Social Democratic Party (SPD)	3,068,628	31.1	30	2,880,226	29.1	19	49	+8
Christian Democratic Union (CDU)	2,973,458	30.1	30	2,566,719	26.0	12	42	0
Alliance 90/The Greens (GRÜNE)	1,500,696	15.2	4	1,587,067	16.1	24	28	+16
Free Democratic Party (FDP)	851,337	8.6	0	1,130,154	11.4	19	19	−1
Alternative for Germany (AfD)	705,020	7.1	0	717,510	7.3	12	12	−3
The Left (DIE LINKE)	317,869	3.2	0	366,947	3.7	6	6	−6
Human Environment Animal Protection Party	11,068	0.1	0	136,195	1.4	0	0	0
Die PARTEI	170,191	1.7	0	108,504	1.1	0	0	0
Grassroots Democratic Party	111,606	1.1	0	99,217	1.0	0	0	New
Team Todenhöfer	–	–	–	65,137	0.7	0	0	New
Free Voters	97,782	1.0	0	64,990	0.7	0	0	0
Pirate Party Germany	6,629	0.1	0	36,789	0.4	0	0	0
Volt Germany	24,138	0.2	0	36,039	0.4	0	0	New
European Party Love	873	0.0	0	12,967	0.1	0	0	New
Party for Health Research	–	–	–	11,673	0.1	0	0	0
Alliance C – Christians for Germany	1,405	0.0	0	10,128	0.1	0	0	0
Lobbyists for Children (LfK)	–	–	–	9,189	0.1	0	0	New
National Democratic Party	–	–	–	8,956	0.1	0	0	0
Ecological Democratic Party	1,394	0.0	0	8,052	0.1	0	0	0
The Humanists	488	0.0	0	7,685	0.1	0	0	0
V-Partei³	454	0.0	0	6,628	0.1	0	0	0
The Urbans. A HipHop Party	–	–	–	4,729	0.0	0	0	0
Marxist–Leninist Party	5,894	0.1	0	3,476	0.0	0	0	0
Party of Progress	–	–	–	3,228	0.0	0	0	New
German Communist Party	2,285	0.0	0	2,556	0.0	0	0	0
Liberal Conservative Reformers	1,064	0.0	0	2,298	0.0	0	0	New
Socialist Equality Party	–	–	–	971	0.0	0	0	0
Democracy by Referendum	1,086	0.0	0	–	–	–	0	New
Independents for Citizen-oriented Democracy	1,020	0.0	0	–	–	–	0	New
Independents & voter groups	14,134	0.1	0	–	–	–	0	–
Invalid/blank votes	92,465	–	–	72,954	–	–	–	–
Total	9,960,984	100	64	9,960,984	100	92	156	+14
Registered voters/turnout	13,040,267	76.4	–	13,040,267	76.4	–	–	–
Source: Federal Returning Officer

Constituency members
#	Constituency	Previous member	Elected member	Party	Votes	%	Margin	Runner-up
87	Aachen I	Rudolf Henke	Oliver Krischer	GRÜNE	41,942	30.2	6,380	Rudolf Henke
88	Aachen II	Claudia Moll	Claudia Moll	SPD	58,189	34.5	3,381	Catarina dos Santos Firnhaber
89	Heinsberg	Wilfried Oellers	Wilfried Oellers	CDU	57,095	39.7	19,846	Norbert Spinrath
90	Düren	Thomas Rachel	Thomas Rachel	CDU	55,719	36.7	8,985	Dietmar Nietan
91	Rhein-Erft-Kreis I	Georg Kippels	Georg Kippels	CDU	63,635	33.0	4,777	Aaron Spielmanns
92	Euskirchen – Rhein-Erft-Kreis II	Detlef Seif	Detlef Seif	CDU	65,981	34.6	15,089	Dagmar Andres
93	Cologne I	Karsten Möring	Sanae Abdi	SPD	38,985	27.9	5,580	Lisa-Marie Friede
94	Cologne II	Heribert Hirte	Sven Lehmann	GRÜNE	70,658	34.6	19,740	Sandra von Möller
95	Cologne III	Rolf Mützenich	Rolf Mützenich	SPD	46,149	29.9	2,549	Katharina Dröge
96	Bonn	Ulrich Kelber	Katrin Uhlig	GRÜNE	46,467	25.2	216	Jessica Rosenthal
97	Rhein-Sieg-Kreis I	Elisabeth Winkelmeier-Becker	Elisabeth Winkelmeier-Becker	CDU	60,776	32.6	7,563	Sebastian Hartmann
98	Rhein-Sieg-Kreis II	Norbert Röttgen	Norbert Röttgen	CDU	70,144	40.0	29,140	Katja Stoppenbrink
99	Oberbergischer Kreis	Carsten Brodesser	Carsten Brodesser	CDU	53,757	33.9	11,296	Michaela Engelmeier
100	Rheinisch-Bergischer Kreis	Hermann-Josef Tebroke	Hermann-Josef Tebroke	CDU	52,714	30.0	12,887	Kastriot Krasniqi
101	Leverkusen – Cologne IV	Karl Lauterbach	Karl Lauterbach	SPD	69,662	45.6	38,465	Serap Güler
102	Wuppertal I	Helge Lindh	Helge Lindh	SPD	54,065	37.3	22,105	Caroline Lünenschloss
103	Solingen – Remscheid – Wuppertal II	Jürgen Hardt	Ingo Schäfer	SPD	52,852	32.6	8,074	Jürgen Hardt
104	Mettmann I	Michaela Noll	Klaus Wiener	CDU	47,326	30.0	8,000	Christian Steinacker
105	Mettmann II	Peter Beyer	Peter Beyer	CDU	38,429	31.3	794	Kerstin Griese
106	Düsseldorf I	Thomas Jarzombek	Thomas Jarzombek	CDU	54,158	31.1	15,203	Zanda Martens
107	Düsseldorf II	Sylvia Pantel	Andreas Rimkus	SPD	41,169	29.2	6,368	Sylvia Pantel
108	Neuss I	Hermann Gröhe	Hermann Gröhe	CDU	57,445	35.8	6,054	Daniel Rinkert
109	Mönchengladbach	Günter Krings	Günter Krings	CDU	45,550	35.6	8,002	Gülistan Yüksel
110	Krefeld I – Neuss II	Ansgar Heveling	Ansgar Heveling	CDU	51,500	33.4	12,247	Philipp Einfalt
111	Viersen	Uwe Schummer	Martin Plum	CDU	62,123	35.8	14,317	Udo Schiefner
112	Kleve	Stefan Rouenhoff	Stefan Rouenhoff	CDU	63,701	37.6	15,559	Bodo Wißen
113	Wesel I	Sabine Weiss	Rainer Keller	SPD	54,488	34.2	7,040	Sabine Weiss
114	Krefeld II – Wesel II	Kerstin Radomski	Jan Dieren	SPD	45,852	35.2	8,819	Kerstin Radomski
115	Duisburg I	Bärbel Bas	Bärbel Bas	SPD	47,314	40.3	23,015	Thomas Mahlberg
116	Duisburg II	Mahmut Özdemir	Mahmut Özdemir	SPD	38,162	39.4	18,758	Volker Mosblech
117	Oberhausen – Wesel III	Dirk Vöpel	Dirk Vöpel	SPD	55,790	38.8	23,513	Marie-Luise Dött
118	Mülheim – Essen I	Arno Klare	Sebastian Fiedler	SPD	50,168	36.3	17,078	Astrid Timmermann-Fechter
119	Essen II	Dirk Heidenblut	Dirk Heidenblut	SPD	39,410	37.8	15,675	Florian Fuchs
120	Essen III	Matthias Hauer	Matthias Hauer	CDU	46,635	30.7	1,023	Gereon Wolters
121	Recklinghausen I	Frank Schwabe	Frank Schwabe	SPD	49,437	41.0	18,592	Michael Breilmann
122	Recklinghausen II	Michael Groß	Brian Nickholz	SPD	51,050	37.4	12,725	Lars Ehm
123	Gelsenkirchen	Markus Töns	Markus Töns	SPD	44,965	40.5	23,011	Laura Rosen
124	Steinfurt I – Borken I	Jens Spahn	Jens Spahn	CDU	62,322	40.0	18,275	Sarah Lahrkamp
125	Bottrop – Recklinghausen III	Michael Gerdes	Michael Gerdes	SPD	57,560	39.1	17,726	Sven Volmering
126	Borken II	Johannes Röring	Anne König	CDU	70,334	43.7	29,483	Nadine Heselhaus
127	Coesfeld – Steinfurt II	Marc Henrichmann	Marc Henrichmann	CDU	65,402	40.9	25,257	Johannes Waldmann
128	Steinfurt III	Anja Karliczek	Anja Karliczek	CDU	52,445	34.0	4,377	Jürgen Coße
129	Münster	Sybille Benning	Maria Klein-Schmeink	GRÜNE	63,160	32.3	12,064	Stefan Nacke
130	Warendorf	Reinhold Sendker	Henning Rehbaum	CDU	59,631	36.3	8,946	Bernhard Daldrup
131	Gütersloh I	Ralph Brinkhaus	Ralph Brinkhaus	CDU	71,185	40.0	25,307	Elvan Korkmaz
132	Bielefeld – Gütersloh II	Wiebke Esdar	Wiebke Esdar	SPD	55,234	30.0	14,306	Angelika Westerwelle
133	Herford – Minden-Lübbecke II	Stefan Schwartze	Stefan Schwartze	SPD	61,554	36.5	16,416	Joachim Ebmeyer
134	Minden-Lübbecke I	Achim Post	Achim Post	SPD	58,168	38.4	18,489	Oliver Vogt
135	Lippe I	Kerstin Vieregge	Jürgen Berghahn	SPD	52,359	30.7	7,709	Kerstin Vieregge
136	Höxter – Lippe II	Christian Haase	Christian Haase	CDU	53,294	40.1	16,084	Ulrich Kros
137	Paderborn	Carsten Linnemann	Carsten Linnemann	CDU	84,669	47.9	51,156	Burkhard Blienert
138	Hagen – Ennepe-Ruhr-Kreis I	René Röspel	Timo Schisanowski	SPD	47,581	33.3	9,863	Christian Nienhaus
139	Ennepe-Ruhr-Kreis II	Ralf Kapschack	Axel Echeverria	SPD	47,993	35.4	14,636	Hartmut Ziebs
140	Bochum I	Axel Schäfer	Axel Schäfer	SPD	58,235	38.3	25,273	Fabian Schütz
141	Herne – Bochum II	Michelle Müntefering	Michelle Müntefering	SPD	52,792	43.4	28,765	Christoph Bußmann
142	Dortmund I	Marco Bülow (Note: Bülow was elected for the SPD, but left the party in November 2018. He joined Die PARTEI in November 2020.)	Jens Peick	SPD	51,037	33.0	20,986	Klaus Wegener
143	Dortmund II	Sabine Poschmann	Sabine Poschmann	SPD	55,695	39.1	26,798	Michael Depenbrock
144	Unna I	Oliver Kaczmarek	Oliver Kaczmarek	SPD	59,869	40.8	23,059	Hubert Hüppe
145	Hamm – Unna II	Michael Thews	Michael Thews	SPD	67,774	40.6	23,508	Arnd Hilwig
146	Soest	Hans-Jürgen Thies	Hans-Jürgen Thies	CDU	58,791	33.1	4,177	Wolfgang Hellmich
147	Hochsauerlandkreis	Patrick Sensburg	Friedrich Merz	CDU	62,810	40.4	12,754	Dirk Wiese
148	Siegen-Wittgenstein	Volkmar Klein	Volkmar Klein	CDU	54,042	33.6	5,145	Luiza Licina-Bode
149	Olpe – Märkischer Kreis I	Matthias Heider	Florian Müller	CDU	56,879	37.1	11,513	Nezahat Baradari
150	Märkischer Kreis II	Dagmar Freitag	Paul Ziemiak	CDU	47,937	33.6	4,591	Bettina Lugk

List members
GRÜNE	SPD	FDP
1. Britta Haßelmann (1); 2. Irene Mihalic (3); 3. Katharina Dröge (5); 4. Felix Banaszak (6); 5. Jan-Niclas Gesenhues (8); 6. Ulle Schauws (9); 7. Robin Wagener (10); 8. Nyke Slawik (11); 9. Lamya Kaddor (12); 10. Ophelia Nick (13); 11. Max Lucks (14); 12. Kai Gehring (16); 13. Sara Nanni (17); 14. Maik Außendorf (18); 15. Schahina Gambir (19); 16. Kathrin Henneberger (20); 17. Anne-Monika Spallek (21); 18. Markus Kurth (22); 19. Laura Kraft (23); 20. Janosch Dahmen (24); 21. Sabine Grützmacher (25); 22. Lukas Benner (26); 23. Anja Liebert (27); 24. Michael Sacher (28)	1. Svenja Schulze (2); 2. Sebastian Hartmann (3); 3. Kerstin Griese (4); 4. Dirk Wiese (5); 5. Udo Schiefner (7); 6. Bernhard Daldrup (9); 7. Nadine Heselhaus (10); 8. Bettina Lugk (14); 9. Dietmar Nietan (17); 10. Dagmar Andres (18); 11. Jessica Rosenthal (19); 12. Wolfgang Hellmich (20); 13. Gülistan Yüksel (21); 14. Sarah Lahrkamp (24); 15. Nezahat Baradari (26); 16. Zanda Martens (28); 17. Jürgen Coße (29); 18. Ye-One Rhie (30); 19. Luiza Licina-Bode (32)	1. Christian Lindner (1); 2. Marie-Agnes Strack-Zimmermann (2); 3. Alexander Graf Lambsdorff (3); 4. Marco Buschmann (4); 5. Johannes Vogel (5); 6. Bijan Djir-Sarai (6); 7. Otto Fricke (7); 8. Reinhard Houben (8); 9. Frank Schäffler (9); 10. Nicole Westig (10); 11. Karlheinz Busen (11); 12. Markus Herbrand (12); 13. Bernd Reuther (13); 14. Carl-Julius Cronenberg (14); 15. Katrin Helling-Plahr (15); 16. Christian Sauter (16); 17. Olaf in der Beek (17); 18. Jens Teutrine (18); 19. Manfred Todtenhausen (19)
AfD	CDU	LINKE
1. Rüdiger Lucassen (1); 2. Kay Gottschalk (2); 3. Fabian Jacobi (3); 4. Martin Renner (4); 5. Jörg Schneider (5); 6. Michael Espendiller (6); 7. Matthias Helferich (7); 8. Roger Beckamp (8); 9. Harald Weyel (9); 10. Eugen Schmidt (10); 11. Jochen Haug (11); 12. Stefan Keuter (12)	1. Armin Laschet (1); 2. Serap Güler (8); 3. Astrid Timmermann-Fechter (10); 4. Sabine Weiss (13); 5. Catarina dos Santos Firnhaber (15); 6. Michael Breilmann (16); 7. Kerstin Vieregge (17); 8. Stefan Nacke (18); 9. Oliver Vogt (19); 10. Kerstin Radomski (20); 11. Hubert Hüppe (21); 12. Jürgen Hardt (22)	1. Sahra Wagenknecht (1); 2. Matthias Birkwald (2); 3. Sevim Dağdelen (3); 4. Andrej Hunko (4); 5. Kathrin Vogler (5); 6. Christian Leye (6)

=== Saxony ===
Party	Constituency			Party list			Total seats	+/–
Party	Votes	%	Seats	Votes	%	Seats	Total seats	+/–
Alternative for Germany (AfD)	632,881	25.7	10	607,044	24.6	0	10	−1
Social Democratic Party (SPD)	410,769	16.7	1	474,804	19.3	7	8	+4
Christian Democratic Union (CDU)	546,282	22.2	4	422,879	17.2	3	7	−5
Free Democratic Party (FDP)	220,062	8.9	0	271,166	11.0	5	5	+2
The Left (DIE LINKE)	282,800	11.5	1	230,012	9.3	3	4	−2
Alliance 90/The Greens (GRÜNE)	171,384	7.0	0	212,320	8.6	4	4	+2
Free Voters	66,591	2.7	0	56,654	2.3	0	0	0
Human Environment Animal Protection Party	–	–	–	47,939	1.9	0	0	0
Grassroots Democratic Party	45,593	1.9	0	38,090	1.5	0	0	New
Die PARTEI	37,538	1.5	0	31,905	1.3	0	0	0
Party for Health Research	1,366	0.1	0	12,052	0.5	0	0	0
Pirate Party Germany	5,628	0.2	0	10,433	0.4	0	0	0
National Democratic Party	–	–	–	7,469	0.3	0	0	0
Alliance C – Christians for Germany	2,546	0.1	0	7,129	0.3	0	0	0
Volt Germany	–	–	–	6,674	0.3	0	0	New
Team Todenhöfer	–	–	–	6,229	0.3	0	0	New
Ecological Democratic Party	10,224	0.4	0	6,056	0.2	0	0	0
The III. Path	515	0.0	0	4,288	0.2	0	0	New
The Humanists	2,232	0.1	0	4,003	0.2	0	0	0
V-Partei³	1,142	0.0	0	2,464	0.1	0	0	0
German Communist Party	–	–	–	1,725	0.1	0	0	0
Marxist–Leninist Party	1,081	0.0	0	1,562	0.1	0	0	0
Liberal Conservative Reformers	1,795	0.1	0	–	–	–	0	New
Civil Rights Movement Solidarity	210	0.0	0	–	–	–	0	0
Independents & voter groups	18,940	0.8	0	–	–	–	0	–
Invalid/blank votes	29,375	–	–	26,057	–	–	–	–
Total	2,488,954	100	16	2,488,954	100	22	38	0
Registered voters/turnout	3,253,667	76.5	–	3,253,667	76.5	–	–	–
Source: Federal Returning Officer

Constituency members
#	Constituency	Previous member	Elected member	Party	Votes	%	Margin	Runner-up
151	Nordsachsen	Marian Wendt	René Bochmann	AfD	32,702	27.8	5,819	Christiane Schenderlein
152	Leipzig I	Jens Lehmann	Jens Lehmann	CDU	34,107	20.5	519	Holger Mann
153	Leipzig II	Sören Pellmann	Sören Pellmann	LINKE	40,938	22.8	7,943	Paula Piechotta
154	Leipzig-Land	Katharina Landgraf	Edgar Naujok	AfD	39,348	24.6	282	Georg-Ludwig von Breitenbuch
155	Meißen	Thomas de Maizière	Barbara Lenk	AfD	45,705	31.0	12,781	Sebastian Fischer
156	Bautzen I	Karsten Hilse	Karsten Hilse	AfD	52,492	33.4	11,563	Roland Ermer
157	Görlitz	Tino Chrupalla	Tino Chrupalla	AfD	53,970	35.8	14,671	Florian Oest
158	Sächsische Schweiz-Osterzgebirge	Frauke Petry (Note: Petry was elected for the AfD, but left the party in September 2017.)	Steffen Janich	AfD	50,203	33.0	21,027	Corinna Franke‑Wöller
159	Dresden I	Andreas Lämmel	Markus Reichel	CDU	37,811	21.1	3,939	Katja Kipping
160	Dresden II – Bautzen II	Arnold Vaatz	Lars Rohwer	CDU	35,014	18.6	35	Andreas Harlaß
161	Mittelsachsen	Veronika Bellmann	Carolin Bachmann	AfD	48,725	33.4	14,087	Veronika Bellmann
162	Chemnitz	Frank Heinrich	Detlef Müller	SPD	34,958	25.1	4,456	Michael Klonovsky
163	Chemnitzer Umland – Erzgebirgskreis II	Marco Wanderwitz	Mike Moncsek	AfD	39,264	28.9	7,153	Marco Wanderwitz
164	Erzgebirgskreis I	Alexander Krauß	Thomas Dietz	AfD	50,571	31.7	10,021	Alexander Krauß
165	Zwickau	Carsten Körber	Matthias Moosdorf	AfD	37,135	25.6	6,337	Carsten Körber
166	Vogtlandkreis	Yvonne Magwas	Yvonne Magwas	CDU	37,637	27.7	1,249	Mathias Weiser

List members
SPD	FDP	GRÜNE
1. Holger Mann (1); 2. Kathrin Michel (2); 3. Rasha Nasr (4); 4. Carlos Kasper (5); 5. Nadja Sthamer (6); 6. Fabian Funke (7); 7. Franziska Mascheck (8)	1. Torsten Herbst (1); 2. Frank Müller-Rosentritt (2); 3. Philipp Hartewig (3); 4. Ulrike Harzer (4); 5. Nico Tippelt (5)	1. Paula Piechotta (1); 2. Bernhard Herrmann (2); 3. Merle Spellerberg (3); 4. Kassem Saleh (4)
CDU	LINKE	
1. Marco Wanderwitz (1); 2. Christiane Schenderlein (2); 3. Carsten Körber (5)	1. Katja Kipping (1); 2. Caren Lay (3); 3. André Hahn (4)	

=== Hesse ===
Party	Constituency			Party list			Total seats	+/–
Party	Votes	%	Seats	Votes	%	Seats	Total seats	+/–
Social Democratic Party (SPD)	1,000,129	30.3	14	910,035	27.6	1	15	+3
Christian Democratic Union (CDU)	909,147	27.6	7	753,512	22.8	5	12	−5
Alliance 90/The Greens (GRÜNE)	480,535	14.6	1	521,411	15.8	8	9	+4
Free Democratic Party (FDP)	315,712	9.6	0	421,621	12.8	7	7	+1
Alternative for Germany (AfD)	285,337	8.7	0	290,978	8.8	5	5	−1
The Left (DIE LINKE)	130,457	4.0	0	142,585	4.3	3	3	−1
Free Voters	81,432	2.5	0	56,155	1.7	0	0	0
Human Environment Animal Protection Party	–	–	–	49,047	1.5	0	0	0
Grassroots Democratic Party	47,736	1.4	0	43,106	1.3	0	0	New
Die PARTEI	22,769	0.7	0	29,569	0.9	0	0	0
Team Todenhöfer	–	–	–	21,897	0.7	0	0	New
Volt Germany	7,725	0.2	0	19,268	0.6	0	0	New
Pirate Party Germany	4,917	0.1	0	13,152	0.4	0	0	0
Party for Health Research	–	–	–	4,891	0.1	0	0	0
National Democratic Party	–	–	–	4,511	0.1	0	0	0
Alliance C – Christians for Germany	1,353	0.0	0	4,412	0.1	0	0	0
Ecological Democratic Party	–	–	–	3,683	0.1	0	0	0
The Humanists	472	0.0	0	3,551	0.1	0	0	0
V-Partei³	–	–	–	3,128	0.1	0	0	0
German Communist Party	233	0.0	0	1,294	0.0	0	0	0
The Pinks/Alliance 21	172	0.0	0	1,166	0.0	0	0	New
Liberal Conservative Reformers	103	0.0	0	932	0.0	0	0	New
Marxist–Leninist Party	969	0.0	0	906	0.0	0	0	0
Independents for Citizen-oriented Democracy	951	0.0	0	–	–	–	0	New
Civil Rights Movement Solidarity	123	0.0	0	–	–	–	0	0
Independents & voter groups	5,661	0.2	0	–	–	–	0	–
Invalid/blank votes	44,706	–	–	39,829	–	–	–	–
Total	3,340,639	100	22	3,340,639	100	29	51	+1
Registered voters/turnout	4,383,047	76.2	–	4,383,047	76.2	–	–	–
Source: Federal Returning Officer

Constituency members
#	Constituency	Previous member	Elected member	Party	Votes	%	Margin	Runner-up
167	Waldeck	Esther Dilcher	Esther Dilcher	SPD	51,613	38.0	15,879	Armin Schwarz
168	Kassel	Timon Gremmels	Timon Gremmels	SPD	57,919	36.1	25,154	Michael Aufenanger
169	Werra-Meißner – Hersfeld-Rotenburg	Michael Roth	Michael Roth	SPD	56,383	43.7	21,856	Wilhelm Gebhard
170	Schwalm-Eder	Edgar Franke	Edgar Franke	SPD	54,792	39.3	21,349	Anna-Maria Bischof
171	Marburg	Sören Bartol	Sören Bartol	SPD	51,630	36.9	15,102	Stefan Heck
172	Lahn-Dill	Hans-Jürgen Irmer	Dagmar Schmidt	SPD	49,923	33.1	4,482	Hans-Jürgen Irmer
173	Gießen	Helge Braun	Felix Döring	SPD	48,514	30.4	1,231	Helge Braun
174	Fulda	Michael Brand	Michael Brand	CDU	61,573	38.1	26,405	Birgit Kömpel
175	Main-Kinzig – Wetterau II – Schotten	Peter Tauber	Bettina Müller	SPD	41,160	30.5	4,042	Johannes Wiegelmann
176	Hochtaunus	Markus Koob	Markus Koob	CDU	44,549	31.3	6,125	Alicia Bokler
177	Wetterau I	Oswin Veith	Natalie Pawlik	SPD	40,618	29.7	1,811	Armin Häuser
178	Rheingau-Taunus – Limburg	Klaus-Peter Willsch	Klaus-Peter Willsch	CDU	51,318	30.2	2,877	Martin Rabanus
179	Wiesbaden	Ingmar Jung	Ingmar Jung	CDU	35,375	26.3	625	Nadine Ruf
180	Hanau	Katja Leikert	Lennard Oehl	SPD	40,291	31.1	4,272	Katja Leikert
181	Main-Taunus	Norbert Altenkamp	Norbert Altenkamp	CDU	51,985	33.3	16,492	Ilja-Kristin Seewald
182	Frankfurt am Main I	Matthias Zimmer	Armand Zorn	SPD	41,604	29.0	10,441	Axel Kaufmann
183	Frankfurt am Main II	Bettina Wiesmann	Omid Nouripour	GRÜNE	50,230	29.0	9,799	Kaweh Mansoori
184	Groß-Gerau	Stefan Sauer	Melanie Wegling	SPD	42,598	33.5	7,264	Stefan Sauer
185	Offenbach	Björn Simon	Björn Simon	CDU	43,347	27.8	2,312	Tuna Firat
186	Darmstadt	Astrid Mannes	Andreas Larem	SPD	51,046	27.4	6,682	Daniela Wagner
187	Odenwald	Patricia Lips	Jens Zimmermann	SPD	57,172	32.3	7,805	Patricia Lips
188	Bergstraße	Michael Meister	Michael Meister	CDU	46,125	30.5	5,001	Sven Wingerter

List members
GRÜNE	FDP	CDU
1. Bettina Hoffmann (1); 2. Kordula Schulz-Asche (3); 3. Wolfgang Strengmann-Kuhn (4); 4. Anna Lührmann (5); 5. Philip Krämer (6); 6. Deborah Düring (7); 7. Boris Mijatović (8); 8. Awet Tesfaiesus (9)	1. Bettina Stark-Watzinger (1); 2. Thorsten Lieb (2); 3. Till Mansmann (3); 4. Alexander Müller (4); 5. Jürgen Lenders (5); 6. Katja Adler (6); 7. Peter Heidt (7)	1. Helge Braun (1); 2. Patricia Lips (2); 3. Katja Leikert (5); 4. Armin Schwarz (6); 5. Stefan Heck (7)
AfD	LINKE	SPD
1. Mariana Harder-Kühnel (1); 2. Joana Cotar (2); 3. Uwe Schulz (3); 4. Jan Nolte (4); 5. Albrecht Glaser (5)	1. Janine Wissler (1); 2. Ali Al-Dailami (2); 3. Christine Buchholz (3)	1. Kaweh Mansoori (3)

=== Thuringia ===
Party	Constituency			Party list			Total seats	+/–
Party	Votes	%	Seats	Votes	%	Seats	Total seats	+/–
Alternative for Germany (AfD)	298,971	23.7	4	303,233	24.0	1	5	0
Social Democratic Party (SPD)	299,024	23.7	3	296,446	23.4	2	5	+2
Christian Democratic Union (CDU)	264,026	20.9	1	213,414	16.9	2	3	−5
The Left (DIE LINKE)	155,618	12.3	0	144,693	11.4	3	3	0
Free Democratic Party (FDP)	89,008	7.0	0	114,283	9.0	2	2	0
Alliance 90/The Greens (GRÜNE)	68,185	5.4	0	83,220	6.6	1	1	0
Free Voters	31,190	2.5	0	27,151	2.1	0	0	0
Grassroots Democratic Party	19,932	1.6	0	20,189	1.6	0	0	New
Human Environment Animal Protection Party	–	–	–	18,973	1.5	0	0	0
Die PARTEI	22,882	1.8	0	16,013	1.3	0	0	0
Pirate Party Germany	1,313	0.1	0	6,291	0.5	0	0	0
National Democratic Party	–	–	–	4,103	0.3	0	0	0
Volt Germany	–	–	–	3,566	0.3	0	0	New
Human World	–	–	–	3,400	0.3	0	0	0
Marxist–Leninist Party	3,875	0.3	0	2,570	0.2	0	0	0
Team Todenhöfer	–	–	–	2,501	0.2	0	0	New
Ecological Democratic Party	2,715	0.2	0	2,456	0.2	0	0	0
The Humanists	–	–	–	1,357	0.1	0	0	0
V-Partei³	–	–	–	1,052	0.1	0	0	0
Grey Panthers	961	0.1	0	–	–	–	0	New
Thuringian Homeland Party	549	0.0	0	–	–	–	0	New
Liberal Conservative Reformers	338	0.0	0	–	–	–	0	New
Independents & voter groups	4,494	0.4	0	–	–	–	0	–
Invalid/blank votes	16,639	–	–	14,809	–	–	–	–
Total	1,279,720	100	8	1,279,720	100	11	19	−3
Registered voters/turnout	1,707,726	74.9	–	1,707,726	74.9	–	–	–
Source: Federal Returning Officer

Constituency members
#	Constituency	Previous member	Elected member	Party	Votes	%	Margin	Runner-up
189	Eichsfeld – Nordhausen – Kyffhäuserkreis	Manfred Grund	Manfred Grund	CDU	40,599	26.6	5,954	Jürgen Pohl
190	Eisenach – Wartburgkreis – Unstrut-Hainich-Kreis	Christian Hirte	Klaus Stöber	AfD	38,166	24.8	1,437	Tina Rudolph
191	Jena – Sömmerda – Weimarer Land I	Johannes Selle	Holger Becker	SPD	30,673	20.1	1,095	Torben Braga
192	Gotha – Ilm-Kreis	Tankred Schipanski	Marcus Bühl	AfD	37,249	26.5	4,164	Michael Müller
193	Erfurt – Weimar – Weimarer Land II	Antje Tillmann	Carsten Schneider	SPD	40,185	24.4	11,546	Antje Tillmann
194	Gera – Greiz – Altenburger Land	Volkmar Vogel	Stephan Brandner	AfD	48,034	29.0	11,274	Elisabeth Kaiser
195	Saalfeld-Rudolstadt – Saale-Holzland-Kreis – Saale-Orla-Kreis	Albert Weiler	Michael Kaufmann	AfD	48,177	29.3	13,688	Albert Weiler
196	Suhl – Schmalkalden-Meiningen – Hildburghausen – Sonneberg	Mark Hauptmann	Frank Ullrich	SPD	56,791	33.6	19,062	Hans-Georg Maaßen

List members
LINKE	SPD	CDU
1. Susanne Hennig-Wellsow (1); 2. Ralph Lenkert (2); 3. Martina Renner (3)	1. Elisabeth Kaiser (2); 2. Tina Rudolph (4)	1. Christian Hirte (1); 2. Antje Tillmann (2)
FDP	AfD	GRÜNE
1. Gerald Ullrich (1); 2. Reginald Hanke (2)	1. Jürgen Pohl (2)	1. Katrin Göring-Eckardt (1)

=== Rhineland-Palatinate ===
Party	Constituency			Party list			Total seats	+/–
Party	Votes	%	Seats	Votes	%	Seats	Total seats	+/–
Social Democratic Party (SPD)	697,183	30.0	8	685,534	29.4	4	12	+3
Christian Democratic Union (CDU)	686,825	29.5	7	576,533	24.7	2	9	−5
Alliance 90/The Greens (GRÜNE)	247,246	10.6	0	293,135	12.6	5	5	+2
Free Democratic Party (FDP)	193,360	8.3	0	272,451	11.7	5	5	+1
Alternative for Germany (AfD)	205,790	8.8	0	215,205	9.2	4	4	0
Free Voters	116,525	5.0	0	84,396	3.6	0	0	0
The Left (DIE LINKE)	84,143	3.6	0	76,123	3.3	1	1	−2
Human Environment Animal Protection Party	9,487	0.4	0	35,759	1.5	0	0	0
Grassroots Democratic Party	31,791	1.4	0	28,719	1.2	0	0	New
Die PARTEI	21,564	0.9	0	20,844	0.9	0	0	0
Volt Germany	10,420	0.4	0	11,110	0.5	0	0	New
Pirate Party Germany	1,118	0.0	0	9,530	0.4	0	0	0
Team Todenhöfer	–	–	–	8,578	0.4	0	0	New
Ecological Democratic Party	8,062	0.3	0	5,661	0.2	0	0	0
National Democratic Party	–	–	–	2,779	0.1	0	0	0
The Humanists	486	0.0	0	2,284	0.1	0	0	0
V-Partei³	–	–	–	2,202	0.1	0	0	0
Democracy in Motion	–	–	–	1,796	0.1	0	0	0
Liberal Conservative Reformers	573	0.0	0	1,044	0.0	0	0	New
Marxist–Leninist Party	157	0.0	0	469	0.0	0	0	0
Independents for Citizen-oriented Democracy	1,140	0.0	0	–	–	–	0	New
German Communist Party	294	0.0	0	–	–	–	0	0
Independents & voter groups	9,505	0.4	0	–	–	–	0	–
Invalid/blank votes	31,352	–	–	22,869	–	–	–	–
Total	2,357,021	100	15	2,357,021	100	21	36	−1
Registered voters/turnout	3,053,335	77.2	–	3,053,335	77.2	–	–	–
Source: Federal Returning Officer

Constituency members
#	Constituency	Previous member	Elected member	Party	Votes	%	Margin	Runner-up
197	Neuwied	Erwin Rüddel	Erwin Rüddel	CDU	57,430	31.9	3,110	Martin Diedenhofen
198	Ahrweiler	Mechthild Heil	Mechthild Heil	CDU	50,281	34.3	5,956	Christoph Schmitt
199	Koblenz	Josef Oster	Josef Oster	CDU	46,073	31.7	2,657	Thorsten Rudolph
200	Mosel/Rhein-Hunsrück	Peter Bleser	Marlon Bröhr	CDU	45,364	34.3	9,794	Michael Maurer
201	Kreuznach	Antje Lezius	Joe Weingarten	SPD	44,976	33.0	5,387	Julia Klöckner
202	Bitburg	Patrick Schnieder	Patrick Schnieder	CDU	46,340	37.8	12,708	Lena Werner
203	Trier	Andreas Steier	Verena Hubertz	SPD	47,942	33.0	7,643	Andreas Steier
204	Montabaur	Andreas Nick	Tanja Machalet	SPD	50,975	31.5	2,368	Andreas Nick
205	Mainz	Ursula Groden-Kranich	Daniel Baldy	SPD	49,878	24.9	2,725	Ursula Groden-Kranich
206	Worms	Jan Metzler	Jan Metzler	CDU	52,827	32.2	3,079	David Maier
207	Ludwigshafen/Frankenthal	Torbjörn Kartes	Christian Schreider	SPD	50,108	32.8	11,915	Torbjörn Kartes
208	Neustadt – Speyer	Johannes Steiniger	Johannes Steiniger	CDU	51,770	30.2	3,612	Isabel Mackensen-Geis
209	Kaiserslautern	Gustav Herzog	Matthias Mieves	SPD	56,523	33.9	20,720	Xaver Jung
210	Pirmasens	Anita Schäfer	Angelika Glöckner	SPD	39,711	30.4	475	Florian Bilic
211	Südpfalz	Thomas Gebhart	Thomas Hitschler	SPD	47,901	28.2	41	Thomas Gebhart

List members
GRÜNE	FDP	SPD
1. Tabea Rößner (1); 2. Tobias Lindner (2); 3. Corinna Rüffer (3); 4. Armin Grau (4); 5. Misbah Khan (5)	1. Volker Wissing (1); 2. Carina Konrad (2); 3. Mario Brandenburg (3); 4. Sandra Weeser (4); 5. Manuel Höferlin (5)	1. Thorsten Rudolph (3); 2. Isabel Mackensen-Geis (4); 3. Martin Diedenhofen (7); 4. Lena Werner (10)
AfD	CDU	LINKE
1. Sebastian Münzenmaier (1); 2. Nicole Höchst (2); 3. Andreas Bleck (3); 4. Bernd Schattner (4)	1. Julia Klöckner (1); 2. Thomas Gebhart (3)	1. Alexander Ulrich (1)

=== Bavaria ===
Party	Constituency			Party list			Total seats	+/–
Party	Votes	%	Seats	Votes	%	Seats	Total seats	+/–
Christian Social Union in Bavaria (CSU)	2,788,048	36.9	45	2,402,827	31.7	0	45	−1
Social Democratic Party (SPD)	1,316,303	17.4	0	1,361,242	18.0	23	23	+5
Alliance 90/The Greens (GRÜNE)	1,023,735	13.6	1	1,067,830	14.1	18	19	+8
Free Democratic Party (FDP)	579,804	7.7	0	798,591	10.5	14	14	+2
Alternative for Germany (AfD)	634,098	8.4	0	679,915	9.0	12	12	−2
Free Voters	587,357	7.8	0	566,880	7.5	0	0	0
The Left (DIE LINKE)	187,530	2.5	0	210,838	2.8	4	4	−3
Grassroots Democratic Party	156,556	2.1	0	131,988	1.7	0	0	New
Human Environment Animal Protection Party	20,429	0.3	0	80,911	1.1	0	0	0
Die PARTEI	60,435	0.8	0	53,876	0.7	0	0	0
Ecological Democratic Party	96,378	1.3	0	51,124	0.7	0	0	0
Bavaria Party	36,748	0.5	0	32,790	0.4	0	0	0
Pirate Party Germany	9,150	0.1	0	25,865	0.3	0	0	0
Team Todenhöfer	3,096	0.0	0	24,629	0.3	0	0	New
Volt Germany	14,028	0.2	0	21,434	0.3	0	0	New
Independents for Citizen-oriented Democracy	1,952	0.0	0	13,623	0.2	0	0	New
Party for Health Research	–	–	–	8,524	0.1	0	0	0
V-Partei³	6,678	0.1	0	8,331	0.1	0	0	0
The Humanists	1,434	0.0	0	6,689	0.1	0	0	0
National Democratic Party	447	0.0	0	5,743	0.1	0	0	0
Alliance C – Christians for Germany	466	0.0	0	5,574	0.1	0	0	0
The Urbans. A HipHop Party	793	0.0	0	4,200	0.1	0	0	0
The III. Path	–	–	–	3,544	0.0	0	0	New
Liberal Conservative Reformers	1,861	0.0	0	1,806	0.0	0	0	New
German Communist Party	–	–	–	1,288	0.0	0	0	0
Marxist–Leninist Party	1,258	0.0	0	1,251	0.0	0	0	0
Civil Rights Movement Solidarity	416	0.0	0	–	–	–	0	0
Independents & voter groups	24,116	0.3	0	–	–	–	0	–
Invalid/blank votes	55,864	–	–	37,667	–	–	–	–
Total	7,608,980	100	46	7,608,980	100	71	117	+9
Registered voters/turnout	9,517,664	79.9	–	9,517,664	79.9	–	–	–
Source: Federal Returning Officer

Constituency members
#	Constituency	Previous member	Elected member	Party	Votes	%	Margin	Runner-up
212	Altötting	Stephan Mayer	Stephan Mayer	CSU	55,693	43.3	41,073	Annette Heidrich
213	Erding – Ebersberg	Andreas Lenz	Andreas Lenz	CSU	70,656	42.3	45,816	Christoph Lochmüller
214	Freising	Erich Irlstorfer	Erich Irlstorfer	CSU	69,689	36.2	43,739	Andreas Mehltretter
215	Fürstenfeldbruck	Katrin Staffler	Katrin Staffler	CSU	72,721	38.0	35,890	Michael Schrodi
216	Ingolstadt	Reinhard Brandl	Reinhard Brandl	CSU	83,663	44.9	57,709	Jessica Meier
217	Munich North	Bernhard Loos	Bernhard Loos	CSU	44,854	25.7	2,535	Doris Wagner
218	Munich East	Wolfgang Stefinger	Wolfgang Stefinger	CSU	61,159	31.7	18,792	Vaniessa Rashid
219	Munich South	Michael Kuffer	Jamila Schäfer	GRÜNE	47,256	27.5	1,197	Michael Kuffer
220	Munich West/Centre	Stephan Pilsinger	Stephan Pilsinger	CSU	53,311	27.0	137	Dieter Janecek
221	Munich Land	Florian Hahn	Florian Hahn	CSU	77,523	39.1	37,048	Anton Hofreiter
222	Rosenheim	Daniela Ludwig	Daniela Ludwig	CSU	68,670	36.1	42,487	Victoria Broßart
223	Bad Tölz-Wolfratshausen – Miesbach	Alexander Radwan	Alexander Radwan	CSU	55,501	41.3	34,672	Karl Bär
224	Starnberg – Landsberg am Lech	Michael Kießling	Michael Kießling	CSU	68,617	38.2	32,808	Martina Neubauer
225	Traunstein	Peter Ramsauer	Peter Ramsauer	CSU	59,555	36.6	31,911	Bärbel Kofler
226	Weilheim	Alexander Dobrindt	Alexander Dobrindt	CSU	57,179	41.9	37,497	Sigrid Meierhofer
227	Deggendorf	Thomas Erndl	Thomas Erndl	CSU	47,267	37.4	27,549	Martin Behringer
228	Landshut	Florian Oßner	Florian Oßner	CSU	70,685	36.4	47,911	Nicole Bauer
229	Passau	Andreas Scheuer	Andreas Scheuer	CSU	41,530	30.7	13,189	Johannes Schätzl
230	Rottal-Inn	Max Straubinger	Max Straubinger	CSU	46,493	35.1	24,335	Werner Schießl
231	Straubing	Alois Rainer	Alois Rainer	CSU	58,487	44.3	41,693	Corinna Miazga
232	Amberg	Alois Karl	Susanne Hierl	CSU	69,278	40.3	41,802	Johannes Foitzik
233	Regensburg	Peter Aumer	Peter Aumer	CSU	69,842	35.3	36,992	Carolin Wagner
234	Schwandorf	Karl Holmeier	Martina Englhardt-Kopf	CSU	60,924	35.1	21,309	Marianne Schieder
235	Weiden	Albert Rupprecht	Albert Rupprecht	CSU	50,575	38.5	21,002	Uli Grötsch
236	Bamberg	Thomas Silberhorn	Thomas Silberhorn	CSU	54,726	37.0	26,603	Andreas Schwarz
237	Bayreuth	Silke Launert	Silke Launert	CSU	54,465	42.4	29,625	Annette Kramme
238	Coburg	Hans Michelbach	Jonas Geissler	CSU	44,890	36.5	12,834	Ramona Brehm
239	Hof	Hans-Peter Friedrich	Hans-Peter Friedrich	CSU	51,312	41.2	21,549	Jörg Nürnberger
240	Kulmbach	Emmi Zeulner	Emmi Zeulner	CSU	65,163	47.8	43,060	Simon Moritz
241	Ansbach	Artur Auernhammer	Artur Auernhammer	CSU	73,312	38.4	39,493	Harry Scheuenstuhl
242	Erlangen	Stefan Müller	Stefan Müller	CSU	54,223	35.1	22,187	Martina Stamm-Fibich
243	Fürth	Christian Schmidt	Tobias Winkler	CSU	65,876	33.5	18,723	Carsten Träger
244	Nuremberg North	Sebastian Brehm	Sebastian Brehm	CSU	41,027	28.5	8,486	Tessa Ganserer
245	Nuremberg South	Michael Frieser	Michael Frieser	CSU	44,192	34.4	13,094	Thomas Grämmer
246	Roth	Marlene Mortler	Ralph Edelhäußer	CSU	71,478	38.0	39,672	Jan Plobner
247	Aschaffenburg	Andrea Lindholz	Andrea Lindholz	CSU	59,269	40.7	34,376	Tobias Wüst
248	Bad Kissingen	Dorothee Bär	Dorothee Bär	CSU	67,458	39.1	34,614	Sabine Dittmar
249	Main-Spessart	Alexander Hoffmann	Alexander Hoffmann	CSU	60,489	38.6	26,789	Bernd Rützel
250	Schweinfurt	Anja Weisgerber	Anja Weisgerber	CSU	63,697	40.9	34,660	Markus Hümpfer
251	Würzburg	Paul Lehrieder	Paul Lehrieder	CSU	67,651	36.9	31,356	Sebastian Hansen
252	Augsburg-Stadt	Volker Ullrich	Volker Ullrich	CSU	42,780	28.1	11,433	Claudia Roth
253	Augsburg-Land	Hansjörg Durz	Hansjörg Durz	CSU	82,423	40.6	52,988	Heike Heubach
254	Donau-Ries	Ulrich Lange	Ulrich Lange	CSU	64,045	41.1	34,173	Christoph Schmid
255	Neu-Ulm	Georg Nüßlein (Note: Nüßlein was elected for the CSU, but left the party in March 2021.)	Alexander Engelhard	CSU	69,676	37.2	39,716	Karl Brunner
256	Oberallgäu	Gerd Müller	Mechthilde Wittmann	CSU	53,566	29.7	25,165	Martin Holderied
257	Ostallgäu	Stephan Stracke	Stephan Stracke	CSU	76,399	38.8	52,111	Regina Leenders

List members
SPD	GRÜNE	FDP
1. Uli Grötsch (1); 2. Bärbel Kofler (2); 3. Carsten Träger (3); 4. Anette Kramme (4); 5. Sebastian Roloff (5); 6. Rita Hagl-Kehl (6); 7. Bernd Rützel (7); 8. Gabriela Heinrich (8); 9. Christoph Schmid (9); 10. Claudia Tausend (10); 11. Andreas Schwarz (11); 12. Marianne Schieder (12); 13. Michael Schrodi (13); 14. Sabine Dittmar (14); 15. Andreas Mehltretter (15); 16. Ulrike Bahr (16); 17. Johannes Schätzl (17); 18. Martina Stamm-Fibich (18); 19. Jörg Nürnberger (19); 20. Carmen Wegge (20); 21. Markus Hümpfer (21); 22. Carolin Wagner (22); 23. Jan Plobner (23)	1. Claudia Roth (1); 2. Anton Hofreiter (2); 3. Ekin Deligöz (3); 4. Dieter Janecek (4); 5. Manuela Rottmann (5); 6. Sascha Müller (6); 7. Erhard Grundl (8); 8. Lisa Badum (9); 9. Stefan Schmidt (10); 10. Saskia Weishaupt (11); 11. Karl Bär (12); 12. Tessa Ganserer (13); 13. Niklas Wagener (14); 14. Marlene Schönberger (15); 15. Johannes Wagner (16); 16. Tina Winklmann (17); 17. Leon Eckert (18); 18. Beate Walter-Rosenheimer (19)	1. Daniel Föst (1); 2. Katja Hessel (2); 3. Karsten Klein (3); 4. Lukas Köhler (4); 5. Thomas Sattelberger (5); 6. Stephan Thomae (6); 7. Nicole Bauer (7); 8. Ulrich Lechte (8); 9. Sandra Bubendorfer-Licht (9); 10. Andrew Ullmann (10); 11. Maximilian Funke-Kaiser (11); 12. Kristine Lütke (12); 13. Thomas Hacker (13); 14. Muhanad Al-Halak (14)
AfD	LINKE	
1. Peter Boehringer (1); 2. Corinna Miazga (2); 3. Stephan Protschka (3); 4. Petr Bystron (4); 5. Martin Sichert (5); 6. Johannes Huber (6); 7. Wolfgang Wiehle (7); 8. Rainer Kraft (8); 9. Gerold Otten (9); 10. Tobias Peterka (10); 11. Peter Felser (11); 12. Gerrit Huy (12)	1. Nicole Gohlke (1); 2. Klaus Ernst (2); 3. Susanne Ferschl (3); 4. Ates Gürpinar (4)	

=== Baden-Württemberg ===
Party	Constituency			Party list			Total seats	+/–
Party	Votes	%	Seats	Votes	%	Seats	Total seats	+/–
Christian Democratic Union (CDU)	1,767,316	29.7	33	1,477,612	24.8	0	33	−5
Social Democratic Party (SPD)	1,247,455	21.0	1	1,287,934	21.6	21	22	+6
Alliance 90/The Greens (GRÜNE)	1,058,334	17.8	4	1,022,226	17.2	14	18	+5
Free Democratic Party (FDP)	711,697	12.0	0	908,039	15.3	16	16	+4
Alternative for Germany (AfD)	561,058	9.4	0	571,336	9.6	10	10	−1
The Left (DIE LINKE)	175,691	3.0	0	196,874	3.3	3	3	−3
Grassroots Democratic Party	127,340	2.1	0	114,919	1.9	0	0	New
Free Voters	143,422	2.4	0	103,611	1.7	0	0	0
Human Environment Animal Protection Party	21,822	0.4	0	74,702	1.3	0	0	0
Die PARTEI	73,115	1.2	0	53,597	0.9	0	0	0
Team Todenhöfer	–	–	–	26,780	0.5	0	0	New
Pirate Party Germany	3,438	0.1	0	21,530	0.4	0	0	0
Volt Germany	11,146	0.2	0	20,620	0.3	0	0	New
Ecological Democratic Party	17,041	0.3	0	17,637	0.3	0	0	0
Alliance C – Christians for Germany	452	0.0	0	12,625	0.2	0	0	0
Citizens' Movement	1,556	0.0	0	7,491	0.1	0	0	New
Party for Health Research	–	–	–	7,059	0.1	0	0	0
The Humanists	4,702	0.1	0	6,775	0.1	0	0	0
National Democratic Party	–	–	–	6,036	0.1	0	0	0
Democracy in Motion	2,609	0.0	0	5,388	0.1	0	0	0
Marxist–Leninist Party	3,541	0.1	0	2,248	0.0	0	0	0
The Pinks/Alliance 21	–	–	–	1,936	0.0	0	0	New
Liberal Conservative Reformers	508	0.0	0	1,578	0.0	0	0	New
German Communist Party	–	–	–	1,107	0.0	0	0	0
Climate List Baden-Württemberg	3,957	0.1	0	–	–	–	0	New
V-Partei³	550	0.0	0	–	–	–	0	0
Human World	351	0.0	0	–	–	–	0	0
Civil Rights Movement Solidarity	62	0.0	0	–	–	–	0	0
Independents & voter groups	5,570	0.1	0	–	–	–	0	–
Invalid/blank votes	54,574	–	–	47,657	–	–	–	–
Total	5,997,317	100	38	5,997,317	100	64	102	+6
Registered voters/turnout	7,711,531	77.8	–	7,711,531	77.8	–	–	–
Source: Federal Returning Officer

Constituency members
#	Constituency	Previous member	Elected member	Party	Votes	%	Margin	Runner-up
258	Stuttgart I	Stefan Kaufmann	Cem Özdemir	GRÜNE	62,594	39.9	25,989	Stefan Kaufmann
259	Stuttgart II	Karin Maag	Maximilian Mörseburg	CDU	34,312	25.9	2,866	Anna Christmann
260	Böblingen	Marc Biadacz	Marc Biadacz	CDU	57,504	29.7	16,660	Jasmina Hostert
261	Esslingen	Markus Grübel	Markus Grübel	CDU	41,976	32.0	13,475	Argyri Paraschaki
262	Nürtingen	Michael Hennrich	Michael Hennrich	CDU	49,506	30.1	14,889	Nils Schmid
263	Göppingen	Hermann Färber	Hermann Färber	CDU	41,558	31.0	9,734	Heike Baehrens
264	Waiblingen	Joachim Pfeiffer	Christina Stumpp	CDU	50,566	29.0	10,924	Urs Abelein
265	Ludwigsburg	Steffen Bilger	Steffen Bilger	CDU	50,297	29.5	15,634	Sandra Detzer
266	Neckar-Zaber	Eberhard Gienger	Fabian Gramling	CDU	56,249	30.4	14,541	Thomas Utz
267	Heilbronn	Alexander Throm	Alexander Throm	CDU	50,299	27.8	6,412	Josip Juratovic
268	Schwäbisch Hall – Hohenlohe	Christian von Stetten	Christian von Stetten	CDU	54,894	32.1	21,326	Kevin Leiser
269	Backnang – Schwäbisch Gmünd	Norbert Barthle	Ingeborg Gräßle	CDU	41,176	30.5	8,272	Tim-Luka Schwab
270	Aalen – Heidenheim	Roderich Kiesewetter	Roderich Kiesewetter	CDU	61,832	37.0	25,331	Leni Breymaier
271	Karlsruhe-Stadt	Ingo Wellenreuther	Zoe Mayer	GRÜNE	47,473	30.0	13,843	Parsa Marvi
272	Karlsruhe-Land	Axel Fischer	Nicolas Zippelius	CDU	50,581	30.4	12,633	Patrick Diebold
273	Rastatt	Kai Whittaker	Kai Whittaker	CDU	50,988	33.2	16,141	Gabriele Katzmarek
274	Heidelberg	Karl A. Lamers	Franziska Brantner	GRÜNE	53,288	30.2	10,706	Alexander Föhr
275	Mannheim	Nikolas Löbel	Isabel Cademartori	SPD	37,102	26.4	5,379	Melis Sekmen
276	Odenwald – Tauber	Alois Gerig	Nina Warken	CDU	57,391	35.8	24,308	Anja Lotz
277	Rhein-Neckar	Stephan Harbarth	Moritz Oppelt	CDU	43,487	28.5	2,292	Lars Castellucci
278	Bruchsal – Schwetzingen	Olav Gutting	Olav Gutting	CDU	44,465	29.6	11,629	Nezaket Yildirim
279	Pforzheim	Gunther Krichbaum	Gunther Krichbaum	CDU	46,291	28.5	12,334	Katja Mast
280	Calw	Hans-Joachim Fuchtel	Klaus Mack	CDU	51,208	33.8	25,097	Saskia Esken
281	Freiburg	Matern von Marschall	Chantal Kopf	GRÜNE	51,777	28.8	4,579	Julia Söhne
282	Lörrach – Müllheim	Armin Schuster	Diana Stöcker	CDU	43,509	25.2	6,013	Takis Mehmet Ali
283	Emmendingen – Lahr	Peter Weiß	Yannick Bury	CDU	46,406	27.8	90	Johannes Fechner
284	Offenburg	Wolfgang Schäuble	Wolfgang Schäuble	CDU	54,148	34.9	25,145	Matthias Katsch
285	Rottweil – Tuttlingen	Volker Kauder	Maria-Lena Weiss	CDU	46,535	31.5	21,751	Andreas Anton
286	Schwarzwald-Baar	Thorsten Frei	Thorsten Frei	CDU	44,188	36.4	22,192	Derya Türk-Nachbaur
287	Konstanz	Andreas Jung	Andreas Jung	CDU	53,362	34.1	21,876	Lina Seitzl
288	Waldshut	Felix Schreiner	Felix Schreiner	CDU	45,335	33.6	10,886	Rita Schwarzelühr-Sutter
289	Reutlingen	Michael Donth	Michael Donth	CDU	49,631	32.5	22,395	Ulrich Bausch
290	Tübingen	Annette Widmann-Mauz	Annette Widmann-Mauz	CDU	43,024	27.0	2,046	Christian Kühn
291	Ulm	Ronja Kemmer	Ronja Kemmer	CDU	57,608	32.7	24,596	Marcel Emmerich
292	Biberach	Josef Rief	Josef Rief	CDU	46,458	35.1	21,891	Martin Gerster
293	Bodensee	Lothar Riebsamen	Volker Mayer-Lay	CDU	41,624	30.4	13,123	Leon Hahn
294	Ravensburg	Axel Müller	Axel Müller	CDU	44,597	30.6	13,854	Agnieszka Brugger
295	Zollernalb – Sigmaringen	Thomas Bareiß	Thomas Bareiß	CDU	41,106	30.1	16,136	Robin Mesarosch

List members
SPD	FDP	GRÜNE
1. Saskia Esken (1); 2. Nils Schmid (2); 3. Rita Schwarzelühr-Sutter (3); 4. Martin Rosemann (4); 5. Katja Mast (5); 6. Johannes Fechner (6); 7. Leni Breymaier (7); 8. Martin Gerster (8); 9. Jasmina Hostert (9); 10. Lars Castellucci (10); 11. Gabriele Katzmarek (11); 12. Parsa Marvi (12); 13. Heike Baehrens (13); 14. Macit Karaahmetoǧlu (14); 15. Lina Seitzl (15); 16. Robin Mesarosch (16); 17. Josip Juratovic (18); 18. Derya Türk-Nachbaur (19); 19. Kevin Leiser (20); 20. Heike Engelhardt (21); 21. Takis Mehmet Ali (22)	1. Michael Theurer (1); 2. Judith Skudelny (2); 3. Michael Georg Link (3); 4. Pascal Kober (4); 5. Florian Toncar (5); 6. Benjamin Strasser (6); 7. Renata Alt (7); 8. Jens Brandenburg (8); 9. Christoph Hoffmann (9); 10. ~~Christian Jung (10)~~ (Note: Jung declined his mandate after the election.); 11. Stephan Seiter (11); 12. Valentin Abel (12); 13. Konrad Stockmeier (13); 14. Ann-Veruschka Jurisch (14); 15. Rainer Semet (15); 16. Martin Gaßner-Herz (16); 17. Claudia Raffelhüschen (17)	1. Agnieszka Brugger (3); 2. Christian Kühn (4); 3. Sandra Detzer (5); 4. Beate Müller-Gemmeke (6); 5. Harald Ebner (7); 6. Anna Christmann (8); 7. Matthias Gastel (9); 8. Ricarda Lang (10); 9. Marcel Emmerich (11); 10. Tobias Bacherle (13); 11. Stephanie Aeffner (15); 12. Melis Sekmen (16); 13. Sebastian Schäfer (17); 14. Anja Reinalter (18)
AfD	LINKE	CDU
1. Alice Weidel (1); 2. Martin Hess (2); 3. Dirk Spaniel (3); 4. Markus Frohnmaier (4); 5. Marc Jongen (5); 6. Marc Bernhard (6); 7. Malte Kaufmann (7); 8. Christina Baum (8); 9. Thomas Seitz (9); 10. Jürgen Braun (10)	1. Bernd Riexinger (1); 2. Gökay Akbulut (2); 3. Jessica Tatti (3)	1. Alexander Föhr (6) (Note: Took the seat of Michael Hennrich in 2023)

=== Saarland ===
Party	Constituency			Party list			Total seats	+/–
Party	Votes	%	Seats	Votes	%	Seats	Total seats	+/–
Social Democratic Party (SPD)	208,329	36.4	4	213,777	37.3	0	4	+1
Christian Democratic Union (CDU)	159,323	27.8	0	135,134	23.6	2	2	−1
Free Democratic Party (FDP)	46,793	8.2	0	65,945	11.5	1	1	0
Alternative for Germany (AfD)	56,236	9.8	0	57,629	10.0	1	1	0
The Left (DIE LINKE)	30,211	5.3	0	41,130	7.2	1	1	0
Human Environment Animal Protection Party	–	–	–	16,231	2.8	0	0	0
Free Voters	14,936	2.6	0	11,746	2.0	0	0	0
Die PARTEI	13,840	2.4	0	9,978	1.7	0	0	0
Grassroots Democratic Party	8,982	1.6	0	8,116	1.4	0	0	New
Volt Germany	–	–	–	4,019	0.7	0	0	New
Pirate Party Germany	–	–	–	3,419	0.6	0	0	0
Ecological Democratic Party	2,872	0.5	0	2,531	0.4	0	0	0
Team Todenhöfer	–	–	–	2,281	0.4	0	0	New
National Democratic Party	–	–	–	1,375	0.2	0	0	0
Marxist–Leninist Party	201	0.0	0	357	0.1	0	0	0
Alliance 90/The Greens (GRÜNE)	31,091	5.4	0	–	–	–	0	−1
Independents & voter groups	299	0.1	0	–	–	–	0	–
Invalid/blank votes	10,850	–	–	10,295	–	–	–	–
Total	583,963	100	4	583,963	100	5	9	−1
Registered voters/turnout	755,223	77.3	–	755,223	77.3	–	–	–
Source: Federal Returning Officer

Constituency members
#	Constituency	Previous member	Elected member	Party	Votes	%	Margin	Runner-up
296	Saarbrücken	Josephine Ortleb	Josephine Ortleb	SPD	51,749	36.9	16,497	Annegret Kramp-Karrenbauer
297	Saarlouis	Peter Altmaier	Heiko Maas	SPD	57,354	36.7	13,683	Peter Altmaier
298	St. Wendel	Nadine Schön	Christian Petry	SPD	48,135	35.1	4,207	Nadine Schön
299	Homburg	Markus Uhl	Esra Limbacher	SPD	51,091	36.6	14,619	Markus Uhl

List members
CDU	FDP	SPD
1. ~~Annegret Kramp-Karrenbauer (1)~~ (Note: Kramp-Karrenbauer declined her mandate after the election.); 2. ~~Peter Altmaier (2)~~ (Note: Altmaier declined his mandate after the election.); 3. Nadine Schön (3); 4. Markus Uhl (4)	1. Oliver Luksic (1)	1. Emily Vontz (4) (Note: Took the seat of Heiko Maas in 2023)
AfD	LINKE	
1. Christian Wirth (1)	1. Thomas Lutze (1)	

== Members who lost their seats ==
This is a list of MPs who lost their seat at the 2021 German federal election. All of these members sat in the 19th Bundestag but were not returned to Parliament in the elections.

Those listed include members who were elected in 2017 who lost their constituencies through the first vote in 2021 and were not re-elected via state lists. Also included are List MPs who did not succeed on the second vote.

Outlisted means the MP did not win a direct mandate, and also did not win a seat on the state list.

Party	Name	Constituency	State	Year became (MdB)	Seat held by party since	Defeated by	Party
DIE LINKE	Doris Achelwilm	Bremen II – Bremerhaven	Bremen	2017	Outlisted		
DIE LINKE	Lorenz Gösta Beutin	Kiel	Schleswig-Holstein	2017	Outlisted		
DIE LINKE	Birke Bull-Bischoff	Burgenland – Saalekreis	Saxony-Anhalt	2017	Outlisted		
DIE LINKE	Heike Hänsel	Tübingen	Baden-Württemberg	2005	Outlisted		
DIE LINKE	Matthias Höhn	Altmark	Saxony-Anhalt	2017	Outlisted		
DIE LINKE	Alexander Neu	Rhein-Sieg-Kreis I	North Rhine-Westphalia	2013	Outlisted		
DIE LINKE	Norbert Müller	Potsdam – Potsdam-Mittelmark II – Teltow-Fläming II	Brandenburg	2014	Outlisted		
DIE LINKE	Tobias Pflüger	Freiburg	Baden-Württemberg	2017	Outlisted		
DIE LINKE	Friedrich Straetmanns	Bielefeld – Gütersloh II	North Rhine-Westphalia	2017	Outlisted		
DIE LINKE	Sabine Zimmermann	Zwickau	Saxony	2005	Outlisted		
DIE LINKE	Evrim Sommer	Berlin-Spandau – Charlottenburg North	Berlin	2017	Outlisted		
CDU/CSU	Maik Beermann	Nienburg II – Schaumburg	Lower Saxony	2017	2017	Marja-Liisa Völlers	SPD
CDU/CSU	Veronika Bellmann	Mittelsachsen	Saxony	2002	1990	Carolin Bachmann	AfD
CDU/CSU	Melanie Bernstein (Note: returned to the Bundestag in 2023, moving up the list after the death of Gero Storjohann)	Plön – Neumünster	Schleswig-Holstein	2017	2009	Kristian Klinck	SPD
CDU/CSU	Christoph Bernstiel	Halle	Saxony-Anhalt	2017	2013	Karamba Diaby	SPD
CDU/CSU	Marie-Luise Dött	Oberhausen – Wesel III	North Rhine-Westphalia	1998	Outlisted		
CDU/CSU	Klaus-Dieter Gröhler	Berlin-Charlottenburg-Wilmersdorf	Berlin	2013	2013	Michael Müller	SPD
CDU/CSU	Ursula Groden-Kranich	Mainz	Rhineland-Palatinate	2013	2009	Daniel Baldy	SPD
CDU/CSU	Frank Heinrich	Chemnitz	Saxony	2009	2009	Detlef Müller	SPD
CDU/CSU	Rudolf Henke	Aachen I	North Rhine-Westphalia	2009	2009	Oliver Krischer	GRÜNE
CDU/CSU	Hans-Jürgen Irmer	Lahn-Dill	Hesse	2017	2009	Dagmar Schmidt	SPD
CDU/CSU	Torbjörn Kartes	Ludwigshafen/Frankenthal	Rhineland-Palatinate	2017	2009	Christian Schreider	SPD
CDU/CSU	Stefan Kaufmann	Stuttgart I	Baden-Württemberg	2009	2005	Cem Özdemir	GRÜNE
CDU/CSU	Rüdiger Kruse	Hamburg-Eimsbüttel	Hamburg	2009	Outlisted		
CDU/CSU	Michael Kuffer	Munich South	Bavaria	2017	2002	Jamila Schäfer	GRÜNE
CDU/CSU	Roy Kühne	Goslar – Northeim – Osterode	Lower Saxony	2017	2017	Frauke Heiligenstadt	SPD
CDU/CSU	Alexander Krauß	Erzgebirgskreis I	Saxony	2017	2009	Thomas Dietz	AfD
CDU/CSU	Saskia Ludwig	Potsdam – Potsdam-Mittelmark II – Teltow-Fläming II	Brandenburg	2019	Outlisted		
CDU/CSU	Gisela Manderla	Cologne III	North Rhine-Westphalia	2013	Outlisted		
CDU/CSU	Astrid Mannes	Darmstadt	Hesse	2017	2017	Andreas Larem	SPD
CDU/CSU	Karsten Möring	Cologne I	North Rhine-Westphalia	2013	2017	Sanae Abdi	SPD
CDU/CSU	Andreas Nick	Montabaur (electoral district)	Rhineland-Palatinate	2013	2002	Tanja Machalet	SPD
CDU/CSU	Sylvia Pantel	Düsseldorf II	North Rhine-Westphalia	2013	2009	Andreas Rimkus	SPD
CDU/CSU	Eckhard Pols	Lüchow-Dannenberg – Lüneburg	Lower Saxony	2009	2009	Jakob Blankenburg	SPD
CDU/CSU	Stefan Sauer	Groß-Gerau	Hesse	2017	2009	Melanie Wegling	SPD
CDU/CSU	Tankred Schipanski	Gotha – Ilm-Kreis	Thuringia	2009	2009	Marcus Bühl	AfD
CDU/CSU	Claudia Schmidtke	Lübeck	Schleswig-Holstein	2017	2017	Tim Klüssendorf	SPD
CDU/CSU	Torsten Schweiger	Mansfeld	Saxony-Anhalt	2017	2013	Robert Farle	AfD
CDU/CSU	Andreas Steier	Trier	Rhineland-Palatinate	2017	2005	Verena Hubertz	SPD
CDU/CSU	Sebastian Steineke	Prignitz – Ostprignitz-Ruppin – Havelland I	Brandenburg	2013	2013	Wiebke Papenbrock	SPD
CDU/CSU	Dietlind Tiemann	Brandenburg an der Havel – Potsdam-Mittelmark I – Havelland III – Teltow-Fläming I	Brandenburg	2017	2017	Sonja Eichwede	SPD
CDU/CSU	Volkmar Vogel	Gera – Greiz – Altenburger Land	Thuringia	2002	2005	Stephan Brandner	AfD
CDU/CSU	Albert Weiler	Saalfeld-Rudolstadt – Saale-Holzland-Kreis – Saale-Orla-Kreis	Thuringia	2017	2009	Michael Kaufmann	AfD
CDU/CSU	Marcus Weinberg	Hamburg-Altona	Hamburg	2005	Outlisted		
CDU/CSU	Ingo Wellenreuther	Karlsruhe City	Baden-Württemberg	2002	2005	Zoe Mayer	GRÜNE
CDU/CSU	Bettina Wiesmann	Frankfurt am Main II	Hesse	2017	2005	Omid Nouripour	GRÜNE
CDU/CSU	Michael von Abercron	Pinneberg	Schleswig-Holstein	2017	2005	Ralf Stegner	SPD
CDU/CSU	Peter Stein	Rostock – Landkreis Rostock II	Mecklenburg-Vorpommern	2013	Outlisted		
SPD	Matthias Bartke	Hamburg-Altona	Hamburg	2013	1990	Linda Heitmann	GRÜNE
SPD	Daniela De Ridder	Mittelems (electoral district)	Lower Saxony	2013	Outlisted		
SPD	Elvan Korkmaz	Gütersloh I	North Rhine-Westphalia	2017	Outlisted		
SPD	Klaus Mindrup	Berlin-Pankow	Berlin	2013	Outlisted		
SPD	Florian Post	Munich North	Bavaria	2013	Outlisted		
SPD	Martin Rabanus	Rheingau-Taunus – Limburg	Hesse	2013	Outlisted		
GRÜNE	Margarete Bause	List only	Bavaria	2017	Outlisted		
GRÜNE	Uwe Kekeritz	Fürth	Bavaria	2009	Outlisted		
GRÜNE	Manuel Sarrazin	Hamburg-Bergedorf – Harburg	Hamburg	2008	Outlisted		
GRÜNE	Charlotte Schneidewind-Hartnagel	Odenwald – Tauber	Baden-Württemberg	2019	Outlisted		
GRÜNE	Margit Stumpp	Aalen – Heidenheim	Baden-Württemberg	2017	Outlisted		
GRÜNE	Gerhard Zickenheiner	Lörrach – Müllheim	Baden-Württemberg	2019	Outlisted		
FDP	Marcel Klinge	Schwarzwald-Baar	Baden-Württemberg	2017	Outlisted		
FDP	Alexander Kulitz	Ulm	Baden-Württemberg	2017	Outlisted		
FDP	Martin Neumann	Elbe-Elster – Oberspreewald-Lausitz II	Brandenburg	2017	Outlisted		
AfD	Martin Hohmann	Fulda	Hesse	2017	Outlisted		
AfD	Jens Maier	Dresden I	Saxony	2017	Outlisted		
AfD	Andreas Mrosek	Dessau – Wittenberg	Saxony-Anhalt	2017	Outlisted		
AfD	Christoph Neumann	Leipzig I	Saxony	2017	Outlisted		
AfD	Frank Pasemann	Magdeburg	Saxony-Anhalt	2017	Outlisted		
Die PARTEI	Marco Bülow (elected as SPD)	Dortmund I	North Rhine-Westphalia	2017	2017	Jens Peick	SPD

== Gallery ==
SPD vote

CDU-CSU vote

Grüne vote

FDP vote

AfD vote

Linke vote
