= Elvan Korkmaz =

German politician (born 1985)

Member of the Bundestag
- In office 2017–2021

Personal details
- Born: 27 July 1985 (age 40) Gütersloh, West Germany (now Germany)
- Party: SPD

Elvan Korkmaz (born 27 July 1985 in Gütersloh) is a German politician of the Social Democratic Party (SPD) who was a member of the Bundestag from the state of North Rhine-Westphalia from 2017 to 2021.

== Political career ==
Korkmaz became a member of the Bundestag in the 2017 German federal election. In parliament, she was a member of the Committee on Transport and Digital Infrastructure and the Digital Agenda Committee.

Korkmaz lost her seat in the 2021 German federal election. In the negotiations to form a so-called traffic light coalition of the SPD, the Green Party and the Free Democrats (FDP) following the 2021 German elections, she was nonetheless part of her party's delegation in the working group on digital innovation and infrastructure, co-chaired by Jens Zimmermann, Malte Spitz and Andreas Pinkwart.

== Life after politics ==
Since 2022, Korkmaz has been working at public affairs agency Gauly in Berlin.

== Other activities ==
- Business Forum of the Social Democratic Party of Germany, Member of the Political Advisory Board (since 2020)
- Federal Network Agency for Electricity, Gas, Telecommunications, Posts and Railway (BNetzA), Alternate Member of the Rail Infrastructure Advisory Council

== Personal life ==
Korkmaz is of ethnic Turkish origin.
