= Jan Plobner =

German politician (born 1992)

Member of the Bundestag
- In office 2021 – March 2025

Personal details
- Born: 26 March 1992 (age 34) Nuremberg
- Party: SPD

Jan Plobner (born 26 March 1992) is a German politician for the SPD and from 2021 to March 2025 member of the Bundestag, the German federal parliament.

== Life and politics ==
Plobner was born 1992 in Nuremberg and studied political science and history, later completing a degree in administrative sciences. In 2021 Plobner was elected to the Bundestag. He is queer speaker of SPD in Bundestag.
