= Christoph Schmid (politician) =

German politician

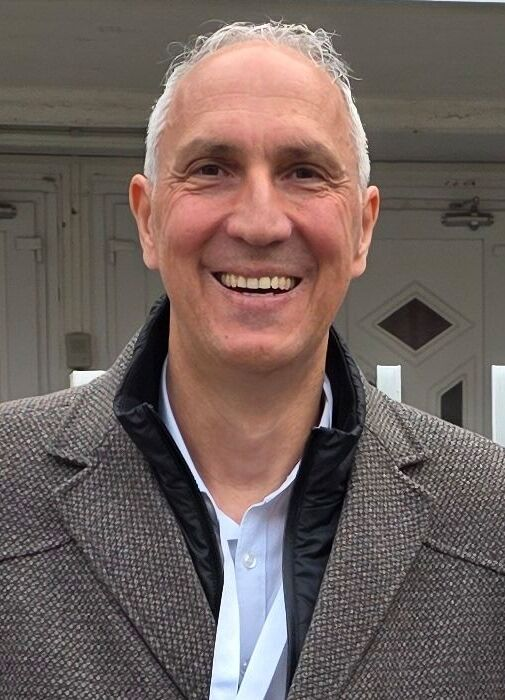

Member of the Bundestag
- Incumbent
- Assumed office 2021

Personal details
- Born: 8 July 1976 (age 50) Munich, Bavaria, West Germany (now Germany)
- Citizenship: German
- Party: SPD
- Education: LMU Munich

Christoph Florian Schmid (born 8 July 1976) is a German politician of the Social Democratic Party (SPD) who has been serving as a member of the Bundestag since 2021, representing the Donau-Ries district.

== Early life and education ==
Schmid was born 1976 in the West German city of Munich and studied political science along with intercultural communication at LMU Munich.

== Political career ==
Schmid was elected to the Bundestag in 2021.

In parliament, Schmid has since been serving on the Defence Committee and the Committee on Economic Cooperation and Development. In addition to his committee assignments, he has been part of the German delegation to the Parliamentary Assembly of the Organization for Security and Co-operation in Europe.

== Other activities ==
- Technical University of Applied Sciences Augsburg, Member of the Board of Trustees
