= Jörg Nürnberger =

German politician

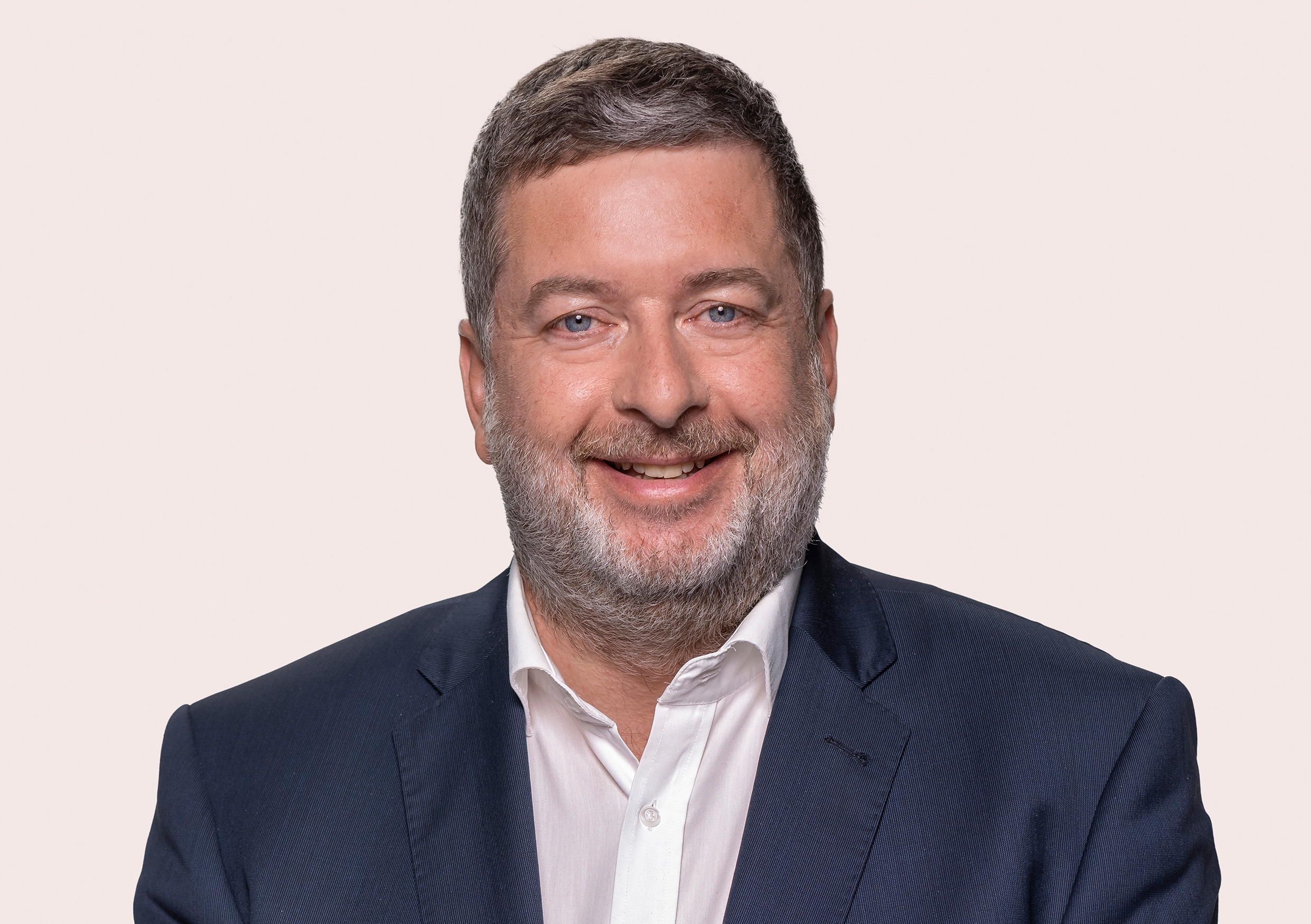

Member of the Bundestag
- Incumbent
- Assumed office 2021

Personal details
- Born: 17 April 1967 (age 59) Wunsiedel, West Germany
- Party: SPD
- Education: University of Bayreuth

Jörg Nürnberger (born 17 April 1967) is a German lawyer and politician of the Social Democratic Party (SPD) who has been serving as a member of the Bundestag since 2021.

== Political career ==
Nürnberger became a member of the Bundestag in the 2021 elections, representing the Hof district. In parliament, he has since been serving on the Defence Committee and the Committee on European Affairs.

In addition to his committee assignments, Nürnberger is part of the Parliamentary Friendship Group for Relations with Slovakia, Czechia and Hungary.
