= Thorsten Rudolph =

German politician (born 1974)

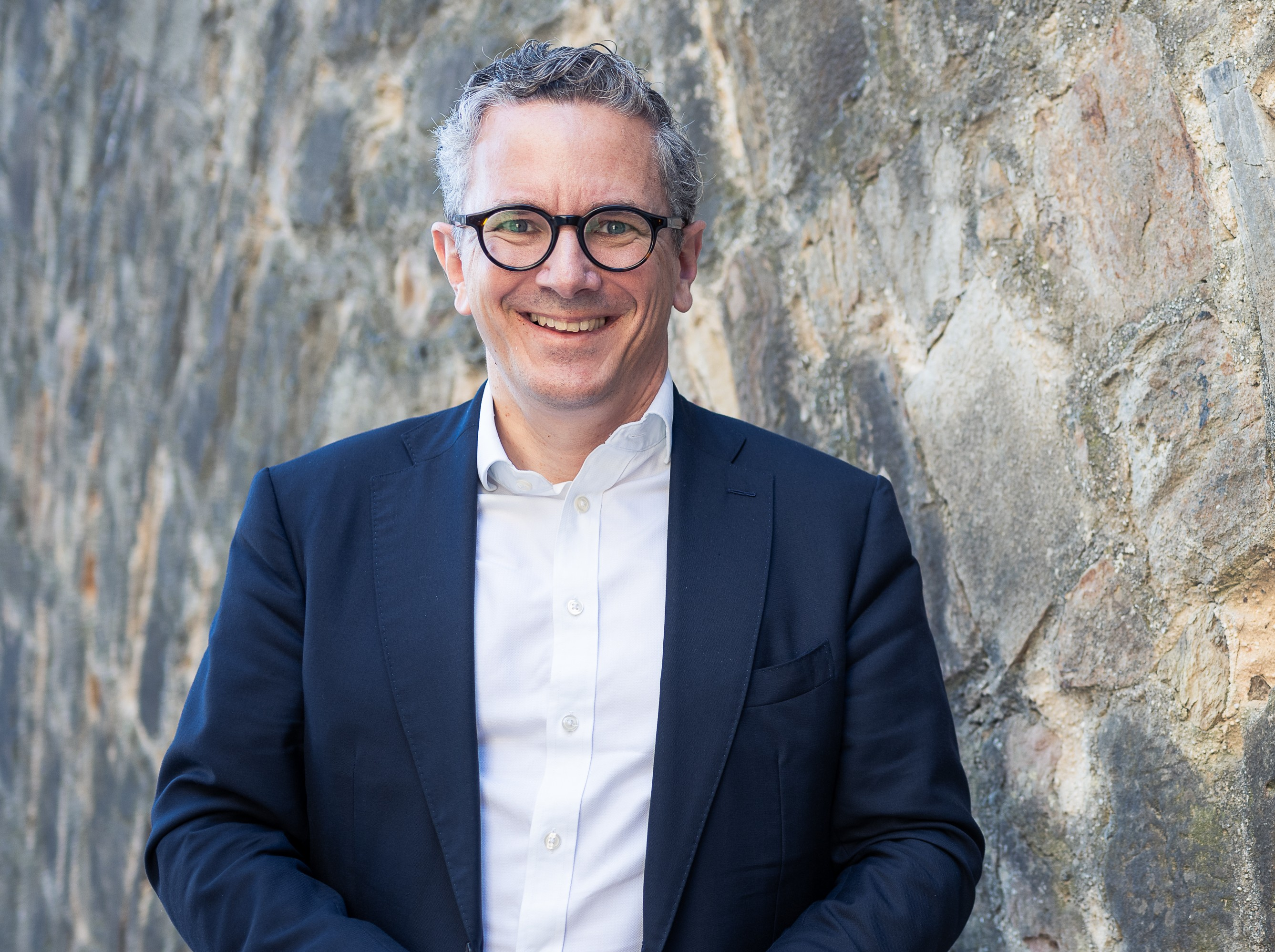
- Rudolph in 2024

Member of the Bundestag
- Incumbent
- Assumed office 2021

Personal details
- Born: 15 March 1974 (age 52) Koblenz, West Germany
- Party: SPD
- Education: University of Bonn

Thorsten Rudolph (born 15 March 1974) is a German politician of the Social Democratic Party (SPD) who has been serving as a member of the Bundestag since 2021.

== Early life and education ==
Rudolph was born 1974 in the West German city of Koblenz and studied law and economics at the University of Bonn.

== Career ==
From 2009 to 2021, Rudolph worked at the State Ministry of Finance and at the State Chancellery of Rhineland-Palatinate.

== Political career ==
Rudolph joined the SPD in 1989.

Rudolph first entered the Bundestag in 2021, representing the Koblenz district. In parliament, he has since been serving on the Budget Committee and its Subcommittee on European Affairs. In 2022, he also joined the parliamentary body charged with overseeing a 100 billion euro special fund to strengthen Germany’s armed forces. Since the 2025 elections, he has been his parliamentary group's spokesperson on the national budget. That same year, he also became a member of the so-called Confidential Committee (Vertrauensgremium) of the Budget Committee, which provides budgetary supervision for Germany's three intelligence services, BND, BfV and MAD.

In addition to his committee assignments, Rudolph has been serving as deputy chair of the German-Indian Parliamentary Friendship Group.

== Other activities ==
- KfW, Member of the Board of Supervisory Directors (since 2024)
- University Medical Center of Johannes Gutenberg University Mainz, Member of the Supervisory Board (2017–2021)
