= Susanne Menge =

German politician (born 1960)

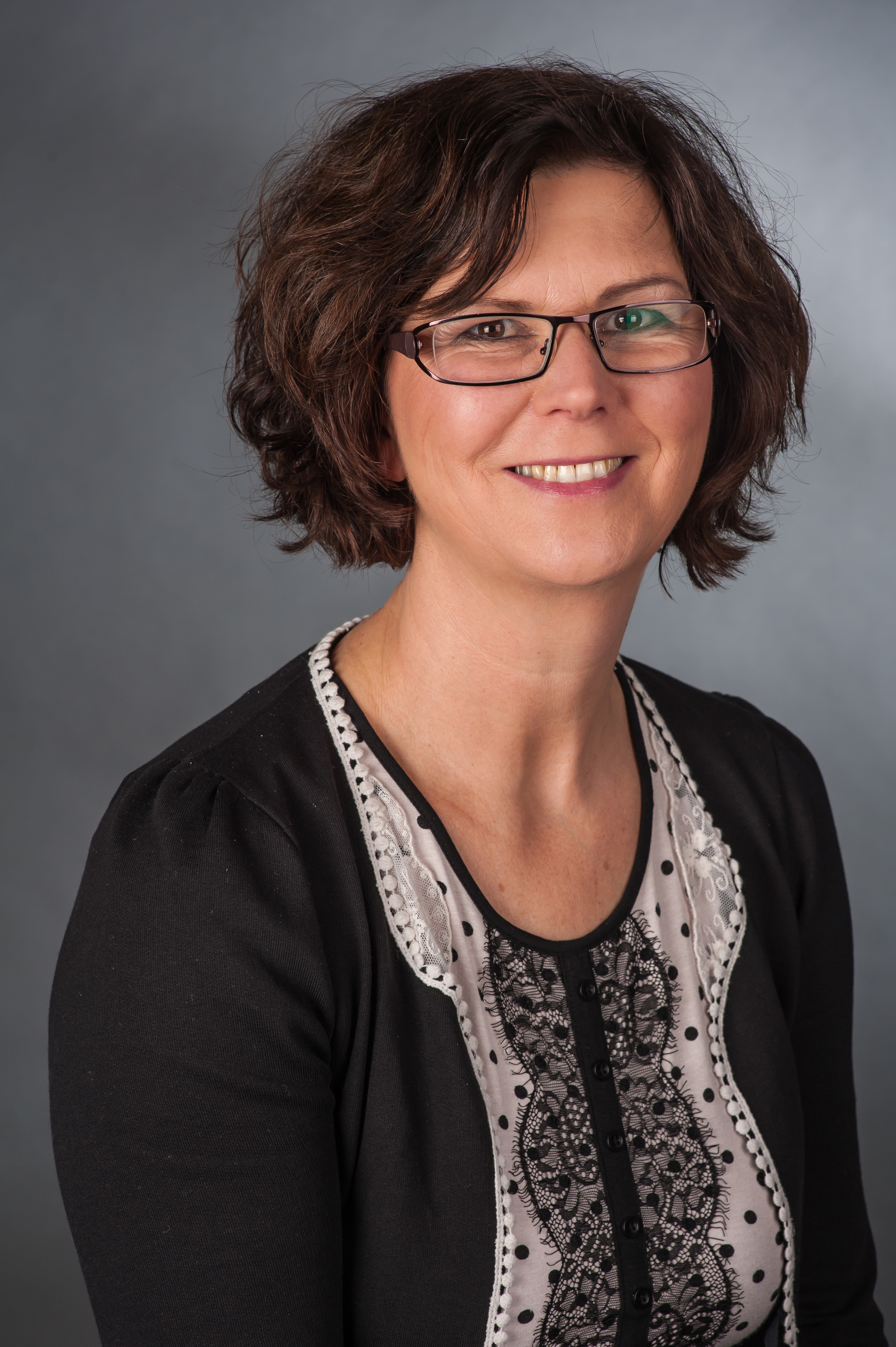
- Menge in 2021

Member of the Bundestag
- Incumbent
- Assumed office 26 October 2021

Personal details
- Born: 11 February 1960 (age 66) Bad Zwischenahn, West Germany
- Party: Alliance 90/The Greens
- Education: University of Oldenburg

Patrizia Susanne Menge (born 11 February 1960) is a German teacher and politician of Alliance 90/The Greens who has been serving as a member of the Bundestag since the 2021 elections.

== Political career ==
From 2013 to 2017 and again from 2019 to 2021, Menge served as a member of the State Parliament of Lower Saxony.

Menge became a member of the Bundestag in the 2021 elections, representing the Oldenburg – Ammerland district. In parliament, she has since been serving on the Committee on Transport and the Committee on Economic Cooperation and Development.

In addition to her committee assignments, Menge is part of the German-Egyptian Parliamentary Friendship Group.

Menge announced in October 2024, that she will not seeking re-election for Bundestag in February 2025.

== Other activities ==
- German Foundation for World Population (DSW), Member of the Parliamentary Advisory Board (since 2022)
