= Anja Troff-Schaffarzyk =

German politician

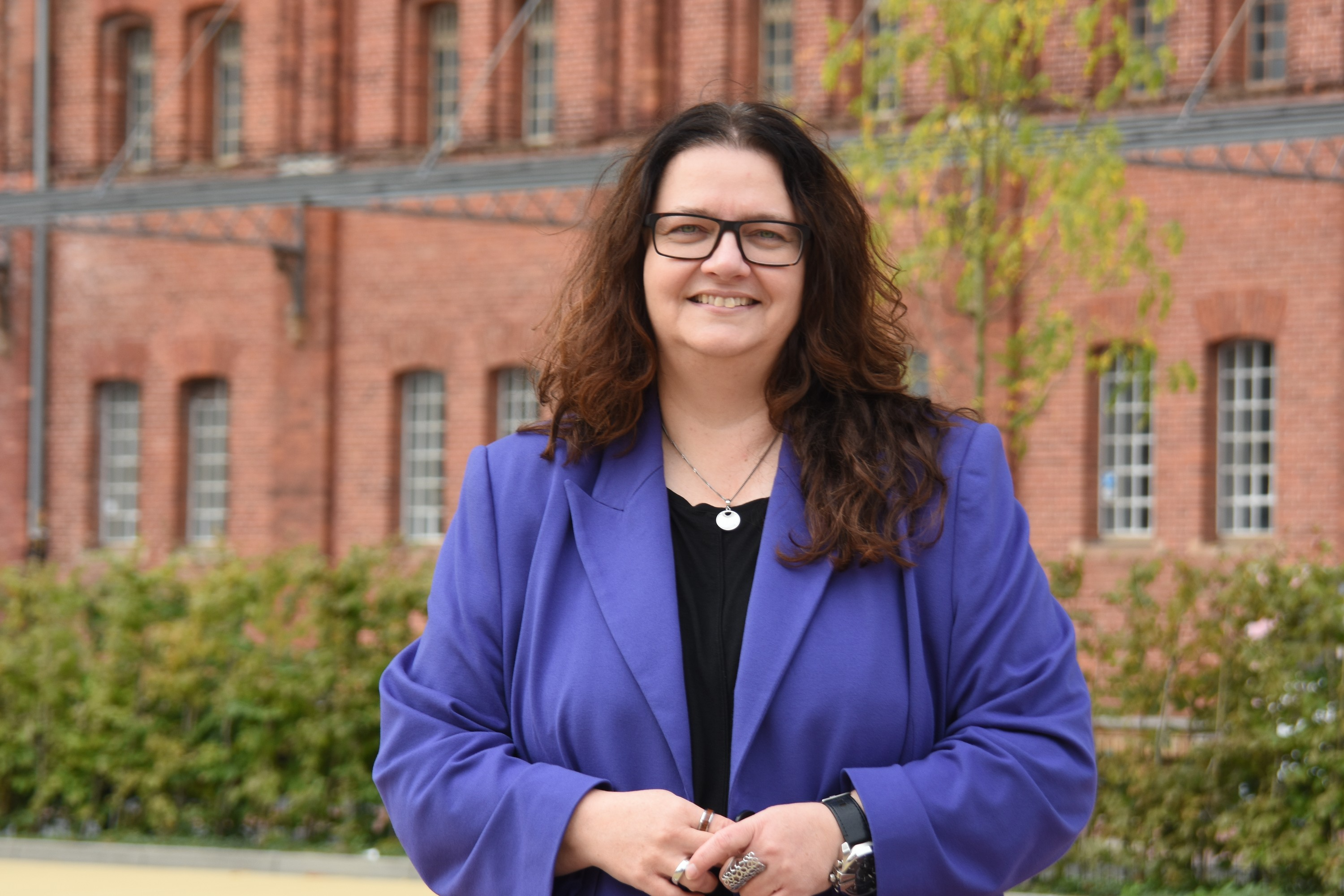
Image of Anja Troff-Schaffarzyk

Anja Troff-Schaffarzyk (born 1 October 1969) is a German politician for the SPD and since 2021 has been a member of the Bundestag, the federal diet.

== Life and politics ==
Troff-Schaffarzyk was born 1969 in the West German municipality of Jemgum. After completing her vocational training as an educator in 1991, she obtained her degree in Educational Sciences (Diplom-Pädagogik) from the Carl von Ossietzky University of Oldenburg in 2003. From 2001 to 2021, she worked at EWE Vertrieb in Oldenburg.

In 2006, she joined the SPD and has been a member of the Uplengen municipal council since 2008. Additionally, she has been a member of the Leer district council since 2011 and has served as its chair since 2016.

Since 2009, she has been active as the treasurer of the SPD district association in Leer and has also served as its chair since 2019. Furthermore, she has been a member of the SPD district board of Weser-Ems since 2019 and was elected to the state board of the SPD Lower Saxony in June 2023.

Her commitment extends to various memberships, including the Workers' Welfare Association, the service union ver.di, and the Social Association of Germany.

She became a member of the Bundestag in 2021.

== Other activities ==
- Federal Network Agency for Electricity, Gas, Telecommunications, Posts and Railway (BNetzA), Member of the Rail Infrastructure Advisory Council (since 2022)
