= Erfurt – Weimar – Weimarer Land II =

Federal electoral district of Germany

192 Erfurt – Weimar – Weimarer Land II
- Electoral district for the Bundestag
- Erfurt – Weimar – Weimarer Land II in 2025
- State: Thuringia
- Population: 285,700 (2019)
- Electorate: 217,944 (2021)
- Major settlements: Erfurt; Weimar
- Area: 442.7 km^{2}

Current electoral district
- Created: 2005
- Party: The Left
- Member: Bodo Ramelow
- Elected: 2025

Erfurt – Weimar – Weimarer Land II is an electoral constituency (German: Wahlkreis) represented in the Bundestag. It elects one member via first-past-the-post voting. Under the current constituency numbering system, it is designated as constituency 192. It is located in central Thuringia, comprising the cities of Erfurt and Weimar as well as the municipality of Grammetal from the Weimarer Land district.

Erfurt – Weimar – Weimarer Land II was created for the 2005 federal election. From 2021 to 2025, it was represented by Carsten Schneider of the Social Democratic Party (SPD). Since 2025 it has been represented by Bodo Ramelow of The Left.

== Geography ==
Erfurt – Weimar – Weimarer Land II is located in central Thuringia. As of the 2021 federal election, it comprises the independent cities of Erfurt and Weimar as well as the municipality of Grammetal from the Weimarer Land district.

== History ==
Erfurt – Weimar – Weimarer Land II was created in 2005 and contained parts of the abolished constituencies of Erfurt and Jena – Weimar – Weimarer Land. In the 2005 election, it was constituency 194 in the numbering system. In the 2009 through 2021 elections, it was number 193. From the 2025 election, it has been number 192. Its borders have not changed since its creation.

== Members ==
The constituency was first represented by Carsten Schneider of the Social Democratic Party (SPD) from 2005 to 2009. Antje Tillmann of the Christian Democratic Union (CDU) was elected in 2009, and re-elected in 2013 and 2017. Former member Schneider regained it for the SPD in 2021.

Election	Member	Party	%
2005	Carsten Schneider	SPD	31.5
2009	Antje Tillmann	CDU	30.8
2013	Antje Tillmann	CDU	37.1
2017	Antje Tillmann	CDU	27.3
2021	Carsten Schneider	SPD	24.4
2025	Bodo Ramelow	LINKE	36.8

== Election results ==
=== 2025 election ===
Federal election (2025): Erfurt – Weimar – Weimarer Land II
Notes:	Blue background denotes the winner of the electorate vote. Pink background denotes a candidate elected from their party list. Yellow background denotes an electorate win by a list member, or other incumbent. A ✓ or ✗ denotes status of any incumbent, win or lose respectively.						
Party	Candidate	Votes	%	±%	Party votes	%	±%
Left	Bodo Ramelow	64,389	36.8	▲20.4	38,667	22.1	▲8.1
AfD	Alexander Claus	46,611	26.7	▲10.1	46,998	26.9	▲10.6
CDU	Michael Hose	28,587	16.3	▼1.0	30,713	17.6	▲3.3
SPD	✗ Carsten Schneider	13,900	7.9	▼16.5	18,408	10.5	▼13.3
BSW	Sebastian Süßmuth	10,296	5.9	New	15,685	9.0	New
Greens	Katrin Göring-Eckardt	5,458	3.1	▼8.7	15,312	8.8	▼4.5
FDP	Thomas Kemmerich	3,350	1.9	▼5.6	5,034	2.9	▼6.5
FW	Frank Ruthmann	1,918	1.1	New	1,760	1.0	▼0.3
Volt					1,594	0.9	▲0.5
BD					395	0.2	New
MLPD	Tassilo Timm	353	0.2	▼0.2	276	0.2	▼0.1
Informal votes		1,169			1,189		
Total valid votes		174,862			174,842		
Turnout		176,031	82.1	▲5.7			
Left gain from SPD	Majority	17,778	10.1	N/A			

=== 2021 election ===
Federal election (2021): Erfurt – Weimar – Weimarer Land II
Notes:	Blue background denotes the winner of the electorate vote. Pink background denotes a candidate elected from their party list. Yellow background denotes an electorate win by a list member, or other incumbent. A ✓ or ✗ denotes status of any incumbent, win or lose respectively.						
Party	Candidate	Votes	%	±%	Party votes	%	±%
SPD	Carsten Schneider	40,185	24.4	▲6.2	39,378	23.9	▲9.7
CDU	✗ Antje Tillmann	28,639	17.4	▼9.9	23,580	14.3	▼11.1
AfD	Sascha Schlösser	27,235	16.5	▼0.9	26,803	16.2	▼1.9
Left	Susanne Hennig-Wellsow	26,972	16.4	▼2.3	23,055	14.0	▼5.4
Greens	Katrin Göring-Eckardt	19,483	11.8	▲4.8	21,831	13.2	▲5.6
FDP	Christian Poloczek-Becher	12,309	7.5	▲1.5	15,504	9.4	▲0.8
PARTEI	Sindy Malsch	4,932	3.0	▲0.8	2,650	1.6	▼0.6
dieBasis	Ulrich Masuth	4,258	2.6		3,048	1.8	
Tierschutzpartei					2,777	1.7	
FW					2,162	1.3	▲0.3
Pirates					1,203	0.7	0.0
Volt					737	0.4	
Team Todenhöfer					465	0.3	
Menschliche Welt					438	0.3	
MLPD	Tassilo Timm	649	0.4		345	0.2	▲0.1
ÖDP					298	0.2	▼0.5
NPD					292	0.2	▼0.5
Humanists					236	0.1	
V-Partei3					196	0.1	▼0.2
Informal votes		1,942			1,606		
Total valid votes		164,652			164,998		
Turnout		166,604	76.4	▲0.6			
SPD gain from CDU	Majority	11,546	7.0				

=== 2017 election ===
Federal election (2017): Erfurt – Weimar – Weimarer Land II
Notes:	Blue background denotes the winner of the electorate vote. Pink background denotes a candidate elected from their party list. Yellow background denotes an electorate win by a list member, or other incumbent. A ✓ or ✗ denotes status of any incumbent, win or lose respectively.						
Party	Candidate	Votes	%	±%	Party votes	%	±%
CDU	✓ Antje Tillmann	45,305	27.3	▼9.8	42,168	25.4	▼9.1
Left	Martina Renner	30,948	18.7	▼4.7	32,239	19.4	▼3.6
SPD	Carsten Schneider	30,257	18.2	▼5.6	23,535	14.2	▼3.5
AfD	Stephan Brandner	28,960	17.5		30,166	18.2	▲12.1
Greens	Katrin Göring-Eckardt	11,722	7.1	▲1.1	12,666	7.6	▼0.9
FDP	Thomas Kemmerich	9,975	6.0	▲4.9	14,260	8.6	▲6.0
PARTEI	Dirk Waldhauer	3,691	2.2		3,715	2.2	
FW	Detlef-Michael Frahm	1,858	1.1	▼0.6	1,598	1.0	▼0.3
Pirates	Peter Städter	1,668	1.0	▼2.7	1,143	0.7	▼2.5
NPD					1,129	0.7	▼1.6
ÖDP	Thomas Hanf	1,541	0.9		1,084	0.7	0.0
BGE					951	0.6	
DM					663	0.4	
V-Partei³					601	0.4	
MLPD					240	0.1	0.0
Informal votes		2,310			2,077		
Total valid votes		165,925			166,158		
Turnout		168,235	75.8	▲6.0			
CDU hold	Majority	14,357	8.6	▼4.6			

=== 2013 election ===
Federal election (2013): Erfurt – Weimar – Weimarer Land II
Notes:	Blue background denotes the winner of the electorate vote. Pink background denotes a candidate elected from their party list. Yellow background denotes an electorate win by a list member, or other incumbent. A ✓ or ✗ denotes status of any incumbent, win or lose respectively.						
Party	Candidate	Votes	%	±%	Party votes	%	±%
CDU	✓ Antje Tillmann	56,992	37.1	▲6.3	53,123	34.5	▲6.5
SPD	Carsten Schneider	36,694	23.9	▲1.4	27,159	17.6	▼0.4
Left	Karola Stange	35,917	23.4	▼5.5	35,421	23.0	▼5.0
Greens	Dieter Lauinger	9,151	6.0	▼2.2	13,125	8.5	▼1.9
AfD					9,328	6.1	
Pirates	Manfred Schubert	5,670	3.7		4,849	3.1	▼0.2
NPD	Jan Morgenroth	4,774	3.1	▲0.3	3,554	2.3	▼0.2
FW	Helmut Besser	2,699	1.8		2,012	1.3	
FDP	Florian Andreas Hartjen	1,781	1.2	▼4.8	4,015	2.6	▼6.4
ÖDP					1,005	0.7	▲0.3
REP					267	0.2	▼0.1
MLPD					248	0.2	0.0
Informal votes		2,689			2,261		
Total valid votes		153,678			154,106		
Turnout		156,367	69.8	▲2.8			
CDU hold	Majority	20,298	13.2	▲11.3			

=== 2009 election ===
Federal election (2009): Erfurt – Weimar – Weimarer Land II
Notes:	Blue background denotes the winner of the electorate vote. Pink background denotes a candidate elected from their party list. Yellow background denotes an electorate win by a list member, or other incumbent. A ✓ or ✗ denotes status of any incumbent, win or lose respectively.						
Party	Candidate	Votes	%	±%	Party votes	%	±%
CDU	Antje Tillmann	45,931	30.8	▲3.2	41,777	27.9	▲5.3
Left	Frank Spieth	43,050	28.8	▲2.6	41,801	27.9	▲2.1
SPD	✗ Carsten Schneider	33,488	22.4	▼9.1	26,897	18.0	▼12.9
Greens	Dieter Lauinger	12,137	8.1	▲0.6	15,630	10.4	▲2.3
FDP	Stefan Feuerstein	8,897	6.0	▲1.9	13,429	9.0	▲1.4
Pirates					4,958	3.3	
NPD	Frank Schwerdt	4,151	2.8	▼0.3	3,762	2.5	0.0
Independent	Matthias Fimmel	947	0.6				
Independent	Dieter Schumann	673	0.5				
ÖDP					600	0.4	
REP					451	0.3	▼0.4
MLPD					293	0.2	▼0.1
Informal votes		1,962			1,638		
Total valid votes		149,274			149,598		
Turnout		151,236	67.0	▼8.8			
CDU gain from SPD	Majority	2,881	2.0				

=== 2005 election ===
Federal election (2005):Erfurt - Weimar - Weimarer Land II
Notes:	Blue background denotes the winner of the electorate vote. Pink background denotes a candidate elected from their party list. Yellow background denotes an electorate win by a list member, or other incumbent. A ✓ or ✗ denotes status of any incumbent, win or lose respectively.						
Party	Candidate	Votes	%	±%	Party votes	%	±%
SPD	Carsten Schneider	52,304	31.5	▼10.7	51,375	30.8	▼9.6
CDU	Antje Tillmann	45,728	27.5	▲0.2	37,749	22.7	▼2.0
Left	Frank Spieth	43,520	26.2	▲6.5	43,048	25.8	▲7.5
Greens	Katrin Göring-Eckardt	12,553	7.6	▲2.2	13,638	8.2	▲0.6
FDP	Patrick Kurth	6,801	4.1	▼0.8	12,638	7.6	▲2.1
NPD	Walter Beck	5,145	3.1		4,235	2.5	▲2.0
GRAUEN					2,080	1.2	▲0.7
REP					1,241	0.7	▼0.1
MLPD					536	0.3	
Informal votes		3,221			2,732		
Total valid votes		166,051			166,540		
Turnout		169,272	75.8	▲0.5			
SPD hold	Majority	6,576	4				
