= Schüttler =

Schüttler is a German surname. Notable people with the surname include:

- Josef Schüttler (1902–1972), German politician
- Katharina Schüttler (born 1979), German actress
- Rainer Schüttler (born 1976), German tennis player
