= Erfurt I =

Electoral constituency in Landtag of Thuringia

Erfurt I is an electoral constituency (German: Wahlkreis) represented in the Landtag of Thuringia. It elects one member via first-past-the-post voting. Under the current constituency numbering system, it is designated as constituency 24. It contains northern parts of Erfurt, the capital and largest city of Thuringia.

Erfurt I was created in 1990 for the first state election. Since 2024, it has been represented by Sascha Schlösser of Alternative for Germany.

== Geography ==
As of the 2019 state election, Erfurt I is located entirely within the urban district of Erfurt. It covers the northern part of the city, specifically the city districts (Stadtteile) of Alach, Azmannsdorf, Gispersleben, Hochstedt, Hohenwinden, Kerspleben, Kühnhausen, Linderbach, Mittelhausen, Moskauer Platz, Rieth, Roter Berg, Schaderode, Schwerborn, Stotternheim, Sulzer Siedlung, Tiefthal, Töttelstädt, Töttleben, Vieselbach, and Wallichen.

== Members ==
The constituency was held by the Christian Democratic Union (CDU) from its creation in 1990 until 2004, during which time it was represented by Johanna Arenhövel. It was won by the Party of Democratic Socialism (PDS) in 2004, and represented by then-state leader Bodo Ramelow. In 2009, Ramelow instead ran in Erfurt III, and Erfurt I was won by Karola Stange of The Left, successor party of the PDS. She was re-elected in 2014 and 2019. In 2024, Sascha Schlösser of Alternative for Germany won the seat.

Election	Member	Party	%
1990	Johanna Arenhövel	CDU	37.2
1994	Johanna Arenhövel	CDU	38.2
1999	Johanna Arenhövel	CDU	46.8
2004	Bodo Ramelow	PDS	38.6
2009	Karola Stange	LINKE	30.2
2014	Karola Stange	LINKE	36.8
2019	Karola Stange	LINKE	28.9
2024	Sascha Schlösser	AfD	35.7

== Election results ==
=== 2024 election ===
State election (2024): Erfurt I
Notes:	Blue background denotes the winner of the electorate vote. Pink background denotes a candidate elected from their party list. Yellow background denotes an electorate win by a list member, or other incumbent. A ✓ or ✗ denotes status of any incumbent, win or lose respectively.						
Party	Candidate	Votes	%	±%	Party votes	%	±%
AfD	Sascha Schlösser	8,074	35.7	▲11.3	7,137	31.2	▲7.1
CDU	Michael Hose	7,629	33.7	▲9.6	5,143	22.5	▲3.5
BSW					3,930	17.2	
Left	✗ Karola Stange	4,450	19.7	▼9.2	3,407	14.9	▼19.2
SPD	Torsten Frenzel	1,466	6.5	▼5.6	1,421	6.2	▼1.9
FDP	Christian Poloczek-Becher	604	2.7	▼1.5	297	1.3	▼3.6
Greens	Doreen Denstädt	396	1.8	▼2.3	582	2.5	▼1.7
APT					292	1.3	▲0.1
FW					166	0.7	
Familie					117	0.5	
BD					114	0.5	
Values					94	0.4	
Pirates					89	0.4	▼0.1
ÖDP					52	0.2	▼0.2
MLPD					49	0.2	▼0.1
Informal votes		481			210		
Total valid votes		22,619			22,890		
Turnout		23,100	71.7	▲8.0			
AfD gain from Left	Majority	445	2.0				

=== 2019 election ===
State election (2019): Erfurt I
Notes:	Blue background denotes the winner of the electorate vote. Pink background denotes a candidate elected from their party list. Yellow background denotes an electorate win by a list member, or other incumbent. A ✓ or ✗ denotes status of any incumbent, win or lose respectively.						
Party	Candidate	Votes	%	±%	Party votes	%	±%
Left	✓ Karola Stange	5,871	28.9	▼7.9	6,950	34.1	▼0.1
AfD	Corinna Herold	4,974	24.4		4,914	24.1	▲13.4
CDU	Michael Hose	4,909	24.1	▼5.1	3,877	19.0	▼7.6
SPD	Haß Torsten	2,460	12.1	▼9.6	1,658	8.1	▼6.1
FDP	Christian Poloczek-Becher	868	4.3	▲1.5	991	4.9	▲2.6
Greens	Michael Host	838	4.1	▼0.6	858	4.2	▼0.6
Free Voters	Oliver Jahn	357	1.8				
MLPD	Ibrahim Kücük	68	0.3		57	0.3	
List-only parties					1,105	5.4	
Informal votes		315			250		
Total valid votes		20,345			20,410		
Turnout		20,660	63.7	▲12.8			
Left hold	Majority	897	4.5	▼3.1			

=== 2014 election ===
State election (2014): Erfurt I
Notes:	Blue background denotes the winner of the electorate vote. Pink background denotes a candidate elected from their party list. Yellow background denotes an electorate win by a list member, or other incumbent. A ✓ or ✗ denotes status of any incumbent, win or lose respectively.						
Party	Candidate	Votes	%	±%	Party votes	%	±%
Left	✓ Karola Stange	5,909	36.8	▲6.6	5,556	34.2	▲3.1
CDU	Johanna Arenhövel	4,691	29.2	▲0.1	4,328	26.6	0.0
SPD	Haß Torsten	3,483	21.7	▲2.1	2,351	14.5	▼5.3
AfD					1,732	10.7	
NPD	Patrick Borkowski	784	4.9	▲0.4	568	3.5	▼1.1
Greens	Robert Bednarsky	753	4.7	▼0.7	781	4.8	▼1.0
FDP	Christian Poloczek-Becher	445	2.8	▼2.9	373	2.3	▼4.3
List-only parties					560	3.4	
Informal votes		432			248		
Total valid votes		16,065			16,249		
Turnout		16,497	50.9	▼4.6			
Left hold	Majority	1,218	7.6	▲6.5			

=== 2009 election ===
State election (2009): Erfurt I
Notes:	Blue background denotes the winner of the electorate vote. Pink background denotes a candidate elected from their party list. Yellow background denotes an electorate win by a list member, or other incumbent. A ✓ or ✗ denotes status of any incumbent, win or lose respectively.						
Party	Candidate	Votes	%	±%	Party votes	%	±%
Left	Karola Stange	5,519	30.2	▼8.4	5,701	31.1	▼1.7
CDU	Tabia Gies	5,324	29.1	▼7.7	4,872	26.6	▼10.9
SPD	Birgit Pelke	3,594	19.6	▲3.7	3,637	19.8	▲5.3
FDP	Jürgen Listemann	1,050	5.7	▲1.2	1,213	6.6	▲3.0
FW	Helmut Besser	1,001	5.5		858	4.7	▲4.0
Greens	Kathrin Hoyer	982	5.4	▲1.2	1,064	5.8	▲1.4
NPD	Andreas Udhardt	830	4.5		839	4.6	▲3.6
List-only parties					162	0.9	
Informal votes		469			423		
Total valid votes		18,300			18,346		
Turnout		18,769	55.5	▲6.3			
Left hold	Majority	195	1.1	▼0.7			

=== 2004 election ===
State election (2004): Erfurt I
Notes:	Blue background denotes the winner of the electorate vote. Pink background denotes a candidate elected from their party list. Yellow background denotes an electorate win by a list member, or other incumbent. A ✓ or ✗ denotes status of any incumbent, win or lose respectively.						
Party	Candidate	Votes	%	±%	Party votes	%	±%
PDS	Bodo Ramelow	6,398	38.6	▲11.8	5,519	32.8	▲7.1
CDU	✗ Johanna Arenhövel	6,108	36.8	▼10.0	6,318	37.5	▼11.6
SPD	Birgit Pelke	2,629	15.9	▼4.8	2,440	14.5	▼3.3
FDP	Sven Meth	754	4.5	▲3.2	610	3.6	▲2.9
Greens	Dirk Adams	690	4.2	▲1.8	732	4.4	▲2.7
List-only parties					1,208	7.2	
Informal votes		1,017			769		
Total valid votes		16,579			16,827		
Turnout		17,596	49.2	▼9.6			
PDS gain from CDU	Majority	290	1.8				

=== 1999 election ===
State election (1999): Erfurt I
Notes:	Blue background denotes the winner of the electorate vote. Pink background denotes a candidate elected from their party list. Yellow background denotes an electorate win by a list member, or other incumbent. A ✓ or ✗ denotes status of any incumbent, win or lose respectively.						
Party	Candidate	Votes	%	±%	Party votes	%	±%
CDU	✓ Johanna Arenhövel	10,442	46.8	▲8.6	11,025	49.1	▲12.2
PDS		5,988	26.8	▲3.6	5,789	25.7	▲3.2
SPD		4,610	20.7	▼10.2	4,001	17.8	▼12.0
Greens		537	2.4	▼5.3	378	1.7	▼2.8
REP		434	1.9		132	0.6	▼0.3
FDP		300	1.3		166	0.7	▼1.5
List-only parties					994	4.4	
Informal votes		449			275		
Total valid votes		22,311			22,485		
Turnout		22,760	58.7	▼14.6			
CDU hold	Majority	4,454	20.0	▲12.7			

=== 1994 election ===
State election (1994): Erfurt I
Notes:	Blue background denotes the winner of the electorate vote. Pink background denotes a candidate elected from their party list. Yellow background denotes an electorate win by a list member, or other incumbent. A ✓ or ✗ denotes status of any incumbent, win or lose respectively.						
Party	Candidate	Votes	%	±%	Party votes	%	±%
CDU	✓ Johanna Arenhövel	11,306	38.2	▲1.0	11,016	36.9	▼0.9
SPD		9,132	30.9	▲9.1	8,890	29.8	▲5.7
PDS		6,854	23.2	▲6.5	6,725	22.5	▲6.1
Greens		2,288	7.7	▼1.5	1,349	4.5	▼4.3
List-only parties					1,880	6.3	
Informal votes		977			697		
Total valid votes		29,580			29,860		
Turnout		30,557	73.3	▲5.1			
CDU hold	Majority	2,174	7.3	▼8.1			

=== 1990 election ===
State election (1990): Erfurt I
Notes:	Blue background denotes the winner of the electorate vote. Pink background denotes a candidate elected from their party list. Yellow background denotes an electorate win by a list member, or other incumbent. A ✓ or ✗ denotes status of any incumbent, win or lose respectively.						
Party	Candidate	Votes	%	±%	Party votes	%	±%
CDU	Johanna Arenhövel	9,714	37.2		9,978	37.8	
SPD		5,692	21.8		6,346	24.1	
PDS		4,355	16.7		4,318	16.4	
Greens		2,404	9.2		2,312	8.8	
FDP		2,084	8.0		2,221	8.4	
DSU		1,421	5.4		596	2.3	
UFV		409	1.6		182	0.7	
List-only parties					412	1.6	
Informal votes		894			608		
Total valid votes		26,079			26,365		
Turnout		26,973	68.2				
CDU win new seat	Majority	4,022	15.4				
