= Konstanz (Bundestag electoral district) =

Federal electoral district of Germany

287 Konstanz
- Electoral district for the Bundestag
- Konstanz in 2025
- State: Baden-Württemberg
- Population: 286,300 (2019)
- Electorate: 206,009 (2021)
- Major settlements: Konstanz; Singen; Radolfzell
- Area: 818.0 km^{2}

Current electoral district
- Created: 1949
- Party: CDU
- Member: Vacant

Konstanz is an electoral constituency (German: Wahlkreis) represented in the Bundestag. It elects one member via first-past-the-post voting. Under the current constituency numbering system, it is designated as constituency 287. It is located in southern Baden-Württemberg, comprising the district of Konstanz.

Konstanz was created for the inaugural 1949 federal election. From 2005 to 2026, it was represented by Andreas Jung of the Christian Democratic Union (CDU).

== Geography ==
Konstanz is located in southern Baden-Württemberg. As of the 2021 federal election, it is coterminous with the district of Konstanz.

== History ==
Konstanz was created in 1949. In the 1949 election, it was Baden constituency 1 in the numbering system. In the 1953 through 1961 elections, it was number 183. In the 1965 through 1976 elections, it was number 186. In the 1980 through 1998 elections, it was number 191. In the 2002 and 2005 elections, it was number 288. Since the 2009 election, it has been number 287.

Originally, the constituency comprised the independent city of Konstanz and the districts of Landkreis Konstanz and Überlingen. In the 1965 through 1976 elections, it comprised the districts of Konstanz and the Überlingen district excluding the municipalities of Adelsreute and Wangen.

Election	No.	Name	Borders
1949	1	Konstanz	Konstanz city; Landkreis Konstanz district; Überlingen district
1953	183	Konstanz	Konstanz city; Landkreis Konstanz district; Überlingen district
1957	183	Konstanz	Konstanz city; Landkreis Konstanz district; Überlingen district
1961	183	Konstanz	Konstanz city; Landkreis Konstanz district; Überlingen district
1965	186	Konstanz	Konstanz district; Überlingen district (excluding Adelsreute and Wangen municipalities)
1969	186	Konstanz	Konstanz district; Überlingen district (excluding Adelsreute and Wangen municipalities)
1972	186	Konstanz	Konstanz district; Überlingen district (excluding Adelsreute and Wangen municipalities)
1976	186	Konstanz	Konstanz district; Überlingen district (excluding Adelsreute and Wangen municipalities)
1980	191	Konstanz	Konstanz district
1983	191	Konstanz	Konstanz district
1987	191	Konstanz	Konstanz district
1990	191	Konstanz	Konstanz district
1994	191	Konstanz	Konstanz district
1998	191	Konstanz	Konstanz district
2002	288	Konstanz	Konstanz district
2005	288	Konstanz	Konstanz district
2009	287	Konstanz	Konstanz district
2013	287	Konstanz	Konstanz district
2017	287	Konstanz	Konstanz district
2021	287	Konstanz	Konstanz district
2025	287	Konstanz	Konstanz district

== Members ==
The constituency has been held continuously by Christian Democratic Union (CDU) since its creation. It was first represented by Josef Schüttler from 1949 to 1961, followed by Hermann Biechele from 1961 to 1980. Hans-Peter Repnik was representative from 1980 to 2005, a total of seven consecutive terms. Andreas Jung was representative from 2005 to 2026.

Election	Member	Party	%
1949	Josef Schüttler	CDU	50.5
1953	Josef Schüttler	CDU	63.8
1957	Josef Schüttler	CDU	61.5
1961	Hermann Biechele	CDU	53.1
1965	Hermann Biechele	CDU	55.3
1969	Hermann Biechele	CDU	51.1
1972	Hermann Biechele	CDU	52.0
1976	Hermann Biechele	CDU	55.4
1980	Hans-Peter Repnik	CDU	52.8
1983	Hans-Peter Repnik	CDU	60.7
1987	Hans-Peter Repnik	CDU	54.2
1990	Hans-Peter Repnik	CDU	53.5
1994	Hans-Peter Repnik	CDU	52.1
1998	Hans-Peter Repnik	CDU	44.2
2002	Hans-Peter Repnik	CDU	44.1
2005	Andreas Jung	CDU	43.9
2009	Andreas Jung	CDU	43.1
2013	Andreas Jung	CDU	51.9
2017	Andreas Jung	CDU	44.8
2021	Andreas Jung	CDU	34.1
2025	Andreas Jung	CDU	37.7
2026	Vacant		

== Election results ==
=== 2025 election ===
Federal election (2025): Konstanz
Notes:	Blue background denotes the winner of the electorate vote. Pink background denotes a candidate elected from their party list. Yellow background denotes an electorate win by a list member, or other incumbent. A ✓ or ✗ denotes status of any incumbent, win or lose respectively.						
Party	Candidate	Votes	%	±%	Party votes	%	±%
CDU	✓ Andreas Jung	63,922	37.7	▲3.6	51,150	30.1	▲6.9
AfD	Bernhard Eisenhut	29,584	17.4	▲8.8	31,134	18.3	▲9.8
SPD	Lina Seitzl	26,451	15.6	▼4.5	22,599	13.3	▼7.6
Greens	Rosa Buß	25,390	15.0	▼3.0	28,614	16.8	▼4.2
Left	Lars Hofmann	9,987	5.9	▲2.3	12,660	7.4	▲3.7
FDP	Ann-Veruschka Jurisch	7,363	4.3	▼6.6	9,833	5.8	▼9.2
FW	Wilhelm-Ulrich Sander	3,341	2.0	▲0.2	1,929	1.1	▼0.3
Volt	Sebastian Knau	2,911	1.7		1,691	1.0	▲0.6
Independent	Thorsten Otterbach	622	0.4				
BSW					6,933	4.1	
Tierschutzpartei					1,349	0.8	▲0.4
PARTEI				▼0.8	872	0.5	▼0.5
dieBasis					466	0.3	▼1.7
ÖDP				▼0.6	301	0.2	▼0.1
Bündnis C					219	0.1	0.0
BD					148	0.1	
MLPD					48	0.0	0.0
Pirates							▼0.3
Team Todenhöfer							▼0.3
Humanists							▼0.1
Gesundheitsforschung							▼0.1
Informal votes		1,169			794		
Total valid votes		169,571			169,946		
Turnout		170,740	82.4	▲6.0			
CDU hold	Majority	34,068	20.3	▼5.2			

=== 2021 election ===
Federal election (2021): Konstanz
Notes:	Blue background denotes the winner of the electorate vote. Pink background denotes a candidate elected from their party list. Yellow background denotes an electorate win by a list member, or other incumbent. A ✓ or ✗ denotes status of any incumbent, win or lose respectively.						
Party	Candidate	Votes	%	±%	Party votes	%	±%
CDU	✓ Andreas Jung	53,362	34.1	▼10.6	36,209	23.2	▼10.0
SPD	Lina Seitzl	31,486	20.1	▲3.3	32,657	20.9	▲5.3
Greens	Sebastian Lederer	28,142	18.0	▲4.6	32,913	21.0	▲5.0
FDP	Ann-Veruschka Jurisch	17,047	10.9	▲3.6	23,509	15.0	▲1.8
AfD	Michael Hug	13,487	8.6	▼0.9	13,341	8.5	▼1.8
Left	Sibylle Röth	5,591	3.6	▼3.4	5,804	3.7	▼3.5
dieBasis					3,022	1.9	
PARTEI	Björn Langer	2,838	1.8	▲0.8	1,643	1.1	▲0.2
FW	Gordon Nothig	2,809	1.8		2,204	1.4	▲0.8
Tierschutzpartei					1,928	1.2	▲0.3
Volt					570	0.4	
Pirates					546	0.3	▼0.1
ÖDP	Franz Weber	945	0.6		463	0.3	0.0
Team Todenhöfer					401	0.3	
Independent	Helmut Ringger	339	0.2				
Bündnis C					221	0.1	
Bürgerbewegung					167	0.1	
Humanists					164	0.1	
NPD					141	0.1	▼0.1
Gesundheitsforschung					141	0.1	
DiB					140	0.1	▼0.1
LKR	Michael Streitberger	180	0.1		103	0.1	
Independent	Matthias Harting	60	0.0				
Bündnis 21					45	0.0	
DKP					35	0.0	0.0
MLPD					33	0.0	0.0
Informal votes		1,277			1,163		
Total valid votes		156,286			156,400		
Turnout		157,563	76.5	▼1.0			
CDU hold	Majority	21,876	14.0	▼13.9			

=== 2017 election ===
Federal election (2017): Konstanz
Notes:	Blue background denotes the winner of the electorate vote. Pink background denotes a candidate elected from their party list. Yellow background denotes an electorate win by a list member, or other incumbent. A ✓ or ✗ denotes status of any incumbent, win or lose respectively.						
Party	Candidate	Votes	%	±%	Party votes	%	±%
CDU	✓ Andreas Jung	70,355	44.8	▼7.1	52,194	33.2	▼10.4
SPD	Tobias Volz	26,396	16.8	▼2.4	24,529	15.6	▼4.6
Greens	Martin Schmeding	21,052	13.4	▲0.1	25,202	16.0	▲3.4
AfD	Walter Schwäbsch	15,006	9.6	▲5.5	16,215	10.3	▲4.8
FDP	Tassilo Richter	11,425	7.3	▲3.5	20,758	13.2	▲5.8
Left	Simon Pschorr	11,003	7.0	▲2.9	11,306	7.2	▲2.2
Tierschutzpartei					1,473	0.9	▲0.1
PARTEI	Armin Kabis	1,552	1.0		1,354	0.9	
FW					988	0.6	▲0.2
Pirates					639	0.4	▼1.8
ÖDP					456	0.3	▼0.2
BGE					374	0.2	
DM					357	0.2	
Tierschutzallianz					346	0.2	
NPD					337	0.2	▼0.6
Independent	Helmut Ringger	320	0.2				
DiB					303	0.2	
V-Partei³					212	0.1	
Menschliche Welt					194	0.1	
MLPD					82	0.1	0.0
DIE RECHTE					39	0.0	
DKP					25	0.0	
Informal votes		1,752			1,478		
Total valid votes		157,109			157,383		
Turnout		158,861	77.4	▲4.5			
CDU hold	Majority	43,959	28.0	▼4.7			

=== 2013 election ===
Federal election (2013): Konstanz
Notes:	Blue background denotes the winner of the electorate vote. Pink background denotes a candidate elected from their party list. Yellow background denotes an electorate win by a list member, or other incumbent. A ✓ or ✗ denotes status of any incumbent, win or lose respectively.						
Party	Candidate	Votes	%	±%	Party votes	%	±%
CDU	✓ Andreas Jung	75,524	51.9	▲8.7	63,563	43.6	▲11.7
SPD	Tobias Volz	27,956	19.2	▼2.4	29,504	20.2	▲1.3
Greens	Nese Erikli	19,322	13.3	▲0.6	18,446	12.7	▼2.2
Left	Marco Radojevic	5,980	4.1	▼2.4	7,295	5.0	▼1.8
AfD	Timo Sturn	5,852	4.0		8,027	5.5	
FDP	Birgit Homburger	5,476	3.8	▼11.0	10,735	7.4	▼14.0
Pirates	Andreas Bergholz	3,198	2.2		3,190	2.2	▼0.2
Tierschutzpartei					1,180	0.8	▼0.1
NPD	Susanne Hoffmann	1,237	0.8	▼0.4	1,116	0.8	▼0.2
ÖDP	Christoph Merk	1,105	0.8		661	0.5	▲0.1
FW					649	0.4	
Volksabstimmung					384	0.3	▼0.1
RENTNER					335	0.2	
PBC					230	0.2	▼0.1
REP					199	0.1	▼0.3
Party of Reason					101	0.1	
PRO					89	0.1	
BIG					49	0.0	
MLPD					43	0.0	0.0
BüSo					20	0.0	0.0
Informal votes		1,907			1,741		
Total valid votes		145,650			145,816		
Turnout		147,557	72.9	▲2.0			
CDU hold	Majority	47,568	32.7	▲11.2			

=== 2009 election ===
Federal election (2009): Konstanz
Notes:	Blue background denotes the winner of the electorate vote. Pink background denotes a candidate elected from their party list. Yellow background denotes an electorate win by a list member, or other incumbent. A ✓ or ✗ denotes status of any incumbent, win or lose respectively.						
Party	Candidate	Votes	%	±%	Party votes	%	±%
CDU	✓ Andreas Jung	59,256	43.1	▼0.7	43,844	31.8	▼5.5
SPD	Peter Friedrich	29,713	21.6	▼10.0	26,047	18.9	▼10.9
FDP	Birgit Homburger	20,335	14.8	▲4.3	29,372	21.3	▲7.6
Greens	Till Seiler (Note: Seiler entered the Bundestag on the Greens list after the resignation of Winfried Hermann in June 2011.)	17,439	12.7	▲3.8	20,482	14.9	▲2.8
Left	Franziska Stier	8,943	6.5	▲2.8	9,344	6.8	▲3.0
Pirates					3,298	2.4	
Tierschutzpartei					1,319	1.0	
NPD	Klaus Louis	1,688	1.2	▼0.2	1,309	1.0	▼0.1
REP					533	0.4	▼0.2
Volksabstimmung					490	0.4	
ÖDP					465	0.3	
DIE VIOLETTEN					444	0.3	
PBC					419	0.3	▼0.1
ADM					116	0.1	
DVU					83	0.1	
MLPD					62	0.0	0.0
BüSo					60	0.0	0.0
Informal votes		2,793			2,480		
Total valid votes		137,374			137,687		
Turnout		140,167	70.9	▼6.9			
CDU hold	Majority	29,543	21.5	▲9.3			

=== 2005 election ===
Federal election (2005):Konstanz
Notes:	Blue background denotes the winner of the electorate vote. Pink background denotes a candidate elected from their party list. Yellow background denotes an electorate win by a list member, or other incumbent. A ✓ or ✗ denotes status of any incumbent, win or lose respectively.						
Party	Candidate	Votes	%	±%	Party votes	%	±%
CDU	Andreas Jung	64,745	43.9	▼0.3	55,279	37.3	▼2.6
SPD	Peter Friedrich	46,713	31.7	▼0.4	44,123	29.8	▼4.0
FDP	Birgit Homburger	15,504	10.5	▲0.9	20,274	13.7	▲4.1
Greens	Till Seiler	13,065	8.9	▼2.1	17,958	12.1	▼0.6
Left	Hans-Peter Koch	5,420	3.7	▲2.1	5,665	3.8	▲2.7
NPD	Romuaid Preisner	2,129	1.4		1,561	1.1	▲0.8
Familie					944	0.6	
REP					840	0.6	▼0.1
GRAUEN					720	0.5	▲0.3
PBC					541	0.4	0.0
BüSo					129	0.1	▲0.1
MLPD					123	0.1	
Informal votes		3,053			2,472		
Total valid votes		147,576			148,157		
Turnout		150,629	77.9	▼1.9			
CDU hold	Majority	18,032	12.2				
