= Gera – Greiz – Altenburger Land =

Federal electoral district of Germany

193 Gera – Greiz – Altenburger Land
- Electoral district for the Bundestag
- Gera – Greiz – Altenburger Land in 2025
- State: Thuringia
- Population: 279,900 (2019)
- Electorate: 229,588 (2021)
- Major settlements: Gera; Altenburg; Greiz
- Area: 1,567.5 km^{2}

Current electoral district
- Created: 1990
- Party: AfD
- Member: Stephan Brandner
- Elected: 2021, 2025

Gera – Greiz – Altenburger Land is an electoral constituency (German: Wahlkreis) represented in the Bundestag. It elects one member via first-past-the-post voting. Under the current constituency numbering system, it is designated as constituency 193. It is located in eastern Thuringia, comprising the city of Gera and the districts of Altenburger Land and Greiz.

Gera – Greiz – Altenburger Land was created for the inaugural 1990 federal election after German reunification. Since 2021, it has been represented by Stephan Brandner of Alternative for Germany (AfD).

== Geography ==
Gera – Greiz – Altenburger Land is located in eastern Thuringia. As of the 2021 federal election, it comprises the independent city of Gera and the districts of Altenburger Land and Greiz.

== History ==
Gera – Greiz – Altenburger Land was created after German reunification in 1990, then known as Altenburg – Schmölln – Greiz – Gera-Land II. From 2002 through 2013, it was named Greiz – Altenburger Land. It acquired its current name in the 2017 election. In the 1990 through 1998 elections, it was constituency 304 in the numbering system. In the 2002 election, it was number 197. In the 2005 election, it was number 196. In the 2009 and 2013 elections, it was number 195. In the 2017 and 2021 elections, it was number 194. From the 2025 election, it has been number 193.

Originally, the constituency comprised the districts of Greiz, Altenburg, Schmölln, and Landkreis Gera. In the 2002 through 2013 elections, it comprised the districts of Greiz and Altenburger Land. It acquired its current borders in the 2017 election.

Election	No.	Name	Borders
1990	304	Altenburg – Schmölln – Greiz – Gera-Land II	Greiz district; Altenburg district; Schmölln district; Landkreis Gera district
1994	304	Altenburg – Schmölln – Greiz – Gera-Land II	Greiz district; Altenburg district; Schmölln district; Landkreis Gera district
1998	304	Altenburg – Schmölln – Greiz – Gera-Land II	Greiz district; Altenburg district; Schmölln district; Landkreis Gera district
2002	197	Greiz – Altenburger Land	Greiz district; Altenburger Land district
2005	196	Greiz – Altenburger Land	Greiz district; Altenburger Land district
2009	195	Greiz – Altenburger Land	Greiz district; Altenburger Land district
2013	195	Greiz – Altenburger Land	Greiz district; Altenburger Land district
2017	194	Gera – Greiz – Altenburger Land	Gera city; Greiz district; Altenburger Land district
2021	194	Gera – Greiz – Altenburger Land	Gera city; Greiz district; Altenburger Land district
2025	193	Gera – Greiz – Altenburger Land	Gera city; Greiz district; Altenburger Land district

== Members ==
The constituency was first represented by Harald Kahl of the Christian Democratic Union (CDU) from 1990 to 1998. Peter Friedrich of the Social Democratic Party (SPD) was elected in 1998 and served a single term, followed by fellow SPD member Klaus-Werner Jonas until 2005. Volkmar Vogel was elected in 2005, and re-elected in 2009, 2013, and 2017. Stephan Brandner of the Alternative for Germany (AfD) was elected in 2021.

Election	Member	Party	%
1990	Harald Kahl	CDU	47.7
1994	Harald Kahl	CDU	45.4
1998	Peter Friedrich	SPD	39.3
2002	Klaus-Werner Jonas	SPD	39.0
2005	Volkmar Vogel	CDU	31.7
2009	Volkmar Vogel	CDU	37.4
2013	Volkmar Vogel	CDU	44.9
2017	Volkmar Vogel	CDU	30.4
2021	Stephan Brandner	AfD	29.0
2025	Stephan Brandner	AfD	44.8

== Election results ==
=== 2025 election ===
Federal election (2025): Gera – Greiz – Altenburger Land
Notes:	Blue background denotes the winner of the electorate vote. Pink background denotes a candidate elected from their party list. Yellow background denotes an electorate win by a list member, or other incumbent. A ✓ or ✗ denotes status of any incumbent, win or lose respectively.						
Party	Candidate	Votes	%	±%	Party votes	%	±%
AfD	✓ Stephan Brandner	77,161	44.8	▲15.8	74,761	43.4	▲15.3
CDU	Cornelius Golembiewski	34,406	20.0	0.0	30,631	17.8	▲1.3
Left	Frank Tempel	20,441	11.9	▲0.1	22,450	13.0	▲1.8
SPD	Elisabeth Kaiser	18,698	10.9	▼11.3	13,622	7.9	▼14.0
BSW	Günter Polter	10,915	6.3	New	16,963	9.8	New
FDP	Marco Thiele	3,918	2.3	▼6.3	5,137	3.0	▼6.8
FW	Maik Witzel	3,416	2.0	New	2,276	1.3	▼0.1
Greens	Bernhard Stengele	3,323	1.9	▼1.9	4,924	2.9	▼1.6
Volt					721	0.4	▲0.2
BD					669	0.4	New
MLPD					209	0.1	▼0.2
Informal votes		1,434			1,349		
Total valid votes		172,278			172,363		
Turnout		173,712	78.9	▲5.6			
AfD hold	Majority	42,755	24.8	▲18.0			

=== 2021 election ===
Federal election (2021): Gera – Greiz – Altenburger Land
Notes:	Blue background denotes the winner of the electorate vote. Pink background denotes a candidate elected from their party list. Yellow background denotes an electorate win by a list member, or other incumbent. A ✓ or ✗ denotes status of any incumbent, win or lose respectively.						
Party	Candidate	Votes	%	±%	Party votes	%	±%
AfD	Stephan Brandner	48,034	29.0	▲1.7	46,659	28.1	▲1.0
SPD	Elisabeth Kaiser	36,760	22.2	▲10.3	36,326	21.9	▲10.5
CDU	✗ Volkmar Vogel	33,067	20.0	▼10.5	27,303	16.4	▼10.9
Left	Björn Harras	19,421	11.7	▼7.0	18,666	11.2	▼6.2
FDP	Marco Thiele	14,273	8.6	▲3.0	16,212	9.8	▲1.6
Greens	Doreen Rath	6,293	3.8	▲1.7	7,331	4.4	▲1.7
Independent	Gebhard Berger	3,649	2.2				
Tierschutzpartei					2,903	1.7	
dieBasis	Günther Langer	2,887	1.7		2,727	1.6	
FW					2,433	1.5	0.0
PARTEI					1,970	1.2	0.0
Pirates					706	0.4	0.0
Menschliche Welt					594	0.4	
NPD					537	0.3	▼0.9
MLPD	Klaus-Dieter Ilius	772	0.5		475	0.3	▲0.2
Independent	Bernd Nebeler	474	0.3				
Volt					369	0.2	
Team Todenhöfer					355	0.2	
Humanists					176	0.1	
ÖDP					154	0.1	▼0.3
V-Partei3					147	0.1	▼0.3
Informal votes		2,517			2,104		
Total valid votes		165,630			166,043		
Turnout		168,147	73.2	▼0.3			
AfD gain from CDU	Majority	11,274	6.8				

=== 2017 election ===
Federal election (2017): Gera – Greiz – Altenburger Land
Notes:	Blue background denotes the winner of the electorate vote. Pink background denotes a candidate elected from their party list. Yellow background denotes an electorate win by a list member, or other incumbent. A ✓ or ✗ denotes status of any incumbent, win or lose respectively.						
Party	Candidate	Votes	%	±%	Party votes	%	±%
CDU	✓ Volkmar Vogel	52,980	30.4	▼12.3	47,690	27.3	▼12.5
AfD	Robby Schlund	47,558	27.3	▲21.1	47,275	27.1	▲19.5
Left	Frank Tempel	32,573	18.7	▼7.5	30,402	17.4	▼7.6
SPD	Elisabeth Kaiser	20,627	11.8	▼2.3	19,845	11.4	▼2.9
FDP	Katja Grosch	9,712	5.6	▲4.2	14,315	8.2	▲5.6
Greens	Andreas Leps	3,652	2.1	▼0.7	4,709	2.7	▼0.8
FW	Günter Brinkmann	3,620	2.1	▲1.8	2,508	1.4	▲0.5
NPD					2,060	1.2	▼2.1
PARTEI					2,056	1.2	
Pirates					733	0.4	▼1.6
DM					728	0.4	
V-Partei³	Lisa Walther	1,201	0.7		725	0.4	
Independent	Jens Geidel	1,190	0.7				
Independent	Matthias Hüfken	1,000	0.6				
ÖDP					629	0.4	▼0.1
BGE					523	0.3	
MLPD					194	0.1	0.0
Informal votes		2,820			2,541		
Total valid votes		174,113			174,392		
Turnout		176,933	73.5	▲5.9			
CDU hold	Majority	5,422	3.1	▼17.5			

=== 2013 election ===
Federal election (2013): Greiz – Altenburger Land
Notes:	Blue background denotes the winner of the electorate vote. Pink background denotes a candidate elected from their party list. Yellow background denotes an electorate win by a list member, or other incumbent. A ✓ or ✗ denotes status of any incumbent, win or lose respectively.						
Party	Candidate	Votes	%	±%	Party votes	%	±%
CDU	✓ Volkmar Vogel	51,013	44.9	▲7.5	47,580	41.8	▲8.9
Left	Frank Tempel	27,627	24.3	▼5.0	26,173	23.0	▼5.7
SPD	Nikolaus Dorsch	15,873	14.0	▼3.6	16,213	14.2	▼2.3
AfD	Sieghardt Rydzewski	6,792	6.0		8,523	7.5	
NPD	Kevin Schulhauser	4,187	3.7	▼0.4	3,876	3.4	▼0.2
Greens	Jens Kämpfer	3,211	2.8	▼0.8	3,842	3.4	▼0.9
Pirates	Holger Peckmann	3,207	2.8		2,462	2.2	▼0.2
FDP	Daniel Scheidel	1,791	1.6	▼6.5	3,032	2.7	▼8.2
FW					1,177	1.0	
ÖDP					591	0.5	▲0.1
REP					282	0.2	▼0.1
MLPD					122	0.1	0.0
Informal votes		2,289			2,117		
Total valid votes		113,701			113,873		
Turnout		115,990	67,9	▲3.8			
CDU hold	Majority	23,386	20.6	▲12.5			

=== 2009 election ===
Federal election (2009): Greiz – Altenburger Land
Notes:	Blue background denotes the winner of the electorate vote. Pink background denotes a candidate elected from their party list. Yellow background denotes an electorate win by a list member, or other incumbent. A ✓ or ✗ denotes status of any incumbent, win or lose respectively.						
Party	Candidate	Votes	%	±%	Party votes	%	±%
CDU	✓ Volkmar Vogel	42,988	37.4	▲5.7	37,841	32.8	▲6.1
Left	Frank Tempel	33,672	29.3	▲3.4	33,017	28.6	▲2.1
SPD	Wilfried Präger	20,224	17.6	▼12.6	19,006	16.5	▼11.1
FDP	Johannes Frackowiak	9,237	8.0	▲2.9	12,557	10.9	▲2.0
NPD	Steffen Schneider	4,720	4.1	▼0.4	4,168	3.6	▼0.7
Greens	Vincent Müller	4,196	3.6	▲1.1	4,919	4.3	▲0.4
Pirates					2,707	2.3	
ÖDP					478	0.4	
REP					397	0.3	▼0.3
MLPD					156	0.1	▼0.2
Informal votes		1,952			1,743		
Total valid votes		115,037			115,246		
Turnout		116,989	64.2	▼11.5			
CDU hold	Majority	9,316	8.1	▲6.6			

=== 2005 election ===
Federal election (2005):Greiz - Altenburger Land
Notes:	Blue background denotes the winner of the electorate vote. Pink background denotes a candidate elected from their party list. Yellow background denotes an electorate win by a list member, or other incumbent. A ✓ or ✗ denotes status of any incumbent, win or lose respectively.						
Party	Candidate	Votes	%	±%	Party votes	%	±%
CDU	Volkmar Vogel	44,714	31.7	▼1.5	37,865	26.8	▼3.7
SPD	Andreas Schumann	42,586	30.2	▼8.8	39,083	27.6	▼11.6
Left	Frank Tempel	36,507	25.9	▲8.3	37,611	26.6	▲10.3
FDP	Jens Zimmer	7,289	5.2	▼2.2	12,571	8.9	▲2.3
NPD	Ralf Wohlleben	6,406	4.5		6,037	4.3	▲3.0
Greens	Marion Zimmer	3,661	2.6	▼0.3	5,423	3.8	▲0.5
GRAUEN					1,469	1.0	▲0.5
REP					912	0.6	▼0.2
MLPD					461	0.3	
Informal votes		3,159			2,890		
Total valid votes		141,163			141,432		
Turnout		144,322	75.7	▲1.7			
CDU gain from SPD	Majority	2,128	1.5				
