= Hans-Peter Repnik =

German politician (1947–2025)

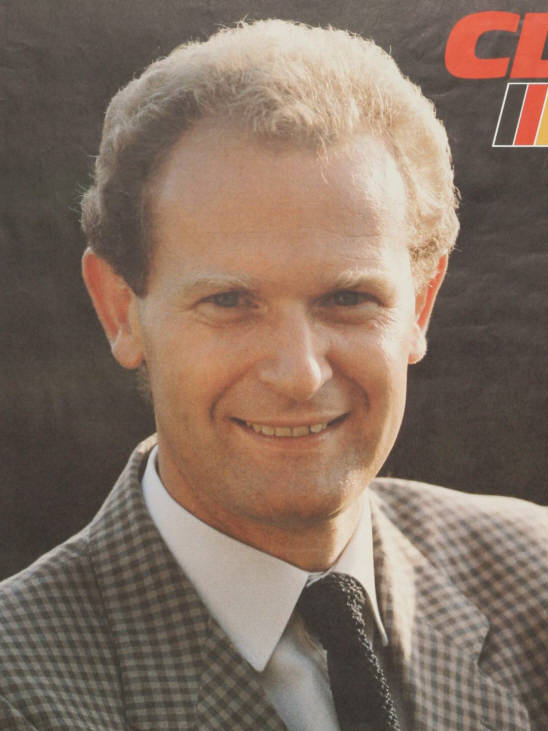
- Repnik in 1983

Member of the Bundestag; for Konstanz
- In office 4 November 1980 – 18 October 2005
- Preceded by: Hermann Biechele
- Succeeded by: Andreas Jung

Personal details
- Born: 27 May 1947 Konstanz, Baden, Germany
- Died: 5 April 2025 (aged 77) Singen, Baden-Württemberg, Germany
- Party: Christian Democratic Union
- Children: 2
- Education: University of Freiburg
- Occupation: Civil servant

Hans-Peter Repnik (27 May 1947 – 5 April 2025) was a German politician. A member of the Christian Democratic Union, he served in the Bundestag from 1980 to 2005.

Repnik died in Singen on 5 April 2025, at the age of 77.
