= Carsten Schneider =

German politician

Carsten Schneider MdB
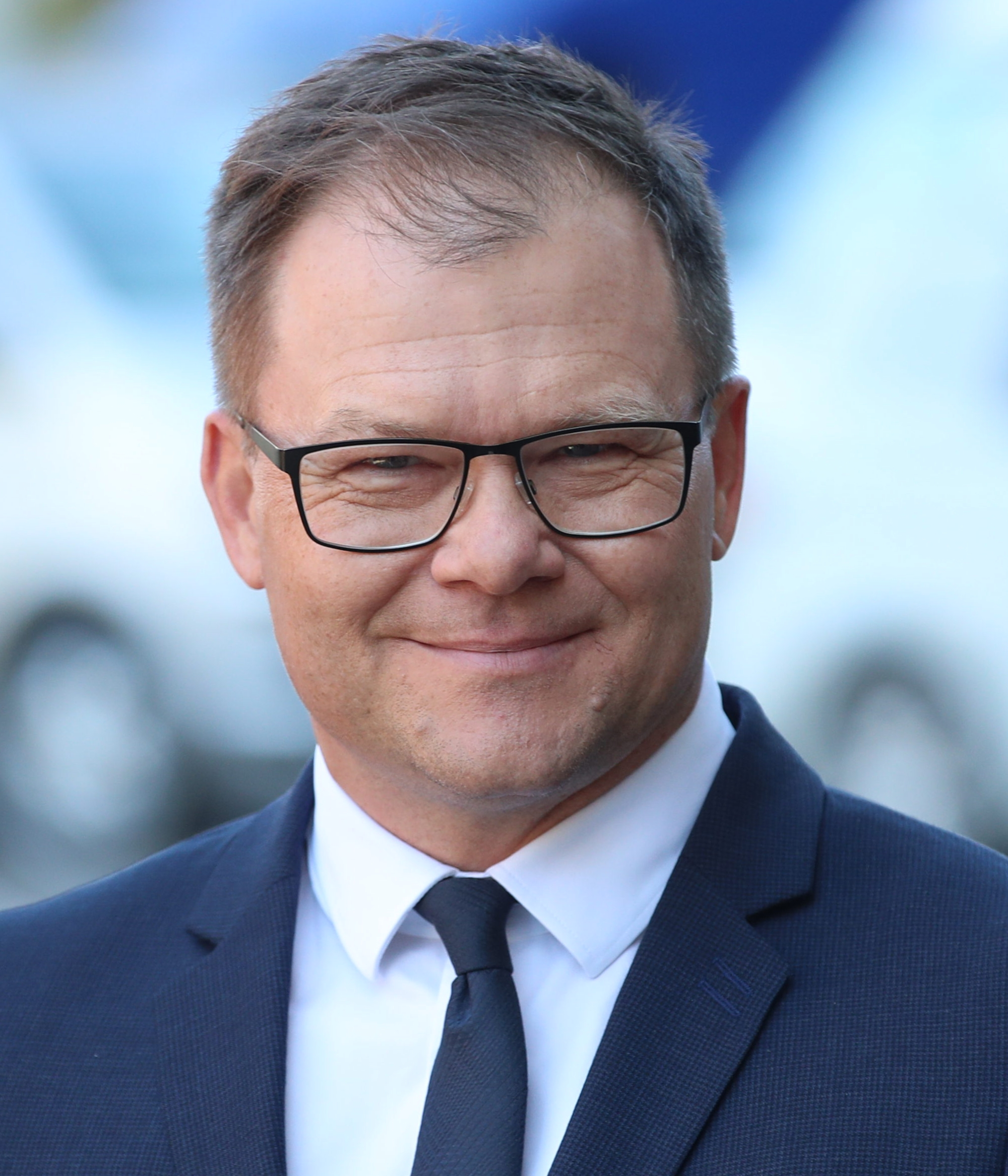
- Schneider in 2025

Minister for the Environment, Nature Conservation, Climate Action and Nuclear Safety
- Incumbent
- Assumed office 6 May 2025
- Chancellor: Friedrich Merz
- Preceded by: Steffi Lemke (Minister for the Environment, Nature Conservation, Nuclear Safety and Consumer Protection)

Minister of State for East Germany and Equivalent Living Conditions
- In office 8 December 2021 – 6 May 2025
- Chancellor: Olaf Scholz
- Preceded by: Marco Wanderwitz (as Parliamentary State Secretary for the New States)
- Succeeded by: Elisabeth Kaiser

Chief Whip of the SPD Group in the Bundestag
- In office 24 October 2017 – 8 December 2021
- Leader: Rolf Mützenich
- Preceded by: Christine Lambrecht
- Succeeded by: Katja Mast

Member of the Bundestag for Thuringia
- Incumbent
- Assumed office 26 October 1998
- Preceded by: Norbert Otto
- Constituency: Erfurt (1998–2005); Erfurt – Weimar – Weimarer Land II (2005–2009); Social Democratic List (2009–present)

Personal details
- Born: 23 January 1976 (age 50) Erfurt, East Germany
- Party: SPD

Carsten Schneider (born 23 January 1976) is a German politician of the Social Democratic Party (SPD) who has been serving as Federal Minister for the Environment, Nature Conservation, Climate Action and Nuclear Safety in the government of Chancellor Friedrich Merz since 2025.

Schneider has been a member of the German Parliament since 1998. From 2017 until 2021, Schneider was the First Secretary of his party's parliamentary group, in this position assisting the group's successive chairs Andrea Nahles (2017–2019) and Rolf Mützenich (2019–2021). In addition to his parliamentary work, he served as Parliamentary State Secretary for East Germany and Equivalent Living Conditions in Chancellor Olaf Scholz's cabinet from 2021 to 2025.

== Early life ==
After graduating from Wilhelm-Häßler-Gymnasium in Erfurt, Thuringia, and completing his alternative civilian service, Schneider accepted a position at an Erfurt savings bank in 1998.

== Political career ==
Schneider joined the SPD in 1995. He became active in Young Socialists in the SPD and eventually was elected chairman of the Thuringian chapter. Until 2017, he also belonged to the leadership of the SPD in Thuringia.

In the 1998 federal elections, at age 22, Schneider became the then-youngest representative in the German Parliament, representing Erfurt from 1998 to 2005 and the successor constituency of Erfurt – Weimar – Weimarer Land II since 2005. He was a member of the Budget Committee, where he served as his parliamentary group's rapporteur on the budgets of the Federal Ministry of Education and Research and the Office of the Federal President. He is also a member of the Thuringian SPD parliamentary caucus, of which he became speaker in 2005.

From 2008 to 2010, Schneider was a member of the parliamentary body providing oversight of the Special Financial Market Stabilization Funds (SoFFin).

In 2012, Schneider was selected as one of three speakers of the Seeheim Circle.

In the negotiations to form a Grand Coalition of the Christian Democrats (CDU together with the Bavarian CSU) and the Social Democrats (SPD) following the 2013 federal elections, Schneider was part of the SPD delegation in the working group on financial policies and the national budget, led by Wolfgang Schäuble and Olaf Scholz. He had previously publicly expressed his doubts about the Social Democrats joining a coalition government with the CDU/CSU, having preferred a coalition with the center-left Alliance '90/The Greens.

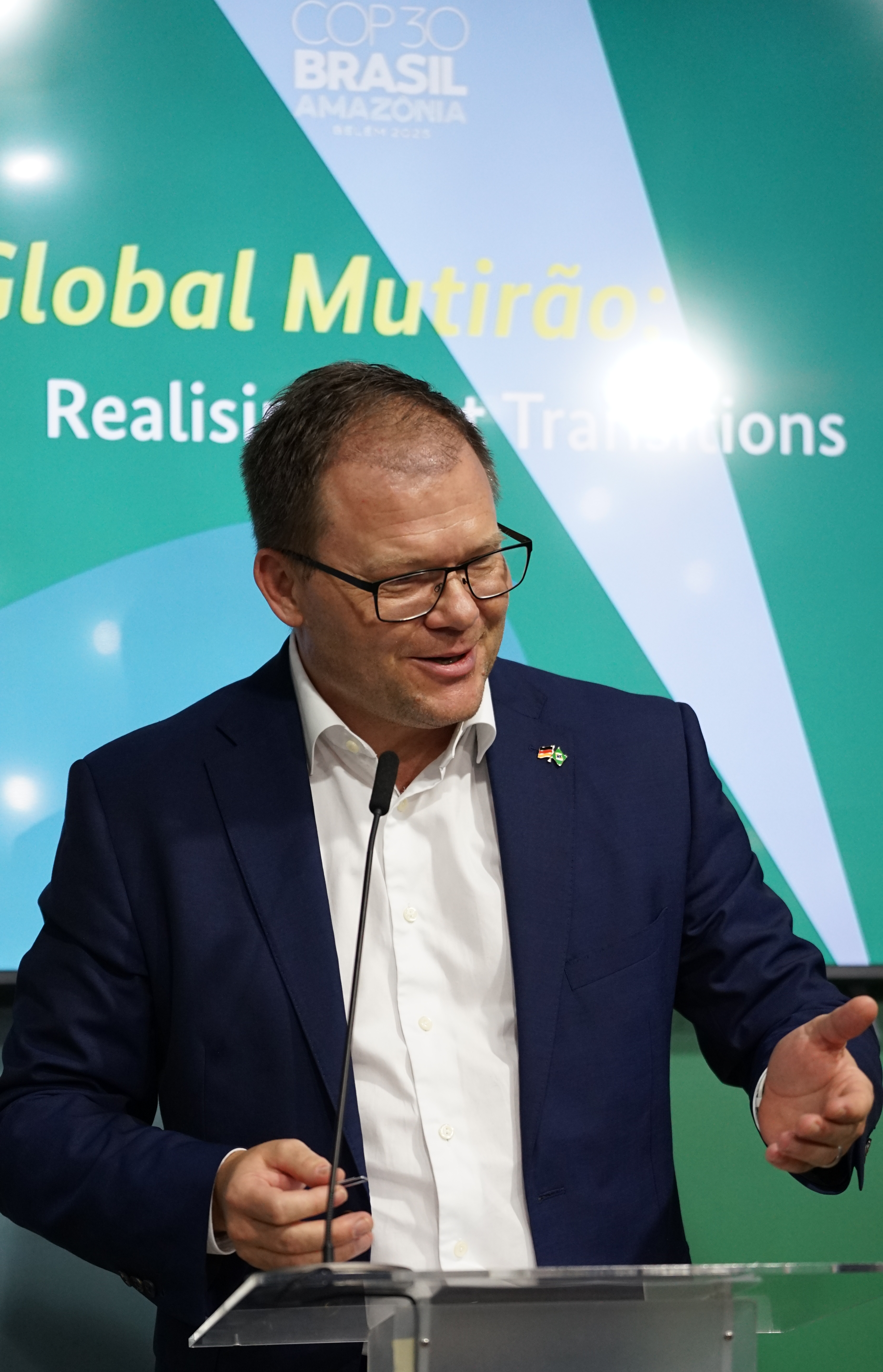
Schneider at COP30 (2025)

Following the formation of the third cabinet of Federal Chancellor Angela Merkel, Schneider served as deputy chairman of the SPD parliamentary group under the leadership of Thomas Oppermann. He was also the chairman of the so-called Confidential Committee (Vertrauensgremium) of the Budget Committee, which provides budgetary supervision for Germany's three intelligence services, BND, BfV and MAD.

In addition, Schneider has been a delegate to the Conference established under Article 13 of the European Fiscal Compact since 2014; this body assembles members of the relevant committees of the European Parliament and national parliaments to discuss economic and fiscal policy and other matters concerning stability, coordination and governance in the Economic and Monetary Union of the European Union.

Following the 2017 election, Schneider succeeded Christine Lambrecht as First Secretary of the SPD parliamentary group, in this position assisting the group's chairwoman Andrea Nahles. In this capacity, he was also a member of the parliament's Council of Elders, which – among other duties – determines daily legislative agenda items and assigns committee chairpersons based on party representation.

Ahead of the 2021 elections, Schneider was elected to lead the SPD campaign in Thuringia for the fourth consecutive time. In the negotiations to form a so-called traffic light coalition of the SPD, the Green Party and the FDP following the elections, he led his party's delegation in the working group on economic policy; his co-chairs from the other parties were Cem Özdemir and Michael Theurer.

== Other activities ==
In addition to his political work, Schneider holds a number of paid and unpaid positions.

=== Corporate boards ===
- Germany Trade and Invest (GTAI), Ex-Officio Member of the Supervisory Board (since 2022)
- KfW, Member of the Board of Supervisory Directors (since 2010)
- Association of Sparda Banks, Member of the Advisory Board
- CNC Communications & Network Consulting, Member of the Board of Experts (since 2009)
- Stadtwerke Erfurt, Member of the Supervisory Board (2002-2006)

=== Non-profit organizations ===
- Federal Foundation for the Reappraisal of the SED Dictatorship, Member of the Board of Trustees (since 2022)
- Fraunhofer Society, Member of the Senate
- Friends of the Bauhaus Museum, Member of the Board of Trustees
- Federal Financial Supervisory Authority (BaFin), Alternate Member of the Administrative Council
- German-Brazilian Society (DBG), Member of the Board of Trustees (2013-2014)

Since 2001, Schneider has acted as chairman for “Erfurt Runs” (Erfurt rennt) a relay race around the Erfurt Cathedral to support tolerance and inclusion. He is also a member of the board of trustees for the Bonn-based Community-Mindedness Campaign.

== Political positions ==
=== Eurozone crisis management ===
Schneider has been critical of Chancellor Angela Merkel and her policy of bailouts for Greece and Cyprus. In August 2011, he publicly criticized Labor Minister Ursula von der Leyen for demanding collateral from euro-area members needing financial aid.

Schneider also criticized a possible bailout that would not punish foreign tax evaders storing their money in Cypriot banks. In April 2013, he helped build support among the SPD parliamentary group for the incumbent center-right government's move to contribute to a 10 billion euros international bailout of Cyprus that included losses for uninsured depositors in two of the island's banks.

In 2011, Schneider and his counterpart Norbert Barthle from the Conservative CDU urged Portugal to consider selling some of its gold reserves to ease debt woes and therefore reduce the cost to German taxpayers of bailing it out.

=== Banking sector ===
In an opinion piece for the Financial Times, he expressed doubt in Merkel and the CDU/CSU coalition's plan to begin to recapitalize banks involved in European sovereign-debt crisis, saying:

"A supervisory institution without the authority to wind up failing banks is, in effect, a guarantee of survival for big banks. The ESM would strengthen their capacity to blackmail the public."

In 2011, Schneider advocated a salary cap of 500,000 euros ($692,400) and a higher tax on bonus payments for bankers whose companies may need government help.

On the European Commission’s 2014 proposal for a structural reform of the EU banking sector, Schneider criticized the measures as insufficient and held that "separating certain risky business, such as credit to hedge funds, from banks' core business is a central lesson from the financial crisis".

== Personal life ==
Schneider has been married since 2003. The couple has two daughters.
