= Oliver Wittke =

German politician

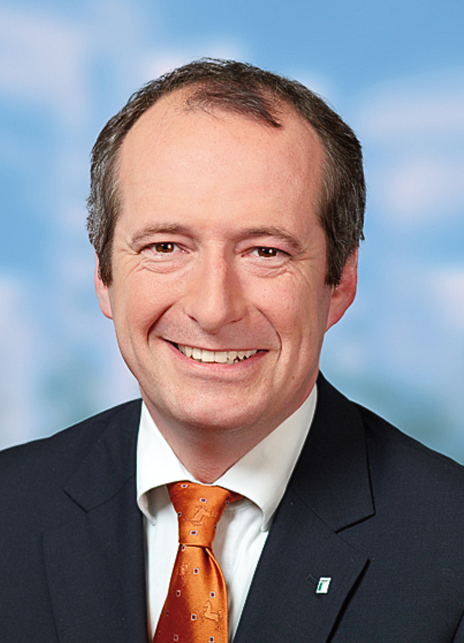

Member of the Bundestag
- In office 2013–2019

Personal details
- Born: 24 September 1966 (age 60) Marl, West Germany
- Party: German: Christian Democratic Union; EU: European People's Party
- Education: Ruhr University Bochum

Oliver Wittke (born 24 September 1966) is a German politician of the Christian Democratic Union (CDU).

== Early life and education ==
Born in Marl, North Rhine-Westphalia, Wittke studied geosciences and economics at the Ruhr University Bochum.

== Career in state politics ==
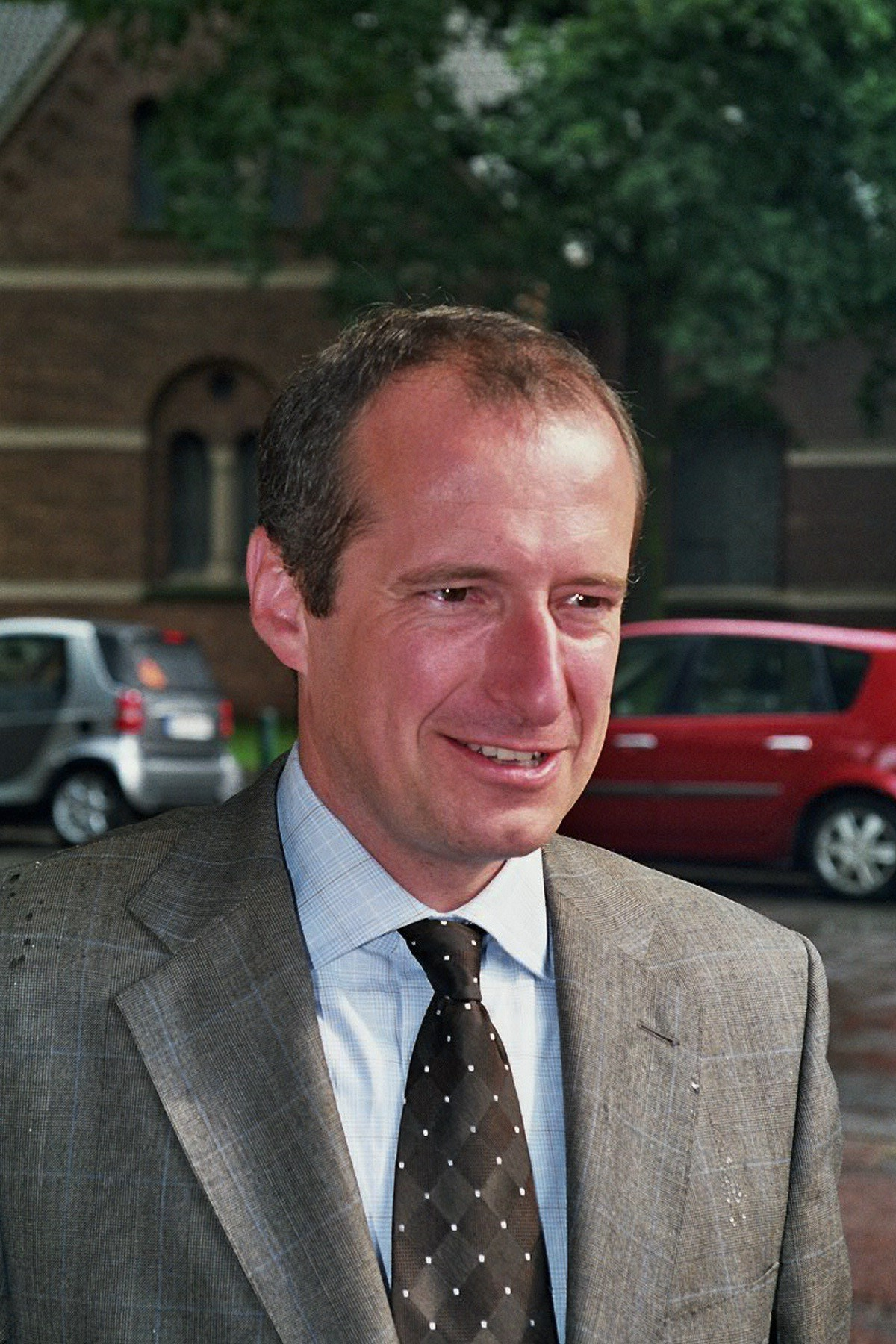
Wittke in 2005

From 1999 to 2004, Wittke was the direct elected mayor of Gelsenkirchen, this office was ever hold before by politicians of the SPD.

On 24 June 2005, Wittke was appointed State Minister of Construction and Transport in the cabinet of Minister-President Jürgen Rüttgers of North Rhine-Westphalia. From 10 December 2007 he was a member of the Landtag of North Rhine-Westphalia, representing the electoral district of Herford. On 11 February 2009, he resigned from his ministerial post due to revelations that he had been caught speeding (107 km/h in a residential zone) in November 2008. Pursuant to German law, he was barred from driving for a period of two months. He had committed a similarly severe traffic violation in 2000, and had been barred from driving for four weeks.

From 2010 until 2012, Wittke served as Secretary-General of the CDU of North Rhine-Westphalia, under the leadership of chairman Norbert Röttgen.

Following the 2017 state elections in North Rhine-Westphalia, Wittke was part of the Armin Laschet’s team in the negotiations between CDU and Free Democratic Party on a coalition agreement.

== Career in national politics ==
Wittke was first elected to the German Bundestag in the 2013 federal elections. He served on the Committee on Transport and Digital Infrastructure and its Sub-Committee on Municipal Politics. On the Committee on Transport and Digital Infrastructure, he was his parliamentary group's rapporteur on road haulage services, the transport of hazardous goods, railway and automobile technologies, and the motorway toll.

In addition to his committee assignments, Wittke was a member of the German-Turkish Parliamentary Friendship Group.

In the negotiations to form a coalition government under the leadership of Chancellor Angela Merkel following the 2017 federal elections, Wittke was part of the working group on transport and infrastructure, led by Michael Kretschmer, Alexander Dobrindt and Sören Bartol. With the formation of the fourth Grand Coalition, it was announced that Wittke would move to the position of Parliamentary State Secretary at the Federal Ministry of Economic Affairs and Energy under Minister Peter Altmaier. In this capacity, he also served as the ministry's Special Coordinator for the Extractive Industries Transparency Initiative (EITI).

Together with Roland Heintze, Daniel Günther, Andreas Jung, David McAllister, Nadine Schön and Antje Tillmann, Wittke co-chaired the CDU’s 2018 national convention in Hamburg.

== Life after politics ==
In October 2019, Wittke submitted his resignation from government and instead became the managing director of the German Property Federation (ZIA).

== Other activities ==
=== Corporate boards ===
- Deutsche Bahn, Member of the Supervisory Board (2018–2019)
- AGR Abfallentsorgungs-Gesellschaft Ruhrgebiet, Chairman of the Supervisory Board
- FAKT Immobilien AG, Member of the Supervisory Board (-2014)

=== Non-profit organizations ===
- Institut der deutschen Wirtschaft, Member of the Board of Trustees

== Political positions ==
In June 2017, Wittke voted against his parliamentary group’s majority and in favor of Germany’s introduction of same-sex marriage.

Ahead of the Christian Democrats’ leadership election in 2018, Wittke publicly endorsed Annegret Kramp-Karrenbauer to succeed Angela Merkel as the party's chair. He later endorsed Norbert Röttgen as Kramp-Karrenbauer's successor at the party's 2021 leadership election.
