= Karola Stange =

German politician

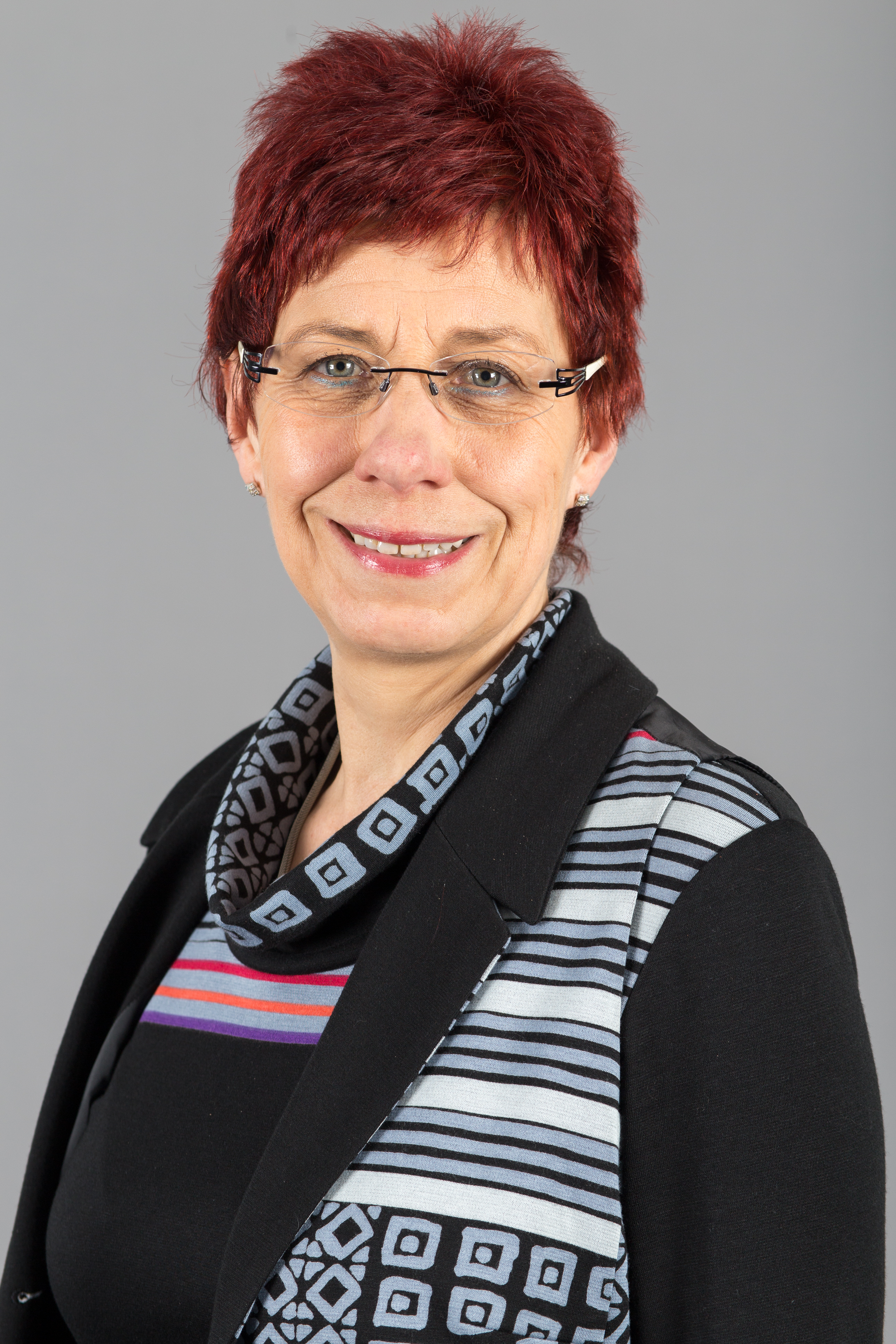
- Stange in 2016

Member of the Landtag of Thuringia
- Incumbent
- Assumed office 30 August 2009
- Preceded by: Bodo Ramelow
- Constituency: Erfurt I
- Majority: 5,871 (28.9%)

Personal details
- Born: Karola-Elke Unger; 27 October 1959 (age 66) Weimar, East Germany
- Party: The Left (2007–present); PDS (1990–2007); SED (before 1990)
- Children: 2

Karola Stange (born Karola-Elke Unger on 27 October 1959) is a German politician of The Left who has served as a member of the Landtag of Thuringia since 2009. She has also been a member of the Erfurt city council since 1999, and unsuccessfully ran for mayor of the city in 2006 and 2018.

== Personal life ==
Stange grew up in the outskirts of Weimar where she attended the polytechnic high school in Mellingen and Lehnstedt. After completing the 10th grade in 1976, she completed an apprenticeship as a gardener at the LPG "Valley of Peace" in Kromsdorf, followed by a technical college degree at the Horticultural Engineering School in Erfurt from 1979 to 1982.

Stange is married and has two children and three grandchildren.

== Political career ==
From 1984, Stange was an employee of the SED district executive as a horticulture specialist. From 1988 she was employed by the Erfurt city executive. After the Peaceful Revolution, she worked for the PDS association in Erfurt, becoming a staffer for the party's faction in the Landtag of Thuringia in 1991. She was an advisor on social, senior, and disability policy until 2009.

Stange was elected to the Erfurt city council in 1999, as well as the Hochheim neighbourhood council. She was the PDS's candidate in the 2006 local elections, was unsuccessful in her bid for mayor. After the PDS merged into The Left in 2007, she was elected to the Landtag in 2009. She won in the constituency of Erfurt I, narrowly retaining it for the party; it had previously been held by state chairman Bodo Ramelow. She was re-elected in 2014 with an increased majority of 36.8% of total votes, and again in 2019 with 28.9%.

Stange was the Left's candidate in Erfurt – Weimar – Weimarer Land II during the 2013 federal election. She placed third with 23.4% of votes, and was not elected. In 2015, she became deputy leader of the Left's group in the Erfurt city council. She ran for mayor of Erfurt for a second time in 2018 as candidate for The Left, placing fourth with 11.1% of votes. She is currently speaker for gender equality and disability policy in the Landtag.
