= Andreas Jung =

German politician (born 1975)

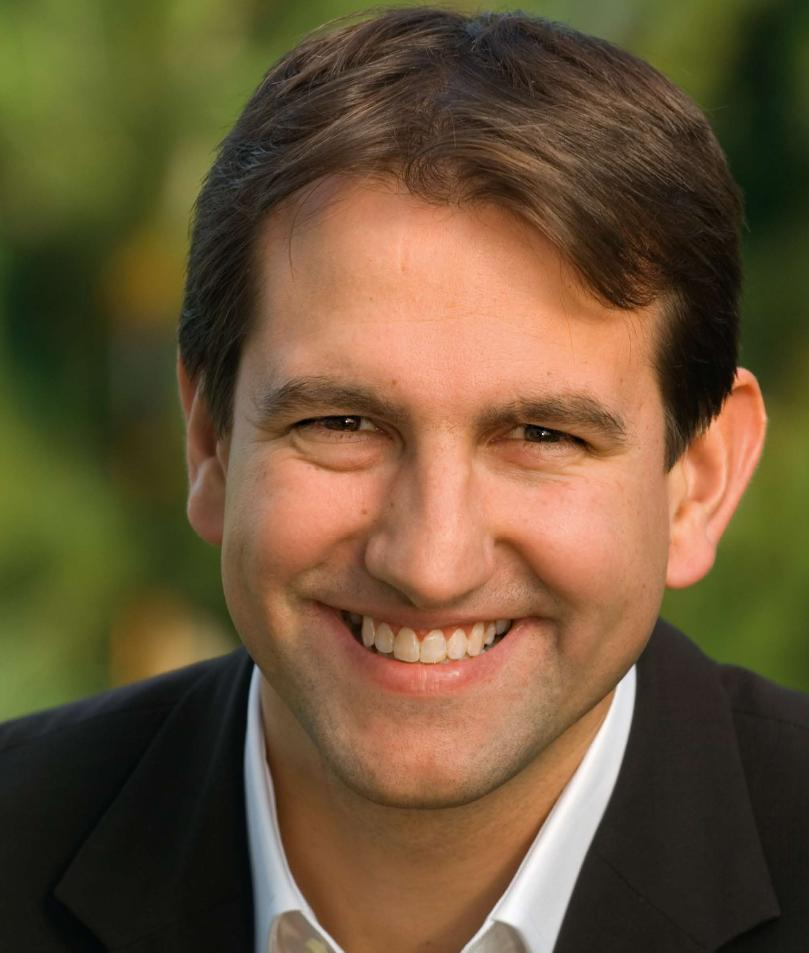
- Jung in 2009

Deputy Leader of the Christian Democratic Union
- Incumbent
- Assumed office 31 January 2022 Serving with Silvia Breher, Michael Kretschmer, Carsten Linnemann and Karin Prien
- Leader: Friedrich Merz
- Preceded by: Thomas Strobl

Minister for Education, Youth and Sport of Baden-Württemberg
- Incumbent
- Assumed office 13 May 2026
- Minister-President: Cem Özdemir
- Preceded by: Theresa Schopper

Member of the Bundestag; for Konstanz
- In office 18 October 2005 – 18 May 2026
- Preceded by: Hans-Peter Repnik
- Succeeded by: Seat vacant

Personal details
- Born: 13 May 1975 (age 51) Freiburg im Breisgau, West Germany
- Party: Christian Democratic Union
- Children: 2
- Education: University of Konstanz

Andreas Jung (born 13 May 1975) is a German lawyer and politician of the Christian Democratic Union (CDU) who served as a member of the Bundestag from the state of Baden-Württemberg from 2005 to 2026.

Since 2022, Jung has been one of five deputy chairs of the CDU, under the leadership of chairman Friedrich Merz.

== Political career ==
=== Member of the German Parliament, 2005–2026 ===
Jung first became a member of the Bundestag in the 2005 German federal election. From 2005 until 2013, he was a member of the Committee on the Environment, Nature Conservation and Nuclear Safety, where he served as his parliamentary group's rapporteur on climate protection. He also chaired the Parliamentary Advisory Board on Sustainable Development from 2009 until 2018.

In addition to his committee assignments, Jung chaired the German-French Parliamentary Friendship Group. From 2019 to 2026, he served as co-chair of the Franco-German Parliamentary Assembly.

In the negotiations to form a Grand Coalition of Chancellor Angela Merkel's Christian Democrats (CDU together with the Bavarian CSU) and the Social Democrats (SPD) following the 2013 federal elections, Jung was part of the CDU/CSU delegation in the working group on energy policy, led by Peter Altmaier and Hannelore Kraft. From 2014 to 2016, Jung was one of the members of the country's temporary National Commission on the Disposal of Radioactive Waste, chaired by Ursula Heinen-Esser and Michael Müller. In the negotiations to form another coalition government under Merkel's leadership following the 2017 federal elections, he was part of the working group on energy, climate protection and the environment, led by Armin Laschet, Georg Nüßlein and Barbara Hendricks.

From 2018 to 2021, Jung served as deputy chairman of the CDU/CSU parliamentary group, under the leadership of chairman Ralph Brinkhaus. In this capacity, he was the group's main spokesman for budgetary and financial issues.

Together with Roland Heintze, Daniel Günther, David McAllister, Nadine Schön, Antje Tillmann and Oliver Wittke, Jung co-chaired the CDU's 2018 national convention in Hamburg.

In the negotiations to form a coalition government under the leadership of Minister-President of Baden-Württemberg Winfried Kretschmann following the 2021 state elections, Jung co-chaired the working group on climate, environmental policy and energy, alongside Sandra Detzer.

Ahead of the 2021 elections, CDU chairman Armin Laschet included Jung in his eight-member shadow cabinet for the Christian Democrats' campaign.

From 2025 to 2026, Jung served as deputy chair of the CDU/CSU parliamentary group again, this time under the leadership of chairman Jens Spahn. In this capacity, he oversaw the group's legislative activity on climate, the environment, sustainability and development cooperation.

=== Career in state politics ===
Following the 2026 election in Baden-Württemberg, Jung was nominated by his party to join the state government of Minister-President Cem Özdemir.

== Other activities ==
- Energy and Climate Policy and Innovation Council (EPICO), Chair of the Advisory Board (since 2021)
- Jacques Delors Centre at Hertie School, Member of the advisory board (since 2019)
- Franco-German Institute (DFI), Member of the Board
- German Industry Initiative for Energy Efficiency (DENEFF), Member of the Parliamentary Advisory Board
- Bundesverband Bioenergie (BBE), Member of the advisory board (-2018)

== Political positions ==
In June 2017, Jung voted against his parliamentary group's majority and in favor of Germany's introduction of same-sex marriage.

In April 2020, Jung co-signed – alongside around 50 other members of his parliamentary group – a letter to President of the European Commission Ursula von der Leyen which called on the European Union to take in children who were living in migrant camps across Greece.

== Personal life ==
Jung lives on Reichenau Island, grew up in Stockach on Lake Constance. He is Catholic, married with two children.
