= Volkmar Vogel =

German politician

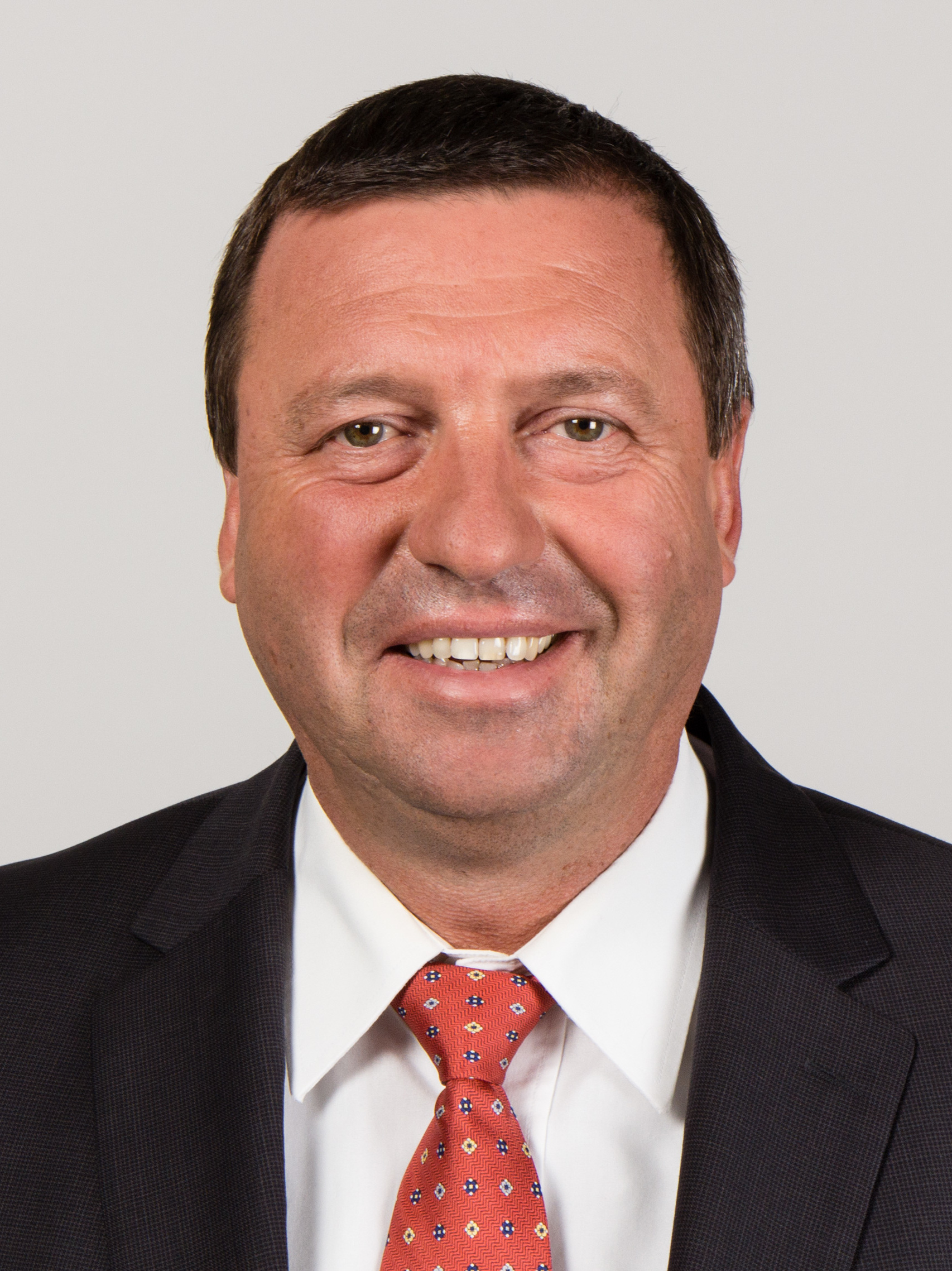
- Volkmar Vogel in 2013

Parliamentary State Secretary for Building, Housing and Urban Development
- In office 2020–2021
- Minister: Horst Seehofer
- Preceded by: Marco Wanderwitz
- Succeeded by: Sören Bartol and Cansel Kiziltepe

Member of the Bundestag
- In office 2002–2021

Personal details
- Born: 18 January 1959 (age 67) Gera, East Germany (now Germany)
- Party: CDU
- Children: 2

Volkmar Uwe Vogel (born 18 January 1959) is a German politician of the Christian Democratic Union (CDU) who served as a member of the Bundestag from the state of Thuringia from 2002 until 2021.

== Political career ==
Vogel first became a member of the Bundestag in the 2002 national elections, representing the Gera – Greiz – Altenburger Land district.

In parliament, he served on the Committee on Transport, Construction and Urban Development (2002–2013), the Committee for Consumer Protection, Food and Agriculture (2005–2009), the Committee on the Environment, Nature Conservation, Building and Nuclear Safety (2014–2020) and the Committee on Construction, Housing, Urban Development and Communities (2018–2020).

In addition to his committee assignments, Vogel was part of the German delegation to the Parliamentary Assembly of the Council of Europe from 2018 to 2020. In this capacity, he served on the Assembly's Committee on Migration, Refugees and Displaced Persons and its Sub-Committee on Refugee and Migrant Children and Young People.

From 2020 until 2021, Vogel served as Parliamentary State Secretary to the Federal Minister of the Interior Horst Seehofer.

== Other activities ==
- Federal Foundation for the Reappraisal of the SED Dictatorship, Member of the Board of Trustees (2020–2021)
- Federal Network Agency for Electricity, Gas, Telecommunications, Posts and Railway (BNetzA), Member of the Rail Infrastructure Advisory Council (2009–2013)
- Rockwool Germany, Member of the Advisory Board (2013–2020)
