= Hermann Biechele =

German politician (1918–1999)

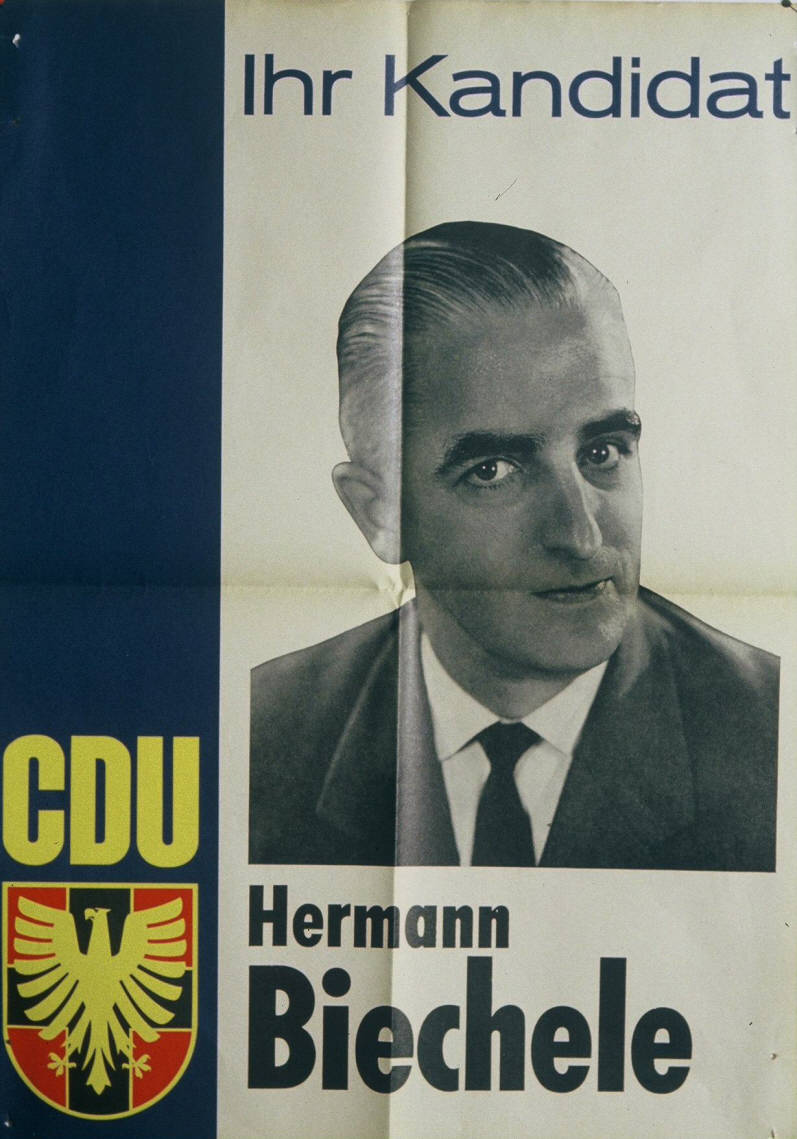
- Election poster (1961)

Member of the Bundestag; for Konstanz
- In office 17 October 1961 – 4 November 1980
- Preceded by: Josef Schüttler
- Succeeded by: Hans-Peter Repnik

Personal details
- Born: 1 March 1918 Konstanz, Germany
- Died: 15 April 1999 (aged 81) Tuttlingen, Germany
- Party: Christian Democratic Union
- Children: 4
- Relatives: Volker Kauder (son-in-law)
- Education: University of Freiburg

Hermann Biechele (1 March 1918 – 15 April 1999) was a German politician of the Christian Democratic Union (CDU) and former member of the German Bundestag.

== Life ==
Biechele had been a member of the CDU and the Junge Union since 1946. From 1955 to 1977 he was chairman of the CDU district association of Constance-Land. Biechele was elected to the German Bundestag in the 1961 federal elections by direct mandate in Constance, where he was a member for five terms until 1980.

== Literature ==
Herbst, Ludolf; Jahn, Bruno (2002). Vierhaus, Rudolf (ed.). Biographisches Handbuch der Mitglieder des Deutschen Bundestages. 1949–2002 [Biographical Handbook of the Members of the German Bundestag. 1949–2002] (in German). München: De Gruyter - De Gruyter Saur. p. 1715. ISBN 978-3-11-184511-1.
