= Frank Tempel =

German politician (born 1969)

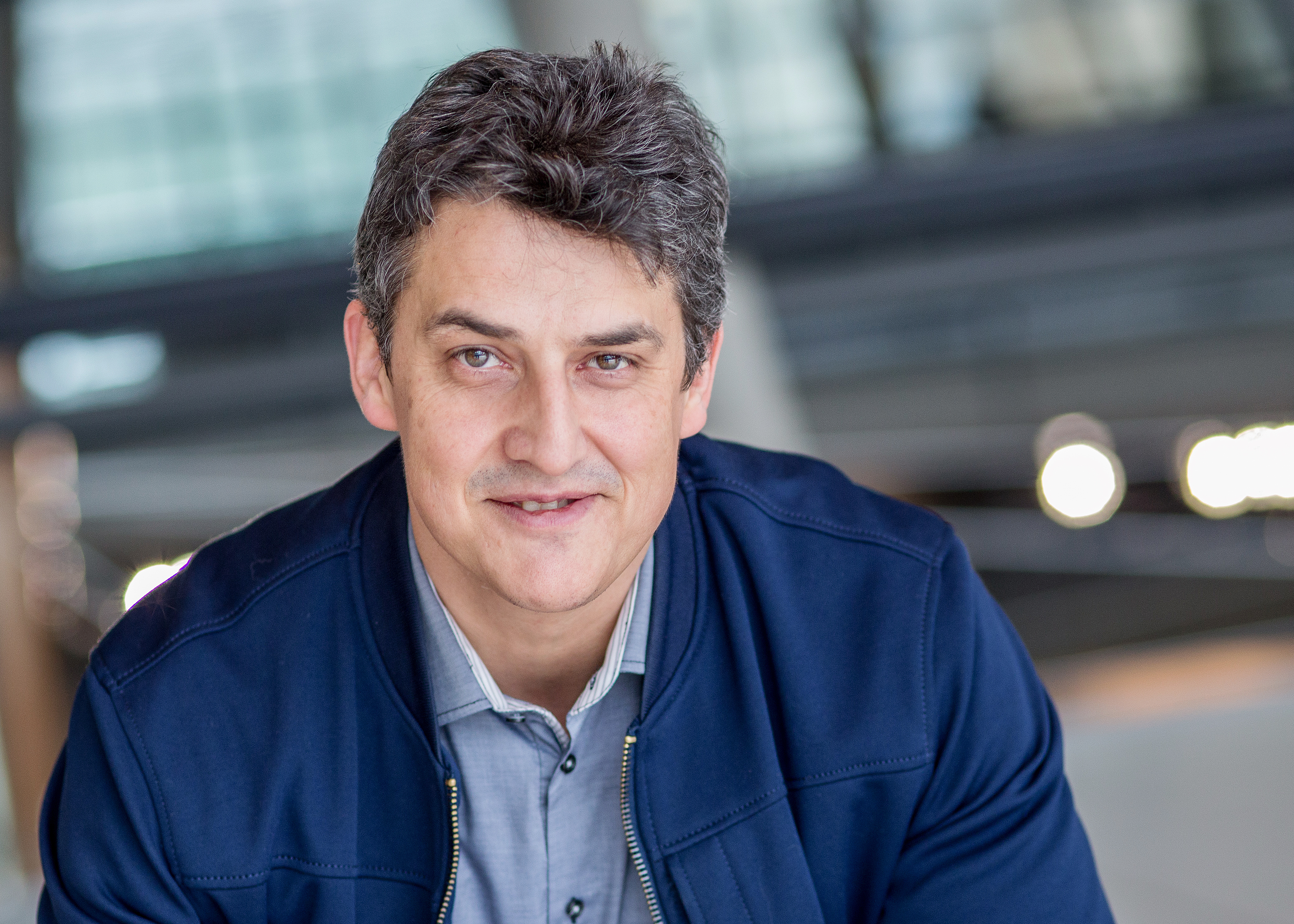

Member of the German Bundestag
- In office 2009–2017

Personal details
- Born: 19 January 1969 (age 57) Belzig, Germany
- Party: The Left
- Children: 4
- Occupation: Political

Frank Tempel (born 19 January 1969) is a German politician (Die Linke). He was a member of the German Bundestag from 2009 to 2017, where he was the drug policy spokesman for the Bundestag parliamentary group from May 2010. In January 2014, Frank Tempel was elected unopposed as deputy chairman of the Bundestag's Interior Committee. He was the first politician from Die Linke party to hold this post. From 2017 to 2019, he was head of the Domestic Violence Coordination Office in Thuringia. Since 2020, he has been back at the criminal investigation department in Gera.

== Biography ==
Frank Tempel was born on 19 January 1969 in Belzig, in the GDR, the son of a teacher couple. After attending the "Hanno Günther" polytechnic high school, he completed a three-year vocational training program with a high school diploma to become an agricultural machinery fitter. In 1988, Tempel committed himself to a career as a professional officer in the border troops of the GDR. He began his officer studies at the officer college of the border troops of the GDR "Rosa Luxemburg" in Suhl, but did not finish this due to the events surrounding the political change in the GDR. Tempel received a job as a social worker from 1990 to 1991, during which he supervised a youth project of the FDJ in Suhl in the area of social work. He then worked as a professional driver dismantling border installations in Sonneberg. After working briefly as a car mechanic, he was able to begin training in 1993 in the intermediate police civil service in Thuringia. After this training, he transferred to the Meiningen Police School in December 1996 to complete a two-year course of study at a university of applied sciences, which he finished in December 1998 with a degree in administration (Diplom-Verwaltungswirt (FH) Fachbereich Polizei). In 1999, Tempel was appointed as a criminal investigator in the higher service.

Tempel has been active in the police union since 1995, including two years as state chairman of the GdP's Young People's Group in Thuringia.

After leaving the German Bundestag, he returned to police service in November 2017. Shortly thereafter, he was seconded by the Thuringian state government to the newly established Domestic Violence Coordination Office in his capacity as a police officer. After two years, he returned to his old assignment at the Gera Criminal Investigation Department.

Frank Tempel lives in Zehma in a partnership and is the father of four children.

== Political career ==
When he began his officer studies, Tempel became a candidate for the SED. In 1990, he applied for a state parliamentary mandate as a candidate of the FDJ, whose state executive committee he was temporarily a member of, on the list of the Left List/PDS. However, he failed to enter parliament. In 1992, Tempel resigned from the PDS. In 2001, he again became a member of the PDS and - due to his place of residence - was active in the Altenburger Land district association. In 2004, Tempel moved into the Altenburger Land district council. Since 2007, he has also led the Altenburger Land district association of the Die Linke party as chairman. Furthermore, he is one of the initiators and a board member of LEAP (Law Enforcement Against Prohibition) Deutschland e. V., which advocates the legalization of drugs.

In May 2016, he was elected to the executive board of Die Linke party.

In 2005, he ran for a seat in the Bundestag for the first time as a candidate in the Greiz - Altenburger Land constituency. With 25.9% of the first vote and 6th place on the state list, he failed to make it into parliament. From 29 September 2009 he was a successor to Bodo Ramelow as a member of the 16th German Bundestag, which, however, no longer held a session. For the 2009 Bundestag election, Tempel received 29.3% of the first-past-the-post votes, which were not enough to win a direct mandate. Through the list position 4 he moved into the 17th German Bundestag. In the 2013 Bundestag election, he ran again at No. 4 on his party's state list and remained a member of the Bundestag. In the 18th Bundestag, Tempel was a full member of the Interior Committee and its deputy chairman. On 3 November 2015 he was elected deputy chairman of his party's parliamentary group in the Bundestag.

In the 2017 Bundestag election, he failed to win a direct mandate with 18.7% of the vote in the newly tailored Bundestag constituency of Gera - Greiz - Altenburger Land, and also fell short of entering the 19th German Bundestag via 4th place on his party's state list.

For the 2021 federal election, Tempel stood for his party in the constituency Saalfeld-Rudolstadt - Saale-Holzland-Kreis - Saale-Orla-Kreis, but was not elected to parliament, but is the first successor of his party in Thuringia.
