= Elisabeth Kaiser =

German politician (born 1987)

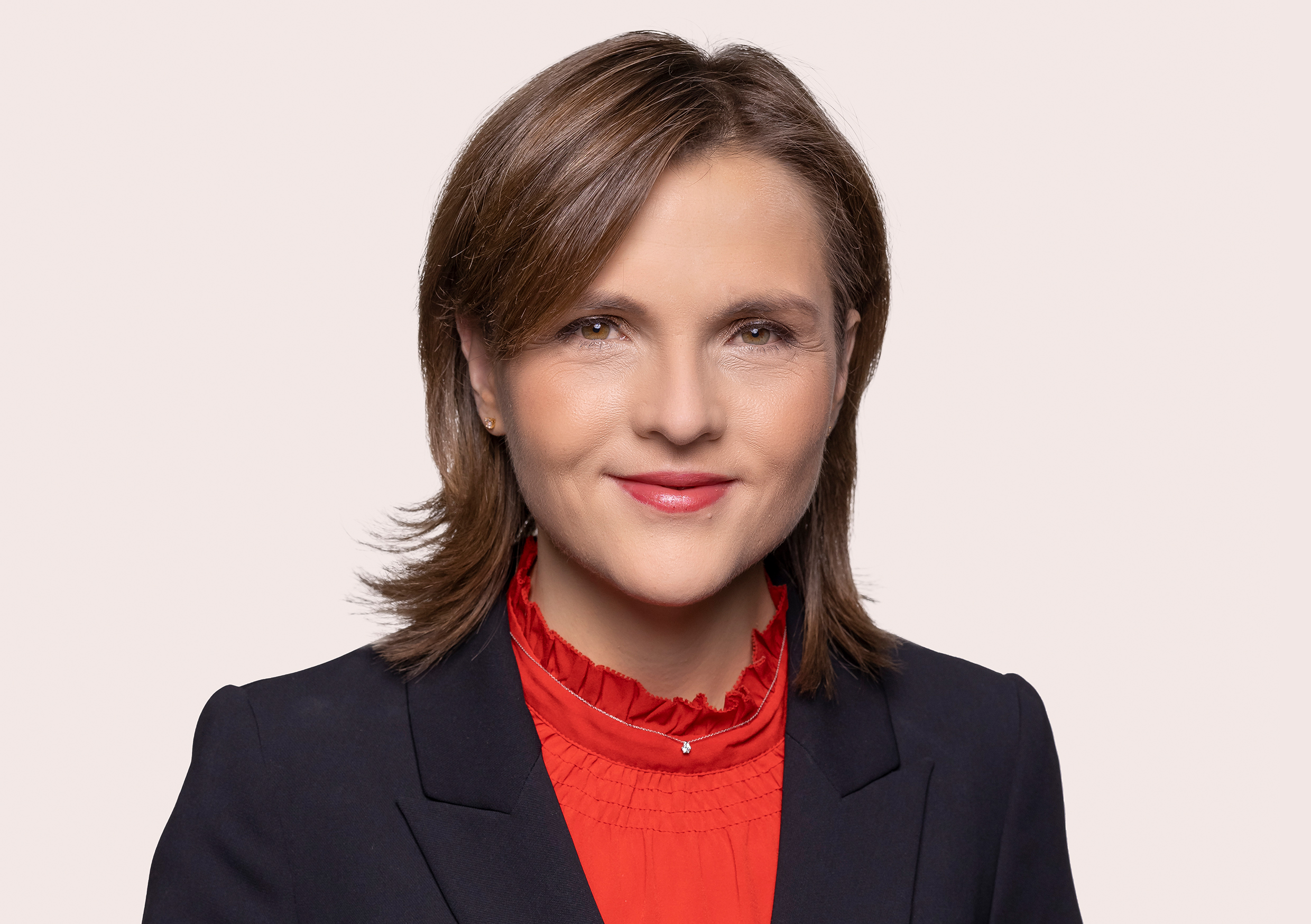

Minister of State for East Germany and Equivalent Living Conditions at the Federal Ministry of Finance
- Incumbent
- Assumed office 6 May 2025
- Chancellor: Friedrich Merz
- Preceded by: Carsten Schneider

Parliamentary State Secretary at the Federal Ministry for Housing, Urban Development and Building
- In office 12 January 2023 – 6 May 2025
- Chancellor: Olaf Scholz
- Minister: Klara Geywitz
- Preceded by: Office established
- Succeeded by: Sabine Poschmann

Member of the Bundestag
- Incumbent
- Assumed office 24 October 2017
- Constituency: Gera – Greiz – Altenburger Land

Personal details
- Born: 4 March 1987 (age 39) Gera, East Germany (now Germany)
- Party: SPD
- Education: University of Erfurt; University of Potsdam

Elisabeth Kaiser (née Lier, born 4 March 1987) is a German politician of the Social Democratic Party (SPD) who has been serving as a member of the Bundestag from the state of Thuringia since 2017.

In addition to her parliamentary work, Kaiser has been as Parliamentary State Secretary for East Germany and Equivalent Living Conditions at the Federal Ministry of Finance in the government of Chancellor Friedrich Merz since 2025. She was previously a Parliamentary State Secretary at the Federal Ministry for Housing, Urban Development and Building in the coalition government of Chancellor Olaf Scholz from 2023 to 2025.

== Early career ==
During her studies, Kaiser worked at Telefónica Germany from 2011 until 2012. She later worked at the German Society for Policy Advice (2013–2014) and as press spokesperson of the SPD parliamentary group in the State Parliament of Thuringia (2014–2017).

== Political career ==
Kaiser became a member of the Bundestag in the 2017 German federal election, representing the Gera – Greiz – Altenburger Land district. She is a member of the Committee for Home Affairs and the Committee for Construction, Housing, Urban Development and Communities.

In addition to her committee assignments, Kaiser has been a member of the German delegation to the Franco-German Parliamentary Assembly since 2019.

== Other activities ==
- German Federal Environmental Foundation (DBU), Member of the Board of Trustees (since 2024)
- German Foundation for Active Citizenship and Volunteering (DSEE), Member of the Board of Trustees (since 2020)
- Business Forum of the Social Democratic Party of Germany, Member of the Political Advisory Board (since 2020)
- Federal Agency for Civic Education (BPB), Member of the Board of Trustees (since 2018)
- Federal Foundation for the Reappraisal of the SED Dictatorship, Member of the Board of Trustees (since 2018)
- German United Services Trade Union (ver.di), Member
