= Ann-Veruschka Jurisch =

German politician (born 1972)

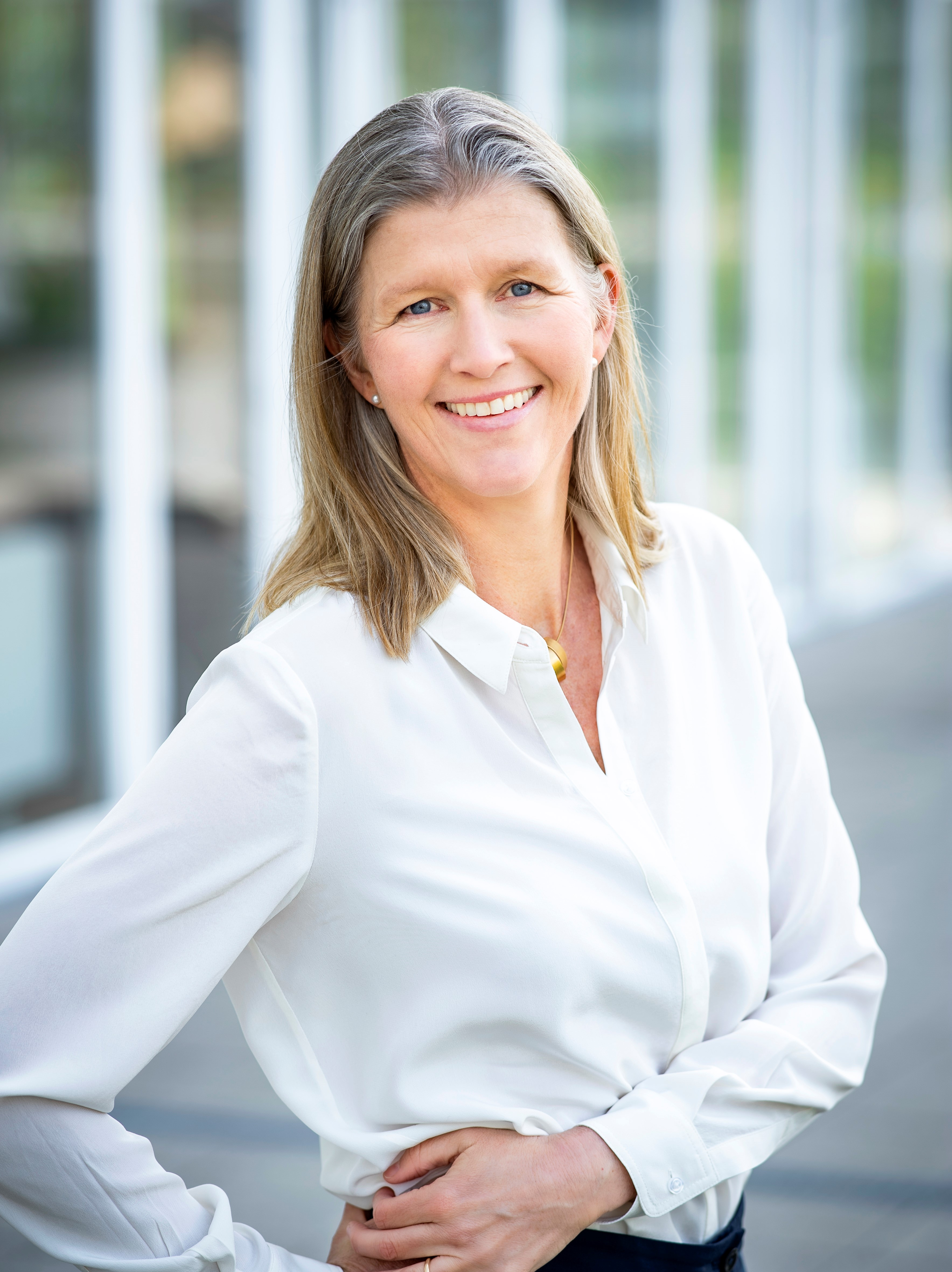
- Jurisch in 2021

Member of the Bundestag for Konstanz
- In office 2021–2025

Personal details
- Born: 10 January 1972 (age 54) Cologne, West Germany (now Germany)
- Party: Free Democratic Party
- Education: University of Konstanz; Fletcher School at Tufts University

Ann-Veruschka Jurisch (born 10 January 1972 in Cologne) is a German lawyer and politician of the Free Democratic Party (FDP) who served as a member of the Bundestag from 2021 to 2025.

== Life ==
Jurisch studied law at the University of Konstanz, passing both state exams. She received her doctorate there in 2001 with a thesis on consumer insolvency law under German and U.S. insolvency law. From 2002 to 2006, she worked at the German Federal Ministry for Economic Cooperation and Development, initially as a country officer in the Southeast Asia Department for Vietnam, Myanmar and Thailand. In 2005, she moved to the German Embassy in Hanoi. From 2006 to 2021, she worked as an executive director in the area of charitable foundations and from 2020 to 2021, she was simultaneously a subject matter expert on charitable giving at the Center for Philanthropy at the University of Liechtenstein. In 2019, she successfully completed a part-time master's degree in international relations at the Fletcher School of Law and Diplomacy in Boston. She is married and the mother of three children. Jurisch is of Protestant denomination.

== Early career ==
From 2011 to 2018, Jurisch served as the managing director of Switzerland-based Ernst Schmidheiny Foundation.

== Political career ==
In 2013, Jurisch joined the FDP and has been the local chairwoman of the FDP Konstanz since 2016. In the 2016 state election in Baden-Württemberg, she ran as a second candidate alongside Jürgen Keck. Jurisch became a member of the Bundestag in the 2021 elections, representing the Konstanz district. In parliament, she has since been serving on the Committee on Internal Affairs and Community and the Committee on European Affairs. In this capacity, she is her parliamentary group's rapporteur on migration. Jurisch stood in the electoral district of Constance and entered the 20th German Bundestag via 14th place on the state list of the FDP Baden-Württemberg.

In addition to her committee assignments, Jurisch was part of the German-Swiss Parliamentary Friendship Group.

== MPs ==
=== 20th legislative period (since 2021) ===
Jurisch is a full member of the Interior Committee of the Bundestag and the Committee on the Affairs of the European Union. She is the rapporteur for the parliamentary group of the Free Democrats in the area of domestic policy for honorary office, regular immigration and freedom of movement in the EU. In the area of European policy, Jurisch is responsible for European domestic and security policy (e.g. police and justice, civil protection, border protection and Human migration) and the topics of Asia, Africa and the Caribbean as well as the European Economic Area. In addition, she is responsible for issues relating to Portugal, Iceland and Switzerland from a European perspective. He is also a substitute member of the German-French Parliamentary Assembly. Since 8 July 2022, she has been a member of the 1st Committee of Inquiry of the 20th legislative period of the German Bundestag, which is to clarify the circumstances of the withdrawal of Bundeswehr troops from Afghanistan.

== Political positions ==
Jurisch is particularly committed to modernizing immigration law in Germany. According to her ideas, a modern immigration law should include a points system (immigration), as well as give higher weight to professional experience and a concluded employment contract. In her constituency of Constance, Jurisch advocates for the expansion of the Gaeubahn to ensure a better connection of the region to Stuttgart. In the Bundestag, she initiated a joint letter among members of the coalition to Federal Minister Volker Wissing for this purpose. In it, the deputies demanded a time schedule as well as funding commitments.
