= Lina Seitzl =

German politician (born 1989)

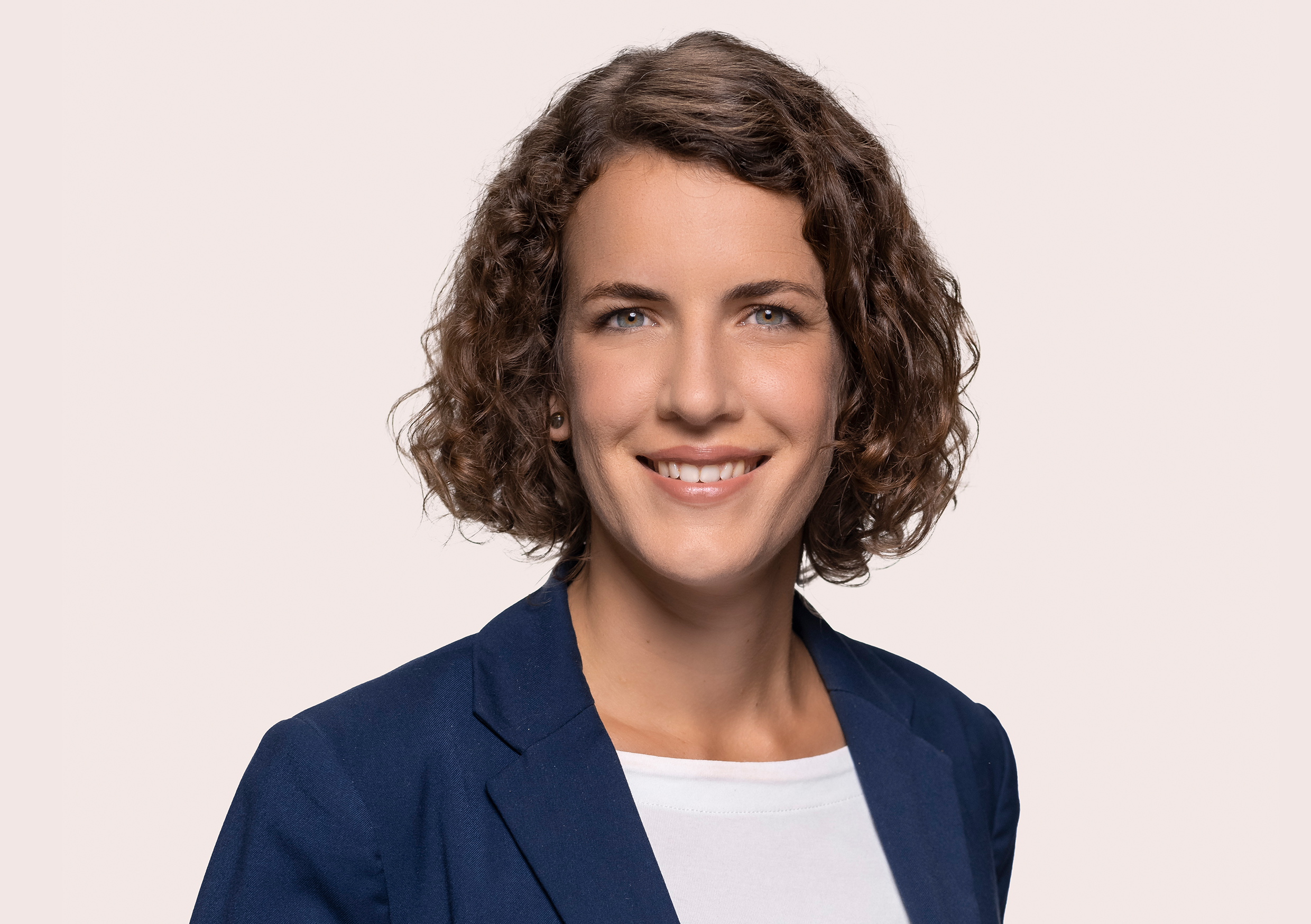

Member of the Bundestag
- Incumbent
- Assumed office 2021

Personal details
- Born: 3 June 1989 (age 37) Lörrach, West Germany
- Party: SPD
- Education: University of Konstanz; Sciences Po; University of St. Gallen

Lina Seitzl (born 3 June 1989) is a German politician of the Social Democratic Party (SPD) who has been serving as a member of the Bundestag since 2021.

== Early life and education ==
Seitzl was born in 1989 in the West German town of Lörrach. From 2009 to 2015, she studied political science and administration at the University of Konstanz and Sciences Po.

== Political career ==
From 2016 to 2021, Seitzl served as chair of the SPD in Konstanz.

Seitzl became a member of the Bundestag in the 2021 elections, representing the Konstanz district.

In parliament, Seitzl has been serving on the Committee on Education, Research and Technology Assessment (since 2022) and the Committee on Health (since 2025). From 2022 to 2025, she was also a member of the Committee on the Environment, Nature Conservation, Nuclear Safety and Consumer Protection and the Subcommittee on Global Health.

In addition to her committee assignments, Seitzl is part of the German-Swiss Parliamentary Friendship Group. She has also been a member of the German delegation to the Franco-German Parliamentary Assembly.

== Other activities ==
- German United Services Trade Union (ver.di), Member
