= Josef Schüttler =

German politician

Minister for Social Affairs of Baden-Württemberg
- In office 23 June 1960 – 12 June 1968
- Minister-President: Kurt Georg Kiesinger; Hans Filbinger
- Preceded by: Ermin Hohlwegler
- Succeeded by: Walter Hirrlinger

Member of the Bundestag; for Konstanz
- In office 7 September 1949 – 17 October 1961
- Preceded by: Constituency established
- Succeeded by: Hermann Biechele

Personal details
- Born: 11 December 1902 Bad Fredeburg, Germany
- Died: 7 October 1972 (aged 69) Singen, West Germany
- Party: Christian Democratic Union
- Children: 3

Josef Schüttler (11 December 1902 – 7 October 1972) was a German politician of the Christian Democratic Union (CDU) and former member of the German Bundestag.

== Life ==
From 1946 he sat for four years in the constituent state assembly and in the state parliament of South Baden. In 1949, as in 1953 and 1957, he was elected directly to the German Bundestag for the constituency of Constance, of which he was a member until 1961.

== Literature ==
Herbst, Ludolf; Jahn, Bruno (2002). Vierhaus, Rudolf (ed.). Biographisches Handbuch der Mitglieder des Deutschen Bundestages. 1949–2002 [Biographical Handbook of the Members of the German Bundestag. 1949–2002] (in German). München: De Gruyter - De Gruyter Saur. p. 1715. ISBN 978-3-11-184511-1.
