= Antje Tillmann =

German politician

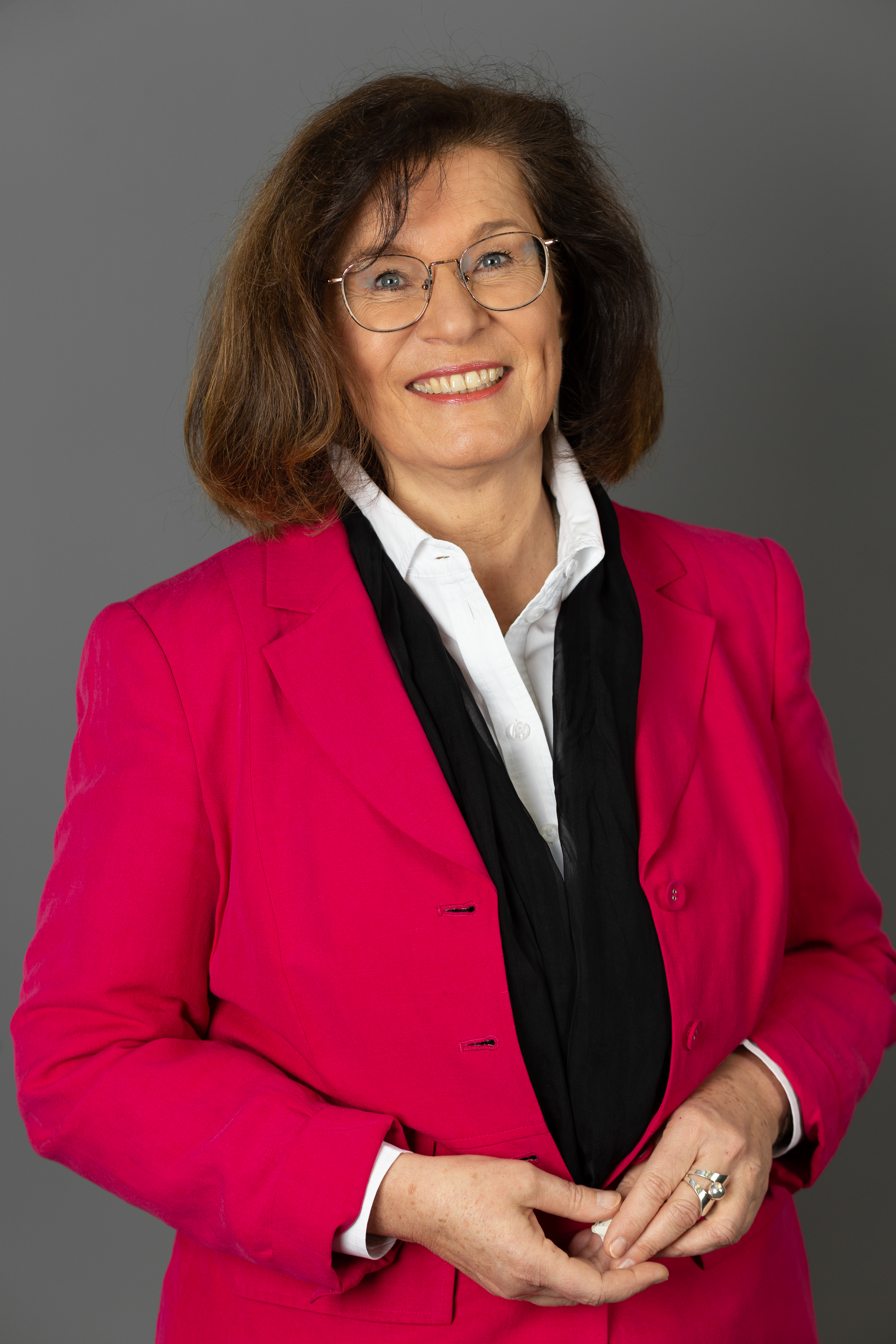
- Antje Tillmann in 2020

Member of the Bundestag
- In office 2002–2025

Personal details
- Born: 18 August 1964 (age 62) Düsseldorf, West Germany (now Germany)
- Party: CDU
- Children: 1
- Education: Fachhochschule für Finanzen (Nordkirchen)
- Occupation: Politician

Antje Tillmann (born 18 August 1964 in Düsseldorf) is a German politician of the Christian Democratic Union (CDU) who served as a member of the Bundestag from the state of Thuringia from 2002 to 2025.

== Early life ==
After graduating from high school in 1983, Tillmann studied finance at the University of Applied Sciences for Finance in Nordkirchen, which she completed in 1986 with a degree in finance. She then worked as a tax official in North Rhine-Westphalia. In 1991, she moved to Brandenburg, where she participated in the establishment of the University of Applied Sciences for Finance in Königs Wusterhausen. In 1993, she finally went to Thuringia and worked in the Ministry of Finance there. In 1998, she passed the examination to become a tax consultant.

Tillmann is Roman Catholic, divorced, and has one daughter.

== Political career ==
Tillmann first became a member of the Bundestag in the 2002 German federal election. She was a member of the Budget Committee until moving to the Finance Committee in 2005. In this capacity, she served as her parliamentary group's rapporteur on the introduction of a balanced budget amendment in 2009.

In the negotiations to form Chancellor Angela Merkel’s fourth coalition government following the 2017 federal elections, Tillmann was part of the working group on financial policies and taxes, led by Peter Altmaier, Andreas Scheuer and Olaf Scholz.

Together with Roland Heintze, Daniel Günther, Andreas Jung, David McAllister, Nadine Schön and Oliver Wittke, Tillmann co-chaired the CDU's 2018 national convention in Hamburg.

== Other activities ==
- German Red Cross (DRK), Member
- Federal Agency for Civic Education (BPB), Alternate Member of the board of trustees (2005-2011)

== Political positions ==
In June 2017, Tillmann voted against her parliamentary group's majority and in favor of Germany's introduction of same-sex marriage.

In September 2020, Tillmann was one of 15 members of her parliamentary group who joined Norbert Röttgen in writing an open letter to Minister of the Interior Horst Seehofer which called on Germany and other EU counties to take in 5000 immigrants who were left without shelter after fires gutted the overcrowded Mória Reception and Identification Centre on the Greek island of Lesbos.
