= Michael Hose =

German politician (born 1984)

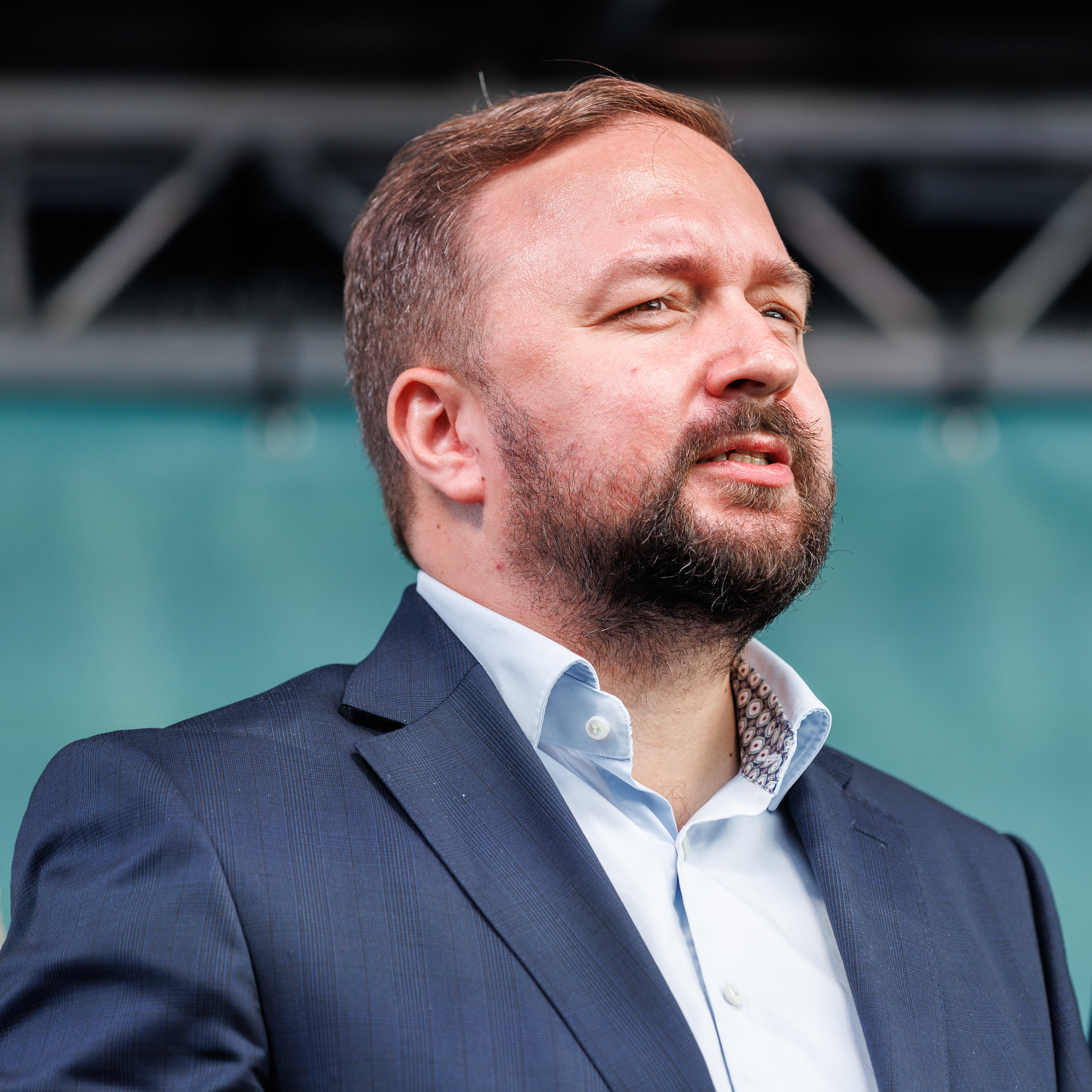
- Hose in 2024

Member of the Bundestag
- Incumbent
- Assumed office 25 March 2025
- Constituency: Thuringia

Personal details
- Born: 28 September 1984 (age 41)
- Party: Christian Democratic Union

Michael Hose (born 28 September 1984) is a German politician who was elected as a member of the Bundestag in 2025. He has served as chairman of the Christian Democratic Union in the city council of Erfurt since 2019.
