= Peter Friedrich =

German politician (born 1972)

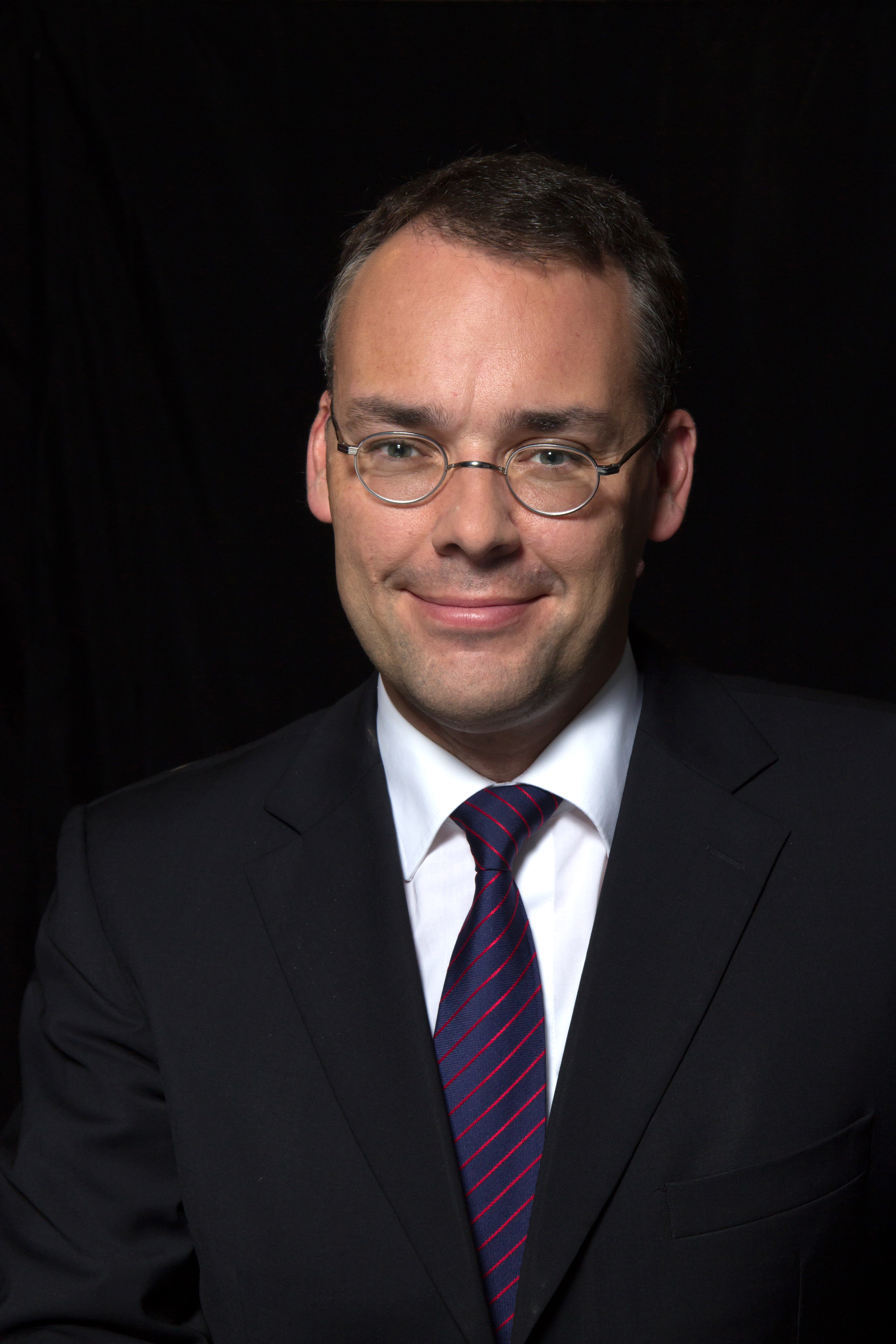
- Friedrich in 2013

Member of the Bundestag
- In office 18 October 2005 – 21 May 2011
- Succeeded by: Stefan Rebmann
- Constituency: Baden-Württemberg

Personal details
- Born: 6 May 1972 (age 53) Karlsruhe
- Party: Social Democratic Party (since 1990)

Peter Friedrich (born 6 May 1972 in Karlsruhe) is a German politician. From 2005 to 2011, he was a member of the Bundestag. From 2011 to 2016, he served as minister of federal, European and international affairs of Baden-Württemberg, and as representative of the state government to the federal government.
