= Katja Kipping =

German politician

Katja Kipping Senator a.D. MdL a.D. MdB a.D.
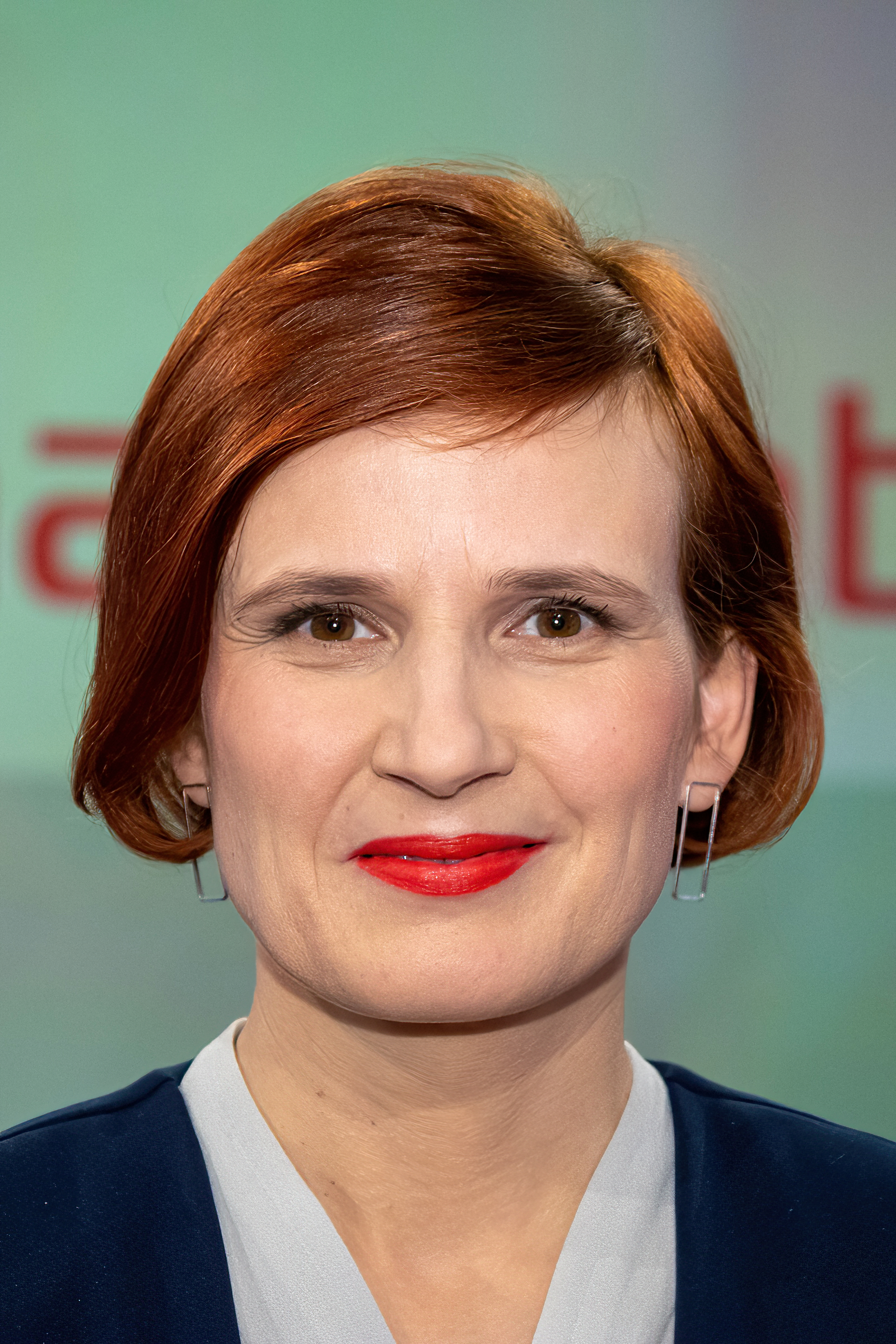
- Kipping in 2019

Senator for Integration, Labour and Social Affairs of Berlin
- In office 21 December 2021 – 27 April 2023
- Governing Mayor: Franziska Giffey
- Preceded by: Elke Breitenbach
- Succeeded by: Cansel Kiziltepe

Leader of The Left
- In office 2 June 2012 – 27 February 2021 Serving with Bernd Riexinger
- Preceded by: Gesine Lötzsch
- Succeeded by: Janine Wissler
Parliamentary constituencies
Member of the Bundestag for Saxony
In office 18 October 2005 – 3 January 2022
| Preceded by | multi-member district |
| Succeeded by | Clara Bünger |
| Constituency | The Left List |
Member of the Landtag of Saxony
In office 13 October 1999 – 31 October 2005
| Preceded by | multi-member district |
| Succeeded by | Monika Runge |
| Constituency | The Left List |
Member of the City Council of Dresden
In office April 1999 – December 2003
| Preceded by | multi-member district |
| Succeeded by | multi-member district |

Personal details
- Born: 18 January 1978 (age 48) Dresden, East Germany
- Party: The Left (2007–)
- Other political affiliations: Party of Democratic Socialism (1998–2007)
- Children: 1
- Education: Dresden University of Technology
- Occupation: Politician
- Website: katja-kipping.de

Katja Kipping (born 18 January 1978) is a German politician of The Left party. She was a member of the Bundestag representing Saxony from 2005 to 2021, a federal co-leader of The Left from 2012 to 2021 alongside Bernd Riexinger, and the Senator for Integration, Labour and Social Affairs in the Berlin state government from December 2021 to April 2023.

== Early life and career ==
Kipping was born on 18 January 1978 in Dresden, then part of East Germany (GDR). After completing her Abitur in 1996 at Annen-Gymnasium, Kipping spent a voluntary social year in Gatchina, Russia. Following this, she completed a degree in Slavic studies, with a minor in American studies and public law, at the Dresden University of Technology, from which she obtained her Master of Arts degree in 2003. In her final thesis, she examined the mutual relationship between literature and politics. During her studies, she shared an apartment with four other students.

Kipping is living in Berlin and Dresden. She married political scientist Kolja Müller in 2011, and has a daughter. She is a volunteer swimming instructor with the DLRG Berlin.

== Political career ==
At the start of her studies at the Dresden University of Technology, Kipping was heavily involved with the so-called Protestbüro (bureau of protest). She was speaker for the protest groups Red Tree and Green League. In 1998, she became a member of the Party of Democratic Socialism (PDS). She was elected to the city council of Dresden, capital of Saxony, serving from 1999 to 2003. She was elected to the Landtag of Saxony for the PDS in the 1999 state election, and served until the 2004 election. During this time, she was the youngest member of parliament, elected at 21 years old. She became party spokesperson for traffic and energy policy. In July 2003, she became co-deputy leader of the PDS, focusing on the party's social agenda and contact with social movements.

Kipping was a chief representative of the young progressive generation who sought to renew the party and place emphasis on environmentalism, social justice, and social movements. She was a principal proponent of a united left party, comprising the east-oriented PDS and the west-oriented Labour and Social Justice (WASG). The two parties formed a joint list for the 2005 federal election, and Kipping was elected to the Bundestag as a representative for Saxony. The PDS and WASG merged to form The Left in June 2007, and Kipping was elected deputy chairperson of the new party. She was re-elected to the Bundestag in 2009 and became chairwoman of the Committee for Labour and Social Affairs.

In May 2009, she co-founded the Emancipatory Left, a faction within The Left which demands "socialism and freedom", alongside Caren Lay and Julia Bonk. The previous year, Kipping had become editor of the left-wing magazine Prague Spring, which became the faction's primary publication.

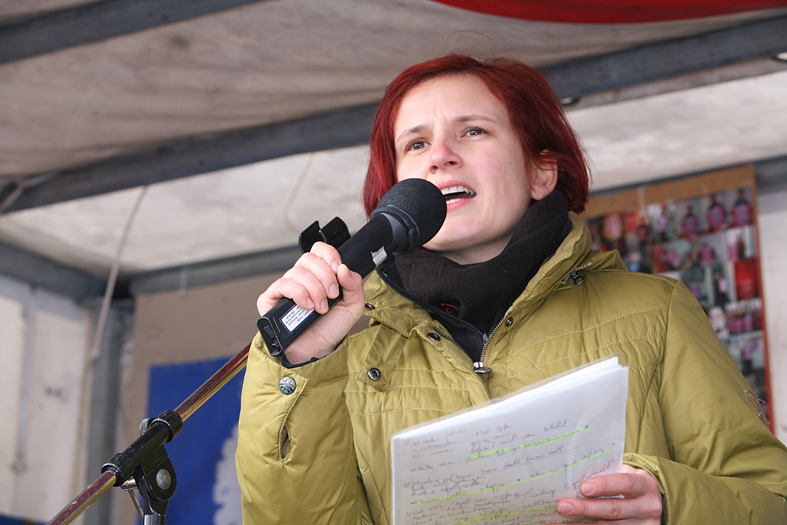
Kipping at an anti-fascist demonstration in Dresden in 2010

In January 2012, Der Spiegel reported that Kipping was one of 27 members of The Left's parliamentary group who were under surveillance by the Federal Office for the Protection of the Constitution (Verfassungsschutz).

=== Federal co-leader ===
On 2 June 2012, Kipping was elected as one of The Left's two chairpersons, winning 67% of votes at the federal party congress. Her counterpart was Bernd Riexinger.

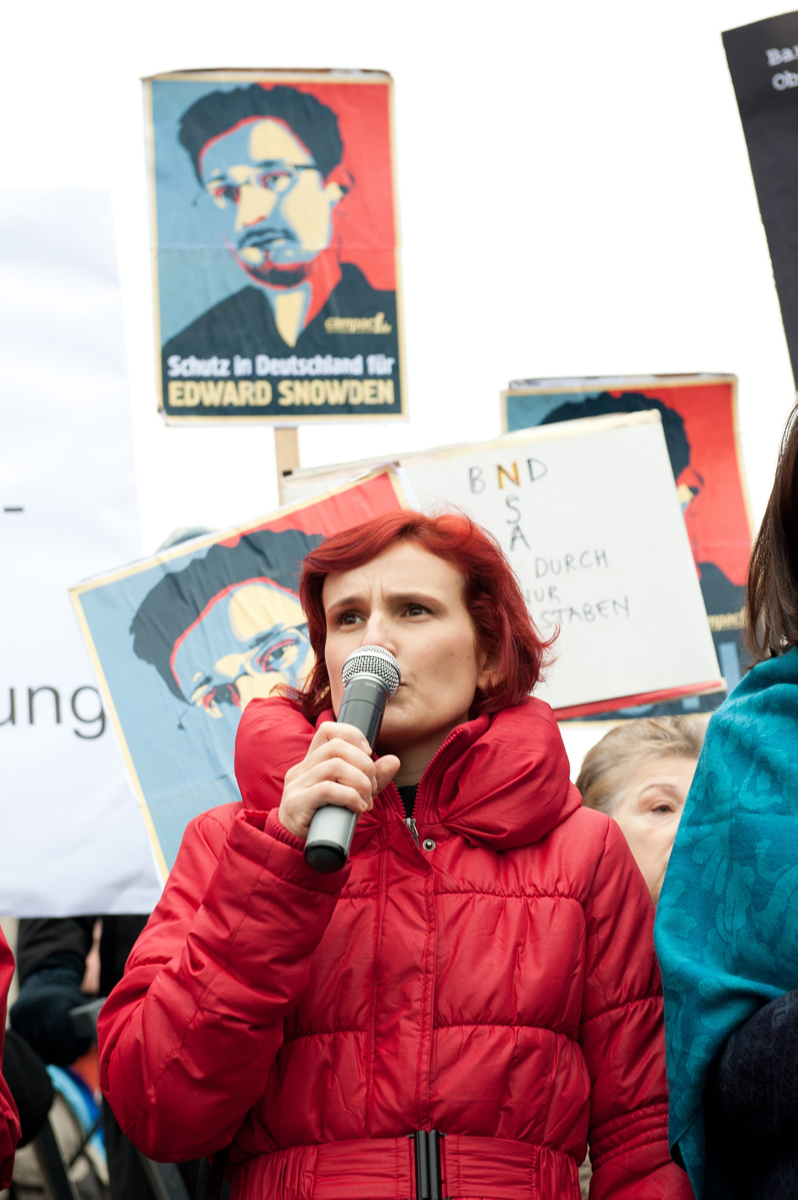
Kipping speaking at a protest in support of Edward Snowden in Berlin in 2013

In the Bundestag, Kipping was The Left's spokesperson for social affairs and a strong opponent of the Hartz IV program. She has long advocated its repeal and the implementation of universal basic income; she was spokeswoman for the Basic Income Network from 2004 to 2008. She also calls for the reduction of the work week from five days to four. From November 2009 to September 2012, she chaired the Bundestag's Committee on Labour and Social Affairs.

During the European refugee crisis, Kipping supported the federal government's decision to keep the borders open for refugees. She advocated for reform of immigration law to permit quicker and easier naturalisation, and for a "new social contract" to facilitate easier movement, guarantees of individual rights and social security for all.

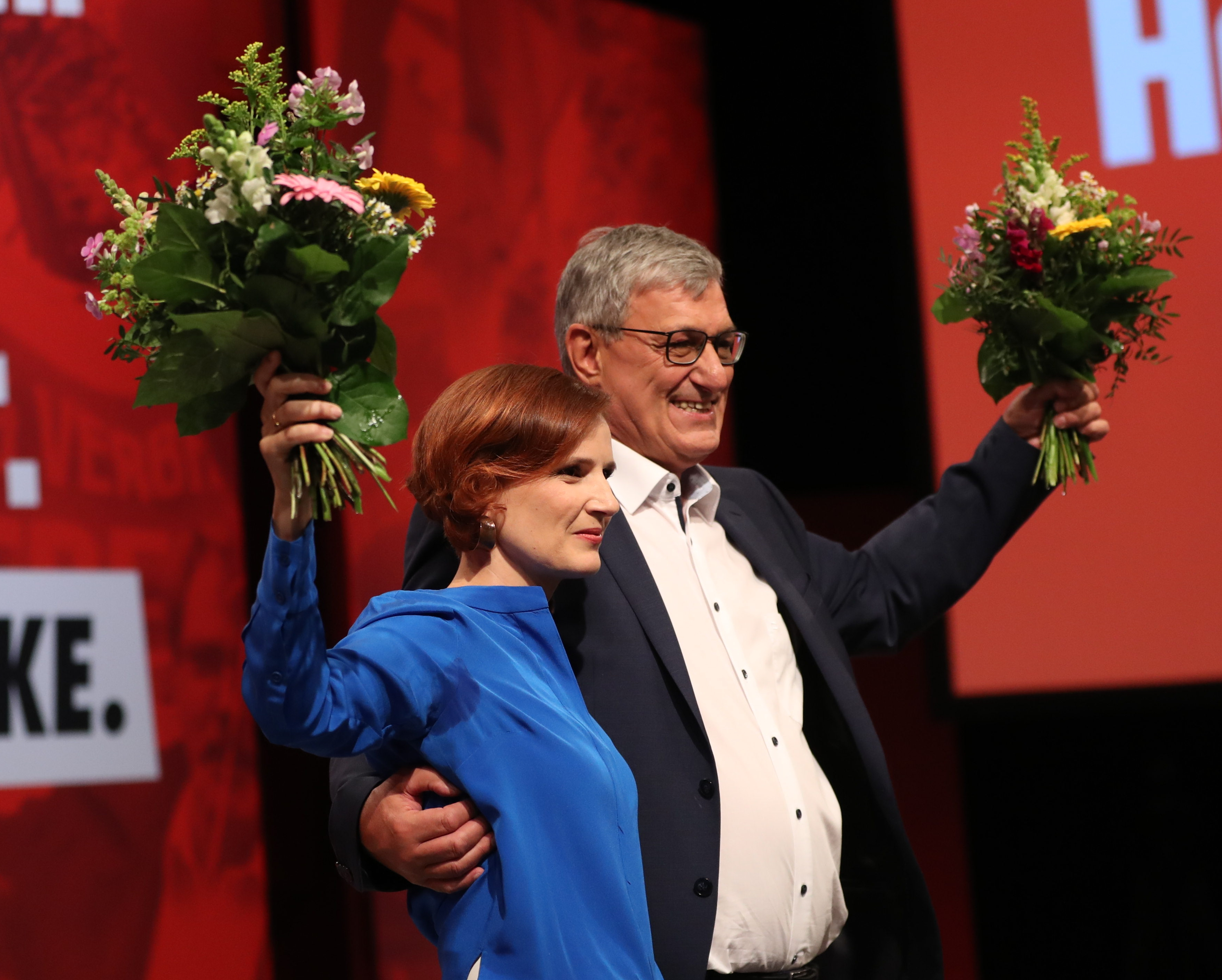
Kipping with Bernd Riexinger at the 2018 Left party congress

In her book New Left Majorities: An Invitation, Kipping calls for an economic realignment towards what she terms the "economy of commons", which would prioritise the interests of the citizens over profits. She advocates for reintroducing the concept of the commons, particularly in digital technology, enabling people to work cooperatively for the common good, and allowing increased productivity to ease the burden on workers. The second pillar is "infrastructure socialism", whereby fulfilling the needs of the population would be a key focus of both national and local decision-making. Access to healthcare, housing, and transportation would be guaranteed, among other things.

Kipping has repeatedly spoken in favour of The Left's involvement in government with the Social Democratic Party (SPD) and The Greens. In a March 2019 article published in Die Welt, she called for the centre-left parties to join The Left in a coalition committed to socio-economic reform away from what she described as a neoliberal consensus exemplified by the Agenda 2010. She pointed to the Berlin government's attitude toward the city's housing crisis as an example to follow, and praised the initiative for a referendum to expropriate large real estate companies. Noting the popularity of right-wing protest parties alongside broad support for progressive social and ecological policies, Kipping suggested that voters are dissatisfied with an insufficiently ambitious left. In her view, a left-wing majority could be achieved through a bold platform committed to social and economic transformation.

In Bundestag elections, Kipping served as The Left's candidate in Dresden I in elections from 2005 to 2021, placing either second or third each time. Her best performance was 25.0% in the 2013 election. In the 2017 election, Kipping placed third with 21.0% behind AfD candidate Jens Maier (22.4%) and CDU incumbent Andreas Lämmel (24.6%). In 2021, in light of Lämmel's retirement and the declining popularity of the CDU, Kipping campaigned for SPD and Greens supporters to tactically support her candidacy to prevent Maier from winning. She was backed by the Campact movement. The CDU ultimately held the seat with their candidate Markus Reichel, who won 21.1% of votes. Kipping placed second on 18.9%, 92 votes ahead of Maier (18.8%). Despite the loss, Kipping was optimistic about her performance compared to The Left's overall popularity; the party list received only 10.5% in the constituency. The close result also made the seat a potential target for The Left in future elections given their narrow margin of entry into the Bundestag.

In August 2020, Kipping and Riexinger announced they would step down as co-chairs in accordance with party regulations stating that no position should be held by the same person for more than eight years. The party congress due to elect their successors was scheduled for October/November 2020, but was delayed due to the worsening of the COVID-19 pandemic in Germany. It ultimately took place digitally in February 2021. Kipping, as the designated female co-chair, was succeeded by Janine Wissler; Riexinger was succeeded by Susanne Hennig-Wellsow.

=== Senator of Berlin ===
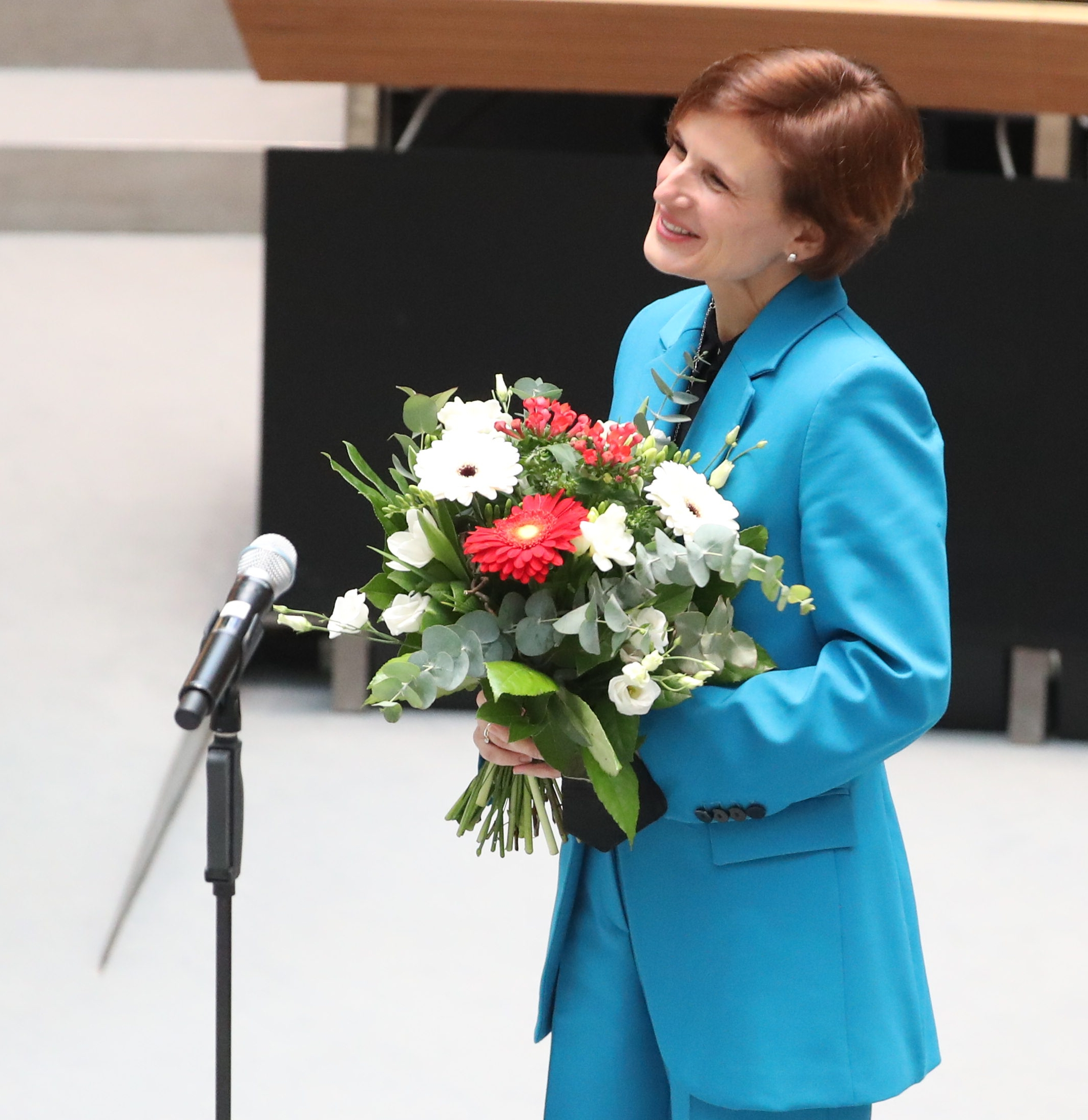
Kipping at the swearing-in of the Giffey senate in 2021

On 2 December 2021, during the government formation following the 2021 Berlin state election, the Berlin association of The Left announced that Katja Kipping would replace fellow Left politician Elke Breitenbach as Senator for Integration, Labour, and Social Affairs in the Giffey senate. She was sworn in on 21 December 2021 and served until the Giffey senate left office on 27 April 2023 after the 2023 Berlin repeat state election.

== Social affiliations ==
In December 2007, Kipping joined members of the Bundestag and Saxon Landtag for a demonstration in support of Rote Hilfe e. V. (Red Aid), a far-left prisoner support group. Kipping left Rote Hilfe in March 2009.

Kipping is a founding member and board member of the Institute of Solidary Modernity, a left-oriented think tank founded in 2010 which aims to unite the progressive partys (SPD, A90/Greens and The Left) in Germany to establish an common left policy.

== Publications ==
- Christine Buchholz u. Katja Kipping (Hrsg.): G8 - Gipfel der Ungerechtigkeit. VSA, 2006, ISBN 3-89965-200-2.
- Ausverkauf der Politik – Für einen demokratischen Aufbruch. Econ, 2009, ISBN 978-3-430-20079-0.
- Wer flüchtetet schon freiwillig? Die Verantwortung des Westens oder Warum sich unsere Gesellschaft neu erfinden muss. Westend Verlag, Frankfurt 2016, ISBN 978-3864891335.
