= Dresden I =

Federal electoral district of Germany

158 Dresden I
- Electoral district for the Bundestag
- Dresden I in 2025
- State: Saxony
- Population: 302,100 (2019)
- Electorate: 228,643 (2021)
- Major settlements: Dresden (partial)
- Area: 81.5 km^{2}

Current electoral district
- Created: 1990
- Party: AfD
- Member: Thomas Ladzinski
- Elected: 2025

Dresden I is an electoral constituency (German: Wahlkreis) represented in the Bundestag. It elects one member via first-past-the-post voting. Under the current constituency numbering system, it is designated as constituency 158. It is located in central Saxony, comprising the southern part of the city of Dresden.

Dresden I was created for the inaugural 1990 federal election after German reunification. From 2021 to 2025, it was represented by Markus Reichel of the Christian Democratic Union (CDU). Since 2025 it has been represented by Thomas Ladzinski of the AfD.

== Geography ==
Dresden I is located in central Saxony. As of the 2021 federal election, it comprises the Ortsamtsbereiche of Altstadt, Blasewitz, Leuben, Plauen, and Prohlis from the independent city of Dresden.

== History ==
Dresden I was created after German reunification in 1990. In the 1990 through 1998 elections, it was constituency 318 in the numbering system. In the 2002 through 2009 elections, it was number 160. In the 2013 through 2021 elections, it was number 159. From the 2025 election, it has been number 158.

Originally, the constituency comprised the Stadtbezirke of Ost and Süd from the city of Dresden. It acquired its current borders in the 2002 election.

Election	No.	Name	Borders
1990	318	Dresden I	Dresden city (only Ost and Süd Stadtbezirke)
1994	318	Dresden I	Dresden city (only Ost and Süd Stadtbezirke)
1998	318	Dresden I	Dresden city (only Ost and Süd Stadtbezirke)
2002	160	Dresden I	Dresden city (only Altstadt, Blasewitz, Leuben, Plauen, and Prohlis Ortsamtsbereiche)
2005	160	Dresden I	Dresden city (only Altstadt, Blasewitz, Leuben, Plauen, and Prohlis Ortsamtsbereiche)
2009	160	Dresden I	Dresden city (only Altstadt, Blasewitz, Leuben, Plauen, and Prohlis Ortsamtsbereiche)
2013	159	Dresden I	Dresden city (only Altstadt, Blasewitz, Leuben, Plauen, and Prohlis Ortsamtsbereiche)
2017	159	Dresden I	Dresden city (only Altstadt, Blasewitz, Leuben, Plauen, and Prohlis Ortsamtsbereiche)
2021	159	Dresden I	Dresden city (only Altstadt, Blasewitz, Leuben, Plauen, and Prohlis Ortsamtsbereiche)
2025	158	Dresden I	Dresden city (only Altstadt, Blasewitz, Leuben, Plauen, and Prohlis Ortsamtsbereiche)

== Members ==
The constituency was first represented by Hans Geisler of the Christian Democratic Union (CDU) from 1990 to 1994, when he was succeeded by Christa Reichard from 1994 to 2005. Andreas Lämmel was elected in 2005, and re-elected in 2009, 2013, and 2017. He was succeeded by Markus Reichel in 2021.

Election	Member	Party	%
1990	Hans Geisler	CDU	48.9
1994	Christa Reichard	CDU	47.7
1998	Christa Reichard	CDU	38.2
2002	Christa Reichard	CDU	33.8
2005	Andreas Lämmel	CDU	37.0
2009	Andreas Lämmel	CDU	36.6
2013	Andreas Lämmel	CDU	42.6
2017	Andreas Lämmel	CDU	24.6
2021	Markus Reichel	CDU	21.1
2025	Thomas Ladzinski	AfD	29.4

== Election results ==
=== 2025 election ===
Federal election (2025): Dresden I
Notes:	Blue background denotes the winner of the electorate vote. Pink background denotes a candidate elected from their party list. Yellow background denotes an electorate win by a list member, or other incumbent. A ✓ or ✗ denotes status of any incumbent, win or lose respectively.						
Party	Candidate	Votes	%	±%	Party votes	%	±%
AfD	Thomas Ladzinski	53,853	29.4	▲10.6	50,387	27.4	▲9.5
CDU	✗ Markus Reichel	50,040	27.3	▲6.3	36,585	19.9	▲4.5
Left	Funda Römer	26,086	14.2	▼4.6	25,444	13.8	▲3.3
SPD	Rasha Nasr	21,456	11.7	▼2.9	18,241	9.9	▼9.1
Greens	Kassem Taher Saleh	19,898	10.9	▲1.3	22,544	12.2	▼3.0
BSW					15,470	8.4	New
FDP	Torsten Herbst	6,230	3.4	▼6.9	7,082	3.8	▼8.4
Volt	Terence Koch	3,482	1.9	New	2,269	1.2	▲0.7
Tierschutzpartei					1,960	1.1	▼0.6
FW					1,507	0.8	▼0.8
PARTEI					1,130	0.6	▼0.8
BD	Frank Anton	2,020	1.1	New	679	0.4	New
Pirates					451	0.2	▼0.5
Humanists					234	0.1	▼0.1
MLPD					87	<0.1	0.0
Informal votes		1,857			852		
Total valid votes		183,065			184,070		
Turnout		184,922	82.1	▲2.9			
AfD gain from CDU	Majority	3,813	2.1	N/A			

=== 2021 election ===
Federal election (2021): Dresden I
Notes:	Blue background denotes the winner of the electorate vote. Pink background denotes a candidate elected from their party list. Yellow background denotes an electorate win by a list member, or other incumbent. A ✓ or ✗ denotes status of any incumbent, win or lose respectively.						
Party	Candidate	Votes	%	±%	Party votes	%	±%
CDU	Markus Reichel	37,811	21.1	▼3.5	27,710	15.4	▼8.9
Left	Katja Kipping	33,872	18.9	▼2.1	18,910	10.5	▼6.6
AfD	Jens Maier	33,780	18.8	▼3.5	32,122	17.9	▼5.2
SPD	Rasha Nasr	26,271	14.6	▲1.4	34,125	19.0	▲8.4
FDP	Torsten Herbst	18,588	10.4	▲2.8	21,989	12.2	▲2.0
Greens	Kassem Taher Saleh	17,137	9.5	▲3.0	27,369	15.2	▲7.5
Tierschutzpartei					3,014	1.7	▲0.5
FW					2,967	1.7	▲0.9
PARTEI	Robert Küttner	3,684	2.1	0.0	2,568	1.4	▼0.2
dieBasis	Constanze Grottker	2,527	1.4		2,645	1.5	
Pirates	Stephanie Henkel	2,011	1.1	▲0.1	1,313	0.7	▲0.1
Volt					928	0.5	
Gesundheitsforschung					815	0.5	
Team Todenhöfer					769	0.4	
ÖDP	Markus Peter Taubert	1,164	0.6	▼0.2	760	0.4	▼0.1
Humanists	Robert Ritter	763	0.4		495	0.3	
Independent	Marcus Fuchs	631	0.4				
Independent	Lothar Häupl	600	0.3				
Bündnis C	Janko Vieweg	477	0.3		359	0.2	
NPD					305	0.2	▼0.5
V-Partei3					177	0.1	▼0.1
The III. Path					150	0.1	
MLPD	Andrea Ebert	227	0.1		130	0.1	0.0
DKP					106	0.1	
Informal votes		1,577			1,394		
Total valid votes		179,543			179,726		
Turnout		181,120	79.2	▲0.6			
CDU hold	Majority	3,939	2.2	0.0			

=== 2017 election ===
Federal election (2017): Dresden I
Notes:	Blue background denotes the winner of the electorate vote. Pink background denotes a candidate elected from their party list. Yellow background denotes an electorate win by a list member, or other incumbent. A ✓ or ✗ denotes status of any incumbent, win or lose respectively.						
Party	Candidate	Votes	%	±%	Party votes	%	±%
CDU	✓ Andreas Lämmel	44,388	24.6	▼18.0	44,104	24.4	▼15.5
AfD	Jens Maier	40,380	22.4		41,812	23.1	▲16.2
Left	Katja Kipping	37,936	21.0	▼4.0	31,004	17.1	▼1.9
SPD	Christian Avenarius	23,906	13.2	▼1.6	19,246	10.6	▼4.8
FDP	Robert Malorny	13,590	7.5	▲5.6	18,610	10.3	▲7.2
Greens	Thomas Löser	11,765	6.5	▲0.4	13,936	7.7	▼0.2
PARTEI	Sören Tobias Hinze	3,680	2.0		3,022	1.7	
Tierschutzpartei					2,203	1.2	
FW					1,371	0.8	▼0.7
Pirates	Jörg Smuda	1,861	1.0	▼2.0	1,209	0.7	▼2.9
ÖDP	Joachim Guzy	1,481	0.8		1,002	0.6	
NPD	Dietmar Grahl	991	0.5	▼2.5	1,284	0.7	▼1.6
BGE					811	0.4	
DiB					700	0.4	
V-Partei³					329	0.2	
BüSo	Michael Gründler	669	0.4	▼0.3	320	0.2	▼0.1
MLPD					155	0.1	0.0
Informal votes		2,202			1,731		
Total valid votes		180,647			181,118		
Turnout		182,849	78.6	▲4.4			
CDU hold	Majority	4,008	2.2	▼15.4			

=== 2013 election ===
Federal election (2013): Dresden I
Notes:	Blue background denotes the winner of the electorate vote. Pink background denotes a candidate elected from their party list. Yellow background denotes an electorate win by a list member, or other incumbent. A ✓ or ✗ denotes status of any incumbent, win or lose respectively.						
Party	Candidate	Votes	%	±%	Party votes	%	±%
CDU	✓ Andreas Lämmel	72,537	42.6	▲6.0	68,192	39.8	▲5.6
Left	Katja Kipping	42,599	25.0	▲1.1	32,505	19.0	▼3.0
SPD	Ines Vogel	25,321	14.9	▼1.9	26,440	15.4	▼0.2
AfD					11,814	6.9	
Greens	Ulrike Bürgel	10,429	6.1	▼2.7	13,517	7.9	▼3.0
Pirates	Sebastian Harmel	5,217	3.1		6,086	3.6	
NPD	Frank Hartmut Krien	5,196	3.0	▲0.6	3,888	2.3	▼0.3
FW	Joachim Guzy	4,316	2.5		2,413	1.4	
FDP	Johannes Lohmeyer	3,305	1.9	▼7.6	5,243	3.1	▼10.2
BüSo	Michael Gründler	1,180	0.7	▼0.3	457	0.3	▼0.7
PRO					402	0.2	
Independent	Werner Klawun	265	0.2				
MLPD					179	0.1	▼0.1
Informal votes		2,802			2,031		
Total valid votes		170,365			171,136		
Turnout		173,167	74.2	▲6.0			
CDU hold	Majority	29,938	17.6	▲5.0			

=== 2009 election ===
Federal election (2009): Dresden I
Notes:	Blue background denotes the winner of the electorate vote. Pink background denotes a candidate elected from their party list. Yellow background denotes an electorate win by a list member, or other incumbent. A ✓ or ✗ denotes status of any incumbent, win or lose respectively.						
Party	Candidate	Votes	%	±%	Party votes	%	±%
CDU	✓ Andreas Lämmel	56,749	36.6	▼0.4	53,247	34.3	▲9.9
Left	Katja Kipping	37,180	24.0	▲4.7	34,171	22.0	▲2.2
SPD	Marlies Volkmer	25,959	16.7	▼15.4	24,373	15.7	▼12.2
FDP	Johannes Lohmeyer	14,818	9.5	▲4.8	20,574	13.2	▼3.4
Greens	Dietrich Herrmann	13,668	8.8	▲4.9	16,961	10.9	▲3.8
NPD	Brigitte Lauterbach	3,851	2.5	▲0.1	3,980	2.6	0.0
BüSo	Marcus Kührt	1,575	1.0	▲0.4	1,563	1.0	▲0.6
Independent	Hartmut Richter	801	0.5				
Independent	Gotthard Häupl	612	0.4				
MLPD					297	0.2	▲0.1
REP					281	0.2	▼0.1
Informal votes		2,007			1,773		
Total valid votes		155,213			155,447		
Turnout		157,220	68.2	▼4.1			
CDU hold	Majority	19,569	12.6	▲7.7			

=== 2005 election ===
Due to the death of NPD candidate Kerstin Lorenz, voting in Dresden I was delayed for two weeks, taking place on 2 October 2005.

Federal election (2005): Dresden I
Notes:	Blue background denotes the winner of the electorate vote. Pink background denotes a candidate elected from their party list. Yellow background denotes an electorate win by a list member, or other incumbent. A ✓ or ✗ denotes status of any incumbent, win or lose respectively.						
Party	Candidate	Votes	%	±%	Party votes	%	±%
CDU	Andreas Lämmel	57,925	37.0	▲3.2	38,202	24.4	▼6.1
SPD	Marlies Volkmer	50,314	32.1	▲0.9	43,726	27.9	▼4.9
Left	Katja Kipping	30,113	19.2	▼1.6	30,907	19.7	▲2.0
FDP	Peggy Bellmann	7,365	4.7	▼0.8	26,034	16.6	▲9.6
Greens	Stephan Kühn	6,156	3.9	▼1.6	11,108	7.1	▼0.8
NPD	Franz Schönhuber	3,776	2.4		4,010	2.6	▲1.8
AGFG					895	0.6	
BüSo	Katarzyna Kruczkowski	938	0.6		693	0.4	▲0.1
PBC					435	0.3	0.0
REP					196	0.1	▼0.6
SGP					196	0.1	
MLPD					147	0.1	
Informal votes		1,850			1,888		
Total valid votes		156,587			156,549		
Turnout		158,437	72.3	▼3.7			
CDU hold	Majority	7,611	4.9	▲2.4			

=== 2002 election ===
Federal election (2002): Dresden I
Notes:	Blue background denotes the winner of the electorate vote. Pink background denotes a candidate elected from their party list. Yellow background denotes an electorate win by a list member, or other incumbent. A ✓ or ✗ denotes status of any incumbent, win or lose respectively.						
Party	Candidate	Votes	%	±%	Party votes	%	±%
CDU	✓ Christa Reichard	54,939	33.8		49,385	30.5	
SPD	Marlies Volkmer	50,815	31.3		53,336	32.9	
PDS	Christine Ostrowski	33,915	20.9		28,776	17.7	
Greens	Antje Hermenau	9,000	5.5		12,776	7.9	
FDP	Ingo Liermann	8,968	5.5		11,419	7.0	
Schill					1,845	1.1	
GRAUEN	Joachim Wauer	1,791	1.1		1,394	0.9	
Independent	Horst Oertel	1,759	1.1				
NPD					1,267	0.8	
REP					1,084	0.7	
Independent	Gerald Herrmann	772	0.5				
BüSo	Ronny Leibelt	571	0.4		510	0.3	
PBC					407	0.3	
Informal votes		2,394			2,725		
Total valid votes		162,530			162,199		
Turnout		164,924	75.9				
CDU hold	Majority	4,124	2.5				
