= Erzgebirgskreis I =

Federal electoral district of Germany

163 Erzgebirgskreis I
- Electoral district for the Bundestag
- Erzgebirgskreis I in 2025
- State: Saxony
- Population: 256,600 (2019)
- Electorate: 210,941 (2021)
- Major settlements: Aue-Bad Schlema; Annaberg-Buchholz; Marienberg
- Area: 1,560.9 km^{2}

Current electoral district
- Created: 2009
- Party: AfD
- Member: Thomas Dietz
- Elected: 2021, 2025

Erzgebirgskreis I is an electoral constituency (German: Wahlkreis) represented in the Bundestag. It elects one member via first-past-the-post voting. Under the current constituency numbering system, it is designated as constituency 163. It is located in southwestern Saxony, comprising most of the Erzgebirgskreis district.

Erzgebirgskreis I was created for the 2009 federal election. Since 2021, it has been represented by Thomas Dietz of Alternative for Germany (AfD).

== Geography ==
Erzgebirgskreis I is located in southwestern Saxony. As of the 2021 federal election, it comprises the entirety of the Erzgebirgskreis district excluding the municipalities of Hohndorf, Jahnsdorf, Neukirchen, Oelsnitz, Thalheim, and Zwönitz and the Verwaltungsgemeinschaften of Burkhardtsdorf, Lugau, and Stollberg.

== History ==
Erzgebirgskreis I was created in 2009 and contained parts of the abolished constituencies of Bundestagswahlkreis Freiberg – Mittlerer Erzgebirgskreis and Annaberg – Aue-Schwarzenberg. In the 2009 election, it was constituency 165 in the numbering system. In the 2013 through 2021 elections, it was number 164. From the 2025 election, it has been number 163. Its borders have not changed since its creation.

== Members ==
The constituency was first represented by Günter Baumann of the Christian Democratic Union (CDU) from 2009 to 2017. He was succeeded by Alexander Krauß in 2017. Thomas Dietz won the constituency for the Alternative for Germany (AfD) in 2021.

Election	Member	Party	%
2009	Günter Baumann	CDU	40.3
2013	Günter Baumann	CDU	50.2
2017	Alexander Krauß	CDU	34.7
2021	Thomas Dietz	AfD	31.7
2025	Thomas Dietz	AfD	46.6

== Election results ==
=== 2025 election ===
Federal election (2025): Erzgebirgskreis I
Notes:	Blue background denotes the winner of the electorate vote. Pink background denotes a candidate elected from their party list. Yellow background denotes an electorate win by a list member, or other incumbent. A ✓ or ✗ denotes status of any incumbent, win or lose respectively.						
Party	Candidate	Votes	%	±%	Party votes	%	±%
AfD	✓ Thomas Dietz	75,867	46.6	▲14.9	75,154	46.2	▲15.6
CDU	Alexander Krauß	40,717	25.0	▼0.4	33,585	20.6	▲1.0
Left	Jennifer Wolf	11,122	6.8	▼1.2	11,359	7.0	▼0.6
SPD	Silvio Heider	10,741	6.6	▼8.2	10,739	6.6	▼11.5
BSW	André Müller	10,287	6.3	New	16,031	9.8	New
FW	Phillip Kirmse	5,545	3.4	▼1.7	3,780	2.3	▼0.9
FDP	Ulrike Harzer	3,590	2.2	▼5.3	4,797	2.9	▼7.2
Greens	Philipp Riese	2,597	1.6	▼0.9	3,646	2.2	▼1.0
Independent	Robby Schubert	2,175	1.3	New			
Tierschutzpartei					1,897	1.2	▼0.7
PARTEI					574	0.4	▼0.7
BD					530	0.3	New
Volt					392	0.2	▲0.1
Pirates					177	0.1	▼0.1
Humanists					102	0.1	0.0
MLPD					53	<0.1	0.0
Informal votes		1,683			1,508		
Total valid votes		162,641			162,816		
Turnout		164,324	80.9	▲4.3			
AfD hold	Majority	35,150	21.6	▲15.3			

=== 2021 election ===
Federal election (2021): Erzgebirgskreis I
Notes:	Blue background denotes the winner of the electorate vote. Pink background denotes a candidate elected from their party list. Yellow background denotes an electorate win by a list member, or other incumbent. A ✓ or ✗ denotes status of any incumbent, win or lose respectively.						
Party	Candidate	Votes	%	±%	Party votes	%	±%
AfD	Thomas Dietz	50,571	31.7	▲1.5	48,794	30.6	▲1.3
CDU	✗ Alexander Krauß	40,550	25.4	▼9.3	31,340	19.6	▼11.3
SPD	Silvio Heider	23,650	14.8	▲5.8	28,848	18.1	▲8.6
Left	Clara Bünger (Note: Bünger entered the Bundestag on the Left list after the resignation of Katja Kipping in January 2022.)	12,787	8.0	▼7.2	12,078	7.6	▼6.5
FDP	Ulrike Harzer	11,914	7.5	▲0.2	16,210	10.2	▲2.8
FW	Andreas Schmiedel	8,210	5.1		5,079	3.2	▲1.8
Greens	Sebastian Walter	4,001	2.5	▼0.1	5,194	3.3	▲1.0
Tierschutzpartei					2,966	1.9	▲0.4
PARTEI	Carsten Staat	2,422	1.5		1,650	1.0	▲0.2
dieBasis	Grit Weiß	2,313	1.5		1,958	1.2	
Bündnis C	Simon Haustein	2,069	1.3		1,940	1.2	
NPD					914	0.6	▼1.1
Gesundheitsforschung					673	0.4	
Pirates					397	0.2	▼0.1
Team Todenhöfer					323	0.2	
The III. Path					291	0.2	
ÖDP					256	0.2	▼0.1
Volt					248	0.2	
V-Partei3	Jennifer Schilling	520	0.3		166	0.1	0.0
Independent	Sandro Reichel	488	0.3				
Humanists					150	0.1	
DKP					102	0.1	
MLPD					58	0.0	0.0
Informal votes		2,261			2,121		
Total valid votes		159,495			159,635		
Turnout		161,756	76.7	▲1.2			
AfD gain from CDU	Majority	10,021	6.3				

=== 2017 election ===
Federal election (2017): Erzgebirgskreis I
Notes:	Blue background denotes the winner of the electorate vote. Pink background denotes a candidate elected from their party list. Yellow background denotes an electorate win by a list member, or other incumbent. A ✓ or ✗ denotes status of any incumbent, win or lose respectively.						
Party	Candidate	Votes	%	±%	Party votes	%	±%
CDU	Alexander Krauß	56,716	34.7	▼15.5	50,759	31.0	▼15.1
AfD	Karsten Teubner	49,465	30.2		47,952	29.2	▲21.6
Left	Klaus Tischendorf	24,808	15.2	▼5.4	23,090	14.1	▼5.3
SPD	Sören Wittig	14,707	9.0	▼3.1	15,452	9.4	▼3.2
FDP	Tino Günther	11,820	7.2	▲0.7	12,106	7.4	▲3.7
Greens	Sebastian Walter	4,334	2.6	▼0.5	3,661	2.2	▼0.3
NPD					2,727	1.7	▼2.4
Tierschutzpartei					2,354	1.4	
FW					2,343	1.4	▼0.2
PARTEI					1,424	0.9	
Pirates					531	0.3	▼1.6
BGE					493	0.3	
ÖDP					378	0.2	
DiB					269	0.2	
V-Partei³					213	0.1	
MLPD					121	0.1	0.0
BüSo					98	0.1	▼0.1
Independent	Jörg Held	1,702	1.0				
Informal votes		3,149			2,730		
Total valid votes		163,552			163,971		
Turnout		166,701	75.5	▲5.9			
CDU hold	Majority	7,251	4.5	▼25.1			

=== 2013 election ===
Federal election (2013): Erzgebirgskreis I
Notes:	Blue background denotes the winner of the electorate vote. Pink background denotes a candidate elected from their party list. Yellow background denotes an electorate win by a list member, or other incumbent. A ✓ or ✗ denotes status of any incumbent, win or lose respectively.						
Party	Candidate	Votes	%	±%	Party votes	%	±%
CDU	✓ Günter Baumann	79,318	50.2	▲9.9	73,098	46.0	▲7.5
Left	Andrea Schrutek	32,472	20.6	▼3.1	30,741	19.4	▼5.9
SPD	Wolfgang Gunkel	19,143	12.1	▲1.2	20,114	12.7	▲0.7
AfD					12,119	7.6	
FDP	Heinz-Peter Haustein	10,246	6.5	▼8.7	5,828	3.7	▼10.4
NPD	David Schröer	8,425	5.3	▲0.3	6,398	4.0	▼1.0
Greens	Bert Meyer	5,051	3.2	▼0.6	3,964	2.5	▼1.3
Pirates	Sebastian Hacker	3,263	2.1		3,008	1.9	
FW					2,551	1.6	
PRO					613	0.4	
BüSo					183	0.1	▼0.6
MLPD					133	0.1	▼0.2
Informal votes		3,800			2,968		
Total valid votes		157,918			158,750		
Turnout		161,718	69.6	▲5.1			
CDU hold	Majority	36,846	29.6	▲13.0			

=== 2009 election ===
Federal election (2009): Erzgebirgskreis I
Notes:	Blue background denotes the winner of the electorate vote. Pink background denotes a candidate elected from their party list. Yellow background denotes an electorate win by a list member, or other incumbent. A ✓ or ✗ denotes status of any incumbent, win or lose respectively.						
Party	Candidate	Votes	%	±%	Party votes	%	±%
CDU	Günter Baumann	63,211	40.3	▲1.8	60,413	38.5	▲5.1
Left	Andrea Schrutek	37,166	23.7	▲2.7	39,545	25.2	▲2.7
FDP	Heinz-Peter Haustein	23,820	15.2	▲5.2	22,051	14.1	▲3.4
SPD	Sebastian Vogel	17,168	11.0	▼8.1	18,846	12.0	▼8.2
NPD	Ulrich Pätzold	7,930	5.1	▼1.5	7,876	5.0	▼1.4
Greens	Hartmut Kahl	5,896	3.8	▲1.8	5,919	3.8	▲1.1
Independent	Markus Peuschel	1,580	1.0				
BüSo					1,157	0.7	▲0.2
REP					618	0.4	▼0.1
MLPD					373	0.2	▲0.1
Informal votes		2,884			2,857		
Total valid votes		156,771			156,798		
Turnout		159,655	64.5	▼12.4			
CDU win new seat	Majority	26,045	16.6				
