= Clara Bünger =

German politician (born 1986)

Clara Bünger MdB
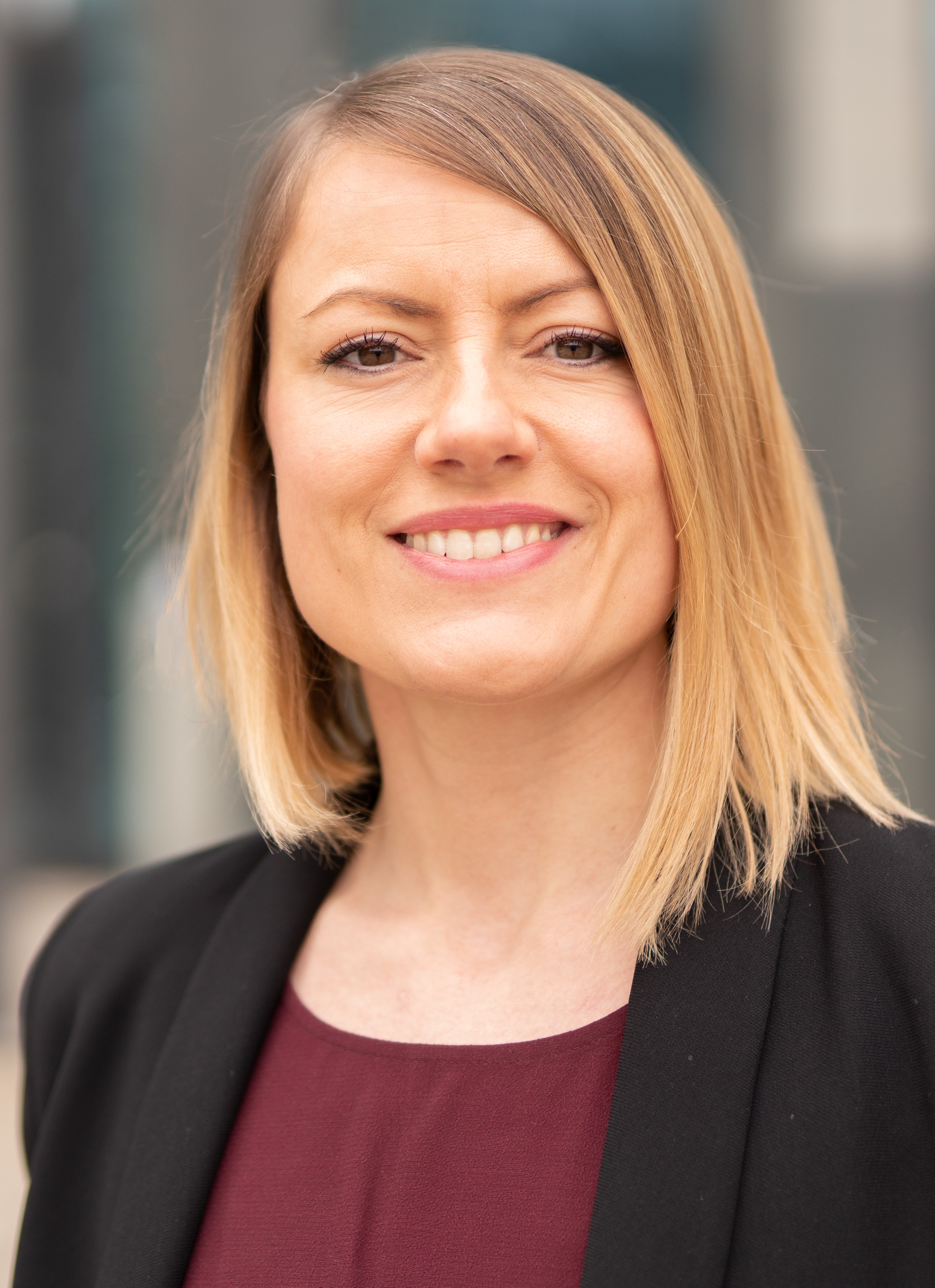
- Bünger in 2021

Member of the Bundestag
- Incumbent
- Assumed office 5 January 2022
- Preceded by: Katja Kipping

Personal details
- Born: 4 July 1986 (age 40) Oldenburg, Lower Saxony, West Germany
- Party: The Left
- Education: Leipzig University
- Occupation: Politician
- Website: clarabuenger.de

Clara Bünger (born 4 July 1986) is a German jurist and politician serving as a member of the Bundestag for The Left since 2022.

== Early life and education ==
Bünger was born in Oldenburg in 1986 and grew up in Freiberg. She studied Law at Leipzig University from 2005 until 2012 when she finished her first Staatsexam. In 2012 she worked for a law firm in Israel which enforced compensation claims and pension entitlements of Holocaust survivors against the German state under the Reparations Agreement between Israel and the Federal Republic of Germany. During 2013 and 2015 she completed her legal clerkship, working at the Federal Foreign Office, the European Center for Constitutional and Human Rights and an international law firm in Singapore. She finished her second Staatsexam in Berlin in 2015 and has been a fully qualified lawyer ever since.

== Human rights lawyer and activist ==
Since 2014, Bünger has been committed to helping refugees, especially those arriving on the Greek islands. In spring 2016, she was the legal advice coordinator for the Refugee Law Clinics Germany on Chios. Although the conditions for refugees were as precarious as on Lesbos, there was hardly any media attention. In addition, there were no EU or UN representatives on the island at the time. As a legal advisor, she informed the refugees about the practical consequences of the EU-Turkey deal. In 2017, Bünger co-founded the association Equal Rights Beyond Borders, which offers free legal aid for refugees and asylum seekers and conducts strategic litigation in the field of migration in front of Greek and German courts and the European Court of Human Rights.

== Political career ==
In 2021, Bünger was a candidate for the electoral constituency Erzgebirgskreis I but lost to Thomas Dietz. In 2022, Bünger moved up into the Bundestag, after Katja Kipping resigned to join the state government of Berlin.

Despite her late entry into the Bundestag, she was ranked 7th among the Members of Parliament who gave the most speeches at the mid-term review of the legislative period.

She is a full member of the Committee on Legal Affairs and deputy member of the Committee on the Interior and Home Affairs. Between 8 July 2022 and 6 December 2023, she was chairwoman for The Left on the Parliamentary Committee of Inquiry into the withdrawal of the Bundeswehr from Afghanistan.

== Publications ==
- „Dynamiken der Einwanderungsgesellschaft“ with Catharina Ziebritzki, in: Neue Zeitschrift für Verwaltungsrecht NVwZ 2017, 200
- „Griechische Nazis vor Gericht – Das Verfahren gegen die Goldene Morgenröte“ – , in: Forum Recht 01/17
- „From first reception center to pre-removal facilities – Supreme Administrative court of Greece decides that Turkey is a safe third country” with Robert Nestler. 2017
- „Erst Haft, dann Cherry Picking?“ with Robert Nestler, in: Verfassungsblog 17.07.2019
- „#WirhabenPlatz – Die Diskussion um Landesaufnahmeprogramme für Schutzsuchende aus den griechischen Hotspots“, in: „Grundrechte-Report 2021 – Zur Lage der Bürger- und Menschenrechte in Deutschland“, Benjamin Derin et al. (Hg.), S. Fischer Verlag, Frankfurt am Main, 2021, ISBN 978-3-596-70622-8
- „Auf hoher See ausgesetzt – Frontex muss sich vor dem Europäischen Gerichtshof verantworten“, in: „Recht gegen Rechts Report 2022“, Nele Austermann et al. (Hg.), S. Fischer Verlag, Frankfurt am Main 2022, ISBN 978-3-10-397134-7
- „Vom Recht auf Asyl zur Entrechtung an den EU-Außengrenzen“, 17.05.2023
- „Seenotretter:innen als Staatsfeinde Nr.1? Zum Vorwurf der Schlepperei durch die griechische Justiz", in: „Recht gegen Rechts Report 2024", Nele Austermann et al. (Hg.), S. Fischer Verlag, Frankfurt am Main, 2024, ISBN 978-3-10-397556-7
