= Equal Rights Beyond Borders =

European charitable organisation

Equal Rights Beyond Borders is a charitable organization, founded in 2016, headquartered in Berlin, Germany, and Athens, Greece, with additional offices on the Greek islands Chios and Kos. The organization provides free legal assistance to refugees and asylum seekers in its offices in Athens, Kos, and Chios, including support in asylum procedures, and Dublin regarding family reunification, and detention-related cases.

In Greece, its work focuses on legal counselling in asylum procedures, assistance in detention-related cases, access to social rights, and litigation concerning alleged human rights violations.

In Germany, the organization engages in strategic litigation and supports family reunification cases under the Dublin III Regulation involving individuals who arrived in Greece and have family members in Germany.

Accordingly, the organization represents individual clients and also engages in strategic litigation in cases that may draw attention to broader structural human rights violations. In doing so, it represents clients before Greek, German, European, and international courts.

== Structure ==
Equal Rights Beyond Borders operates through two separate legal entities registered in Germany and Greece. The work is coordinated by a transnational management board. The international expert advisory board includes national and international lawyers experienced in refugee and migration law, as well as journalists and church representatives. Among them from Germany are Professors Anna Lübbe and Nora Markard, as well as Professor Violetta Moreno-Lax from Queen Mary University of London.

The organization is funded through grants from humanitarian foundations as well as through donations.

== History ==
In March 2016, the EU-Turkey Statement of 18 March 2016 was agreed. Following its implementation, thousands of people on the move were confined to the Greek islands and prevented from traveling to the Greek mainland. As a result, the so-called "EU-hotspots", which had existed since 2015, effectively developed into facilities combining reception, detention, and deportation functions.

Against this backdrop, some young lawyers trained in Germany traveled to the Greek island of Chios to provide legal support to asylum seekers arriving there by boat. In coordination with Greek lawyers, they established a solidarity network, initially under the name "Refugee Law Clinics Abroad". Law students from Germany subsequently began traveling regularly to Chios for limited periods to offer free legal advice.

In 2016, the non-profit registered association Equal Rights Beyond Borders e.V. was founded. Among its co-founders was Clara Bünger, who later became a member of the German Bundestag. In 2017, she was involved in establishing and setting up the organization's first office on Chios, which became one of the first NGO-run legal information centers on the island.

The organization opened an office in Athens in 2018 and an office in Berlin in 2019. Since 2021, it has also been supporting people on the move from its newest office on the Greek island of Kos, which hosts a Closed Controlled Access Center (CCAC). The conditions in the camp on Kos have been criticized several times in the past by journalists and human rights organizations. In addition to inhumane living conditions, the detention of families, children and vulnerable people, such as pregnant women or victims of sexualized violence, was particularly criticized. In February 2023, the organization, together with terre des hommes, issued a public statement concerning the detention of minors on Kos.

== Work ==
Equal Rights Beyond Borders provides free legal assistance to people on the move through its offices in Athens, Chios, and Kos.

In Greece, the organization offers legal counselling in asylum procedures, supports individuals in detention-related cases, assists with access to social rights, and represents clients in litigation concerning alleged human rights violations.

Since 2023, the organization has operated a project providing legal support to survivors of sexual and gender-based violence (SGBV) in asylum procedures, criminal proceedings, and matters of family law.

In Germany, the organization engages in strategic litigation and provides legal support in family reunification cases under the Dublin III Regulation involving individuals who arrived in Greece and have family members in Germany.

Beyond individual legal representation, Equal Rights Beyond Borders pursues strategic litigation aimed at addressing structural human rights violations at Europe's external borders. In this context, the organization represents clients before Greek and German courts, as well as before European and international judicial bodies, including the European Court of Human Rights (ECtHR).

The organization regularly publishes legal analyses and expert reports, including assessments of detention practices and the human rights situation of people on the move in Greece. Equal Rights Beyond Borders has been cited in national and international media and has contributed to legal and policy debates on asylum and migration law in Europe.

== Media attention ==
Lawyers and representatives of Equal Rights Beyond Borders are regularly cited in national and international media as experts on asylum, migration, and human rights law. In interviews and opinion pieces, they comment on the situation of human rights and the rule of law at Europe's external borders, express criticism of the European Union's migration policy and its deterrence-based approach, and assess the impact of the EU–Turkey statement on people on the move on the Greek islands in the Aegean Sea.

In 2023, representatives of the organization commented publicly on the investigation of one of the deadliest shipwrecks in the Mediterranean, which resulted in hundreds of deaths. In this context, they also addressed migration policies beyond Europe, including those of the United States.

The organization has repeatedly expressed criticism of proposals for reform of the Common European Asylum System (CEAS), which have been the subject of public and political debate in Germany and other European countries.

== Scientific engagement ==
Since its foundation, Equal Rights Beyond Borders has published a range of legal analyses, expert opinions, and reports on the human rights situation of people on the move in Greece, particularly concerning asylum procedures, detention practices, and access to fundamental rights. Members of the organization regularly contribute as authors to the Verfassungsblog, where they write on issues of asylum law, migration law, and European constitutional and human rights law.

Representatives of the organization also participate in academic and professional discourse through lectures, panel discussions, and conferences in Germany and other European countries.

Equal Rights Beyond Borders has co-hosted several international conferences, for example in 2022 in Berlin, together with Amnesty International, Brot für die Welt, Diakonie Deutschland, European Center for Constitutional and Human Rights, medico international, Misereor and Pro Asyl and in 2023 together with Diakonie Deutschland on Kos.

== Awards ==
In 2025, Equal Rights Beyond Borders was recognized as a flagship project with the “Wir für morgen” award by Union Investment. The charitable initiative “Wir für morgen” has, since 2022, honored non-profit projects in the areas of social issues, education, and the environment that blaze new trails with exemplary impact and role-model character.

== Publications ==
- Report on the “Safe Areas” of the Closed/Controlled Access Centres on Kos and Leros, June 2025 | Kos
- ‘Suspended and Secluded: The State of Unaccompanied and Separated Children in Greece’, June 2025 | | Kos
- "Still detained and forgotten" – Update on Detention Policies, Practices, and Conditions on Kos“, Equal Rights Beyond Borders (Hg.), March 2024
- ‘Still detained and forgotten’ Update on Detention Policies, Practices, and Conditions on Kos 2024, April 2025 | Kos
- Kos's Unseen Housing Crisis, November 2024 | Jamie Kessler, Marilena Kosmopoulou, Christina Balta | Kos
- Immigration Detention Across Borders, July 2024 | Equal Rights Beyond Borders, Immigrants’ Rights Policy Clinic UCLA School of Law | Berlin, Athen, Kos
- ‘Still detained and forgotten’, April 2024 | Kos
- Behind Walls and Bars, November 2023 | Terre des Hommes & Tina Al-khersan, Jamie Kessler, Anne Pertsch | Chios, Athen, Kos
- Asylum detention under the European Convention on Human Rights, October 2023 | Juan Ruiz Ramos
- Report on Conference – Immigration Detention in the EU, Kos, 08.-10.06.2023, Equal Rights Beyond Borders (Hg.), September 2023
- "Still detained and forgotten" – Update on Detention Policies, Practices, and Conditions on Kos 2022/2023“, Equal Rights Beyond Borders (Hg.), February 2023
- "Extraordinary Measures" - How Greece used the COVID-19 pandemic as a Pretext for the Unlawful Detention of Asylum Seekers on Chios, Equal Rights Beyond Borders (Hg.), February 2023
- The State of the Border Procedure on the Greek Islands, Equal Rights Beyond Borders/HIAS Greece/Refugee Support Aegean (Hg.), October 2022
- Detained and Forgotten at the Gates of the EU - Detention of Migrants on the Island of Kos, Equal Rights Beyond Borders, November 2021
