= Thomas Dietz (politician) =

German politician (born 1967)

Personal details
- Born: 12 February 1967 (age 59) Chemnitz, East Germany
- Party: AfD

Thomas Eckhard Dietz (born 2 March 1967) is a German politician and a member of the Bundestag for Alternative for Germany. He represents the constituency of Erzgebirgskreis I.

== Life and politics ==
Dietz was born in Chemnitz (then called Karl-Marx-Stadt) in the former East Germany, and grew up in Lugau. After graduating from high school, he became an apprentice printer. He worked in the printing industry for twenty years before founding a real estate business.

He started his political career as a member of the German Social Union (DSU) party in the 1990s founded a branch of the party in Stollberg. He then became a member of Electoral Alternative 2013 which later became Alternative for Germany. Between 2017 and 2021, he worked for the office of AfD politician Ulrich Oehme. In the 2021 German federal election, Dietz was directly elected to the constituency seat of Erzgebirgskreis I defeating CDU politician Alexander Krauß.

== Positions ==
Dietz describes himself as a conservative liberal and cites his opposition to the eurozone as motivating him to join the AfD. In the area of energy policy, Dietz opposes the construction of new wind turbines. Instead, he advocates the use of nuclear energy and advocates research into dual-fluid reactors to solve repository issues. In terms of asylum policy, Dietz advocates local support for refugees and rejects what he describes as uncontrolled immigration to Germany.
