= Thomas Ladzinski =

German politician (born 1989)

Member of the Bundestag
- Incumbent
- Assumed office TBD
- Preceded by: Markus Reichel
- Constituency: Dresden I

Personal details
- Born: 1989 (age 36–37)
- Party: Alternative for Germany

Thomas Max Ladzinski (born 1989) is a German politician who was elected as a member of the Bundestag in 2025. He is the leader of the Alternative for Germany in the city council of Dresden.
