= Erzgebirge 1 =

State electoral district of Germany

12: Erzgebirge 1
- Electoral district for the Landtag of Saxony
- Erzgebirge 1 in 2024
- District: Erzgebirgskreis
- Electorate: 56,630 (2024)
- Major settlements: Lugau, Oelsnitz, Stollberg, and Thalheim

Current electoral district
- Party: AfD
- Member: Katja Dietz

Erzgebirge 1 is an electoral constituency (German: Wahlkreis) represented in the Landtag of Saxony. It elects one member via first-past-the-post voting. Under the constituency numbering system, it is designated as constituency 12. It is within the district of Erzgebirgskreis.

== Geography ==
The constituency comprises the towns of Lugau, Oelsnitz, Stollberg, and Thalheim, and the districts of Amtsberg, Auerbach, Burkhardtsdorf, Gornsdorf, Hohndorf, Jahnsdorf, Neukirchen, Niederdorf, and Niederwürschnitz within Erzgebirgskreis.

There were 56,630 eligible voters in 2024.

== Members ==
Election	Member	Party	%
2014	Rico Anton	CDU	41.6
2019	Rico Anton	CDU	37.6
2022	Robert Clemen	CDU	
2024	Katja Dietz	AfD	37.4

== Election results ==
=== 2024 election ===
State election (2024): Erzgebirge 1
Notes:	Blue background denotes the winner of the electorate vote. Pink background denotes a candidate elected from their party list. Yellow background denotes an electorate win by a list member, or other incumbent. A ✓ or ✗ denotes status of any incumbent, win or lose respectively.						
Party	Candidate	Votes	%	±%	Party votes	%	±%
AfD	Katja Dietz	15,918	37.4	▲6.4	14,781	34.6	▲5.1
CDU	Stephan Weinrich	14,351	33.7	▼3.1	14,235	33.3	▼2.9
BSW	Thomas Thamm	4,499	10.6		5,509	12.9	
FW	Peter Marcel Schmidt	3,342	7.9	▲2.9	1,158	2.7	▼1.4
SPD	Silvio Heider	1,743	4.1	▼2.3	2,314	5.4	▼1.6
Left	Barbara Drechsel	1,397	3.3	▼8.2	1,042	2.4	▼7.6
Greens	Philipp Riese	538	1.3	▼3.5	698	1.6	▼2.5
FDP	Marvin Siedel	396	0.9	▼2.7	311	0.7	▼2.8
Freie Sachsen	W. Max Schmidl	389	0.9		1,333	3.1	
APT					424	1.0	
Bündnis C					234	0.5	
PARTEI					225	0.5	▼0.6
Values					122	0.3	
BD					100	0.2	
dieBasis					64	0.1	
Pirates					63	0.1	
V-Partei3					38	0.1	
ÖDP					29	0.1	
BüSo					18	0.0	
Informal votes		528			403		
Total valid votes		42,573			42,698		
Turnout		43,101	76.1	▲7.7			
AfD gain from CDU	Majority	1,567	3.7				

=== 2019 election ===
State election (2019): Erzgebirge 1
Notes:	Blue background denotes the winner of the electorate vote. Pink background denotes a candidate elected from their party list. Yellow background denotes an electorate win by a list member, or other incumbent. A ✓ or ✗ denotes status of any incumbent, win or lose respectively.						
Party	Candidate	Votes	%	±%	Party votes	%	±%
CDU	✓ Rico Anton	14,532	36.8	▼4.8	14,331	36.2	▼8.1
AfD		12,236	31.0	▲20.8	11,698	29.6	▲19.0
Left		4,524	11.5	▼12.3	3,974	10.0	▼9.2
SPD		2,537	6.4	▼2.5	2,763	7.0	▼3.6
FW		2,308	5.8	▲3.0	1,608	4.1	▲2.8
Greens		1,891	4.8	▲0.5	1,656	4.2	▲1.1
FDP		1,429	3.6	▲1.2	1,396	3.5	▲0.7
APT					625	1.6	▲0.7
PARTEI					464	1.2	▲0.8
NPD					343	0.9	▼4.9
Verjüngungsforschung					225	0.6	
The Blue Party					133	0.3	
ÖDP					85	0.2	
Awakening of German Patriots - Central Germany					71	0.2	
Humanists					54	0.1	
Pirates					53	0.1	Steady
PDV					44	0.1	
DKP					29	0.1	
BüSo					21	0.1	▲0.1
Informal votes		569			453		
Total valid votes		39,457			39,573		
Turnout		40,026	67.9	▲18.6			
CDU hold	Majority	2,296	5.8	▼12.0			

=== 2014 election ===
State election (2014): Erzgebirge 1
Notes:	Blue background denotes the winner of the electorate vote. Pink background denotes a candidate elected from their party list. Yellow background denotes an electorate win by a list member, or other incumbent. A ✓ or ✗ denotes status of any incumbent, win or lose respectively.						
Party	Candidate	Votes	%	±%	Party votes	%	±%
CDU	Rico Anton	12,529	41.6		13,393	44.3	
Left		7,161	23.8		5,801	19.2	
AfD		3,058	10.2		3,197	10.6	
SPD		2,690	8.9		3,213	10.6	
NPD		1,616	5.4		1,758	5.8	
Greens		1,290	4.3		924	3.1	
FW		844	2.8		386	1.3	
FDP		720	2.4		847	2.8	
APT					285	0.9	
Pirates		220	0.7		200	0.1	
PARTEI					115	0.4	
DSU					41	0.1	
Pro Germany Citizens' Movement					35	0.1	
BüSo					13	0.0	
Informal votes		489			409		
Total valid votes		30,128			30,208		
Turnout		30,617	49.7	▼11.4			
CDU win new seat	Majority	5,368	17.8				

== See also ==
- Politics of Saxony
- Landtag of Saxony
