= Bernd Riexinger =

German politician

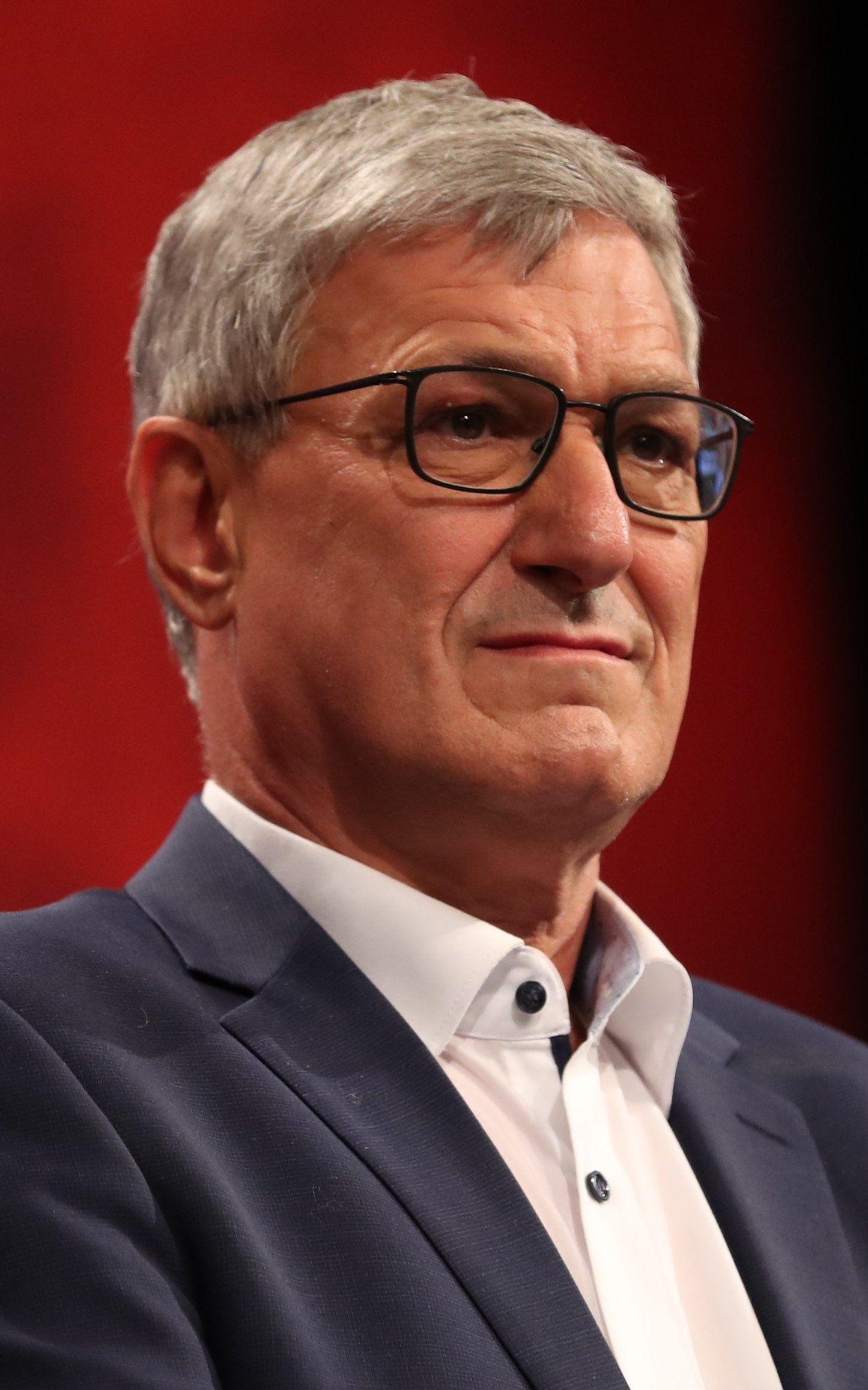
- Riexinger in 2018

Leader of The Left
- In office 2 June 2012 – 27 February 2021 Serving with Katja Kipping
- Preceded by: Klaus Ernst
- Succeeded by: Susanne Hennig-Wellsow

Member of the Bundestag for Baden-Württemberg
- In office 24 October 2017 – 25 March 2025
- Preceded by: multi-member district
- Constituency: The Left List

Personal details
- Born: 30 October 1955 (age 70) Leonberg, Baden-Württemberg, West Germany (now Germany)
- Party: The Left (2007–)
- Other political affiliations: Labour and Social Justice – The Electoral Alternative (2004–2007)

Bernd Riexinger (born 30 October 1955) is a German politician of the left party Die Linke and member of the Bundestag representing Baden-Württemberg. From 2012 to 2021 he was co-chairperson of The Left alongside Katja Kipping.

== Career ==
Riexinger states he comes from a working-class family. As a staunch pacifist, he refused military service in his youth. Riexinger was trained as a bank clerk after secondary school and business school, and was employed by Leonberger Bausparkasse until 1980. From 1980 to 1990 he was on the works council of Leonberger Bausparkasse; there he received further training in labour, collective bargaining, and social law. In 1991 he became a trade union official. Riexinger is a member of the Initiative for networking between trade union leftists and is active in the Social Forum movement in Germany.

== Political career ==
In 2003, Riexinger was among the initiators of mass protests against the Agenda 2010 of the federal government at that time. He joined Labour and Social Justice (WASG), a left-wing splinter of the Social Democrats. He served as the party's regional chairman in Baden-Württemberg until WASG merged into The Left in 2007. Until 2012, he was executive director of the Stuttgart division of the trade union ver.di, as well as a member of the executive board of The Left in Baden-Württemberg.

Riexinger is affiliated with the Socialist Left, a strongly socialist faction within The Left which is classified as left-wing extremist by the Federal Office for the Protection of the Constitution. He is thus considered a representative of the left wing of the party.

On 30 May 2012, Riexinger announced that he would run for the position of chairman of The Left. On 2 June 2012, he was elected in a narrow contest with Dietmar Bartsch, winning 53.5% of delegate votes. He became co-chairperson alongside Katja Kipping, who was elected in a separate vote.

In June 2015, he was nominated as a top candidate for The Left in the 2016 Baden-Württemberg state election. The party failed to win seats in the election, receiving only 2.8% of the vote.

In the 2017 German federal election, Riexinger was one of six Left candidates elected to the Bundestag from Baden-Württemberg. The party won 6.4% of the vote in the state.

In August 2020, Riexinger and Kipping announced they would step down as co-chairs in accordance with party regulations stating that no position should be held by the same person for more than eight years. The party congress due to elect their successors was scheduled for October/November 2020, but was delayed due to the worsening of the COVID-19 pandemic in Germany. It ultimately took place digitally in February 2021. Kipping, as the designated female co-chair, was succeeded by Janine Wissler; Riexinger was succeeded by Susanne Hennig-Wellsow.

Riexinger announced in December 2024 that he would not be seeking re-election in the 2025 federal election.

== Political positions ==
=== European Union ===
In European monetary policy, Riexinger opposes a return to national currencies and proposals for a European monetary system with coordinated national currencies. This puts him at odds with a number of other figures on the European left, including members of his own party such as Oskar Lafontaine and Sahra Wagenknecht. He seeks the formation of a left-wing "third pole against the neoliberal EU and rampant right-wing populism," and emphasises the importance of solidarity, internationalism, radical democracy, and class consciousness to create a "Europe from the bottom up". To this end, he advocates European integration in a more alter-globlalist framework through international cooperation between left-wing forces.

In April 2020, during the COVID-19 pandemic, Riexinger spoke out in support of the introduction of "coronabonds" on a European level. He stated that Germany, as the largest economy in Europe, should support weaker economies hit hard by the pandemic. He claimed that failing to support struggling states would benefit Eurosceptic and right-wing populist forces.

=== Asylum policy ===
At the party congress in June 2018 in Leipzig, Riexinger advocated "safe, legal paths to asylum and open borders", distancing himself from the conservative positions of parliamentary group leader Sahra Wagenknecht, who criticised Riexinger's statements.

=== Climate change ===
In July 2019, Riexinger told Funke Mediengruppe that he supports blanket nationalisation of all airlines, claiming that a market-based approach is insufficient to manage the high impact of air travel on the climate.

== Controversy ==
In March 2020, Riexinger attended a panel discussion at a state party conference in Kassel. During the panel, a member of the crowd spoke of shooting rich people, to which Riexinger responded "we don't shoot them, we put them to useful work." Afterwards, he was harshly criticised for failing to distance himself from the prospect of violence, and faced calls to resign. He apologised, claiming the audience member's comment was "obviously ironic," but stated his regret that he had not unequivocally rejected the prospect.
