= Kassem Taher Saleh =

German politician (born 1993)

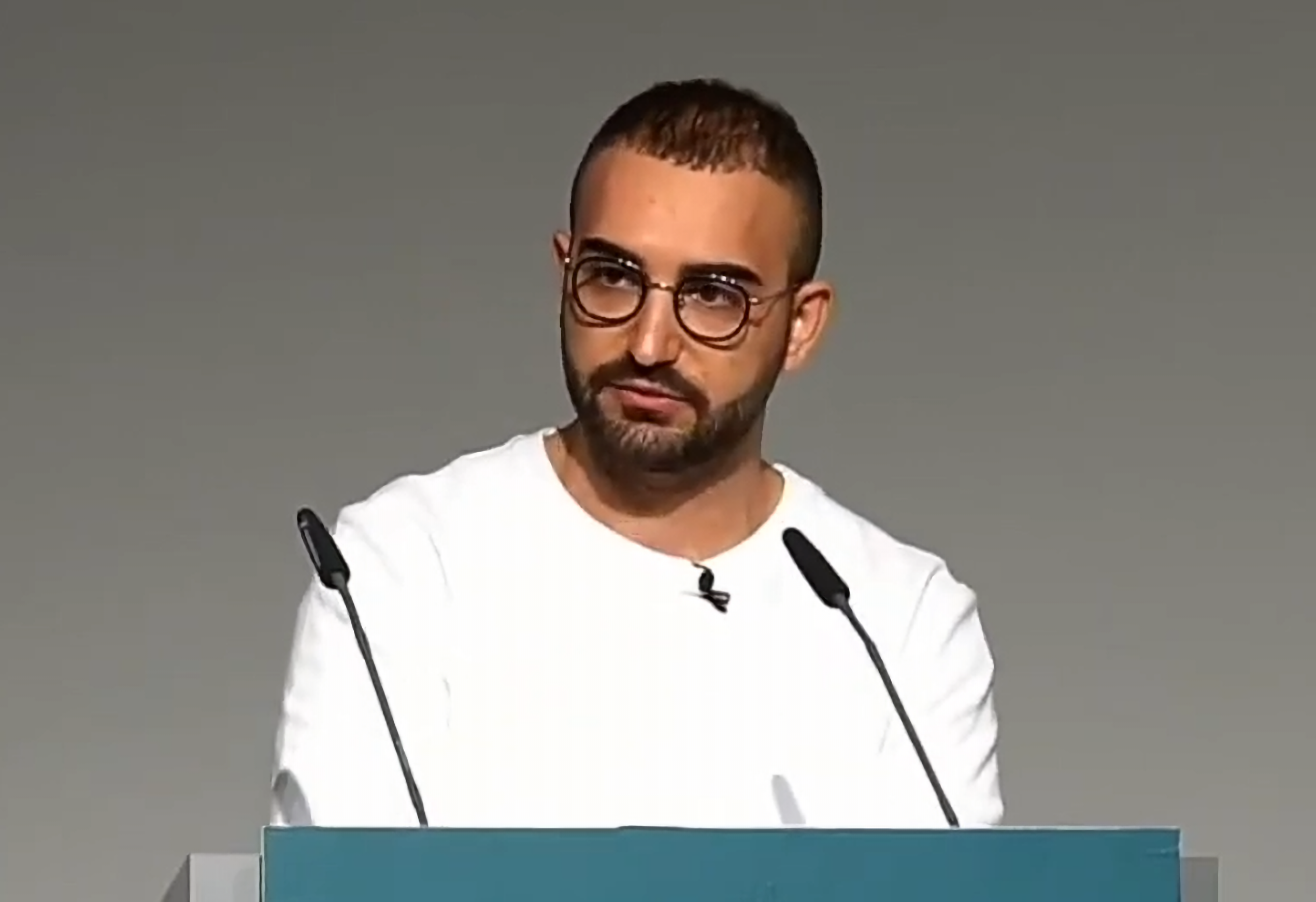

Member of the Bundestag
- Incumbent
- Assumed office 26 October 2021

Personal details
- Born: 1 June 1993 (age 33) Zakho, Iraq
- Party: Alliance 90/The Greens
- Education: TU Dresden

Kassem Taher Saleh (born 1 June 1993) is a German civil engineer and politician of the Alliance 90/The Greens who has been serving as a member of the Bundestag since the 2021 German federal election, representing the Dresden I district.

== Early life and education ==
Taher grew up in Plauen, Vogtland, Germany. He studied civil engineering at TU Dresden and University of Cantabria.

== Political career ==
Taher joined the Greens in 2019. In parliament, he serves on the Committee on Housing, Urban Development, Building and Local Government.

== Other activities ==
- German Industry Initiative for Energy Efficiency (DENEFF), Member of the Parliamentary Advisory Board
- IG Bauen-Agrar-Umwelt (IG BAU), Member
- Dynamo Dresden, Member
