= Rico Anton =

German politician (born 1977)

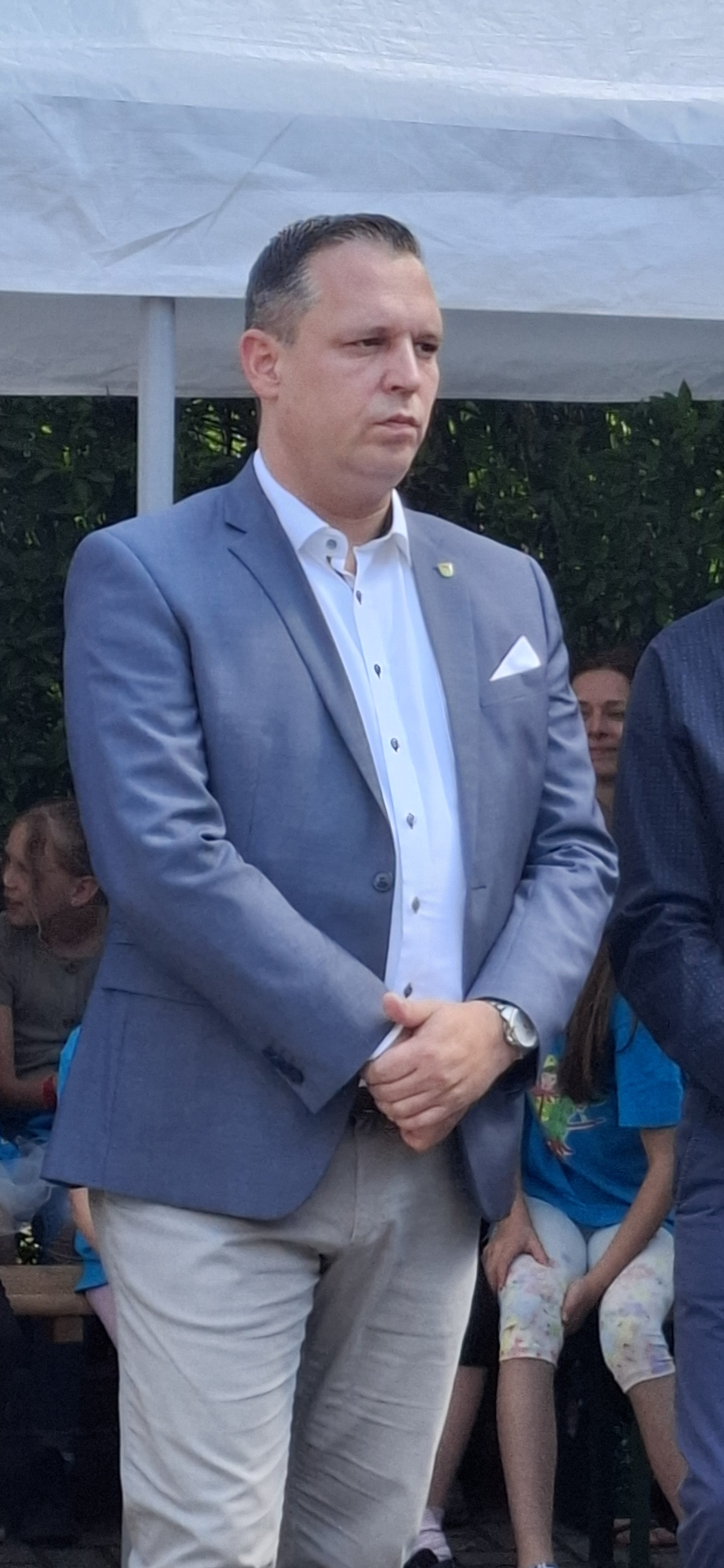
- Anton in 2024

Member of the Landtag of Saxony
- In office 29 September 2014 – 1 August 2022
- Constituency: Erzgebirge 1
- Preceded by: Uta Windisch
- Succeeded by: Robert Clemen

Personal details
- Born: 6 September 1977 (age 48) Stollberg
- Party: Christian Democratic Union (since 2004)

Rico Anton (born 6 September 1977 in Stollberg) is a German politician serving as Landrat of the Erzgebirgskreis since 2022. From 2014 to 2022, he was a member of the Landtag of Saxony.
