= Günter Baumann =

German politician

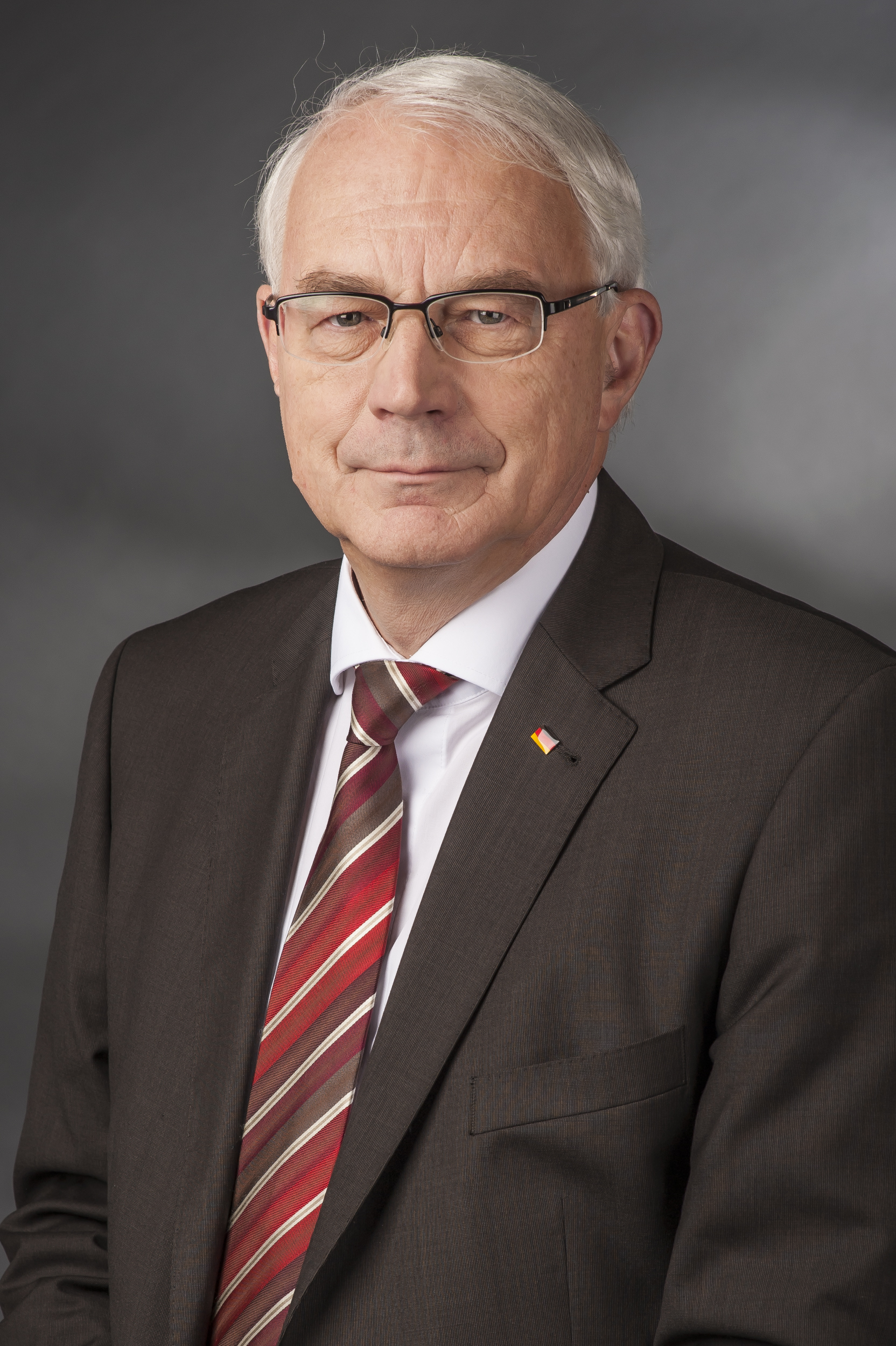
Günter Baumann

Günter Helmut Baumann (born 1 August 1947 in Annaberg-Buchholz, Saxony) is a German politician and member of the CDU. An engineer by profession, Baumann has been a member of the Christian Democratic Union (East Germany) since 1972 until that party merged with its West German counterpart in 1990. From 1990 to 1998 he served as the mayor of Jöhstadt. Since 1998, he has been a directly elected member of the Bundestag, representing the constituencies of Annaberg – Stollberg – Zschopau (1998-2002), Annaberg – Aue-Schwarzenberg (2002 - 2009) and Erzgebirgskreis I since 2009.
