= Rasha Nasr =

German politician (born 1992)

Member of the Bundestag for Dresden
- Incumbent
- Assumed office 26 September 2021
- Constituency: Social Democratic List

Personal details
- Born: 12 May 1992 (age 34) Dresden, Germany
- Party: SPD
- Education: TU Dresden
- Occupation: Politician

Rasha Nasr (born 12 May 1992) is a German politician of the Social Democratic Party.

== Early life ==
Nasr was born in Dresden to Syrian parents. She studied political science at the TU Dresden.

== Political career ==
In the 2021 German federal election Nasr stood in the constituency of Dresden I but came in fourth place in candidate votes. She was elected on the state list, becoming the first Saxon MP with an immigrant background. In the negotiations to form a so-called traffic light coalition of the SPD, the Green Party and the Free Democrats (FDP) following the elections, she was part of her party's delegation in the working group on social policy, co-chaired by Dagmar Schmidt, Sven Lehmann, and Johannes Vogel.

In parliament, Nasr has since been serving on the Committee on Labor and Social Affairs. In this capacity, she is her parliamentary group's rapporteur on refugees and migrants. Within her parliamentary group, she is part of working-groups on social affairs and migration.

Within her parliamentary group, Nasr belongs to the Parliamentary Left, a left-wing movement.
