= Ulrike Harzer =

German politician (born 1968)

Member of the Bundestag
- In office German Bundestag in 2021 – German Bundestag in 2025

Personal details
- Born: 13 June 1968 (age 57)
- Party: Free Democratic Party

Ulrike Harzer (born 13 June 1968 in Karl-Marx-Stadt, GDR) is a German politician for the FDP and has been a member of the Bundestag, the federal diet from 2021 to 2025.

== Life ==
Harzer was born 1968 n Karl-Marx-Stadt and finished her school career there with the Abitur. After discontinuing her studies in education for Slavic studies and English studies, she learned the profession of a business administrator. Until after the political turnaround, Harzer worked at the Interhotel "Kongreß" in Chemnitz. From 1996 she worked as a receptionist at the Berghotel Wettiner Höhe in Seiffen/Erzgeb. She met her husband in the Erzgebirge, in whose company for Ore Mountain folk art in Deutschneudorf she later worked. Harzer is the mother of three children and is of the Evangelical Lutheran denomination.

== Political Commitment ==
Harzer says she was inspired by Guido Westerwelle to become active in politics. When she joined the Free Democratic Party in 2007, she got to know Heinz-Peter Haustein and Tino Günther, the then FDP members of parliament for the Ore Mountains. Between 2008 and 2014, Harzer worked for the FDP parliamentary group in the Saxon state parliament as a parliamentary advisor. Since 2019, Harzer has been district chairwoman of the FDP Erzgebirge. She served as executive director of the FDP-affiliated Wilhelm Külz Foundation until 2021.

Harzer was nominated by her party as a direct candidate for the constituency Erzgebirgskreis I in the 2021 German federal election. In addition, she was elected to fourth place on the state list of the FDP Saxony. Through this list position, Harzer achieved entry into the 20th German Bundestag.

== Positions ==
Harzer focuses on freedom and responsibility, social market economy and economic upswing as a counter-model to a regimenting state. She wants to create "the best educational opportunities and a developed infrastructure" in the Erzgebirge by improving traffic routes, health care and mobility concepts. She wants to support start-ups.

Harzer advocates term limits for politicians in the Bundestag and would like to tie the minimum requirements for a Bundestag mandate to professional experience. In the area of climate protection, Harzer supports the preservation and increase of forest resources.
