= Torsten Herbst =

German politician

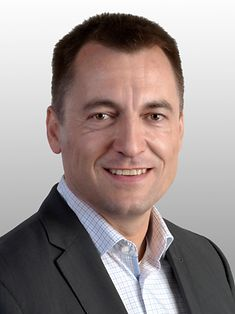
- Herbst in 2017

Member of the Bundestag
- In office 2017–2025

Personal details
- Born: 22 August 1973 (age 53) Dresden, East Germany (now Germany)
- Party: FDP
- Education: Dresden University of Applied Sciences

Torsten Herbst (born 22 August 1973) is a German politician of the Free Democratic Party (FDP) who served as a member of the Bundestag from the state of Saxony from 2017 to 2025. In 2021, he was elected whip of the FDP parliamentary group.

== Early life and education ==
Herbst grew up in the Zschertnitz district of Dresden, where he attended the "Gottfried Semper" polytechnic secondary school and later the Dresden-Plauen grammar school. He did his civilian service in a hospital. He then studied economics at the University of Applied Sciences in Dresden, graduating with a degree in International Business Studies. During his studies he also attended Liverpool John Moores University in 1995/96.

After graduating, Herbst worked as an editorial assistant at Mitteldeutscher Rundfunk and later in the press office of ADAC Sachsen. From 1999 until he entered the Bundestag, he worked for the Dresden-based advertising and PR agency Zastrow + Zastrow. In this role, he advised medium-sized companies on strategic marketing and public relations. He continued to practise his profession to a limited extent during his time as a member of the Landtag.

== Political career ==
Herbst was a founding member of the Young Liberal Action Saxony (Jungliberale Aktion Sachsen, JuliA) in the post-reunification period and its state chair from 1997 to 2000. He was elected deputy state chair of the FDP Saxony in 1999, was secretary general of the FDP Saxony from 2005 to 2019, and has been its treasurer since 2019. Since 2019, he has also been a member of the federal executive committee of the FDP.

In 1999, Herbst was elected deputy state chairman of the FDP in Saxony, and from 2005 to 2019, he was secretary general of the state association, under the leadership of chairman Holger Zastrow. From 2004 to 2014, he was a member of the State Parliament of Saxony.

Herbst became a member of the Bundestag in the 2017 German federal election. In parliament, he served on the Committee on Transport and Digital Infrastructure. From 2019, he was also a member of the federal executive committee of the FDP, under the leadership of chair Christian Lindner.

In the negotiations to form a so-called traffic light coalition of the Social Democratic Party (SPD), the Green Party and the FDP following the 2021 German elections, Herbst was part of his party's delegation in the working group on economic affairs, co-chaired by Carsten Schneider, Cem Özdemir and Michael Theurer.

== Other activities ==
- Federal Network Agency for Electricity, Gas, Telecommunications, Posts and Railway (BNetzA), Member of the Rail Infrastructure Advisory Council
