= Andreas Lämmel =

German politician

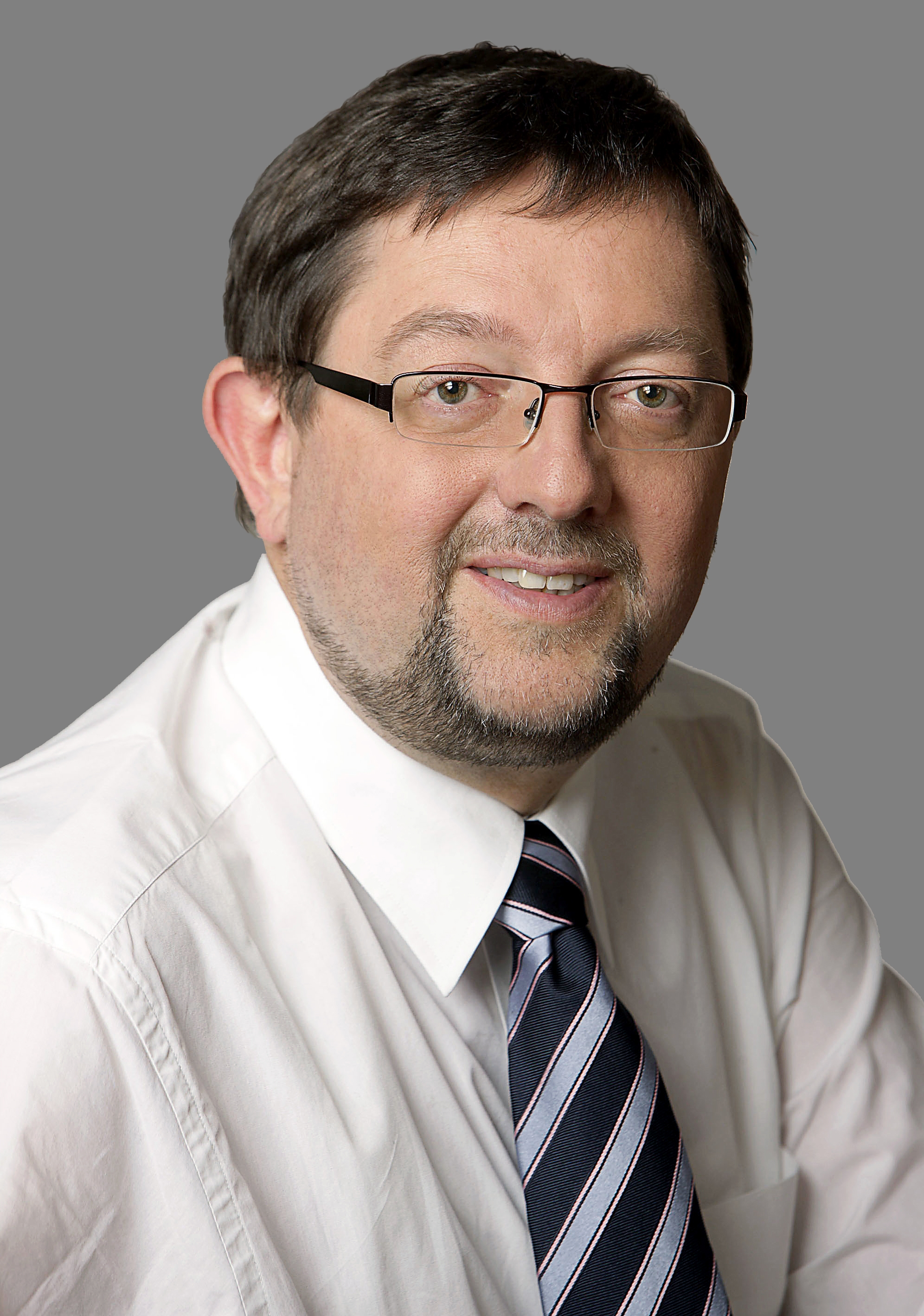
- Andreas Lämmel in 2010

Member of the Bundestag for Dresden I
- Incumbent
- Assumed office 18 October 2005
- Preceded by: Christa Reichard

Personal details
- Born: 19 April 1959 (age 66) Falkenstein, Saxony, East Germany (now Germany)
- Party: CDU

Andreas Lämmel (born 19 April 1959) is a German politician. Born in Falkenstein, Saxony, he represents the CDU. Lämmel served as a member of the Bundestag from the state of Saxony from 2005 to 2021.

== Political career ==
Lämmel first became a member of the Bundestag after the 2005 German federal election. He was a member of the Committee for Economics and Energy.

Lämmel did not run for re-election in the 2021 German federal election.

== Other activities ==
- German-Mozambican Society, Member of the Advisory Board
