= Lugau =

- Town
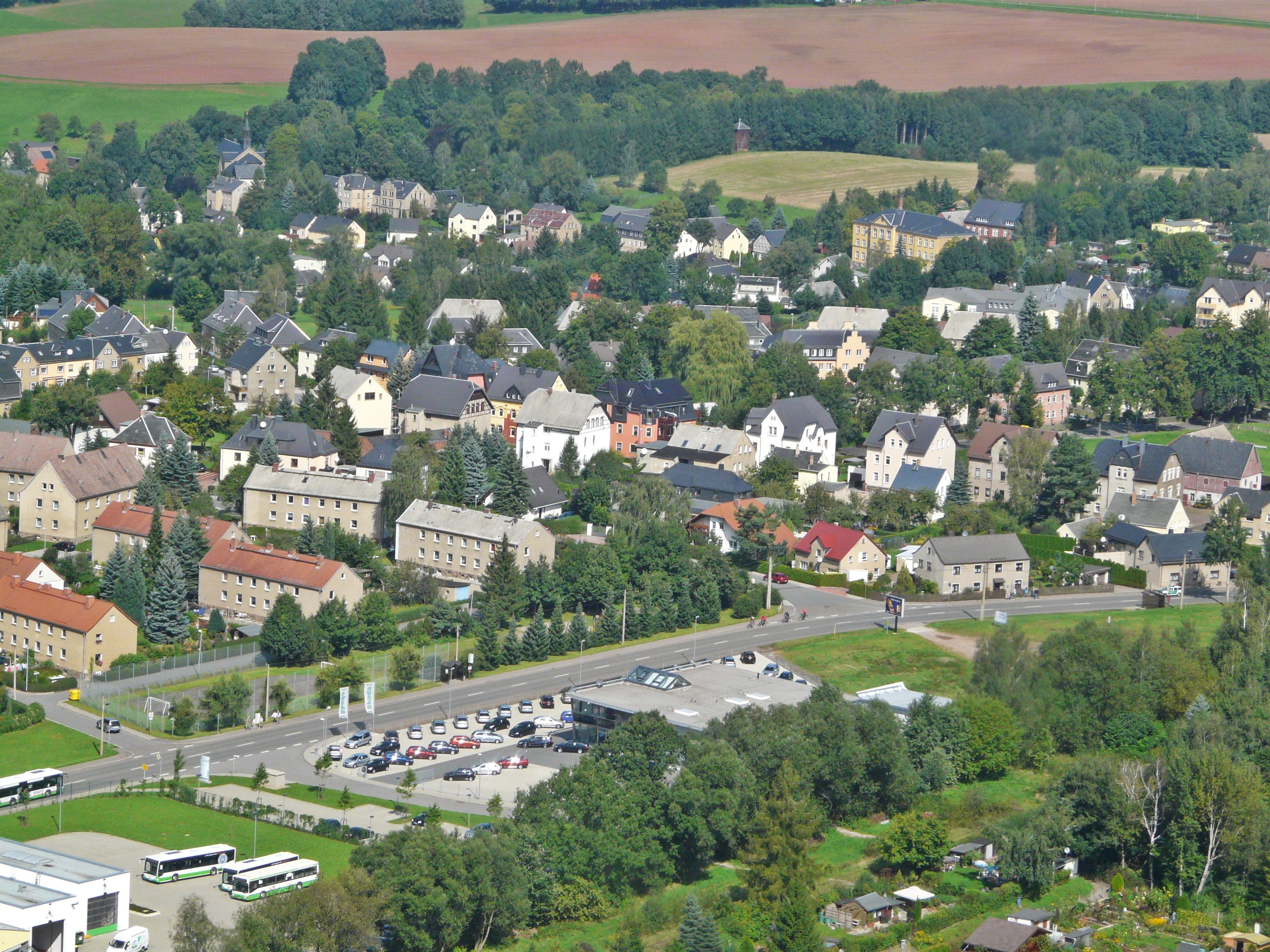

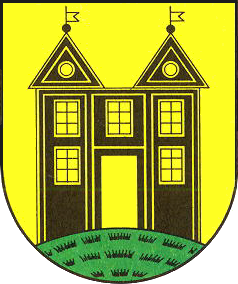
- Coat of arms

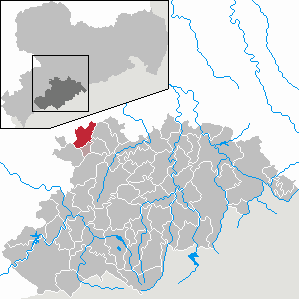
- Location of Lugau within Erzgebirgskreis district
- Interactive map of Lugau
- Location within Germany Location within Saxony
- Coordinates: 50°44′18″N 12°44′47″E
- Country: Germany
- State: Saxony
- District: Erzgebirgskreis

Government
  - Mayor (2022–29): Thomas Weikert (Left)

Area
  - Total: 22.29 km^{2} (8.61 sq mi)
- Elevation: 400 m (1,300 ft)

Population (2025-12-31)
  - Total: 7,345
  - Density: 329.5/km^{2} (853.5/sq mi)
- Time zone: UTC+01:00 (CET)
  - Summer (DST): UTC+02:00 (CEST)
- Postal codes: 09385
- Dialling codes: 037295
- Vehicle registration: ERZ, ANA, ASZ, AU, MAB, MEK, STL, SZB, ZP
- Website: www.stadt-lugau.de

Lugau (German pronunciation: [ˈluːɡaʊ]) is a town in the district Erzgebirgskreis, in the Free State of Saxony, Germany. It is situated 17 km east of Zwickau, and 17 km southwest of Chemnitz. The town has partnerships with Sallaumines (France) and Penzberg (Bavaria).
