= Markus Reichel =

German politician

Member of the Bundestag
- Incumbent
- Assumed office 2021

Personal details
- Born: 15 July 1968 (age 58) Munich, West Germany
- Party: CDU
- Education: University of Vienna; TU Dresden

Markus Reichel (born 15 July 1968) is a German mathematician and politician of the Christian Democratic Union (CDU) who has been serving as a member of the Bundestag since 2021.

== Early life and politics ==
Reichel was born 1968 in the West German city of Munich and graduated from high school at Schäftlarn Abbey.

== Political career ==
Since 2019, Reichel has been the chairman of the CDU in Dresden.

Reichel was directley elected to the Bundestag in 2021 in the Dresden I electoral district. In parliament, he has since been serving on the Committee on Labour and Social Affairs and the Committee on Digital Affairs.
