= Verfassungsblog =

German legal blog on matters constitutional

- Website type: Blog
- Available in: 2 languages
- List of languages English, German
- Founded: July 30, 2009
- Headquarters: {{{location_country}}}
- Founder: Maximilian Steinbeis
- Website: verfassungsblog.de

Verfassungsblog (lit. 'constitution blog') is an academic blog published in German and English that focuses on public law in Germany, Europe and beyond. It was founded on 30 July 2009 by Maximilian Steinbeis and is now published in cooperation with the Berlin Institute for Advanced Study and Humboldt University Berlin.

== Content ==
Maximilian Steinbeis, a Berlin-based lawyer and journalist, opened the blog on 30 July 2009, stating that his blog was the first German-language blog on constitutional law. Although the website began as a personal blog, Steinbeis soon invited others to publish their contributions on the website. The blog initially focused on German law, broadening its focus to constitutional law in Europe, and eventually including publications by American law scholars. As of 2020, Steinbeis remains as the chief editor of the blog.

In 2011, cooperation with the Berlin Institute for Advanced Study began. Verfassungsblog publishes content in four categories: blog posts, debates among multiple scholars, podcasts, and an editorial section. It is open access and all content published on the website receives a DOI for long-term archiving.

More than 1,000 people have published on the blog; contributors include Jürgen Habermas, Pedro Cruz Villalón, Giuliano Amato, Yuval Shany, as well as Robert C. Post.

== Reception ==
The "Recht im Kontext" research association's external evaluation described the blog as "one of the most interesting and most widely read forums for constitutional law and policy" and a "must read" for legal scholars who research constitutional law in Europe. The School of Transnational Governance at the European University Institute described the blog as "one of the leading blogs on constitutional law in Europe". Der Tagesspiegel described it as "an important discourse platform for European law".

The 2020 European Commission rule of law report stated that Verfassungsblog is a "widely read platform for discussions on rule of law related topics [that] has gained in importance over recent years and has become a forum for both domestic as well as European discussions on the rule of law".

Verfassungsblog has been cited in case law, including by Germany's Federal Court of Justice and the Supreme Court of Poland.
