= Jens Maier =

German lawyer and politician (born 1962)

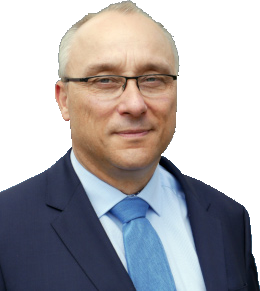

Member of the Bundestag
- In office 24 October 2017 – 26 October 2021

Personal details
- Born: 10 February 1962 (age 64)
- Party: AfD

Jens Maier (born 10 February 1962 in Bremen) is a German judge and politician for Alternative for Germany. The Saxon Office for the Protection of the Constitution classifies him as a right-wing extremist. As of March 24, 2022, he is barred from the bench.

== Life ==
Before becoming a judge at the Landesgericht in Dresden, Maier studied law at the University of Tübingen and held various positions in public administration.

He became a member of the Bundestag after the 2017 German federal election for Saxony. He was a member of Der Flügel, the extremist wing of the Alternative for Germany. This led to the Landesamt für Verfassungsschutz Sachsen classifying him as a far-right extremist.

Maier lost his seat in the 2021 German federal election. After leaving the Bundestag, Jens Maier applied in February 2022 to return as a judge in the civil service of the Saxon judiciary. Because of his far-right activities, there was considerable public doubt that Maier would judge "without regard to the person". As he had a right to an equivalent posting to his earlier position, the Saxon Minister of Justice Katja Meier (Alliance 90/The Greens) offered him a job as district judge at the Dippoldiswalde district court beginning 14 March 14 2022, but also applied to the judges' service court in Leipzig for Maier to be retired. On March 24, 2022, the Landgericht Leipzig barred him from returning to the bench for the time being (until a decision is taken on the further application for retirement in the interests of justice) because "[i]t was obvious that Maier would conduct his office as an "AfD judge" and would thus no longer comply with the legal model of an independent and objective judge."
