= Alexander Krauß =

German politician (born 1975)

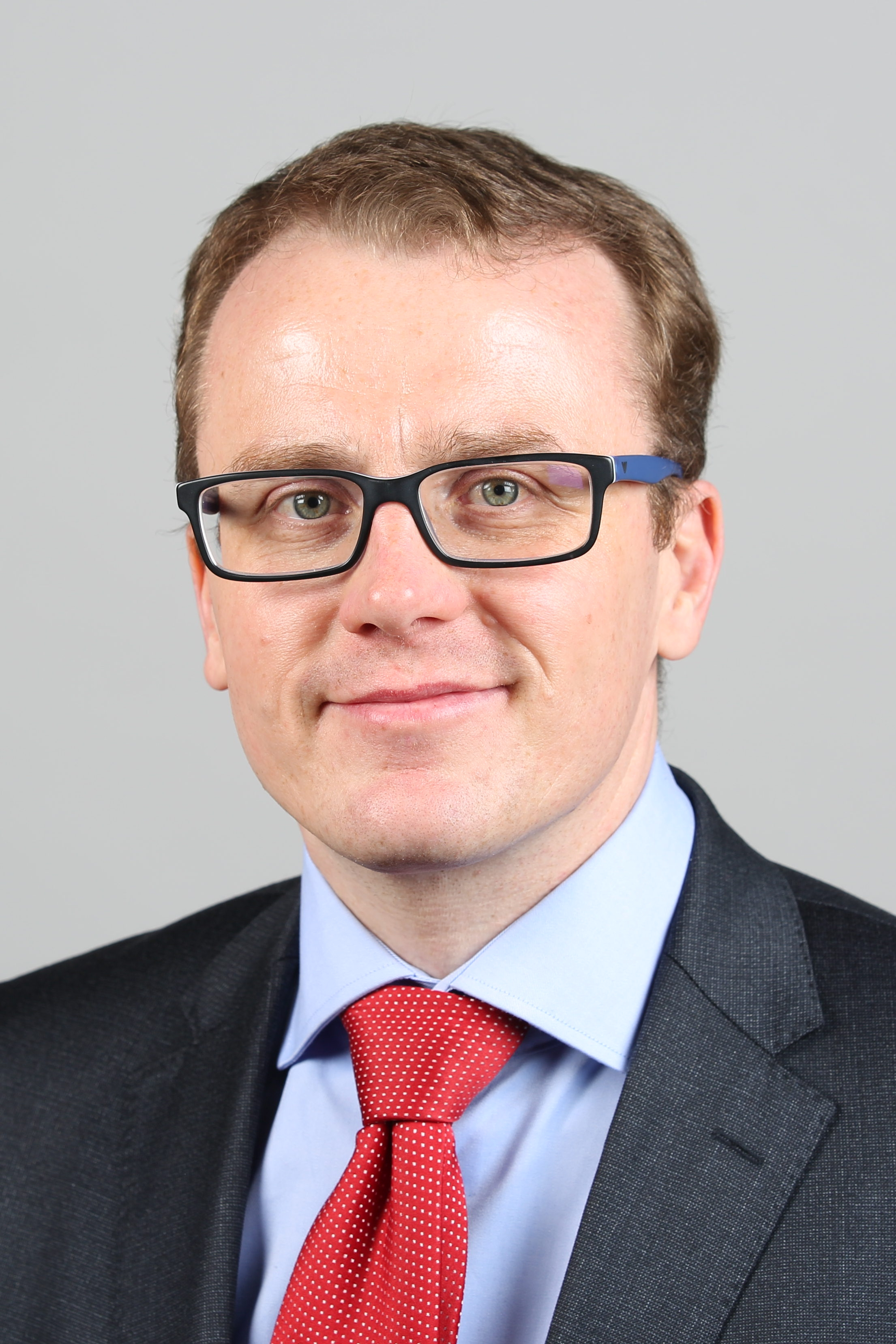

Member of the Bundestag
- In office 2017–2021

Personal details
- Born: 8 December 1975 (age 50)
- Citizenship: German
- Party: CDU

Alexander Gerd Krauß (born 8 December 1975 in Erlabrunn, Germany) is a German politician (Christian Democratic Union (CDU)) who served as a member of the German Bundestag from 2017 to 2021. From 2004 until 2017 he was a member of the Landtag of the Free State of Saxony.

== Early life and career ==
Krauß was born in the former GDR and attended the school in Erlabrunn (Ore Mountains). In 1990 he moved to grammar school (Gymnasium) in Schwarzenberg (Ore Mountains) where he did his A-levels. After the military service and his studies in Political Science, Communication and Media Science as well as Protestant Theology in Leipzig and Prague, he worked initially as a freelance journalist. Since 2002 Krauß has worked in the field of Public Relations of the Zwickau "Stadtmission".

== Political career ==
In the 2004 state elections, Krauß became a member direct candidate of the constituency Aue-Schwarzenberg II in the Landtag of the Free State of Saxony, where he was member of the Committee on Social Affairs, Health, Family, Women and Youth as well as member of the Committee on the Environment and Agriculture. Furthermore, he has been member of the executive and spokesman for youth affairs of the CDU group in the Landtag as well as deputy chairman of the working group for social affairs, health, family, women and youth. In the Saxony state election on 30 August 2009 Kraus defended successfully his direct mandate. In the fifth legislative term Krauß was a member of the Committee on Economy, Work and Transport, member of the Committee on Social Affairs and Consumer Protection of the CDU group in the Landtag of the Free State of Saxony as well as family-policy spokesman.

Since 2009 Krauß has been serving as chairman of the State Youth Welfare Committee and member of the civil foundation's (Bürgerstiftung) advisory council Dresden. He is chairman of the „Europäisches Zentrums für Arbeitsnehmerfragen in Sachsen“. Since 2008 he is regional chairman of the Christian Democratic Employees' Association (CDA Saxony) and since 2011 Federal Deputy Chairman of the CDA. Ex officio, he is member of the CDU state party executive since his assumption of office.

The voter turnout in his 2004 election was 58.5%, the turnout in his 2009 election was merely 50.0%, in his 2014 election only 48.8%.

Krauß was member of the Bundestag from 2017 to 2021. He served on the Committee on Health. In this capacity, he was his parliamentary group's rapporteur on disease management programs.

== Other activities ==
- LEAG, Member of the Supervisory Board

== Personal life ==
Krauß has been married since 2006 and has three children.
