= Sebastian Roloff =

German politician

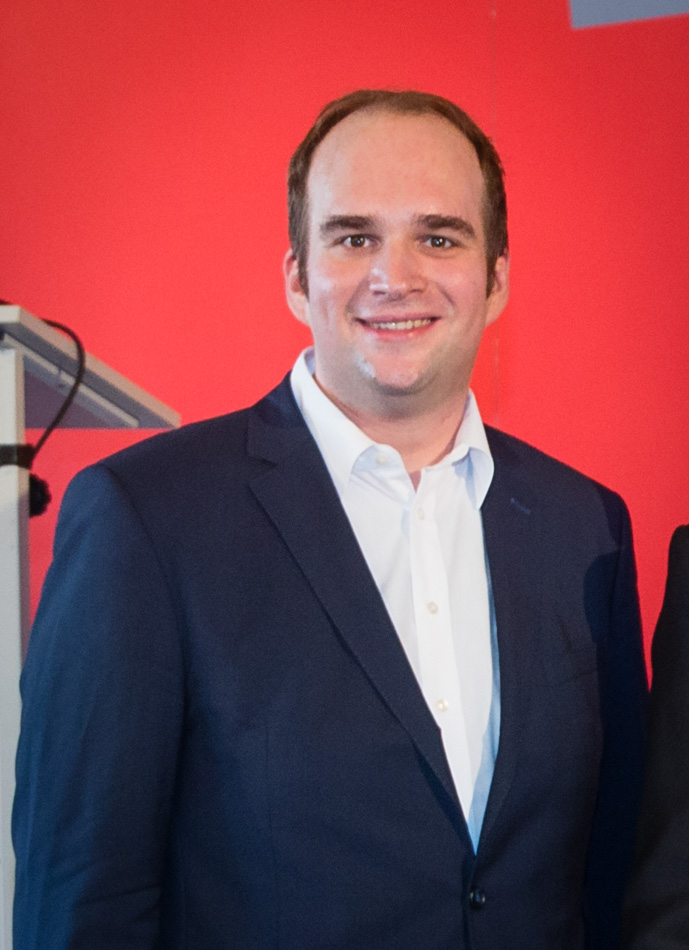
- Roloff in 2017

Member of the Bundestag
- Incumbent
- Assumed office 24 October 2021
- Constituency: Bavaria

Personal details
- Born: 28 January 1983 (age 43) Berlin
- Party: Social Democratic Party
- Education: University of Regensburg

Sebastian Roloff (born 28 January 1983) is a German lawyer and politician of the Social Democratic Party (SPD) who has been serving as a member of the Bundestag since October 2021, representing the constituency of Munich south.

== Early life and career ==
Roloff was born 1983 in Berlin, but grew up in Eastern Bavaria (Rettenbach/Landkreis Cham). After visiting the Joseph von Fraunhofer Gymnasium Cham, he served in the local hospital of Wörth an der Donau and then studied law at the University of Regensburg. After working as a lawyer with trade union IG Metall in Munich from 2011 to 2019, Roloff held various positions in human resources at MAN Truck & Bus from 2019 to 2021 (the last being Senior Vice President Human Resources) before his election to the Bundestag.

== Political career ==
=== Early beginnings ===
Roloff joined the SPD in 1999. He held several positions on the local level as well as being deputy federal chairman of the social democratic youth organization Jusos from 2011 until 2013. While studying, he was active in the students' union, being the chair of the students' parliament at the University of Regensburg from 2005 until 2008. In 2017 he ran for parliament in the constituency of Munich south for the first time.

=== Member of the German Parliament, 2021–present ===
Roloff was first elected to the Bundestag in the 2021 elections.

In parliament, Roloff has since been serving on the Committee on Economic Affairs. In this capacity, he is his parliamentary group’s rapporteur on self-employment and postal services, for the air and space industry, materials, the building industry, reduction of bureaucracy, competition law, transformation of the car industry and principles of economical policy. He is a deputy member of the Committee on Legal Affairs and a deputy member of the Committee for the Scrutiny of Elections, Immunity, and the Rules of Procedure.

Within his parliamentary group, Roloff belongs to the Parliamentary Left, a left-wing movement. In September 2021 he was elected co-chair of the left wing of the social democratic party Forum DL 21.

In the negotiations to form a Grand Coalition under the leadership of Friedrich Merz's Christian Democrats (CDU together with the Bavarian CSU) and the SPD following the 2025 German elections, Roloff was part of the SPD delegation in the working group on economic affairs, industry and tourism, led by Jens Spahn, Hansjörg Durz and Alexander Schweitzer.

== Other activities ==
=== Corporate boards ===
- Knorr-Bremse, Member of the Supervisory Board (2014–2019)

=== Non-profit organizations ===
- Georg von Vollmar Academy, Member of the Board of Trustees (since 2020)
- Union of Persecutees of the Nazi Regime, Member
- IG Metall, Member

In 2013 Roloff has been appointed as an honorary judge to the Labour Law Court Munich. Since 2018 he serves as an honorary judge at the State Labour Court of Munich.
