= Munich South (electoral district) =

Federal electoral district of Germany

218 Munich South
- Electoral district for the Bundestag
- Munich South in 2025
- State: Bavaria
- Population: 340,200 (2019)
- Electorate: 214,606 (2021)
- Major settlements: Munich (partial)
- Area: 52.5 km^{2}

Current electoral district
- Created: 1949
- Party: None
- Member: Vacant
- Elected: 2025

Munich South (German: München-Süd) is an electoral constituency (German: Wahlkreis) represented in the Bundestag. It elects one member via first-past-the-post voting. Under the current constituency numbering system, it is designated as constituency 218. It is located in southern Bavaria, comprising the southern part of the city of Munich.

Munich South was created for the inaugural 1949 federal election. Whilst the Christian Social Union won the plurality in the 2025 election, under the new voting system, their candidate did not actually win a seat in the Bundestag. This was due to the distribution of seats won by the CSU being decided by the first (direct) vote percentage of each winning CSU candidate, determining who took the seats. As the CSU candidate got a low vote of 30.4%, the seat will remain vacant throughout the 21st Bundestag.

== Geography ==
Munich South is located in southern Bavaria. As of the 2021 federal election, it comprises the boroughs of Sendling (6), Sendling-Westpark (7), Obergiesing (17), Untergiesing-Harlaching (18), Thalkirchen-Obersendling-Forstenried-Fürstenried-Solln (19), and Hadern (20) from the independent city of Munich.

== History ==
Munich South was created in 1949. In the 1949 election, it was Bavaria constituency 7 in the numbering system. In the 1953 through 1961 elections, it was number 202. In the 1965 through 1976 elections, it was number 207. In the 1980 through 1998 elections, it was number 206. In the 2002 and 2005 elections, it was number 221. In the 2009 and 2013 elections, it was number 220. In the 2017 and 2021 elections, it was number 219. From the 2025 election, it has been number 218.

Originally, the constituency comprised the boroughs of Altstadt, Au, Forstenried, Fürstenried, Hadern, Isarvorstadt, Ludwigsvorstadt, Obersendling, Sendling, Solln, and Thalkirchen. In the 1965 through 1972 elections, comprised the boroughs of Forstenried, Fürstenried, Giesing, Hadern, Harlaching, Obersendling, Thalkirchen, Sendling, and Solln. In the 1976 election, it lost the borough of Sendling and gained the borough of Mittersendling. It acquired its current borders in the 2002 election.

Election	No.	Name	Borders
1949	7	München-Süd	Munich city (only Altstadt, Au, Forstenried, Fürstenried, Hadern, Isarvorstadt, Ludwigsvorstadt, Obersendling, Sendling, Solln, and Thalkirchen boroughs)
1953	202	München-Süd	Munich city (only Altstadt, Au, Forstenried, Fürstenried, Hadern, Isarvorstadt, Ludwigsvorstadt, Obersendling, Sendling, Solln, and Thalkirchen boroughs)
1957	202	München-Süd	Munich city (only Altstadt, Au, Forstenried, Fürstenried, Hadern, Isarvorstadt, Ludwigsvorstadt, Obersendling, Sendling, Solln, and Thalkirchen boroughs)
1961	202	München-Süd	Munich city (only Altstadt, Au, Forstenried, Fürstenried, Hadern, Isarvorstadt, Ludwigsvorstadt, Obersendling, Sendling, Solln, and Thalkirchen boroughs)
1965	207	München-Süd	Munich city (only Forstenried, Fürstenried, Giesing, Hadern, Harlaching, Obersendling, Thalkirchen, Sendling, and Solln boroughs)
1969	207	München-Süd	Munich city (only Forstenried, Fürstenried, Giesing, Hadern, Harlaching, Obersendling, Thalkirchen, Sendling, and Solln boroughs)
1972	207	München-Süd	Munich city (only Forstenried, Fürstenried, Giesing, Hadern, Harlaching, Obersendling, Thalkirchen, Sendling, and Solln boroughs)
1976	207	München-Süd	Munich city (only Forstenried, Fürstenried, Giesing, Hadern, Harlaching, Mittersendling, Obersendling, Thalkirchen, and Solln boroughs)
1980	206	München-Süd	Munich city (only Forstenried, Fürstenried, Giesing, Hadern, Harlaching, Mittersendling, Obersendling, Thalkirchen, and Solln boroughs)
1983	206	München-Süd	Munich city (only Forstenried, Fürstenried, Giesing, Hadern, Harlaching, Mittersendling, Obersendling, Thalkirchen, and Solln boroughs)
1987	206	München-Süd	Munich city (only Forstenried, Fürstenried, Giesing, Hadern, Harlaching, Mittersendling, Obersendling, Thalkirchen, and Solln boroughs)
1990	206	München-Süd	Munich city (only Forstenried, Fürstenried, Giesing, Hadern, Harlaching, Mittersendling, Obersendling, Thalkirchen, and Solln boroughs)
1994	206	München-Süd	Munich city (only Forstenried, Fürstenried, Giesing, Hadern, Harlaching, Mittersendling, Obersendling, Thalkirchen, and Solln boroughs)
1998	206	München-Süd	Munich city (only Forstenried, Fürstenried, Giesing, Hadern, Harlaching, Mittersendling, Obersendling, Thalkirchen, and Solln boroughs)
2002	221	München-Süd	Munich city (only Sendling (6), Sendling-Westpark (7), Obergiesing (17), Untergiesing-Harlaching (18), Thalkirchen-Obersendling-Forstenried-Fürstenried-Solln (19), and Hadern (20) boroughs)
2005	221	München-Süd	Munich city (only Sendling (6), Sendling-Westpark (7), Obergiesing (17), Untergiesing-Harlaching (18), Thalkirchen-Obersendling-Forstenried-Fürstenried-Solln (19), and Hadern (20) boroughs)
2009	220	München-Süd	Munich city (only Sendling (6), Sendling-Westpark (7), Obergiesing (17), Untergiesing-Harlaching (18), Thalkirchen-Obersendling-Forstenried-Fürstenried-Solln (19), and Hadern (20) boroughs)
2013	220	München-Süd	Munich city (only Sendling (6), Sendling-Westpark (7), Obergiesing (17), Untergiesing-Harlaching (18), Thalkirchen-Obersendling-Forstenried-Fürstenried-Solln (19), and Hadern (20) boroughs)
2017	219	München-Süd	Munich city (only Sendling (6), Sendling-Westpark (7), Obergiesing (17), Untergiesing-Harlaching (18), Thalkirchen-Obersendling-Forstenried-Fürstenried-Solln (19), and Hadern (20) boroughs)
2021	219	München-Süd	Munich city (only Sendling (6), Sendling-Westpark (7), Obergiesing (17), Untergiesing-Harlaching (18), Thalkirchen-Obersendling-Forstenried-Fürstenried-Solln (19), and Hadern (20) boroughs)
2025	218	München-Süd	Munich city (only Sendling (6), Sendling-Westpark (7), Obergiesing (17), Untergiesing-Harlaching (18), Thalkirchen-Obersendling-Forstenried-Fürstenried-Solln (19), and Hadern (20) boroughs)

== Members ==
The constituency was first represented by Max Wönner of the Social Democratic Party (SPD) from 1949 to 1953. Karl Wieninger of the Christian Social Union (CSU) was elected in 1953 and served until 1965. Günther Müller of the SPD won the constituency in 1965 and served until 1972. He was succeeded by fellow SPD member Rudolf Schöfberger from 1972 to 1976. Erich Riedl won the constituency for the CSU in 1976, and served until 1998. Christoph Moosbauer of the SPD was elected in 1998 and was representative for a single term. Peter Gauweiler regained it for the CSU in 2002 and served until 2017. Michael Kuffer of the CSU was elected in 2017. Jamila Schäfer won the constituency for the Greens in 2021. The seat became vacant as a result of the 2025 election.

Election	Member	Party	%
1949	Max Wönner	SPD	27.7
1953	Karl Wieninger	CSU	48.9
1957	Karl Wieninger	CSU	46.5
1961	Karl Wieninger	CSU	42.1
1965	Günther Müller	SPD	47.0
1969	Günther Müller	SPD	53.1
1972	Rudolf Schöfberger	SPD	50.3
1976	Erich Riedl	CSU	47.8
1980	Erich Riedl	CSU	44.4
1983	Erich Riedl	CSU	44.3
1987	Erich Riedl	CSU	43.9
1990	Erich Riedl	CSU	38.6
1994	Erich Riedl	CSU	45.0
1998	Christoph Moosbauer	SPD	42.0
2002	Peter Gauweiler	CSU	44.4
2005	Peter Gauweiler	CSU	44.0
2009	Peter Gauweiler	CSU	38.2
2013	Peter Gauweiler	CSU	43.4
2017	Michael Kuffer	CSU	33.0
2021	Jamila Schäfer	GRÜNE	27.5
2025	Vacant (Note: Claudia Küng (CSU) won with 30.4% but seat remained vacant due to insufficient second votes cover.)		

== Election results ==
=== 2025 election ===
Under the new voting system implemented for the 2025 election, although the CSU candidate won the most votes in this constituency, due to the low winning percentage, the constituency seat will remain vacant as not enough second (party) votes were won to be allocated this seat.

Federal election (2025): Munich South
Notes:	Blue background denotes the winner of the electorate vote. Pink background denotes a candidate elected from their party list. Yellow background denotes an electorate win by a list member, or other incumbent. A ✓ or ✗ denotes status of any incumbent, win or lose respectively.						
Party	Candidate	Votes	%	±%	Party votes	%	±%
CSU	Claudia Küng	54,803	30.4	▲3.6	51,845	28.7	▲5.2
Greens	✗ Jamila Schäfer	53,695	29.8	▲2.3	43,483	24.1	▼2.3
SPD	Sebastian Jörg Roloff	26,427	14.6	▼5.1	28,005	15.5	▼3.7
AfD	Wolfgang Wiehle	15,864	8.8	▲4.4	16,773	9.3	▲4.7
Left	Carmen Maria Elisabeth Fesl	9,819	5.4	▲1.8	16,846	9.3	▲4.9
FDP	Julika Muriel Sandt	7,163	4.0	▼5.6	10,046	5.6	▼6.9
BSW	Klaus Friedrich Ernst	4,588	2.5		5,582	3.1	
Volt	Massimo Ferraro	2,778	1.5		2,268	1.3	▲0.4
FW	Loraine Sunshine Bender-Schwering	2,357	1.3	▼1.3	2,086	1.2	▼1.6
APT	Norbert Maria Penstetter	1,641	0.9	▼0.6	1,324	0.7	▼0.3
PARTEI	Barbara Rebecca Anja Hinkelbein	1,167	0.6	▼0.5	804	0.4	▼0.3
ÖDP					652	0.4	▼0.4
dieBasis					392	0.2	▼1.2
Humanists					173	0.1	Steady
BP					153	0.1	▼0.1
BD					104	0.1	
MLPD	Patrick Ziegler	102	0.1	Steady	53	0.0	Steady
Informal votes		629			444		
Total valid votes		180,404			180,589		
Turnout		181,033	84.2	▲3.7			
Vacant gain from Greens	Majority						

=== 2021 election ===
Federal election (2021): Munich South
Notes:	Blue background denotes the winner of the electorate vote. Pink background denotes a candidate elected from their party list. Yellow background denotes an electorate win by a list member, or other incumbent. A ✓ or ✗ denotes status of any incumbent, win or lose respectively.						
Party	Candidate	Votes	%	±%	Party votes	%	±%
Greens	Jamila Schäfer	47,256	27.5	▲13.7	45,562	26.4	▲9.0
CSU	✗ Michael Kuffer	46,059	26.8	▼6.2	40,585	23.5	▼6.3
SPD	Sebastian Roloff	33,924	19.7	▼3.8	33,117	19.2	▲3.0
FDP	Thomas Sattelberger	16,437	9.6	▲0.5	21,495	12.5	▼0.8
AfD	Wolfgang Wiehle	7,641	4.4	▼3.2	7,910	4.6	▼4.0
Left	Kerem Schamberger	6,236	3.6	▼3.8	7,669	4.4	▼4.2
FW	Loraine Bender-Schwering	4,464	2.6	▲0.9	4,724	2.7	▲1.6
dieBasis	Anna Petukova	2,668	1.6		2,388	1.4	
Tierschutzpartei	Stephanie Weiser	2,610	1.5		1,711	1.0	▲0.1
Volt					1,497	0.9	
ÖDP	Martina Bonertz	2,532	1.5	▼0.1	1,306	0.8	▼0.1
PARTEI	Anja Mebes	2,060	1.2	▼0.2	1,299	0.8	▼0.2
Team Todenhöfer					1,000	0.6	
Pirates					608	0.4	▼0.1
BP					357	0.2	▼0.3
V-Partei3					197	0.1	▼0.1
Unabhängige					184	0.1	
Humanists					172	0.1	
du.					165	0.1	
Gesundheitsforschung					145	0.1	0.0
BüSo	Christa Kaiser	133	0.1	0.0			
Bündnis C					83	0.0	
DKP					45	0.0	0.0
MLPD	Patrick Ziegler	109	0.1	0.0	44	0.0	0.0
NPD					40	0.0	▼0.1
LKR					36	0.0	
The III. Path					32	0.0	
Informal votes		841			599		
Total valid votes		172,129			172,371		
Turnout		172,970	80.6	▲1.9			
Greens gain from CSU	Majority	1,197	0.7				

=== 2017 election ===
Federal election (2017): Munich South
Notes:	Blue background denotes the winner of the electorate vote. Pink background denotes a candidate elected from their party list. Yellow background denotes an electorate win by a list member, or other incumbent. A ✓ or ✗ denotes status of any incumbent, win or lose respectively.						
Party	Candidate	Votes	%	±%	Party votes	%	±%
CSU	Michael Kuffer	55,894	33.0	▼10.4	50,686	29.8	▼8.0
SPD	Sebastian Roloff	39,873	23.5	▼4.9	27,500	16.2	▼7.8
Greens	Peter Heilrath	23,343	13.8	▲2.4	29,560	17.4	▲3.4
FDP	Thomas Sattelberger	15,332	9.1	▲6.0	22,587	13.3	▲6.3
AfD	Wolfgang Wiehle	12,921	7.6	▲4.6	14,578	8.6	▲4.0
Left	Nicole Gohlke	12,611	7.4	▲3.5	14,694	8.7	▲3.9
FW	Günther Görlich	2,803	1.7	▼0.2	1,982	1.2	▼0.5
ÖDP	Michael Schabl	2,679	1.6	▼0.1	1,458	0.9	▼0.1
PARTEI	Gerhard Bruckner	2,415	1.4		1,655	1.0	
Tierschutzpartei					1,467	0.9	▲0.2
BP	Alexander Müller	1,190	0.7		890	0.5	▼0.2
Pirates					719	0.4	▼2.2
DiB					625	0.4	
BGE					378	0.2	
V-Partei³					344	0.2	
DM					241	0.1	
Gesundheitsforschung					157	0.1	
NPD					144	0.1	▼0.3
MLPD	Marion Schmidt	164	0.1		79	0.0	0.0
BüSo	Christa Kaiser	172	0.1	0.0	50	0.0	0.0
DKP					30	0.0	
Informal votes		1,086			659		
Total valid votes		169,397			169,824		
Turnout		170,483	78.7	▲7.1			
CSU hold	Majority	16,021	9.5	▼5.5			

=== 2013 election ===
Federal election (2013): Munich South
Notes:	Blue background denotes the winner of the electorate vote. Pink background denotes a candidate elected from their party list. Yellow background denotes an electorate win by a list member, or other incumbent. A ✓ or ✗ denotes status of any incumbent, win or lose respectively.						
Party	Candidate	Votes	%	±%	Party votes	%	±%
CSU	✓ Peter Gauweiler	66,513	43.4	▲5.2	58,097	37.9	▲4.9
SPD	Christian Vorländer	43,571	28.4	0.0	36,877	24.0	▲4.4
Greens	Jerzy Montag	17,407	11.4	▼1.9	21,440	14.0	▼3.0
Left	Nicole Gohlke	6,027	3.9	▼1.4	7,341	4.8	▼2.1
AfD	Andre Röhm	4,661	3.0		7,082	4.6	
FDP	Randhir Dindoyal	4,650	3.0	▼8.0	10,727	7.0	▼9.6
Pirates	Nikolaus Jaroslawsky	3,950	2.6		4,003	2.6	▲0.3
FW	Martin Blasi	2,912	1.9		2,493	1.6	
ÖDP	Sebastian Frankenberger	2,598	1.7	▲0.3	1,418	0.9	▲0.1
Tierschutzpartei					1,092	0.7	▲0.1
BP					1,088	0.7	▲0.2
NPD	Renate Werlberger	744	0.5	▼0.4	632	0.4	▼0.3
REP					283	0.2	▼0.1
DIE FRAUEN					256	0.2	
DIE VIOLETTEN					224	0.1	▼0.1
Party of Reason					125	0.1	
PRO					82	0.1	
BüSo	Christa Kaiser	138	0.1	▼0.2	49	0.0	▼0.1
RRP					46	0.0	▼0.7
MLPD					42	0.0	0.0
Informal votes		975			749		
Total valid votes		153,171			153,397		
Turnout		154,146	71.6	▼2.0			
CSU hold	Majority	22,942	15.0	▲5.2			

=== 2009 election ===
Federal election (2009): Munich South
Notes:	Blue background denotes the winner of the electorate vote. Pink background denotes a candidate elected from their party list. Yellow background denotes an electorate win by a list member, or other incumbent. A ✓ or ✗ denotes status of any incumbent, win or lose respectively.						
Party	Candidate	Votes	%	±%	Party votes	%	±%
CSU	✓ Peter Gauweiler	58,849	38.2	▼5.8	51,064	33.0	▼5.5
SPD	Christian Vorländer	43,835	28.4	▼8.6	30,403	19.7	▼9.5
Greens	Jerzy Montag	20,507	13.3	▲5.1	26,219	17.0	▲3.4
FDP	Richard Ladewig	17,033	11.1	▲5.1	25,600	15.6	▲4.6
Left	Michael Wendl	8,266	5.4	▲2.7	10,603	6.9	▲3.0
Pirates					3,624	2.3	
ÖDP	Conrad Lausberg	2,097	1.4		1,236	0.8	
RRP					1,176	0.8	
NPD	Renate Werlberger	1,289	0.8	▼0.1	1,073	0.7	▼0.1
Independent	Sven Steinmeyer	1,167	0.8				
Tierschutzpartei					1,005	0.6	
BP					813	0.5	▲0.2
Independent	Maria Frank	617	0.4				
REP					503	0.3	▼0.1
FAMILIE					493	0.3	▼0.1
DIE VIOLETTEN					325	0.2	
PBC					153	0.1	0.0
BüSo	Christa Kaiser	460	0.3	0.0	148	0.1	0.0
CM					111	0.1	
DVU					63	0.0	
MLPD					54	0.0	0.0
Informal votes		1,546			1,000		
Total valid votes		154,120			154,666		
Turnout		155,666	73.6	▼3.4			
CSU hold	Majority	15,014	9.8	▲2.8			

=== 2005 election ===
Federal election (2005):Munich South
Notes:	Blue background denotes the winner of the electorate vote. Pink background denotes a candidate elected from their party list. Yellow background denotes an electorate win by a list member, or other incumbent. A ✓ or ✗ denotes status of any incumbent, win or lose respectively.						
Party	Candidate	Votes	%	±%	Party votes	%	±%
CSU	✓ Peter Gauweiler	67,133	44.0	▼0.4	58,952	38.5	▼7.1
SPD	Brigitte Meier	56,508	37.0	▼4.4	44,729	29.2	▼0.7
Greens	Jerzy Montag	12,470	8.2	▲04	20,697	13.5	▼1.5
FDP	Julika Sandt	9,134	6.0	▲1.7	18,372	12.0	▲6.0
Left	Michaele Siebe	4.,099	2.7	▲1.8	5,953	3.9	▲2.6
Familie	Alexandra Scherer	1,518	1.0		703	0.5	
NPD	Rüdiger Schrembs	1,363	0.9		1,198	0.8	▲0.6
GRAUEN					719	0.5	▲0.3
REP					598	0.4	0.0
BP					523	0.3	▲0.2
BüSo	Christa Kaiser	441	0.3	▲0.1	193	0.1	▲0.1
Feminist					258	0.2	▲0.1
PBC					205	0.3	▲0.1
MLPD					73	0.0	
Informal votes		1,720			1,213		
Total valid votes		152,666			153,173		
Turnout		154,386	77.0	▼3.8			
CSU hold	Majority	10,625	7				
