= Jamila Schäfer =

German politician (born 1993)

Jamila Schäfer MdB
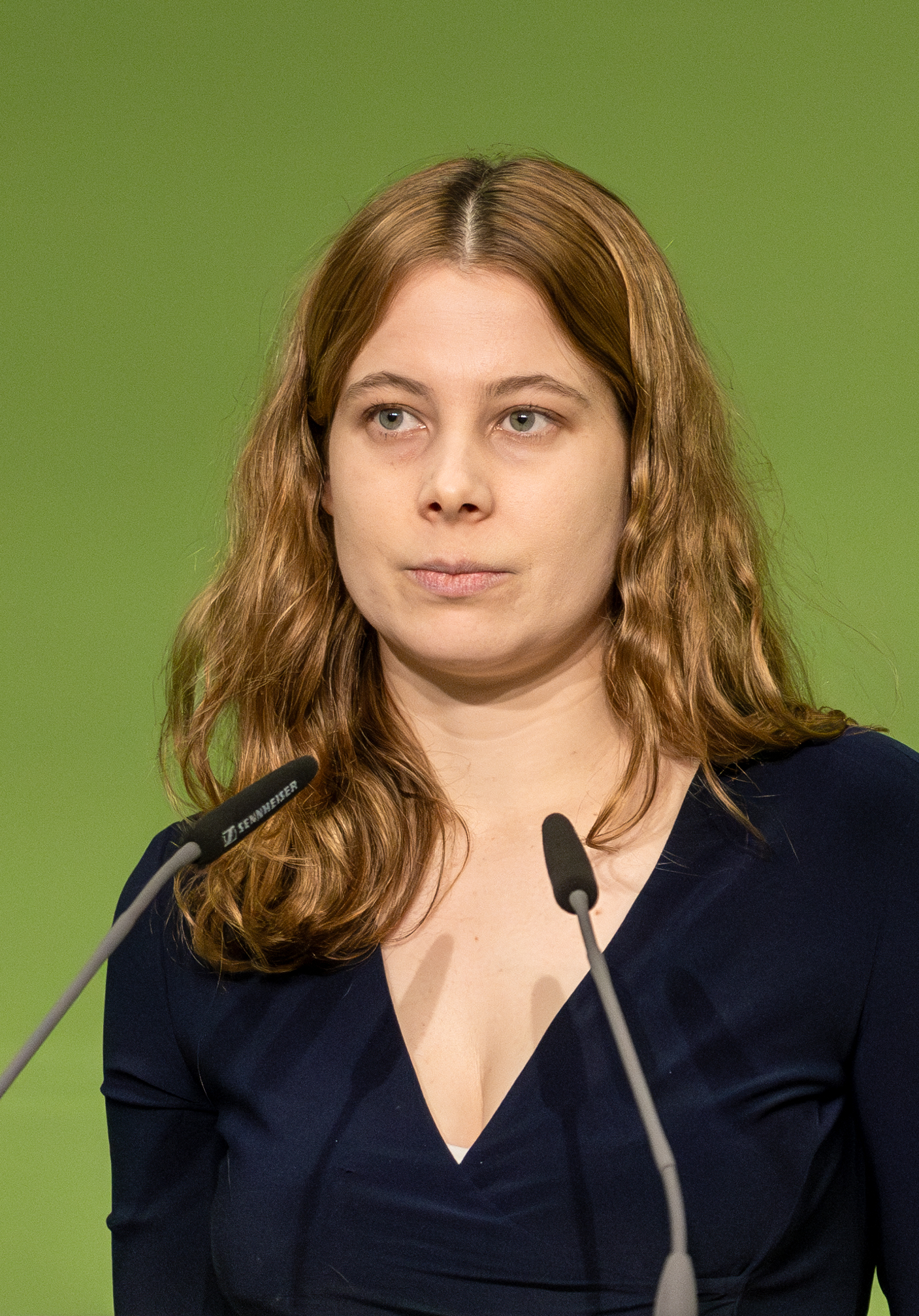
- Schäfer in 2024

Member of the Bundestag; from Bavaria
- Incumbent
- Assumed office 26 October 2021
- Preceded by: Michael Kuffer
- Constituency: Munich South (2021–2025); State list (2025–present)

Personal details
- Born: 30 April 1993 (age 33) Munich, Germany
- Party: Alliance 90/The Greens
- Children: 1
- Education: LMU Munich

Jamila Anna Schäfer (born 30 April 1993) is a German politician of Alliance 90/The Greens who has been serving as a member of the German Bundestag since the 2021 elections, representing the Munich South district. From 2018 to 2022 she served as one of her party's deputy chairs, under the leadership of Annalena Baerbock and Robert Habeck.

== Early life ==
Born to a physiotherapist and a computer scientist, Schäfer grew up in Munich’s Großhadern district. In October 2011, Schäfer joined the Green Youth, the youth organization of Alliance 90/The Greens, as part of protests against the eight-year high school system. In 2012 she started a law degree at LMU Munich, which she did not complete. Since 2013 she is studying sociology with a minor in philosophy at LMU Munich and Goethe University Frankfurt which she had not completed as of February 2022.

== Political career ==
From 2015 to 2017, Schäfer served as chair of the Green Youth, the Green Party’s youth organisation.

From 2018 to 2022, Schäfer was part of the Green Party’s national leadership around co-chairs Annalena Baerbock and Robert Habeck, where she coordinated the party’s activities on European and international affairs.

Schäfer was elected Member of the Bundestag for Munich South in the 2021 German federal election, and was the only non-CSU member of the Bundestag from Bavaria elected in a constituency seat.

In the negotiations to form a so-called traffic light coalition of the Social Democratic Party (SPD), the Green Party and the Free Democratic Party (FDP) following the elections, Schäfer was part of her party's delegation in the working group on European affairs, co-chaired by Udo Bullmann, Franziska Brantner and Nicola Beer.

In parliament, Schäfer has been serving on the Budget Committee (since 2021), the Committee on Foreign Affairs (since 2021) and the Subcommittee on the United Nations (since 2022). On the Budget Committee, she is her parliamentary group’s rapporteur on the annual budget of the Federal Foreign Office. She is also a member of the so-called Confidential Committee (Vertrauensgremium) of the Budget Committee, which provides budgetary supervision for Germany's three intelligence services, BND, BfV and MAD.

== Other activities ==
- Heinrich Böll Foundation, Member of the General Assembly

== Political positions ==
Within the Green Party, Schäfer is considered to be part of its left wing. She is a vegetarian.

== Personal life ==
Schäfer lives in Berlin’s Weissensee district.
