= Iris Eberl =

German politician

Member of the Bundestag; for Munich South
- In office 10 April 2015 – 24 October 2017
- Preceded by: Peter Gauweiler
- Succeeded by: Michael Kuffer

Personal details
- Born: 21 July 1958 (age 68) Schrobenhausen, West Germany
- Party: Christian Social Union
- Children: 2
- Education: LMU Munich

Iris Eberl (21 July 1958) is a politician from the Christian Social Union, the Bavarian branch of the party known as the Christian Democratic Union in the other German states. She ran unsuccessfully for the 2013 German federal election (the 18th Bundestag), being the 41st candidate on her state's list of candidates (the so-called State list), of which only 40 won a seat, but entered parliament on 10 April 2015 following the resignation of Peter Gauweiler. She reportedly found out about her seat while on holiday in Mauritius, calling it the "crowning achievement of her political work".

== Biography ==
Eberl was born on 21 July 1958. After graduating (Abitur) from the Maria-Theresia-Gymnasium in Augsburg in 1978, she studied mathematics and economics at LMU Munich from 1978 to 1985 and worked as a teacher at the Deutschherren-Gymnasium in Aichach. She has been chairwoman of her district's Frauen-Union the women's wing of her party, since 1999. She is married and has two children.
