= Erich Riedl =

German politician (1933–2018)

Member of the Bundestag; from Bavaria
- In office 20 October 1969 – 26 October 1998
- Preceded by: Multi-member district
- Succeeded by: Christoph Moosbauer
- Constituency: State list (1969–1976); Munich South (1976–1998)

Personal details
- Born: 23 June 1933 Cheb, Czechoslovakia
- Died: 8 September 2018 (aged 85) Munich, Germany
- Party: Christian Social Union
- Children: 3
- Education: University of Erlangen–Nuremberg

Erich Riedl (23 June 1933 – 8 September 2018) was a German politician, representing the Christian Social Union in Bavaria (CSU). He was the parliamentary state secretary for the Federal Ministry for Economic Affairs and Energy from 1987 to 1993.

== Early career ==
After the expulsion of his family from the Sudetenland, Riedl completed his Abitur in Münchberg in Upper Franconia in 1952 and subsequently became an inspector for the German Federal Post Office. Until 1959, he worked as a Post-Inspector at the Postscheckamt in Nuremberg. Riedl studied business administration alongside his work, and was subsequently taken over to the higher postal service. In 1962, he earned his doctorate. At the University of Erlangen-Nuremberg, he worked on banking supervision in the transport industry, especially in Germany.

In 1965 Riedl became political spokesman of the Federal Ministry for Post and Telecommunications under Richard Stücklen (during the first cabinet of Ludwig Erhard). Stücklen, who held the office from 1957 to 1966, became chairman of the CSU group in January 1967; Riedl was, from 1966 to 1969, Stücklen's personal spokesman.

== Political career ==
Riedl was a member of the Bundestag from 1969 to 1998. In 1969 and 1972, he was elected to the Bundestag via the Bavarian national list, and was subsequently a directly elected representative from the Munich South electoral district. From 1971 to 1994, Riedl was deputy chairman of the CSU in Munich. He was also Deputy Chairman of the Committee on Budgets from 1982 to 1987.

After the West German federal election of 1987, Riedl was appointed parliamentary Secretary of State to the Federal Ministry for Economic Affairs and Energy, during the chancellorship of Helmut Kohl. He left office on 22 January 1993 in a cabinet reshuffle and was succeeded by Reinhard Göhner (CDU). During this period he served under three economy ministers: Martin Bangemann, Helmut Haussmann and Jürgen Möllemann, all from the Free Democratic Party (FDP).

At the 1998 Bundestag election, Riedl lost his constituency to Christoph Moosbauer (SPD) and left the Bundestag.

=== Tax investigation ===
Due to the suspicion of the advantage with tax collectors around Karlheinz Schreiber in 1996, his immunity as a Bundestag deputy was lifted; the Augsburg public prosecutor ordered his house to be searched. On 14 November 1997, the Bundestag restored his immunity after the investigation by the Augsburg prosecutors failed. Later, the prosecutors office in Augsburg had to cease the investigation against Riedl in accordance with § 170 Abs.2 of the Strafgesetzbuch for nolle prosequi.

In 2009, author Wilhelm Schlötterer published a book entitled Macht und Missbrauch Von Strauß bis Seehofer - Ein Insider packt aus (English: Power and Abuse from Strauss to Seehofer - an insider speaks out), which alleged that on 29 October 1996, the Chief Prosecutor informed the Attorney General that the investigating prosecutor would cease the proceedings against Riedl. The Bavarian Minister of Justice at that time, Hermann Leeb, forbade the competent prosecutor to stop the investigations.

By November 1997, the Bundestag restored Riedl's immunity beyond all factional borders. After the Bundestag elections in 1998, Riedl was no longer a member of parliament and therefore had no immunity, and the investigation against him was reopened and kept open until March 2000, though there was no new evidence or any investigations against him.

== Business activities ==
From 1974 to 1981, he was the president of the football club TSV 1860 Munich and led the club temporarily back into the Bundesliga; he is regarded as partly responsible for a license withdrawal in summer 1982, which resulted in the forcible demotion of the team to the Bayernliga.

Riedl later became a government consultant in Angola. From June 2014 to his death, he was the first chairman of the German-Angolan Economic Initiative (DAWI).

== Personal life and death ==
Riedl was married and had three children. He died on 8 September 2018.
