= Großhadern =

District in Munich, Bavaria

Coordinates: 48°07′N 11°28′E

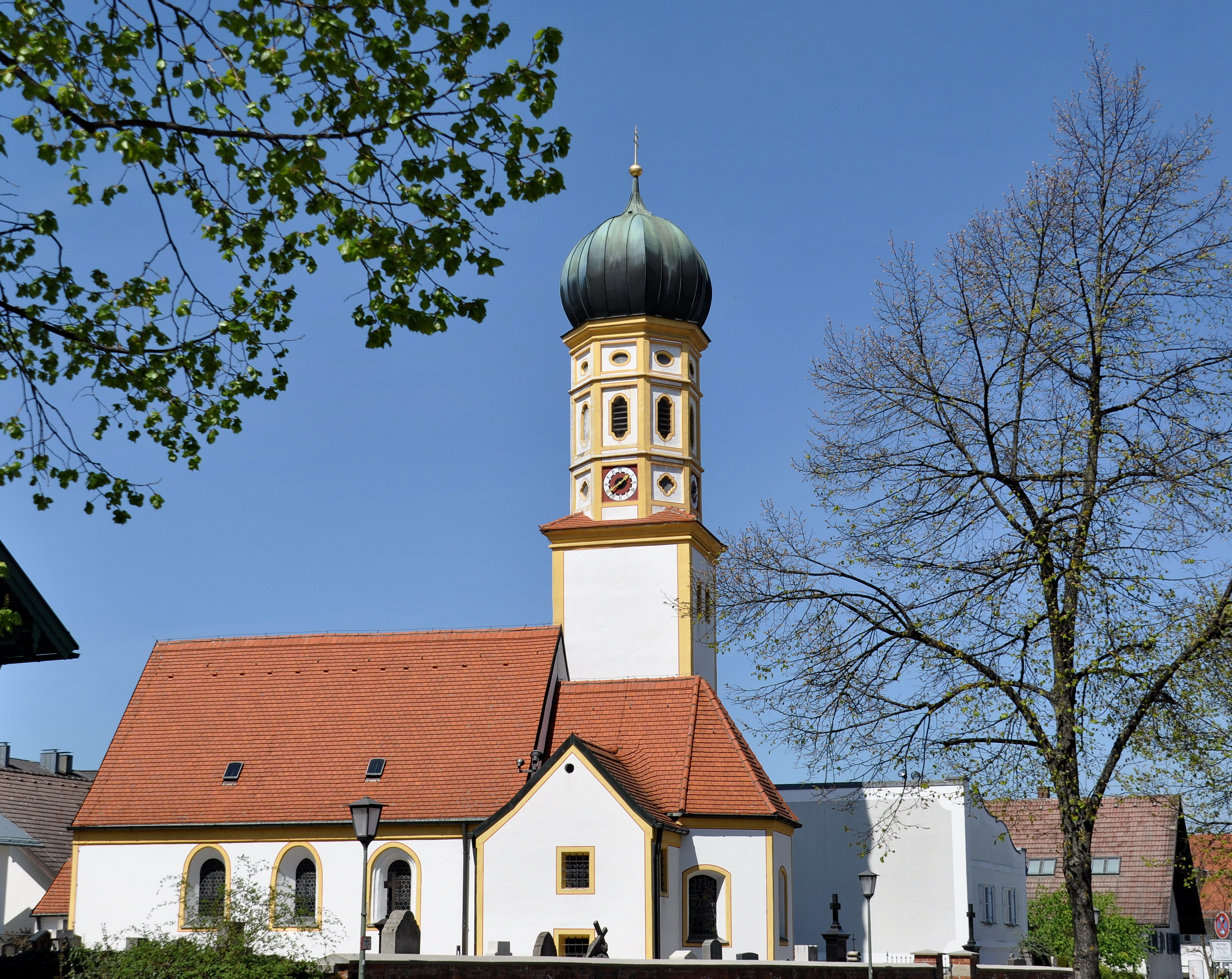
St. Peter village church

Großhadern (in the town district Hadern) is a district in the south-west of the Bavarian state capital Munich. Großhadern is primarily a bourgeois residential area. Exceptions are the so-called "village core" with numerous small shops as well as the university district around the Klinikum Großhadern. This includes several student halls and three football fields. The number of restaurants and beer gardens is also remarkably high. In the south-west of Großhadern, between the subway station "Klinikum Großhadern" and the adjacent forest, a new settlement is being built on a former field with owned and rented apartments as well as some shops. Many of the houses are already finished and lived in. The old church of St. Peter (built in 1315, renovated in the 17th century) is located in the village center, not far from it, the parish church of St. Canisius, built in 1925, with the Stations of the Cross by Kaspar Schleibner. The Protestant church has its home in the Reformation Memorial Church. A large part of the Großhadern area is in the south-west of the Waldfriedhof.

== Publicity ==
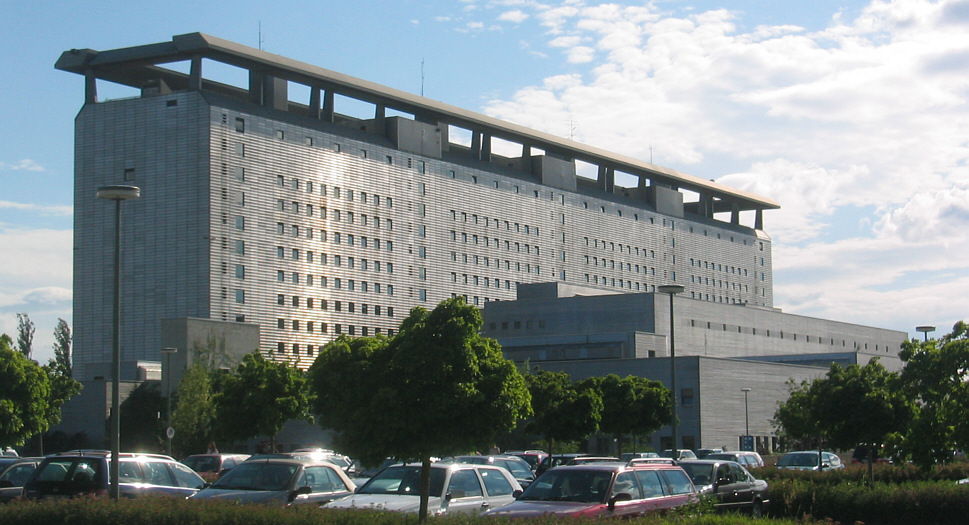
Klinikum Großhadern

Großhadern is known for:

- TSV Munich Großhadern, which has made a name for itself in Judo (Olympic support basis, with numerous international successes)
- Klinikum Großhadern of LMU Munich and adjoining High-Tech Campus (Uni.)
- Hadern village fete
- Heiglhoftheater

== Location ==
Großhadern is located southwest of the city center. The following are adjacent districts:

- Laim
- Forstenried
- Fürstenried
- Pasing
- Gräfelfing
- Sendling-Westpark
- Martinsried
- Neuried
- Kleinhadern
- Neuhadern
- Blumenau

== History ==
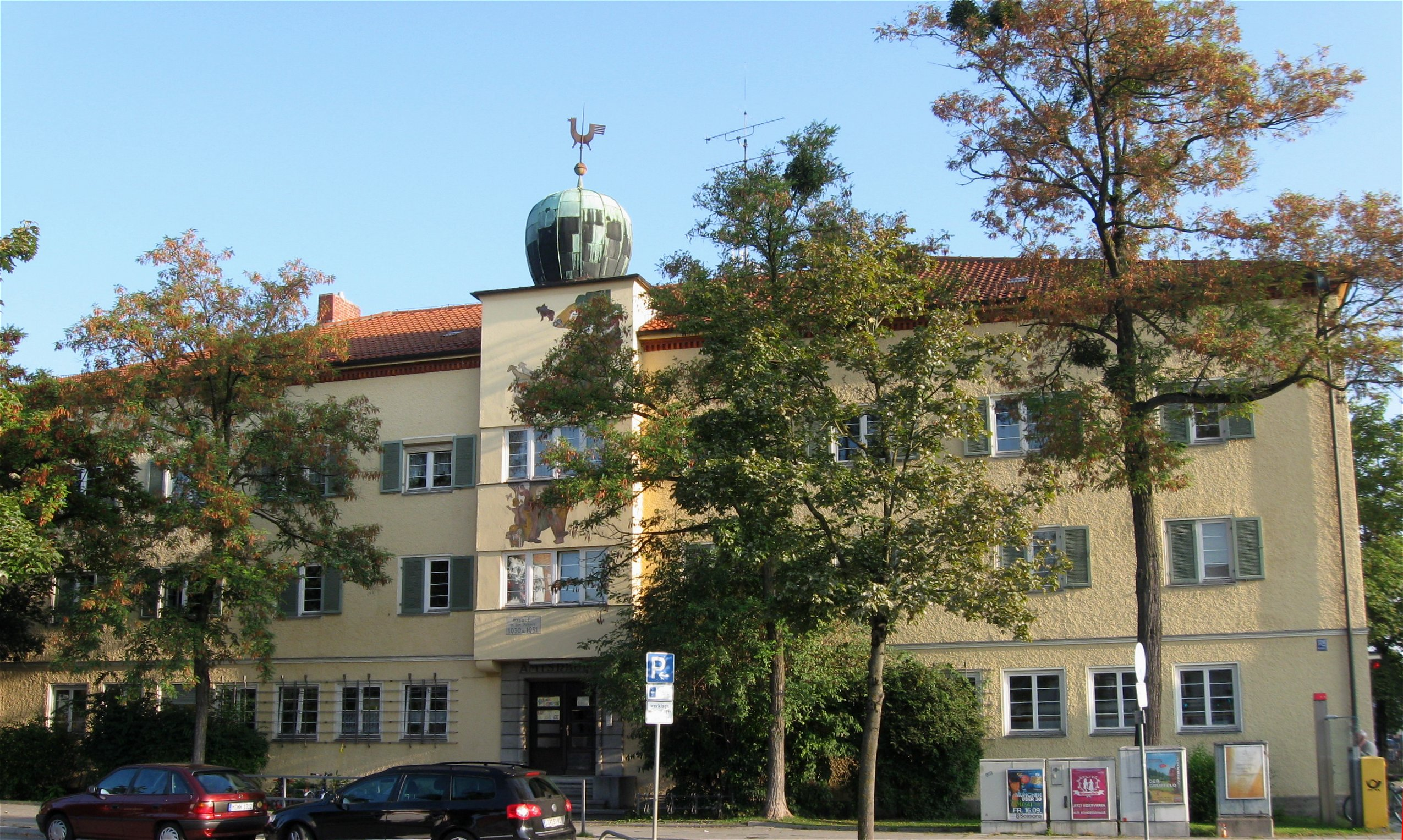
Großhadern Town Hall

Großhadern Town Hall was completed in 1931. On 1 April 1938, the largely independent municipality of Großhadern was integrated into the city of Munich.

== Traffic Connections ==
=== Highway ===
- A96, exit Blumenau / Großhadern

=== Subway ===
- Line U6: Großhadern, Klinikum Großhadern

=== Bus ===
- Metro Bus line 54: 4 stops
- Metro bus line 56: 7 stops
- City Bus line 167: 8 stops
- Regional bus line 266: 4 stops
- Regional bus line 268: 7 stops
- Regional bus line 269: 2 stops
