= Großhadern Town Hall =

Town hall in Großhadern, Germany

- Rathaus Großhadern
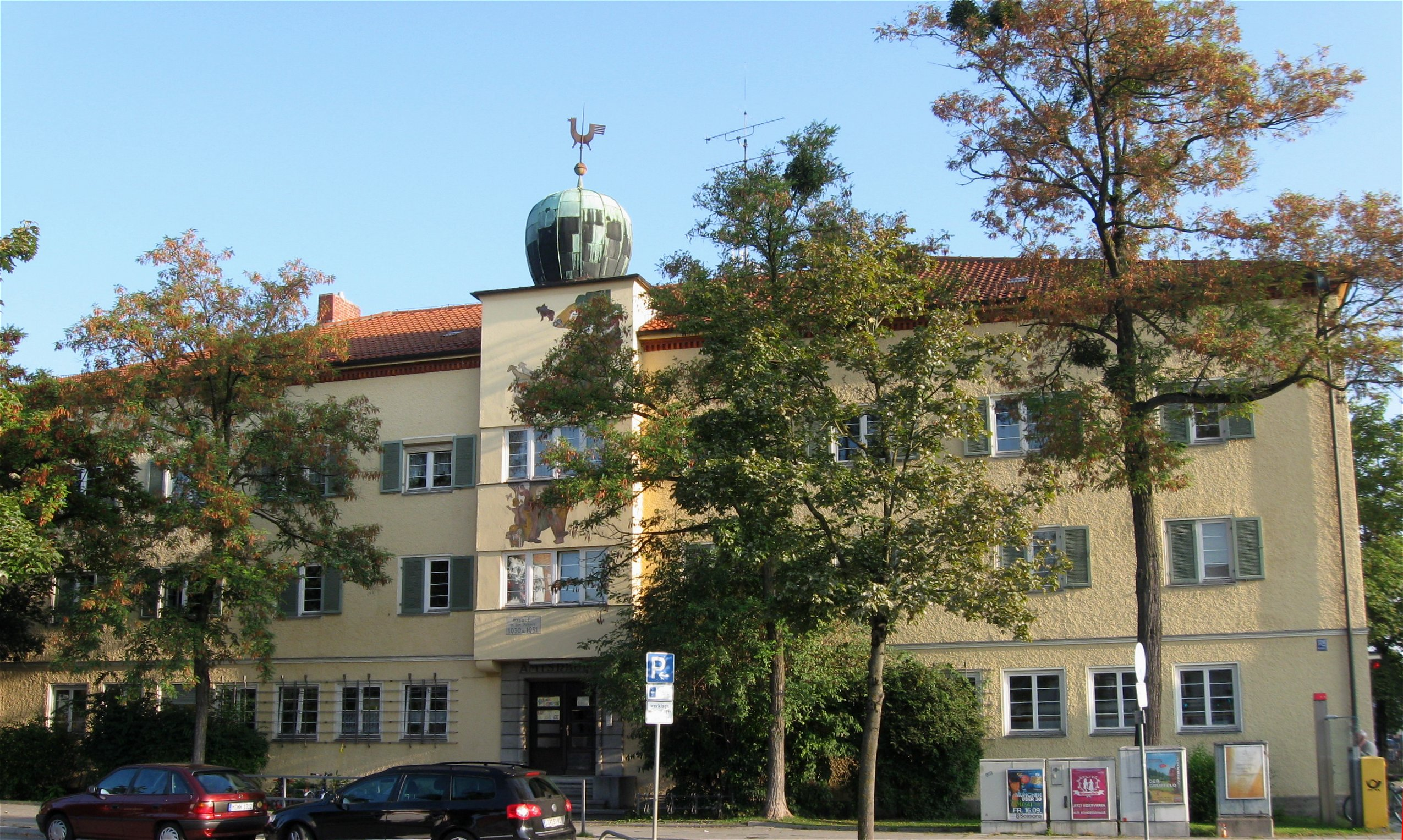
- The main frontage of the town hall in September 2011

General information
- Type: Town hall
- Architectural style: Modern style
- Location: Großhadern, Germany
- Coordinates: 48.1157°N 11.4788°E
- Completed: 1931

Design and construction
- Architect: Ludwig Zwingmann

Großhadern Town Hall (German: Rathaus Großhadern) is the former town hall of the municipality of Großhadern, Bavaria, Germany, which was incorporated into Munich in 1938. It stands on the north side of Würmtalstraße. The building is listed as a protected monument in the Bavarian protected monuments list.

== History ==
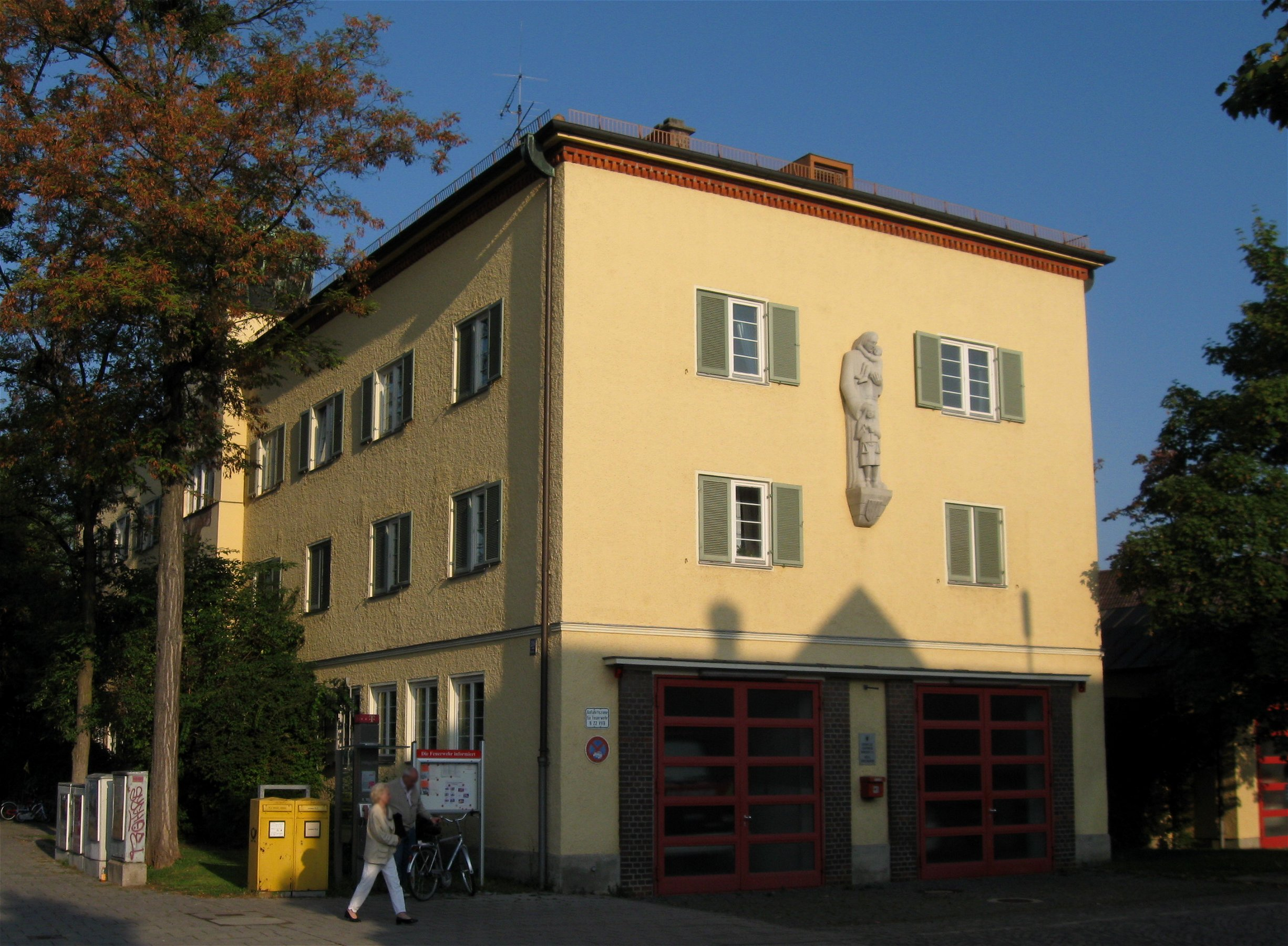
Großhadern Town Hall, narrow side on Großhaderner Straße

The village of Großhadern developed along Heiglhofstraße (formerly Dorfstraße) in the early 20th century. Key buildings were the Weißes Bräuhaus (White Brewhouse) and the Church of St. Peter. In this context local civic leaders decided to commission a town hall. The site they selected, on the corner of Würmtalstraße and Großhaderner Straße, was a farmsted known as the Bartenhof. The farmhouse and stables had burned down in 1909.

Construction of the building started in 1930. It was designed by Ludwig Zwingmann in the modern style, built in brick with a cement render finish and was completed in 1931. The method of construction was intended to combine practicality and traditional building. The building served multiple purposes from the beginning: the municipal offices of Großhadern and the local police occupied the ground floor, and on the upper floors were apartments. However, on 1 April 1938, the previously independent municipality of Großhadern was incorporated into the city of Munich.

After the police service vacated the building, a major programme of refurbishment works was completed in 1978 so allowing the fire service to take over the whole building. Then, in 1986, a single-storey garage was erected behind the main building so allowing the fire service to accommodate an additional fire engine.

The fire service relocated to a new fire station on an adjacent site in June 2026, leaving a local kindergarten as the sole occupier of the building.

== Description ==
The design involves a symmetrical main frontage of nine bays facing onto the street. The three-story building, which has a rectangular floor plan, is about 35 meters (115 ft) long and about 12 meters (39 ft) wide and has a hipped roof. The façade looks more like an apartment house than a town hall. The central bay features a square shaped doorway flanked by banded pilasters on the ground floor and an oriel window which spans the first and second floors. Above the oriel window, there is a mosaic, a spherical lantern and a weather vane. The ground floor on the side elevation is dominated by the two great gates of the fire station previously operated by the volunteer fire department of the Munich Fire Department. A stone figure was placed between the two rows of windows on the first floor.
