= Peter Gauweiler =

German politician (born 1949)

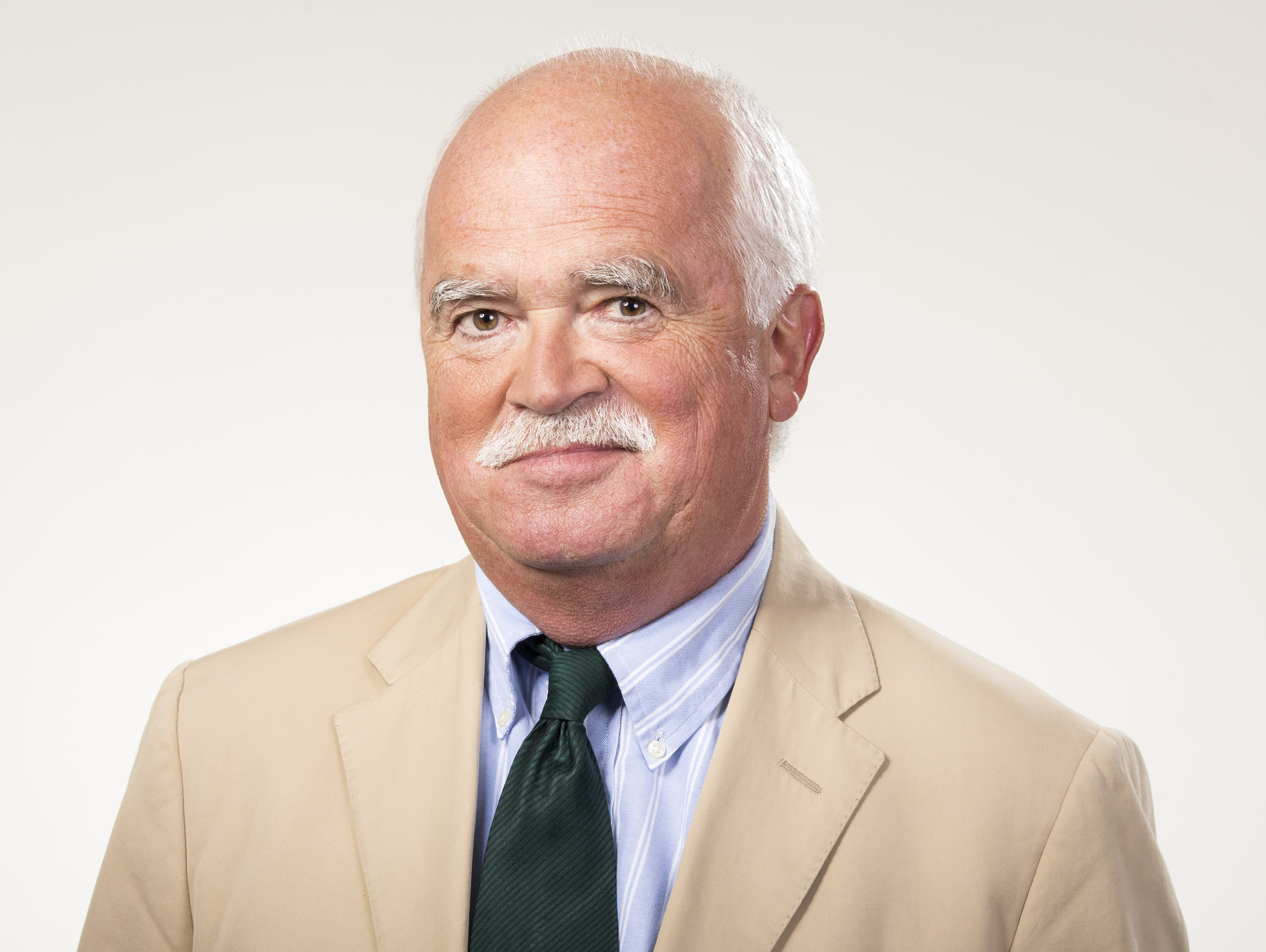
- Gauweiler in 2012

Member of the Bundestag; for Munich South
- In office 17 October 2002 – 31 March 2015
- Preceded by: Christoph Moosbauer
- Succeeded by: Iris Eberl

Minister for Regional Development and the Environment of Bavaria
- In office 30 October 1990 – 25 February 1994
- Minister-President: Max Streibl; Edmund Stoiber
- Preceded by: Alfred Dick
- Succeeded by: Thomas Goppel

Member of the Landtag of Bavaria; for München-Fürstenried
- In office 24 October 1990 – 31 October 2002
- Preceded by: Gerhard Frank
- Succeeded by: Martin Fink

Personal details
- Born: 22 June 1949 (age 77) Munich, West Germany
- Party: Christian Social Union
- Spouse: Eva Gauweiler
- Children: 4
- Education: LMU Munich; Free University of Berlin
- Occupation: Politician
- Profession: Lawyer

Peter Gauweiler (born 22 June 1949) is a German lawyer and politician of Bavaria's Christian Social Union (CSU) who served as a member of the German Bundestag from 2002 to 2015, representing the Munich South district. From 2013 until 2015, he also served as deputy leader of the CSU, under the leadership of chairman Horst Seehofer. He resigned his parliamentary seat and leadership post in 2015 at age 65.

Gauweiler is considered a Euro-sceptic and made a name with partly successful constitutional complaints against the euro bailout fund and the Lisbon Treaty.

== Political career ==
=== Career in state politics ===
Gauweiler was born in Munich, Bavaria. He joined the CSU in 1968 and held an elected offices from 1972, first in the Munich City Council, and later in the Bavarian state parliament. In 1987, during Gauweiler’s time as secretary of state in the State Interior Ministry, Bavaria put into effect some of the stiffest AIDS regulations ordered anywhere in the world, including mandatory blood tests for prostitutes, drug addicts, prison inmates, applicants for civil-service jobs and some foreigners seeking residence in Bavaria.

From 1990 to 1994, Gauweiler served as Bavarian State Minister for Regional Development and Environment in the government of Minister-President Max Streibl. Most notably during that time, he demanded that the Party of Democratic Socialism and the German Communist Party be outlawed after German reunification.

=== Member of the German Parliament, 2002–2015 ===
Gauweiler first became a member of the German Bundestag in the 2002 elections.

From 2006, Gauweiler served as a member of the Committee on Foreign Affairs and the Chairman of the Sub-Committee on Foreign Cultural and Educational Policies of the German Bundestag. In 2009, he accompanied German foreign minister Frank-Walter Steinmeier on what was the first visit to Iraq by a German foreign minister in 22 years. Along with fellow lawmakers including Monika Grütters, Luc Jochimsen and Claudia Roth, Gauweiler traveled to Iran in 2010 to meet with Ali Larijani, Manouchehr Mottaki and others; the trip was heavily criticized by international human rights organizations. In 2012, he argued that the German government's gold reserves held in the United States should be repatriated.

Following the 2009 federal elections, Gauweiler was part of the CDU/CSU team in the negotiations with the FDP on a coalition agreement; he joined the working group on foreign affairs, defense and development policy, led by Franz Josef Jung and Werner Hoyer. Similarly, he participated in the negotiations on forming a so-called Grand Coalition with the SPD following the 2013 federal elections.

In November 2013, Gauweiler was elected deputy chairman of the CSU, in what was widely considered a move to appease the eurosceptic elements within his party. He resigned the post and his seat in the Bundestag on 31 March 2015, about three months before his 65th birthday; he had previously been strongly criticized by CSU leader Horst Seehofer for voting against the extension of financial aid for Greece. After his resignation he was immediately invited to become "a top official", by one report, in the euro-skeptic Alternative für Deutschland (AfD) party but he declined the invitation. The same report speculated that the resignation would cause Chancellor Angela Merkel more difficulty by removing a protector of her right political flank in the parliament.

=== Euroscepticism ===
Over many years, Gauweiler has led several attempts to have the German constitutional court block measures that he considers enhance the EU’s powers at the cost of national sovereignty. Although his legal cases have generally failed, he has gained support from conservative voters, including members of the eurosceptic AfD party.

In 1992, Gauweiler described the Maastricht Treaty as a "totalitarian dream", and called its key component, a common currency by 1999, as "Esperanto money". In 2008, he challenged the German ratification of the Treaty of Lisbon, claiming that the treaty was unconstitutional. He launched a similar challenge to the European Constitution in 2005, but the Federal Constitutional Court of Germany made no ruling and a presidential signature was never given. In 2008, he challenged the Treaty of Lisbon before the constitutional court, saying that the proposed reforms of the EU would undermine the independence of the German Parliament and clash with the German Constitution.

Gauweiler has also been among the most aggressive challengers of the European Central Bank's efforts to rescue the Euro at the Constitutional Court. In 2011, together with a group of academics, he unsuccessfully asked the court to block the country’s participation in the bail-out packages for Greece and in the European Financial Stability Facility, the predecessor of the European Stability Mechanism. In 2012, Gauweiler filed a complaint against the ESM and included opposition to a banking license for the bailout fund. Gauweiler claimed that the ECB's bond-buying program threatened Germany with unlimited losses, arguing that it is an additional ground to reject use of German tax revenue for the rescue fund. He managed to convince a majority of justices on the court's second senate that the ECB's program to save the European common currency was contrary to European Union law. The judges subsequently referred the case onward to the European Court of Justice in Luxembourg, a first for the German court.

On 27 January 2015 Gauweiler voted against the Merkel government’s proposal for a four-month extension of Greece's bailout; in doing so, joining 29 dissenters from the CDU/CSU parliamentary group who expressed scepticism as to whether the Greek government under Prime Minister Alexis Tsipras could be trusted to deliver on its reform pledges.

=== Pro-Russia stance ===
Gauweiler showed an early understanding for Russia's territorial claims against Ukraine. In September 2014, Gauweiler referenced a letter from Aleksandr Solzhenitsyn to Boris Yeltsin in 1991, in which Solzhenitsyn referred to Novorossiya ("New Russia") and many other areas of Ukraine beyond the Dnieper River as historically never belonging to Ukraine.

During the annexation of Crimea by Russia in March 2014, Gauweiler criticized the behavior of the German government towards Russia. He described demands for economic sanctions and increased troop presence as "saber rattling" and "dangerous posturing." The United States and the European Union had brought Germany "into a dangerous escalation of threats." According to Gauweiler, the West had ignored and constantly frustrated Russia after the fall of the Iron Curtain.

In March 2014, Gauweiler stated on behalf of his party: "We are for partnership. We are for partnership with Kyiv, but Moscow belongs just as much to Europe and we will not allow European Russia to be excluded by Kyiv, by others. We are for cooperation with Russia." Gauweiler called for a return of German policy to the "wisdom" of Franz Josef Strauss and approvingly quoted his statement: "Whenever Germany and Russia had good relations, it was always good for Europe."

On September 12, 2014, Gauweiler traveled to Moscow to open the "Year of Language and Literature in Russia and Germany" as chairman of the Bundestag subcommittee on foreign cultural and educational policy. During his visit, he criticized the sanctions policy against Russia. He said that it was a cowardly policy that was going in the wrong direction. Experiences in Iran and Iraq had shown that such punitive measures did not work. It was necessary to build bridges and talk to each other. "Russia belongs to Europe! Sanctions are the wrong way."

In February 2023, Gauweiler was one of the initial signers of Manifest für Frieden, a petition calling for an end to military support to Ukraine in the wake of the 2022 Russian invasion of Ukraine.

== Legal practice ==
From 1996 to 2019, Gauweiler was a partner in the law firm Bub, Gauweiler & Partner in Munich. Among other high-profile cases, the firm represented Gauweiler’s friend and onetime media mogul Leo Kirch in a multibillion-dollar lawsuit against Deutsche Bank. Notable clients also included the Government of Qatar, Wirecard and M. M. Warburg & Co.

In 2021, Süddeutsche Zeitung revealed that Gauweiler had been receiving consultancy fees amounting to more than eleven million euros by eurosceptic billionaire August von Finck during his time in parliament.

== Other activities ==
- Goethe-Institut, Delegate to the General Meeting

== Publications ==
- mit Christian Ude: Briefwechsel. Prinzedition in Keyser Verlag, Berlin 2009, ISBN 978-3-86886-016-0.
- mit Christian Ude: Briefwechsel zwei. Prinzedition in Keyser Verlag, Berlin 2010, ISBN 978-3-86886-017-7.
- mit Christian Ude: Briefwechsel drei. Prinzedition in Keyser Verlag, Berlin 2011, ISBN 978-3-86886-020-7.
- mit Christian Ude: Briefwechsel vier. Prinzedition in Keyser Verlag, Berlin 2012, ISBN 978-3-86886-023-8.
- Bernhard von Gudden und die Entmündigung und Internierung König Ludwigs des Zweiten aus juristischer Sicht. In: Hanns Hippius und Reinhard Steinberg (Hrsg.): Bernhard von Gudden. Springer, Berlin 2007, S. 93-107, ISBN 978-3-540-39721-2.
