= Jerzy Montag =

German politician

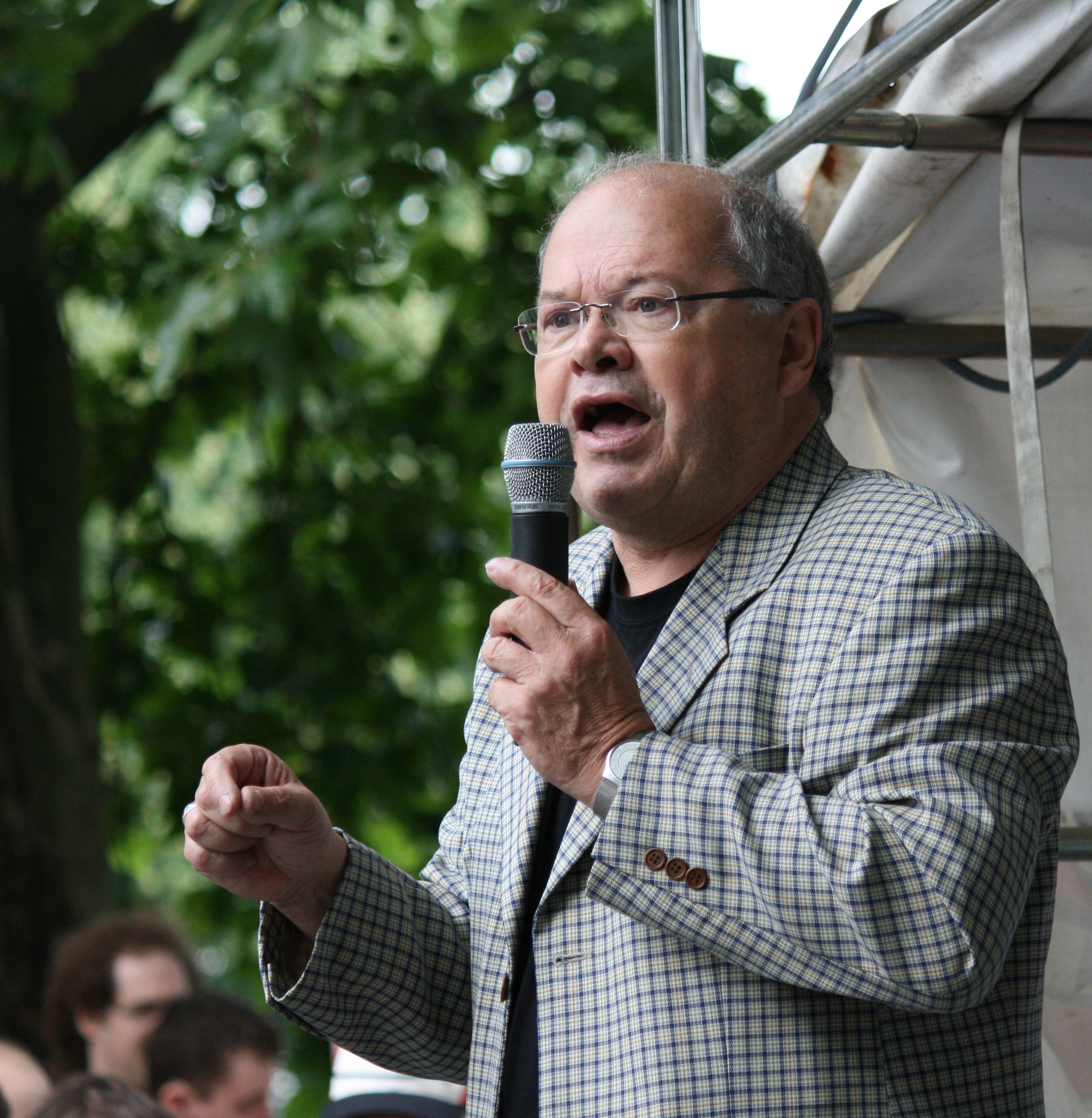
- Montag in 2009
- Born: 13 February 1947 (age 78); Katowice, Silesia, Poland
- Occupation: Politician

Jerzy Montag (born 13 February 1947) is a German politician. He is a member of the Green Party.

== Biography ==
After his Abitur in Mannheim in 1966 Montag studied sociology, political science and law in Heidelberg, Mannheim and Munich. Since he passed his second Bar examination (Staatsexamen) in 1975 Montag has worked as a freelancing lawyer. He is specialized in criminal law.

In 1984 Montag joined the Green Party. In the years 1998 to 2002 he was chairman of the party in the State of Bavaria. Since 2002 Montag has been a member of the Bundestag, elected from the Bavarian regional list, after unsuccessfully contesting the Munich South constituency, and speaker of the Green Party's parliamentary group on law politics. In 2005 he was spokesman of the Greens during the meetings of the Committee of inquiry on the German Visa Affair 2005.
