= LMU Klinikum =

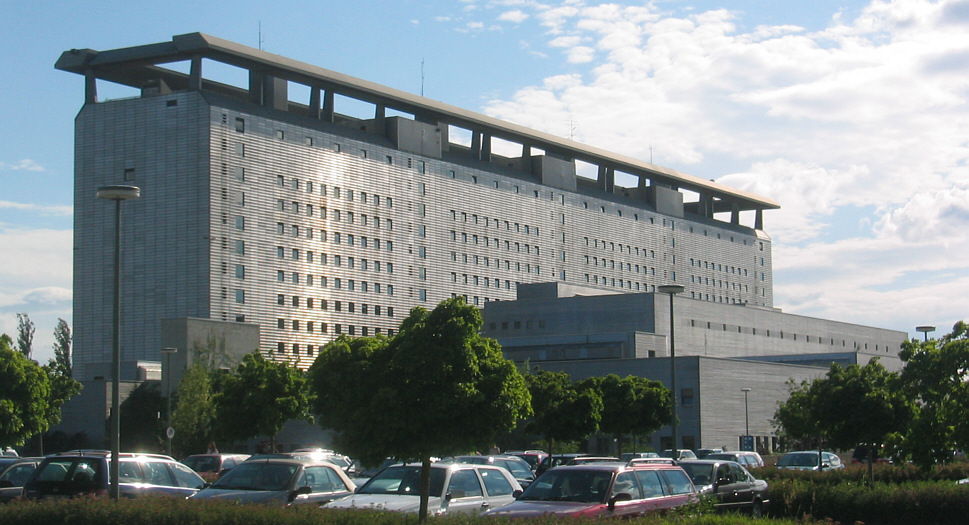
- LMU Klinikum – Campus Großhadern

Geography
- Location: Hadern, Munich, Bavaria, Germany
- Coordinates: 48.132478°N 11.561845°E

Organisation
- Affiliated university: LMU Munich

Links
- Other links: List of hospitals in Germany

The LMU Klinikum (until 2020 Klinikum der Universität München) is the hospital complex of LMU Munich in Germany. It includes the Campus Innenstadt in the city centre and the Campus Großhadern in Hadern.

The hospital has more than 2,000 beds and includes 48 clinics, institutes and departments, making it one of the largest hospitals in Europe.

In 2015, LMU Munich was ranked as Germany's leading university in the subject area "Clinical, pre-clinical and health" by the Times Higher Education World University Ranking.

== Campus Großhadern ==
The Campus Großhadern (formerly Klinikum Großhadern) of LMU Munich in the Großhadern district of Hadern is the largest hospital complex in Munich, owing to its affiliated institutions and 1,418 beds. In 1994 the new buildings of the Genzentrum (gene center) belonging to the LMU were put into operation and in 1999 the entire chemical/pharmaceutical faculty was relocated to the HighTech CampusLMU in Hadern. After the merger with the Klinikum Innenstadt, the exact definition of the complex is LMU Klinikum - Campus Großhadern.

The organ transplantation department of the clinic is one of the leading organ transplantation clinics in Germany. All clinically established forms of organ transplantation are implemented, e.g. Heart, Heart & Lung (simultaneously), Lungs (one or two) Pancreas, Kidney and Pancreas & Kidney simultaneously. Aside from patient care the clinic also plays an important role in clinical and theoretical research, and student education. Attached to the clinic is a school of nursing.

As well as accommodating vehicles used for the emergencies, the clinic is also a base for the "Christoph München" rescue helicopter.

== Campus Innenstadt ==
The Campus Innenstadt in downtown Munich has Departments of Allergology and Dermatology, Anaesthesiology, Child and Adolescent Psychiatry, Emergency Medicine, Gynaecology, Internal Medicine, Maxillofacial Surgery, Nuclear Medicine, Ophthalmology, Pediatrics and Pediatric Surgery (Dr. von Hauner Children's Hospital), Psychiatry and Psychotherapy, Radiology, Rehabilitative Medicine and Surgery. After the merger with the Klinikum Großhadern, the exact definition of the complex is LMU Klinikum - Campus Innenstadt.

== See also ==
- Klinikum Großhadern (Munich U-Bahn)
