= St. Canisius, Munich =

Former church in Munich, Germany

Coordinates: 48°06′48″N 11°28′53″E

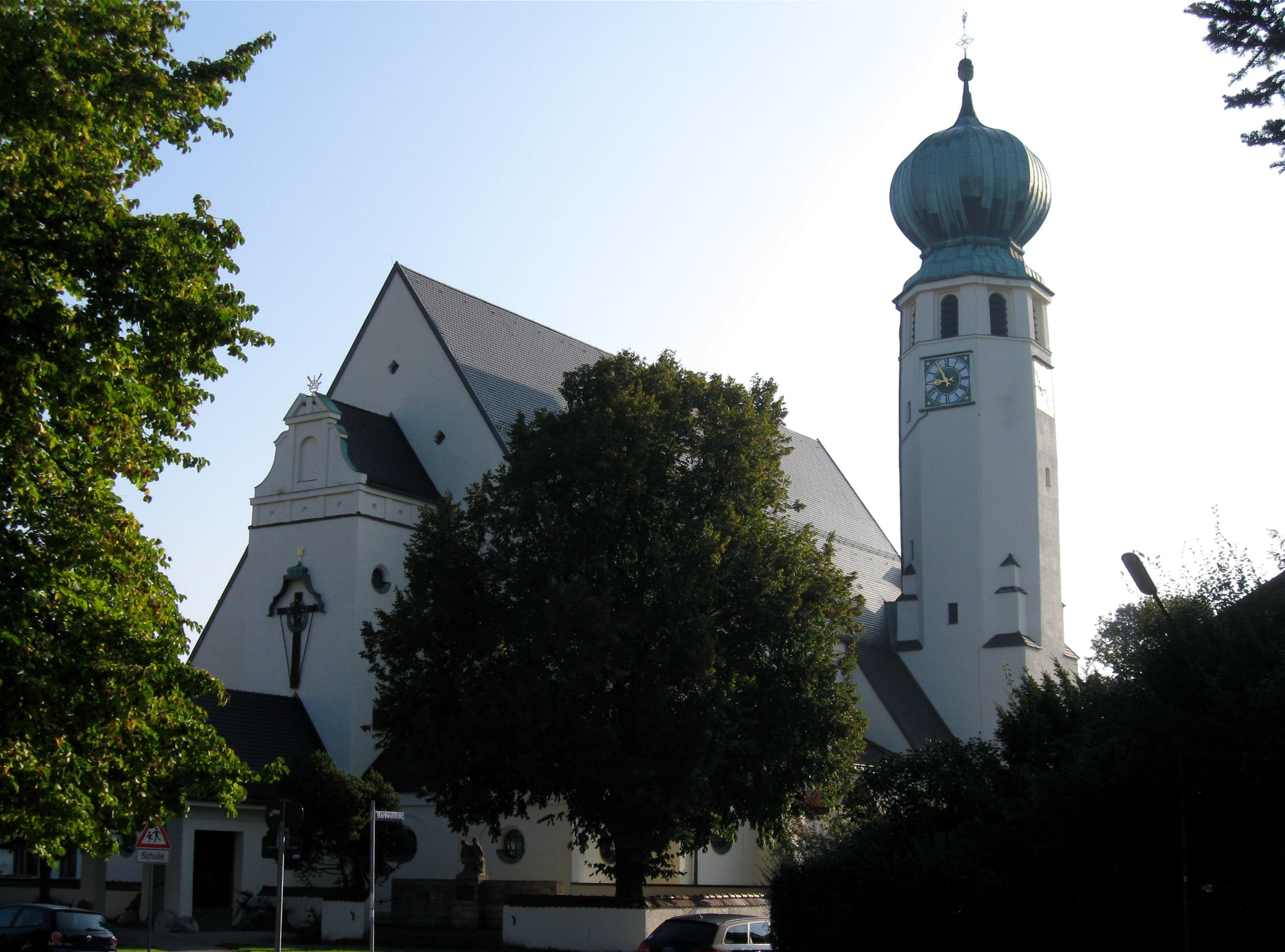
St. Canisius

St. Canisius is a former Roman Catholic church in the Hadern district of Munich, Germany. Designed by the Munich architect Franz Rank, the foundation stone was laid in 1925, and the church was consecrated on 29 August 1926 by Cardinal Faulhaber.
