= St. Peter, Großhadern =

Building in Großhadern, Germany

Coordinates: 48°06′50″N 11°28′43″E

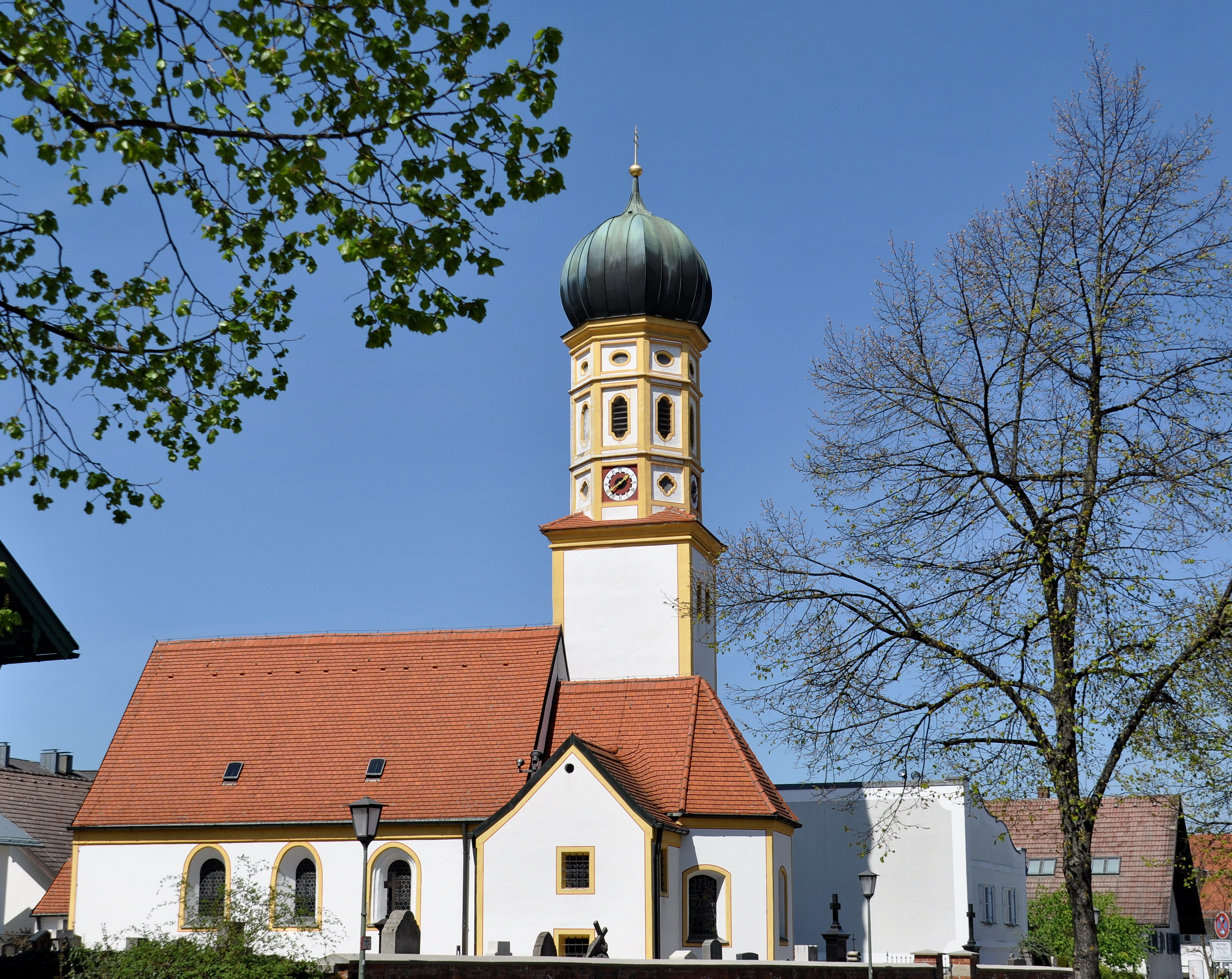
St. Peter, Großhadern

St. Peter is a Catholic church in Großhadern, which became part of Munich, Bavaria, Germany. It is part of the Diocese of Munich and Freising

== Notable people ==
- Johann Georg Seidenbusch (1641–1729) was baptized in St Peter's Church.
