= Dr. von Hauner Children's Hospital =

Hospital

Geography
- Location: Ludwigsvorstadt-Isarvorstadt, Munich, Bavaria, Germany
- Coordinates: 48°07′49″N 11°33′32″E

Organisation
- Type: Pediatric

Services
- Beds: 180

History
- Opened: 1846

Links
- Website: www.klinikum.uni-muenchen.de/Kinderchirurgische-Klinik-und-Poliklinik-im-Dr-von-Haunerschen-Kinderspital
- Lists: Hospitals in Germany

The Dr. von Hauner Children's Hospital or Dr. von Haunersches Kinderspital is the pediatric clinic and policlinic of the LMU Klinikum in Munich, Germany. It is located at the Campus Innenstadt (City Center).

The hospital combines general pediatric and pediatric surgery. The hospital has 180 beds in total, 119 pediatric beds with 61 additional beds for pediatric surgery. Both hospitals also offer multiple subspecialty services. They have a combined staff of over 500 people.

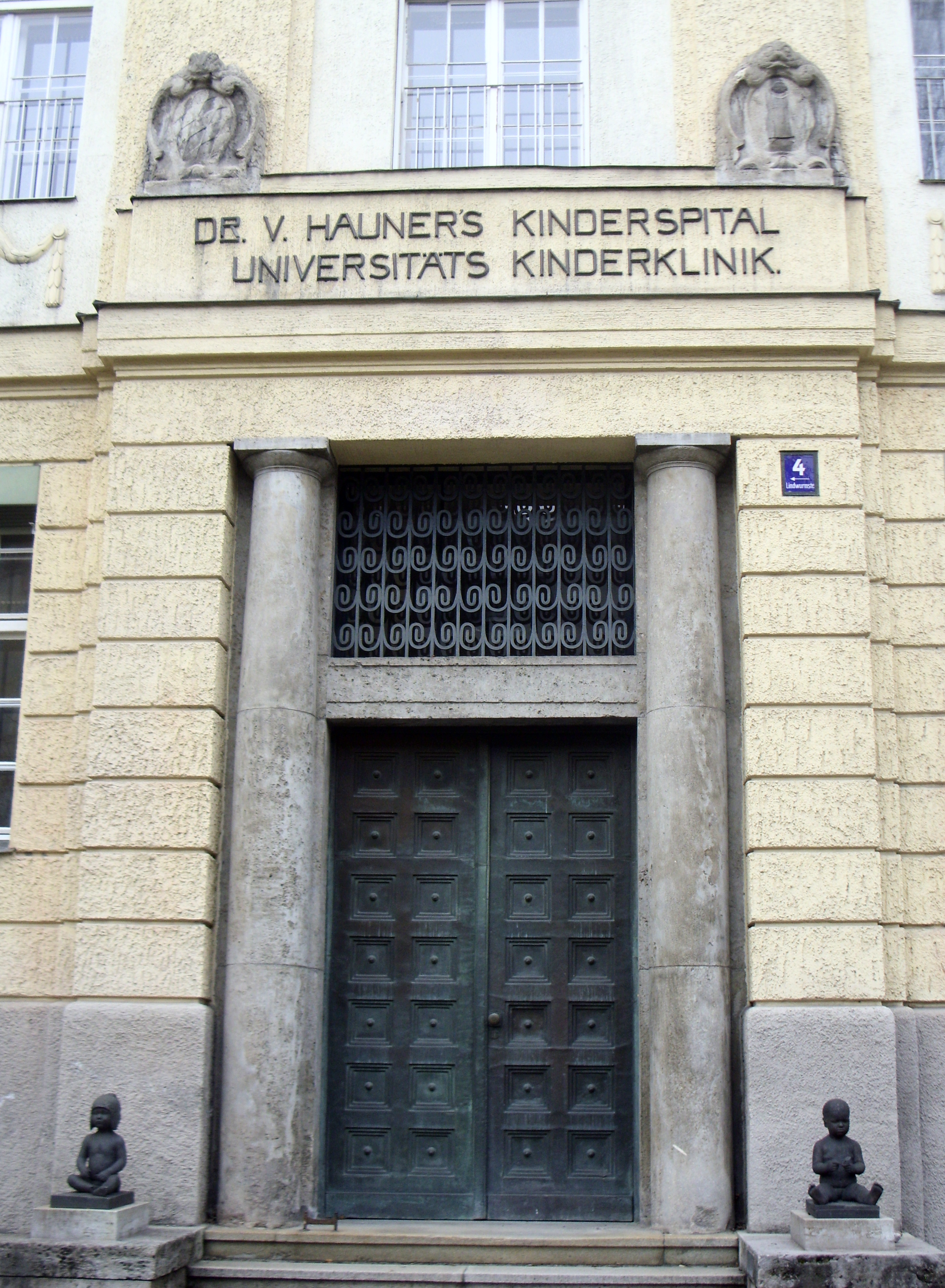

== History ==
The hospital has existed since 1998 in its current form, when the original hospital, founded by August Hauner in 1846 merged with the Kinderpoliklinik München (Children's Policlinic Munich).
