= Michael Kuffer =

German politician (born 1972)

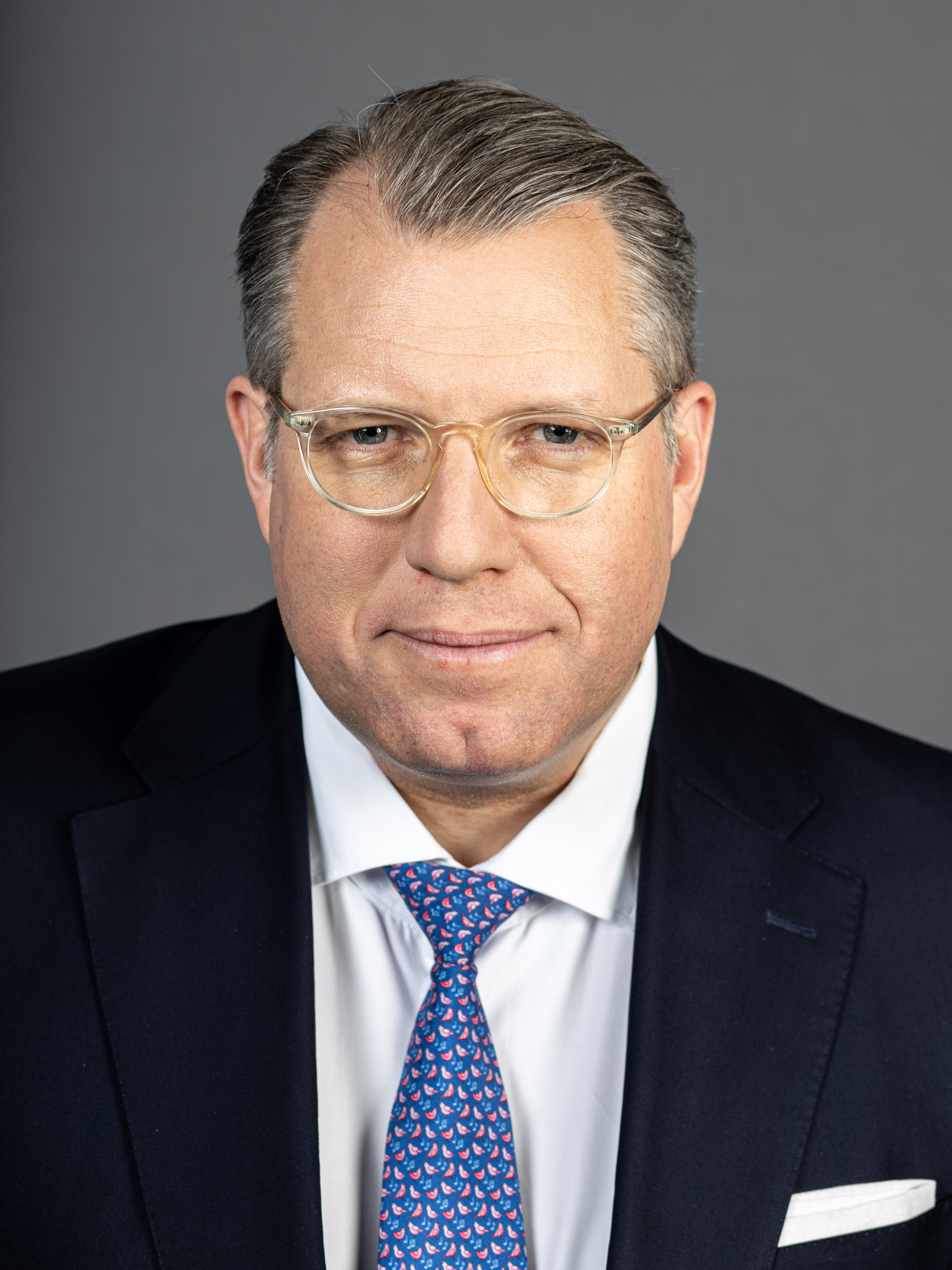
- Kufferin 2020

Member of the Bundestag; for Munich South
- In office 24 October 2017 – 26 October 2021
- Preceded by: Iris Eberl
- Succeeded by: Jamila Schäfer

Personal details
- Born: 16 March 1972 (age 54) Munich, West Germany
- Party: Christian Social Union
- Children: 4

Michael Kuffer (born 16 March 1972) is a German lawyer and politician of the Christian Social Union (CSU) who served as a member of the Bundestag from the state of Bavaria from 2017 to 2021.

== Political career ==
Kuffer became a member of the Bundestag in the 2017 German federal election, representing the Munich South constituency. He was a member of the Committee on Home Affairs and the Committee on the Environment, Nature Conservation and Nuclear Safety. In this capacity, he serves as his parliamentary group’s rapporteur on emergency management.

He narrowly lost his seat to the Greens at the 2021 German federal election.

== Other activities ==
- German Red Cross (DRK), Member
