= Wolfgang Wiehle =

German politician (born 1964)

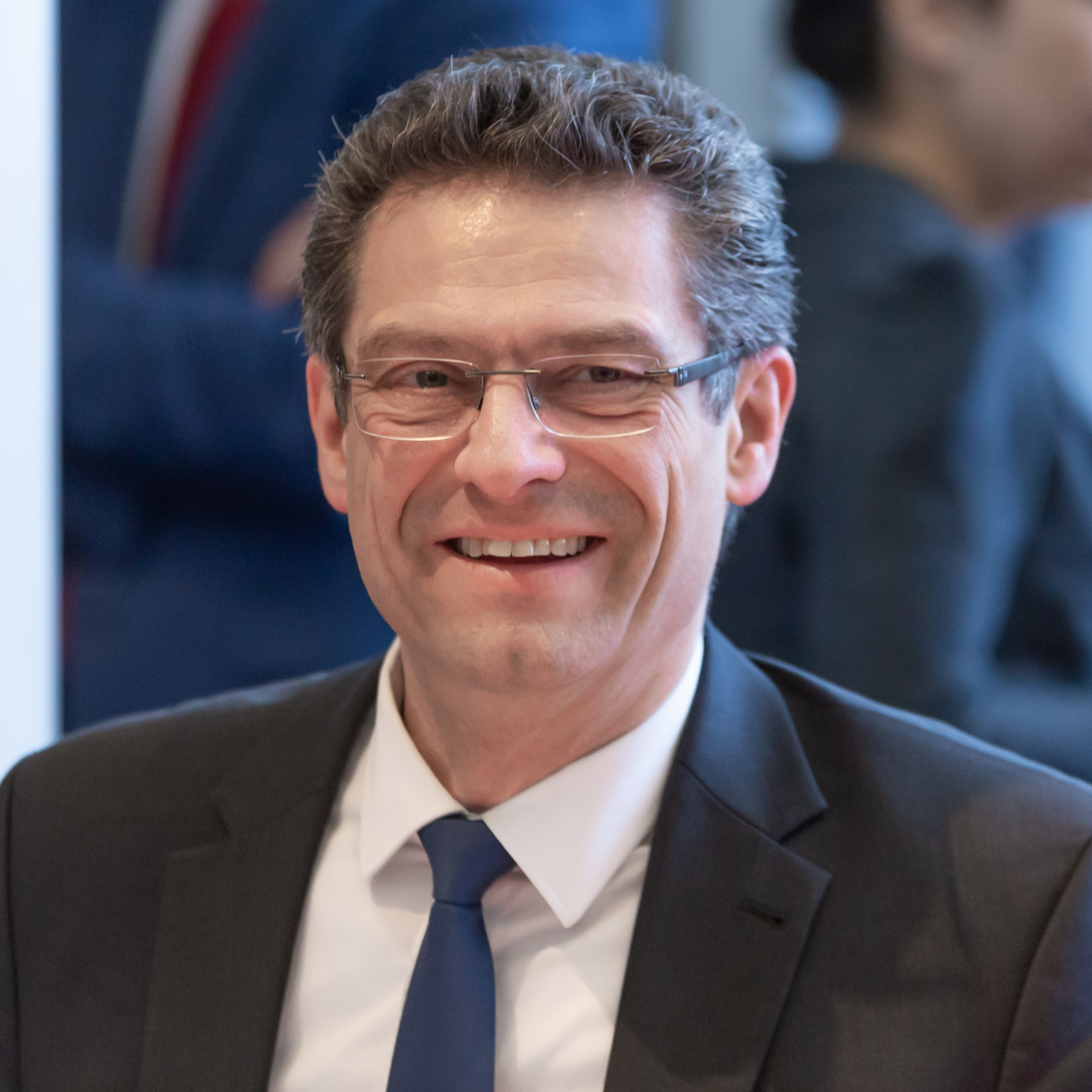
- Wolfgang Wiehle, 2020

Member of the Bundestag
- Incumbent
- Assumed office 24 October 2017

Personal details
- Born: 20 October 1964 (age 61)
- Party: AfD

Wolfgang Wiehle (born 20 October 1964) is a German politician for the Alternative for Germany (AfD) and a member of the Bundestag.

== Life and politics ==
Wiehle was born 1964 in the German city of Munich and studied from 1982 to 1990 at the Technical University of Munich. He is a qualified IT specialist. Wiehle is member of the populist right-wing AfD and after the 2017 German federal election, he became a member of the Bundestag. Wiehle denies the scientific consensus on climate change.
