= Postal, courier and parcel services in Germany =

The postal, courier, and parcel services in Germany deliver mail and parcels in that country. Multiple companies compete to provide such services. After the automotive industry and trade, the logistics sector is the country's third-largest commercial sector. The post-and-parcel service branch alone employed around 570,000 people in 2019.

== Development ==
Since 2002, the industry added 70,000 workers to cope with the rapidly growing online trade. The Covid pandemic further drove growth in online trade and parcel-delivery. German Post and DHL said in 2021 that world trade could recover from the economic slump caused by the pandemic.

== Investment plans ==
2022 research from University of Bamberg reported that planned investment focused almost exclusively on technology. "Rather, smartphones, tablets, handheld scanners, onboard computers as well as control and assistance systems are used to further simplify workflows, to transmit the specifications from the headquarters in a smaller-mesh manner, to offer multilingual translations of work instructions and to enforce more precise and tightly timed instructions for low-skilled and semi-skilled workers."

== Companies ==
- DHL
- DPD
- GLS
- Hermes Logistik
