= Hadern =

Borough of Munich, Germany

Coordinates: 48°06′38″N 11°27′55″E

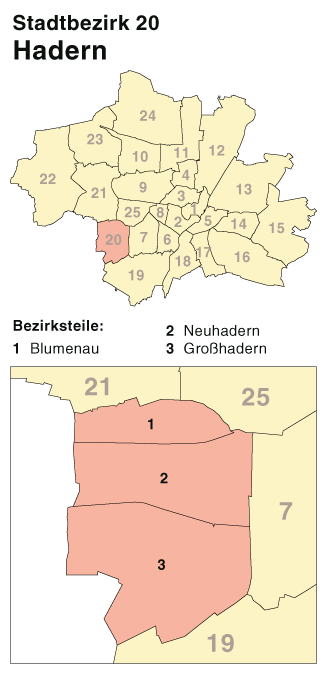
Borough 20 Hadern, Location in Munich

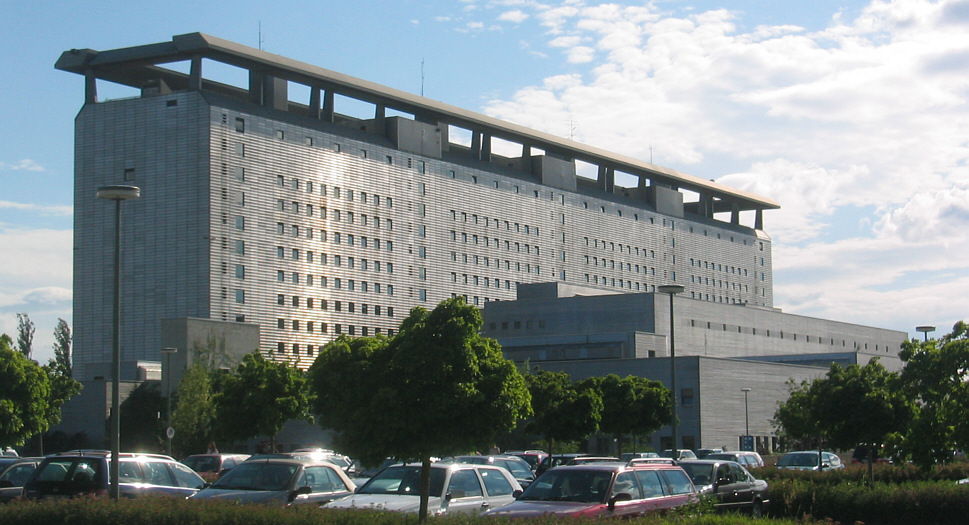
The Klinikum Großhadern

Hadern (German pronunciation: [ˈhaːdɐn]) is the 20th borough of the Bavarian city of Munich in Germany.

== Location ==
Located in the south-west of Munich, Hadern's borders are the Autobahn Munich-Garmish in the south, Fürstenriederstrasse in the east and Senftenauerstrasse in the north and also the south. A large part of the borough is occupied by the Waldfriedhof, the largest cemetery in the city.

== History and description ==
Hadern was originally a farmer village and was first mentioned in the 11th century by the name of Haderun. Großhadern belonged to the Benediktbeuern Abbey, Kleinhadern to the Schäftlarn Abbey. Großhadern was incorporated into Munich in 1938, thus making it the youngest district. The structures of the former rural settlement in Großhadern can still clearly be made out in the old village centre. Structurally, Hadern consists mainly of family homes. On areas previously used for agricultural purposes in the district, large living complexes like the Blumenau or the complexes on Senftenauerstrasse and in Neuhadern with a high proportion of council tenants were built after the Second World War until into the 80s.

New residential buildings are currently being built south of the Klinikum Großhadern. Since the extension of U-Bahn Line 6 to the clinic, the district is well connected in terms of public transport.

The Klinikum Großhadern (Großhadern Medical Centre) of LMU Munich is the largest hospital complex in Munich. In 1994 the Genzentrum (Gene Centre) of the LMU was put into operation and in 1999 the entire chemical/pharmaceutical faculty was relocated to Hadern. Further constructional development followed in 2004 with the inclusion of the lecture and research department in Department Biologie II of the Biozentrums der HighTech CampusLMU (Biology Centre of the HighTech CampusLMU). Over the mid and long term the entire biological faculty and further science faculties and institutes are to be consolidated together here.

The Kinderzentrum des Bezirks Oberbayern (Children's centre of Oberbayern) and the associated Montessorischule as well as the Augustinum elderly home in the area and its associated Stiftsklinik are further social facilities located in the district, that along with the clinical centre, constitute the majority of available jobs in the area.

The social order of the population consists of young people, workers as well as elderly people, above all in residential buildings and homes for one family. The proportion of foreigners in Hadern is under the city average.

== Statistics ==
(As of 31 December, inhabitants with principal residence.)

Year	Inhabitants.	of which Foreigners	Area ha.	Residents per ha.	Source
2000	41,689	7,526 (18.1%)	921.59	45	Statistisches Taschenbuch München 2001. pdf-Download
2001	41,858	7,614 (18.2%)	921.59	45	Statistisches Taschenbuch München 2002. pdf-Download
2002	42,563	8,051 (18.9%)	921.59	46	Statistisches Taschenbuch München 2003. pdf-Download
2003	42,823	8,364 (19.5%)	922.55	46	Statistisches Taschenbuch München 2004. pdf-Download
2004	43,396	8,683 (20.0%)	922.55	47	Statistisches Taschenbuch München 2005. pdf-Download
2005	43,981	9,024 (20.5%)	922.37	48	Statistisches Taschenbuch München 2006. pdf-Download

(Statistical Pocket Book of Munich)
