= Schwandorf (electoral district) =

Federal electoral district of Germany

233 Schwandorf
- Electoral district for the Bundestag
- Schwandorf in 2025
- State: Bavaria
- Population: 282,800 (2019)
- Electorate: 222,424 (2021)
- Major settlements: Schwandorf; Cham; Burglengenfeld
- Area: 3,067.9 km^{2}

Current electoral district
- Created: 1949
- Party: CSU
- Member: Martina Englhardt-Kopf
- Elected: 2021, 2025

Schwandorf is an electoral constituency (German: Wahlkreis) represented in the Bundestag. It elects one member via first-past-the-post voting. Under the current constituency numbering system, it is designated as constituency 233. It is located in eastern Bavaria, comprising the districts of Cham and Schwandorf.

Schwandorf was created for the inaugural 1949 federal election. Since 2021, it has been represented by Martina Englhardt-Kopf of the Christian Social Union (CSU).

== Geography ==
Schwandorf is located in eastern Bavaria. As of the 2021 federal election, it comprises the districts of Cham and Schwandorf as well as the Verwaltungsgemeinschaft of Wörth a.d.Donau from the Landkreis Regensburg district.

== History ==
Schwandorf was created in 1949, then known as Burglengenfeld. It acquired its current name in the 1976 election. In the 1949 election, it was Bavaria constituency 20 in the numbering system. In the 1953 through 1961 elections, it was number 215. In the 1965 through 1972 elections, it was number 219. In the 1976 through 1998 elections, it was number 220. In the 2002 and 2005 elections, it was number 235. In the 2009 through 2021 elections, it was number 234. From the 2025 election, it has been number 233.

Originally, the constituency comprised the independent city of Schwandorf and the districts of Burglengenfeld, Roding, Beilngries, Parsberg, and Riedenburg. In the 1965 through 1972 elections, it comprised the city of Schwandorf and the districts of Cham, Burglengenfeld, Nabburg, Oberviechtach, Roding, Waldmünchen, Vohenstrauß, and Neunburg vorm Wald. In the 1976 through 2017 elections, it comprised the districts of Schwandorf and Cham. It acquired its current borders in the 2021 election.

Election	No.	Name	Borders
1949	20	Burglengenfeld	Schwandorf city; Burglengenfeld district; Roding district; Beilngries district; Parsberg district; Riedenburg district
1953	215	Burglengenfeld	Schwandorf city; Burglengenfeld district; Roding district; Beilngries district; Parsberg district; Riedenburg district
1957	215	Burglengenfeld	Schwandorf city; Burglengenfeld district; Roding district; Beilngries district; Parsberg district; Riedenburg district
1961	215	Burglengenfeld	Schwandorf city; Burglengenfeld district; Roding district; Beilngries district; Parsberg district; Riedenburg district
1965	219	Burglengenfeld	Schwandorf city; Cham district; Burglengenfeld district; Nabburg district; Oberviechtach district; Roding district; Waldmünchen district; Vohenstrauß district; Neunburg vorm Wald district
1969	219	Burglengenfeld	Schwandorf city; Cham district; Burglengenfeld district; Nabburg district; Oberviechtach district; Roding district; Waldmünchen district; Vohenstrauß district; Neunburg vorm Wald district
1972	219	Burglengenfeld	Schwandorf city; Cham district; Burglengenfeld district; Nabburg district; Oberviechtach district; Roding district; Waldmünchen district; Vohenstrauß district; Neunburg vorm Wald district
1976	220	Schwandorf	Cham district; Schwandorf district
1980	220	Schwandorf	Cham district; Schwandorf district
1983	220	Schwandorf	Cham district; Schwandorf district
1987	220	Schwandorf	Cham district; Schwandorf district
1990	220	Schwandorf	Cham district; Schwandorf district
1994	220	Schwandorf	Cham district; Schwandorf district
1998	220	Schwandorf	Cham district; Schwandorf district
2002	235	Schwandorf	Cham district; Schwandorf district
2005	235	Schwandorf	Cham district; Schwandorf district
2009	234	Schwandorf	Cham district; Schwandorf district
2013	234	Schwandorf	Cham district; Schwandorf district
2017	234	Schwandorf	Cham district; Schwandorf district
2021	234	Schwandorf	Cham district; Schwandorf district; Landkreis Regensburg district (only Wörth a.d.Donau Verwaltungsgemeinschaft)
2025	233	Schwandorf	Cham district; Schwandorf district; Landkreis Regensburg district (only Wörth a.d.Donau Verwaltungsgemeinschaft)

== Members ==
The constituency has been held continuously by the Christian Social Union (CSU) since its creation. It was first represented by Karl Kahn from 1949 to 1957, followed by Hans Drachsler from 1957 to 1965. Alois Niederalt served one term from 1965 to 1969. Dionys Jobst was then representative from 1969 to 1998, a total of eight consecutive terms. Klaus Hofbauer served from 1998 to 2009. Karl Holmeier was elected in 2009 and re-elected in 2013 and 2017. He was succeeded by Martina Englhardt-Kopf in 2021.

Election	Member	Party	%
1949	Karl Kahn	CSU	37.0
1953	Karl Kahn	CSU	60.4
1957	Hans Drachsler	CSU	66.4
1961	Hans Drachsler	CSU	67.2
1965	Alois Niederalt	CSU	68.4
1969	Dionys Jobst	CSU	65.1
1972	Dionys Jobst	CSU	64.7
1976	Dionys Jobst	CSU	66.5
1980	Dionys Jobst	CSU	65.6
1983	Dionys Jobst	CSU	65.3
1987	Dionys Jobst	CSU	55.9
1990	Dionys Jobst	CSU	58.9
1994	Dionys Jobst	CSU	54.5
1998	Klaus Hofbauer	CSU	53.8
2002	Klaus Hofbauer	CSU	66.9
2005	Klaus Hofbauer	CSU	58.1
2009	Karl Holmeier	CSU	51.3
2013	Karl Holmeier	CSU	57.7
2017	Karl Holmeier	CSU	48.5
2021	Martina Englhardt-Kopf	CSU	35.1
2025	Martina Englhardt-Kopf	CSU	42.2

== Election results ==
=== 2025 election ===
Federal election (2025): Schwandorf
Notes:	Blue background denotes the winner of the electorate vote. Pink background denotes a candidate elected from their party list. Yellow background denotes an electorate win by a list member, or other incumbent. A ✓ or ✗ denotes status of any incumbent, win or lose respectively.						
Party	Candidate	Votes	%	±%	Party votes	%	±%
CSU	✓ Martina Englhardt-Kopf	77,716	42.2	▲7.1	72,443	39.3	▲5.1
AfD	Reinhard Wilhelm Mixl	49,700	27.0	▲13.7	51,974	28.2	▲14.7
SPD	Marianne Schieder	25,536	13.9	▼8.9	17,112	9.3	▼8.6
FW	Fabian Georg Schmid	13,593	7.4	▼8.4	14,477	7.8	▼6.6
Greens	Tina Winklmann	7,512	4.1	▼0.5	9,172	5.0	▼1.4
Left	Tobias Mainka	4,913	2.7	▲0.9	6,052	3.3	▲1.3
FDP	Ileana-Valeria Pößl	3,426	1.9	▼2.4	4,927	2.7	▼4.6
BSW					4,543	2.5	
APT					1,061	0.6	▼0.3
ÖDP	Bianca Heistrüvers	1,233	0.7	▼0.3	681	0.4	▼0.2
dieBasis					509	0.3	▼0.6
Volt					483	0.3	▼0.2
PARTEI					423	0.2	▼0.2
BP					336	0.2	▼0.3
BD	Armin Arnold Bachl	520	0.3		206	0.1	
Humanists					79	0.0	Steady
MLPD					29	0.0	Steady
Informal votes		915			557		
Total valid votes		184,149			184,507		
Turnout		185,064	83.8	▲5.1			
CSU hold	Majority	28,016	15.2	▲2.9			

=== 2021 election ===
Federal election (2021): Schwandorf
Notes:	Blue background denotes the winner of the electorate vote. Pink background denotes a candidate elected from their party list. Yellow background denotes an electorate win by a list member, or other incumbent. A ✓ or ✗ denotes status of any incumbent, win or lose respectively.						
Party	Candidate	Votes	%	±%	Party votes	%	±%
CSU	Martina Englhardt-Kopf	60,924	35.1	▼13.2	59,430	34.1	▼7.3
SPD	Marianne Schieder	39,615	22.8	▼1.1	31,209	17.9	▲1.8
FW	Christian Schindler	27,381	15.8	▲6.0	25,114	14.4	▲9.2
AfD	Wolfgang Pöschl	23,142	13.3	▼13.0	23,508	13.5	▼3.9
Greens	Tina Winklmann	7,934	4.6	▲0.7	11,179	6.4	▲1.9
FDP	Ines Tegtmeier	7,341	4.2	▼0.5	12,650	7.3	▲0.7
Left	Manfred Preischl	3,043	1.8	▼3.2	3,394	1.9	▼2.6
dieBasis	Andreas Duschinger	1,846	1.1		1,538	0.9	
Tierschutzpartei					1,494	0.9	▲0.1
ÖDP	Sönke Siebold	1,747	1.0	▼1.3	1,034	0.6	▼0.3
BP					877	0.5	▼0.5
PARTEI					782	0.4	▲0.1
Pirates					368	0.2	▼0.1
Unabhängige					253	0.1	
Volt					181	0.1	
Gesundheitsforschung					174	0.1	0.0
V-Partei3	Constanze Beck	515	0.3		165	0.1	0.0
Team Todenhöfer					161	0.1	
NPD					161	0.1	▼0.3
The III. Path					101	0.1	
Humanists					98	0.1	
Bündnis C					91	0.1	
LKR	Thomas Faltermeier	267	0.2		83	0.0	
du.					77	0.0	
DKP					13	0.0	0.0
MLPD					10	0.0	0.0
Informal votes		1,202			812		
Total valid votes		173,755			174,145		
Turnout		174,957	78.7	▲3.5			
CSU hold	Majority	21,309	12.3	▼12.0			

=== 2017 election ===
Federal election (2017): Schwandorf
Notes:	Blue background denotes the winner of the electorate vote. Pink background denotes a candidate elected from their party list. Yellow background denotes an electorate win by a list member, or other incumbent. A ✓ or ✗ denotes status of any incumbent, win or lose respectively.						
Party	Candidate	Votes	%	±%	Party votes	%	±%
CSU	✓ Karl Holmeier	77,092	48.5	▼9.2	66,827	41.4	▼13.3
AfD					28,006	17.4	▲10.1
SPD	Marianne Schieder	38,461	24.2	▼0.6	26,122	16.2	▼3.2
FW	Frank Aumeier	15,496	9.7	▲5.1	8,278	5.1	▲0.2
Left	Marius J. Brey	7,929	5.0	▲2.3	7,339	4.6	▲1.3
FDP	Ines Tegtmeier	7,392	4.6	▲2.9	10,608	6.6	▲3.2
Greens	Tina Winklmann	6,172	3.9	▲0.7	7,302	4.5	▲0.3
ÖDP	Stefan Scheingraber	3,624	2.3	▲0.7	1,388	0.9	▼0.2
Independent	Ewald Ehrl	2,920	1.8				
BP					1,592	1.0	▼0.5
Tierschutzpartei					1,280	0.8	▲0.1
NPD					646	0.4	▼0.8
PARTEI					594	0.4	
Pirates					444	0.3	▼1.3
Gesundheitsforschung					195	0.1	
V-Partei³					191	0.1	
DM					162	0.1	
DiB					141	0.1	
BGE					104	0.1	
MLPD					31	0.0	0.0
DKP					16	0.0	
BüSo					15	0.0	0.0
Informal votes		3,463			1,268		
Total valid votes		159,086			161,281		
Turnout		162,549	75.1	▲9.8			
CSU hold	Majority	38,631	24.3	▼8.6			

=== 2013 election ===
Federal election (2013): Schwandorf
Notes:	Blue background denotes the winner of the electorate vote. Pink background denotes a candidate elected from their party list. Yellow background denotes an electorate win by a list member, or other incumbent. A ✓ or ✗ denotes status of any incumbent, win or lose respectively.						
Party	Candidate	Votes	%	±%	Party votes	%	±%
CSU	✓ Karl Holmeier	80,840	57.7	▲6.4	76,453	54.7	▲7.5
SPD	Marianne Schieder	34,716	24.8	▲0.6	27,066	19.4	▲1.9
FW	Jürgen Neuber	6,524	4.7		6,858	4.9	
Greens	Reinhold Schmalzbauer	4,516	3.2	▼1.3	5,927	4.2	▼1.8
Left	Georg Kaschner	3,820	2.7	▼3.9	4,505	3.2	▼4.7
BP		2,964	2.1		2,120	1.5	▲0.6
FDP	Alfred Johann Stuiber	2,430	1.7	▼6.1	4,701	3.4	▼8.3
AfD					4,575	3.3	
Pirates					2,153	1.5	▼0.1
NPD	Harald Merl	2,155	1.5	▼0.9	1,705	1.2	▼0.9
ÖDP	Wolfgang Meischner	2,152	1.5	▼0.5	1,527	1.1	▼0.5
Tierschutzpartei					1,020	0.7	0.0
REP					469	0.3	▼0.5
DIE FRAUEN					253	0.2	
Party of Reason					159	0.1	
PRO					105	0.1	
DIE VIOLETTEN					103	0.1	▼0.1
RRP					42	0.0	▼0.5
MLPD					38	0.0	0.0
BüSo					21	0.0	▼0.1
Informal votes		1,247			1,564		
Total valid votes		140,117			139,800		
Turnout		141,364	65.3	▼1.3			
CSU hold	Majority	46,124	32.9	▲5.8			

=== 2009 election ===
Federal election (2009): Schwandorf
Notes:	Blue background denotes the winner of the electorate vote. Pink background denotes a candidate elected from their party list. Yellow background denotes an electorate win by a list member, or other incumbent. A ✓ or ✗ denotes status of any incumbent, win or lose respectively.						
Party	Candidate	Votes	%	±%	Party votes	%	±%
CSU	Karl Holmeier	72,791	51.3	▼6.8	72,120	42.5	▼5.8
SPD	Marianne Schieder	34,321	24.2	▼3.9	24,828	17.5	▼8.8
FDP	Erich Bauer	11,058	7.8	▲4.8	16,553	11.7	▲4.7
Left	Peter Klaus Brüsemeister	9,396	6.6	▲3.3	11,310	8.0	▲4.2
Greens	Stefan Christoph	6,423	4.5	▲1.4	8,580	6.0	▲2.2
NPD	Ewald Ehrl	3,463	2.4	▼0.5	3,020	2.1	▼0.2
ÖDP		2,830	2.0		2,305	1.6	
Pirates					2,269	1.6	
BP					1,288	0.9	▲0.1
FAMILIE					1,225	0.9	0.0
REP					1,185	0.8	▼0.2
Tierschutzpartei					966	0.7	
Independent	Alois Späth	950	0.7				
RRP					761	0.5	
Independent	Reinhold Kiehl	556	0.4				
CM					226	0.2	
DIE VIOLETTEN					191	0.1	
PBC					159	0.1	0.0
DVU					94	0.1	
BüSo					49	0.0	0.0
MLPD					22	0.0	0.0
Informal votes		2,151			1,957		
Total valid votes		141,788			141,982		
Turnout		143,939	66.6	▼7.9			
CSU hold	Majority	38,470	27.1	▼2.9			

=== 2005 election ===
Federal election (2005):Schwandorf
Notes:	Blue background denotes the winner of the electorate vote. Pink background denotes a candidate elected from their party list. Yellow background denotes an electorate win by a list member, or other incumbent. A ✓ or ✗ denotes status of any incumbent, win or lose respectively.						
Party	Candidate	Votes	%	±%	Party votes	%	±%
CSU	✓ Klaus Hofbauer	91,714	58.1	▼8.8	84,368	53.4	▼14.0
SPD	Marianne Schieder	44,381	28.1	▲1.3	41,539	26.3	▲2.0
Left	Siegfried Stoiber	5,300	3.4		5,937	3.8	▲3.4
Greens	Dietmar Zierer	4,860	3.1	▲0.5	6,045	3.8	▲0.5
FDP	Albert Neuner	4,773	3.0	▲0.9	11,024	7.0	▲4.5
NPD	Erich Schwarzfischer	4,600	2.9		3,752	2.4	▲2.1
REP					1,623	1.0	▲0.5
Familie					1,320	0.8	
BP					1,218	0.8	▲0.6
Independent	Reinhold Kiehl	1,207	0.8				
Independent	Regina Ehrl	896	0.6				
Feminist					49116	0.3	▲0.2
GRAUEN					364	0.2	▲0.2
PBC					247	0.2	▲0.1
BüSo					88	0.1	0.0
MLPD					64	0.0	
Informal votes		2,785			2,511		
Total valid votes		157,731			158,005		
Turnout		160,516	74.5	▼5.8			
CSU hold	Majority	47,333	30				
