= Schieder =

Schieder is a German surname which may refer to:

- Andreas Schieder (born 1969), Austrian politician
- Illo Schieder, German musician and Eurovision contestant
- Marianne Schieder (born 1962), German politician
- Stefaan Schieder, German film producer
- Schieder-Schwalenberg, a town in North Rhine-Westphalia, Germany
