= Josephine Ortleb =

German politician

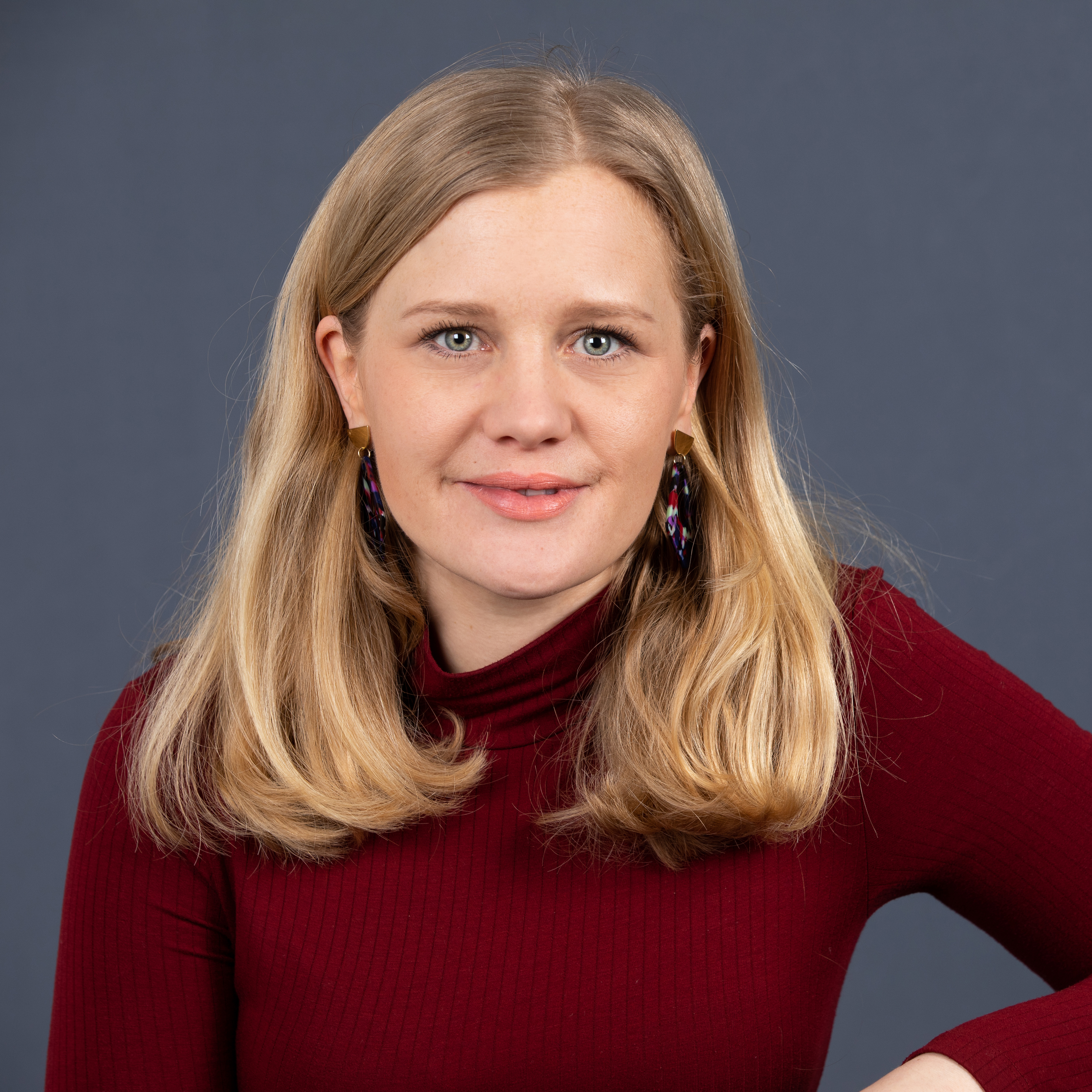
- Ortleb in 2020

Vice President of the Bundestag (on proposal of the SPD-faction)
- Incumbent
- Assumed office 25 March 2025
- President: Julia Klöckner
- Preceded by: Aydan Özoğuz

Whip of the Social Democratic Party in the Bundestag
- Incumbent
- Assumed office 16 December 2020 Serving with Gabriele Katzmarek, Marianne Schieder, Johannes Fechner
- Leader: Rolf Mützenich
- Chief Whip: Carsten Schneider; Katja Mast
- Preceded by: Dagmar Ziegler

Member of the Bundestag for Saarbrücken
- Incumbent
- Assumed office 24 October 2017
- Preceded by: Anette Hübinger

Personal details
- Born: 25 November 1986 (age 39) Saarbrücken, West Germany (now Germany)
- Party: SPD

Josephine Ortleb (born 25 November 1986) is a German politician of the Social Democratic Party (SPD) who has been serving as a member of the Bundestag from the state of Saarland since 2017. She has been its Vice President as of March 2025.

== Political career ==
Ortleb became a member of the Bundestag in the 2017 German federal election, representing Saarbrücken. In parliament, she is a member of the Committee on Families, Senior Citizens, Women and Youth and the Committee on Human Rights and Humanitarian Aid. In this capacity, she serves as her parliamentary group’s rapporteur on gender equality.

In addition to her committee assignments, Ortleb has been a substitute member of the German delegation to the Parliamentary Assembly of the Council of Europe (PACE) since 2018, where she serves on the Committee on Equality and Non-Discrimination (since 2018) and the Sub-Committee on the Rights of Minorities (since 2020).

Since 2020, Ortleb has been part of the SPD parliamentary group’s leadership under its chairman Rolf Mützenich. Within the group, she belongs to the Parliamentary Left, a left-wing movement.

== Other activities ==
- German Foundation for World Population (DSW), Member of the Parliamentary Advisory Board (2020–2021)
- Food, Beverages and Catering Union (NGG), Member
