= Ortleb =

Ortleb is a surname. Notable people with the surname include:

- Josephine Ortleb (born 1986), German politician
- Rainer Ortleb (born 1944), German academic and politician
