= Saarbrücken (electoral district) =

Electoral constituency of Germany

296 Saarbrücken
- Electoral district for the Bundestag
- Saarbrücken in 2025
- State: Saarland
- Population: 271,400 (2019)
- Electorate: 192,929 (2021)
- Major settlements: Saarbrücken; Völklingen; Püttlingen
- Area: 325.7 km^{2}

Current electoral district
- Created: 1957
- Party: SPD
- Member: Josephine Ortleb
- Elected: 2017, 2021, 2025

Saarbrücken is an electoral constituency (German: Wahlkreis) represented in the Bundestag. It elects one member via first-past-the-post voting. Under the current constituency numbering system, it is designated as constituency 296. It is located in southern Saarland, comprising most of the district of Regionalverbrand Saarbrücken district.

Saarbrücken was created for the inaugural 1957 federal election after the accession of Saarland to Germany. Since 2017, it has been represented by Josephine Ortleb of the Social Democratic Party (SPD).

== Geography ==
Saarbrücken is located in southern Saarland. As of the 2021 federal election, it comprises the municipalities of Großrosseln, Kleinblittersdorf, Püttlingen, Riegelsberg, Saarbrücken, and Völklingen from the Regionalverbrand Saarbrücken district.

== History ==
Saarbrücken was created in 1957, then known as Saarbrücken-Stadt. In the 1976 through 1998 elections, it was named Saarbrücken I. It acquired its current name in the 2002 election. In the 1957 and 1961 elections, it was constituency 243 in the numbering system. In the 1965 through 1998 elections, it was number 244. Since the 2002 election, it has been number 296.

Originally, the constituency comprised the independent city of Saarbrücken as well as the municipalities of Dudweiler and the Ämter of Brebach, Kleinblittersdorf, and Riegelsberg from the Landkreis Saarbrücken district. In the 1976 through 1998 elections, it comprised the municipalities of Saarbrücken and Kleinblittersdorf from the Saarbrücken district. It acquired its current borders in the 2002 election.

Election	No.	Name	Borders
1957	243	Saarbrücken-Stadt	Saarbrücken city; Landkreis Saarbrücken district (only Dudweiler municipality and Brebach, Kleinblittersdorf, and Riegelsberg Ämter)
1961	243	Saarbrücken-Stadt	Saarbrücken city; Landkreis Saarbrücken district (only Dudweiler municipality and Brebach, Kleinblittersdorf, and Riegelsberg Ämter)
1965	244	Saarbrücken-Stadt	Saarbrücken city; Landkreis Saarbrücken district (only Dudweiler municipality and Brebach, Kleinblittersdorf, and Riegelsberg Ämter)
1969	244	Saarbrücken-Stadt	Saarbrücken city; Landkreis Saarbrücken district (only Dudweiler municipality and Brebach, Kleinblittersdorf, and Riegelsberg Ämter)
1972	244	Saarbrücken-Stadt	Saarbrücken city; Landkreis Saarbrücken district (only Dudweiler municipality and Brebach, Kleinblittersdorf, and Riegelsberg Ämter)
1976	244	Saarbrücken I	Saarbrücken district (only Saarbrücken and Kleinblittersdorf municipalities)
1980	244	Saarbrücken I	Saarbrücken district (only Saarbrücken and Kleinblittersdorf municipalities)
1983	244	Saarbrücken I	Saarbrücken district (only Saarbrücken and Kleinblittersdorf municipalities)
1987	244	Saarbrücken I	Saarbrücken district (only Saarbrücken and Kleinblittersdorf municipalities)
1990	244	Saarbrücken I	Saarbrücken district (only Saarbrücken and Kleinblittersdorf municipalities)
1994	244	Saarbrücken I	Saarbrücken district (only Saarbrücken and Kleinblittersdorf municipalities)
1998	244	Saarbrücken I	Saarbrücken district (only Saarbrücken and Kleinblittersdorf municipalities)
2002	296	Saarbrücken	Regionalverbrand Saarbrücken district (only Großrosseln, Kleinblittersdorf, Püttlingen, Riegelsberg, Saarbrücken, and Völklingen municipalities)
2005	296	Saarbrücken	Regionalverbrand Saarbrücken district (only Großrosseln, Kleinblittersdorf, Püttlingen, Riegelsberg, Saarbrücken, and Völklingen municipalities)
2009	296	Saarbrücken	Regionalverbrand Saarbrücken district (only Großrosseln, Kleinblittersdorf, Püttlingen, Riegelsberg, Saarbrücken, and Völklingen municipalities)
2013	296	Saarbrücken	Regionalverbrand Saarbrücken district (only Großrosseln, Kleinblittersdorf, Püttlingen, Riegelsberg, Saarbrücken, and Völklingen municipalities)
2017	296	Saarbrücken	Regionalverbrand Saarbrücken district (only Großrosseln, Kleinblittersdorf, Püttlingen, Riegelsberg, Saarbrücken, and Völklingen municipalities)
2021	296	Saarbrücken	Regionalverbrand Saarbrücken district (only Großrosseln, Kleinblittersdorf, Püttlingen, Riegelsberg, Saarbrücken, and Völklingen municipalities)
2025	296	Saarbrücken	Regionalverbrand Saarbrücken district (only Großrosseln, Kleinblittersdorf, Püttlingen, Riegelsberg, Saarbrücken, and Völklingen municipalities)

== Members ==
The constituency has been held by the Social Democratic Party (SPD) during all but four Bundestag terms since its creation. It was first represented by Heinrich Schneider of the Free Democratic Party (FDP) from 1957 to 1961, followed by Eugen Huthmacher of the Christian Democratic Union (CDU) from 1961 to 1965. Rudolf Hussong of the SPD won it in 1965 and served one term before being succeeded by Günter Slotta from 1969 to 1976. Hajo Hoffmann was representative from 1976 to 1987, followed by Margit Conrad from 1987 to 1990. Oskar Lafontaine was elected in 1990, but did not accept his mandate at that time; he was re-elected in 1994 and 1998. Elke Ferner was representative from 2002 to 2009, when the constituency was won by Anette Hübinger of the CDU. She was re-elected in 2013. Josephine Ortleb regained the constituency for the SPD in 2017.

Election	Member	Party	%
1957	Heinrich Schneider	FDP	32.3
1961	Eugen Huthmacher	CDU	38.6
1965	Rudolf Hussong	SPD	42.0
1969	Günter Slotta	SPD	47.0
1972	Günter Slotta	SPD	54.9
1976	Hajo Hoffmann	SPD	48.8
1980	Hajo Hoffmann	SPD	53.4
1983	Hajo Hoffmann	SPD	49.8
1987	Margit Conrad	SPD	47.7
1990	Oskar Lafontaine	SPD	55.5
1994	Oskar Lafontaine	SPD	51.9
1998	Oskar Lafontaine	SPD	56.4
2002	Elke Ferner	SPD	51.8
2005	Elke Ferner	SPD	33.5
2009	Anette Hübinger	CDU	31.8
2013	Anette Hübinger	CDU	36.9
2017	Josephine Ortleb	SPD	32.1
2021	Josephine Ortleb	SPD	36.9
2025	Josephine Ortleb	SPD	32.4

== Election results ==
=== 2025 election ===
Federal election (2025): Saarbrücken
Notes:	Blue background denotes the winner of the electorate vote. Pink background denotes a candidate elected from their party list. Yellow background denotes an electorate win by a list member, or other incumbent. A ✓ or ✗ denotes status of any incumbent, win or lose respectively.						
Party	Candidate	Votes	%	±%	Party votes	%	±%
SPD	✓ Josephine Ortleb	47,529	32.4	▼4.5	32,526	22.1	▼16.1
CDU	Yvonne Brück	36,390	24.8	▼0.3	33,745	22.9	▲2.4
AfD	Boris Gamanov	30,329	20.6	▲11.7	29,591	20.1	▲10.8
Left	Jasmin Pies	12,423	8.5	▲2.3	14,566	9.9	▲0.3
Greens	Jeanne Dillschneider	10,868	7.4	▼0.5	14,614	9.9	New
BSW					9,342	6.3	New
FDP	Roland König	5,280	3.6	▼4.7	6,455	4.4	▼7.3
Tierschutzpartei					2,998	2.0	▼0.7
FW	Uwe Schlote	3,524	2.4	▲0.5	1,457	1.0	▼0.6
Volt					1,217	0.8	▼0.3
Pirates					468	0.3	▼0.4
BD					374	0.3	New
MLPD	Rolf Tickert	553	0.4	▲0.2	133	0.1	0.0
Informal votes		1,861			1,271		
Total valid votes		146,896			147,486		
Turnout		148,757	79.4	▲5.4			
SPD hold	Majority	11,139	7.6	▼4.4			

=== 2021 election ===
Federal election (2021): Saarbrücken
Notes:	Blue background denotes the winner of the electorate vote. Pink background denotes a candidate elected from their party list. Yellow background denotes an electorate win by a list member, or other incumbent. A ✓ or ✗ denotes status of any incumbent, win or lose respectively.						
Party	Candidate	Votes	%	±%	Party votes	%	±%
SPD	✓ Josephine Ortleb	51,749	36.9	▲4.7	53,537	38.1	▲11.8
CDU	Annegret Kramp-Karrenbauer	35,252	25.1	▼6.3	28,797	20.5	▼8.0
AfD	Boris Huebner	12,569	9.0	0.0	13,006	9.3	▼0.4
FDP	Helmut Isringhaus	11,647	8.3	▲3.0	16,438	11.7	▲3.6
Green	Gerhard Wenz	11,143	7.9	▲1.9			
Left	Mark Baumeister	8,711	6.2	▼7.1	13,484	9.6	▼5.3
Tierschutzpartei					3,843	2.7	
PARTEI	Lukas Matheis	3,439	2.4		2,764	2.0	▲0.4
FW	Hans Peter Pflug	2,604	1.9	▲0.8	2,191	1.6	▲0.8
dieBasis	Steffi Richter	2,179	1.5		1,923	1.4	
Volt					1,525	1.1	
Pirates					1,009	0.7	▲0.1
Team Todenhöfer					748	0.5	
ÖDP	Nico Herrmann	605	0.4		698	0.5	
NPD					370	0.3	▼0.4
Independent	Stephan Poss	299	0.2				
MLPD	Rolf Tickert	201	0.1	▼0.1	141	0.1	0.0
Informal votes		2,299			2,223		
Total valid votes		140,398			140,474		
Turnout		142,697	74.0	▲0.1			
SPD hold	Majority	16,497	11.8	▲11.0			

=== 2017 election ===
Federal election (2017): Saarbrücken
Notes:	Blue background denotes the winner of the electorate vote. Pink background denotes a candidate elected from their party list. Yellow background denotes an electorate win by a list member, or other incumbent. A ✓ or ✗ denotes status of any incumbent, win or lose respectively.						
Party	Candidate	Votes	%	±%	Party votes	%	±%
SPD	Josephine Ortleb	46,688	32.1	▼4.0	38,322	26.4	▼4.7
CDU	Bernd Wegner	45,664	31.4	▼5.5	41,394	28.5	▼4.9
Left	Gabriele Ungers	19,262	13.3	▲2.3	21,669	14.9	▲3.2
AfD	Wilhelm Müller	12,950	8.9	▲4.8	14,042	9.7	▲4.9
Greens	Patrick Ginsbach	8,782	6.0	▲0.7	11,748	8.1	▲0.2
FDP	Roland König	7,672	5.3	▲3.5	11,753	8.1	▲4.6
PARTEI					2,332	1.6	
FW	Friedemann Klein	1,592	1.1		1,048	0.7	▲0.1
Pirates	Klaus Schummer	1,386	1.0	▼1.9	842	0.6	▼2.4
NPD	Frank Franz	947	0.7	▼1.2	933	0.6	▼1.2
V-Partei³					453	0.3	
BGE					416	0.3	
DM					226	0.2	
MLPD	Rolf Tickert	355	0.2	▲0.1	165	0.1	0.0
PDV					87	0.1	
Informal votes		2,304			2,172		
Total valid votes		145,298			145,430		
Turnout		147,602	73.8	▲4.3			
SPD gain from CDU	Majority	1,024	0.7				

=== 2013 election ===
Federal election (2013): Saarbrücken
Notes:	Blue background denotes the winner of the electorate vote. Pink background denotes a candidate elected from their party list. Yellow background denotes an electorate win by a list member, or other incumbent. A ✓ or ✗ denotes status of any incumbent, win or lose respectively.						
Party	Candidate	Votes	%	±%	Party votes	%	±%
CDU	✓ Anette Hübinger	51,324	36.9	▲5.1	46,513	33.4	▲6.9
SPD	Elke Ferner	50,286	36.2	▲5.8	43,329	31.1	▲7.2
Left	Claudia Kohde-Kilsch	15,202	10.9	▼11.2	16,268	11.7	▼12.3
Greens	Barbara Meyer	7,422	5.3	▼1.4	10,910	7.8	▼0.9
AfD	Rudolf Müller	5,686	4.1		6,575	4.7	
Pirates	Marc Großjean	3,904	2.8		4,110	2.9	▲1.2
NPD	Peter Marx	2,550	1.8	▲0.5	2,582	1.9	▲0.7
FDP	Roland König	2,410	1.7	▼5.6	6,246	4.5	▼7.7
FAMILIE					1,560	1.1	0.0
FW					849	0.6	
PRO					233	0.2	
MLPD	Dietrich Schwang	267	0.2	0.0	160	0.1	0.0
Informal votes		3,349			3,065		
Total valid votes		139,051			139,335		
Turnout		142,400	69.5	▼1.3			
CDU hold	Majority	1,038	0.7	▼0.7			

=== 2009 election ===
Federal election (2009): Saarbrücken
Notes:	Blue background denotes the winner of the electorate vote. Pink background denotes a candidate elected from their party list. Yellow background denotes an electorate win by a list member, or other incumbent. A ✓ or ✗ denotes status of any incumbent, win or lose respectively.						
Party	Candidate	Votes	%	±%	Party votes	%	±%
CDU	Anette Hübinger	45,748	31.8	▲2.0	38,317	26.5	0.0
SPD	✗ Elke Ferner	43,737	30.4	▼3.2	34,528	23.9	▼8.5
Left	Volker Schneider	31,946	22.2	▼4.0	34,666	24.0	▲3.1
FDP	Roland König	10,597	7.4	▲4.0	17,651	12.2	▲4.3
Greens	Karin Burkart	9,696	6.7	▲3.2	12,685	8.8	▲0.9
Pirates					2,536	1.8	
NPD	Peter Marx	1,967	1.4	▼0.2	1,737	1.2	▼0.6
FAMILIE					1,596	1.1	▼0.5
RRP					752	0.5	
MLPD	Reiner Aulenbacher	323	0.2	▲0.1	112	0.1	▼0.1
Informal votes		2,699			2,133		
Total valid votes		144,014			144,580		
Turnout		146,713	70.8	▼6.1			
CDU gain from SPD	Majority	2,011	1.4				

=== 2005 election ===
Federal election (2005):Saarbrücken
Notes:	Blue background denotes the winner of the electorate vote. Pink background denotes a candidate elected from their party list. Yellow background denotes an electorate win by a list member, or other incumbent. A ✓ or ✗ denotes status of any incumbent, win or lose respectively.						
Party	Candidate	Votes	%	±%	Party votes	%	±%
SPD	✓ Elke Ferner	53,035	33.5	▼18.2	51,231	32.4	▼13.5
CDU	Anette Hübinger	47,057	29.8	▼4.3	41,846	26.5	▼4.8
Left	Oskar Lafontaine	41,428	26.2	▲24.7	33,021	20.9	▲18.9
Greens	Tina Schöpfer	5,576	3.5	▼1.4	12,517	7.9	▼2.3
FDP	Karl Addicks	5,266	3.3	▼1.0	12,502	7.9	▲1.2
Familie	Klaus Kühn	3,072	1.9	▲0.7	2,614	1.7	▲0.7
NPD	Peter Marx	2,434	1.5	▲0.4	2,823	1.8	▲0.9
GRAUEN					1,323	0.8	▲0.1
MLPD	Sabine Fricker	223	0.1		217	0.1	
Informal votes		3,305			3,302		
Total valid votes		158,091			158,094		
Turnout		161,396	76.9	▼0.3			
SPD hold	Majority	5,978	3.7				
