= Jan Smudek =

Czech resistance fighter and soldier

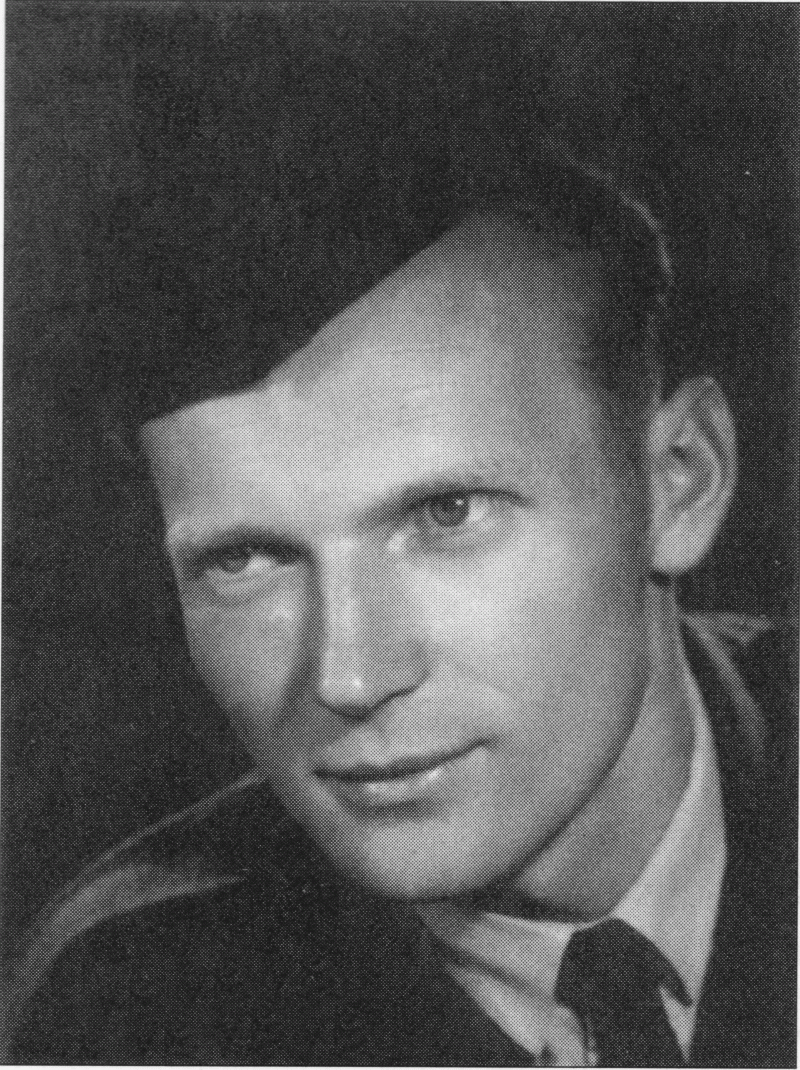
Jan Smudek

Jan Smudek (8 September 1915 – 17 November 1999) was a Czech resistance fighter and soldier nicknamed "The Elusive Jan". His daring actions during the World War II caused international interest and have inspired filmmakers to create films such as Georgian Uchinari Jan (Elusive Jan, 1943) and the renowned American film Casablanca (1942).

== Biography ==
Smudek was born in Bělá nad Radbuzou, however, his family moved to Domažlice soon after his birth. He studied at various industrial schools.

=== World War II ===
In 1939, soon after the Nazi annexation of Czechoslovakia, he studied at School of Engineering in Kladno. Smudek, a member of Sokol and Junák, decided to join the resistance movement. His group had the task to obtain weapons.

On 7 June 1939, Smudek, along with his friend František Petr, attacked and—apparently accidentally—shot and killed Wilhelm Kniest, a German police officer. The subsequent Nazi response led to arrest of 111 people, of whom two died in prison. One of them was František Pavel, mayor of Kladno. The others were transported to Buchenwald concentration camp. The Czech Protectorate press denounced the murder. Smudek and his friend fled to Prague.

He continued his illegal activities up to March, 1940, when the arrests of Domažlice resistance leaders have begun. He has decided to flee from the country, however, it proved to be very complicated. On 20 March 1940, an SS troop led by commander Jakob Neubauer arrived to Smudek's house to search for his suitcase. He led the commander to the attic of the house, where he shot and severely wounded him. In the subsequent chaos, he fled again. He was arrested by two members of German customs border guards (Zollgrenzschutz) near the village of Březí (Plzeň Region); however, he killed both the men and continued escaping. In reaction, Nazis arrested 150 people in Domažlice and deported them to the Flossenbürg concentration camp. They also put a price of 120,000 crowns on his head. Smudek arrived to Prague on 27 March 1940.

He has managed to flee from the Protectorate in April, 1940, with the help of Václav Morávek, a member of the renowned resistance group Three Kings. Later, he travelled through Slovakia, Hungary, Greece, Turkey, Syria and on a boat to France, where he changed his name and joined the Czechoslovak troops in the town of Agde.

However, soon after the Second Armistice at Compiègne, he was forced to escape again. He fled to Algeria and Morocco, then to Martinique, Santa Lucia, Bermudas, Canada and back to Europe, to Great Britain, where he joined the 68th Squadron RAF (in spring 1944) and spent the rest of the war.

While in Morocco, Smudek stayed in the city of Casablanca, under the name Charles Legrand.

=== After the war ===
Smudek came back to Czechoslovakia shortly after the war. He became a national hero; his activities were documented and published in various newspapers and he was interviewed by press. He joined the Czechoslovak People's Party and became active in politics. In 1947, he became a victim of a complot when he helped to transfer anti-communist activists (actually agents of communist Defence Intelligence (in Czech: Obranné zpravodajství)) across the German border. He was arrested and spent two weeks in jail. He was forced to leave the country in 1948, after the Czechoslovak communist coup d'état, when he became an enemy of the state. During his second exile, he lived in France and worked as a private businessman. In the 1990s he came back again to Czechoslovakia.

He was married to Margaret Bush (from Manchester) and had two daughters, Ivona and Nikola.

He died in obscurity in 1999, in Díly u Domažlic.

== Criticism ==
As an émigré, Smudek became undesirable for the needs of the Czechoslovak communist propaganda. His activities were denounced by communist historians. He has been labelled as an irresponsible individual whose activities led to death of innocent people. His legacy was perceived as controversial also in his native Chodsko.

== Awards ==
- Czechoslovak War Cross 1939
- Czechoslovak Medal for Bravery before the Enemy
- Czechoslovak Medal of Merit (Second Grade)

== In fiction ==
Smudek's life story inspired several documents and works of art:

- Casablanca, USA, 1942
- Wanted By The Gestapo – short comics story published by the US magazine True Comics in December 1943. He was renamed to "Jan Smutek" in the comics.
- Uchinari Jan (Неуловимый Ян, Elusive Jan), Georgian film made in 1943; directed by Vladimir Petrov; produced by Tbilisi Kinostudia; title role Yevgeny Samoylov
- Nepolapitelný Jan (Elusive Jan), documentary by the Czech Television, 2008
