= Dionys Jobst =

German politician (1927–2017)

Member of the Bundestag
- In office 20 October 1969 – 26 October 1998
- Constituency: Burglengenfeld / Schwandorf

Chair of the Bundestag Committee on Transport
- In office 1988–1998

Personal details
- Born: 5 September 1927 Teublitz, Bavaria, Weimar Republic
- Died: 25 March 2017 (aged 89)
- Party: Christian Social Union
- Education: Ludwig-Maximilians-Universität München
- Occupation: Lawyer, railway official, politician

Dionys Jobst (5 September 1927 – 25 March 2017) was a German lawyer, railway official and politician of the Christian Social Union (CSU). He was a member of the Bundestag from 20 October 1969 to 26 October 1998, representing the Burglengenfeld constituency, later renamed Schwandorf, by direct mandate. He chaired the Bundestag's Committee on Transport from 1988 to 1998.

== Early life and education ==
Jobst was born in Teublitz in the Upper Palatinate and attended an Oberrealschule. From 1943 to 1945 he served as a Flakhelfer, in the Reich Labour Service and in the Wehrmacht. He was wounded and taken prisoner. On 20 March 1944 he applied for membership of the Nazi Party (NSDAP) and was admitted on 20 April 1944, with membership number 10,116,768.

He completed his Abitur in 1947 and studied law at the Ludwig-Maximilians-Universität München until 1950. He passed the first state law examination in 1951, received a doctorate in law in 1954 and passed the second state examination in 1955.

== Civil service career ==
Jobst worked as a Regierungsassessor for the government of the Upper Palatinate in Regensburg and then as a legal officer at a district office. In January 1956 he joined the Deutsche Bundesbahn, where his last post was as a department head (Dezernent) at the Regensburg railway directorate.

He was a member of the supervisory board of Erste Bayerische Basaltstein AG Steinmühle, a member of the administrative board of the Deutsche Siedlungs- und Landesrentenbank and a board member of the German friends' association of Tel Aviv University.

== Political career ==
Jobst joined the CSU in 1959. He was a member of the Teublitz town council from 1960 to 1991, the Burglengenfeld district council from 1960 to 1972 and the Schwandorf district council from 1972 to 1996. From 1965 to 1972 he chaired the CSU district association in Burglengenfeld.

=== Member of the Bundestag ===
Jobst won the Burglengenfeld constituency in the 1969 federal election and sat in the CDU/CSU parliamentary group. He was re-elected at each election until 1994. He did not stand in the 1998 election and left the Bundestag on 26 October 1998.

He was president of the cross-party parliamentary group on railways and chairman of the German–Japanese parliamentary friendship group. In 1990 the Japanese government awarded him the Order of the Rising Sun, Grand Cordon.

On 9 July 1993 Bild published a front-page story stating that members of the Bundestag were considering leasing or buying Majorca from Spain for 50 billion marks and make it the country's seventeenth state. Jobst said, the idea was meant as a joke during a conversation about transport matters and that some readers took it literally.

=== Chair of the Committee on Transport ===
Jobst was a member of the Bundestag's Committee on Transport from 1980 and its chairman from 1988 until he left parliament in 1998. As chairman he presented the committee's reports and recommendations to the plenary.

== Personal life and death ==
Jobst was Roman Catholic, married, and had three children. He lived in Teublitz and died on 25 March 2017 at the age of 89.

== Honours ==
- Cross of Merit on ribbon (1978)
- Bavarian Order of Merit (1980)
- Cross of Merit, 1st Class (1983)
- Order of the Rising Sun, Grand Cordon (Japan, 1990)

== Literature ==
- Habel, Walter, ed. (1985). Wer ist wer? Das deutsche Who's Who (in German) (24th ed.). Lübeck: Schmidt-Römhild. p. 585. ISBN 3-7950-2005-0.
- Vierhaus, Rudolf; Herbst, Ludolf, eds. (2002). Biographisches Handbuch der Mitglieder des Deutschen Bundestages 1949–2002 (in German). Vol. 1: A–M. Munich: K. G. Saur.
