= Karl Holmeier =

German politician

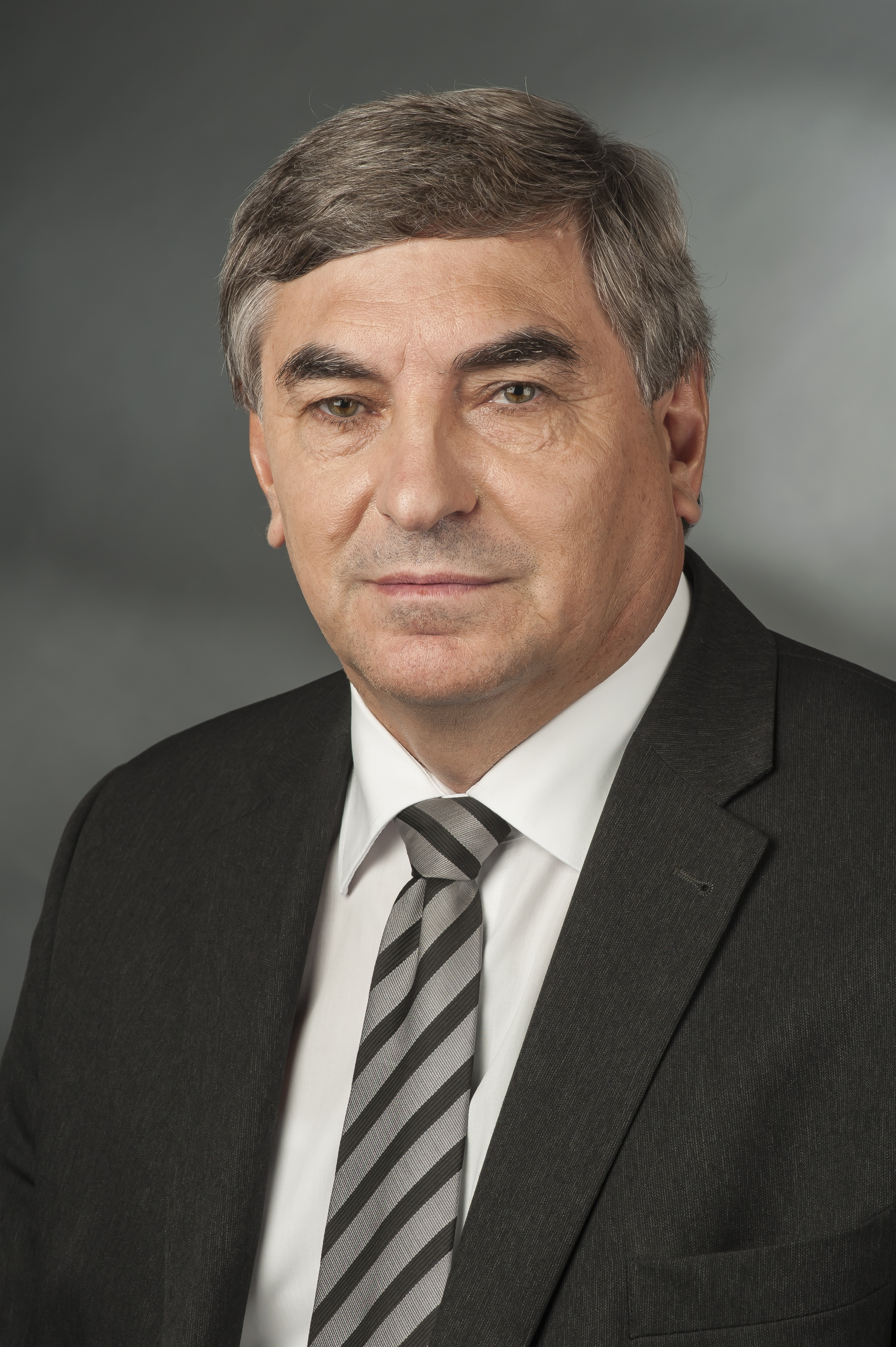
- Holmeier in 2014

Member of the Bundestag; for Schwandorf
- In office 27 October 2009 – 26 October 2021
- Preceded by: Klaus Hofbauer
- Succeeded by: Martina Englhardt-Kopf

Personal details
- Born: 10 September 1956 (age 69) Weiding, West Germany
- Party: Christian Social Union
- Children: 3

Karl Holmeier (born 10 September 1956) is a German politician of the Christian Social Union (CSU) who served as a member of the Bundestag from the state of Bavaria from 2009 until 2021.

== Political career ==
Holmeier became a member of the Bundestag in the 2009 German federal election, representing the Schwandorf constituency. He was a member of the Committee on Transport and Digital Infrastructure.

In June 2020, Holmeier announced that he would not stand in the 2021 federal elections but instead resign from active politics by the end of the parliamentary term.

== Political positions ==
In June 2017, Holmeier voted against Germany's introduction of same-sex marriage.
