= Bělá nad Radbuzou =

- Town
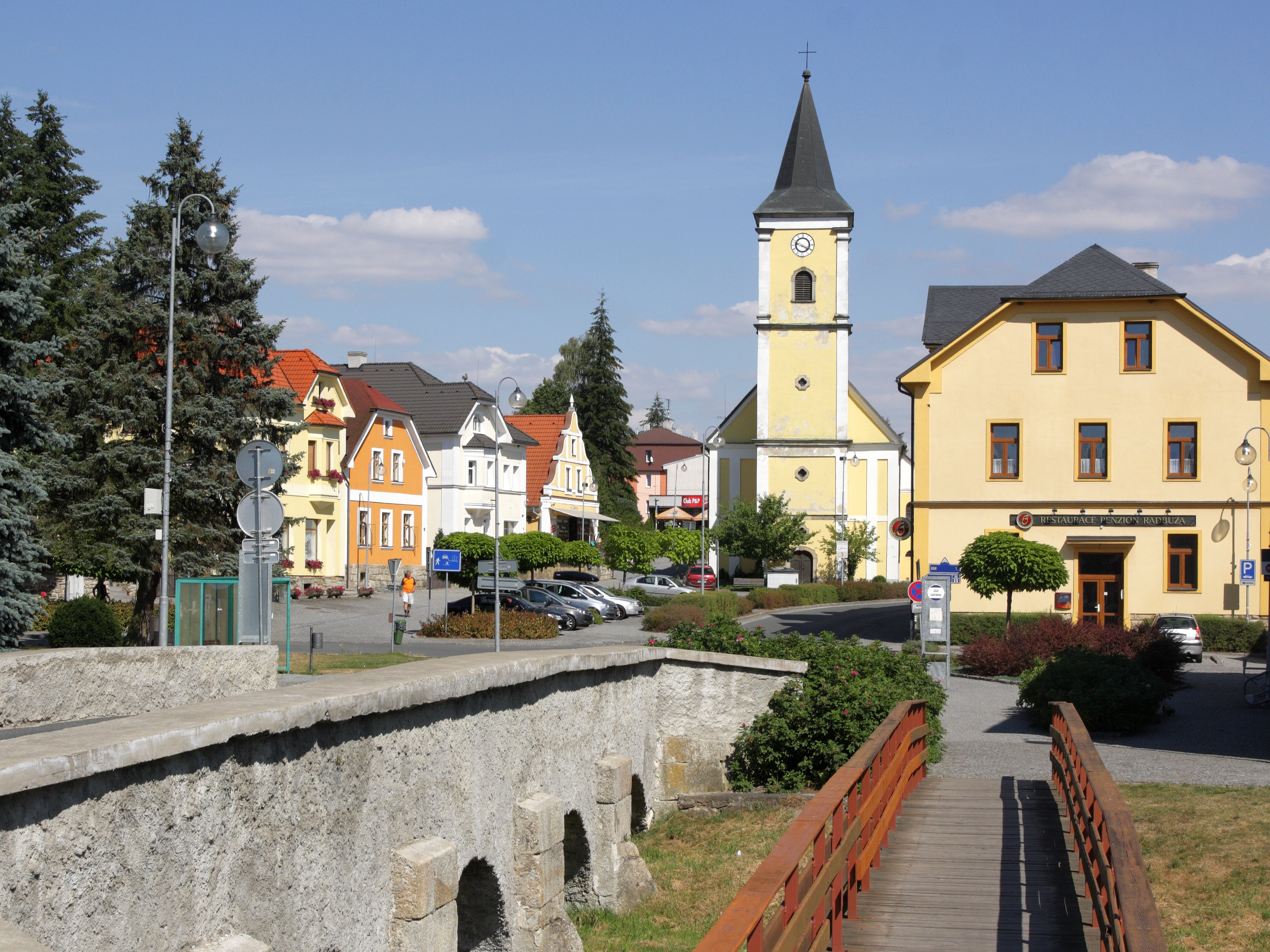
- Bridge over the Bezděkovský potok and the town square

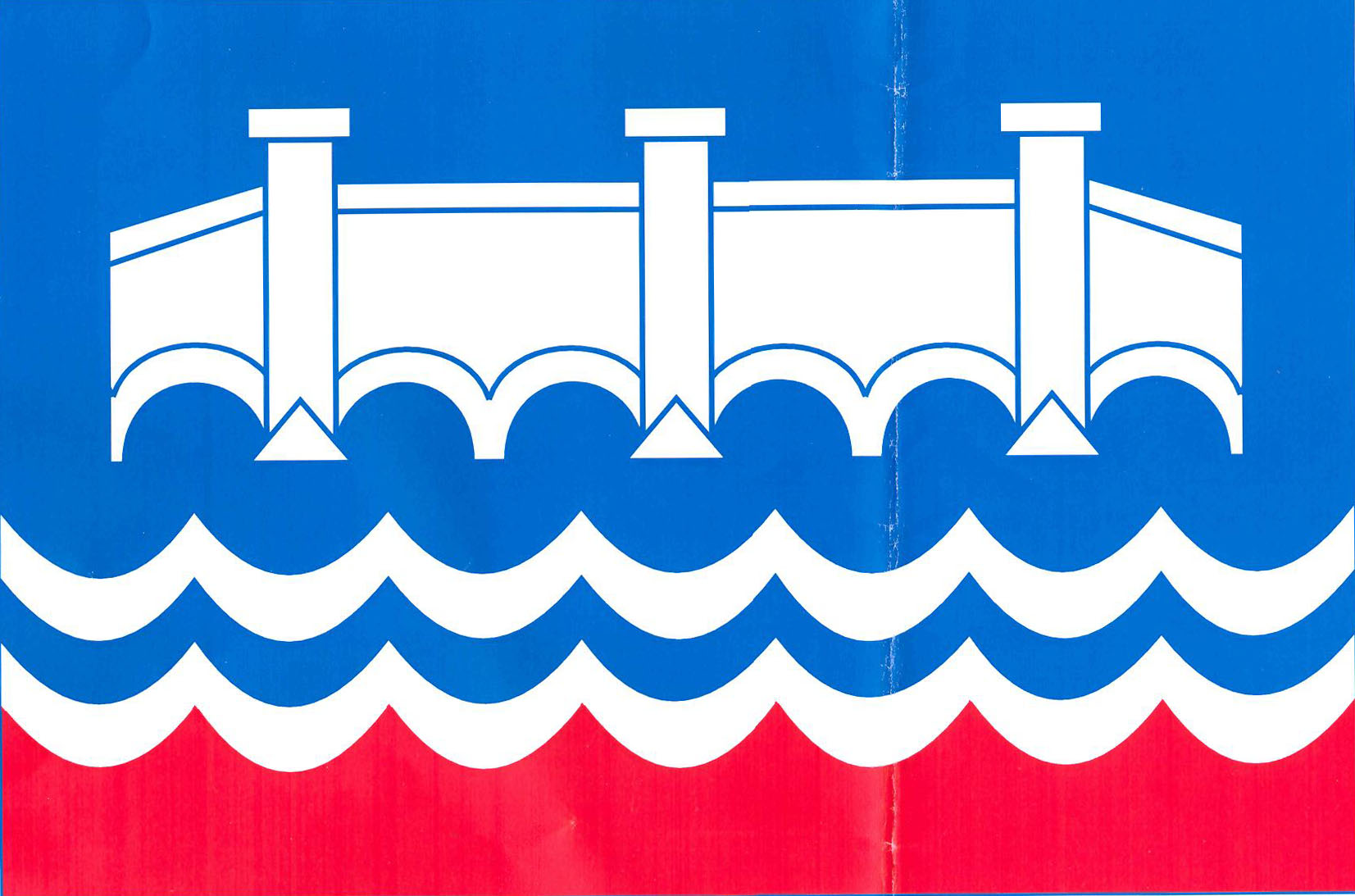
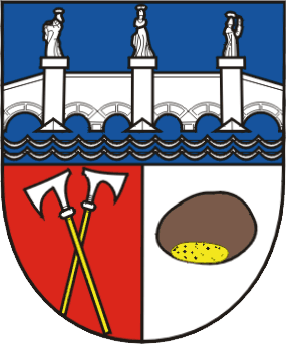
- Flag Coat of arms

- Location in the Czech Republic
- Coordinates: 49°35′36″N 12°42′48″E
- Country: Czech Republic
- Region: Plzeň
- District: Domažlice
- First mentioned: 1121

Government
  - Mayor: Libor Picka

Area
  - Total: 83.32 km^{2} (32.17 sq mi)
- Elevation: 442 m (1,450 ft)

Population (2026-01-01)
  - Total: 1,733
  - Density: 20.80/km^{2} (53.87/sq mi)
- Time zone: UTC+1 (CET)
  - Summer (DST): UTC+2 (CEST)
- Postal codes: 345 25, 345 26
- Website: www.belanr.cz

Bělá nad Radbuzou (Czech pronunciation: [ˈbjɛlaː ˈnad radbuzou]; German: Weißensulz) is a town in Domažlice District in the Plzeň Region of the Czech Republic. It has about 1,700 inhabitants. The town is located on the Radbuza River, on the border between the Podčeskoleská Hills and Upper Palatine Forest.

== Administrative division ==
Bělá nad Radbuzou consists of 12 municipal parts (in brackets population according to the 2021 census):

- Bělá nad Radbuzou (1,361)
- Bystřice (17)
- Čečín (12)
- Černá Hora (7)
- Doubravka (15)
- Hleďsebe (0)
- Karlova Huť (2)
- Nový Dvůr (2)
- Pleš (2)
- Smolov (103)
- Újezd Svatého Kříže (161)
- Železná (37)

== Etymology ==
The name Bělá was probably derived from the Radbuza River, which used to be called here Bílý potok ('white stream').

== Geography ==
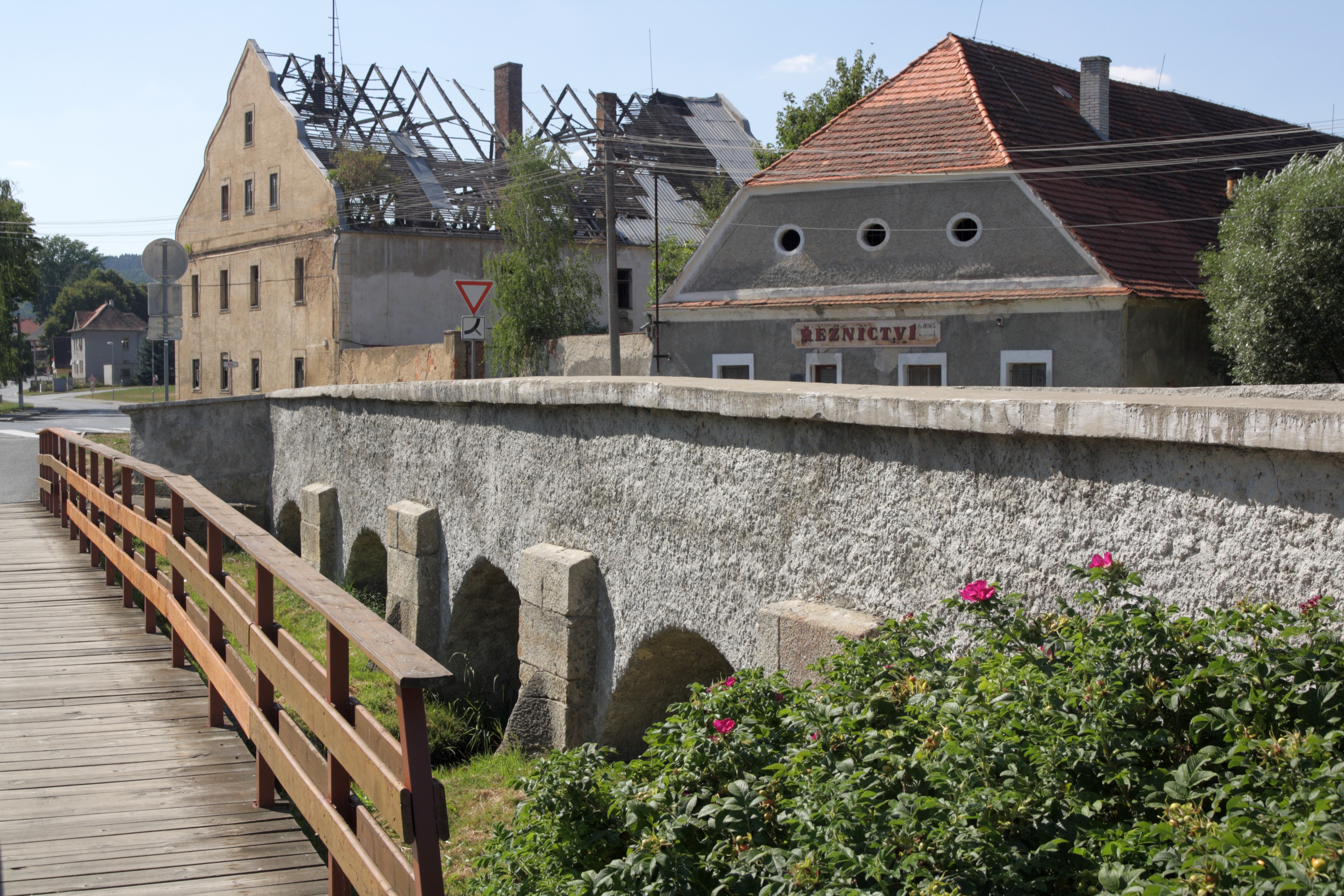
Bridge over the Bezděkovský potok and the burnt-out castle

Bělá nad Radbuzou is located about 9 kilometres (6 mi) north of Domažlice and 37 km (23 mi) southwest of Plzeň. The town is situated at the confluence of the Radbuza River and the stream Bezděkovský potok. The built-up area lies in the Podčeskoleská Hills, but most of the municipal territory lies in the Upper Palatine Forest and borders Germany in the west.

== History ==
The first written mention of Bělá nad Radbuzou is from 1121, when the near Přimda Castle was built. Until 1600, Bělá nad Radbuzou was a part of the Přimda estate. In the 16th century, it became a property of Lamminger of Albenreuth, a Bavarian noble family. In 1614 the Lamminger family built a small Renaissance castle and a brewery. After the Battle of White Mountain, in 1623, the estate was merged with Újezd Svatého Kříže and the castle ceased to serve as the seat of the estate. In 2014, the castle burned down.

== Demographics ==
Historical population

Year	Pop.	±%
1869	6,029	—
1880	6,608	+9.6%
1890	6,614	+0.1%
1900	6,634	+0.3%
1910	6,966	+5.0%

Year	Pop.	±%
1921	6,885	−1.2%
1930	6,786	−1.4%
1950	2,020	−70.2%
1961	1,765	−12.6%
1970	1,712	−3.0%

Year	Pop.	±%
1980	1,573	−8.1%
1991	1,707	+8.5%
2001	1,727	+1.2%
2011	1,735	+0.5%
2021	1,719	−0.9%

Source: Censuses

== Transport ==
Bělá nad Radbuzou is located on the railway line Domažlice–Planá.

== Sights ==
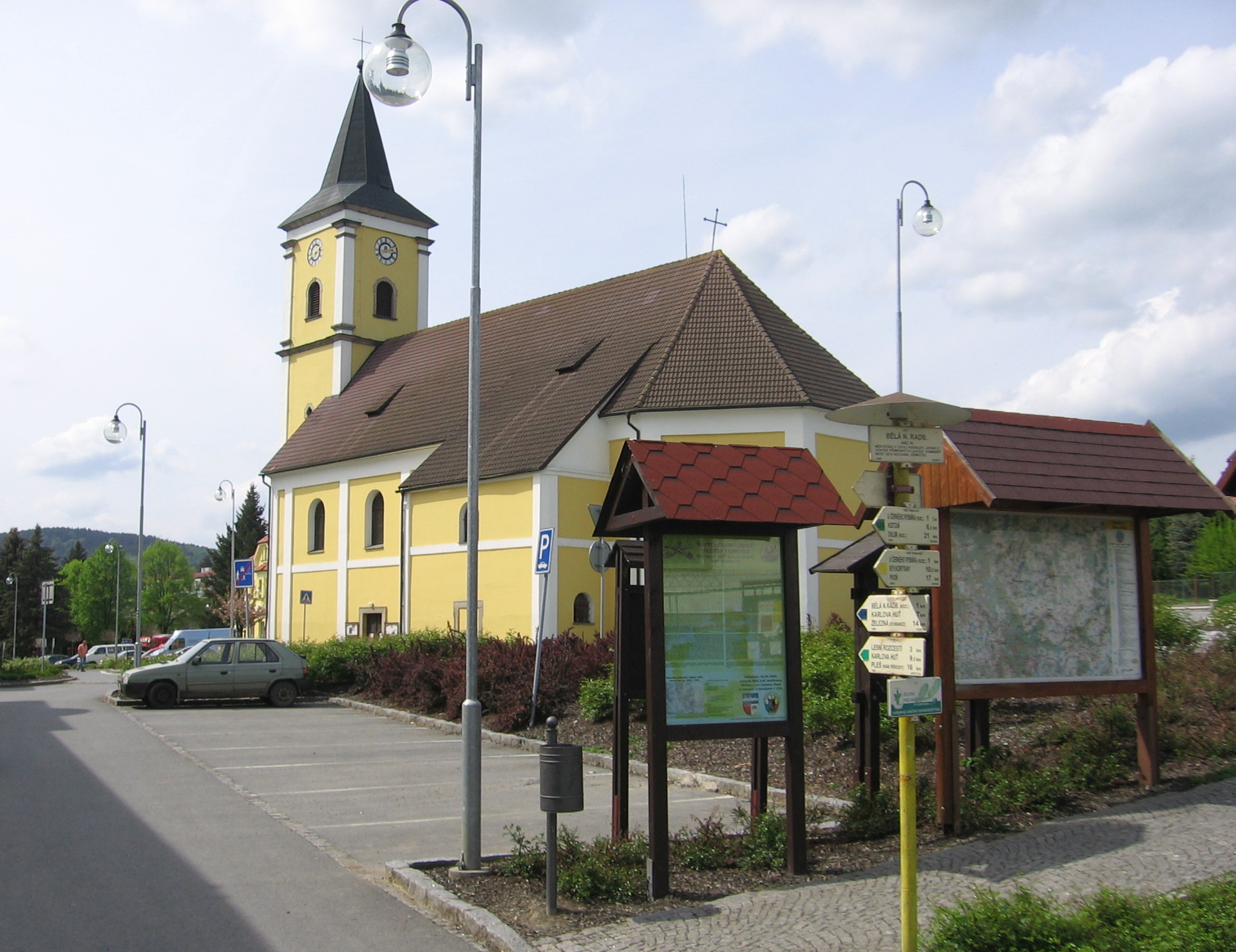
Church of Our Lady of Sorrows

The main landmark of the town centre is the Church of Our Lady of Sorrows. It was built in 1721 on the site of a chapel from the late 17th century. The church was completely rebuilt into its current Neoclassical form in 1826–1846.

A cultural monument is the stone bridge over the Bezděkovský potok from 1820.

== Notable people ==
- Jan Smudek (1915–1999), resistance fighter
- Hans Drachsler (1916–1996), German politician

== Twin towns – sister cities ==
Bělá nad Radbuzou is twinned with:

- Eslarn, Germany
- Hindelbank, Switzerland
