= Martina Englhardt-Kopf =

German politician (born 1981)

Martina Englhardt-Kopf MdB
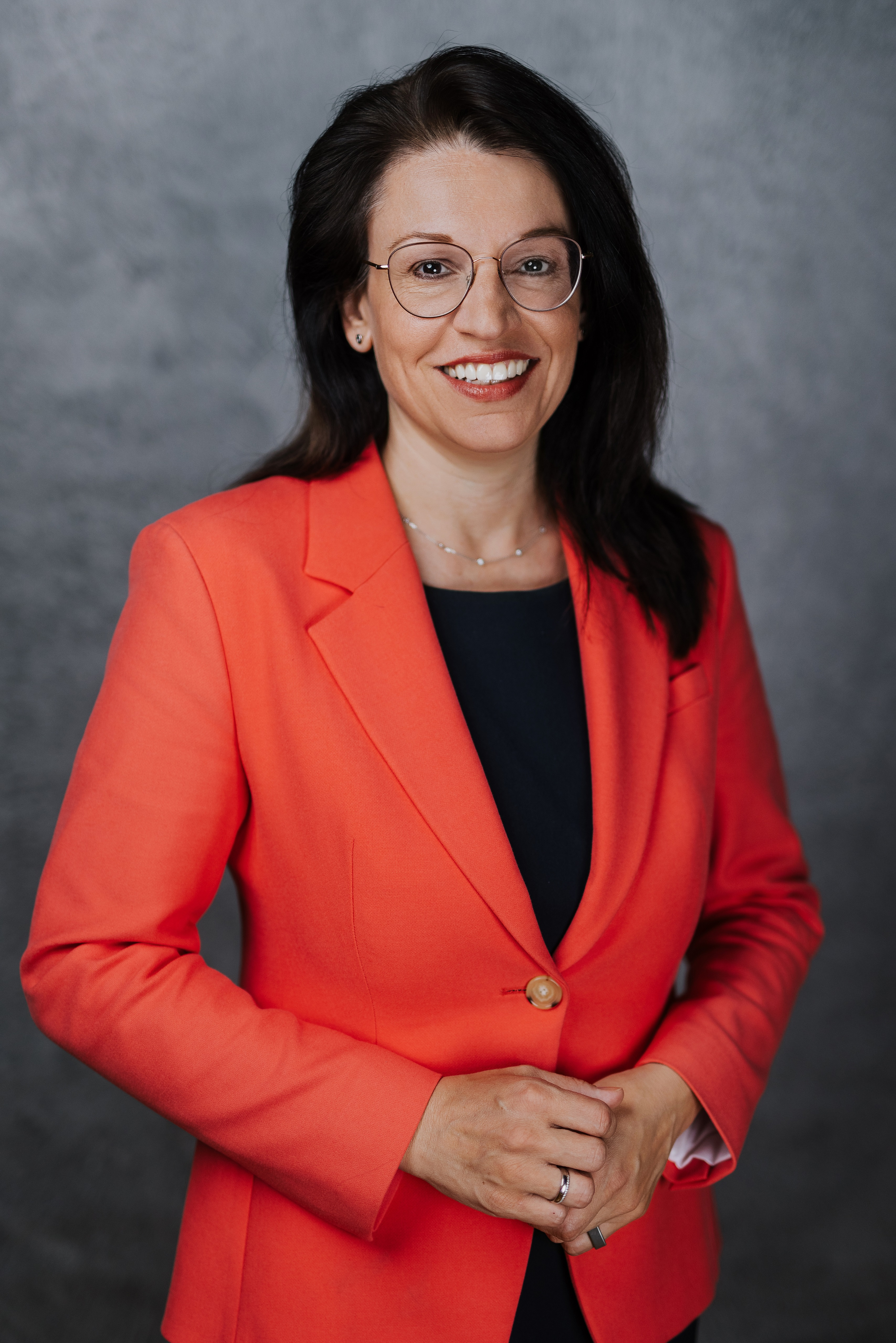
- Englhardt-Kopf in 2025

Member of the Bundestag; for Schwandorf
- Incumbent
- Assumed office 26 October 2021
- Preceded by: Karl Holmeier

Personal details
- Born: 8 June 1981 (age 45) Schwandorf, West Germany
- Party: Christian Social Union
- Education: University of Erlangen–Nuremberg; University of Hull

Martina Englhardt-Kopf (born 8 June 1981) is a German teacher and politician of the Christian Social Union (CSU) who has been serving as a member of the Bundestag since 2021.

In addition to her work in parliament, Englhardt-Kopf has been serving as Parliamentary State Secretary at the Federal Ministry of Food and Agriculture in the government of Chancellor Friedrich Merz since 2025.

== Early life and career ==
Englhardt-Kopf was born in 1981 in the West German town of Schwandorf.

== Political career ==
Since the 2021 elections, Englhardt-Kopf has been a member of the Bundestag, representing the Schwandorf district. In parliament, served on the Committee on Transport and the Committee on Petitions. In addition to her committee assignments, she is part of the German Parliamentary Friendship Group for Relations with Slovakia, the Czech Republic and Hungary.

== Other activities ==
- German Catholic Women's Association (KDFB), Vice-President (since 2023)
- Federal Network Agency for Electricity, Gas, Telecommunications, Posts and Railway (BNetzA), Member of the Rail Infrastructure Advisory Council (since 2022)
