= Hans Drachsler =

German politician

Member of the Landtag of Bavaria
- In office 3 December 1970 – 30 October 1978
- Preceded by: Multi-member district
- Succeeded by: Rudolf Gütlein
- Constituency: Upper Bavaria (1970–1974); Munich-Ramersdorf (1974–1978)

Member of the Bundestag; for Burglengenfeld
- In office 15 October 1957 – 19 October 1965
- Preceded by: Karl Kahn
- Succeeded by: Alois Niederalt

Personal details
- Born: 10 March 1916 Pleš, Austria-Hungary
- Died: 18 October 1996 (aged 80) Munich, Germany
- Party: Christian Social Union
- Children: 2
- Education: University of Prague; LMU Munich; University of Würzburg

Hans Drachsler (10 March 1916 – 18 October 1996) was a German politician, representative of the Christian Social Union in Bavaria.

He was a member of the Landtag of Bavaria between 1970 and 1978, and was a member of the Bundestag.

== See also ==
- List of Bavarian Christian Social Union politicians
