= Díly =

- Municipality
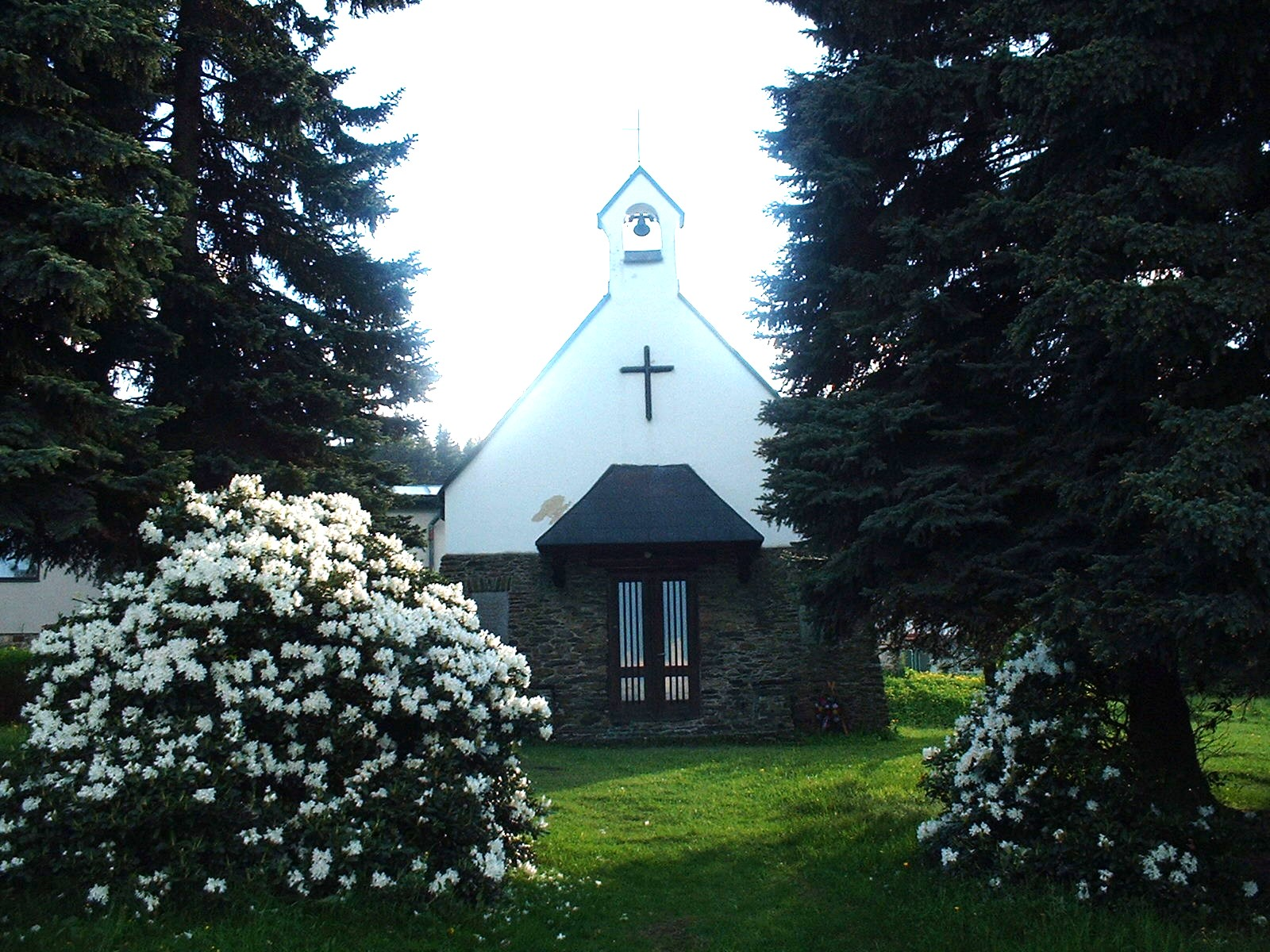
- Chapel of Saints Cyril and Methodius

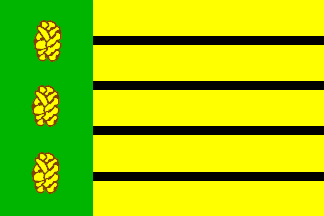
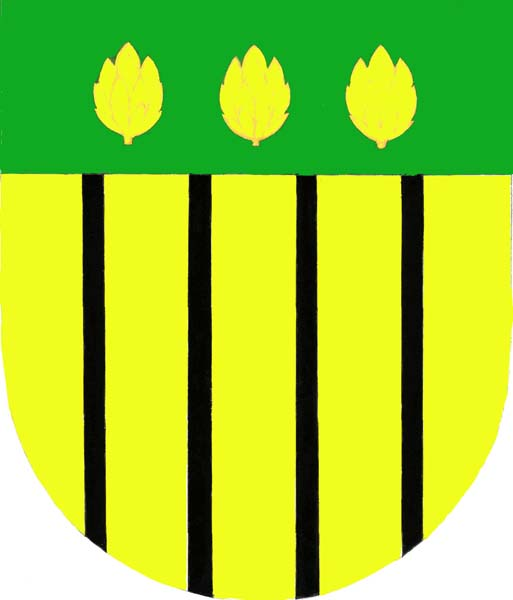
- Flag Coat of arms

- Location in the Czech Republic
- Coordinates: 49°26′47″N 12°47′11″E
- Country: Czech Republic
- Region: Plzeň
- District: Domažlice
- First mentioned: 1839

Area
  - Total: 1.40 km^{2} (0.54 sq mi)
- Elevation: 582 m (1,909 ft)

Population (2026-01-01)
  - Total: 379
  - Density: 271/km^{2} (701/sq mi)
- Time zone: UTC+1 (CET)
  - Summer (DST): UTC+2 (CEST)
- Postal code: 344 01
- Website: www.obec-dily.cz

Díly is a municipality and village in Domažlice District in the Plzeň Region of the Czech Republic. It has about 400 inhabitants.

Díly lies approximately 11 kilometres (7 mi) west of Domažlice, 54 km (34 mi) south-west of Plzeň, and 138 km (86 mi) south-west of Prague.

== Demographics ==
Historical population
Year	Pop.	±%
1869	426	—
1880	457	+7.3%
1890	447	−2.2%
1900	466	+4.3%
1910	573	+23.0%
1921	522	−8.9%
1930	472	−9.6%
1950	319	−32.4%
1961	373	+16.9%
1970	375	+0.5%
1980	382	+1.9%
1991	375	−1.8%
2001	374	−0.3%
2011	376	+0.5%
2021	367	−2.4%
Source: Censuses

== Twin towns – sister cities ==
Díly is twinned with:

- Rötz, Germany
