= Tina Winklmann =

German politician (born 1980)

Member of the Bundestag
- Incumbent
- Assumed office 26 October 2021
- Constituency: Bavaria

Personal details
- Born: 26 February 1980 (age 46) Weiden in der Oberpfalz, West Germany
- Party: Alliance 90/The Greens

Tina Winklmann (born 26 February 1980) is a German politician of Alliance 90/The Greens who has been serving as a member of the Bundestag since the 2021 elections.

== Early career ==
From 2001 to 2019, Winklmann worked at a Siemens site in Amberg.

== Political career ==
Winklmann became a member of the Alliance 90/The Greens party in 1996.

In parliament, Winklmann has been serving on the Committee on Labour and Social Affairs and the Sports Committee. In addition to her committee assignments, she is part of the Parliamentary Friendship Group for Relations with Slovakia, the Czech Republic and Hungary.

== Other activities ==
- IG Metall, Member.
