= Anette Hübinger =

German politician (born 1955)

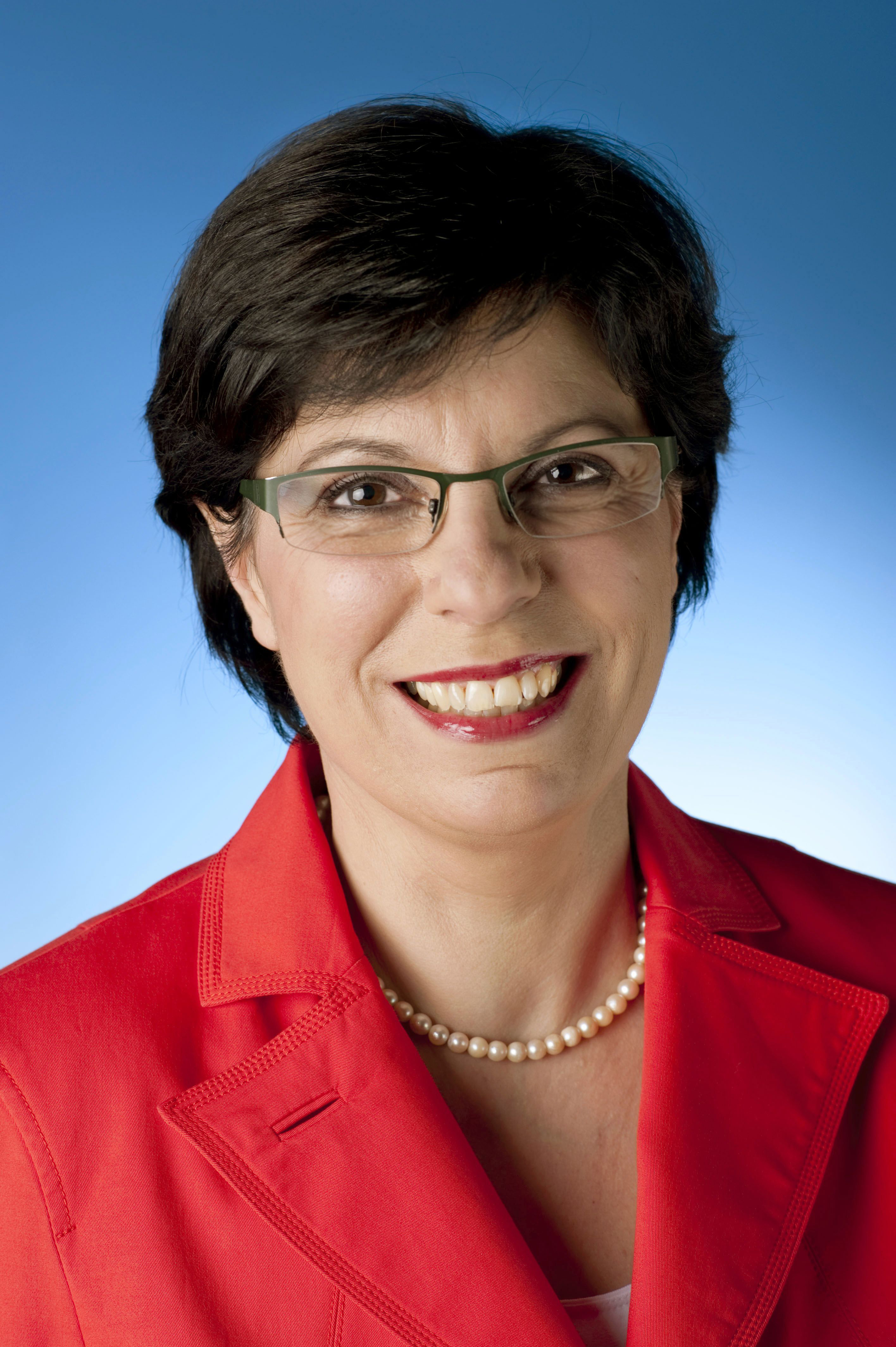
- Hübinger in 2010

Member of the Bundestag
- In office 18 October 2005 – 24 October 2017

Personal details
- Born: 9 July 1955 (age 70) Neunkirchen, Saar Protectorate
- Party: Christian Democratic Union
- Children: 1

Anette Hübinger (born 9 July 1955) is a German politician of the Christian Democratic Union. From 2005 to 2017, she served as a member of the Bundestag.

== Life and career ==
=== Early and personal life ===
After graduating from the girls' secondary school in Neunkirchen in 1974, Hübinger studied law at Saarland University in Saarbrücken, which she completed in 1981 with the first state examination in law. After completing her legal clerkship, she also passed the second state examination in 1984 and worked as a consultant in the office of Werner Schreiber, member of the Bundestag, until 1989.

Anette Hübinger is Roman Catholic, married and the mother of one son.

=== Political career ===
Hübinger joined the CDU in 1985 and has been deputy chairwoman of the Saarbrücken-Stadt CDU district association since 2000. In 1999 she became honorary district mayor of Halberg.

From 2005 to 2017, Hübinger was a member of the Bundestag. In the 2005 federal election, she entered the Bundestag via the Saarland state list. In the 2009 election, she succeeded in winning a direct mandate for the CDU in the Saarbrücken constituency for the first time since Saarland joined the Federal Republic. She was able to assert herself with 31.8% against the social democrat Elke Ferner. In the 2013 federal election, she again defended her direct mandate against Ferner.

In the 16th and 17th legislative periods, Hübinger was a full member of the Committee for Economic Cooperation and Development and the Committee for Education, Research and Technology Assessment. She was also a deputy member of the Committee for Transport, Construction and Urban Development. In 2014, she became a full member of the Budget Committee and a member of the Subcommittee on European Union issues, as well as a deputy member of the Committee on Education, Research and Technology Assessment.
