= Marianne Schieder =

German politician

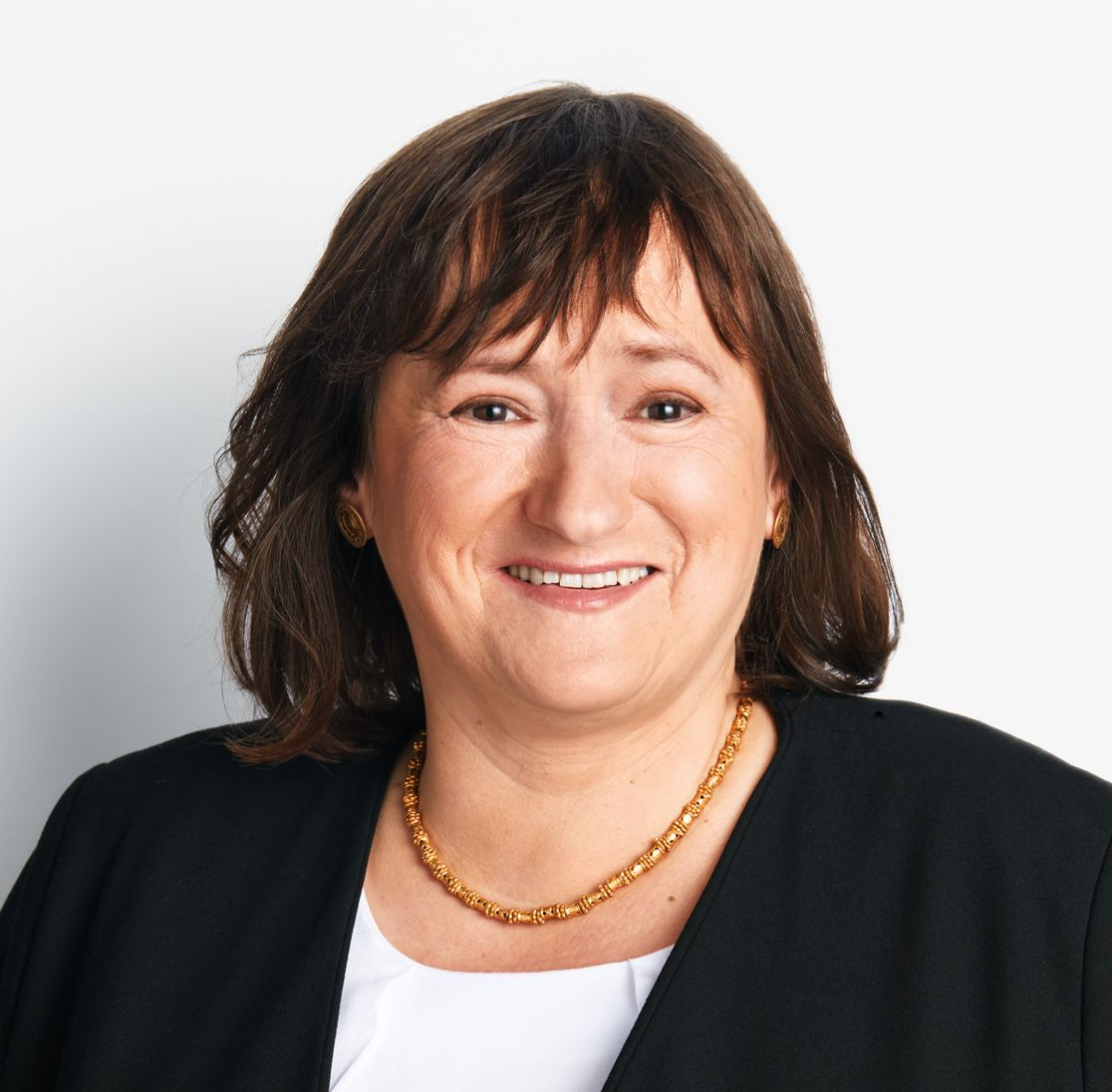
- Marianne Schieder in 2017

Member of the Bundestag
- Incumbent
- Assumed office 2005

Personal details
- Born: 23 May 1962 (age 64) Schwarzberg, Wernberg-Köblitz, West Germany (now Germany)
- Party: SPD
- Education: University of Regensburg

Marianne Schieder (born 23 May 1962) is a German politician of the Social Democratic Party (SPD) who has been serving as a member of the Bundestag from the state of Bavaria since 2005.

== Early life and career ==
After completing her Abitur at the Johann-Andreas-Schmeller Gymnasium in Nabburg, she began her law studies at the University of Regensburg, where she successfully passed the Second State Examination in Law. In her professional career, she served as the Federal Chairwoman of the Catholic Rural Youth Movement (KLJB) and also worked as the State Managing Director of KLJB Bavaria. In these positions, she passionately advocated for the interests of young people in rural areas and promoted social and political participation within the Catholic youth community.

== Political career ==
From 1994 to 2004, Schieder was a member of the State Parliament of Bavaria.

Schieder first became a member of the Bundestag in the 2005 German federal election. In parliament, she is a member of the Committee on the Verification of Credentials and Immunities and the Committee on Culture and the Media. She is also a member of the parliament’s Council of Elders, which – among other duties – determines daily legislative agenda items and assigning committee chairpersons based on party representation.

From 2009 to 2017, Schieder was part of the SPD’s leadership in Bavaria, under its chairman Florian Pronold.

== Other activities ==
- Haus der Geschichte, Member of the Board of Trustees (since 2022)
- Foundation Flight, Expulsion, Reconciliation, Member of the Board of Trustees
- Memorial to the Murdered Jews of Europe Foundation, Member of the Board of Trustees
- German Catholic Women's Association (KDFB), Member
- German United Services Trade Union (ver.di), Member
