= 2026 Mecklenburg-Vorpommern state election =

German state election

- 20 September 2026

All 71 seats in the Landtag 36 seats needed for a majority
- Turnout: 1,024,251 (78.1%) ▲7.3pp

	First party	Second party	Third party
Candidate	Leif-Erik Holm (Note: Holm, member of the federal parliament, is the AfD candidate for minister-president only, not running for state parliament except challenging Schwesig in her constituency Schwerin I (de), while Enrico Schult is first place on the party list, making Schult the 'lead candidate' for state parliament; both are co-chairs of the AfD state chapter.. AfD had the same approach to 2026 Baden-Württemberg state election)	Manuela Schwesig	Simone Oldenburg
Party	AfD	SPD	Linke
Last election	16.7%, 14 seats	39.6%, 34 seats	9.9%, 9 seats
Seats won	32	29	5
Seat change	▲18	▼5	▼4
Popular vote	388,026	360,393	66,388
Percentage	38.2%	35.5%	6.5%
Swing	▲21.5pp	▼4.1pp	▼3.4pp
	Fourth party	Fifth party
Candidate	Claudia Müller	Daniel Peters
Party	Greens	CDU
Last election	6.3%, 5 seats	13.3%, 12 seats
Seats won	5	0
Seat change	Steady	▼12
Popular vote	57,587	49,629
Percentage	5.7%	4.9%
Swing	▼0.6pp	▼8.4pp
- Results for the single-member constituencies and party-list
Government before election
Second Schwesig cabinet
SPD–Left
Government after election
Third Schwesig cabinet
SPD–Left–Greens

The 2026 Mecklenburg-Vorpommern state election was held on 20 September 2026 to elect the 9th Landtag of Mecklenburg-Vorpommern. The 2026 Berlin state election took place on the same day, two weeks after the AfD won the 2026 Saxony-Anhalt state election that potentially mobilised support for the Social Democratic Party (SPD).

The election had a high voter turnout of 78.1%. The Alternative for Germany (AfD) doubled its vote share to 38%, but did not form a government due to the German firewall policy. The governing Social Democratic Party (SPD) suffered minor losses, dropping to 35%, while the co-governing The Left and the Greens held on to five seats each. The Christian Democratic Union (CDU) with 4.9% and the Free Democratic Party (FDP) at 1.0% failed to pass the 5% electoral threshold, losing all their representation. The Sahra Wagenknecht Alliance (BSW) with 4.8% also failed to secure any seats.

This was the first time in history that the CDU failed to win seats in a state election. CDU leader and Chancellor Friedrich Merz, who was in the midst of a government crisis at the time, called the result disastrous but vowed to stay on as chancellor. This was also the first time the SPD was not returned as the largest party in a Mecklenburg-Vorpommern election since 1994.

== Election date ==
Under the Constitution of Mecklenburg-Vorpommern, a state election must be held between 58 and 61 months after the start of the legislative period. The 8th Landtag of Mecklenburg-Vorpommern was constituted on 26 October 2021. No early dissolution of the parliament occurred. The election date was set to 20 September 2026, within the permissible window of 30 August to 22 November 2026.

== Electoral system ==
The Landtag of Mecklenburg-Vorpommern comprises at least 71 seats, with 36 allocated in single-member constituencies via first-past-the-post voting and the rest through closed party lists. German citizens aged 16 or older who have resided in the state for at least 37 days are eligible to vote, while those aged 18 or older with at least three months of primary residence in Mecklenburg-Vorpommern can stand for election, unless barred by a final court ruling. Seats are distributed using the Hare/Niemeyer method.

== Background ==
Results of Mecklenburg-Vorpommern state elections with abstentions (Nichtwähler) usually having a higher share than any party, save for the 1998 election held in connection with the federal election, and 2026

Erwin Sellering (SPD), who was Minister-President since 2008, resigned in 2017 due to ill health, proposing Federal Minister of Family Affairs Manuela Schwesig as successor. She resigned from the third Merkel cabinet and continued with the SPD-CDU coalition. After a landslide win in 2021, the SPD formed the Second Schwesig cabinet with The Left.

The SPD has been the largest party at the state level since the 1998 election, though in recent federal elections the state has trended toward the AfD and CDU.

During the final weeks of the election, the 2026 Merz government crisis was ongoing.

== Parties ==
The table below lists parties represented in the 8th Landtag of Mecklenburg-Vorpommern (2021–2026).

Name		Ideology	2021 result		Pre-2026 election
Name		Ideology	Votes (%)	Seats	
SPD	Social Democratic Party of Germany; Sozialdemokratische Partei Deutschlands	Social democracy	39.6%	34 / 79	34 / 79
AfD	Alternative for Germany; Alternative für Deutschland	Right-wing populism	16.7%	14 / 79	14 / 79
CDU	Christian Democratic Union of Germany; Christlich Demokratische Union Deutschlands	Christian democracy	13.3%	12 / 79	12 / 79
Linke	The Left; Die Linke	Democratic socialism	9.9%	9 / 79	9 / 79
Grüne	Alliance 90/The Greens; Bündnis 90/Die Grünen	Green politics	6.3%	5 / 79	4 / 79
FDP	Free Democratic Party; Freie Demokratische Partei	Classical liberalism	5.8%	5 / 79	3 / 79
Ind.	Independent; Fraktionslos	–	–	0 / 79	3 / 79

The following minor parties submitted a state list of candidates to the returning officer and were approved to appear on the ballot:

- Alliance C – Christians for Germany (Bündnis C)
- Communist Party of Germany (KPD)
- Ecological-Democratic Party (ÖDP)
- Free Voters (FW)
- Party Human Climate Animal-Protection (Tierschutzpartei)
- The Party for Labour, Rule of Law, Animal Protection, Promotion of Elites and Grassroots Democratic Initiative (Die PARTEI)
- Party of Progress (PdF)
- Pirate Party Germany (PIRATEN)
- Sahra Wagenknecht Alliance – Reason and Justice (BSW)
- Team Freedom (TF)
- Tradesman's Party of Germany
- Volt Germany (Volt)
- WE LIVE DEMOCRACY (WLD)

== Campaign ==
Various election posters in Schwerin

=== AfD ===
At a party conference in Grimmen in May 2026, the AfD adopted its election program. In addition to internal security and a more repressive migration policy, the main topics include a more performance-oriented education policy and a change of course in energy policy. The AfD is calling for a special unit for border controls and repatriations within the state police, the establishment of a deportation detention facility and a strengthening of the police in terms of personnel and equipment, for example through stun guns. The age of criminal responsibility is to be reduced to 12 years. The AfD rejects wind power and ground-mounted photovoltaic systems and instead wants to put the Nord Stream pipelines back into operation, build gas-fired power plants and rely on nuclear power in the long term. The AfD also wants to withdraw from the national public broadcasting framework and tie state funding to strict political neutrality.

Numerous political scientists and constitutional lawyers warned before the election that some of the AfD's plans are unconstitutional.

=== CDU ===
In June 2026, the CDU election program was adopted at a party conference in Linstow. Core demands of the CDU include the promotion of digitization for companies, compensation for excessively high electricity costs, a construction child benefit and a trainee bonus, but also additional jobs at the public prosecutor's office and criminal investigation department and an expansion of video surveillance. Mandatory language level assessments before school enrollment, a clear name requirement in social media and a ban on gendering in schools and administration are also part of the programme. In its focus area of economy and jobs, the CDU wants to promote investment and the settlement of industrial companies.

=== Linke ===
Die Linke calls for an education package of 300 million euros for more staff and individual support. Die Linke calls to transform special schools into inclusive mainstream schools. The party wants to strengthen municipal and cooperative housing companies and support a nationwide rent cap. Through free local transport for everyone under the age of 21, the party promises more social participation. For care, Die Linke calls for a state fund for additional subsidies. Furthermore, Die Linke is in favor of abolishing the debt brake in the Basic Law, May 8 as a public holiday, easier referendums and supporting municipalities in providing housing for refugees.

=== BSW ===
Demand from the BSW election campaign: Gas supplies from Russia via Nord Stream

The party advocates a peace policy through disarmament and a rejection of the NATO headquarters in Rostock. The BSW wants to obtain Russian gas again via Nord Stream and is calling for larger shelters for villages and communities at wind farms. In addition, the BSW is in favour of strengthening collective bargaining coverage and a minimum wage of at least 15 euros. In the state parliament, the BSW wants to set up a committee of inquiry to review the Corona policy. For the government, the BSW calls for a non-partisan prime minister who should work with all parties.

=== Debate invitation controversies ===
In June, the leaders of the four largest parties, both in parliament and in polls, – Schwesig (SPD), Holm (AfD), Peters (CDU) and Oldenburg (Left) – were invited to a TV debate in September, organized by RTL in cooperation with ntv and the private radio station Ostseewelle to take place shortly before the election. While Greens and FDP were represented in the parliament at the time, polls suggested they might (Greens) or would (FDP) fail to clear the 5% election threshold. On 11 August, Peters and Oldenburg (Left) were controversially disinvited by RTL, leaving the debate as a head-to-head duel between Schwesig and Holm. This led to anger from both the CDU and The Left. The debate was characterized as aggressive. aggressive.

== Opinion polls ==
=== Graphical summary ===
Local regression of polls conducted for 2026 Mecklenburg-Vorpommern state election

=== Party polling ===
Polling firm	Fieldwork date	Sample size	SPD	AfD	CDU	Linke	Grüne	FDP	BSW	Others	Lead
2026 state election	20 Sep 2026	–	35.5	38.2	4.9	6.5	5.7	1.0	4.8	3.4	2.7
Forschungsgruppe Wahlen	14–17 Sep 2026	1,395	37	36	6	9	5	–	4	3	1
INSA	8–15 Sep 2026	1,000	35	37	7	10	5	–	3	3	2
Forschungsgruppe Wahlen	7–10 Sep 2026	1,053	34	37	7	10	5	–	4	3	3
pollytix	8–9 Sep 2026	1,252	30	36	6	12	6	2	5	3	6
Infratest dimap	7–9 Sep 2026	1,565	33	38	7	9	5	–	4	4	5
INSA	1–8 Sep 2026	1,000	33	36	7	11	5	–	4	4	3
Infratest dimap	26–31 Aug 2026	1,215	32	35	8	11	5	–	4	5	3
Forsa	21–27 Aug 2026	1,047	28	37	10	11	5	–	4	5	9
Geostrategy	24–28 Aug 2026	1,000	26	38	9	14	4	3	4	2	12
INSA	4–11 Aug 2026	1,000	29	36	10	11	5	3	4	2	7
Infratest dimap	2–6 Jul 2026	1,167	29	36	9	12	5	–	4	5	7
INSA	11–18 Jun 2026	1,000	28	35	10	11	4	3	6	3	7
Infratest dimap	7–11 May 2026	1,153	27	36	10	13	4	–	5	5	9
INSA	6–16 Mar 2026	1,000	26	34	12	10	5	3	5	5	8
Forsa	9–16 Feb 2026	1,003	23	37	13	11	4	2	5	5	14
Forsa	9–16 Feb 2026	1,003	23	37	13	11	4	2	5	5	14
Infratest dimap	21–24 Jan 2026	1,145	25	35	13	12	4	–	6	5	10
Infratest dimap	18–23 Sep 2025	1,151	19	38	13	12	5	–	7	6	19
INSA	8–15 Apr 2025	1,000	21	29	17	15	5	–	6	7	8
Federal election	23 Feb 2025	–	12.4	35.0	16.0	12.0	5.4	3.2	10.6	3.6	19
Forsa	28 Jan–3 Feb 2025	1,004	21	29	16	8	7	3	9	7	8
Infratest dimap	20–25 Jan 2025	1,185	22	30	17	7	6	3	10	5	8
INSA	18–25 Nov 2024	1,000	21	27	19	5	5	–	16	5	6
Infratest dimap	23–28 Oct 2024	1,153	22	28	19	5	4	–	14	8	6
INSA	16–23 Sep 2024	1,000	20	25	21	4	5	2	17	6	4
European Parliament election	9 Jun 2024	–	10.3	28.3	21.5	4.9	4.8	2.6	16.4	11.2	6
INSA	27 May–3 Jun 2024	1,000	23	25	20	5	6	4	14	3	2
Infratest dimap	2–7 May 2024	1,177	21	26	21	5	8	–	10	9	5
Forsa	13 Apr–3 May 2024	1,005	20	25	19	6	7	3	14	6	5
Forsa	10–16 Jan 2024	1,002	21	31	18	8	8	3	5	6	10
Wahlkreisprognose	19–28 Oct 2023	1,020	20	35	17.5	8	6.5	4	–	9	15
Wahlkreisprognose	19–28 Oct 2023	1,020	20.5	25	15.5	3.5	4.5	3.5	21	6.5	4
Infratest dimap	13–16 Sep 2023	1,182	23	32	18	8	8	3	–	8	9
INSA	26 Jun–3 Jul 2023	1,000	27	29	18	10	6	4	–	6	2
INSA	3–11 Apr 2023	1,000	28	25	19	11	6	5	–	6	3
Forsa	18–23 Jan 2023	1,004	27	21	18	12	9	4	–	9	6
Infratest dimap	13–18 Oct 2022	1,168	28	24	17	11	8	4	–	8	4
Wahlkreisprognose	4–14 Aug 2022	1,000	27	24	15	8	13	5	–	8	3
Wahlkreisprognose	13–20 Jun 2022	1,041	33	19	17.5	7	11	4	–	8.5	14
Infratest dimap	1–4 Jun 2022	1,081	30	19	19	9	11	4	–	8	11
INSA	25–28 Apr 2022	1,018	35	18	16	11	6	6	–	8	17
Forsa	14–18 Mar 2022	1,001	34	16	16	12	7	5	–	10	18
Wahlkreisprognose	1–10 Feb 2022	1,000	30	18	20	8	10	6	–	8	10
INSA	31 Jan–7 Feb 2022	1,000	36	17	16	11	6	6	–	8	19
2021 state election	26 Sep 2021	–	39.6	16.7	13.3	9.9	6.3	5.8	–	8.4	22.9

== Results ==
Voter turnout was 78.1%. AfD won 22 of 36 constituencies and 10 seats from the party list, SPD won 14 constituencies and 15 list seats, thus there was no need for overhang seats, unlike in 2021. Of the four other parties that won seats in 2021, only The Left and the Greens remain represented, with 5 seats each. The CDU and FDP both lost representation, and the BSW did not pass 5% either.

Party	Constituency			Party list			Total seats	+/–
Party	Votes	%	Seats	Votes	%	Seats	Total seats	+/–
Alternative for Germany (AfD)	400,086	39.51	22	388,026	38.22	10	32	+18
Social Democratic Party (SPD)	378,532	37.38	14	360,393	35.50	15	29	–5
The Left (Linke)	78,886	7.79	0	66,388	6.54	5	5	–4
Alliance 90/The Greens (Grüne)	28,427	2.81	0	57,587	5.67	5	5	0
Christian Democratic Union (CDU)	63,212	6.24	0	49,629	4.89	0	0	–12
Sahra Wagenknecht Alliance (BSW)	40,497	4.00	0	49,036	4.83	0	0	New
Human Environment Animal Protection Party (Tierschutzpartei)				11,131	1.10	0	0	0
Free Democratic Party (FDP)	15,441	1.52	0	10,415	1.03	0	0	–5
Tradesman's Party of Germany				4,798	0.47	0	0	New
Free Voters (FW)	2,199	0.22	0	3,823	0.38	0	0	0
The PARTY (PARTEI)	446	0.04	0	2,760	0.27	0	0	0
Team Freedom (TF)	653	0.06	0	2,545	0.25	0	0	New
Pirate Party Germany (Piraten)				2,003	0.20	0	0	0
Volt	715	0.07	0	1,909	0.19	0	0	New
We Live Democracy (WLD)	591	0.06	0	1,249	0.12	0	0	New
Ecological Democratic Party (ÖDP)				981	0.10	0	0	0
Party of Progress (PdF)				940	0.09	0	0	New
Alliance C – Christians for Germany (Bündnis C)				892	0.09	0	0	0
Communist Party of Germany (KPD)				818	0.08	0	0	0
Lobbyists for Children (LfK)	99	0.01	0				0	New
Independents	2,880	0.28	0				0	0
Total	1,012,664	100.00	36	1,015,323	100.00	35	71	–8
Valid votes	1,012,664	98.87		1,015,323	99.13			
Invalid/blank votes	11,587	1.13		8,928	0.87			
Total votes	1,024,251	100.00		1,024,251	100.00			
Registered voters/turnout	1,311,294	78.11		1,311,294	78.11			
Source: State Returning Officer

Popular vote
AfD	38.22%
SPD	35.50%
LINKE	6.54%
GRÜNE	5.67%
CDU	4.89%
BSW	4.83%
TIERSCHUTZ	1.10%
FDP	1.03%
Other	2.22%

Landtag seats
AfD	45.07%
SPD	40.85%
LINKE	7.04%
GRÜNE	7.04%

=== Results by constituency ===
No.	Constituency	Turnout	Winner				Runner-up				Margin
No.	Constituency	%	Candidate	Party	Votes	%	Candidate	Party	Votes	%	Margin
1	Greifswald	76.8	Christian Pegel	SPD	13,728	39.35	Kevin Kurtze	AfD	10,165	29.14	3,563
2	Neubrandenburg I	72.9	Stephan Scheel	AfD	6,921	37.89	Vanessa Freund	SPD	6,862	37.57	59
3	Neubrandenburg II	76.1	Erik von Malottki	SPD	7,318	39.61	Robert Schnell	AfD	6,929	37.50	389
4	Hansestadt Rostock I	74.1	Ralf Mucha	SPD	10,063	38.48	Michael Meister	AfD	9,263	35.42	800
5	Hansestadt Rostock II	72.5	Lennart Harms	SPD	10,412	40.42	Helmut Schulz	AfD	7,928	30.78	2,484
6	Hansestadt Rostock III	83.8	Julian Barlen	SPD	15,429	42.20	Nurgül Senli	Left	8,646	23.65	6,783
7	Hansestadt Rostock IV	79.4	Sandra Wandt	SPD	15,798	38.96	Sascha Gläser	AfD	10,411	25.68	5,387
8	Schwerin I	80.7	Manuela Schwesig	SPD	21,368	54.36	Leif-Erik Holm	AfD	11,066	28.15	10,302
9	Schwerin II	73.5	Mandy Pfeifer	SPD	8,579	43.21	Petra Federau	AfD	7,306	36.79	1,273
10	Wismar	74.9	Tilo Gundlack	SPD	11,573	46.24	Manuela Medrow	AfD	8,357	33.39	3,216
11	Landkreis Rostock I	81.8	Stefanie Drese	SPD	15,124	41.19	Thomas de Jesus Fernandes	AfD	13,129	35.76	1,995
12	Landkreis Rostock II	84.8	Dirk Stamer	SPD	17,182	40.73	Hans-Werner Moltzen	AfD	14,656	34.74	2,526
13	Mecklenburgische Seenplatte I - Vorpommern-Greifswald I	75.0	Enrico Schult	AfD	11,555	54.15	Anna-Konstanze Schröder	SPD	5,855	27.44	5,700
14	Mecklenburgische Seenplatte II	77.9	Christian Skotnik	AfD	10,909	47.34	Thomas Krüger	SPD	7,345	31.87	3,564
15	Landkreis Rostock III	80.0	Steffi Burmeister	AfD	14,386	45.94	Grit Schmelzer	SPD	10,450	33.37	3,936
16	Landkreis Rostock IV	75.7	Peter Reizlein	AfD	14,071	41.98	Philipp da Cunha	SPD	12,901	38.49	1,170
17	Ludwigslust-Parchim I	78.7	Till Backhaus	SPD	11,228	43.87	Nicole Ehlers	AfD	10,085	39.40	1,143
18	Ludwigslust-Parchim II	80.5	Martin Schmidt	AfD	10,783	41.26	Markus Eichwitz	SPD	10,152	38.85	631
19	Ludwigslust-Parchim III	80.0	Alexander Tschich	AfD	10,823	44.47	Christian Winter	SPD	8,738	35.9	2,085
20	Mecklenburgische Seenplatte III	78.0	Frank Müller	AfD	15,378	43.34	Nadine Julitz	SPD	12,936	36.46	2,442
21	Mecklenburgische Seenplatte IV	78.9	Sarah Hoge	AfD	10,696	40.66	Diana Goede	SPD	10,259	39.00	437
22	Mecklenburgische Seenplatte V	81.2	Jan Michael Martin	AfD	13,431	50.62	Thomas Herrholz	SPD	8,130	30.64	5,301
23	Vorpommern-Rügen I	78.1	Jan Steinfurth	AfD	10,922	40.58	Michel-Friedrich Schiefler	SPD	9,494	35.28	1,428
24	Vorpommern-Rügen II - Stralsund III	77.1	Carlos Dias Rodrigues	AfD	10,079	47.59	Monique Wölk	SPD	5,995	28.31	4,084
25	Vorpommern-Rügen III - Stralsund I	75.8	Sandra Graf	AfD	14,048	45.13	Thomas Würdisch	SPD	10,167	32.66	3,881
26	Stralsund II	75.1	Beatrix Hegenkötter	SPD	7,394	35.44	Michael Kasch	AfD	7,288	34.93	106
27	Nordwestmecklenburg I	79.3	Birgit Hesse	SPD	14,485	38.64	Jannik Schreiber	AfD	14,009	37.37	476
28	Nordwestmecklenburg II	81.2	Paul-Joachim Timm	AfD	16,199	41.60	Jens Strohschein	SPD	13,682	35.14	2,517
29	Vorpommern-Greifswald II	77.2	Jens Schulze-Wiehenbrauk	AfD	13,579	48.92	Marcel Falk	SPD	9,271	33.40	4,308
30	Vorpommern-Greifswald III	77.5	Stephan Johannes Reuken	AfD	17,716	50.40	Falko Beitz	SPD	10,934	31.11	6,782
31	Ludwigslust-Parchim IV	76.9	Thore Stein	AfD	12,436	44.25	Christian Brade	SPD	9,496	33.79	2,940
32	Ludwigslust-Parchim V	81.8	Jan-Phillip Tadsen	AfD	12,350	41.80	Christine Klingohr	SPD	10,703	36.23	1,647
33	Vorpommern-Rügen IV	76.4	Tommy Thormann	AfD	8,484	44.26	Heiko Miraß	SPD	5,985	31.22	2,499
34	Vorpommern-Rügen V	75.1	Thomas Naulin	AfD	8,669	41.57	Sylva Rahm-Präger	SPD	6,863	32.91	1,806
35	Vorpommern-Greifswald IV	74.9	Inken Arndt	AfD	10,347	51.61	Patrick Dahlemann	SPD	6,777	33.81	3,570
36	Vorpommern-Greifswald V	74.5	Nikolaus Kramer	AfD	9,317	51.22	Bettina Martin	SPD	5,856	32.20	3,461

=== Electorate ===
The electorate statistics, based on post-election surveys conducted by Infratest dimap, are as follows. (Note: Figures for "Other" are calculated as the remainder after the parties individually reported by Infratest dimap and may therefore be affected by rounding.)

Demographic	SPD	AfD	CDU	Linke	Grüne	FDP	BSW	Other
Total vote	35.5%	38.2%	4.9%	6.5%	5.7%	1.0%	4.8%	3.3%
Sex
Men	30%	44%	5%	6%	6%	1%	4%	4%
Women	40%	33%	4%	7%	6%	1%	6%	3%
Age
18–24 years old	22%	36%	2%	21%	7%	2%	5%	5%
25–34 years old	24%	32%	3%	17%	10%	1%	6%	7%
35–44 years old	28%	46%	2%	6%	8%	1%	5%	4%
45–59 years old	29%	47%	5%	4%	6%	1%	5%	3%
60–69 years old	37%	41%	6%	3%	4%	1%	5%	3%
70+ years old	52%	26%	7%	4%	4%	1%	5%	1%
Employment status
Workers	27%	52%	2%	6%	2%	1%	4%	6%
Employees	29%	43%	4%	8%	6%	1%	5%	4%
Pensioners	48%	31%	6%	5%	4%	1%	4%	1%
Self-employed	19%	47%	11%	3%	10%	2%	4%	4%
Education
Lower secondary education	35%	46%	5%	4%	2%	1%	3%	4%
Higher secondary education	33%	47%	3%	5%	2%	1%	5%	4%
University degree	37%	25%	6%	9%	12%	1%	5%	5%
Personal economic situation
Good	41%	31%	6%	6%	7%	1%	5%	3%
Bad	18%	60%	2%	7%	2%	1%	6%	4%

== Aftermath ==
Although the AfD gained a plurality of seats in the new Landtag, they were subject to a firewall policy, with all other parties refusing to work with them. Schwesig invited both the Greens and the Left to exploratory talks in anticipation of forming a coalition government. When it became apparent that the red-red-green alliance was the only coalition that could obtain a majority without working with the AfD, it was anticipated that Schwesig would continue to lead Mecklenburg-Vorpommen.

After two weeks of exploratory talks, the three parties announced they were successful and would progress to formal coalition negotiations on 9 October. The opening session of the Landtag was on 20 October. The state constitution allows four weeks from that date for the election of a Minister-President, setting a 17 November deadline for the completion of negotiations, approval by party conventions, and a vote in the Landtag.

At the opening session, the SPD's Birgit Hesse was re-elected as President of the Landtag, with Oldenburg elected as the first Vice-President and the Greens' Maya Tischler as second Vice-President. The AfD placed Carlos Rodrigues as its candidate on all three ballots and he was voted down each time.

On 10 November, the SPD, The Left, and The Greens announced they had reached a coalition agreement. Schwesig was re-elected as Minister-President on 16 November by a vote of 39 to 29.
