= 1998 Mecklenburg-Vorpommern state election =

German state election

- 27 September 1998

All 71 seats in the Landtag of Mecklenburg-Vorpommern 36 seats needed for a majority
- Turnout: 1,084,611 (79.4%) ▲6.5%
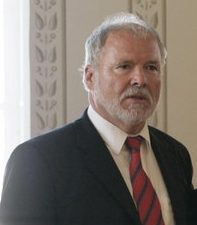

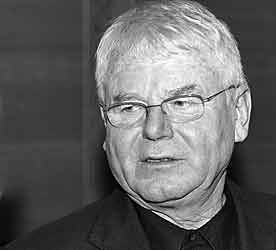

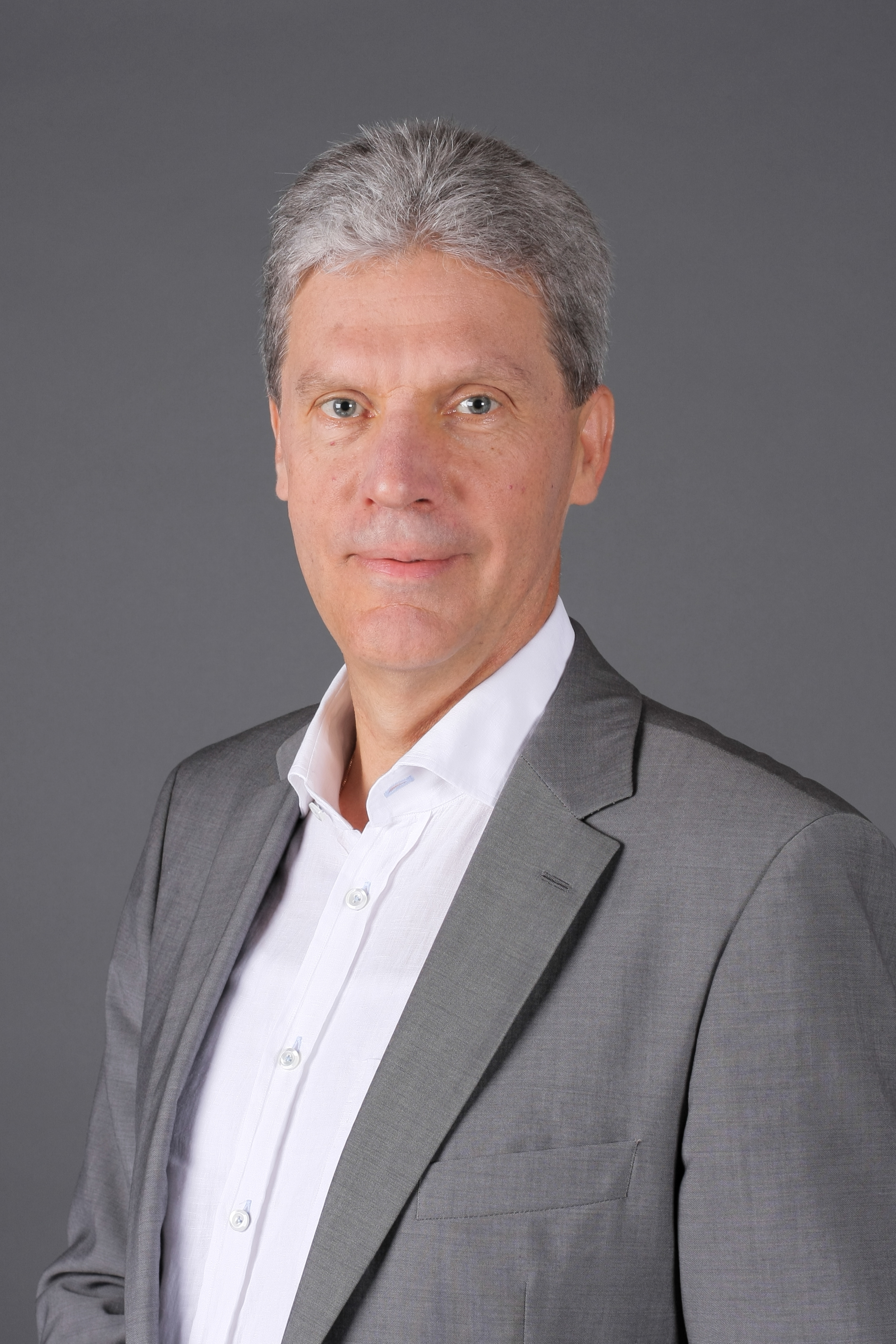
	First party	Second party	Third party
Leader	Harald Ringstorff	Berndt Seite	Helmut Holter
Party	SPD	CDU	PDS
Last election	23 seats, 29.5%	30 seats, 37.7%	18 seats, 22.7%
Seats won	27	24	20
Seat change	▲4	▼6	▲2
Popular vote	371,885	327,948	264,299
Percentage	34.3%	30.2%	24.4%
Swing	▲4.8%	▼7.5%	▲1.7%
- Results for the single-member constituencies
Minister-President before election
Berndt Seite
CDU
Elected Minister-President
Harald Ringstorff
SPD

The 1998 Mecklenburg-Vorpommern state election to elect the members of the 3rd Landtag of Mecklenburg-Vorpommern was held on 27 September 1998 in connection with the 1998 German federal election which resulted in a record high voter turnout.

The incumbent government was a grand coalition of the Christian Democratic Union (CDU) and Social Democratic Party (SPD) led by Minister-President Berndt Seite. As on federal level, the SPD overtook the CDU as the largest party, and chose not to continue the grand coalition. They subsequently formed a coalition with the Party of Democratic Socialism (PDS), the re-named party that as SED had ruled former East Germany. This Red–red coalition was the first of its kind in Germany on the state level, and SPD leader Harald Ringstorff was elected Minister-President.

The SPD remained the largest political party in Mecklenburg-Vorpommern state elections until dropping to second in the 2026 Mecklenburg-Vorpommern state election to the Alternative for Germany (AfD).

== Parties ==
The table below lists parties represented in the 2nd Landtag of Mecklenburg-Vorpommern.

Name		Ideology	Leader(s)	1994 result	
Name		Ideology	Leader(s)	Votes (%)	Seats
CDU	Christian Democratic Union of Germany; Christlich Demokratische Union Deutschlands	Christian democracy	Berndt Seite	37.7%	30 / 71
SPD	Social Democratic Party of Germany; Sozialdemokratische Partei Deutschlands	Social democracy	Harald Ringstorff	29.5%	23 / 71
PDS	Party of Democratic Socialism; Partei des Demokratischen Sozialismus	Democratic socialism	Helmut Holter	22.7%	18 / 71

== Opinion polling ==
Polling firm	Fieldwork date	Sample size	CDU	SPD	PDS	FDP	Grüne	Others	Lead
1998 state election	27 Sep 1998	–	30.2	34.3	24.4	1.6	2.7	6.9	4.1
Infratest dimap	7–13 Sep 1998	1,000	30	38	22	2	3	5	8
Infratest dimap	26 Aug 1998	?	28	41	20	2	4	5	13
Emnid	8 Aug 1998	?	28	39	20	2	4	8	11
Infratest dimap	21 Jul 1998	?	26	39	23	2	4	6	13
Infratest dimap	9 Feb–29 Mar 1998	904	28	43	19	2	5	3	15
1994 state election	16 Oct 1994	–	37.7	29.5	22.7	3.8	3.7	2.6	8.2

== Election result ==
Summary of the 27 September 1998 election results for the Landtag of Mecklenburg-Vorpommern
Party	Votes	%	+/-	Seats	+/-	Seats %
Social Democratic Party (SPD)	371,885	34.3	▲4.8	27	▲4	38.0
Christian Democratic Union (CDU)	327,948	30.2	▼7.5	24	▼6	33.8
Party of Democratic Socialism (PDS)	264,299	24.4	▲1.7	20	▲2	28.2
German People's Union (DVU)	31,194	2.9	▲2.9	0	±0	0
Alliance 90/The Greens (Grüne)	29,240	2.7	▼1.0	0	±0	0
Free Democratic Party (FDP)	17,062	1.6	▼2.2	0	±0	0
Pro DM	15,619	1.4	New	0	New	0
National Democratic Party of Germany (NPD)	11,531	1.1	▲1.0	0	±0	0
Others	5,809	1.5		0	±0	0
Total	1,084,511	100.0		71	▲5	
Voter turnout		79.4	▲6.5			

Popular Vote
SPD	34.29%
CDU	30.24%
PDS	24.37%
DVU	2.88%
B'90/GRÜNE	2.70%
FDP	1.57%
Other	3.96%

Landtag seats
SPD	38.03%
CDU	33.80%
PDS	28.17%

== Sources ==
- Wahl zum Landtag von Mecklenburg-Vorpommern
