= Alfred Gomolka =

German politician (1942–2020)

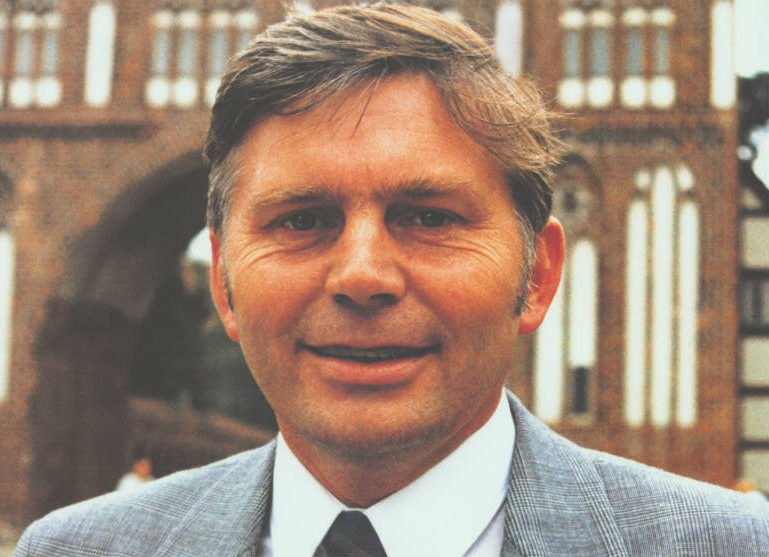
- Gomolka in 1990

Minister-President of Mecklenburg-Vorpommern
- In office 27 October 1990 – 19 March 1992
- Deputy: Klaus Gollert
- Preceded by: Martin Brick (as Landesbevollmächtigter)
- Succeeded by: Berndt Seite
Parliamentary constituencies
Member of the European Parliament for Germany
In office 19 July 1994 – 13 July 2009
Preceded by	multi-member district
Succeeded by	multi-member district
Member of the Landtag of Mecklenburg-Vorpommern for Greifswald
In office 26 October 1990 – 15 November 1994
Preceded by	Constituency established
Succeeded by	Hans-Jürgen Zobel
Member of the Volkskammer for Rostock
In office 5 April 1990 – 2 October 1990
Preceded by	Constituency established
Succeeded by	Constituency abolished

President of the Bundesrat
- In office 1 November 1991 – 19 March 1992
- Preceded by: Björn Engholm
- Succeeded by: Berndt Seite

Personal details
- Born: 21 July 1942 Breslau, Province of Lower Silesia, Free State of Prussia, Nazi Germany (now Wrocław, Poland)
- Died: 24 March 2020 (aged 77) Loitz, Mecklenburg-Vorpommern, Germany
- Party: Christian Democratic Union (1990–2020)
- Other political affiliations: Christian Democratic Union (East) (1960–1968; 1971–1990)
- Children: 4
- Education: University of Greifswald
- Occupation: Politician; Geographer; Teacher

Alfred Gomolka (21 July 1942 – 24 March 2020) was a German politician and member of the European Parliament for Mecklenburg-Vorpommern. He also served as the minister president of Mecklenburg-Vorpommern.

== Personal life and death ==
Gomolka was born in Breslau, Germany (now Wrocław, Poland). He had a PhD in geography. He was married and had four children. At one point, Gomolka attempted to set up a new radio station. However, he was unable to compete with Norddeutscher Rundfunk.

Gomolka died on 24 March 2020, aged 77.

== Career ==
Gomolka was a member of the conservative Christian Democratic Union of Germany (CDU). He joined the CDU at a young age, though he was at times unhappy with the party's alliance with the Socialist Unity Party of Germany (SED). He served on the Greifswald City Council when the area was part of East Germany.

Following German reunification, he served as the first minister president (Note: Some sources say Prime Minister) of Mecklenburg-Vorpommern from October 1990 until 1992. In 1990, the CDU took 33 of the 66 seats in the Mecklenburg-Vorpommern state parliament, but was aided by one person transferring from the SED to the CDU and two MPs from the Free Democratic Party (FDP). In 1992, Gomolka was involved in the shipyard crisis, a disagreement between Gomolka and the German Minister for Transport and CDU regional party leader Günther Krause over shipyard policies. Gomolka had wanted to rebuild and then privatise German shipbuilding, whereas Krause wanted to immediately sell the shipyards. They also disagreed on how many ships to sell to Bremer Vulkan. Krause accused Gomolka of incompetence over his handling of the crisis. Krause then overturned Gomolka's shipyard policies. As a result of the crisis, the CDU lost trust in Gomolka, and he left his role as minister president of Mecklenburg-Vorpommern. He remained as a state MP until 1994 and was replaced by Berndt Seite as minister president. From November 1991 until March 1992, Gomolka also served as the president of the German Bundesrat, before being replaced by Berndt Seite.

From 1994 until 2009, Gomolka was an MEP, representing the CDU. He focused upon improving relations with the Baltic states, and was an advocate for Latvia's entry into the European Union. He served as the chairman of the EU delegation to the EU-Latvia Joint Parliamentary Committee. After leaving the EU Parliament, he served as leader of the CDU Seniors' Union for northeast Germany until 2015.
