= Kleedehn =

Kleedehn is a surname. Notable people with the surname include:

- Bärbel Kleedehn (1952–2022), German politician
- William Kleedehn, dog-sledder, competitor from 1999 to 2009 in Yukon Quest
