= Bärbel Kleedehn =

German politician (1952–2022)

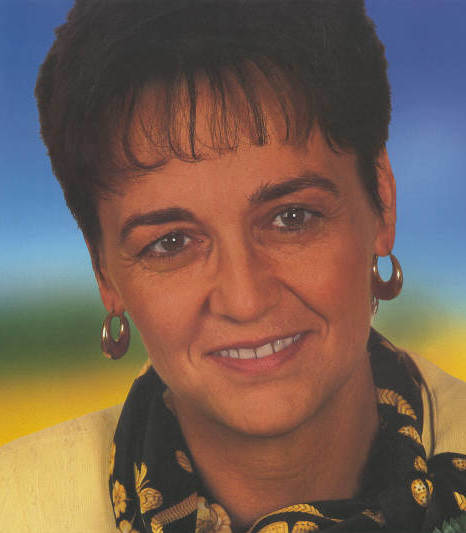
Kleedehn in 1968

Bärbel Nehring-Kleedehn or Bärbel Kleedehn (29 July 1952 – 28 April 2022) was a German politician from the CDU party.

== Early life and education ==
Kleedehn was born on 29 July 1952 in Schwerin in Mecklenburg-Vorpommern. She studied chemistry, French and Russian at the University of Greifswald and has a diploma in economics from the Handelshochschule Leipzig.

== Career ==
She was elected as a member of the Landtag of Mecklenburg-Vorpommern, the state parliament, in the 1994 state election. She was the Finance Minister of the state of Mecklenburg-Vorpommern from 1990 to 1996, and Minister for Construction, Regional Development and the Environment of the same state from 1996 to 1998.

After leaving politics she was president of the Mecklenburg-Vorpommern section of the German Red Cross (DRK: Deutsches Rotes Kreuz) from 1998 to 2002.

== Personal life ==
She was married with three children, and died on 28 April 2022.
