= 2026 German government crisis =

Political crisis surrounding German chancellor Friedrich Merz

- German chancellor Friedrich Merz in 2026
- Native name: Kanzlerkrise 2026
- Date: 14 July 2026 – present
- Location: Germany
- Also known as: Kanzlerdämmerung
- Type: Political crisis
- Participants: Friedrich Merz; CDU/CSU; SPD; AfD

The 2026 German government crisis (in German-language reporting Kanzlerkrise or Kanzlerdämmerung, lit. 'chancellor crisis') is a political crisis surrounding German chancellor Friedrich Merz, his Christian Democratic Union (CDU), and the grand coalition of the CDU/CSU (Union) parties and the Social Democratic Party of Germany (SPD) that took office in May 2025.

In July 2026, a personnel scandal involving Union parliamentary leader Jens Spahn and a poorly received cabinet reshuffle produced the first open talk of replacing Merz only 14 months into his chancellorship. The second and more severe phase followed the 2026 Saxony-Anhalt state election on 6 September, in which the far-right Alternative for Germany (AfD) won 43.8% of the party-list vote—the strongest result for any party in the state since German reunification—while the CDU fell to 17.2%, its worst result there since the state was reconstituted, and lost every constituency seat.

By September 2026, Merz's personal approval ratings had reached historic lows. An INSA survey for Bild found that 14% of respondents regarded him as the right chancellor and 78% did not, including a majority of Union voters. National polls placed the AfD first, at around 28–29%, with the Union near 20%. Commentators and some CDU officials discussed a Kanzlertausch (chancellor swap) in favour of North Rhine-Westphalia minister-president Hendrik Wüst or Bavarian minister-president Markus Söder, a possible minority government, or the collapse of the coalition.

The 20 September state elections in Berlin and in Mecklenburg-Vorpommern saw more losses for the CDU, a situation that Merz described as a "disaster". In Mecklenburg-Vorpommern, support for the CDU dropped from an already weak 13% (in 2021) to under the electoral threshold of 5%, meaning the party will not enter the Landtag for the first time since the reunification of Germany. Merz nonetheless vowed to remain chancellor and party leader.

== Background ==
=== Formation of the Merz cabinet ===
The 2025 German federal election on 23 February 2025, called after the collapse of the Scholz cabinet in the 2024 German government crisis, returned the CDU/CSU as the largest group with 28.5 per cent of the vote and 208 of 630 Bundestag seats. The AfD finished second with 20.8 per cent and 152 seats, its best federal result to that date. The SPD fell to 16.4 per cent and 120 seats.

Opinion polling for the next German federal election shows CDU/CSU getting passed by AfD in September 2025, and declining steeply since April 2026.

Because the Union and the SPD together held 328 seats—a narrow majority of 12—and because all mainstream parties maintained a Brandmauer ("firewall") against coalition with the AfD, the two sides negotiated a fifth postwar black–red coalition. The agreement was signed on 5 May 2025. On 6 May Merz failed on the first Bundestag ballot, receiving 310 votes against the 316 required for an absolute majority, an unprecedented first-round defeat for a designated chancellor. He was elected on the second ballot the same day with 325 votes and appointed by President Frank-Walter Steinmeier. Lars Klingbeil of the SPD became vice-chancellor. Merz entered office promising a Wirtschaftswende ("economic turnaround") from Germany's economic crisis, and said he intended to reduce support for the AfD. Sixteen months later the AfD led national polls and the governing parties' combined support had fallen well below their 2025 election share.

=== Student strikes against military conscription ===
Following a controversial decision by the Bundestag in December 2025, school strikes ensued across hundreds of German cities to protest a possible reintroduction of compulsory military service.

=== Reform agenda ===
A coalition committee meeting on 1–2 July 2026 endorsed a package intended to stabilise social-insurance systems and revive growth. It included implementation of the 33 recommendations of a government pensions commission (raising the statutory retirement age in line with life expectancy beyond 67 for cohorts born from 1965, curbing early-retirement incentives, and introducing a funded component), healthcare changes, abolition of telephone sick notes, and an income tax reform including a higher top rate. Merz claimed that the measures had to be legislated by the end of 2026. The package was unpopular with large parts of the electorate and, after the Saxony-Anhalt defeat, with sections of the SPD, which called for the pension, care and 2027-budget plans to be reopened.

A survey commissioned by the German Civil Servants' Union (dbb) and conducted by the Forsa institute in the first half of 2026 found that a substantial share of German citizens believe the government has failed to manage problems and fulfill its duties. Public trust in the government's performance has fallen to its lowest level in recent years. According to the survey, 79 percent of respondents believe the German government is overwhelmed by the volume of its responsibilities and crises and lacks the capacity to fulfill its duties effectively. Only 17 percent of citizens expressed trust in the government—a figure that has declined steadily from 23, 25, and 27 percent in previous years.

Volker Geyer, president of the German Civil Service Federation, described the survey results as "catastrophic" and a serious warning to the government, calling the loss of trust a danger to democracy. He called on the government to pursue reforms with a tangible impact on citizens' lives. Such reforms, he said, should aim to stimulate economic growth, strengthen social security systems, and improve the efficiency of government agencies in order to rebuild public trust.

== Crisis ==
=== Spahn surrogacy controversy ===
On 14 July 2026, Bild reported that Jens Spahn (leader of the CDU/CSU Bundestag group since May 2025) and his husband had become parents through a surrogate in the United States. Commercial surrogacy is prohibited in Germany and had long been opposed by the CDU, including by Spahn himself. The disclosure produced a conservative backlash inside the Union. Spahn resigned as parliamentary leader on 18 July 2026.

=== Cabinet reshuffle ===
Merz used the vacancy to rearrange party and government posts. On 29 July President Steinmeier appointed:

- Nina Warken (previously health minister) as head of the Federal Chancellery, succeeding Thorsten Frei;
- Carsten Linnemann (previously CDU secretary-general) as federal health minister;
- Steffen Bilger as federal transport minister, succeeding Patrick Schnieder.

The transport minister appointment was chaotic: Merz informed Schnieder of his intended dismissal while Schnieder was on holiday; the first designated successor, Fritz Güntzler, accepted and then withdrew; Schnieder then asked to be dismissed to end what he called an "undignified situation". Health state secretary Tino Sorge publicly criticised Merz for announcing Sorge's removal to party bodies and the press before speaking to him. The new ministers were not sworn in by the Bundestag until after the summer recess. On same day, the Union parliamentary group elected Thorsten Frei as Spahn's successor by 170 votes of 185 members present (91.9 per cent). Franziska Hoppermann succeeded Linnemann as CDU secretary-general. Politico described the combined Spahn and reshuffle affairs as "the gravest crisis of [Merz's] chancellorship" to that point and reported that replacement of the chancellor was no longer taboo in private conversation among Union legislators, though most officials postponed any move until after the September state elections.

=== Poor state election performance ===
==== Saxony-Anhalt ====
Saxony-Anhalt state elections: largest party in each constituency

2021

2026

The state election in Saxony-Anhalt on 6 September 2026 was widely treated as the first electoral test of the Merz government in eastern Germany, where the AfD had already become the strongest party in several 2024 contests. In the election, the AfD won 38 of 41 constituencies; The Left won the other three. The CDU, which had won 40 of 41 constituencies in 2021 and had led every state government in Saxony-Anhalt since 2002, won no constituencies. An exit poll indicated that only about 9 per cent of Saxony-Anhalt voters approved of Merz's performance as chancellor.

In the aftermath, Minister-President Sven Schulze (CDU) conceded that his party no longer had a mandate to govern and announced that he would not seek re-election as state party leader; he later won a contest for the CDU Landtag group leadership. AfD lead candidate Ulrich Siegmund said he would stand for minister-president if he could assemble a stable majority and ruled out a minority cabinet. The BSW said it would support neither Siegmund nor Schulze; its federal leader Amira Mohamed Ali floated a non-partisan minister-president governing with shifting majorities.

At a press conference in Berlin on 7 September, Merz called the Saxony-Anhalt result "the worst election defeat the CDU has suffered in years—or even decades" and said the party had been shaken "to its very foundations". He acknowledged that "my persona, too, has been a recurring topic in this election campaign", promised to communicate reforms more clearly, and insisted that "giving up is not an option" and that the reform course would continue.

Merz faced renewed controversy and pressure, including from the SPD, over the CDU's position towards the AfD, which had just won its first key state post due to the election of AfD politician Tobias Rausch as president of the Saxony-Anhalt Landtag: Rausch received 48 votes, four more than the combined AfD and BSW total, and media analysis, as well as Rausch himself, suggested that four CDU members had voted for him. The controversy prompted a rare intervention from former Chancellor Angela Merkel. In a mid-October 2026 interview with Hessischer Rundfunk, Merkel drew a sharp distinction between The Left and the AfD regarding their adherence to the German Constitution. While she noted that she could not share the views of certain members of The Left, "particularly when it comes to antisemitism", she stated that their views were "by and large, not contrary to our constitution", adding that she would have been open to a compromise with The Left while maintaining that mainstream parties should not cooperate with the AfD.

==== Mecklenburg-Vorpommern ====
Mecklenburg-Vorpommern state elections: largest party in each constituency

2021

2026

The state election in Mecklenburg-Vorpommern held on 20 September 2026 was treated as the next electoral test of the Merz government after the elections in Saxony-Anhalt. In this election, the CDU suffered the worst election result since its founding, missing the 5% voter threshold and losing all their seats in the Landtag. As the first projections arrived, Merz convened the CDU presidium in Berlin, calling the result a "disaster" that could not be "sugar-coated", but that he would remain party chairman and chancellor and continue the reform programme. CDU secretary-general Franziska Hoppermann described the mood in the presidium as "very tense and very serious". In an post-election interview with ZDF, AfD chairwoman Alice Weidel claimed the status of Volkspartei for the AfD and also claimed that her party was replacing the CDU.

==== Berlin ====
Berlin state elections: largest party in each constituency

2021

2026

The CDU had governed Berlin with the SPD since 2023; governing mayor Kai Wegner did not stand as lead candidate. Instead, finance senator Stefan Evers headed the CDU list. The Left, led by Elif Eralp, finished first with 25.7%, ahead of the CDU on 18.8%. The incumbent CDU–SPD city coalition lost its majority. Possible majorities include Left–Green–SPD or CDU–Green–SPD. On 7 October, Merz called on the SPD and Greens to "live up to their responsibilities" and use their negative majority to prevent a Left-led government in Berlin by joining the CDU, even as his party allegedly—as the ballot was secret—helped the AfD to win its first key state post in Saxony-Anhalt. Merz's appeal came as The Left, SPD, and Greens were still engaged in talks over forming a government.

=== Federal escalation ===
==== Coalition rift ====
SPD leaders, including secretary-general Tim Klüssendorf, demanded talks on softening pension and care reforms, revisiting the 2027 federal budget, and reopening debate on inheritance and wealth taxation. Merz spoke by telephone on 8 September with Klingbeil and labour minister Bärbel Bas. Analysts said the dispute could delay or derail the July package. Some Union legislators, including Christian von Stetten of the parliamentary Mittelstand circle, urged Merz to dismiss Bas for blocking reforms—a step that would have broken the coalition. A critical group of Union MPs was reported to be unwilling to vote for the 2027 budget in its existing form.

Following the results of the September state elections, SPD leaders, including Klingbeil and Bas, announced their intent to "revise" the planned reforms, while remaining committed to the coalition with the Union. Klingbeil argued: "If the citizens of our country perceive reforms as a threat to their lives that leads only to a worsening of their situation, then it is not just our communication that needs to improve, but, in some instances, the substance of the reform itself." Accordingly, SPD re-opened negotiations and threatened to block the reforms.

On 12 October 2026, Bas resigned as Labor Minister and as co-leader of the SPD, citing a personal bereavement and continued "open attacks" against her from within the coalition of the SPD and Chancellor Friedrich Merz's conservative bloc of the CDU/CSU. Klingbeil denounced the "outrageous" attacks his colleague had been subjected to in a time of mourning and warned that tension in the coalition provided fuel for the far-right. He canceled a planned trip to India to deal with the upheaval within his party and finding a replacement for the co-lead, suggesting elections at a SPD party gathering in December or January.

==== Merz's response ====
During the 2027-budget debate on 9 September, Merz accused the AfD of advancing Russian interests and said its "remigration" programme was "nothing other than a synonym for ethnic cleansing based on origin and skin colour". AfD co-leader Alice Weidel told the chamber that Merz's "time was up". AfD chief whip Bernd Baumann replied that remigration meant only the lawful deportation of people with no right to remain. The AfD later said it would file a criminal complaint against Merz for defamatory insult.

On the same day, Merz postponed a scheduled telephone call with United States president Donald Trump, planned around the 25th anniversary of the September 11 attacks. Trump had written on Truth Social that "the Populist Party in Germany just had a really big night" because voters were "tired of the absolutely horrible Immigration rules", signing off "MGGA". A government spokesman declined to give a reason but recalled Merz's objection to foreign commentary on German elections.

On 15 September, Merz cancelled a planned trip to the United Nations General Assembly in New York, where he had been scheduled to address the Assembly and receive the American Academy in Berlin's Henry A. Kissinger Prize; the Chancellery said his "presence [was] required in Berlin". Foreign minister Johann Wadephul spoke in his place.

On 4 October, Merz made an unannounced visit with Economy Minister Katherina Reiche (CDU) to Kyiv, Ukraine. He pledged a further €1 billion in military aid for the Russo-Ukrainian war, €350 million for Ukraine's energy sector, and announced financing for interceptor drones. In a joint press conference with Ukraine President Volodymyr Zelenskyy, Merz directly addressed the possibility of a collapse of the German government, which he deemed would have "immeasurable consequences for all of Europe" and tied that to getting the reform package through. He also cited President Steinmeier’s 3 October Unity Day speech, which warned against further gains by extremist forces, as a rebuke to both an AfD-led government in Saxony-Anhalt and a Left-led one in Berlin.

On October 13, Merz re-stated his ambition to get the reforms through by the end of the year during his commencement speech for German Employer's Day, clarifying "I have no intention of becoming the nation's darling".

=== Party-management disputes ===
==== CDU ====
Deputy CDU secretary-general Christina Stumpp publicly denied mid-week reports that Merz had asked her to resign. After several days of resistance she and Merz issued a joint statement on 11 September that she would leave office on 21 September, the day after the Berlin and Mecklenburg-Vorpommern elections; Merz proposed Thuringian MP Michael Hose as acting successor. German media treated the episode as evidence of eroded chancellor authority inside the CDU.

Mecklenburg-Vorpommern CDU deputy chairman Tino Schomann said the election had shown Merz "cannot do it" and was "unsuitable" for an office that required unifying the country. Young Union official Clara von Nathusius said on ARD that "with this chancellor, elections can no longer be won" and later clarified that Merz should not stand again. Union deputy parliamentary leader Mathias Middelberg said he still believed in Merz but that reforms had to be implemented faster.

On 16 September, the eight incumbent CDU minister-presidents issued a joint statement arguing that restoring trust required "listening and taking political action, not debates over personnel", and that they would work "together with the chancellor". The text did not name Merz. It was signed by Kai Wegner, Boris Rhein, Hendrik Wüst, Gordon Schnieder, Michael Kretschmer, Sven Schulze, Daniel Günther and Mario Voigt. Union parliamentary leader Thorsten Frei said the Bundestag group still supported Merz; CSU leader Markus Söder separately declared his solidarity but did not sign the CDU letter.

Pressure on Merz to increase the pace on reform activity arose also from the Young Union, the youth organization of the CDU/CSU during their "Deutschlandtag" event held from 16 to 18 October in Bonn.

==== SPD ====
On 21 September 2026, SPD co-leader Lars Klingbeil, who is also Federal Finance Minister and Vice-Chancellor, described the previous day's state election results as leaving him with "mixed feelings". Regarding the Mecklenburg-Vorpommern election, Klingbeil credited Minister-President Manuela Schwesig's campaign and said the state party had "shown how to regain ground, how to fight". He called the result "a great encouragement for social democracy in general". He said the party could "not be satisfied" with the Berlin result. Berlin lead candidate Steffen Krach, who failed to win his constituency, called the outcome "catastrophic" and said: "We have no mandate to govern. That belongs to other parties. For years, the SPD was the Berlin party. With only 12% of the vote, we're not that anymore."

=== Leadership speculation ===
By the second week of September, German newspapers wrote of a Kanzlerdämmerung ("chancellor twilight") and an "Operation Chancellor Removal" inside the CDU. Three scenarios were widely discussed:

1. A voluntary resignation by Merz and a Union-internal succession (most often Wüst or Söder), with the SPD remaining in coalition—the so-called Kanzlertausch (chancellor swap).
2. Collapse of the coalition, either through SPD withdrawal or Union dismissal of SPD ministers, followed by a Union minority government seeking case-by-case majorities.
3. A chancellor-initiated confidence vote under Article 68 of the Basic Law, which could, if lost, open the way to a snap federal election. The next regular Bundestag election is not due until 2029.

The federal government dismissed reports that a minority cabinet was under consideration as "completely out of thin air". CSU leader Markus Söder and Saxony minister-president Michael Kretschmer publicly warned that a second consecutive collapse of a democratic federal government after the Scholz coalition would be "a penalty kick with no goalkeeper" for the AfD, while urging the coalition to accelerate rather than dilute reforms. Söder's public support for Merz was widely read as conditional.

Commentators noted the absence of an agreed successor and the risk that a snap election would further strengthen the AfD, which limited the incentive for either coalition party to bring the government down immediately. Political scientist Thomas Biebricher argued that Merz had failed at "one of the basic tasks of leadership: making the case to voters that accepting bitter pills now could lead to a brighter future." Die Zeit editor Bernd Ulrich wrote that the crisis had begun to "stabilise" Merz because nobody else wanted the post. On 13–14 September Merz travelled to an EU Arctic security summit in Rovaniemi, Finland, and used the flight to telephone senior CDU figures; he took no press questions on the domestic crisis.

== Reactions ==
=== Domestic ===
Mainstream parties restated the firewall against coalition with the AfD at federal and, in most cases, state level, while a growing minority of voters and some eastern CDU politicians questioned it. Anti-AfD demonstrations took place in several cities after the Saxony-Anhalt result. Coverage in Der Spiegel after the election called Merz "clearly the wrong man for the job at this time".

In September 2026, hundreds of thousands of people took the streets in Germany to voice opposition to the planned government reforms under the slogan "Hard-earned! Your work. Your health. Your pension." The German Trade Union Confederation, which organized some of these protests, said the reforms would put "secure jobs, good working conditions and the protection of workers' rights" at stake. Frank Werneke, leader of the trade union ver.di, accused the ruling coalition of an "attack" on workers' rights and the welfare state, demanding the "class struggle from above" finally come to an end.

An internet meme called "Merz Leck Eier" (Merz Lick Balls) garnered traction within Germany. The meme originates from a Berlin student’s protest sign at an anti-conscription demonstration on 5 March 2026 that mocked the Bundeswehr's testicular medical check during military screening. After police seized the sign, the phrase spread via the Streisand effect into stickers, concert chants, Google Maps pranks, and German rap tracks—most prominently Vita’s song "Merz Leck Eier". An oronym of the phrase, "Mehrzweckeier" (lit. 'Multi-purpose eggs'), was later rejected as a Youth Word of the Year candidate because it was judged a personal insult and campaign slogan rather than a general slang term.

=== International ===
European analysts treated the Saxony-Anhalt result as a warning about the stability of Germany's political centre and about Berlin's capacity to deliver on defence, fiscal and industrial commitments.

== See also ==
- 2026 European unrest
- 2024 German government crisis
- German economic crisis (2022–present)
