= Thore Stein =

German politician (born 1988)

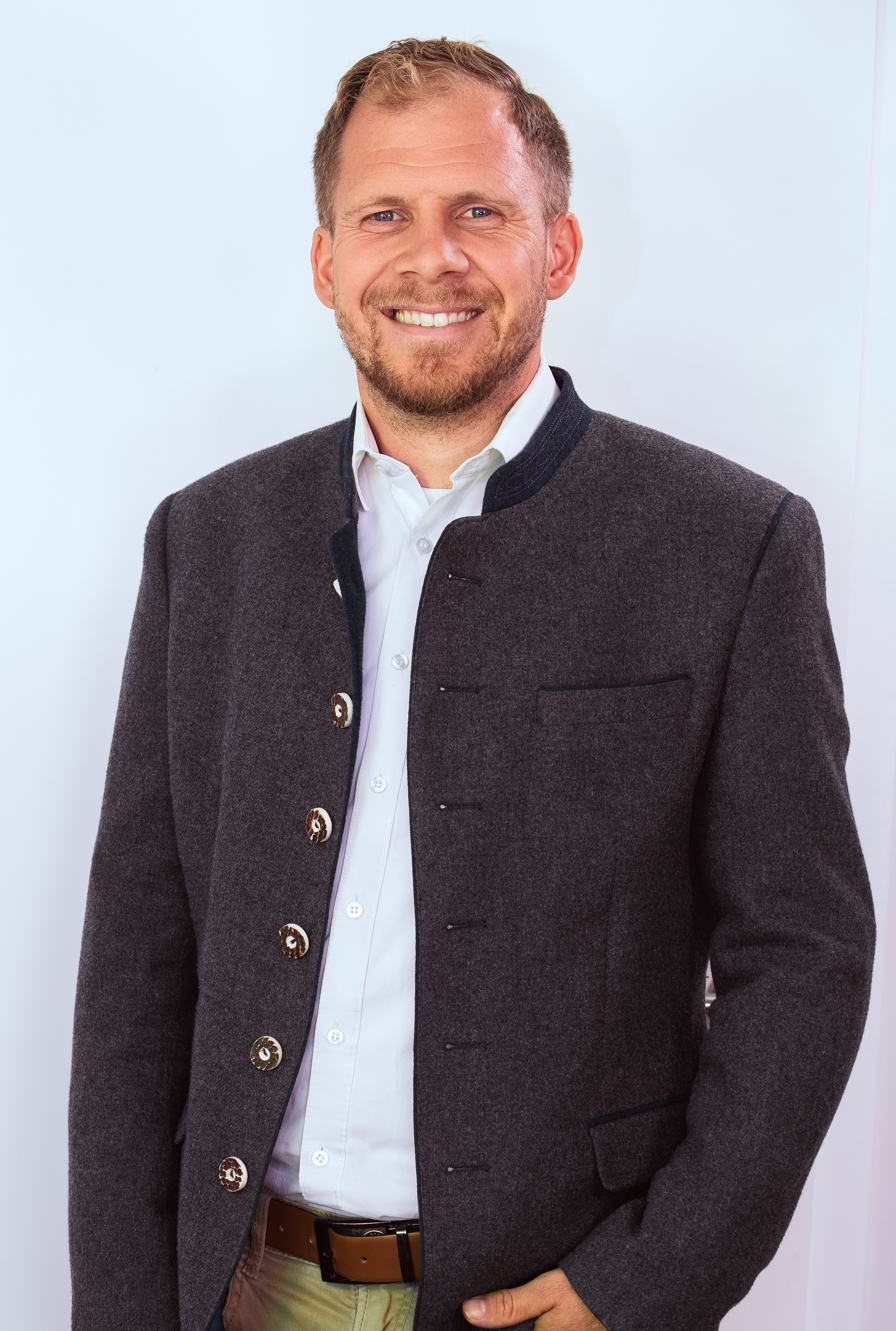
- Stein in 2025

Member of the Landtag of Mecklenburg-Vorpommern
- Incumbent
- Assumed office 26 October 2021

Personal details
- Born: 23 January 1988 (age 38) Ulm
- Party: Alternative for Germany (since 2013)

Thore Stein (born 23 January 1988 in Ulm) is a German politician serving as a member of the Landtag of Mecklenburg-Vorpommern since 2021. He is the chief whip of the Alternative for Germany group.
