= Birgit Hesse =

German politician (born 1975)

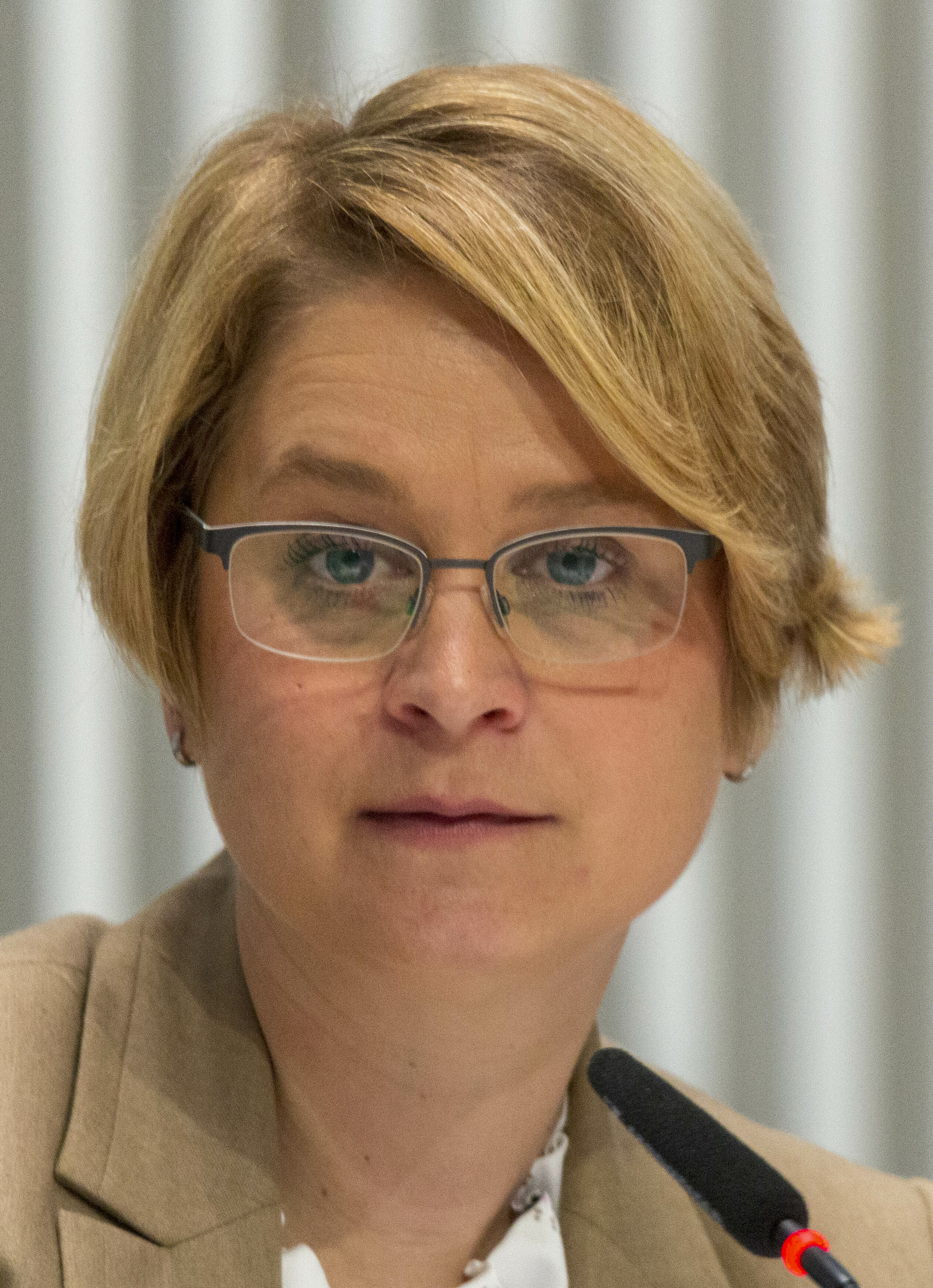
- Hesse in 2020

President of the Landtag of Mecklenburg-Vorpommern
- Incumbent
- Assumed office 22 May 2019
- Preceded by: Sylvia Bretschneider

Personal details
- Born: 16 February 1975 (age 51) Elmshorn
- Party: Social Democratic Party (since 2007)

Birgit Hesse (born 16 February 1975 in Elmshorn) is a German politician. She has been a member of the Landtag of Mecklenburg-Vorpommern since 2016, and has served as president of the Landtag since 2019. From 2016 to 2019, she served as minister of education, science and culture of Mecklenburg-Vorpommern. From 2014 to 2016, she served as minister of labour, equality and social affairs. From 2008 to 2014, she served as Landrat of Nordwestmecklenburg.
