= Beate Schlupp =

German politician (born 1965)

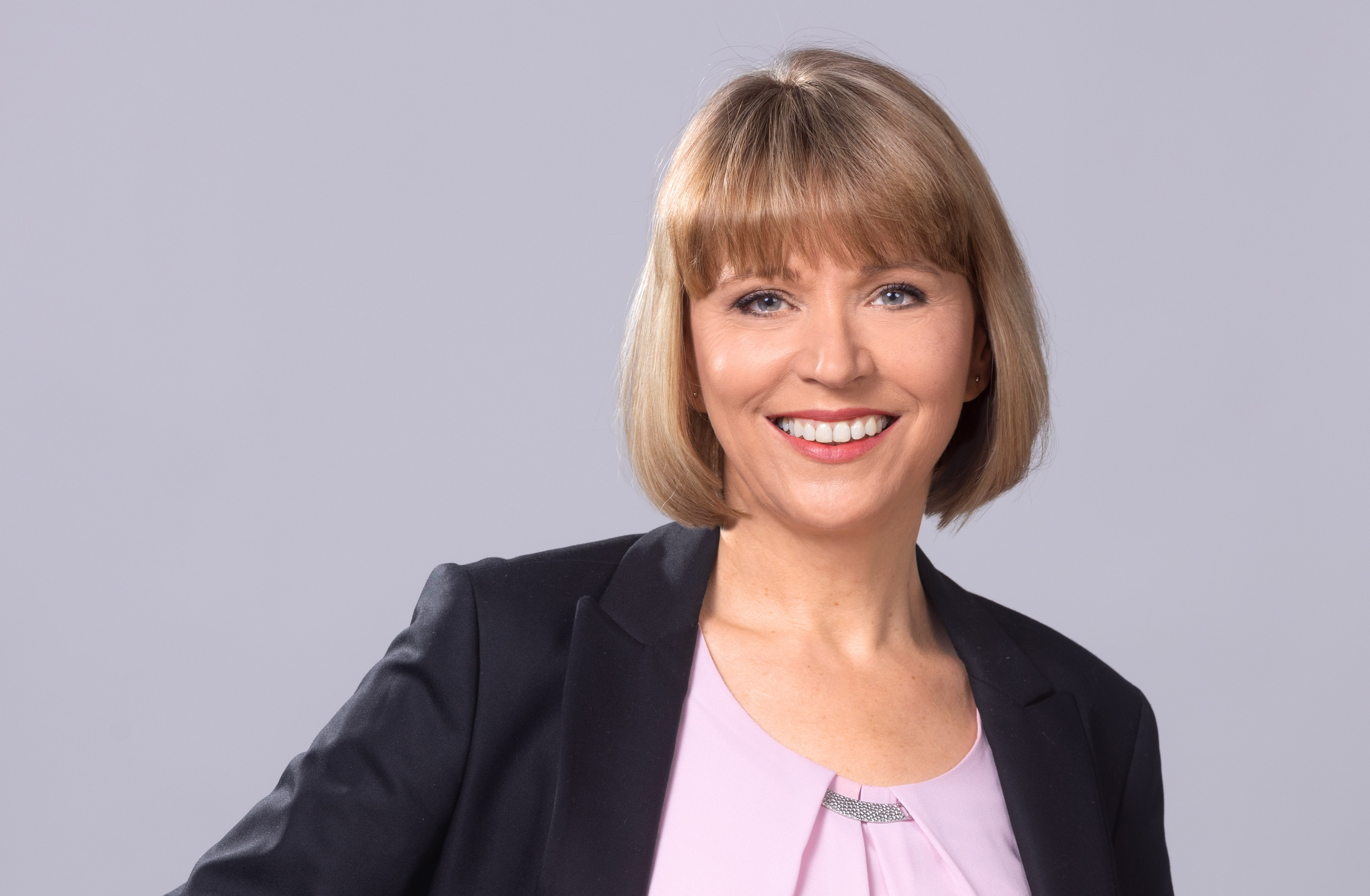
- Schlupp in 2021

Member of the Landtag of Mecklenburg-Vorpommern
- Incumbent
- Assumed office 22 October 2002
- Preceded by: Herbert Helmrich
- Constituency: Vorpommern-Greifswald V (2002–2016)

Personal details
- Born: 23 May 1965 (age 60) Neustrelitz
- Party: Christian Democratic Union

Beate Schlupp (born 23 May 1965 in Neustrelitz) is a German politician serving as a member of the Landtag of Mecklenburg-Vorpommern since 2002. She has served as vice president of the Landtag since 2011.
