= Sebastian Ehlers =

German politician (born 1982)

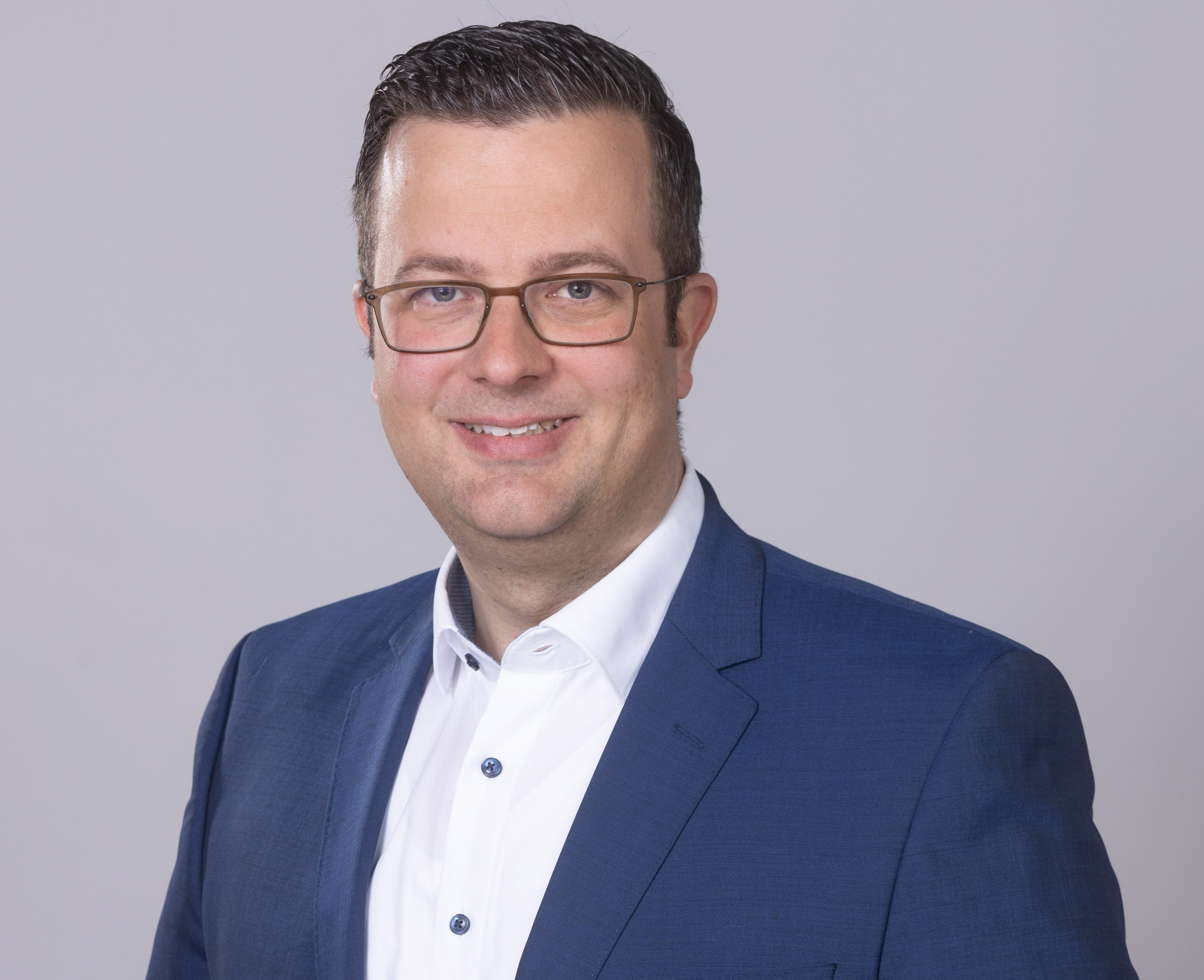
- Ehlers in 2021

Member of the Landtag of Mecklenburg-Vorpommern
- Incumbent
- Assumed office 4 October 2016

Personal details
- Born: 3 July 1982 (age 43) Schwerin
- Party: Christian Democratic Union (since 1997)

Sebastian Ehlers (born 3 July 1982 in Schwerin) is a German politician serving as a member of the Landtag of Mecklenburg-Vorpommern since 2016. He has served as Stadtpräsident of Schwerin since 2019.
