= Philipp da Cunha =

German politician (born 1987)

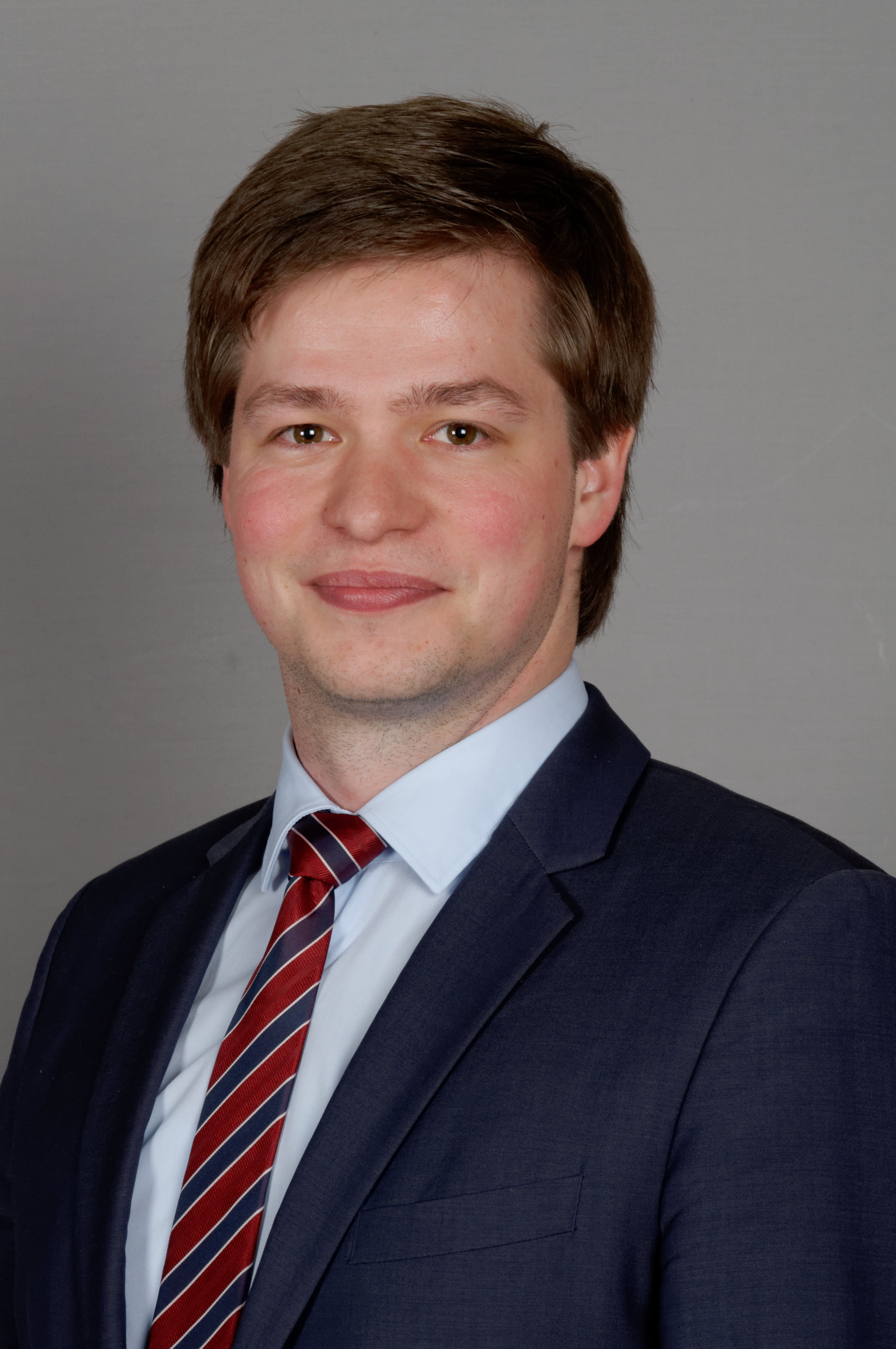
- da Cunha in 2017

Member of the Landtag of Mecklenburg-Vorpommern
- Incumbent
- Assumed office 4 October 2016

Personal details
- Born: 31 July 1987 (age 38) Hamburg
- Party: Social Democratic Party

Philipp da Cunha (born 31 July 1987 in Hamburg) is a German politician serving as a member of the Landtag of Mecklenburg-Vorpommern since 2016. He has served as chief whip of the Social Democratic Party since 2021.
