= Elke-Annette Schmidt =

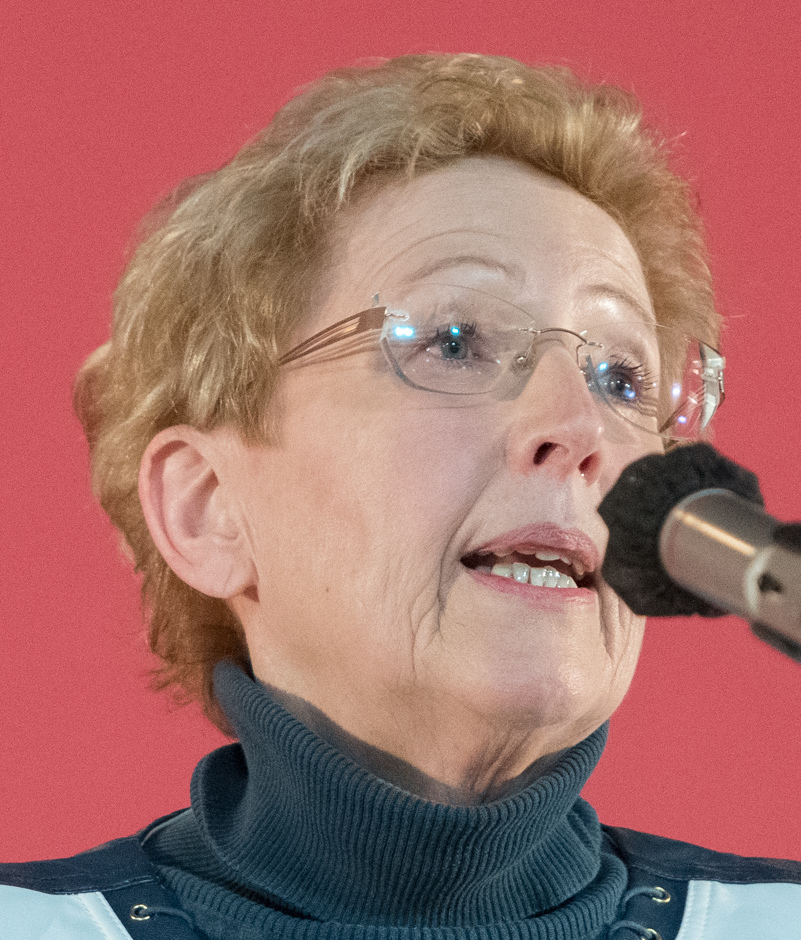

Member of the Landtag of Mecklenburg-Vorpommern
- Incumbent
- Assumed office 26 October 2021

Personal details
- Born: 23 October 1957 (age 68)
- Party: Die Linke
- Education: TU Dresden

Elke-Annette Schmidt is a German politician who has been a member of the Landtag of Mecklenburg-Vorpommern since 2021.
