= Rainer Prachtl =

German politician (1950–2024)

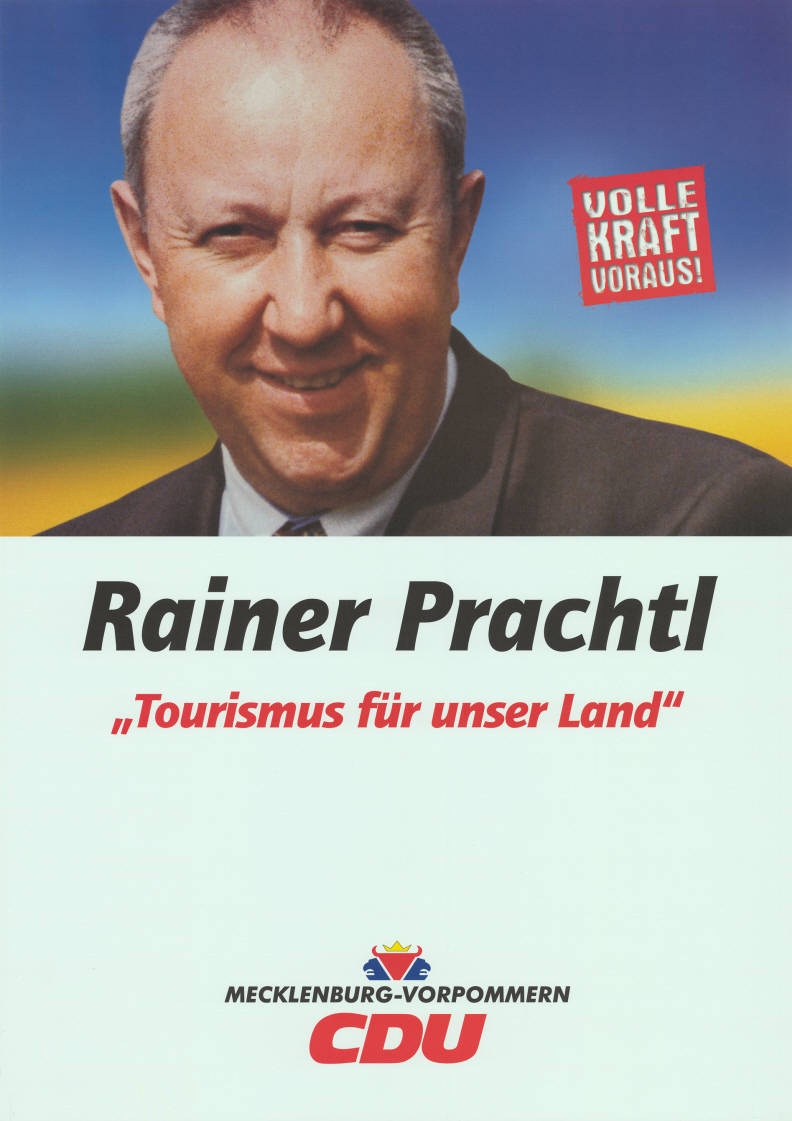
- Campaign poster for Prachtl in 1998

Member of the Landtag of Mecklenburg-Vorpommern
- In office 14 October 1990 – 17 September 2006
- Constituency: Constituency Neubrandenburg I (1990–1998) proportional representation (1998–2006)

Personal details
- Born: 15 January 1950 Neubrandenburg, Mecklenburg, East Germany
- Died: 12 October 2024 (aged 74) Neubrandenburg, Mecklenburg-Vorpommern, Germany
- Party: CDU
- Education: Handelshochschule Leipzig
- Occupation: Schoolteacher

Rainer Prachtl (15 January 1950 – 12 October 2024) was a German schoolteacher and politician. A member of the Christian Democratic Union, he served in the Landtag of Mecklenburg-Vorpommern from 1990 to 2006.

Prachtl died in Neubrandenburg on 12 October 2024, at the age of 74.
