= David Wulff =

German politician (born 1985)

Member of the Landtag of Mecklenburg-Vorpommern
- Incumbent
- Assumed office 26 October 2021

Personal details
- Born: 8 November 1985 (age 40) Lübz
- Party: Free Democratic Party (since 2002)

David Wulff (born 8 November 1985 in Lübz) is a German politician serving as a member of the Landtag of Mecklenburg-Vorpommern since 2021. From 2017 to 2024, he served as secretary general of the Free Democratic Party in Mecklenburg-Vorpommern.
