= Sylvia Bretschneider =

German politician (1960–2019)

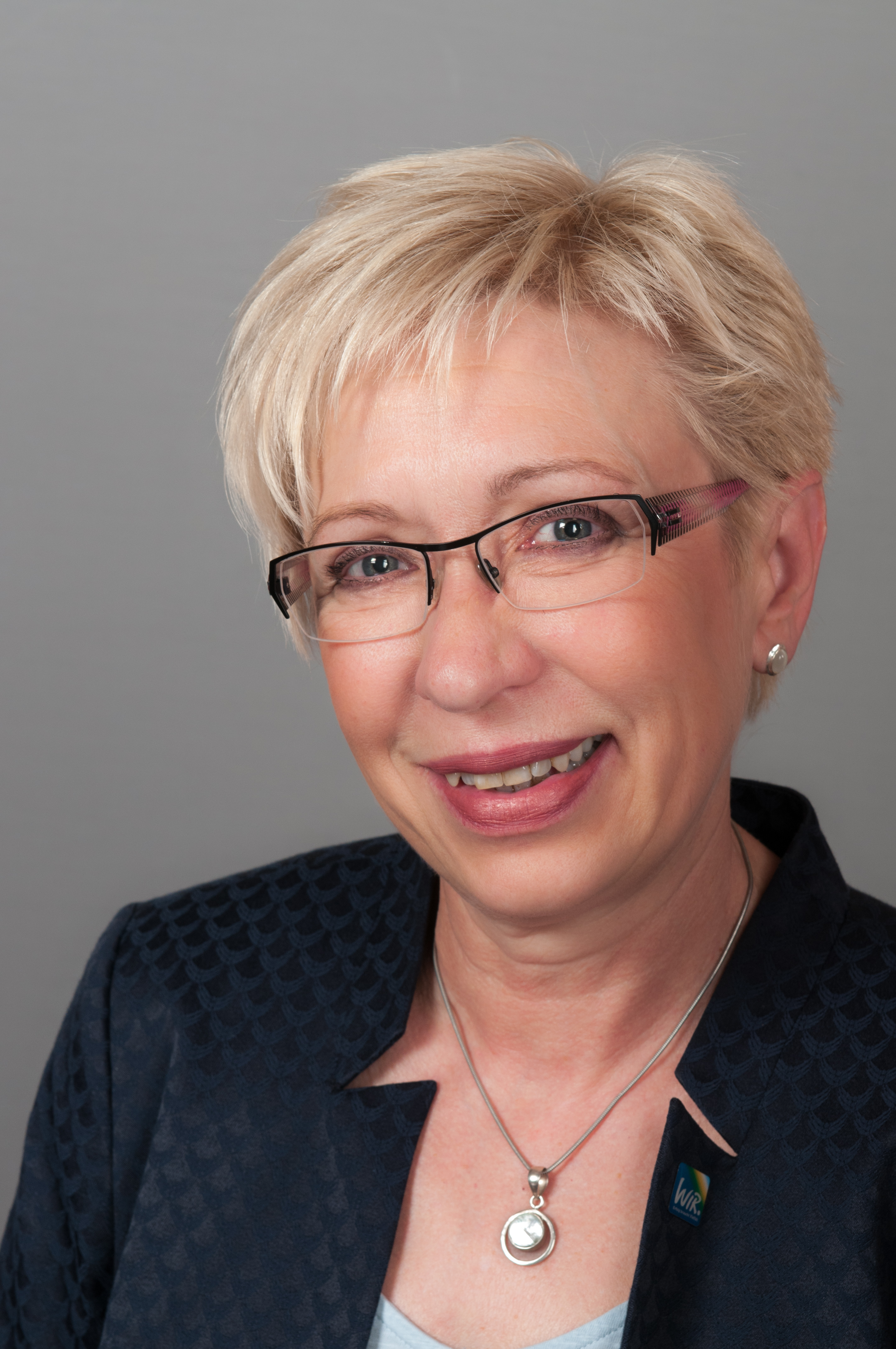
- Sylvia Bretschneider in 2017

Speaker of the Landtag of Mecklenburg-Vorpommern

Personal details
- Born: 14 November 1960 Waren, Bezirk Neubrandenburg, East Germany
- Died: 28 April 2019 (aged 58) Neubrandenburg, Mecklenburg-Western Pomerania, Germany
- Party: SPD
- Education: Leipzig University
- Occupation: Teacher; Education administrator; Politician
- Website: www.sylvia-bretschneider.de

Sylvia Bretschneider (14 November 1960 – 28 April 2019) was a German teacher, education administrator and politician (SPD). She was a member of the Landtag of Mecklenburg-Vorpommern between 1994 and 2017, taking over as speaker of the state parliament in 2002, and serving in that office, formally, till her death.

== Early life and career ==
Sylvia Bretschneider was born on 14 November 1960 in Waren (Müritz), a small town located between Rostock and Berlin. She attended school locally, successfully completing her Abitur in 1979. Between 1979 and 1983 she studied at the institute of Theoretical and Applied Language Sciences at Leipzig University, then called Karl Marx University, graduating with a teaching degree in the English and German languages. She worked as a teacher in Neubrandenburg between 1983 and 1989. In 1989 she switched careers, working for a year in a senior administrative position with the bus and transport company in her home town. She then worked from 1990 to 1994 at the Neubrandenburg Education Department.

== Political career ==
During the GDR years, Bretschneider was not a member of the ruling Socialist Unity Party of Germany (SED) nor of any other political party. During the Wende – the months of massive political change that followed the breaching by protesters of the Berlin Wall in November 1989 – she joined the moderately left-wing Social Democratic Party of Germany (SPD). She served as a member of the party's regional executive from 1991 to 2003, becoming deputy chair in 1998 or 1999.

In 1994, she was elected to the Landtag of Mecklenburg-Vorpommern, the state parliament of Mecklenburg-Vorpommern. Between 1994 and October 2002, she served as her party's speaker on education, youth policies and culture. In 2002, she was elected president of the Landtag, a position she continued to hold until her withdrawal from office. She was most recently re-elected in October 2016, receiving the votes of 45 of the chamber's 71 members. She was elected Speaker of Parliament (Landtagspräsidentin) in 2002.

Bretschneider withdrew from her offices in 2017 for cancer treatment.

== Personal life ==
Bretschneider was married; she and her husband had three daughters.

She died of cancer on 28 April 2019 in Neubrandenburg at the age of 58.
