= 1994 Mecklenburg-Vorpommern state election =

German state election

- 16 October 1994

All 71 seats in the Landtag of Mecklenburg-Vorpommern 34 seats needed for a majority
- Turnout: 977,867 (72.9%) ▲8.1%
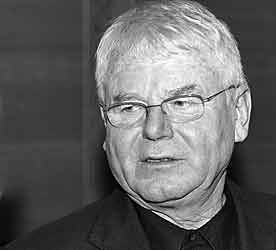

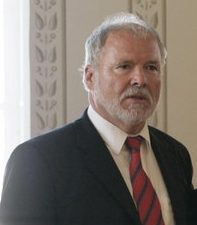
	First party	Second party
Leader	Berndt Seite	Harald Ringstorff
Party	CDU	SPD
Last election	29 seats, 39.4% (Note: Results for the CDU (38.3%) and CSU (1.1%).)	21 seats, 27.0%
Seats won	30	23
Seat change	▲1	▲2
Popular vote	368,206	288,431
Percentage	37.7%	29.5%
Swing	▼1.7%	▲2.5%
	Third party	Fourth party
Party	PDS	FDP
Last election	12 seats, 15.7%	4 seats, 5.5%
Seats won	18	0
Seat change	▲6	▼4
Popular vote	221,814	37,498
Percentage	22.7%	3.8%
Swing	▲7.0%	▼1.7%
- Results for the single-member constituencies
Minister-President before election
Berndt Seite
CDU
Elected Minister-President
Berndt Seite
CDU

The 1994 Mecklenburg-Vorpommern state election was held on 16 October 1994 to elect the members of the 2nd Landtag of Mecklenburg-Vorpommern. The incumbent government was a coalition of the Christian Democratic Union (CDU) and Free Democratic Party (FDP) led by Minister-President Berndt Seite. While the CDU remained the largest party in the Landtag, the FDP suffered a 1.7-point swing and lost all its seats. The CDU subsequently formed a grand coalition with the Social Democratic Party (SPD), and Seite continued in office. As of 2025, this is the last time when the CDU was the largest political party in the Landtag of Mecklenburg-Vorpommern.

== Parties ==
The table below lists parties represented in the 1st Landtag of Mecklenburg-Vorpommern.

Name		Ideology	Leader(s)	1990 result	
Name		Ideology	Leader(s)	Votes (%)	Seats
CDU	Christian Democratic Union of Germany; Christlich Demokratische Union Deutschlands	Christian democracy	Berndt Seite	39.4% (Note: Results for the CDU (38.3%) and CSU (1.1%).)	29 / 66
SPD	Social Democratic Party of Germany; Sozialdemokratische Partei Deutschlands	Social democracy	Harald Ringstorff	27.0%	21 / 66
PDS	Party of Democratic Socialism; Partei des Demokratischen Sozialismus	Democratic socialism		15.7%	12 / 66
FDP	Free Democratic Party; Freie Demokratische Partei	Classical liberalism		5.5%	4 / 66

== Election result ==
Summary of the 16 October 1994 election results for the Landtag of Mecklenburg-Vorpommern
Party	Votes	%	+/-	Seats	+/-	Seats %
Christian Democratic Union (CDU)	368,206	37.7	▼1.7 (Note: Compared to results for the CDU (38.3%) and CSU (1.1%).)	30	▲1 (Note: Compared to results for the CDU (30 seats) and CSU (0 seats).)	42.3
Social Democratic Party (SPD)	288,431	29.5	▲2.5	23	▲2	32.4
Party of Democratic Socialism (PDS)	221,814	22.7	▲7.0	18	▲6	25.4
Free Democratic Party (FDP)	37,498	3.8	▼1.7	0	▼4	0
Alliance 90/The Greens (Grüne)	36,035	3.7	▼5.6 (Note: Compared to results for The Greens (4.2%), New Forum (2.9%), and Alliance 90 (2.2%).)	0	±0	0
Others	25,883	2.6		0	±0	0
Total	977,867	100.0		71	±0	
Voter turnout		72.9	▲8.1			

Popular Vote
CDU	37.65%
SPD	29.50%
PDS	22.68%
FDP	3.83%
B'90/GRÜNE	3.69%
Other	2.65%

Landtag seats
CDU	42.25%
SPD	32.39%
PDS	25.35%

== Sources ==
- Landtagswahlen Mecklenburg-Vorpommern
