= Maya Tischler =

German politician (born 1996)

Member of the Landtag of Mecklenburg-Vorpommern
- Incumbent
- Assumed office 20 October 2026

Personal details
- Born: 22 August 1996 (age 30)
- Party: Alliance 90/The Greens

Maya Tischler (born 22 August 1996) is a German politician serving as a member of the Landtag of Mecklenburg-Vorpommern since 2026. She has served as second vice president of the Landtag since 2026.
