= Harald Ringstorff =

German politician (1939–2020)

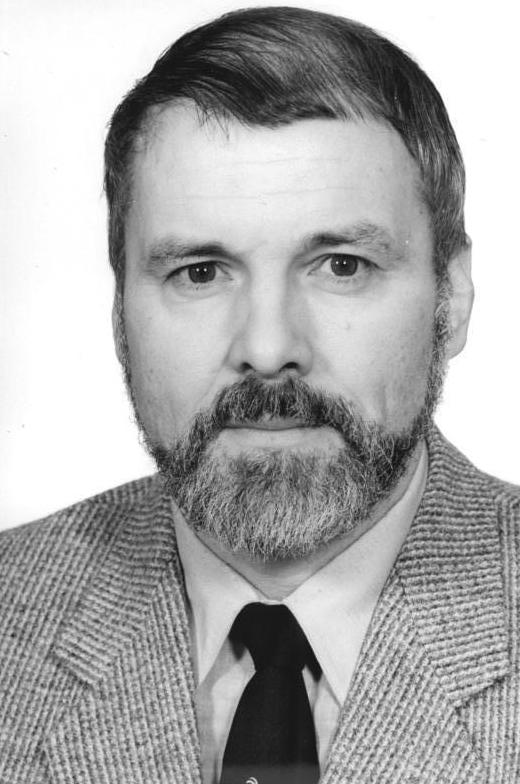

Minister-President of Mecklenburg-Vorpommern
- In office 3 November 1998 – 6 October 2008
- Deputy: Helmut Holter
- Preceded by: Berndt Seite
- Succeeded by: Erwin Sellering

President of Bundesrat
- In office 1 November 2006 – 31 October 2007
- President: Horst Köhler
- Chancellor: Angela Merkel
- Preceded by: Peter Harry Carstensen
- Succeeded by: Ole von Beust

Minister of Justice of Mecklenburg-Vorpommern
- In office 3 November 1998 – 19 September 2000
- Minister-President: Harald Ringstorff
- Preceded by: Rolf Eggert
- Succeeded by: Erwin Sellering

Deputy Minister-President of Mecklenburg-Vorpommern
- In office 8 December 1994 – 6 May 1996
- Minister-President: Bernd Seite
- Preceded by: Klaus Gollert
- Succeeded by: Hinrich Kuessner

Minister of Economics and Affairs of European Union of Mecklenburg-Vorpommern
- In office 8 December 1994 – 6 May 1996
- Minister-President: Bernd Seite
- Preceded by: Herbert Helmrich (Affairs of European Union; Conrad-Michael Lehment (Economics)
- Succeeded by: Rolf Eggert (Affairs of European Union); Jürgen Seidel (Economics)

Leader of the Social Democratic Party in the Landtag of Mecklenburg-Vorpommern
- In office 6 May 1996 – 3 November 1998
- Preceded by: Gottfried Timm
- Succeeded by: Volker Schlotmann
- In office 26 October 1990 – 15 November 1994
- Preceded by: Position established
- Succeeded by: Gottfried Timm

Member of the Landtag of Mecklenburg-Vorpommern for Parchim II (Rostock III; 1990–1994) (Social Democratic List; 1994–1998; 2006–2011)
- In office 26 October 1990 – 4 October 2011
- Preceded by: Constituency established
- Succeeded by: Thomas Schwarz

Member of the Volkskammer for Rostock
- In office 5 April 1990 – 2 October 1990
- Preceded by: Constituency established
- Succeeded by: Constituency abolished

Personal details
- Born: 25 September 1939 Wittenburg, Nazi Germany
- Died: 19 November 2020 (aged 81) Schwerin, Germany
- Party: SPD

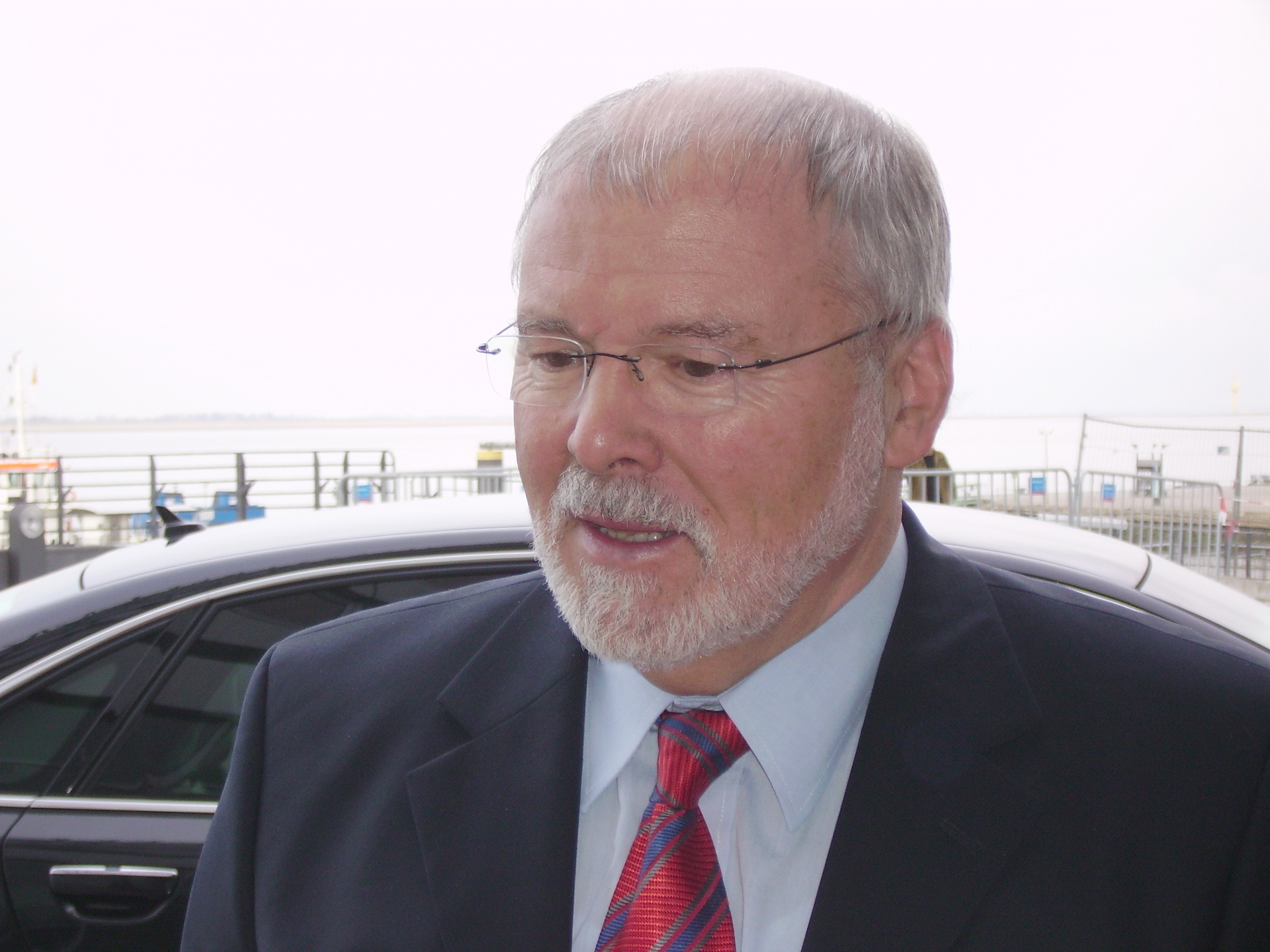
Ringstorff in 2008

Harald Ringstorff (25 September 1939 – 19 November 2020) was a German politician of the Social Democratic Party (SPD) and the Minister President of the state of Mecklenburg-Vorpommern. He headed a coalition government of the SPD and PDS (since 2007 the Left Party, Die Linke) from 1998 until 2006, and subsequently headed a coalition between the SPD and CDU. With a term of almost ten years, he is the longest-serving former incumbent to date (as of 2024). He served as President of the Bundesrat in 2006–07.

After his Abitur and military service, Ringstorff studied Chemistry at the University of Rostock. He received his Ph.D. in 1969. Afterwards he worked as a chemist for the Rostock dockyards. From 1987 to 1990, he was director of the branch office of the VEB Kali-Chemie ("people's enterprise for potash chemistry").

In 1989 Ringstorff was a founding member of the Social Democratic Party in the GDR and a member of the freely elected Volkskammer of 1990. From 1990 to 2003 he was chairman of the SPD in Mecklenburg-Vorpommern.

Since 1990 Ringstorff has been a member of the Landtag of Mecklenburg-Vorpommern where he served as parliamentary leader of the SPD from 1990 to 1994 and from 1996 to 1998. In between he was Minister for Economic and European Affairs and vice-minister-president in a coalition government with the CDU under minister-president Berndt Seite (CDU).

In 1998, the SPD agreed to form a coalition with the PDS (now Left Party), a move controversial within the party. Ringstorff was elected minister-president. His coalition government was re-elected in 2002. After the elections of 2006, he decided to switch to a coalition with the CDU, which would have a more comfortable majority in parliament.

On 6 August 2008, Ringstorff let it be known that he wished to resign as minister-president because of his age. On 6 October, he was succeeded in the office by Erwin Sellering.

He died from Parkinson's disease on 19 November 2020.
