= Berndt Seite =

German politician

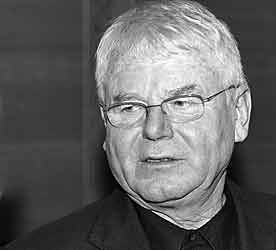

Minister President of Mecklenburg-Vorpommern
- In office 19 March 1992 – 3 November 1998
- President: Richard von Weizsäcker; Roman Herzog
- Chancellor: Helmut Kohl; Gerhard Schröder
- Preceded by: Alfred Gomolka
- Succeeded by: Harald Ringstorff

President of the Bundesrat
- In office 15 May 1992 – 31 October 1992
- Preceded by: Alfred Gomolka
- Succeeded by: Oskar Lafontaine

Personal details
- Born: Berndt Seite; 22 April 1940 (age 86) Trebnitz, Nazi Germany
- Party: Christian Democratic Union
- Spouse: Annemarie Brandt (m. 1964)
- Children: 2

Berndt Seite (born 22 April 1940 in Hahnswalde, Trebnitz) is a German politician. He was the 2nd minister president of Mecklenburg-Vorpommern from 1992 to 1998 and the 45th president of the German Bundesrat in 1992.

== Life ==
Berndt Seite was born in Hahnswalde near Trebnitz in Lower Silesia. He attended primary school in Ihleburg from 1946 to 1954 and then the Pforta state school in Schulpforte, where he graduated from high school in 1958. He then began studying veterinary medicine at the Humboldt University in Berlin, which he completed in November 1963.

== Politics ==
Seite turned to local politics in 1989 and was spokesman for the New Forum in the Röbel district. The following year he left the New Forum and joined the CDU in February 1990. From June 1990 to December 1991 he was district administrator in Röbel, and from October 1991 to March 1992 he was general secretary of the state association of the CDU in Mecklenburg-Western Pomerania.
