= Red–red–green coalition =

German political term

Red–red–green coalition, alternatively "red–green–red" or "green–red–red", refers to a left-wing political alliance of two "red" social democratic, socialist, or communist parties with one "green" environmentalist party.

== By country ==
=== Austria ===
In Austria, the term "red–red–green" (German: Rot-rot-grün) refers to a coalition between the Social Democratic Party of Austria (SPÖ), Communist Party of Austria (KPÖ), and The Greens. Red refers to the SPÖ and KPÖ and green refers to the Greens, although the KPÖ is sometimes denoted as "dark red" (German: Dunkelrot). Such a coalition has been discussed almost exclusively in the context of local politics in Graz, Austria's second-largest city, where the KPÖ has maintained a strong presence since the late 1990s. Unsuccessful discussions took place for such a coalition after the 2003 local election. In the 2021 Graz local election, the three "red–red–green" parties won a majority on the city council and subsequently formed a coalition government.

=== France ===
In Paris, a coalition of Socialist, Communist, and Green parties swept to power in 2014. In the following years, the city rose to the top of ratings for cycling-friendly cities, and became what Slate called "utopia for cyclists and pedestrians".

=== Germany ===

In Germany, "red–red–green" (German: Rot-rot-grün), often shortened to "R2G", refers to a coalition between the Social Democratic Party of Germany (SPD), The Left, and Alliance 90/The Greens. The name refers to the traditional colours of the parties, with red for the SPD and the Left and green for the Greens, although the Left is typically represented by purple to distinguish it from the SPD.

Although the possibility of such a coalition was discussed as early as the 1990s, it took until 2014 for the first red–red–green government to take office on a state level. Prior to this, unsuccessful discussions took place in the states of Saarland and Thuringia after their respective state elections in 2009, and North Rhine-Westphalia in 2010. Furthermore, minority governments between the SPD and Greens received external support from the Left (previously the Party of Democratic Socialism, PDS) in Saxony-Anhalt from 1994 to 1998, Berlin from 2001 to 2002, and North Rhine-Westphalia from 2010 to 2012. The first red–red–green coalition government was formed in 2014 in Thuringia, where it was led by The Left. Red–red–green coalitions have since been formed in Berlin in 2016 and Bremen in 2019, both under the leadership of the SPD.

Such coalitions have been established on a local level in cities including Dresden, Erfurt, and Saarbrücken. The possibility of a federal red–red–green coalition has been discussed at various times. In 2009, a group of members of the federal parliament from the SPD, Left, and Green parties began attending joint meetings at Berlin's Café Walden. They were subsequently dubbed the "Oslo group" in reference to the then-governing coalition of Norway comprising the Labour Party (red), Centre Party (green), and Socialist Left (red). After the 2013 federal election, both the Greens and SPD declared their willingness to consider a red–red–green coalition in the future. The coalition was widely discussed in the lead-up to the 2021 federal election, and the possibility of entering government played a major role in the Left's election strategy. The three parties ultimately fell short of a combined majority.

=== Norway ===
In Norway, the red–green coalition was a coalition government of the Labour Party (Ap), Socialist Left Party (SV), and Centre Party (Sp). Unlike most similar coalitions, the "green" Centre Party is a centrist, Eurosceptic Nordic agrarian party rather than a conventional green party. The red–green coalition took office after the 2005 election and governed until its defeat in the 2013 election. Despite the dissolution of the coalition, the three parties are often collectively referred to with the "red–green" label. They again won a combined majority in the 2021 election and sought to form a coalition. However, negotiations were unsuccessful and the SV did not join the government.

=== Sweden ===
In Sweden, the Red-Greens (Swedish: De rödgröna) was a political alliance established on 7 December 2008. It consisted of the Social Democrats, the Left Party, and the Green Party in the Riksdag, sitting in opposition to the centre-right Alliance Reinfeldt cabinet. The Red-Greens aimed to achieve a majority at the 2010 Swedish general election and form a coalition government. However, they failed to unseat the incumbent centre-right Alliance government, and the pact was dissolved in October 2010. The Social Democrats and the Green Party maintained close cooperation and formed the coalition minority Löfven I cabinet after the 2014 Swedish general election, with the Left Party providing confidence and supply.
