= 2019 Social Democratic Party of Germany leadership election =

- 14 October – 30 November 2019; 6–8 December (confirmation)
- Turnout: 226,775 (53.3%) (first round); 230,215 (54.1%) (second round)
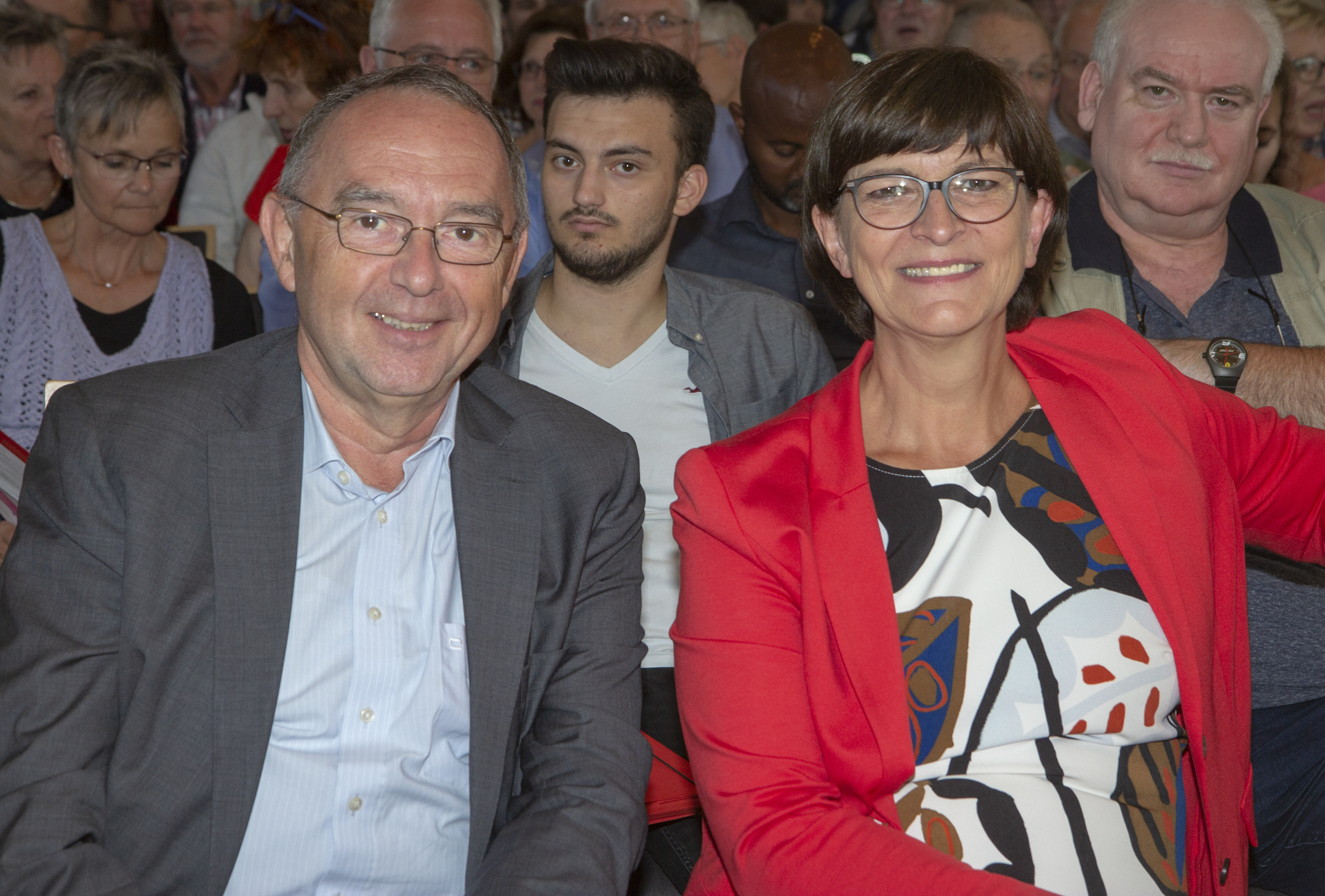

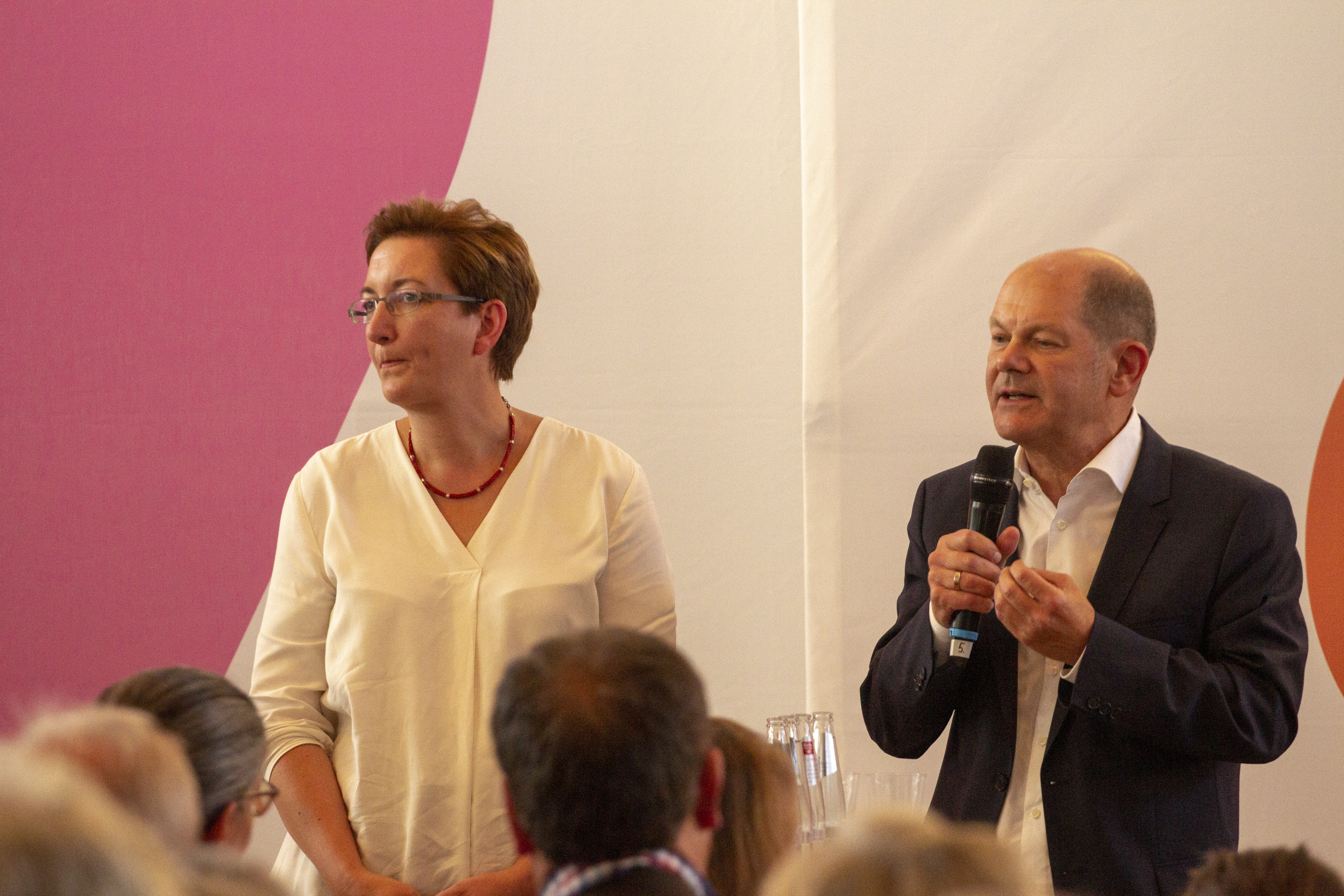
Candidate	Norbert Walter-Borjans; Saskia Esken	Olaf Scholz; Klara Geywitz
First round	44,967	48,473
First round %	21.0%	22.7%
Second round	114,995	98,246
Second round %	53.1%	45.3%
Leader before election
Malu Dreyer (acting)
Elected Leader
Saskia Esken and Norbert Walter-Borjans

The 2019 Social Democratic Party of Germany leadership election took place in the autumn of 2019 to elect the new leadership of the Social Democratic Party of Germany following the resignation of the Andrea Nahles on 3 June 2019. Although the leadership of the party is elected indirectly by a party convention, for the first time since 1993 the SPD held a vote by the membership to decide the candidates which the party's executive board will propose to the party convention. Though the convention was not obliged to elect the proposed candidates, the membership vote was considered politically binding. For the first time, dual candidacies were permitted, provided they comprised one man and one woman. Most hopeful candidates ran in pairs, and no single applicants advanced to the ballot.

The membership vote was held in two rounds, with the top two tickets from the first round proceeding to a runoff. In the first round held between 14 and 25 October, Olaf Scholz and Klara Geywitz placed first with 22.7% of the vote, while Norbert Walter-Borjans and Saskia Esken placed second with 21.0%. In the second round, Walter-Borjans and Esken won with 53.1% of the vote to Scholz and Geywitz's 45.3%.

This was seen as an upset victory for the left wing of the SPD, including skeptics of the grand coalition with the CDU. Esken and Walter-Borjans were little-known to the public at large, Esken being a backbencher in the Bundestag and Walter-Borjans being the former Minister of Finance of North Rhine-Westphalia from 2010 to 2017. Scholz, the incumbent Vice-Chancellor a business-friendly fiscal conservative, had the backing of much of the party establishment, including General-Secretary Lars Klingbeil and several Ministers-President such as Stephan Weil and Hamburg First Mayor Peter Tschentscher.

In December 2019, the SPD party convention elected Walter-Borjans and Esken as the new co-leaders of the party. Though they had previously hinted an end to the grand coalition with the CDU, they backed away from that, first proposing a revision of the coalition agreement. The CDU did not accept this, but the party nonetheless continued the coalition.

Walter-Borjans and Esken proved to be unpopular and barely-known leaders and their parties poll numbers did not recover from the low to mid tens. In August 2020, Walter-Borjans and Esken nominated the much more popular Scholz to be their Chancellor candidate for which they were widely mocked. However, in near the end of the 2021 German federal election, Scholz's personal popularity fueled a sudden surge of the SPD in the polls, leading to their victory and, eventually, Scholz becoming Chancellor.

Scholz's running mate, Klara Geywitz, who had lost her seat in the Landtag of Brandenburg during the campaign and went to work for the Brandenburg Court of Audit, would later be appointed Minister for Housing, Urban Development and Building by Scholz to his cabinet.

== Background ==
In the 2017 federal election, the SPD won just 20.5% of votes cast, its worst result in the history of the Federal Republic. Party leader Martin Schulz subsequently announced that the SPD would not renew the grand coalition with the Christian Democratic Union (CDU) in which it had served since 2013. However, in November, after it became clear that there were no viable alternatives, Schulz reneged on his pledge and called an extraordinary party conference which voted to negotiate a new coalition agreement with the CDU. Schulz was subject to significant opposition and criticism from the party, and resigned as leader in February 2018. However, the coalition agreement was approved by 66.0% of the party members in a vote held later that month, and the SPD re-entered government.

Schulz proposed Andrea Nahles as his successor, and she was confirmed as the SPD's new leader at a party convention in April 2018. Nahles quickly faced difficulties with the new government as many disputes arose over the summer of 2018, including the "asylum quarrel" and controversy around Hans-Georg Maaßen. Nahles was unable to stabilize her party as its performance in opinion polling declined to record lows, accompanied by a string of historically poor state election performances. In national polling, the SPD was overtaken by the Greens in October 2018, and the party polled around 15% through early 2019. In the 2019 European elections held on 26 May, the SPD placed third, winning only 15.8% of votes cast – the worst result for the party on a national level since 1887. Nahles came under major pressure to step down, and announced her resignation on 3 June. The party was thereafter led by acting leaders Malu Dreyer, Thorsten Schäfer-Gümbel and Manuela Schwesig until the party conference in December which elected the new leadership.

== Procedure ==
Party members were permitted to declare their candidacy between 1 July and 1 September. Candidates were able to run as a sole candidate to head the party alone, or with another member on a two-person ticket to serve as co-leaders. In the latter case, at least one candidate was required to be female. Each single candidate or two-person ticket needed sufficient support from state, regional, or local SPD associations in order to run. The requirements were one state association, one regional district, or five local districts. If no candidacy receives an absolute majority of the votes cast in the first round, the two candidacies with the highest number of votes cast proceed to a second round. Both votes were to be considered invalid if less than 20% of the party membership participated. The party's executive board was to propose the winner of the vote to the party convention which took place between 6 and 8 December.

== Candidates ==
=== Candidates ===
Candidates	State(s)	Announced	Slogan	Nomination	Ref.
Christina Kampmann: Family, youth, and culture minister in North Rhine-Westphalia (2015–17); Member of the Landtag of North Rhine-Westphalia (2017–); Michael Roth: Minister of state at the Federal Foreign Office (2013–); Member of the Bundestag (1998–)	North Rhine-Westphalia Hesse	3 July 2019	"With heart and attitude. Taking the plunge together." Mit Herz und Haltung. Gemeinsam den Aufbruch wagen.	District Hesse North; Sub-districts Hersfeld-Rotenburg, Werra-Meißner	
Karl Lauterbach: Member of the Bundestag (2005–); Deputy leader of the SPD Bundestag group (2013–19); Nina Scheer: Member of the Bundestag (2013–)	North Rhine-Westphalia Schleswig-Holstein	12 July 2019	"Social.Ecological.Clear."; Sozial.Ökologisch.Klar.	Sub-districts Düren/Jülich, Herzogtum Lauenburg, Lübeck, Segeberg, Stormarn, Essen, Leverkusen	
Gesine Schwan: SPD nominee for President of Germany (2004, 2009); Ralf Stegner: Leader of the SPD Landtag group in Schleswig-Holstein (2008–); Federal deputy leader of the SPD (2014–19)	Brandenburg Schleswig-Holstein	16 August 2019	"Passionate – genuinely social democratic." Leidenschaftlich – echt sozialdemokratisch.	Sub-districts Pinneberg, Rendsburg-Eckernförde, Rosenheim-Land, Steinburg, Berchtesgadener Land, Bremen-Nord, Frankfurt (Oder), Rosenheim	
Petra Köpping: Equality and integration minister in Saxony (2014–); Member of the Landtag of Saxony (2009–); Boris Pistorius: Interior minister in Lower Saxony (2013–); Mayor of Osnabrück (2006–13)	Saxony Lower Saxony	18 August 2019	"#TeamSPD"	State associations Lower Saxony, Saxony, Thuringia; Districts Hanover, Weser-Ems, Braunschweig; Sub-districts Erzgebirge, Leer, Leipzig-Land, Mittelsachsen, Nordsachsen, Osnabrück-Land, Sächsische Schweiz-Osterzgebirge, Leipzig, Braunschweig, Chemnitz, Goslar, Helmstedt, Hildesheim, Holzminden, Osnabrück, Hanover Region, Salzgitter, Wolfsburg	
Klara Geywitz: Member of the Landtag of Brandenburg (2004–19); General-secretary of the SPD in Brandenburg (2013–17); Olaf Scholz: Vice-Chancellor of Germany and federal finance minister (2018–); Mayor of Hamburg (2011–18)	Brandenburg Hamburg	20 August 2019	"For an SPD that can be proud of itself again." Für eine SPD, die wieder stolz auf sich sein kann.	State association Hamburg; Sub-districts Ostholstein, Cottbus, Potsdam, Spree-Neiße	
Norbert Walter-Borjans: Finance minister of North Rhine-Westphalia (2010–17); Saskia Esken: Member of the Bundestag (2013–)	North Rhine-Westphalia Baden-Württemberg	28 August 2019	"Steadfastly Social Democratic"; Standhaft Sozial Demokratisch	State association North Rhine-Westphalia; Sub-districts Calw, Rheinisch-Bergischer Kreis, Aachen	

=== Withdrew ===
Candidates	State(s)	Announced	Withdrew	Slogan	Nomination	Ref.
Simone Lange: Mayor of Flensburg (2017–); Member of the Landtag of Schleswig-Holstein (2012–16); Candidate for federal leader of the SPD (2018); Alexander Ahrens: Mayor of Bautzen (2015–)	Schleswig-Holstein Saxony	2 August 2019	4 September 2019; Endorsed Esken and Walter-Borjans	"Dare social democracy!" Sozialdemokratie wagen!	Sub-districts Bautzen, Schmalkalden, Schwarzwald-Baar, Pfaffenhofen, Dithmarschen, Flensburg	
Karl-Heinz Brunner: Member of the Bundestag (2013–); Mayor of Illertissen (1990–2002)	Bavaria	20 August 2019	16 September 2019			
Hilde Mattheis: Member of the Bundestag (2002–); Chairwoman of the Democratic Left Forum 21 (2011–); Dierk Hirschel: Chief economist at ver.di (2010–); Chief economist at the German Trade Union Confederation (2003–10)	Baden-Württemberg Berlin	18 August 2019	12 October 2019	"#MakeSocialDemocracyPossible" #MachtSozialdemokratieMöglich	Sub-districts Ulm, Sigmaringen, Ravensburg, Landshut, Vorpommern-Greifswald, Freudenstadt, Freiburg, Bad Tölz-Wolfratshausen	

=== Unsuccessful applicants ===
- Björn Kamlah (announced 13 July 2019)
- Hans Wallow (announced 15 July 2019)
- Robert Maier (announced 5 August 2019)
- Marcus del Monte (announced 17 August 2019)
- Stephan Frey (announced 28 August 2019)
- Jan Böhmermann (announced 29 August 2019)

=== Declined to run ===
- Malu Dreyer, acting federal leader and Minister-President of Rhineland-Palatinate (2013–)
- Franziska Giffey, federal Minister for Family, Women and Youth (2018–) and former mayor of Neukölln (2015–18)
- Hubertus Heil, federal Minister for Labour (2018–)
- Lars Klingbeil, General-Secretary of the SPD (2017–)
- Kevin Kühnert, chairman of the Jusos (2017–)
- Anke Rehlinger, deputy Minister-President of Saarland (2013–)
- Thorsten Schäfer-Gümbel, acting federal leader and leader of the SPD in Hesse (2009–)
- Manuela Schwesig, acting federal leader and Minister-President of Mecklenburg-Vorpommern (2017–)
- Stephan Weil, Minister-President of Lower Saxony (2013–)

== Campaign ==
Nominations closed on 1 September. A series of 23 conferences were held throughout that month and early October, at which the candidates presented themselves to the party membership and took questions. At least one conference was held in each of the states. In total, approximately 17,000 attendees turned out for the conferences.

Scholz and Geywitz were widely seen as the frontrunners due to Scholz's prominence; he was the only senior government figure to stand in the election. They represented a moderate course and a continuation of the SPD's involvement in the grand coalition, which had sharply divided the party. On the right of the party, Köpping and Pistorius advocated more conservative positions on migration and integration; despite receiving by far the most district endorsements of any ticket, they were weighed down by a poor performance during the campaign, though they remained contenders. Kampmann and Roth steered a soft left course and boosted their image with a professional campaign. The strongest opponents of the grand coalition on the party left were split between four – later three – tickets who hoped to proceed to the runoff: Walter-Borjans and Esken, Lauterbach and Scheer, Schwan and Stegner, and Mattheis and Hirschel. Mattheis and Hirschel were positioned furthest to the left of the party with little chance of success; they withdrew on the final day of the campaign. Schwan and Stegner favoured a membership vote on the coalition, while Scheer and Lauterbach called for an immediate withdrawal, as well as stronger climate policy. Though strongly critical of the coalition, Walter-Borjans and Esken took a softer stance and emphasised wealth redistribution and fighting inequality. They were considered the most likely to make the runoff, assisted by the endorsement of Jusos chairman Kevin Kühnert, who had himself declined to run.

== Opinion polling ==
=== Among members ===
Publication date	Polling firm	Scholz Geywitz	Lauterbach Scheer	Schwan Stegner	Köpping Pistorius	Lange Ahrens	Kampmann Roth	Esken Walter-Borjans	None/ Others
19–23 Aug 2019	Forsa	26	14	13	12	7	7	–	21
3 Oct 2019	wahlkreisprognose.de	19	5	6	20	–	23	21	6

=== Among officials ===
Publication date	Polling firm	Scholz Geywitz	Lauterbach Scheer	Schwan Stegner	Köpping Pistorius	Lange Ahrens	Kampmann Roth	None/ Others
19–23 Aug 2019	Forsa	22	13	13	15	11	10	16

=== Among voters ===
Publication date	Polling firm	Scholz Geywitz	Lauterbach Scheer	Schwan Stegner	Köpping Pistorius	Lange Ahrens	Kampmann Roth	Esken Walter-Borjans	None/ Others
26–28 Oct 2019	Civey	35.4	–	–	–	–	–	54.2	10.4
5–11 Sep 2019	Civey	23.3	11.0	11.7	14.4	–	6.9	14.0	18.7

== Results ==
Summary of the 2019 Social Democratic Party of Germany leadership election
Candidates	1st round		2nd round	
Candidates	Votes	%	Votes	%
Olaf Scholz & Klara Geywitz	48,473	22.68	98,246	45.33
Norbert Walter-Borjans & Saskia Esken	44,967	21.04	114,995	53.06
Christina Kampmann & Michael Roth	34,793	16.28		
Nina Scheer & Karl Lauterbach	31,271	14.63		
Petra Köpping & Boris Pistorius	31,230	14.41		
Gesine Schwan & Ralf Stegner	20,583	9.63		
Abstentions	2,376	1.11	3,480	1.60
Invalid/blank votes	1,263	0.59	454	0.21
Total	214,956	100.00	217,175	100.00
Rejected ballots	11,819	5.21	13,040	5.66
Ballots received/turnout	226,775	53.28	230,215	54.09
Eligible voters	425,630		425,630	
Results: 1st round, 2nd round

First Round
Scholz/Geywitz	22.68%
Walter-Borjans/Esken	21.04%
Kampmann/Roth	16.28%
Scheer/Lauterbach	14.63%
Köpping/Pistorius	14.41%
Schwan/Stegner	9.63%

Second Round
Walter-Borjans/Esken	53.06%
Scholz/Geywitz	45.33%
