= Manuela Schwesig =

German politician (born 1974)

Manuela Schwesig MdL MdBR
- Schwesig in 2024

Minister-President of Mecklenburg-Vorpommern
- Incumbent
- Assumed office 4 July 2017
- Deputy: Lorenz Caffier; Harry Glawe; Simone Oldenburg
- Preceded by: Erwin Sellering

Leader of the Social Democratic Party of Mecklenburg-Vorpommern
- Incumbent
- Assumed office 2 June 2017
- Deputy: Stefan Sternberg; Nadine Julitz; Christian Pegel; Erik von Malottki; Reem Alabali-Radovan
- General Secretary: Julian Barlen
- Preceded by: Erwin Sellering

President of the Bundesrat
- In office 1 November 2023 – 31 October 2024
- First Vice President: Peter Tschentscher
- Preceded by: Peter Tschentscher
- Succeeded by: Anke Rehlinger

Leader of the Social Democratic Party
- Acting
- In office 3 June 2019 – 10 September 2019 Serving with Malu Dreyer, Thorsten Schäfer-Gümbel
- General Secretary: Lars Klingbeil
- Preceded by: Andrea Nahles
- Succeeded by: Norbert Walter-Borjans; Saskia Esken

Deputy Leader of the Social Democratic Party
- In office 13 November 2009 – 10 September 2019
- Leader: Sigmar Gabriel; Martin Schulz; Andrea Nahles
- Preceded by: Peer Steinbrück
- Succeeded by: Klara Geywitz

Minister of Family Affairs, Senior Citizens, Women and Youth
- In office 17 December 2013 – 2 June 2017
- Chancellor: Angela Merkel
- Preceded by: Kristina Schröder
- Succeeded by: Katarina Barley

First Vice President of the Bundesrat
- Incumbent
- Assumed office 1 November 2024
Mecklenburg-Vorpommern Cabinet
Minister of Labour, Equality and Social Affairs
In office 25 October 2011 – 16 December 2013
Minister-President	Erwin Sellering
Preceded by	herself (Social Affairs); Jürgen Seidel (Labour)
Succeeded by	Birgit Hesse
Minister of Health and Social Affairs
In office 6 October 2008 – 25 October 2011
Minister-President	Erwin Sellering
Preceded by	Erwin Sellering
Succeeded by	herself (Social Affairs)
Landtag constituencies
Member of the Landtag of Mecklenburg-Vorpommern for Schwerin I
Incumbent
Assumed office 26 October 2021
Preceded by	Erwin Sellering (2019)
In office 4 October 2011 – 14 January 2014
Preceded by	Gottfried Timm
Succeeded by	Dagmar Kaselitz

Personal details
- Born: Manuela Frenzel; 23 May 1974 (age 52) Frankfurt (Oder), Bezirk Frankfurt (Oder), East Germany (now Brandenburg, Germany)
- Party: Social Democratic Party (2003–)
- Spouse: Stefan Schwesig (m. 2000)
- Children: 2
- Education: Fachhochschule für Finanzen Brandenburg
- Occupation: Politician; Tax Investigator; Civil Servant
- Website: Official website

Manuela Schwesig (German pronunciation: [manuˈeːla ˈʃʋeːzɪç]; née Frenzel, born 23 May 1974) is a German politician of the Social Democratic Party serving as Minister President of Mecklenburg-Vorpommern since 4 July 2017, becoming the first woman to serve in that post. Previously she served as Federal Minister of Family Affairs, Senior Citizens, Women and Youth in the third cabinet of Angela Merkel from 2013 to 2017. She was President of the Bundesrat from 1 November 2023 to 31 October 2024.

== Early life and education ==
Born in Frankfurt (Oder), East Germany, Schwesig grew up in the nearby town of Seelow. In 1990, she played a small acting role in the DEFA film Forbidden Love, which had the title Verbotene Liebe (Verbotene Liebe (1990)) in the original German and which was directed by Helmut Dziuba. After graduation in 1992 from the Gymnasium auf den Seelower Höhen, she completed studies in higher civil service (tax administration) of the federal state of Brandenburg. She attended the Training and Further Education Centre (Fachhochschule für Finanzen) in Königs Wusterhausen.

== Political career ==
=== Career in local politics ===
Schwesig became a member of SPD in 2003, at the age of 29. She subsequently served as a member of the Schwerin City Council from 2004 to 2008.

=== Career in national politics ===
Schwesig became a Federal Deputy Leader of the SPD on 13 November 2009 alongside Thorsten Schäfer-Gümbel and Olaf Scholz (and later Aydan Özoğuz and Ralf Stegner). She was then appointed State Minister of Social Affairs and Health in Mecklenburg-Vorpommern on 6 October 2008, under the leadership of Minister‐President Erwin Sellering. She served as minister and became member of the Landtag of Mecklenburg-Vorpommern from 4 September 2011 until she joined the federal government.

Ahead of the 2009 elections, German Foreign Minister Frank-Walter Steinmeier included Schwesig, then a relatively unknown face to the German public, in his shadow cabinet of 10 women and eight men for the Social Democrats' campaign to unseat incumbent Angela Merkel as Chancellor. During the campaign, Schwesig served as shadow minister for family affairs who advocated the party's family-friendly policies.

Schwesig was a SPD delegate to the Federal Convention for the purpose of electing the President of Germany in 2010, 2012, 2017 and 2022.

In 2011, Schwesig led high-level talks with Chancellor Angela Merkel and Labor Minister Ursula von der Leyen for the then-opposition Social Democrats on reaching a compromise over how to increase basic social welfare benefits for the unemployed.

Following the 2013 elections, Schwesig served as the Social Democrats' main negotiator in the working group for families, women and equal opportunities when Germany's two largest parties, Chancellor Angela Merkel's conservative bloc and the left-leaning Social Democrats, held talks on forming a broad coalition government.

=== Federal Minister of Family Affairs, 2013–2017 ===
In the third Merkel cabinet, Schwesig, who at 39 was the youngest cabinet member, became the Federal Minister of Family Affairs, Senior Citizens, Women and Youth – a position also occupied by Merkel in her first cabinet post under German Chancellor Helmut Kohl in the early 1990s.

At an SPD convention in late 2015, Schwesig received 93 percent of members' ballots, the best result of any of the party leadership. Shortly after, the party's board mandated Schwesig and Thomas Oppermann with the task of drafting an electoral program for the 2017 federal elections.

=== Minister‐president of Mecklenburg-Vorpommern, 2017–present ===
On 30 May 2017, Schwesig announced that she would seek the succession of Erwin Sellering as Minister‐president of Mecklenburg-Vorpommern. As consequence, she resigned as federal minister, the resignation taking effect on 2 June. On 4 July 2017, Schwesig became Minister‐president of Mecklenburg-Vorpommern.

As one of the state's representatives at the Bundesrat, Schwesig serves on the Committee on Foreign Affairs. She also chairs the German-Russian Friendship Group set up by the Bundesrat and the Russian Federation Council.

In the negotiations to form a fourth coalition government under Merkel following the 2017 federal elections, Schwesig led the working group on education policy, alongside Annegret Kramp-Karrenbauer, Stefan Müller and Hubertus Heil.

Together with Doris Ahnen, Niels Annen, Oliver Kaczmarek and Anke Rehlinger, Schwesig co-chaired the SPD's extraordinary 2018 convention, during which the party elected Andrea Nahles as its first-ever female leader.

From June 2019, Schwesig – together with her party colleagues Malu Dreyer and Thorsten Schäfer-Gümbel – was chosen as the SPD's interim leader, following former leader Andrea Nahles' decision to step down and leave politics. In September 2019, Schwesig announced she had been diagnosed with breast cancer and would step down from her duties at national level.

In 2019, she was appointed by the Federal Ministry of the Interior, Building and Community to serve on the committee that oversaw the preparations for the 30th anniversary of German reunification.

Schwesig led the SPD into the 2021 state election. Though the CDU had led the polls throughout 2020, the SPD experienced a major resurgence from July. By this time, Schwesig had established herself as a prominent and popular figure both within the state and across the country. The party's campaign was heavily based around her, running with the slogan "Die Frau für MV" ("the woman for Mecklenburg-Vorpommern"). The SPD a landslide victory with 39.6% of votes while the AfD, CDU, and Left all suffered losses. They chose to seek a coalition government with the Left, breaking the grand coalition with the CDU after fifteen years in power.

== Political positions ==
=== Child protection ===
Schwesig is a member of the German Child Protection League. Her main focus is to fight child poverty and provide for good state childcare facilities. In 2009 she supported the idea promoted by Minister Ursula von der Leyen to block websites featuring child pornography.

On her order the employees of nursery schools in Mecklenburg-Vorpommern have to declare their commitment to uphold the principles of Germany's basic laws (the constitution).

=== Advancement of women ===
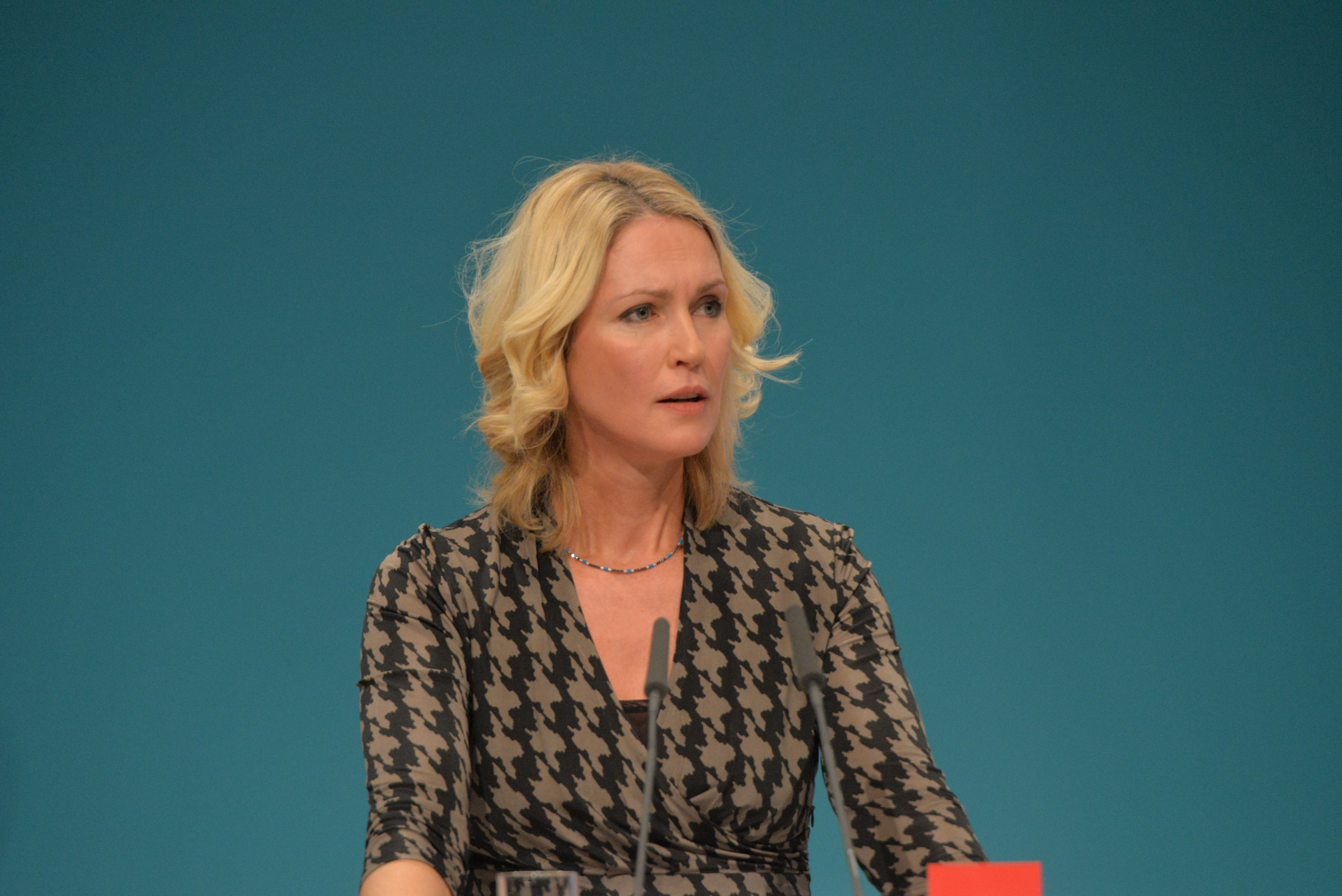
Schwesig in 2014

In 2014, Schwesig helped introducing a bill mandating compulsory quotas for women on the supervisory boards of the Germany's top companies, which was passed in early 2015. Also in early 2015, she called for a law that would force companies to allow female employees to see how their salaries compare with those of male colleagues. Meanwhile, she has been championing a substantial expansion of state-sponsored child care facilities.

In 2016, Schwesig successfully introduced changes to Germany's maternity protection legislation by expanding the laws to include groups of women not explicitly covered (including school and university students, women working as interns, and women pursuing vocational training) and attempting to reduce bureaucratic red tape.

Alongside Dietmar Woidke, Schwesig was instrumental in the Bundesrat's 2020 selection of Ines Härtel as the Federal Constitutional Court’s first judge from East Germany.

=== Political extremism ===
In a 2014 lawsuit before the Federal Constitutional Court of Germany, the far-right National Democratic Party of Germany (NPD) complained about comments made by Schwesig during that year's parliamentary election campaign for the state of Thuringia. In a newspaper interview, Schwesig had said: "The number one goal is that the NPD does not make it into the parliament." The NPD accused the minister of breaching her duty of neutrality and interfering with the campaign, and made a complaint before the Federal Constitutional Court. The court ruled in December 2014 that Schwesig did not damage the NPD's right to a level playing field because her comments fell under the "political struggle of opinion."

== Controversy ==
=== Nord Stream 2 ===
In her role as Minister President of Mecklenburg-Vorpommern Schwesig stated her strong support for Nord Stream 2, which like Nord Stream 1 makes landfall in her state, near Lubmin: "We believe that it is right to build the pipeline. Nobody who is working on building the pipeline is doing anything wrong. The ones doing something wrong are those who are trying to stop the pipeline." Her government created a foundation with the explicit goal, as written in its charter, of completing the Nord Stream 2 pipeline. Amid a 2020 diplomatic row over the construction of the Nord Stream 2 pipeline, three U.S. senators − Ted Cruz, Tom Cotton, and Ron Johnson – sent a letter to a Baltic Sea port operator in Schwesig's state, threatening the port's managers with “crushing legal and economic sanctions” if they continued to support the project servicing the Russian ships laying the pipe. In response, Schwesig called the letter "blackmail".

After the poisoning of opposition figure Alexei Navalny, Schwesig insisted it should have no effect on the construction of the pipeline. Ultimately, the project was cancelled after the 2022 Russian invasion of Ukraine. Furthermore, Schwesig was revealed to have been colluding with the Russians, allowing Gazprom to run PR for the pipeline via her office and modifying her public speeches in accordance with the Russian demands.

Schwesig has been listed by Politico among 12 Germans who got played by Putin.

In February 2022, Schwesig lost a court case against member of the Bundestag Christoph Ploß (CDU). She had demanded he limit his criticisms of her politics but a district court determined that it was well within allowed freedom of expression.

In January 2023, controversy arose over contacts Schwesig had with various people as part of Reuters research into Russian influence in Germany and German politics. She had contact with Oleg Eremenko who had formerly worked for the Russian secret service (GRU) and now is the owner of a construction company in Berlin. Event records show Eremenko was in contact during 2016 with Igor Girkin, a colonel in the Russian military intelligence service GRU, who had played a leading role in the Russian intervention in the Donbas and the Russian annexation of Crimea in 2014. "Schwesig's spokesman Andreas Timm said ... that there had been 'no scheduled meeting' between the Prime Minister and Eremenko [and that] she took part in the event at the invitation of the city of Greifswald."

In March 2024 media reported that Schwesig had intervened into the process of publication of an declaratively independent report on the options for closure of Stiftung Klima- und Umweltschutz MV (Climate and Environment Protection Foundation) which served as a Gazprom-sponsored lobbyist for Nord Stream 2. Schwesig manually deleted paragraphs from the report that suggested that closure of the foundation is feasible and desirable.

== Personal life ==
Schwesig has been married to Stefan Schwesig since 2000, and they have two children. The family lives in Schwerin. Although they had previously identified as non-religious, the family was baptized in 2010 in the Evangelical Lutheran Church of Mecklenburg.

In September 2019, Schwesig was diagnosed with breast cancer and subsequently resigned from her federal-level party offices. She later confirmed that the cancer was treatable and underwent medical treatment. On 12 May 2020, she announced that she had successfully overcome the illness.

== Other activities ==
- Franco-German Youth Office (FGYO), Ex-officio co-chair of the Board of Governors
- Friedrich Ebert Foundation (FES), Member
- Deutsche Telekom, Yes, I can! Initiative for Children and Young People, Member of the Board of Trustees
- Deutsches Museum, Ex-Officio Member of the Board of Trustees
- Plan International Deutschland, Member of the Board of Trustees
- Gegen Vergessen – Für Demokratie, Member
- German Association for the Protection of Children (DKSB), Member
- German Forum for Crime Prevention (DFK), Member of the Board of Trustees
- Mecklenburg State Theatre, Member of the Supervisory Board
- Total E-Quality initiative, Member of the Board of Trustees

Political offices
Preceded by Kristina Schröder	Minister of Family Affairs, Senior Citizens, Women and Youth; 2013–2017	Succeeded by Katarina Barley
Preceded by Erwin Sellering	Minister-President of Mecklenburg-Vorpommern; 2017–present	Incumbent
Preceded by Peter Tschentscher	President of the Bundesrat; 2023–2024	Succeeded by Anke Rehlinger
