= Ralf Stegner =

German politician (born 1959)

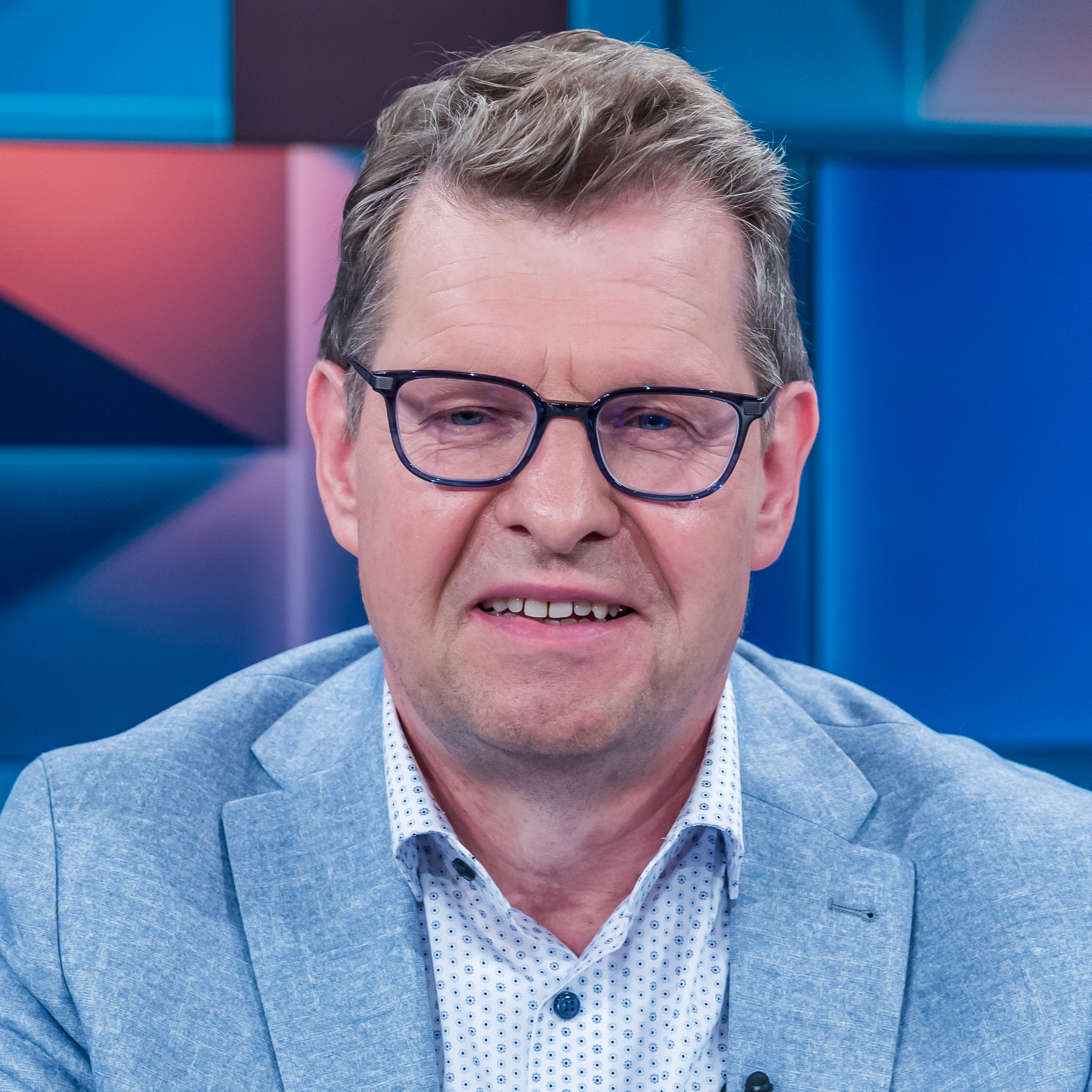
- Stegner at hart aber fair in 2024

Leader of the Opposition in Schleswig-Holstein
- In office 28 June 2017 – 2021
- Prime Minister: Daniel Günther
- Preceded by: Daniel Günther
- In office 21 July 2009 – 12 June 2012
- Prime Minister: Peter Harry Carstensen
- Preceded by: Wolfgang Kubicki
- Succeeded by: Johannes Callsen

Deputy Leader of the Social Democratic Party
- In office 16 January 2014 – 6 December 2019 Serving with Malu Dreyer, Manuela Schwesig, Olaf Scholz, Thorsten Schäfer-Gümbel and Natascha Kohnen
- Leader: Sigmar Gabriel; Martin Schulz; Andrea Nahles
- Preceded by: Andrea Nahles
- Succeeded by: Serpil Midyatli

Leader of the Social Democratic Party in Schleswig Holstein
- In office 24 March 2007 – 31 March 2019
- Preceded by: Heide Simonis
- Succeeded by: Serpil Midyatli

Minister of the Interior of Schleswig-Holstein
- In office 27 April 2005 – 15 January 2008
- Prime Minister: Peter Harry Carstensen
- Preceded by: Klaus Buß
- Succeeded by: Lothar Hay

Minister of Finance of Schleswig-Holstein
- In office 1 March 2003 – 27 April 2005
- Prime Minister: Heide Simonis
- Preceded by: Claus Möller
- Succeeded by: Rainer Wiegard

Member of the Landtag of Schleswig-Holstein
- Incumbent
- Assumed office 20 February 2005
- Constituency: State List

Personal details
- Born: 2 October 1959 (age 67) Bad Dürkheim, West Germany
- Party: Social Democratic Party of Germany
- Education: University of Freiburg, Harvard Kennedy School (HKS)

Ralf Stegner (born 2 October 1959) is a German politician of the Social Democratic Party (SPD) who has been serving as a member of the German Bundestag for the constituency of Pinneberg since the 2021 elections.

Stegner was the leader of the SPD in Schleswig-Holstein from 2007 to 2019. He also served as the leader of the opposition in Schleswig-Holstein from 2017 to 2021, an office he had previously held from July 2009 to June 2012. He is considered a member of the SPD's left wing.

== Early life and education ==
Stegner was born in Bad Dürkheim, Germany on October 2, 1959, and received his high school diploma in 1978. In addition to his degree in Political Science, History and German from the University of Freiburg (1980-1987), Stegner earned a Master of Public Administration from Harvard Kennedy School at Harvard University (1987–1989).

== Political career ==
=== Role in state politics ===
From 1990 to 1994, Stegner served as a spokesman for the Schleswig-Holstein Ministry of Social Affairs, Kiel. From 1994 to 1996 he was head of staff department, Ministry of Social Affairs Schleswig Holstein, Kiel. From 1996 to 2005, Stegner served in various roles in the state government of Minister-President Heide Simonis. He was State Secretary for Labor, Social Affairs and Health from 1996 to 1998 before serving as State Secretary for Education, Research and Cultural Affairs from 1998 to 2003. Between 2003 and until Simonis' resignation in 2005, he was the State Minister of Finance.

Stegner has been a member of the Landtag of Schleswig-Holstein since the 2005 state elections. After Simonis's attempt to form a new one-seat majority red-green government supported by a regional party had failed because throughout four secret ballots one representative had not voted for her, she withdrew from politics and Stegner practically took over from her and became Deputy Minister-President and State Minister for Home Affairs in the subsequent CDU-SPD grand coalition led by Minister-President Peter Harry Carstensen. Although Stegner had harshly criticised the unknown person who had refused to vote for Simonis, he was initially considered to have been the so-called "Heide murderer" by some media, which is generally regarded as refuted because Simonis suspected another person and had planned to pass her office on to Stegner after two years. In 2007 he formally succeeded her as he was elected chairman of the Schleswig-Holstein SPD.

When the SPD ministers left the coalition government, which had been in constant dispute over several issues, in 2008, Stegner became SPD candidate for Minister-President in the early 2009 elections. Following their electoral defeat, he became chairman of the party's parliamentary group and thereby leader of the opposition against the Carstensen government. He was unsuccessful in his attempt to become the party's candidate again for the 2012 elections; Mayor of Kiel Torsten Albig was chosen instead and subsequently elected to the office. Stegner chose not to return to a ministerial office in Albig's government and kept the offices of party and parliamentary chairman of the SPD. After Albig's defeat in the 2017 elections, Stegner became leader of the opposition for the second time. In 2019 he was succeeded by Serpil Midyatli in his state party office but remained parliamentary and opposition leader.

=== Role in national politics ===
Stegner was a SPD delegate to the Federal Convention for the purpose of electing the President of Germany in 2009, 2010 and 2012. In the negotiations to form a Grand Coalition of Chancellor Angela Merkel's Christian Democrats (CDU together with the Bavarian CSU) and the SPD following the 2013 federal elections, he was part of the SPD delegation in the working group on education and research policy, led by Johanna Wanka and Doris Ahnen.

At the SPD national convention in 2014, party chairman Sigmar Gabriel nominated Stegner as one of his six deputies, alongside Hannelore Kraft, Olaf Scholz, Manuela Schwesig, Thorsten Schäfer-Gümbel and Aydan Özoğuz. In the 2019 SPD leadership election, he announced his intention to run for the position as co-chair in the party's new dual leadership, together with the party's two-time presidential candidate Gesine Schwan. Saskia Esken and Norbert Walter-Borjans won the nomination and Stegner retired from his position of deputy chairman. He was ultimately succeeded by Serpil Midyatli again. In December 2019, Stegner called for a merger between the SPD and The Left.

=== Member of the German Parliament, 2021–present ===
Since the 2021 elections, Stegner has been a member of the German Bundestag, representing the Pinneberg district. In parliament, he has since been serving on the Committee on Foreign Affairs and its Subcommittee on Disarmament, Arms Control and Non-Proliferation. From 2022 to 2025, he was also a member of the Parliamentary Oversight Panel (PKGr), which provides parliamentary oversight of Germany's intelligence services BND, BfV and MAD.

== Other activities ==
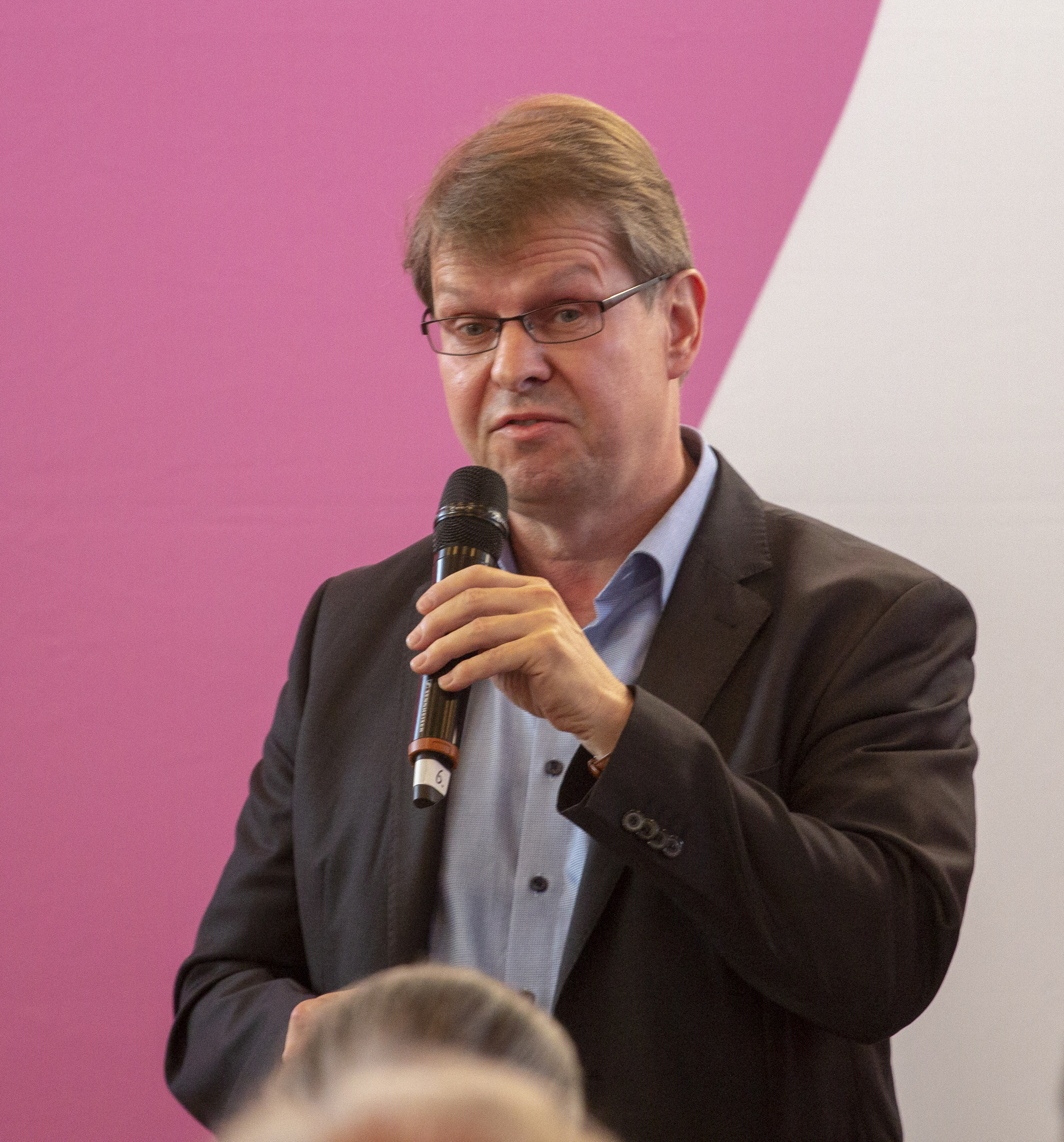
Stegner in 2019

=== Corporate boards ===
- HSH Nordbank, Ex-Officio Member of the supervisory board (2005-2008)
- KfW, Member of the Board of Supervisory Directors (-2005)

=== Non-profit organizations ===
- Federal Academy for Security Policy (BAKS), Member of the advisory board (since 2022)
- Friedrich Ebert Foundation, Member of the Board of Trustees
- German United Services Trade Union (ver.di), Member

== Personal life ==
Stegner is married, and has three children.
