= Simone Lange =

German politician

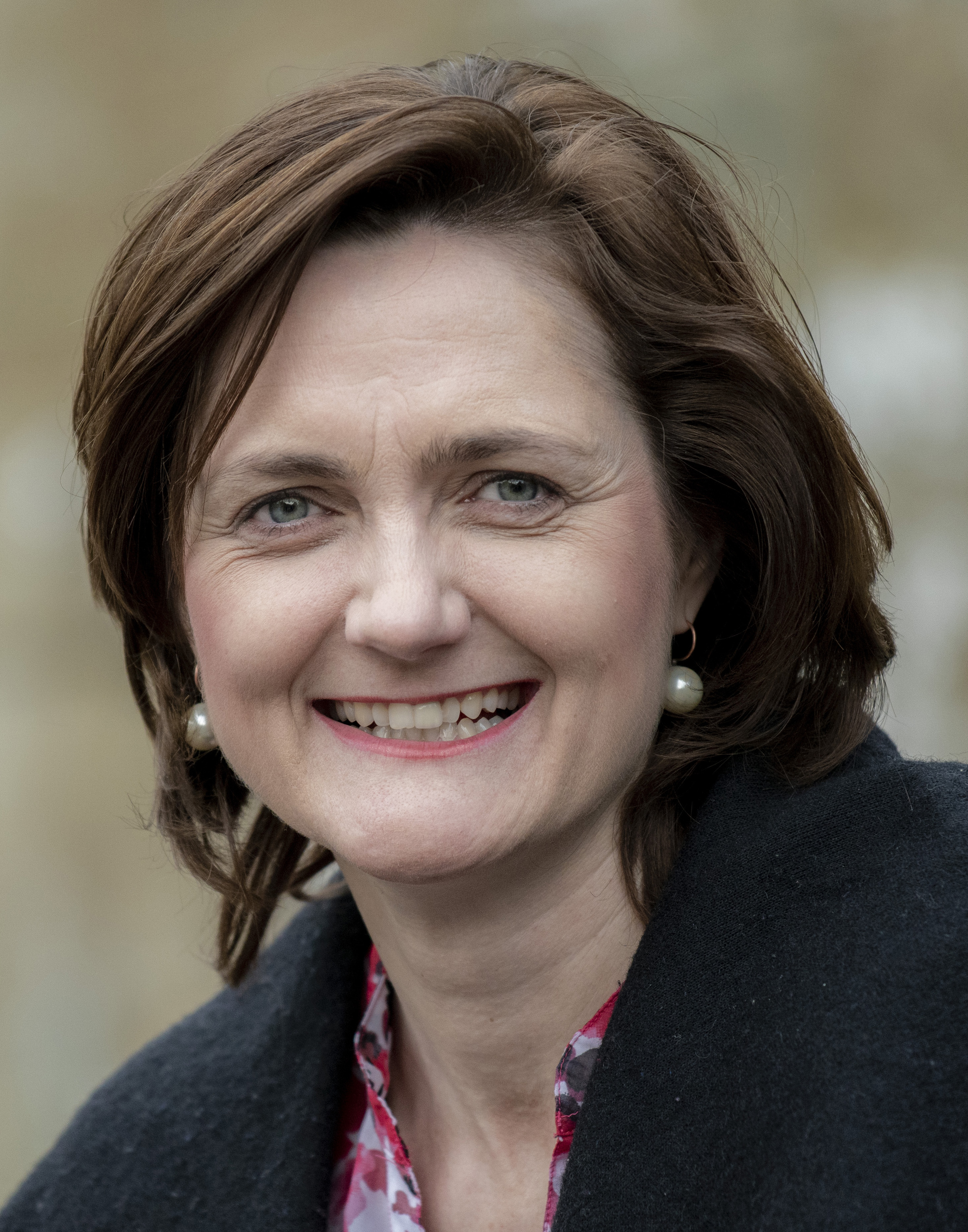
- Lange in 2018

Mayor of Flensburg
- Incumbent
- Assumed office 15 January 2017
- Preceded by: Simon Faber

Member of the Landtag of Schleswig-Holstein for Flensburg
- In office 6 May 2012 – 15 January 2017
- Preceded by: Susanne Herold
- Succeeded by: Heiner Dunckel

Personal details
- Born: 24 October 1976 (age 50) Rudolstadt, Bezirk Gera, East Germany

Simone Lange (born 24 October 1976) is a German politician of the Social Democratic Party (SPD) who served as Mayor of Flensburg from 2017 to 2023.

== Early life and career ==
Lange grew up in Rudolstadt and completed her Abitur in 1995. After completing a polytechnic degree in 1998 (Dipl.-Verwaltungsfachwirtin (police division)), she was employed at the criminal investigation department in Flensburg from 1999 until 2012.

== Political career ==
Lange joined the Social Democratic Party (SPD) in 2003 and held multiple positions in the party. She was part of the Flensburg council from 2008 until 2012. She was a direct candidate for the Schleswig-Holstein state election in 2012.

On the day of the election, she won against the former district representative Susanne Herold of the Christian Democratic Union and was directly elected into the Landtag of Schleswig-Holstein.

In the SPD faction of the Schleswig-Holstein Landtag, she was spokesperson for police policy and equality.

She held the position of acting chair of the select committee for home and legal affairs and acting member of the social and health select committee. During her political tenure, she took a stand for labelling requirements of police officers and the introduction of a police representative.

On 28 July 2015, it was announced that Lange would run against incumbent Simon Faber of the South Schleswig Voters' Association for the 2016 Flensburg mayor elections.

During the election on 5 June 2016, Lange won during the first ballot and received 51.4% of the votes. Faber received 22.8% of the votes, according to the official election results.

Lange took office as mayor of Flensburg in January 2017.

In February 2018, she stood for the leadership of the SPD. She was defeated at the party conference - which was held in Wiesbaden on 22 April 2018 - by Andrea Nahles, winning 27% of the vote to Nahles's 66%. In the 2019 SPD leadership election, she announced her intention to run for the position again, this time together with Alexander Ahrens; shortly after, both withdrew their candidacies and instead endorsed Norbert Walter-Borjans and Saskia Esken.

== Other activities ==
=== Corporate boards ===
- Nord-Ostsee Sparkasse, Ex-Officio Member of the Supervisory Board

=== Non-profit organizations ===
- Nikolaus Reiser Foundation, Ex-Officio Member of the Board
- Trade Union of the Police (GdP), Member
