= Klara Geywitz =

German politician (born 1976)

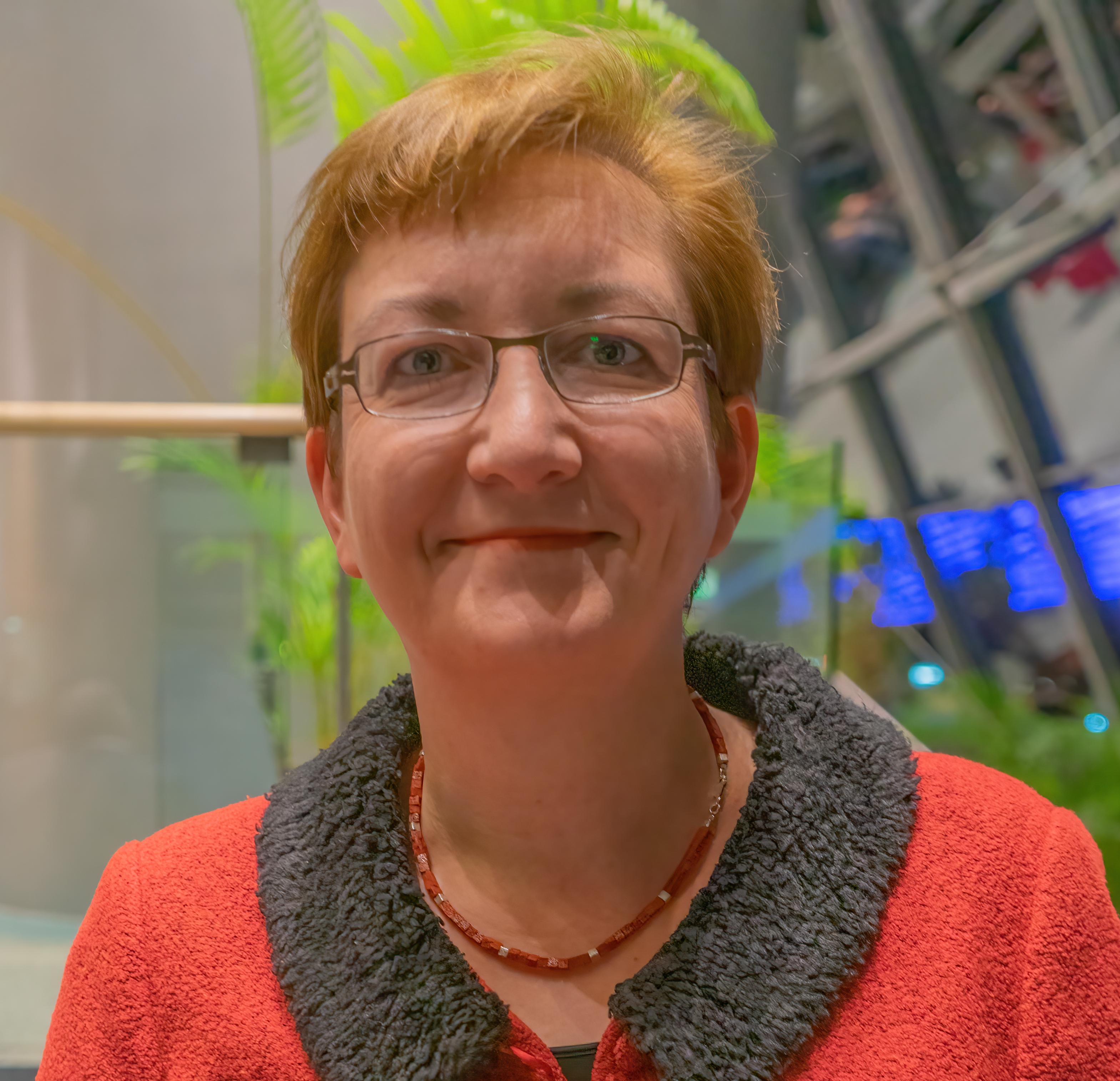
- Geywitz in 2020

Minister for Housing, Urban Development and Building
- In office 8 December 2021 – 6 May 2025
- Chancellor: Olaf Scholz
- Preceded by: Horst Seehofer (as Minister of the Interior, Building and Community)

Deputy Leader of the Social Democratic Party
- Incumbent
- Assumed office 6 December 2019 Serving with Serpil Midyatli, Anke Rehlinger, Thomas Kutschaty, Hubertus Heil
- Leader: Saskia Esken; Lars Klingbeil
- Preceded by: Natascha Kohnen

General Secretary of the Social Democratic Party of Brandenburg
- In office 2 September 2013 – 1 November 2017
- Leader: Dietmar Woidke
- Preceded by: Klaus Ness
- Succeeded by: Erik Stohn

Member of the Landtag of Brandenburg for Potsdam I
- In office 13 October 2004 – 25 September 2019
- Preceded by: Herbert Knoblich
- Succeeded by: Marie Schäffer

Personal details
- Born: 18 February 1976 (age 50) Potsdam, Bezirk Potsdam, East Germany (now Germany)
- Party: SPD (since 1992)
- Spouse: Ulrich Deupmann
- Children: 3
- Education: University of Potsdam
- Occupation: Politician; Political Scientist; Political Staffer
- Website: Official party website

Klara Geywitz (German pronunciation: [ˈklaːʁa ˈɡaɪvɪts]; born 18 February 1976) is a German politician of the Social Democratic Party of Germany (SPD). She served as Federal Minister for Housing, Urban Development and Building in the Scholz cabinet from 2021 to 2025. She served as member of the Landtag of Brandenburg from 2004 until 2019, and is a Deputy Leader of the SPD since 2019.

== Early life and education ==
Klara Geywitz was born 1976 in Potsdam in the former German Democratic Republic. She studied political science at the University of Potsdam. In 1992, Geywitz became a member of the Social Democratic Party of Germany.

== Political career ==
From 2004 until 2019, Geywitz was a member of the Landtag of Brandenburg. Among other committee assignments, she served on the Budget Committee from 2009 until 2014. She was always elected in First-past-the-post voting for her electoral district in Potsdam, until she was defeated in the 2019 state election by Greens candidate Marie Schäffer.

From 2008 until 2013, Geywitz served as deputy chairwoman of the SPD in Brandenburg, under the leadership of its chairman Matthias Platzeck. From 2013 until 2017, she was the party's Secretary General, this time under chairman Dietmar Woidke.

In the negotiations to form a fourth cabinet under Chancellor Angela Merkel following the 2017 elections, Geywitz was part of her party's delegation.

In the 2019 SPD leadership election, Geywitz announced that she would run as co-chair, together with incumbent Vice Chancellor Olaf Scholz. They were representative of the party establishment. Competing against five other candidate pairs, they narrowly won the first voting round, gaining 22 per cent of the vote. In the final voting round, she and Scholz were defeated winning 45 per cent of the party base, while Saskia Esken and Norbert Walter-Borjans won with 53 per cent of the vote, drawing support from the youth of the organisation.

At a SPD national convention in 2019, Geywitz was later elected as one of the five deputies of the party's co-chairs Esken and Walter-Borjans. in December 2021, she was re-elected at the SPD national convention .

Since 2020, Geywitz has been working for the Brandenburg Court of Audit.

=== Minister for Housing, Urban Development and Building, 2021–present ===
On 6 December 2021, Geywitz was announced as Federal Minister for Housing, Urban Development and Building in the Scholz cabinet.

In October 2023, Geywitz participated in the first joint cabinet retreat of the German and French governments in Hamburg, chaired by Scholz and President Emmanuel Macron.

== Other activities ==
=== Corporate boards ===
- Deutsche Druck- und Verlagsgesellschaft (DDVG), Member of the Supervisory Board

=== Non-profit organizations ===
- German Poland Institute (DPI), Member of the Board of Trustees (since 2022)
- Foundation for Polish-German Cooperation, Member of the Board
- Leo Baeck Foundation, Member of the Board of Trustees

== Political positions ==
In 2020, following Thomas Oppermann’s death, Geywitz endorsed Dagmar Ziegler as his successor in the office of Vice-President of the German Bundestag.

== Personal life ==
Geywitz is married and has three children.
