= Leader of the Social Democratic Party of Germany =

Leader of the Social Democratic Party
- Vorsitzender der Sozialdemokratischen Partei Deutschlands

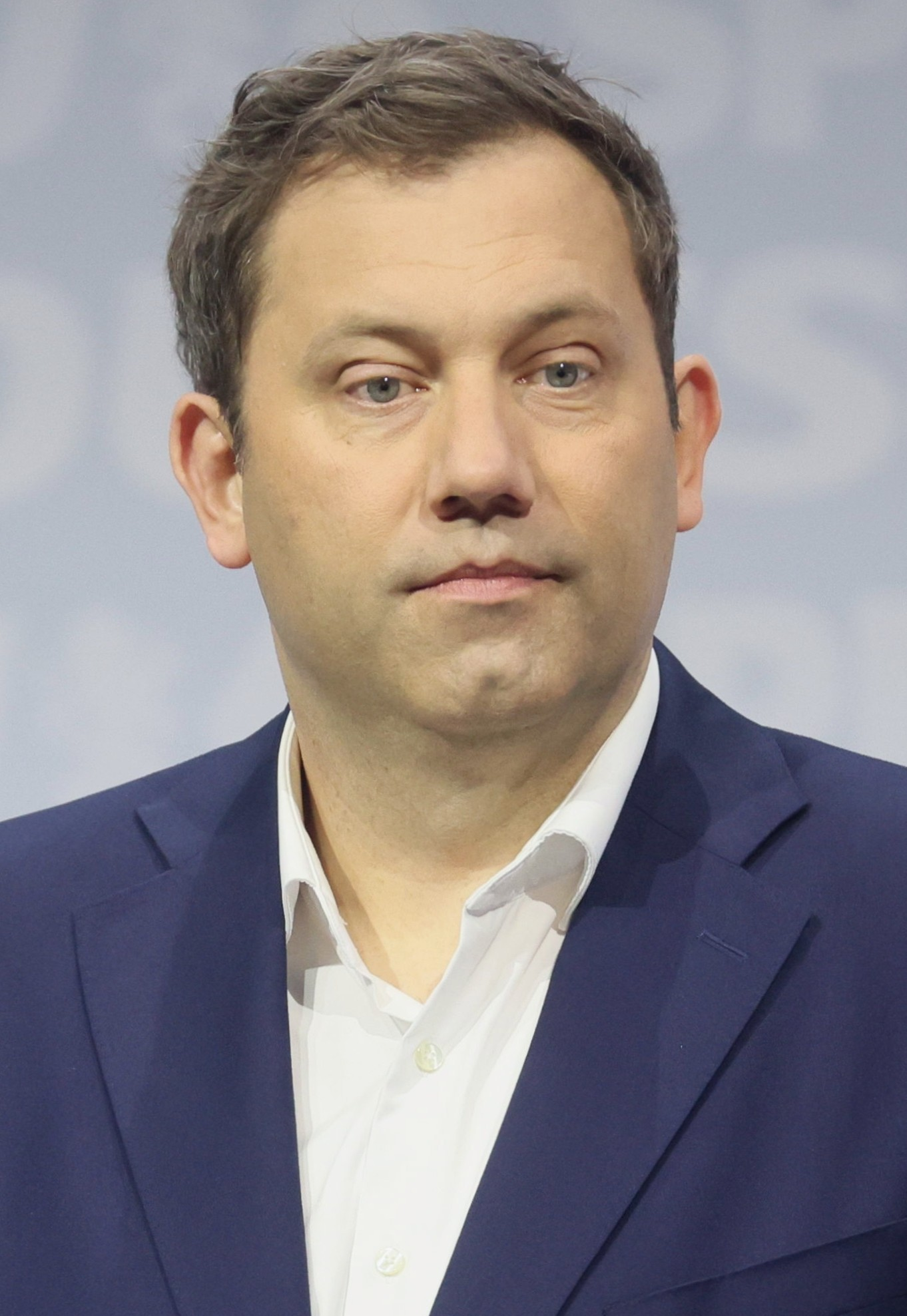
- Incumbent; Lars Klingbeil since 12 October 2026
- Member of: Federal Executive; Federal Presidium
- Inaugural holder: Paul Singer
- Formation: 1890
- Deputy: Petra Köpping; Serpil Midyatli; Achim Post; Anke Rehlinger; Alexander Schweitzer

The Leader of the Social Democratic Party (Vorsitzender der Sozialdemokratischen Partei Deutschlands) is the most senior political figure within the Social Democratic Party of Germany. Since 12 October 2026, the office has been held by Lars Klingbeil.

The Leader of the Social Democratic Party is supported by five deputy leaders, which currently are Petra Köpping, Serpil Midyatli, Achim Post, Anke Rehlinger and Alexander Schweitzer. The party's administration is headed by a General Secretary, which since May 2025 has been Tim Klüssendorf.

== Selection ==
The Leader of Social Democratic Party is elected by Party conferences, usually with around 600 delegates representing all the state and local party chapters. To stand as leader, a candidate needs to be nominated by 90 "Ortsvereine", local chapters. It is unusual for more than one person to be nominated as party leader, as the decision who becomes leader is usually made behind the scenes within the Presidium and Federal Executive. This has drawn hefty criticism, so much so that in the last leadership election in April 2018, Simone Lange challenged Andrea Nahles, the candidate nominated by the Federal Executive. This challenge, in German called "Kampfabstimmung" has only happened twice before; once in 1993 and once in 1995.

== Chairmen of the Social Democratic Party (1949–present) ==
A list of leaders (including acting leaders) since 1949.

Portrait	Name (Born–Died)	Term of office			State	Chancellor
Portrait	Name (Born–Died)	Took office	Left office	Days	State	Chancellor
1	Kurt Schumacher (1895–1952)	11 May 1946	20 August 1952 (died in office)	6 years, 101 days	Lower Saxony	Konrad Adenauer
2	Erich Ollenhauer (1901–1963)	27 September 1952	14 December 1963 (died in office)	11 years, 78 days	North Rhine-Westphalia	Konrad Adenauer; Ludwig Erhard
3	Willy Brandt (1913–1992)	16 February 1964	14 June 1987	23 years, 118 days	Berlin	Ludwig Erhard; Kurt Georg Kiesinger; Himself; Helmut Schmidt; Helmut Kohl
4	Hans-Jochen Vogel (1926–2020)	14 June 1987	29 May 1991	3 years, 349 days	Bavaria	Helmut Kohl
5	Björn Engholm (born 1939)	29 May 1991	5 May 1993 (resigned)	1 year, 341 days	Schleswig-Holstein	Helmut Kohl
Acting	Johannes Rau (1931–2006)	5 May 1993	25 June 1993	51 days	North Rhine-Westphalia	Helmut Kohl
6	Rudolf Scharping (born 1947)	25 June 1993	16 November 1995	2 years, 144 days	Rhineland-Palatinate	Helmut Kohl
7	Oskar Lafontaine (born 1943)	16 November 1995	12 March 1999 (resigned)	3 years, 116 days	Saarland	Helmut Kohl; Gerhard Schröder
8	Gerhard Schröder (born 1944)	12 March 1999	21 July 2004	5 years, 131 days	Lower Saxony	Himself
9	Franz Müntefering (born 1940)	21 July 2004	15 March 2005 (resigned)	237 days	North Rhine-Westphalia	Gerhard Schröder
10	Matthias Platzeck (born 1953)	15 March 2005	10 April 2006 (resigned)	1 year, 26 days	Brandenburg	Gerhard Schröder; Angela Merkel
11	Kurt Beck (born 1949)	10 April 2006	7 September 2008 (resigned)	2 years, 150 days	Rhineland-Palatinate	Angela Merkel
Acting	Frank-Walter Steinmeier (born 1956)	7 September 2008	18 October 2008	41 days	Lower Saxony	Angela Merkel
12 (9)	Franz Müntefering (born 1940)	18 October 2008	13 November 2009	1 year, 26 days	North Rhine-Westphalia	Angela Merkel
13	Sigmar Gabriel (born 1959)	13 November 2009	19 March 2017	7 years, 126 days	Lower Saxony	Angela Merkel
14	Martin Schulz (born 1955)	19 March 2017	13 February 2018 (resigned)	331 days	North Rhine-Westphalia	Angela Merkel
Acting	Olaf Scholz (born 1958)	13 February 2018	22 April 2018	68 days	Hamburg	Angela Merkel
15	Andrea Nahles (born 1970)	22 April 2018	3 June 2019 (resigned)	1 year, 42 days	Rhineland-Palatinate	Angela Merkel
Acting	Manuela Schwesig (born 1974)	3 June 2019	10 September 2019 (resigned)	99 days	Mecklenburg-Vorpommern	Angela Merkel
Acting	Thorsten Schäfer-Gümbel (born 1969)	3 June 2019	1 October 2019 (resigned)	120 days	Hesse	Angela Merkel
Acting	Malu Dreyer (born 1961)	3 June 2019	6 December 2019	186 days	Rhineland-Palatinate	Angela Merkel
16	Norbert Walter-Borjans (born 1952)	6 December 2019	11 December 2021	2 years, 5 days	North Rhine-Westphalia	Angela Merkel; Olaf Scholz
16	Saskia Esken (born 1961)	6 December 2019	21 December 2021	5 years, 203 days	Baden-Württemberg	Angela Merkel; Olaf Scholz
17	Saskia Esken (born 1961)	21 December 2021	27 June 2025	5 years, 203 days	Baden-Württemberg	Angela Merkel; Olaf Scholz
17	Lars Klingbeil (born 1978)	11 December 2021	27 June 2025	4 years, 340 days	Lower Saxony	Olaf Scholz; Friedrich Merz
18	Lars Klingbeil (born 1978)	27 June 2025	Incumbent	4 years, 340 days	Lower Saxony	Olaf Scholz; Friedrich Merz
18	Bärbel Bas (born 1968)	27 June 2025	12 October 2026	1 year, 107 days	North Rhine-Westphalia	Friedrich Merz

== See also ==
- History of the Social Democratic Party of Germany
