= Andrea Nahles =

German politician (born 1970)

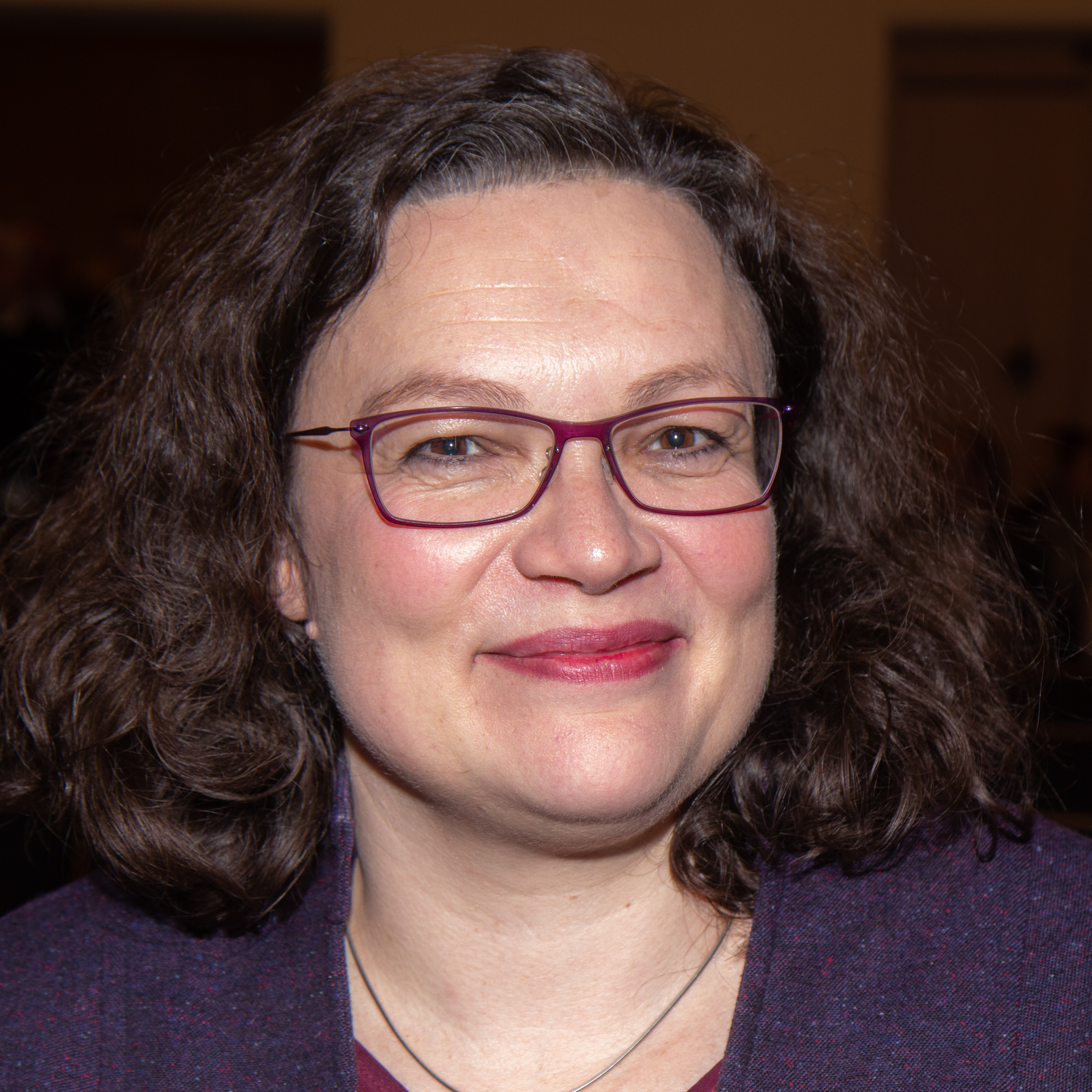
- Nahles in 2019

Leader of the Social Democratic Party
- In office 22 April 2018 – 3 June 2019
- General Secretary: Lars Klingbeil
- Deputy: Manuela Schwesig; Natascha Kohnen; Malu Dreyer; Thorsten Schäfer-Gümbel; Ralf Stegner; Olaf Scholz
- Preceded by: Martin Schulz
- Succeeded by: Malu Dreyer (Acting); Manuela Schwesig (Acting); Thorsten Schäfer-Gümbel (Acting); Norbert Walter-Borjans & Saskia Esken (Elected)

Leader of the Social Democratic Party in the Bundestag
- In office 27 September 2017 – 4 June 2019
- Chief Whip: Carsten Schneider
- Preceded by: Thomas Oppermann
- Succeeded by: Rolf Mützenich (Acting)

Minister of Labour and Social Affairs
- In office 17 December 2013 – 27 September 2017
- Chancellor: Angela Merkel
- Preceded by: Ursula von der Leyen
- Succeeded by: Katarina Barley (Acting)

General Secretary of the Social Democratic Party
- In office 13 November 2009 – 26 January 2014
- Leader: Sigmar Gabriel
- Preceded by: Hubertus Heil
- Succeeded by: Yasmin Fahimi

Deputy Leader of the Social Democratic Party
- In office 26 October 2007 – 12 November 2009
- Leader: Kurt Beck; Frank-Walter Steinmeier (Acting); Franz Müntefering
- Preceded by: Kurt Beck
- Succeeded by: Hannelore Kraft

Member of the Bundestag for Rhineland-Palatinate
- In office 18 September 2005 – 1 November 2019
- Succeeded by: Joe Weingarten
- In office 27 September 1998 – 22 September 2002

Personal details
- Born: Andrea Maria Nahles; 20 June 1970 (age 56) Mendig, West Germany
- Party: Social Democratic Party
- Spouse: Marcus Frings (divorced)
- Children: 1
- Education: University of Bonn
- Website: andrea-nahles.de

Andrea Maria Nahles (born 20 June 1970) is a former German politician who has been the director of the Federal Employment Agency (BA) since 2022.

Nahles is best known for having served as leader of the Social Democratic Party (SPD) from April 2018 until June 2019 and the leader of the SPD in the Bundestag from September 2017 until June 2019. She served as a Federal Minister of Labour and Social Affairs from 2013 to 2017 and SPD Youth leader. From 2020 to 2022, she was the president of the Federal Posts and Telecommunications Agency.

Nahles is known within the party for criticising Gerhard Schröder's Agenda 2010. In June 2019, in the aftermath of the SPD's result in the 2019 European elections, she announced her resignation as leader of the SPD and as parliamentary leader of the SPD. For the transition period until a new SPD-leader was elected, Manuela Schwesig, Malu Dreyer and Thorsten Schäfer-Gümbel acted as her successors. Nahles left the Bundestag on 31 October 2019.

== Early life and education ==
Born in 1970 in Mendig, Rhineland-Palatinate, to a bricklayer and an office clerk, Nahles grew up in the rural Eifel region in West Germany. She finished high school (Abitur) through a continuing education program in 1989. She obtained an MA after studying politics, philosophy and German studies at the University of Bonn for 20 semesters (10 years), during which time she was an assistant to a member of parliament.

In 2004, Nahles began working towards a doctorate in Germanistics. She abandoned her dissertation in 2005 when she returned to the Bundestag. The title of her planned dissertation was "Walter Scott's influence on the development of the historical novel in Germany".

== Political career ==
=== Party career ===
In 1988, Nahles joined the SPD at the age of 18. Shortly after, she was the youth representative for the constituency of Mayen-Koblenz. From 1993 to 1995 she was the youth representative for Rhineland-Palatinate. In 1995 she became the national youth representative, following Thomas Westphal, a post she held until 1999. Since 1997 she has been a member of the SPD executive.

In 2000, Nahles was one of the founders of the "Forum Demokratische Linke 21" (Forum of the Democratic Left 21). As leader of the SPD's left wing and former head of party's youth section, she opposed many of Chancellor Gerhard Schröder's economic reforms, namely the Agenda 2010. She and others repeatedly criticized the leadership style of the party's chairman Franz Müntefering, saying the party was never consulted over Schröder's decision in May 2005 to call early elections or the decision to join a grand coalition under Merkel that would include the major parties.

As party leaders sought to reconcile the bickering factions in the post-Schröder era, Nahles gained in leverage. On 31 October 2005, she was voted the SPD's general secretary, defeating Kajo Wasserhövel, the favoured man from the conservative side of the party. Wasserhövel's defeat prompted Franz Müntefering to declare that he no longer felt he had the confidence of the party and would step down. As a result, Nahles refused to accept the position of general secretary.

Between 2005 and 2009, Nahles served on the Committee on Labour and Social Affairs. From 2008, she was also a member of the SPD parliamentary group's leadership under chairman Peter Struck.

Ahead of the 2009 elections, German foreign minister Frank-Walter Steinmeier included her in his shadow cabinet of 10 women and eight men for the Social Democrats' campaign to unseat incumbent Angela Merkel as chancellor. During the campaign, Nahles served as shadow minister for education and integration policies, being a counterweight to incumbent Annette Schavan.

=== General Secretary of the SPD, 2009–2013 ===
Nahles was elected as the SPD's secretary general in November 2009 at the party congress held in Dresden. She succeeded Hubertus Heil in the position, and worked together with new-elected party leader Sigmar Gabriel. Her appointment was widely seen as a signal the SPD would shift to the left.

In her capacity as secretary general, Nahles oversaw the SPD's electoral campaign in 2013. After the SPD's defeat in the federal elections, she was in charge of organizing a referendum among her party's 472,000 members before signing any coalition treaty with re-elected Chancellor Angela Merkel and her conservative bloc. In the negotiations to form a coalition government following the elections, Nahles was part of the 15-member leadership circle chaired by Merkel, Gabriel and Horst Seehofer.

At a three-day party convention held in Leipzig in November 2013, delegates re-elected Nahles to her post with reduced majority. She received 67.2 percent of members' ballots.

=== Federal Minister of Labour and Social Affairs, 2013–2017 ===
As Federal Minister of Labour and Social Affairs in Chancellor Angela Merkel's third Cabinet, Nahles has overseen the introduction of a national minimum wage for Germany, guaranteeing workers at least 8.50 euros per hour ($11.75). Merkel had campaigned against a statutory minimum wage in 2013, saying it would threaten Germany's competitive edge and that wage-setting belonged in the hands of companies and employees; however, her party gave ground to the Social Democrats, who made the measure a condition for helping her stay in power for a third term. In early 2015, however, Nahles bowed to pressure from Germany's eastern neighbours, particularly Poland, and suspended controls by state authorities to check whether foreign truck drivers were being paid the minimum wage.

After having campaigned on the promise of early retirement for longtime workers during the elections, Nahles also managed the introduction of an early retirement law in 2014. The move, which – at expected total costs of about 160 billion euros between 2015 and 2030 – is likely to be the most expensive single measure of the legislative period, was sharply criticized as Germany grapples with an aging population and a shrinking work force and promotes austerity among its European Union neighbors. In late 2014, Nahles also announced that the combined pension contributions from employers and employees would be cut by a total of 2 billion euros in 2015 due to the high level of reserves.

Following annual negotiations between the Claims Conference and the German government in 2014, Nahles successfully introduced a proposal for extending German pension payments totaling 340 million euros ($461 million) for some 40,000 Holocaust survivors who were used by the Nazis in ghettos as laborers in exchange for food or meager wages. Most Holocaust survivors suffered serious malnutrition during World War II and also lost almost all of their relatives, leaving them with many medical problems and little or no family support network to help them cope.

Following a succession of strikes that disrupted Germany's air and train travel in 2014, Nahles introduced a bill which amended labor laws to allow only one trade union to represent employees of one company in negotiating wage agreements, a move critics say in effect will deprive small unions of their right to strike.

In 2015, Nahles commissioned an in-depth study to establish a definition of work-related stress and calculate its economic cost, leading to speculation that the study could pave the way for an "anti-stress act" as proposed by Germany's metalworkers' union.

In response to rightwing populist assaults on chancellor Angela Merkel's liberal immigration policies, Nahles presented plans in early 2016 to ban EU migrants from most unemployment benefits for five years after their arrival.

=== Leader of SPD in Bundestag, 2017–2019 ===
After the Social Democrats experienced their worst result in German post-war history in the 2017 elections, their chairman Martin Schulz nominated Nahles to lead the party's group in the German Parliament. She replaced Thomas Oppermann and was the first woman to serve in this role. In the negotiations to form a fourth coalition government under Merkel, Nahles led the working group on social affairs, alongside Barbara Stamm and Karl-Josef Laumann.

In addition to her role as chairwoman, Nahles also joined the Committee on the Election of Judges (Wahlausschuss), which is in charge of appointing judges to the Federal Constitutional Court of Germany.

=== Leader of the Social Democratic Party, 2018–2019 ===
Nahles was elected as the first ever female leader of the Social Democratic Party on 22 April 2018 at the party convention in Wiesbaden. She won the election with 414 delegate votes, against her opponent Simone Lange, who received 172 delegate votes, which worked out as 66% to 27% respectively. She succeeded Olaf Scholz who was acting leader for two months after the resignation of Martin Schulz who led the party to their worst election result since 1933. Nahles was the first female leader of the party in its 155-year history. Furthermore, this was the first time ever in German history that the country's two largest parties were led by women, the other being CDU with its leader Angela Merkel.

Nahles was widely credited with stewarding the party toward another coalition government with Merkel's Christian Democrats.

On 2 June 2019, Nahles announced that she would resign as SPD leader in the face of personal unpopularity, a major defeat for the SPD in the 2019 European Parliament election, and a record low result in the Forsa poll of 1 June 2019. She stated she would also resign as leader of the SPD parliamentary group in the Bundestag.

== Life after politics ==
From July 2020, Nahles served as a special advisor to European Commissioner for Jobs and Social Rights Nicolas Schmit.

From 2020 to 2022, Nahles served as president of the Federal Posts and Telecommunications Agency in Bonn. In addition, she taught at the NRW School of Governance of the University of Duisburg-Essen.

In 2022, Nahles was nominated as director of the Federal Employment Agency (BA).

== Other activities ==
- Baden-Badener Unternehmer-Gespräche (BBUG), Member of the Board of Trustees (since 2022)
- Central Committee of German Catholics, Member
- Denkwerk Demokratie, Member of the Advisory Board
- Hermann Kunst Foundation for the Promotion of New Testament Textual Research, Member of the Board of Trustees
- Maria Laach Abbey, Member of the Board of Trustees
- Willy Brandt Center Jerusalem, Member of the Board of Trustees
- spw – Zeitschrift für sozialistische Politik und Wirtschaft, Member of the Editorial Board
- IG Metall, Member
- Eurosolar, Member
- Attac, Member
- ZDF, Ex-officio Member of the Television Board (2000–2004)

== Political positions ==
Once a prominent figure on the SPD's left, Nahles has moved steadily towards the centre. She is known as a provocative and occasionally brusque orator.

== Personal life ==
Nahles' partner was VW manager Horst Neumann from 1997 until 2007. From 2010, she was married to art historian Marcus Frings with whom she has one daughter, born in January 2011. In January 2016 the couple announced their separation.

Nahles lives in the village of Weiler, where she was born. A Roman Catholic, she attends Sunday mass in the village regularly. She resides on a farm that belonged to her great-grandparents. Since 2017, she has an apartment in Berlin's Moabit district.

Nahles enjoys horse riding. Until an accident in 1986, she also was a track and field athlete.

== See also ==
- Politics of Germany

Party political offices
| Preceded by Hubertus Heil | Secretary General of the Social Democratic Party; 2009–2014 | Succeeded by Yasmin Fahimi |
| Preceded by Thomas Oppermann | Leader of the Social Democratic Party in the Bundestag; 2017–2019 | Succeeded by Rolf Mützenich; Acting |
| Preceded by Olaf Scholz; Acting | Leader of the Social Democratic Party; 2018–2019 | Succeeded by Malu Dreyer; Manuela Schwesig; Thorsten Schäfer-Gümbel; Acting |
Political offices
| Preceded by Ursula von der Leyen | Minister of Labour and Social Affairs; 2013–2017 | Succeeded by Katarina Barley; Acting |
