= Karl-Heinz Brunner =

German politician

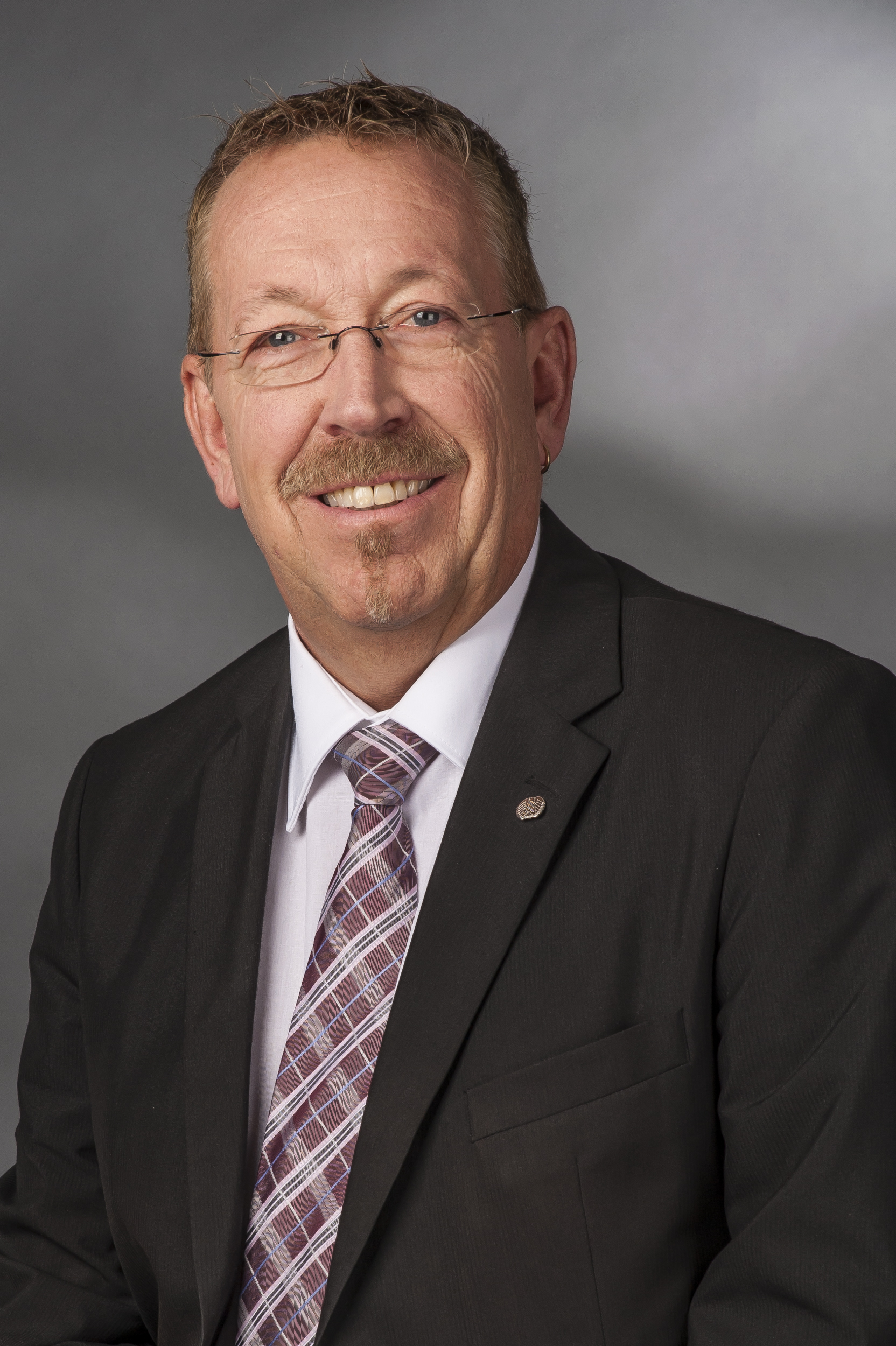

Member of the Bundestag
- In office 2013–2021

Personal details
- Born: 14 March 1953 (age 73) Munich, Bavaria, West Germany (now Germany)
- Citizenship: German
- Party: German: Social Democratic Party; EU: Party of European Socialists

Karl-Heinz Brunner (born 14 March 1953) is a German politician of the Social Democratic Party of Germany (SPD). He was elected a member of the German parliament (Bundestag) in the federal election of 2013 until October 2021.

== Life ==
Brunner was born in Munich. After finishing school, he studied business administration, law administration, and management in Reutlingen, Munich, Starnberg and Bratislava. He worked as a legal counselor from 2005 – 2013 and as an executive shareholder of the Illertisser Sonnenschein GmbH & Co. KG. He is a coeditor of the political magazine “Berliner Republik” and serves as chairman of the “Freundeskreis Illertissen – Loket”. He is an honorary member of the Bavarian Red Cross since 1970 and the Workers’ Welfare Organisation. Brunner is married and has two adult children. Since 2011 he is a lecturer for “Public Private Partnerships” at the University of Applied Sciences Biberach.

In September 2020, Brunner came out as gay. According to him, he and his partner have been living in Berlin since 2019 despite Brunner still being married to his wife.

== Political career ==
Brunner joined the SPD in 1982. He is engaged with local politics since 1985. He was mayor of Illertissen from 1990 to 2002 and is a member of the county counsel of Neu-Ulm since 1996.

He ran for the constituency seat of Neu-Ulm / Günzburg in 2009 and 2013. In 2013 he obtained a seat via the Bavarian SPD party list.

=== Member of the German Bundestag, 2013–present ===
Brunner has been a Member of the German Bundestag since the 2013 federal elections. He has since been serving on the Defence Committee, the Committee on Legal Affairs and Consumer Protection, as well as an on the Subcommittee on Disarmament, Arms Control and Non-Proliferation.

On the Defence Committee, Brunner serves as the rapporteur of his parliamentary group for the German Air Force. In his capacity as member of the committee, he has traveled extensively to visit Bundeswehr troops on their missions abroad, including the Resolute Support Mission forces at Camp Marmal in Mazar-i-Sharif, Afghanistan (2018). He is also spokesman for defense of the Bundestag group of the SPD parliamentarians from Bavaria.

On the Committee on Legal Affairs and Consumer Protection, Brunner is his parliamentary group's rapporteur for bankruptcy law and LGBT rights. In addition to his committee assignments, he serves as vice-chairman of the German-Austrian Parliamentary Friendship Group.

Within his parliamentary group, Brunner belongs to the more centrist Seeheim Circle. He is also a member of the Social Democratic Party of Austria and the Czech Social Democratic Party.

As a member of the German delegation to the NATO Parliamentary Assembly, Brunner joined the election observation mission for the 25 May 2014 early presidential election in Ukraine during the war in Donbas. While in Ukraine, he also met with representatives of the local LGBT community.

In the 2019 SPD leadership election, Brunner qualified as one of the candidates for the position of the party’s chairman, but withdrew from the election on September 16 because he wanted to enable a clearer electoral decision for his fellow party members.

Though Brunner had previously said he would not be running for a seat in the Bundestag for a third time, he announced that he will do so for the 2021 German federal election.

== Other activities ==
- Magnus Hirschfeld Foundation, Member of the Board of Trustees (since 2019)
- Deutsche Härtefallstiftung, Member of the Board of Trustees
- German Military Reserve Association, Vice-President
- Czech Social Democratic Party (ČSSD), Member
- Social Democratic Party of Austria (SPÖ), Member
- German Association for Prevention of Road Accidents (DVW), Member
- Society for German Shepherd Dogs, Member
