= Julian Barlen =

German politician (born 1980)

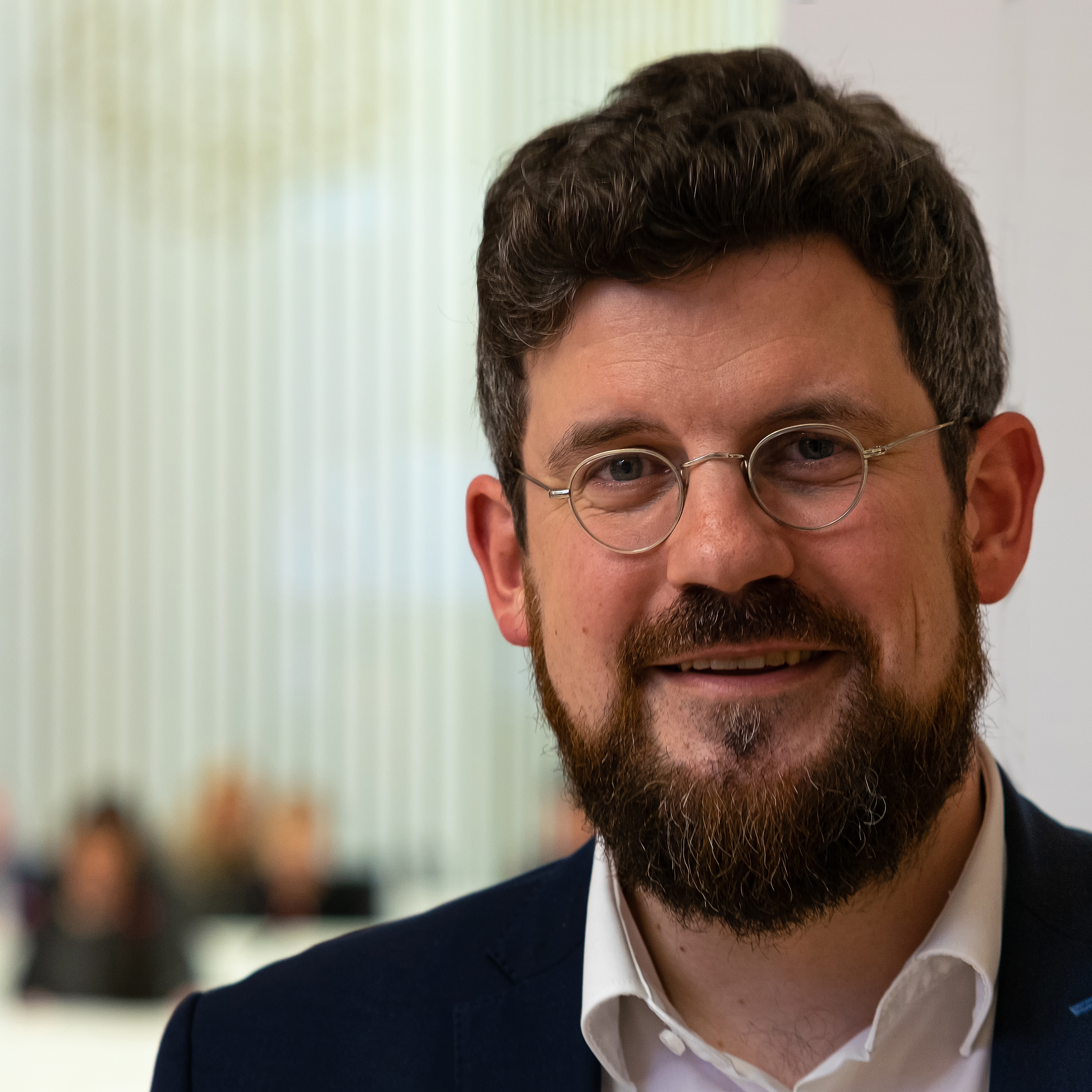
- Barlen in 2020

Member of the Landtag of Mecklenburg-Vorpommern
- Incumbent
- Assumed office 14 May 2019
- Preceded by: Sylvia Bretschneider
- Constituency: Hansestadt Rostock III (2021–present)
- In office 4 October 2011 – 4 October 2016

Personal details
- Born: 24 February 1980 (age 46)
- Party: Social Democratic Party

Julian Barlen (born 24 February 1980) is a German politician. He has been a member of the Landtag of Mecklenburg-Vorpommern since 2019, having previously served from 2011 to 2016. He has served as secretary general of the Social Democratic Party in Mecklenburg-Vorpommern since 2018, and as group leader of the party in the Landtag since 2021.
