= Hubertus Heil =

German politician (born 1972), Federal Minister of Labour and Social Affairs

Hubertus Heil MdB
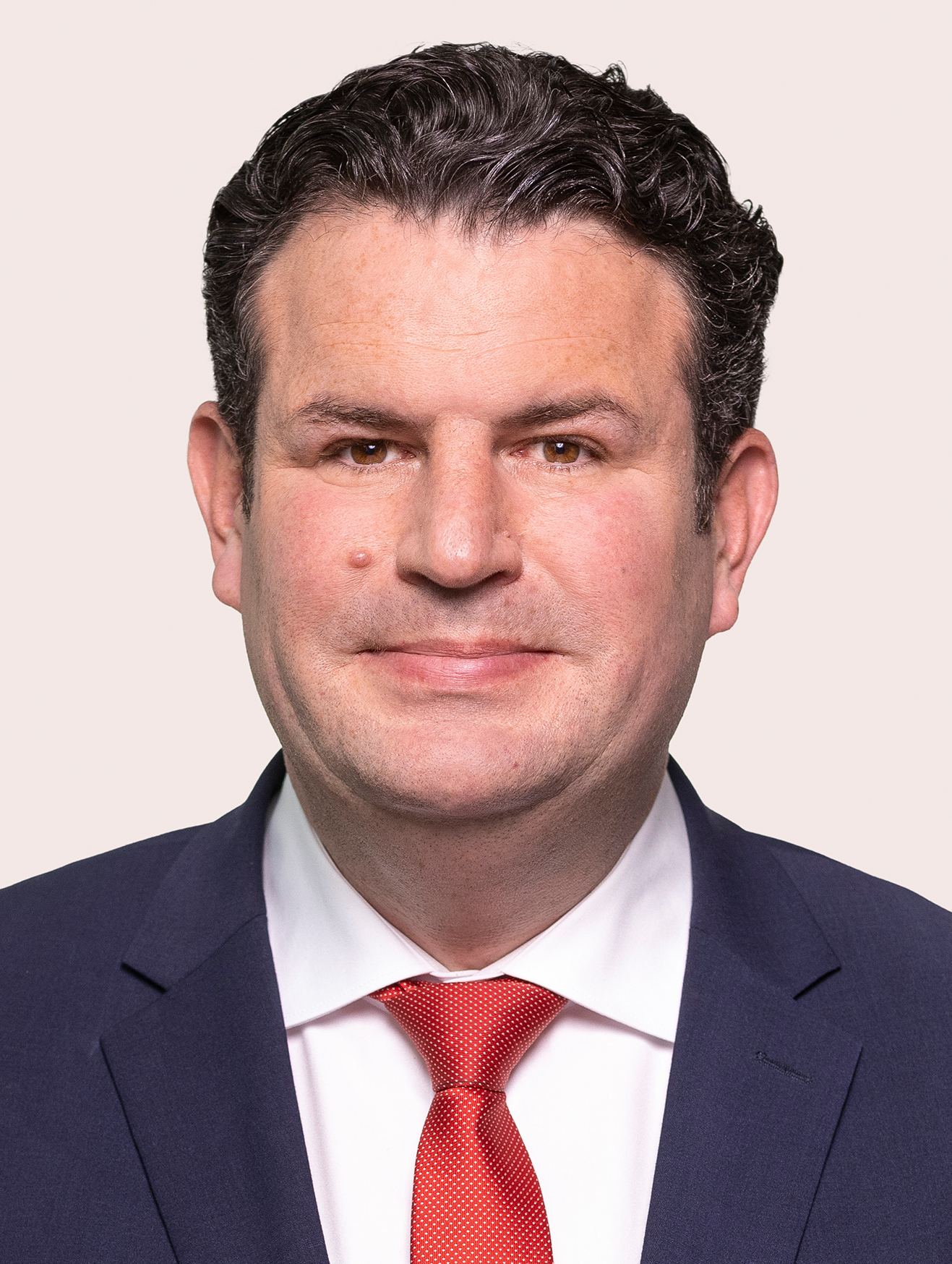
- Heil in 2021

Minister of Labour and Social Affairs
- In office 14 March 2018 – 6 May 2025
- Chancellor: Angela Merkel; Olaf Scholz
- Preceded by: Andrea Nahles; Katarina Barley (acting)
- Succeeded by: Bärbel Bas

Deputy Leader of the Social Democratic Party
- Incumbent
- Assumed office 6 December 2019 Serving with Serpil Midyatli, Anke Rehlinger, Klara Geywitz, Kevin Kühnert
- Leader: Saskia Esken; Norbert Walter-Borjans
- Preceded by: Manuela Schwesig

General Secretary of the Social Democratic Party
- Acting; 2 June 2017 – 8 December 2017
- Leader: Martin Schulz
- Preceded by: Katarina Barley
- Succeeded by: Lars Klingbeil
- In office 15 November 2005 – 13 November 2009
- Leader: Franz Müntefering; Matthias Platzeck; Kurt Beck; Frank-Walter Steinmeier (acting)
- Preceded by: Klaus Uwe Benneter
- Succeeded by: Andrea Nahles

Member of the Bundestag; for Gifhorn – Peine
- Incumbent
- Assumed office 26 October 1998
- Preceded by: Engelbert Nelle

Personal details
- Born: Wolfgang-Hubertus Ernst Ulrich Heil; 3 November 1972 (age 54) Hildesheim, West Germany
- Party: Social Democratic
- Children: 2
- Education: University of Potsdam; University of Hagen

Wolfgang-Hubertus Ernst Ulrich Heil (born 3 November 1972) is a German politician of the Social Democratic Party (SPD) who served as Federal Minister of Labour and Social Affairs in the fourth cabinet of Angela Merkel and the cabinet of Olaf Scholz from 2018 to 2025.

In 2005, Heil became general secretary of the SPD. In September 2009, after immense losses for the SPD during the German federal election, Heil announced his resignation from this position for November. Andrea Nahles succeeded him as general secretary in November 2009. After Katarina Barley's appointment as Federal Minister of Family Affairs, Senior Citizens, Women and Youth, he briefly returned to the office from 2 June to 8 December 2017.

== Early life and career ==
Heil was born in Hildesheim in 1972 as son of a teacher. After graduation in 1992 at the Gymnasium am Silberkamp in Peine, Heil worked for the Alternative civilian service (in German: Zivildienst) and in 1995 he started with his studies in political science and sociology at the University of Potsdam, which he graduated in 2006 at the University of Hagen.

From 1995 to 1997, Heil was the assistant of Heidrun Förster, a member of the Brandenburg State Parliament and in 1998 assistant of Eva Folta, a member of the Bundestag.

== Political career ==
Heil joined the SPD in 1988. At first, he was active at the Jusos and he was their chairman in the district of Braunschweig from 1991 to 1995. From 1995 to 1997 Heil was executive director of the Arbeitsgemeinschaft für Arbeitnehmerfragen, a leftist caucus in the SPD, representing the workers' wing of the party, although he was reputed to belong to the undogmatical reform socialist wing during his Juso time.

Today Heil serves as chairman of the SPD in Braunschweig.

=== Member of the German Bundestag (1998–present) ===
Heil has been a member of the Bundestag since the 1998 German elections, representing the electoral district of Gifhorn-Peine. Between 1998 and 2005, when his party was leading the federal government with Gerhard Schröder, he was a member of the Committee on Economic Affairs. In this capacity, he served as the SPD parliamentary group's spokesperson for telecommunications and postal services from 2003. In addition to his committee assignments, he was a member of the executive board of the SPD parliamentary group under the leadership of chairman Franz Müntefering from 2002 to 2004.

In November 2005 the then designated party leader Matthias Platzeck proposed the relatively unknown Heil as the candidate for the post of secretary general, after Franz Müntefering had resigned as SPD chairman and the initially nominated candidate Andrea Nahles, who had beaten Müntefering's candidate for that position in a vote of the party executive, had withdrawn from her candidacy. At the same time the party was forming a grand coalition government with Angela Merkel's CDU. Heil was elected new secretary general of the SPD, but he received only 61.2 percent of the votes, about 20 percent less than his predecessor Klaus Uwe Benneter. He later served under Platzeck (2005–2006) as well as under his successors Kurt Beck (2006–2008) and Müntefering (2008–2009). During that time, he oversaw the drafting process of the party's Hamburg Program, which has been the party platform since 2007. Following heavy losses in the 2009 federal election and CDU and FDP winning a majority, Heil did not run for the position again.

Between 2009 and 2017, Heil served as deputy chairman of the SPD's parliamentary group, under the leadership of successive chairmen Frank-Walter Steinmeier (2009–2013) and Thomas Oppermann (2013–2017), the first four years in the opposition and the other four as a government party. In this capacity, he was a member of the working groups on energy policy and municipal policy from 2009 until 2013. He was also an advisory member of the Commission for Fundamental Values of the executive committee of the SPD, a body led by Gesine Schwan.

In the negotiations to form a second grand coalition under Chancellor Angela Merkel and return to the government following the 2013 federal elections, Heil led the SPD delegation in the working group on economic affairs; his co-chair from the CDU/CSU was Ilse Aigner. Shortly ahead of the 2017 elections, he was again appointed general secretary on acting basis by Martin Schulz because Katarina Barley left the office to be appointed a federal minister. In that capacity Heil organised the campaign and contributed to the manifesto of Schulz. In the negotiations to form the third grand coalition under Merkel, he led the working group on education policy, alongside Annegret Kramp-Karrenbauer, Stefan Müller and Manuela Schwesig.

=== Minister of Labour and Social Affairs (2018–2025) ===
Since becoming Minister of Labour and Social Affairs when the SPD joined the fourth Merkel cabinet in a grand coalition following the 2017 German federal election, Heil has overseen a number of legal measures to strengthen workers' rights, including a law forcing logistics and eCommerce companies to ensure that their subcontractors pay proper social security contributions for their drivers, and the introduction of a higher basic pension for low-income workers. Amid the COVID-19 pandemic in Germany, he worked on legislation to give employees the right to work from home even when the coronavirus crisis is over.

At a SPD national convention in 2019, Heil was elected as one of the five deputies of the party's co-chairs Saskia Esken and Norbert Walter-Borjans, alongside Klara Geywitz, Kevin Kühnert, Serpil Midyatli and Anke Rehlinger.

Ahead of the 2021 elections, Heil was elected to lead the SPD campaign in Lower Saxony. Following the elections, the SPD took over leadership of the government and new Chancellor Olaf Scholz announced that Heil would stay on as Labour Minister in the new cabinet. Shortly after, he implemented the new government's decision to increase the minimum wage to 12 euros ($13.61) per hour from October 2022 on. He also led efforts to fast-track work permits and visas for several thousand foreign airport workers, mainly from Turkey, to help to ease staffing shortages in the tourism sector after a series of COVID-19 lockdowns.

In October 2023, Heil participated in the first joint cabinet retreat of the German and French governments in Hamburg, chaired by Scholz and President Emmanuel Macron.

Along with Svenja Schulze, Heil was the longest-serving cabinet member by the end of the Scholz government.

=== Candidate for SPD leadership (2026) ===
In November 2026, Heil publicly announced his intention to stand for election as the SPD's co-leader at a party congress in January 2027, without revealing a preference for a leadership partner.

== Political positions ==
In 2012, Heil proposed a special panel in the Federal Chancellery to help overcome professional skill shortages, comprising representatives of industry, unions as well as the federal labor agency and regional and community associations.

== Personal life ==
Heil is Protestant. Heil is married to lawyer Solveig Orlowski, who has managed the Berlin office of the Association of Telecommunications and Value-Added Service Providers (VATM) since 2005. The couple has two children, a son (* 2012) and a daughter (* 2014). His brother Georg Heil is a journalist with public broadcaster Westdeutscher Rundfunk. Georg Heil wird Redaktionsleiter ARD Politikmagazin Kontraste

== Other activities ==
=== Regulatory bodies ===
- Federal Network Agency for Electricity, Gas, Telecommunications, Posts and Railway (BNetzA), Member of the advisory board (2003–2005)

=== Corporate boards ===
- KfW, Member of the Board of Supervisory Directors (2010–present)

=== Non-profit organizations ===
- Berliner Republik magazine, Publisher
- Friedrich Ebert Foundation (FES), Member
- Progressives Zentrum, Member of the Circle of Friends
- FernUniversität Hagen, Member of the Parliamentary Advisory Board (2013–present)
- Leibniz Association, Member of the Senate
- Stiftung Neue Verantwortung, Member of the Presidium (2009–present)
- IG Metall, Member
- German Association for Small and Medium-Sized Businesses (BVMW), Member of the Political Advisory Board (2015–2016)
- Klaus Dieter Arndt Foundation, Deputy Chairman of the Board (2002–2005)
- ZDF, Member of the Television Board (2009–2010)

Party political offices
Preceded by Klaus Uwe Benneter	General Secretary of the Social Democratic Party of Germany; 2005–2009	Succeeded by Andrea Nahles
Preceded by Katarina Barley	General Secretary of the Social Democratic Party of Germany; 2017	Succeeded by Lars Klingbeil
Political offices
Preceded by Katarina Barley; Acting	Minister of Labour and Social Affairs; 2018–present	Incumbent
