= Saskia Esken =

Leader of the Social Democratic Party of Germany from 2019 to 2025

Saskia Esken MdB
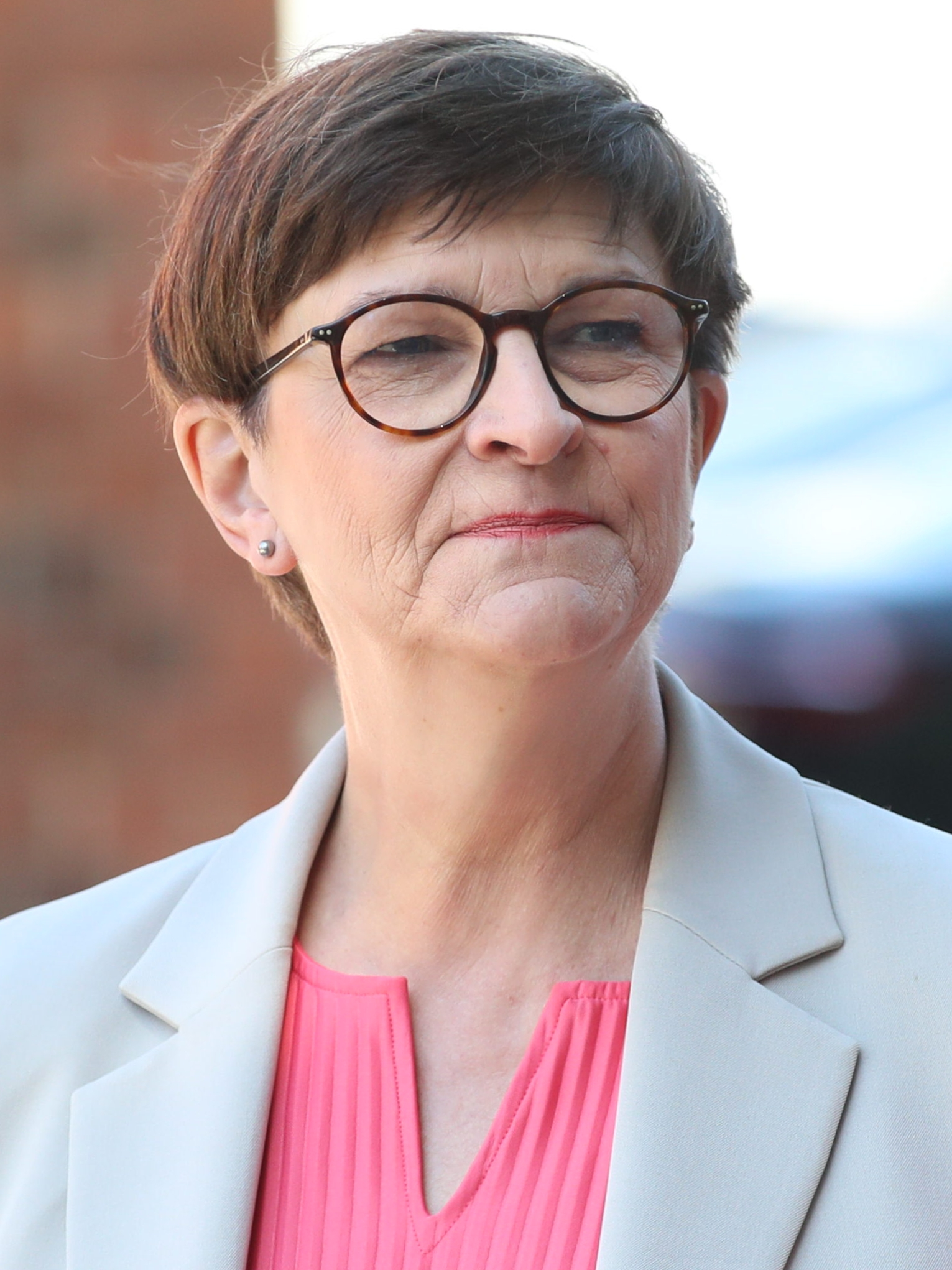
- Esken in 2025

Leader of the Social Democratic Party
- In office 6 December 2019 – 27 June 2025 Serving with Norbert Walter-Borjans (2019–2021) and Lars Klingbeil (since 2021)
- Deputy: Kevin Kühnert; Klara Geywitz; Hubertus Heil; Thomas Kutschaty; Serpil Midyatli; Anke Rehlinger
- General Secretary: Lars Klingbeil; Kevin Kühnert; Matthias Miersch
- Preceded by: Andrea Nahles
- Succeeded by: Bärbel Bas

Member of the Bundestag for Baden-Württemberg
- Incumbent
- Assumed office 22 September 2013
- Constituency: At-large

Personal details
- Born: Saskia Christina Hofer; 28 August 1961 (age 65) Stuttgart, Baden-Württemberg, West Germany
- Party: SPD (since 1990)
- Spouse: Roland Esken (m. 1993)
- Children: 3
- Occupation: Unskilled laborer, Software developer, Politician

Saskia Christina Esken (née Hofer; born 28 August 1961) is a German politician of the Social Democratic Party (SPD) who served as co-leader of the party from her election in December 2019 (alongside Norbert Walter-Borjans) and re-election in December 2021 (alongside Lars Klingbeil) until 2025. She has been a member of the Bundestag since 2013 and has worked in the IT sector in the early 1990s.

== Early life and career ==
Esken was born 1961 in Stuttgart. She graduated from the Johannes Kepler Gymnasium in Weil der Stadt in 1980 or 1981 She was the first in her family to attend university, but dropped out of the University of Stuttgart after four semesters of German studies and politics. From then on, Esken toured southern Germany as a street musician with her guitar, slept in her car, waited tables in pubs and delivered parcels, was a chauffeur and typist at the University of Stuttgart. She also worked as a production assistant. Esken completed her dual training as a state-certified computer scientist at the vocational college for computer science at the Akademie für Datenverarbeitung Böblingen (Böblingen Academy for Data Processing) in 1990. On the other hand, she writes that she completed this in 1991. She worked in software development until she ended her professional career after the birth of her first child in 1994. In 1994, 1996 and 1999, Esken and her husband Roland Esken became parents to Jana, Lena and Sebastian. She came to education policy via the voluntary parents' association and was deputy chair of the Baden-Württemberg state parents' council from 2012 to 2014. According to a report by the ARD magazine "Kontraste", the newly composed board of directors at the time dismissed the office manager after her email account was searched without consent. In response to an extensive "Kontraste" inquiry to Esken about the matter, the SPD stated that it would not comment on labor law issues.

== Political career ==
=== Early beginnings ===
Esken joined SPD in 1990, when she lived in Calw, a small town in the black forest region. From 2008 to 2015 she was the chairwoman of the Bad Liebenzell local association, and from 2010 to 2020 she was the chairwoman of the Calw district association.

=== Member of the German Parliament, 2013–present ===
Esken has been a member of the German Bundestag since the 2013 elections, representing Calw. In parliament, she served on the Committee on Internal Affairs (2018–2019), the Committee on the Digital Agenda (2013–2019), the Committee on Education, Research and Technology Assessment (2013–2017) and the Parliamentary Advisory Board on Sustainable Development (2013–2017). In this capacity, she was her parliamentary group's rapporteur on privacy, IT security, digital education, and eGovernment.

Within her parliamentary group, Esken was part of working groups on digital issues (since 2014) and on consumer protection (since 2018) as well as of the Parlamentarische Linke (Parliamentary Left), an association of left-wing MPs.

In the negotiations to form a coalition government under the leadership of Chancellor Angela Merkel following the 2017 federal elections, Esken was part of the working group on digital policy, led Helge Braun, Dorothee Bär, and Lars Klingbeil.

=== Co-Chair of the SPD, 2019–present ===
Together with Norbert Walter-Borjans, Esken announced her candidacy for the 2019 Social Democratic Party of Germany leadership election. During her campaign, she vowed to force Chancellor Merkel and her CDU/CSU bloc to renegotiate the coalition treaty or push for an “orderly retreat” from the government. Esken and Walter-Borjans won the November 2019 run-off against Klara Geywitz and Olaf Scholz.

Shortly after, both Esken and Walter-Borjans stepped back from their threat to pull out of Merkel’s government and instead signed off on a “compromise”, calling for measures including a “massive” investment program and a minimum wage of 12 euros per hour. At the time, this was widely interpreted as a move designed to mend relations between leftwing and centrist factions in the SPD.

In August 2020, Esken and Walter-Borjans released a joint statement announcing Olaf Scholz as the party’s candidate to succeed Merkel in the 2021 elections.

In the 2021 Bundestag election, she once again entered the German Bundestag in first place on the Baden-Württemberg state list. In the Calw constituency, she came second behind Klaus Mack from the CDU with 17.2% of the first votes.

Esken originally wanted to retire after the legislative term of the 20th German Bundestag. In 2024, she decided to run in the 2025 Bundestag elections, in which she heads the state list of the SPD in Baden-Württemberg.

In the early federal election on February 23, 2025, the SPD, under its Chancellor Olaf Scholz and co-chaired by Esken, came third with 16.4% of the second votes. This was not only their worst result in a Bundestag election since the Federal Republic of Germany was founded, but also their worst result in a national parliamentary election for 138 years; the last time the Social Democrats were even worse was in the Reichstag election of 1887 in the German Empire, when they were still called the Socialist Workers' Party.

In her constituency 280 (Calw), Esken achieved 12.89% of the first votes and was therefore also in third place behind the opposing candidates from the CDU with 39.04% and the AfD with 24.21%. Esken again entered the Bundestag in first place on the state list of the SPD Baden-Württemberg.

After demands had already been made from her own party, the SPD, in September 2024 regarding Esken's participation in talk shows, there were calls within the party in March 2025 for Esken to step down from her position as party chairwoman.

Since April, internal negotiations are taking place about the posts in the future government. While more and more people are speaking out against Esken and turning their backs on her, Esken is insisting on a top position as a minister in the new government coalition.

Esken's view on a coalition between the CDU/CSU („Union“) and the SPD as GroKo (Große Koalition, Grand Coalition) is noteworthy here: as we learned in an earlier interview, she is convinced that „a grand coalition is always an emergency solution, an accident rather than the norm“. She looks back with frustration and bitterness on previous coalitions with the CDU/CSU, in which the SPD was merely the junior partner. Esken considers cooperation between the parties of a GroKo with their different programs to be very difficult and problematic.

In May 2025, it was announced that Esken will not receive a ministerial office, but she will continue to be a member of the Bundestag (due to her place on the list in Baden-Württemberg, where she was again placed first in the last Bundestag election). Esken subsequently announced that she will not seek re-election as the party chairwoman. The driving force behind Esken's withdrawal were some SPD-top politicians, like Manuela Schwesig, Minister-President of Mecklenburg-Western Pomerania. According to observers, she feared a loss of power to the CDU and AfD in her state if the SPD pursued a more left-wing policy.

== Other activities ==
=== Regulatory agencies ===
- Federal Network Agency for Electricity, Gas, Telecommunications, Post and Railway (BNetzA), Member of the advisory board (since 2018)

=== Non-profit organizations ===
- Stiftung Datenschutz, Member of the Strategic Advisory Board
- Ein Netz für Kinder, Member of the Board of Trustees (since 2014)
- German Federation for the Environment and Nature Conservation (BUND), Member
- Greenpeace, Member
- German United Services Trade Union (ver.di), Member
- Federal Agency for Civic Education, Alternate Member of the Board of Trustees (2014-2018)

== Political positions ==
Saskia Esken is part of the more left wing of SPD and was counterpart of Lars Klingbeil, who is member of Seheimer Kreis.

In March 2019, Esken opposed the European Union's Directive on Copyright in the Digital Single Market and its article 13.

Also in 2019, Esken called repeatedly for a renegotiation of the 2018 coalition treaty on issues such as government spending and climate change policy.

Following the 2022 Russian invasion of Ukraine, Esken became the member of her Social Democrats’ leadership to call on Gerhard Schröder to quit the party when he kept defending his close ties to Russia’s leadership.

During the Gaza war, in support of Israel's actions Esken announced that she had cancelled a meeting with American-Jewish US Senator, Bernie Sanders, over his stance on the war, which he said included war crimes on both sides. Esken wrote on Bluesky Social: “He (Sanders) would have had the chance to ... clearly stand on the side of Israel and against the terror of Hamas and others. But he doesn’t do that." In response, a Sanders staffer was quoted as saying, “Bernie had never heard of Saskia Esken, but I’m sure he would have been pleased to meet her.”

On 1 May 2024, in an Interview with the Austrian television news broadcast Zeit im Bild (ORF), Esken described the Far-right Alternative for Germany as a Nazi Party and compared it to Joseph Goebbels. She said, they want to destroy democracy.

== Controversy ==
In mid-2020, the Berlin attorney general's office received hundreds of complaints accusing Esken of slander for using the term "Covidiots" on Twitter; Esken had said that protesters at a Berlin march threatened the health of others by violating social distancing rules and ignoring requirements to wear masks. The prosecutors dismissed the legal complaints, arguing that Esken was exercising her constitutional right to express her opinion.
