= Lars Klingbeil =

Vice Chancellor of Germany since 2025

Lars Klingbeil MdB
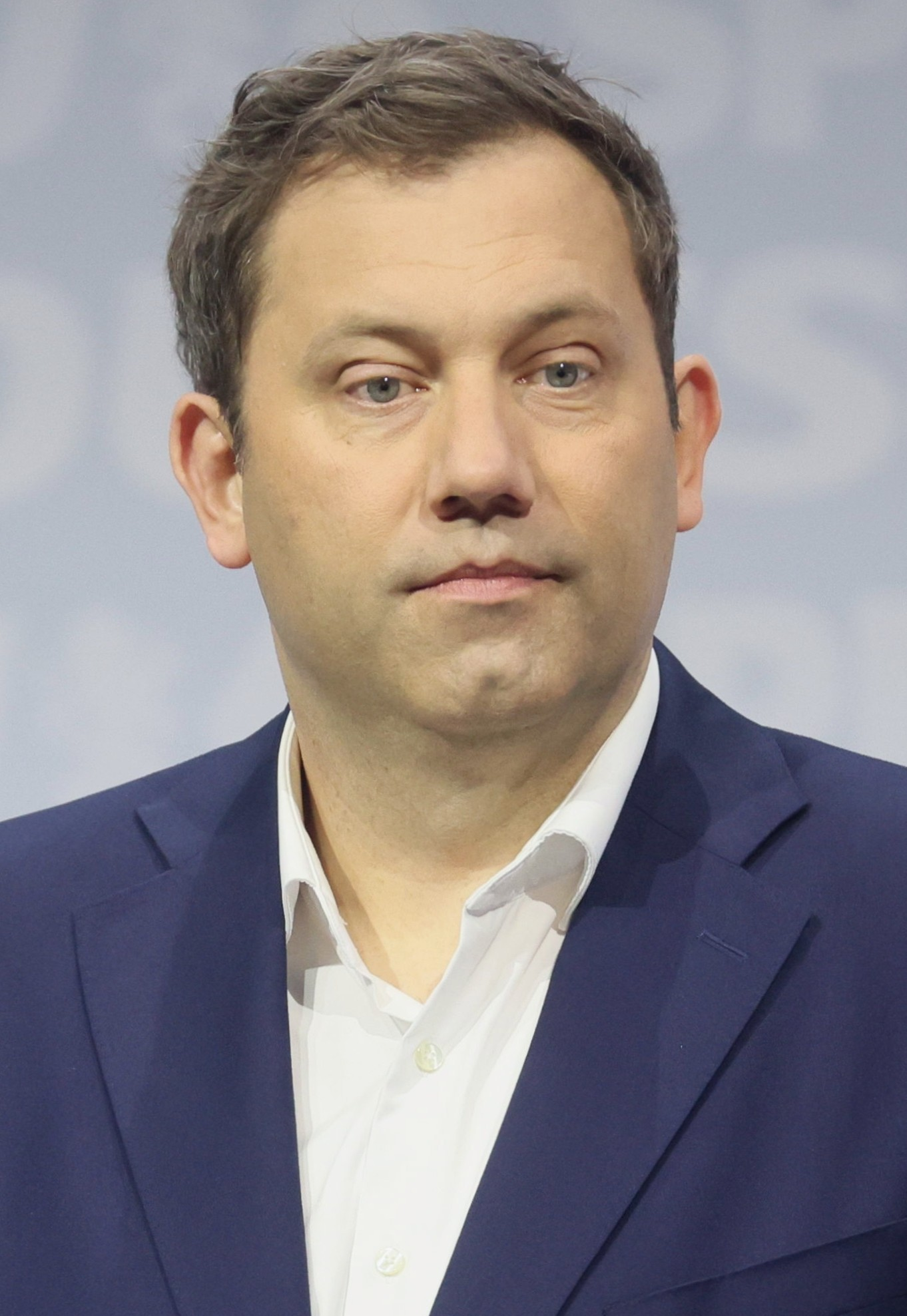
- Klingbeil in 2025

Vice Chancellor of Germany
- Incumbent
- Assumed office 6 May 2025
- Chancellor: Friedrich Merz
- Preceded by: Robert Habeck

Minister of Finance
- Incumbent
- Assumed office 6 May 2025
- Chancellor: Friedrich Merz
- Preceded by: Jörg Kukies

Leader of the Social Democratic Party
- Incumbent
- Assumed office 11 December 2021
- General Secretary: Kevin Kühnert; Matthias Miersch; Tim Klüssendorf
- Deputy: Petra Köpping; Serpil Midyatli; Achim Post; Anke Rehlinger; Alexander Schweitzer
- Preceded by: Norbert Walter-Borjans

Leader of the Social Democratic Party in the Bundestag
- In office 26 February 2025 – 6 May 2025
- Preceded by: Rolf Mützenich
- Succeeded by: Matthias Miersch

General Secretary of the Social Democratic Party
- In office 8 December 2017 – 11 December 2021
- Leader: Martin Schulz; Andrea Nahles; Saskia Esken; Norbert Walter-Borjans
- Preceded by: Hubertus Heil
- Succeeded by: Kevin Kühnert

Member of the Bundestag for Lower Saxony
- Incumbent
- Assumed office 24 October 2017
- Preceded by: Reinhard Grindel
- Constituency: Rotenburg I – Heidekreis
- In office 27 October 2009 – 24 October 2017
- Preceded by: multi-member district
- Succeeded by: multi-member district
- Constituency: Social Democratic Party list
- In office 24 January 2005 – 18 October 2005
- Preceded by: Jann-Peter Janssen
- Succeeded by: multi-member district
- Constituency: Social Democratic Party list

Personal details
- Born: 23 February 1978 (age 48) Soltau, Lower Saxony, West Germany
- Party: Social Democratic Party
- Spouse: Lena-Sophie Müller (m. 2019)
- Children: 1
- Education: Leibniz University Hannover (AB, MA)

Lars Klingbeil (German: [ˈlaʁs ˈklɪŋbaɪl]; born 23 February 1978) is a German politician who has been serving as the Vice Chancellor of Germany and Federal Minister of Finance since May 2025. A member of the Social Democratic Party (SPD), he has served as the SPD's co-Leader since 2021, together with Saskia Esken (2021–2025) and Bärbel Bas (2025–2026).

Klingbeil was the General Secretary of the SPD from December 2017 to December 2021. Since 2001 he has been a member of the City Council of Munster and a member of the District Council of Heide. He was a Member of the Bundestag for about nine months in 2005, and has been a member again since the 2009 Federal Election. From 2003 till 2007, Klingbeil was the Deputy Leader of the Jusos, SPD's youth wing. Klingbeil is a member of the Seeheim Circle, the more economically right-leaning faction of the SPD.

== Early life and education ==
The son of a soldier, Klingbeil was born into a working-class family in Soltau. He has a sister.

After graduating from school with his Abitur in Munster, Lower Saxony and completing his alternative civilian service, in 1999 Klingbeil began studying political science at Leibniz University Hannover, graduating in 2004 with a M.A. degree. From 2001 to 2004 he received a scholarship from the Friedrich Ebert Foundation (FES); in 2001, he completed an internship in the foundation's New York office and witnessed the September 11 attacks.

== Political career ==
Klingbeil is member of the SPD since 1996. Whilst at university, he worked in the constituency offices of Chancellor Gerhard Schröder and Heino Wiese from 2001 until 2003. After finishing his studies he worked as youth education advisor for the Social Democratic Party in North Rhine-Westphalia.

=== Member of Parliament ===
From 24 January 2005 until 18 October 2005 Klingbeil was a Member of the Bundestag following the resignation of Jann-Peter Janssen. During these nine months Klingbeil was a member of the Committee on European Affairs, the Committee on Health and a deputy member of the Defence Committee of the Bundestag.

Leaving office after the 2005 national elections, Klingbeil worked as chief of staff to the chairman of the Social Democratic Party in Lower Saxony Garrelt Duin. Furthermore, Klingbeil was a member of the SPD leadership's International Commission from 2004 until 2007, and since 2006 he has been the deputy leader of the SPD in the Soltau-Falingbostel regional council.

Klingbeil stood in the 2009 federal elections in the constituency Rotenburg I – Soltau Fallingbostel, however, he lost with 35.2% of the vote against the CDU's candidate Reinhard Grindel who had won 40.2% of the vote. He did manage to enter the Bundestag as a List MP for Lower Saxony.

Klingbeil has been a member of the Defence Committee since 2009 as well as being a deputy member of the Committee on Cultural Affairs and Media. Since 2013, he has also been leading the Bundestag group of SPD parliamentarians from Lower Saxony, the second largest delegations within the SPD parliamentary group. In addition to his committee assignments, he served as deputy chairman of the German-Russian Parliamentary Friendship Group from 2010 until 2013.

Klingbeil managed to win the constituency of Rotenburg I – Heidekreis in the 2017 elections, winning with 41.2% of vote. He contested the same constituency at the 2021 German federal election.

=== Secretary General of the SPD ===
On 19 October 2017, Social Democratic Party chairman Martin Schulz nominated Klingbeil as secretary general. He was confirmed on 8 December 2017 with 70.62% of the vote at the SPD Party Conference in Berlin, succeeding Hubertus Heil who had announced his resignation after the SPD disastrous loss in the 2017 election. In the negotiations to form a fourth cabinet under Chancellor Angela Merkel following the elections, he was part of the leadership team of his party's delegation. He also led the working group on digital policy, alongside Helge Braun and Dorothee Bär.

=== Vice-Chancellor and Minister of Finance (2025–present) ===
On 30 April 2025, Klingbeil was announced as the next Vice-Chancellor and Minister of Finance in Friedrich Merz's cabinet. He was sworn in on 6 May 2025.

In November 2025, Klingbeil visited China as part of the biannual financial dialogue talks between the two countries. During the visit, he met with Vice Premier He Lifeng and Wang Huning, the chairman of the National Committee of the Chinese People's Political Consultative Conference. He also met with Liu Haixing, the head of the International Department of the Chinese Communist Party, in his capacity as the co-leader of the Social Democratic Party as part of the party dialogue between the SPD and the CCP established in 1984.

== Other activities ==
=== Corporate boards ===
- FC Bayern, Member of the Advisory Board (since 2022)
- Deutsche Druck- und Verlagsgesellschaft (DDVG), Ex-Officio Member of the supervisory board (since 2017)
- Stadtwerke Munster-Bispingen, Member of the supervisory board (2009–2017)

=== Regulatory bodies ===
- Federal Network Agency for Electricity, Gas, Telecommunications, Post and Railway (BNetzA), Alternate Member of the advisory board (2013–2018)

=== Non-profit organizations ===
- Business Forum of the Social Democratic Party of Germany, Member of the Political Advisory Board (since 2018)
- St Barbara Foundation, Member of the Board of Trustees
- Liquid Democracy, Member of the Board of Trustees
- 2017 German Computer Games Award, Member of the Jury
- German Association for Defence Technology (DWT), Member of the Presidium (2013–2017)
- Soldiers and Veterans Foundation (SVS), Member of the Board of Trustees (2009–2017)
- German Welfare Society (SoVD), Member
- IG Bergbau, Chemie, Energie (IG BCE), Member
- Lions Club, Member

== Personal life ==
Klingbeil has been married to Lena-Sophie Müller since 2019. In 2024, Müller gave birth to the couple's son. The family lives in Munster and Berlin's Charlottenburg district.

In a 2025 interview, Klingbeil revealed that he had undergone treatment for oral cancer in 2014.

Klingbeil is an avid supporter of the FC Bayern football team, and played in a punk rock band, Sleeping Silence, in his youth.

Party political offices
Preceded by Hubertus Heil	General Secretary of the Social Democratic Party; 2017–2021	Succeeded by Kevin Kühnert
Preceded by Norbert Walter-Borjans	Leader of the Social Democratic Party; 2021–present	Incumbent
