= Norbert Walter-Borjans =

German politician (born 1952)

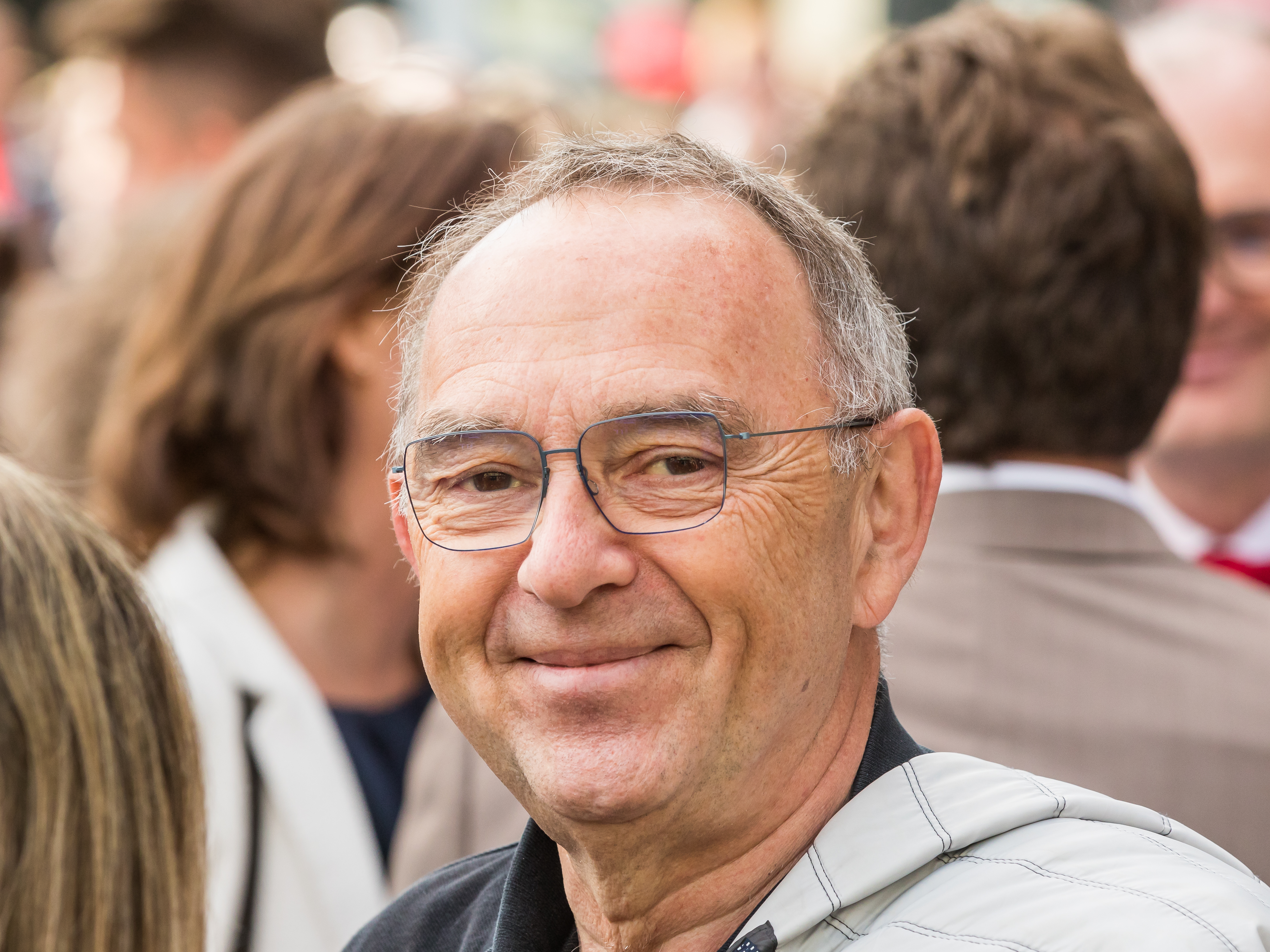
- Walter-Borjans in 2022

Leader of the Social Democratic Party
- In office 6 December 2019 – 11 December 2021 Serving with Saskia Esken
- General Secretary: Lars Klingbeil
- Deputy: Klara Geywitz; Hubertus Heil; Kevin Kühnert; Serpil Midyatli; Anke Rehlinger
- Preceded by: Malu Dreyer (acting)
- Succeeded by: Lars Klingbeil

Minister of Finance of North Rhine-Westphalia
- In office 14 July 2010 – 27 June 2017
- Minister-President: Hannelore Kraft
- Preceded by: Helmut Linssen
- Succeeded by: Lutz Lienenkämper

Member of the Bundesrat for North Rhine-Westphalia
- In office 15 July 2010 – 27 June 2017
- Preceded by: multi-member district
- Succeeded by: multi-member district

Personal details
- Born: 17 September 1952 (age 74) Krefeld-Uerdingen, North Rhine-Westphalia, West Germany (now Germany)
- Party: Social Democratic Party (1983–)
- Education: University of Bonn; University of Cologne
- Occupation: Politician; Economist; Civil Servant

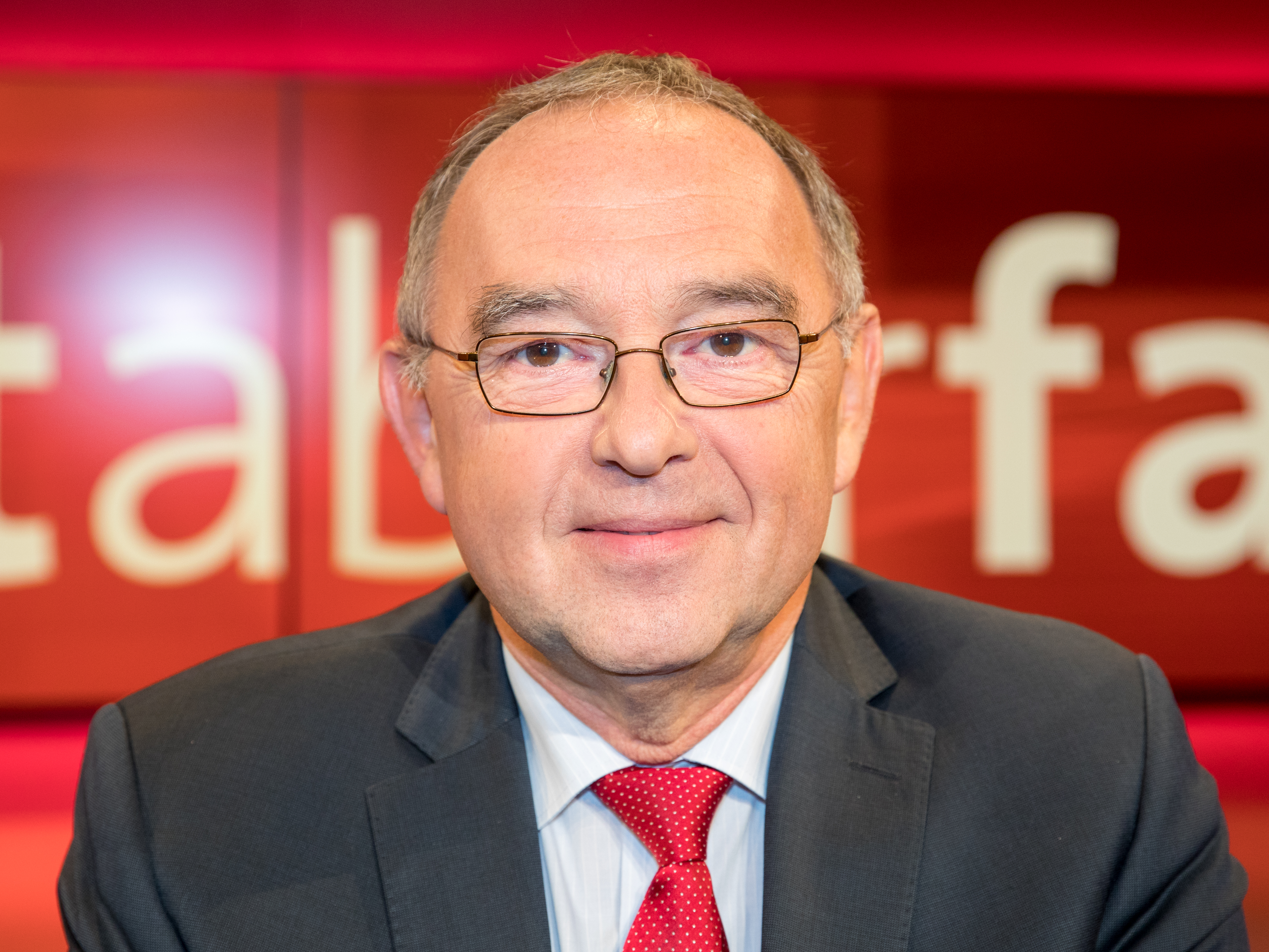
Walter-Borjans in 2018

Norbert Walter-Borjans (born 17 September 1952), also known by the nickname NoWaBo, is a German economist and politician of the Social Democratic Party (SPD) who served as co-leader of the SPD (alongside Saskia Esken) from 2019 to 2021. He served as State Minister of Finance of North Rhine-Westphalia from 2010 until 2017.

== Early life and education ==
The son of a carpenter, Walter-Borjans was born 1952 in the West German city of Krefeld and studied economics at the University of Bonn and reached a PhD.

== Political career ==
From 1991 until 1998, Walter-Borjans worked as spokesperson of the state government of North Rhine-Westphalia, then led by Minister-President Johannes Rau.

From 2010 to 2017 Walter-Borjans served as State Minister of Finance of North Rhine-Westphalia, in the government of Minister-President Hannelore Kraft. In this capacity, he was one of the state's representatives in the Bundesrat, where he served on the Finance Committee. During his time in office, the state government – as main shareholder –, the German government and Helaba agreed to divide up the asset of ailing WestLB and cover any losses during the winding-down process. On Walter-Borjans's initiative, the state government on several occasions resorted to buying Swiss account data from whistle-blowers to pursue German tax dodgers.

In the negotiations to form a Grand Coalition of Chancellor Angela Merkel's Christian Democrats (CDU together with the Bavarian CSU) and the SPD following the 2013 federal elections, Walter-Borjans was part of the SPD delegation in the working group on financial policies and the national budget, led by Wolfgang Schäuble and Olaf Scholz.

Together with Saskia Esken, Walter-Borjans announced his candidacy for the 2019 Social Democratic Party of Germany leadership election; the duo was soon endorsed by the SPD in North Rhine-Westphalia, the party's largest chapter, and its chairman Sebastian Hartmann. as well as the SPD youth organization and its leader Kevin Kühnert, which account for some 80,000 of the 430,000 SPD members. The November 2019 run-off was won by Esken and Walter-Borjans.

Walter-Borjans was nominated by his party as delegate to the Federal Convention for the purpose of electing the President of Germany in 2022.

== Other activities ==
=== Corporate boards ===
- NRW.BANK, Ex-Officio Member of the Supervisory Board (2012–2017)
- Portigon, Ex-Officio Member of the Supervisory Board (2012–2017)
- RAG AG, Ex-Officio Member of the Supervisory Board (2012–2017)
- KfW, Ex-Officio Member of the Board of Supervisory Directors (2010–2017)

=== Non-profit organizations ===
- Deutschlandradio, Member of the Broadcasting Council (2012–2017)
- Verkehrsclub Deutschland, Founding Member
