= Steffen Freiberg =

German politician (born 1981)

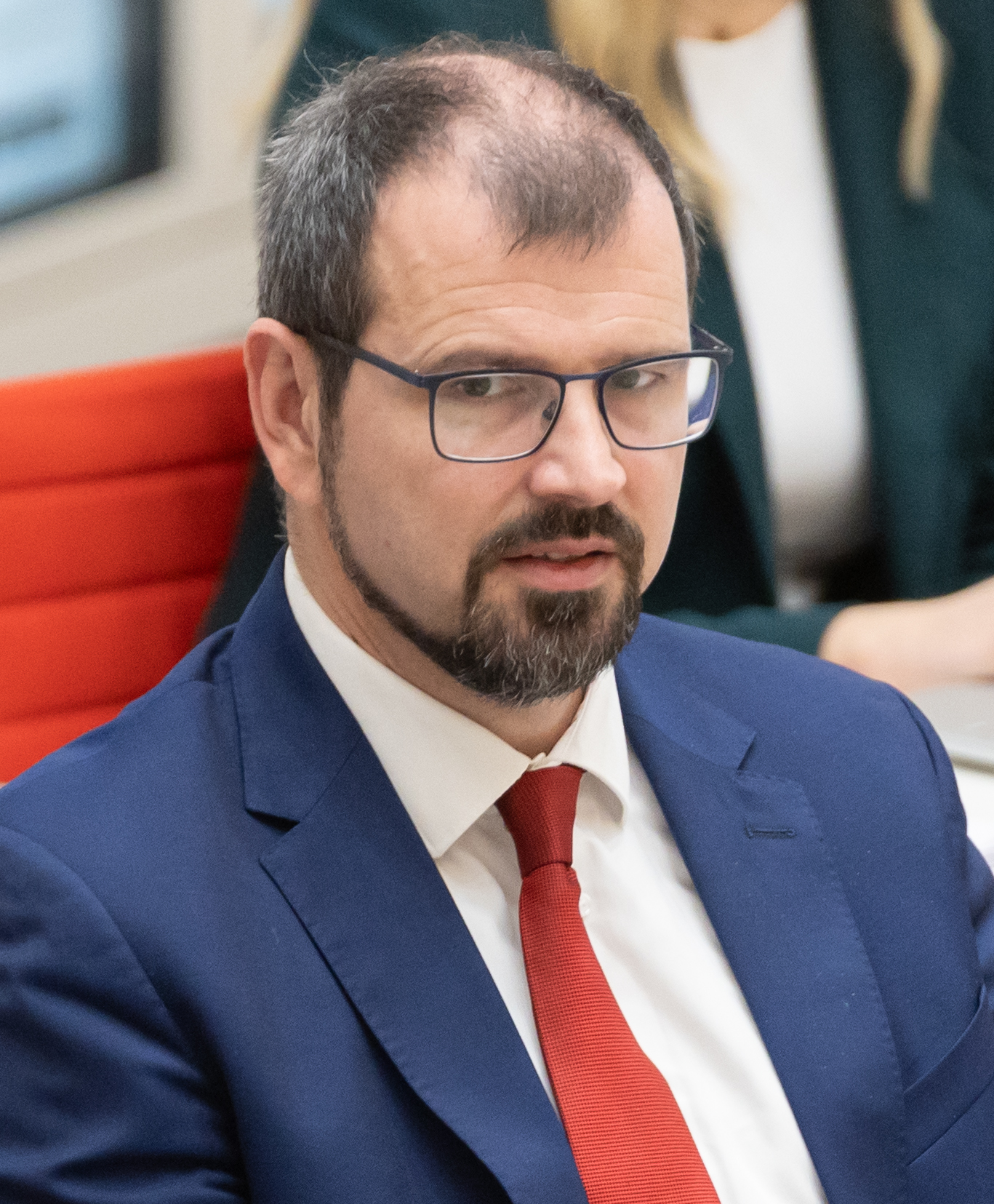

Minister for Education, Youth and Sport of the State of Brandenburg
- In office 10 May 2023 – 18 March 2026
- Preceded by: Britta Ernst
- Succeeded by: Gordon Hoffmann

Personal details
- Born: Steffen Freiberg; 23 September 1981 (age 45) Rostock, Germany (then East Germany)
- Party: SPD
- Education: University of Rostock

Steffen Freiberg (born 23 September 1981) is a German politician from the Social Democratic Party of Germany (SPD). He has been Minister for Education, Youth and Sport of the State of Brandenburg since 2023 to March 18, 2026.

== Life ==
After graduating from high school in Rostock in 2000, Freiberg began studying political and administrative sciences as well as English/American studies at the University of Rostock, where he graduated with a Bachelor of Arts in 2004 and a Master of Arts in 2007. During this time, he was chairman of the General Student Committee at his university from 2002 to 2003.

Freiberg is a member of the SPD. In 2006 he became a consultant for the environment, consumer protection and right-wing extremism in the SPD parliamentary group in the Landtag of Mecklenburg-Vorpommern, in 2007 he became a consultant for state parliament affairs in the Ministry of Transport, Construction and Regional Development of Mecklenburg-Vorpommern and until 2008 he was also deputy head of the office. In 2008 he moved to the State Chancellery of Mecklenburg-Vorpommern, where he became head of department for state parliament affairs. In 2011 he became head of the ministerial office of Mathias Brodkorb in the Ministry of Education, Science and Culture of Mecklenburg-Vorpommern.

In November 2016, Steffen Freiberg was appointed state secretary for schools and political education in the Ministry of Education, Science and Culture in the third Sellering cabinet (Mecklenburg-Western Pomerania) by Minister Birgit Hesse. Bettina Martin took over this role in 2019. When the second Schwesig cabinet took office on 15 November 2021, he was temporarily retired at the age of 40. Most recently, the state of digitization in schools in the state had been heavily criticized, saying that despite the digital framework plan, it had fallen far short of its potential. The minister of education who succeeded her in November, Simone Oldenburg, also criticized the approach to introducing the new subject of social sciences in 2021 while still in opposition.

From 10 January 2022 to 10 May 2023 he was state secretary in the Ministry for Education, Youth and Sport of the State of Brandenburg.

Following the resignation of Minister Britta Ernst on 17 April 2023, he was appointed minister for education, youth and sport of the State of Brandenburg of the State of Brandenburg in the Third Woidke cabinet on 10 May 2023 and confirmed in office in the fourth Woidke cabinet on 11 December 2024.
