= Second Schwesig cabinet =

Incumbent state government of Mecklenburg-Vorpommern

Second Cabinet of Manuela Schwesig Schwesig II
- 11th Cabinet of Mecklenburg-Vorpommern
- 15 November 2021 – 16 November 2026
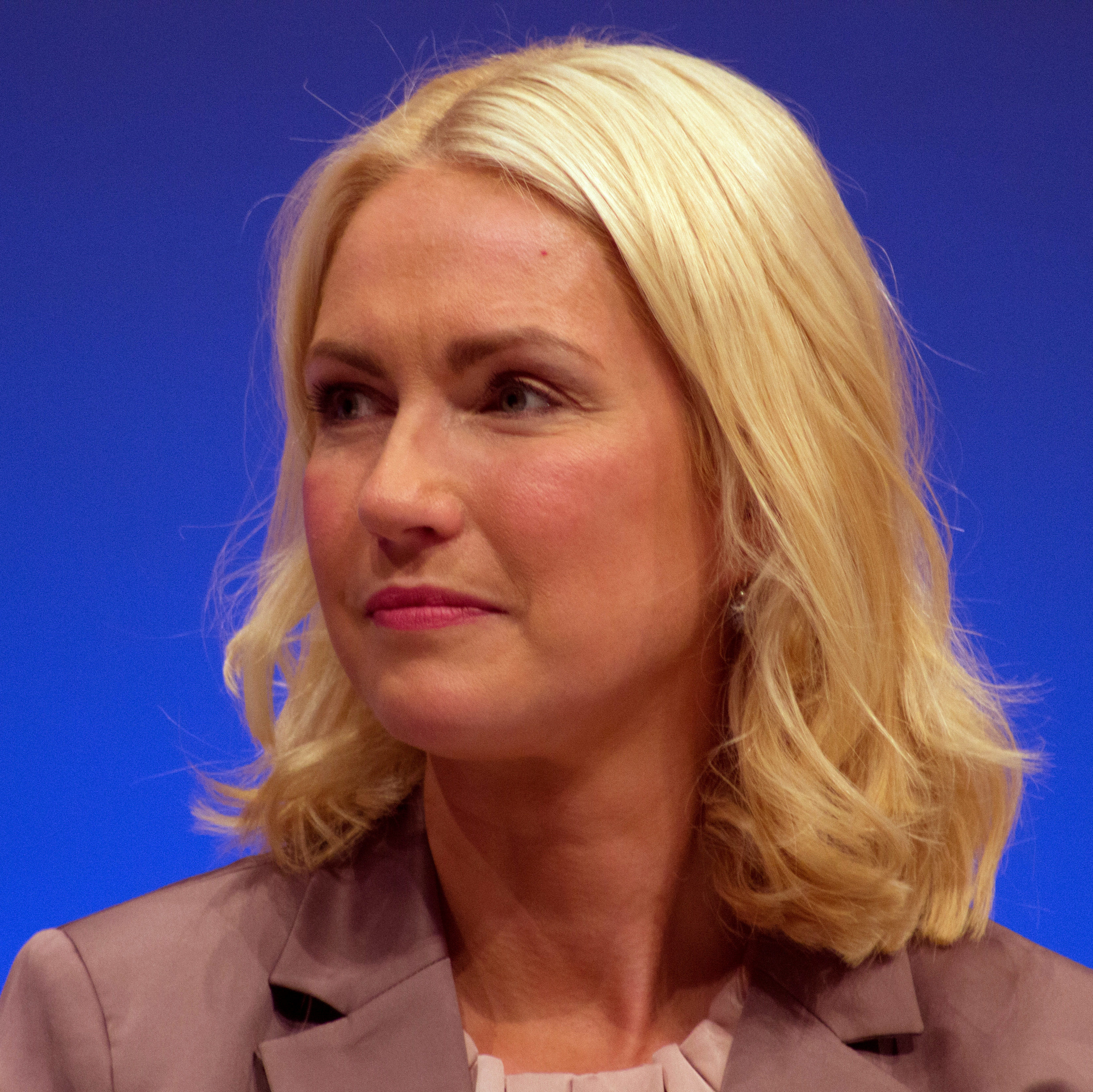
- Manuela Schwesig at the SPD federal conference in June 2017
- Date formed: 15 November 2021
- Date dissolved: 16 November 2026

People and organisations
- Minister-President: Manuela Schwesig
- Deputy Minister-President: Simone Oldenburg
- No. of ministers: 8
- Member parties: Social Democratic Party; The Left
- Status in legislature: Coalition government (Majority)
- Opposition parties: Alternative for Germany; Christian Democratic Union; Alliance 90/The Greens; Free Democratic Party

History
- Election: 2021 Mecklenburg-Vorpommern state election
- Legislature term: 8th Landtag of Mecklenburg-Vorpommern
- Predecessor: First Schwesig cabinet (Kabinett Schwesig I)
- Successor: Third Schwesig cabinet

The Second Schwesig cabinet is the incumbent state government of Mecklenburg-Vorpommern, sworn in on 15 November 2021 after Manuela Schwesig was elected as Minister-President of Mecklenburg-Vorpommern by the members of the Landtag of Mecklenburg-Vorpommern. It is the 11th Cabinet of Mecklenburg-Vorpommern.

It was formed after the 2021 Mecklenburg-Vorpommern state election by the Social Democratic Party (SPD) and The Left (LINKE). Excluding the Minister-President, the cabinet comprises eight ministers. Six are members of the SPD and two are members of The Left.

== Formation ==
The previous cabinet was a coalition government of the SPD and Christian Democratic Union (CDU) led by Manuela Schwesig of the SPD, who took office in July 2017.

The election took place on 26 September 2021, and resulted in a significant swing to the SPD, while the CDU and the opposition AfD and The Left suffered losses. The Greens and FDP both re-entered the Landtag with 6%.

Overall, the incumbent coalition was returned with an increased majority. Minister-President Schwesig indicated that she planned to talk to all parties except the AfD; exploratory talks with the CDU and The Left were held on 1 October. On 13 October, Schwesig announced that the SPD had voted unanimously to seek coalition negotiations with The Left. Discussions began the following week. The parties finalised their coalition agreement on 5 November and presented it three days later. It was approved by both parties and formally signed on 13 November.

Schwesig was elected as Minister-President by the Landtag on 15 November, winning 41 votes out of 79 cast.

== Composition ==
Portfolio	Minister	Party	Took office	Left office	State secretaries
Minister-President; State Chancellery	Manuela Schwesig born 23 May 1974 (age 52)	SPD	15 November 2021	16 November 2026	Patrick Dahlemann (Head of the State Chancellery); Heiko Miraß (Western Pomerania and Eastern Mecklenburg)
Deputy Minister-President Minister for Education and Daycare Centres	Simone Oldenburg born 22 March 1969 (age 57)	LINKE	15 November 2021	20 October 2026	Tom Michael Scheidung
Minister for Economics, Infrastructure, Tourism and Labour	Reinhard Meyer born 5 September 1959 (age 67)	SPD	15 November 2021	11 December 2024	Jochen Schulte; Ines Jesse
Minister for Economics, Infrastructure, Tourism and Labour	Wolfgang Blank born 20 December 1959 (age 66)	Unaffiliated	11 December 2024	16 November 2026	Jochen Schulte; Ines Jesse
Minister for Interior and Construction (from July 22, 2025); Minister for Interior, Construction and Digitalisation (formerly)	Christian Pegel born 7 January 1974 (age 52)	SPD	15 November 2021	16 November 2026	Christian Frenzel (Interior and Communities); Ina-Maria Ulbrich (Digitalisation)
Minister for Social Affairs, Health and Sport	Stefanie Drese born 9 December 1976 (age 49)	SPD	15 November 2021	16 November 2026	Sylvia Grimm; Frauke Hilgemann (Combating the COVID-19 pandemic)
Minister for Science, Culture, and Federal and European Affairs	Bettina Martin born 19 March 1966 (age 60)	SPD	15 November 2021	16 November 2026	Susanne Bowen; Jutta Bieringer (Representative to the Federal Government)
Minister for Climate Protection, Agriculture, Rural Areas and Environment	Till Backhaus born 13 March 1959 (age 67)	SPD	15 November 2021	16 November 2026	André Konsolke
Minister for Finance	Heiko Geue born 5 October 1965 (age 61)	SPD	15 November 2021	16 November 2026	Carola Voß
Minister for Justice, Equality and Consumer Protection	Jacqueline Bernhardt born 13 February 1977 (age 49)	LINKE	15 November 2021	16 November 2026	Babette Bohlen
