= 2021 Mecklenburg-Vorpommern state election =

German state election

- 26 September 2021

All 79 seats in the Landtag, including 8 overhang and leveling seats 40 seats needed for a majority
- Turnout: 928,807 (70.8%) ▲8.9pp
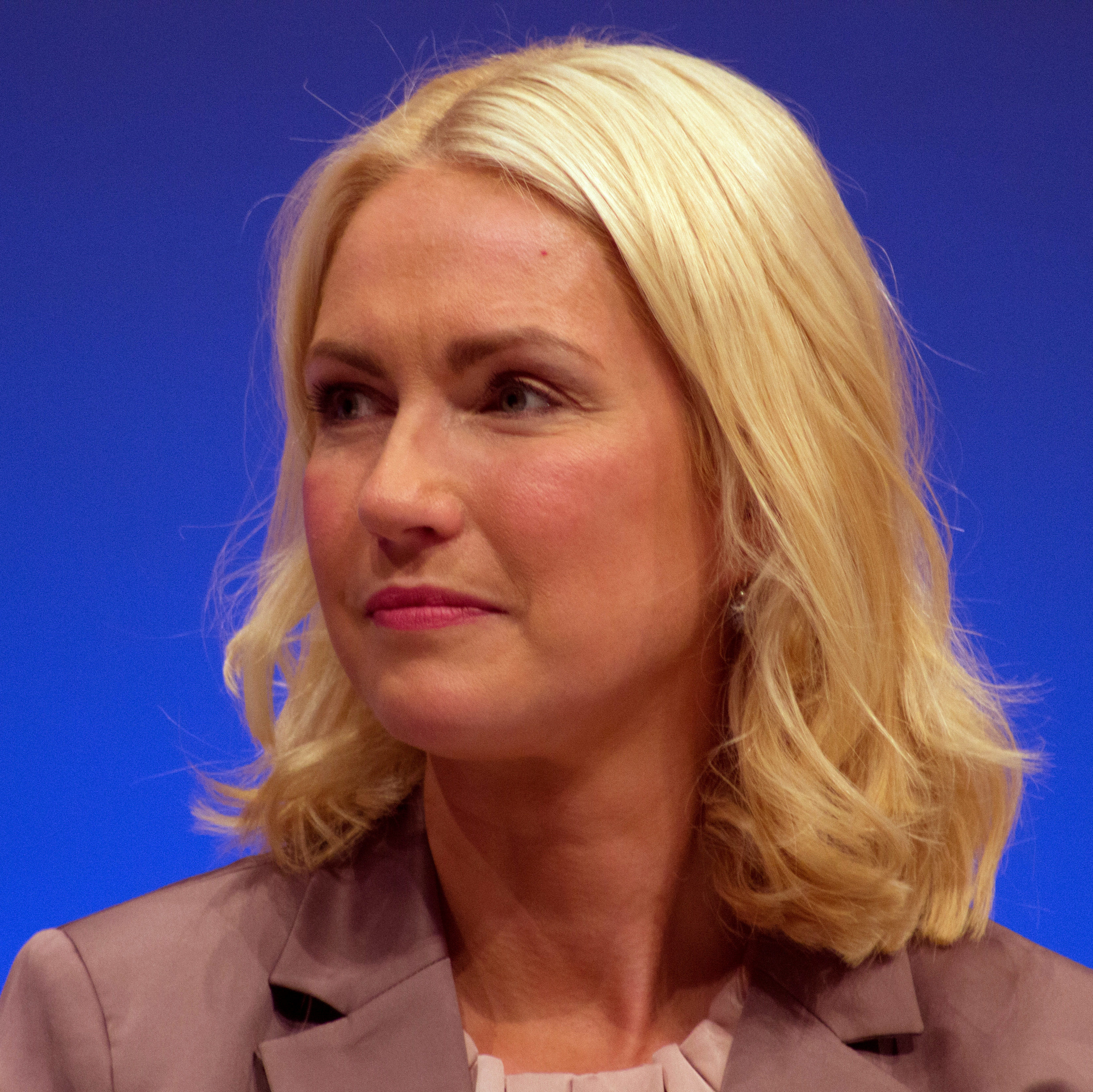

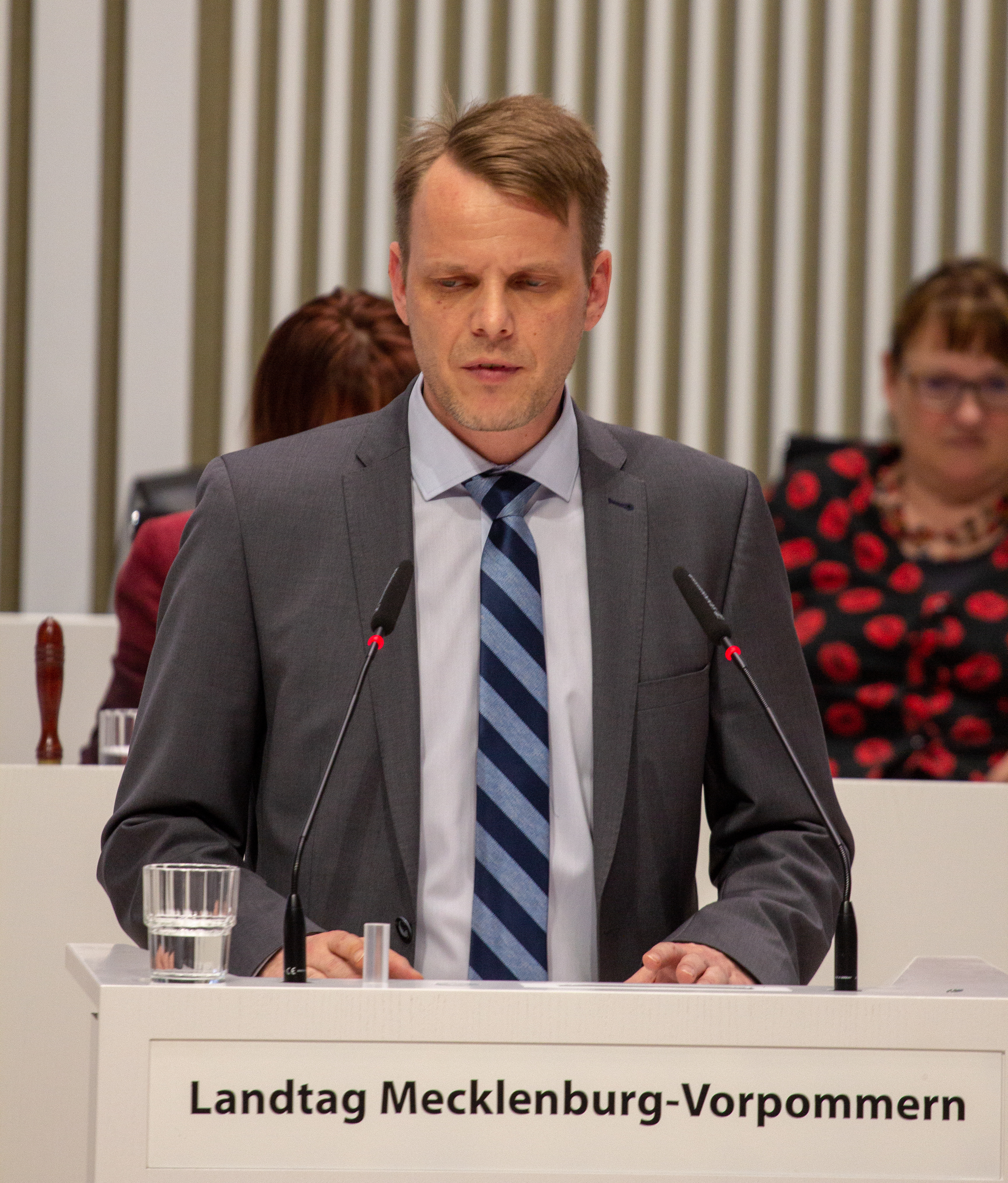

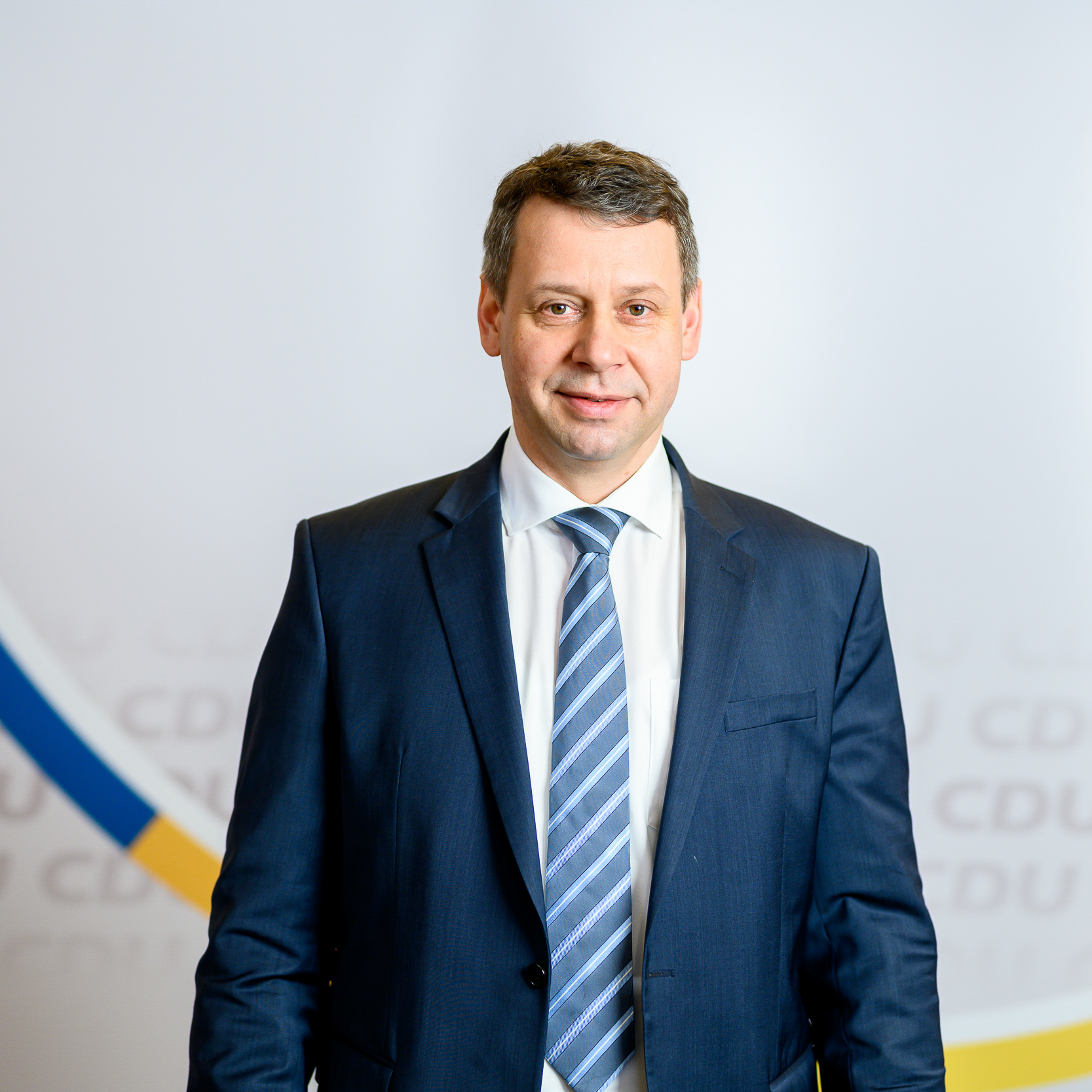

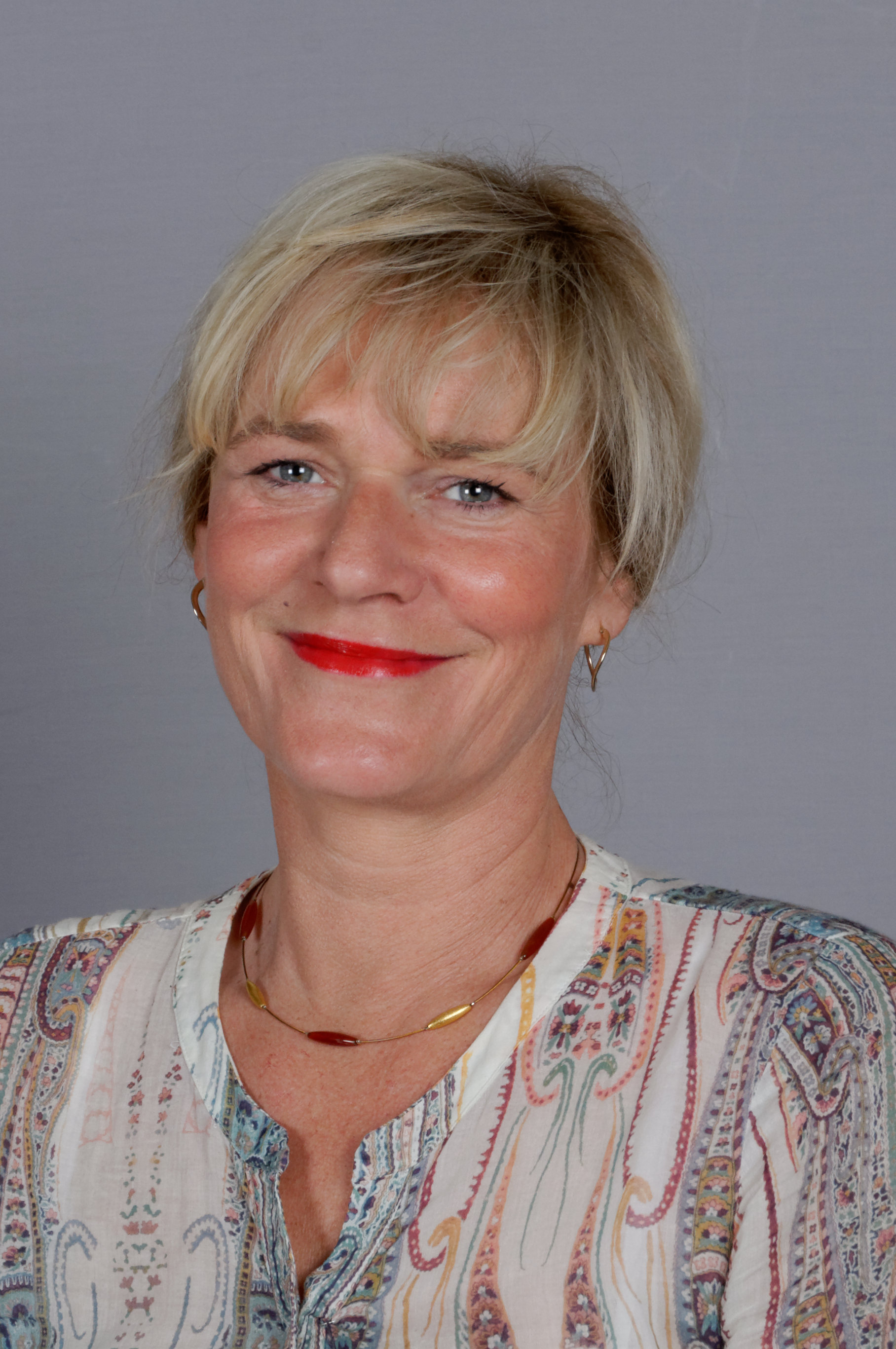

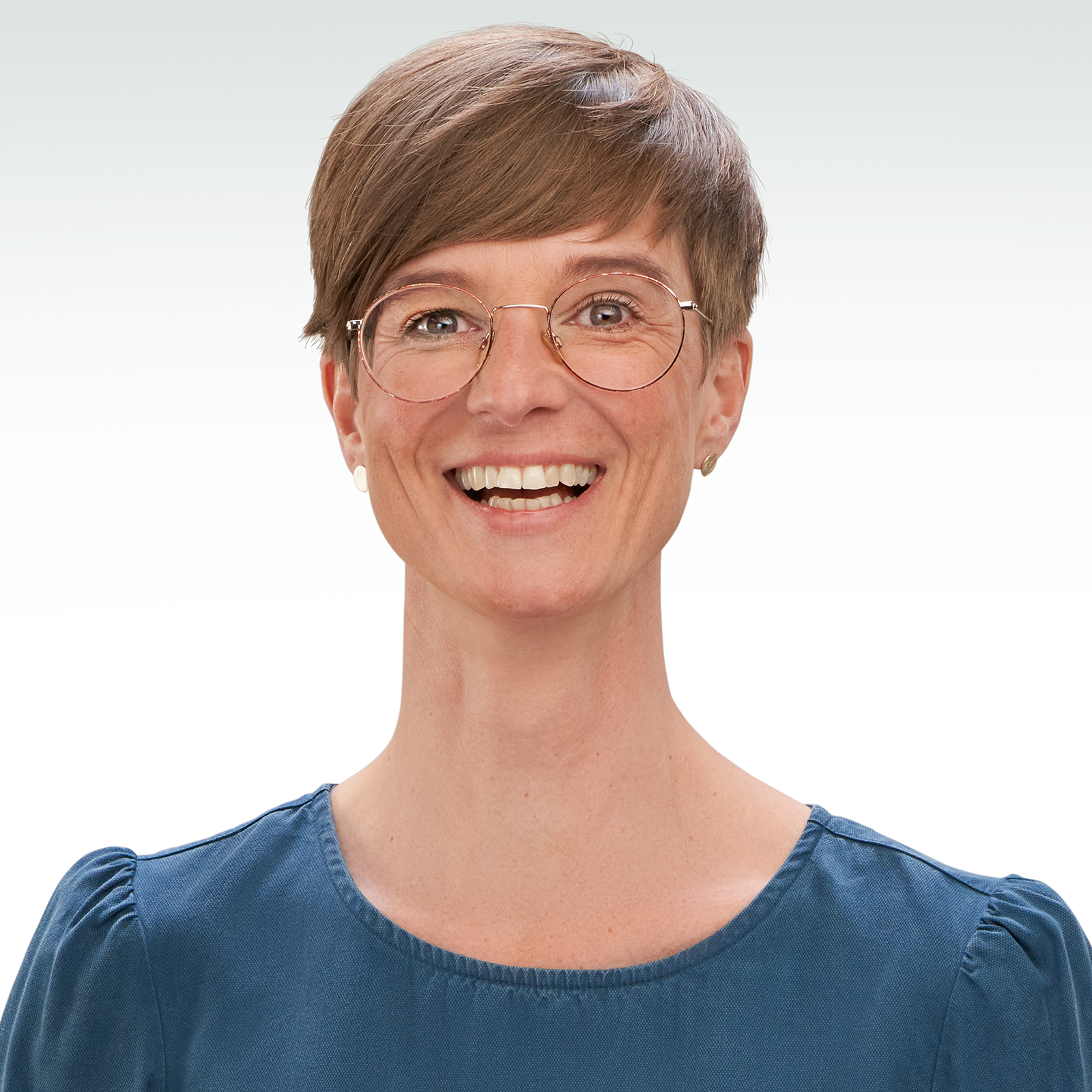

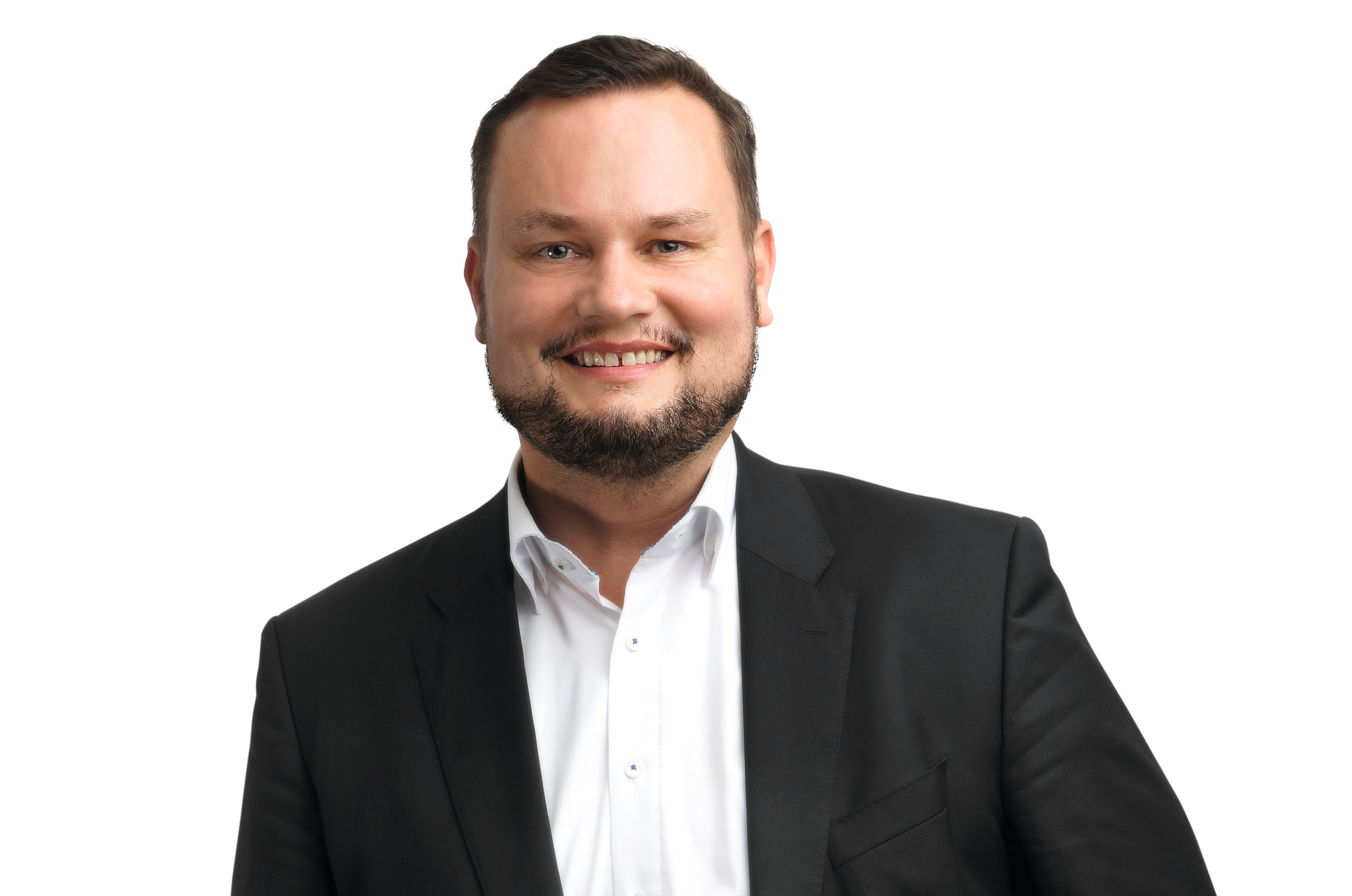
	First party	Second party	Third party
Candidate	Manuela Schwesig	Nikolaus Kramer	Michael Sack
Party	SPD	AfD	CDU
Last election	30.6%, 26 seats	20.8%, 18 seats	19.0%, 16 seats
Seats won	34	14	12
Seat change	▲8	▼4	▼4
Popular vote	361,769	152,775	121,583
Percentage	39.6%	16.7%	13.3%
Swing	▲9.0pp	▼4.1pp	▼5.7pp
	Fourth party	Fifth party	Sixth party
Candidate	Simone Oldenburg	Anne Shepley	René Domke
Party	Left	Greens	FDP
Last election	13.2%, 11 seats	4.8%, 0 seats	3.0%, 0 seats
Seats won	9	5	5
Seat change	▼2	▲5	▲5
Popular vote	90,881	57,554	52,963
Percentage	9.9%	6.3%	5.8%
Swing	▼3.2pp	▲1.5pp	▲2.8pp
- Results for the single-member constituencies
Government before election
First Schwesig cabinet
SPD–CDU
Government after election
Second Schwesig cabinet
SPD–Left

The 2021 Mecklenburg-Vorpommern state election was held on 26 September 2021 to elect the 8th Landtag of Mecklenburg-Vorpommern. The incumbent government was a coalition of the Social Democratic Party (SPD) and Christian Democratic Union (CDU) led by Minister President Manuela Schwesig.

The SPD won a landslide plurality of almost 40% of votes, a nine percentage point increase from 2016. The opposition Alternative for Germany (AfD) remained the second largest party but declined to under 17%. The CDU recorded its worst ever result in the state with 13.3%, while The Left also declined to 10%. Alliance 90/The Greens and the Free Democratic Party (FDP) both won around 6% of votes and re-entered the Landtag after previously falling out in 2016 and 2011, respectively.

After the election, the SPD chose to form a coalition with The Left rather than renew their government with the CDU. Schwesig was re-elected as Minister-President on 15 November with 41 votes out of 79.

== Election date ==
The Landtag is elected for a period of five years in accordance with Article 27 of the Constitution of Mecklenburg-Vorpommern. An election may be held between 58 and 61 months after the first sitting of the previous Landtag. As the 7th Landtag first sat on 4 October 2016, the election must be held between 4 August to 4 November 2021. It must take place on a Sunday.

On 12 January 2021, the state government designated 26 September as the date of the election, coinciding with the federal parliamentary election.

== Electoral system ==
The Landtag is elected via mixed-member proportional representation. 36 members are elected in single-member constituencies via first-past-the-post voting. 35 members are then allocated using compensatory proportional representation. Voters have two votes: the "first vote" for candidates in single-member constituencies, and the "second vote" for party lists, which are used to fill the proportional seats. The minimum size of the Landtag is 71 members, but if overhang seats are present, proportional leveling seats will be added to ensure proportionality. An electoral threshold of 5% of valid votes is applied to the Landtag; parties that fall below this threshold are excluded from the Landtag.

== Background ==
In the previous election held on 4 September 2016, the SPD remained the largest party with 30.6% of the vote, a loss of 5.0 percentage points. Alternative for Germany (AfD) contested their first election in Mecklenburg-Vorpommern, placing second with 20.8%. The CDU won 19.0%, a loss of 4.0 points, while The Left won 13.2%, a loss of 5.2 points.

The SPD–CDU coalition which had governed since 2006 retained its majority and was renewed for a third term.

== Parties ==
The table below lists parties currently represented in the 7th Landtag of Mecklenburg-Vorpommern.

Name		Ideology	Lead candidate	Leader(s)	2016 result	
Name		Ideology	Lead candidate	Leader(s)	Votes (%)	Seats
SPD	Social Democratic Party of Germany; Sozialdemokratische Partei Deutschlands	Social democracy	Manuela Schwesig	Manuela Schwesig	30.6%	26 / 71
AfD	Alternative for Germany; Alternative für Deutschland	Right-wing populism	Nikolaus Kramer	Leif-Erik Holm	20.8%	18 / 71
CDU	Christian Democratic Union of Germany; Christlich Demokratische Union Deutschlands	Christian democracy	Michael Sack	Michael Sack	18.0%	16 / 71
Linke	The Left; Die Linke	Democratic socialism	Simone Oldenburg	Torsten Koplin; Wenke Brüdgam	13.2%	11 / 71

== Campaign ==
=== Lead candidates ===
On 7 August 2020, the state CDU elected Michael Sack, district administrator of Vorpommern-Greifswald, as its new leader. He was also selected as the party's lead candidate for the 2021 state election.

On 28 January 2021, parliamentary group leader Simone Oldenburg was nominated as lead candidate for The Left.

== Opinion polling ==
Polling firm	Fieldwork date	Sample size	SPD	AfD	CDU	Linke	Grüne	FDP	Others	Lead
2021 state election	26 Sep 2021	–	39.6	16.7	13.3	9.9	6.3	5.8	8.4	22.9
INSA	20–24 Sep 2021	1,058	40	17	13	11	7	5	7	23
Wahlkreisprognose	18–23 Sep 2021	1,004	40	16	13.5	10	6	5	9.5	24
Forschungsgruppe Wahlen	20–22 Sep 2021	1,015	39	16	14	11	7	5.5	7.5	23
Forschungsgruppe Wahlen	13–16 Sep 2021	1,028	38	17	15	11	6	6	7	21
INSA	10–16 Sep 2021	1,064	40	18	12	11	7	6	6	22
Infratest dimap	13–15 Sep 2021	1,533	40	15	15	10	6	5	9	25
Wahlkreisprognose	4–9 Sep 2021	994	39	18	13	11	5.5	6	7.5	21
Infratest dimap	2–7 Sep 2021	1,153	39	17	14	10	6	7	7	22
Infratest dimap	19–24 Aug 2021	1,153	36	17	15	11	6	8	7	19
INSA	6–12 Aug 2021	1,000	28	17	18	14	8	7	8	10
INSA	16–22 Jul 2021	1,098	26	19	20	13	9	7	6	6
Wahlkreisprognose	14–21 Jul 2021	2,000	30	20	24	9	5	5	7	10
Infratest dimap	8–13 Jul 2021	1,159	27	16	23	12	7	7	8	4
INSA	21–30 Jun 2021	1,002	26	19	20	13	8	6	8	6
Infratest dimap	12–18 May 2021	1,245	23	17	21	11	14	6	8	2
Forsa	12–15 Jan 2021	1,002	26	14	24	16	10	3	7	2
Infratest dimap	18–21 Nov 2020	1,000	27	15	27	12	10	3	6	Tie
Infratest dimap	3–6 Jun 2020	1,004	24	15	29	13	10	4	5	5
Forsa	2–10 Jan 2020	1,002	19	19	20	14	13	5	10	1
Forsa	18–23 Sep 2019	1,002	22	20	21	12	12	5	8	1
Forsa	4–11 Jan 2019	1,007	22	18	22	16	10	4	8	Tie
Forsa	24 May–28 Jun 2018	1,002	25	22	18	16	8	4	7	3
Forsa	2–11 Jan 2018	1,001	28	19	20	15	5	5	8	8
INSA	30 Jun–14 Jul 2017	1,608	31.5	20.5	22.0	13.5	4.5	3.5	4.5	9.5
Forsa	9–16 Jan 2017	1,002	32	18	21	13	4	4	8	11
2016 state election	4 Sep 2016	–	30.6	20.8	18.0	13.2	4.8	3.0	5.6	9.8

== Results ==
Party	Constituency				Party list				Total seats	+/–
Party	Votes	%	+/–	Seats	Votes	%	+/–	Seats	Total seats	+/–
Social Democratic Party (SPD)	313,224	34.41	+4.99	34	361,769	39.59	+9.03	0	34	+8
Alternative for Germany (AfD)	163,962	18.01	–3.88	1	152,775	16.72	–4.10	13	14	–4
Christian Democratic Union (CDU)	157,403	17.29	–4.50	1	121,583	13.30	–5.68	11	12	–4
The Left (DIE LINKE)	106,189	11.67	–3.20	0	90,881	9.94	–3.23	9	9	–2
Alliance 90/The Greens (GRÜNE)	59,544	6.54	+1.73	0	57,554	6.30	+1.48	5	5	+5
Free Democratic Party (FDP)	56,951	6.26	+2.91	0	52,963	5.80	+2.75	5	5	+5
Human Environment Animal Protection Party	6,902	0.76	+0.76	0	15,212	1.66	+0.46	0	0	±0
Grassroots Democratic Party	16,319	1.79	New	0	15,221	1.67	New	0	0	New
Free Voters	18,324	2.01	+0.95	0	10,075	1.10	+0.51	0	0	±0
National Democratic Party	0	0.00	–	0	7,063	0.77	–2.24	0	0	±0
Die PARTEI	1,826	0.20	–0.11	0	7,023	0.77	+0.14	0	0	±0
Animal Protection Here!	0	0.00	New	0	3,883	0.42	New	0	0	New
Pirate Party Germany	1,774	0.19	+0.15	0	3,706	0.41	–0.08	0	0	±0
Free Horizon	2,491	0.27	–0.45	0	3,348	0.37	–0.45	0	0	±0
Independents for Citizen-oriented Democracy	558	0.06	New	0	2,331	0.26	New	0	0	New
Party for Health Research	0	0.00	New	0	2,030	0.22	New	0	0	New
Team Todenhöfer	0	0.00	New	0	1,631	0.18	New	0	0	New
The Humanists	0	0.00	New	0	1,105	0.12	New	0	0	New
Ecological Democratic Party	0	0.00	New	0	936	0.10	New	0	0	New
Alliance C – Christians for Germany	186	0.02	–0.02	0	827	0.09	–0.01	0	0	±0
German Communist Party	0	0.00	–	0	727	0.08	–0.08	0	0	±0
Democracy in Motion	0	0.00	New	0	563	0.06	New	0	0	New
Free Parliamentary Alliance	708	0.08	New	0	436	0.05	New	0	0	New
Liberal Conservative Reformers	0	0.00	–	0	221	0.02	–0.28	0	0	±0
Independents	3,808	0.42	–0.28	0	0	0.00	–	0	0	±0
Total	910,169	100.00	–	36	913,863	100.00	–	43	79	–
Valid votes	910,169	97.99	+0.24		913,863	98.39	+0.24			
Invalid/blank votes	18,638	2.01	–0.24		14,944	1.61	–0.24			
Total votes	928,807	100.00	–		928,807	100.00	–			
Registered voters/turnout	1,312,471	70.77	+8.92		1,312,471	70.77	+8.92			
Source: State Returning Officer

Popular vote
SPD	39.59%
AfD	16.72%
CDU	13.30%
LINKE	9.94%
GRÜNE	6.30%
FDP	5.80%
Other	8.35%

Landtag seats
SPD	43.04%
AfD	17.72%
CDU	15.19%
LINKE	11.39%
GRÜNE	6.33%
FDP	6.33%

SPD vote

AfD vote

CDU vote

Linke vote

Green vote

FDP vote

== Aftermath ==
Minister-President Schwesig claimed victory after the release of exit polls and spoke of "a wonderful evening for our state and the SPD." CDU leader Michael Sack and general-secretary Wolfgang Waldmüller both described the party's result as a "catastrophe". Despite the AfD's losses, state chairman Leif Erik-Holm voiced his satisfaction with the result, particularly the decline of the CDU. Simone Oldenburg, the lead candidate for The Left, stated that the result was a mandate for a shift to the left in the government. Harald Terpe of the Greens described their performance as "promising" but said that many of the party's key issues are still not a high priority for the state's voters.

=== Government formation ===
The SPD declined to commit to a coalition partner after the election, but a two-party government with either the CDU or The Left was mathematically possible. A traffic light coalition with the Greens and FDP also holds a majority. Minister President Schwesig described a "stable majority" with "reliable partners" as key to the formation of a new government.

On 13 October 2021, Schwesig announced the SPD would enter coalition talks with The Left. She stated her motivations for reorienting the coalition as a desire for "a new departure", and described The Left as a "social, pragmatic party" with decisive policy overlap with the SPD. She said that The Left had been a reliable partner to the government even while in opposition, and had assumed "state-political responsibility" during the COVID-19 pandemic.

A coalition agreement between the SPD and The Left was agreed to on 5 November and signed on 13 November. Schwesig was re-elected as Minister-President on 15 November with 41 votes in favour, 35 against, and three abstentions. In the new cabinet, the SPD has six ministers and the Left has two: Simone Oldenburg as education minister and Jaqueline Bernhardt as justice minister.
