= Third Schwesig cabinet =

Incumbent state government of Mecklenburg-Vorpommern

Third Cabinet of Manuela Schwesig Schwesig III
- 12th Cabinet of Mecklenburg-Vorpommern
- 16 November 2026 –
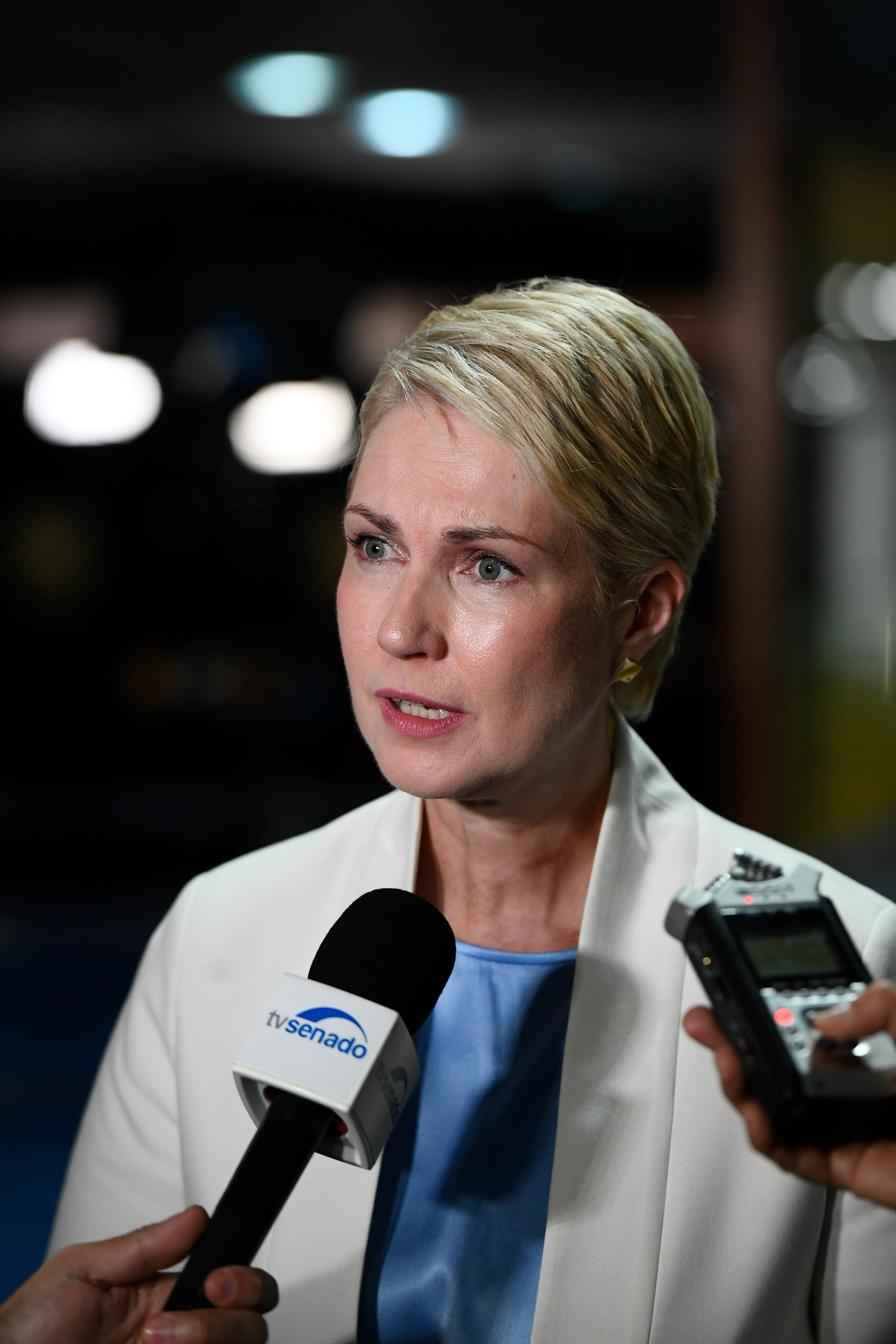
- Manuela Schwesig being interviewed on a state visit in Brazil in 2024
- Date formed: 16 November 2026

People and organisations
- Minister-President: Manuela Schwesig
- Deputy Minister-President: Kerstin Mieth
- No. of ministers: 9
- Member parties: Social Democratic Party; The Left; Alliance 90/The Greens
- Status in legislature: Coalition government (Majority)
- Opposition party: Alternative for Germany

History
- Election: 2026 Mecklenburg-Vorpommern state election
- Legislature term: 9th Landtag of Mecklenburg-Vorpommern
- Predecessor: Second Schwesig cabinet

The Third Schwesig cabinet is the incumbent state government of Mecklenburg-Vorpommern, sworn in on 16 November 2026 after Manuela Schwesig was elected as Minister-President of Mecklenburg-Vorpommern by the members of the Landtag of Mecklenburg-Vorpommern. It is the 12th Cabinet of Mecklenburg-Vorpommern.

It was formed after the 2026 Mecklenburg-Vorpommern state election by the Social Democratic Party (SPD), The Left (LINKE). and Alliance 90/The Greens (GRÜNE). Excluding the Minister-President, the cabinet comprises nine ministers. Six are members of the SPD and two are members of The Left and one is a member of Alliance 90/The Greens.

== Formation ==
The previous cabinet was a coalition government of the SPD and LINKE led by Manuela Schwesig of the SPD, who took office in July 2017.

The election took place on 20 September 2026, and resulted in a significant swing to the AfD, receiving the majority of votes. SPD, The Left and Grüne suffered slight losses, whilst CDU and FDP received less than the 5% threshold and left parliament.

Overall, the incumbent coalition was returned without a majority. However, SPD and The Left went into coalition talks with the Greens to form a new government.

Schwesig was elected as Minister-President by the Landtag on 16 November, winning 39 votes out of 68 cast.

== Composition ==
Portfolio	Minister	Party	Took office	Left office	State secretaries
Minister-President; State Chancellery	Manuela Schwesig born 23 May 1974 (age 52)	SPD	16 November 2026	Incumbent	
Deputy Minister-President Minister for Social Affairs, Labour and Health	Kerstin Mieth born 22 January 1972 (age 54)	LINKE	16 November 2026	Incumbent	
Second Deputy Minister-President Minister for Environment, Climate Protection, Energy and Mobility	Claudia Müller born 10 August 1981 (age 45)	GRÜNE	16 November 2026	Incumbent	
Minister for Interior	Christian Pegel born 7 January 1974 (age 52)	SPD	16 November 2026	Incumbent	
Minister for Finance	Carola Voß born 23 January 1963 (age 63)	SPD	16 November 2026	Incumbent	
Minister for Economics, Science and Research	Wolfgang Blank born 20 December 1959 (age 66)	Unaffiliated (nominated by SPD)	16 November 2026	Incumbent	
Minister for Education, Culture and Sport	Stefanie Drese born 9 December 1976 (age 49)	SPD	16 November 2026	Incumbent	
Minister for Justice	Michael Noetzel born 17 February 1975 (age 51)	LINKE	16 November 2026	Incumbent	
Minister for Food, Agriculture and Consumer Protection	Till Backhaus born 13 March 1959 (age 67)	SPD	16 November 2026	Incumbent	
Minister for Digitalisation, Federal and European Affairs in the State Chancellory; Head of the State Chancellory	Heiko Geue born 5 October 1965 (age 61)	SPD	16 November 2026	Incumbent	
