= Low German (school subject) =

Language taught in northern Germany

Low German is a school subject in the northern German states Hamburg, Schleswig-Holstein, Mecklenburg-Western Pomerania and Bremen. In these states, it is part of Compulsory elective area, but in Bremen only as part of a pilot project. In Lower Saxony, Low German is partly integrated into the teaching of other subjects, there is no separate school subject. In North Rhine-Westphalia, Brandenburg and Saxony-Anhalt, the northern parts of which belong to the Low German language area, there are voluntary Low German courses, mainly in the form of working groups. Low German is not taught across the board in any of the federal states; it is only offered at individual schools in the northern German states. In the Netherlands Low German is not generally given as a school subject, though the law gives the opportunity to teach in Low German alongside Standard Dutch. Occasionally Low German might be mentioned or being basically taught primarily on primary school and high school, especially during school subjects handling culture.

Low German has only been taught as a school subject for a few years, after the language had rapidly lost importance and was threatened with extinction. As the passing on of Low German as a mother tongue in the parental homes has now almost completely ceased, schools are now seen as the place where the language can be preserved. A decisive trigger for the establishment of Low German as a school subject was the European Charter for Regional or Minority Languages, which was ratified by the Federal Republic of Germany in 1998 and came into force in 1999. In addition to the languages of national minorities (Danish, Sorbian, Frisian and Romanes), Low German was also included in the group of Charter languages as a regional language. The Language Charter forms the international legal framework for language policy in Germany. The signatory states commit themselves to protect and promote regional and minority languages. The concrete measures agreed include, for example, making it possible to teach and study the respective language at university. In Mecklenburg-Western Pomerania and Schleswig-Holstein, the protection and promotion of Low German has also had constitutional status since 1993 and 1998 respectively. The constitution of the state of Schleswig-Holstein also expressly provides for the teaching of Low German in public schools.

Hamburg was the first federal state to introduce Low German as a regular school subject at individual elementary school in 2010, followed by Schleswig-Holstein and Bremen in 2014 and Mecklenburg-Western Pomerania in 2016. Since 2017, Low German has been an oral and written examination subject in the Abitur recognized by the Kultusministerkonferenz. Mecklenburg-Western Pomerania is the only state so far to have introduced corresponding lessons at upper secondary level.

== General conditions ==
=== Distribution and status of Low German ===
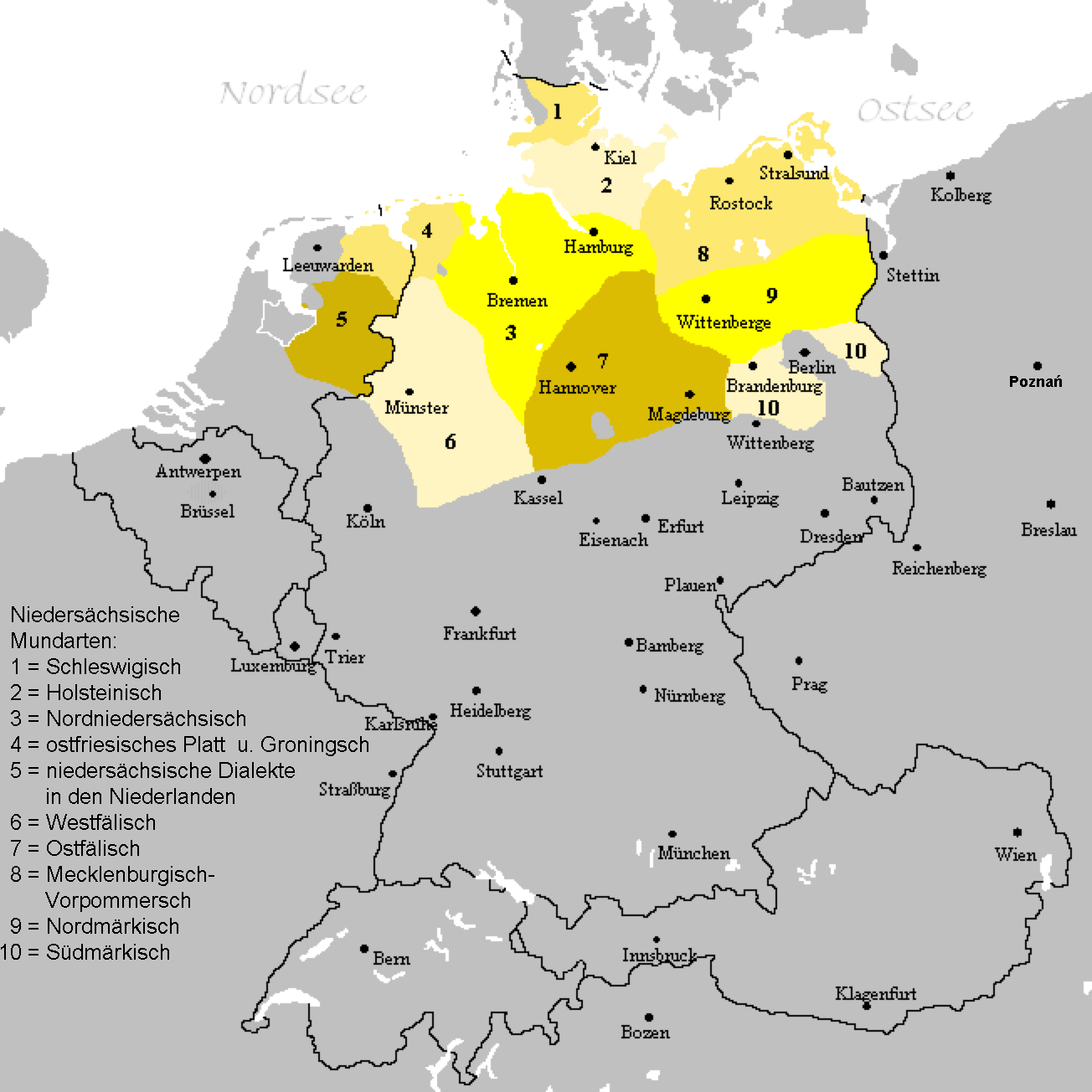
Distribution and dialectal classification of the Low German dialects

Starting in the cities in the 16th century, Early New High German gradually replaced Low German as the school language and educational language, church language, chancery language and written language in northern Germany. This process was largely complete by the 17th century. Standard German was increasingly used in public and official oral communication, but Low German remained the spoken folk language and everyday language. This resulted in bilingualism, with speakers switching between Low German and High German depending on the situation. A fluent transition to the standard language, as is typical of many dialects, was hardly pronounced. There was also a social differentiation between Low German and High German, which had a higher social prestige.

Today, Low German is spoken in the northern German states of Schleswig-Holstein, Hamburg, Mecklenburg-Western Pomerania, Bremen and Lower Saxony, as well as in the northern parts of North Rhine-Westphalia, Saxony-Anhalt and Brandenburg. Platt is spoken more frequently on the coasts and in smaller towns than in the cities and in the south of the region.

Today, just under half of the people living in the region say they understand Low German well or very well; only around 15% say they can speak it well or very well. In 1984, these figures were still 66% and 35% respectively in the north-western German states. In Schleswig-Holstein, 24.5% of respondents still speak Plattdeutsch well or very well, in Mecklenburg-Western Pomerania 20.7%, in Bremen 17.6%, in Lower Saxony 17.4% and in Hamburg 9.5%.

While the proportion of those who speak Low German well or very well is still more than half among the over-80s, it is less than one percent among the under-20s. 44% of active speakers stated that they learned Low German from their parents, 41% from their grandparents. However, today's generation of parents can no longer pass on the language, as only 4% of the 30-39 age group still speak Plattdeutsch well or very well. Only 5.5% of Low German speakers named school as the place or a place where they had learned Low German.

Although the absolute number of active speakers is still over two million, Low German is considered to be the most endangered of the recognized and protected minority and regional languages in Germany in view of this age structure, the fact that it is no longer taught in parents' homes and the fact that it has not been mainstreamed in schools for a long time.

=== The European Charter for Regional or Minority Languages ===
The Language Charter forms the international law framework for language policy in Germany. It has the status of a Federal Act. However, the European Charter for Regional or Minority Languages does not include the possibility of suing for language rights at the European Court of Human Rights or the Court of Justice of the European Union. Rather, it is dependent on incorporation into the legislation of the states. In Germany, Legislation in the area of education and language policy falls within the competence of the federal states.

The Charter specifies how and with what measures the Charter languages are to be promoted. The federal states protect Low German in accordance with either Part II or Part III of the Charter, taking into account the extent to which the language is spoken. Bremen, Hamburg, Schleswig-Holstein, Mecklenburg-Western Pomerania and Lower Saxony offer protection under Part III, which is much more comprehensive than Brandenburg, North Rhine-Westphalia and Saxony-Anhalt, which have each signed Part II of the Charter. The Committee of Ministers of the Council of Europe recommended making Low German a regular school subject, developing curricula, ensuring the continuity of teaching at all educational levels from pre-school to school-leaving certificate and training a sufficient number of teachers. The legal scholar Stefan Oeter, Chairman of the Council of Europe's Committee of Experts on the European Language Charter, emphasizes that the Charter includes an obligation to teach the respective protected regional or minority language in a separate subject. This obligation is set out in Part III, Art. 8 Para. 1 b.

The activities of the Council of Europe and the European Union to preserve cultural and linguistic diversity have given regional and minority languages a European dimension. The Charter has so far been ratified by 26 Council of Europe member states. 21 Council of Europe countries, including several EU countries such as France, Belgium, Italy, Portugal and Greece have not yet taken this step.

=== Low German in state constitutions ===
The protection and promotion of Low German has constitutional status in two federal states. Since 1993, Article 16 (2) of the Constitution of the State of Mecklenburg-Vorpommern states: The state protects and promotes the cultivation of Low German. In 1998, the Constitution of the State of Schleswig-Holstein adopted this passage in Article 13 (2) with the same wording. In addition, Article 12 (6) of Schleswig-Holstein's constitution states: The state protects and promotes the teaching of Frisian and Low German in public schools.

=== Supervisory bodies and interest groups ===
In the opinion of the Council of Europe, a supervisory body is necessary to monitor the implementation of the obligations arising from the Language Charter. This function is performed at federal level by the Federal Government Commissioner for Ethnic German Issues and National Minorities and an advisory committee for issues relating to the Low German language group at the Ministry of the Interior. At state level, Schleswig-Holstein, for example, has an Advisory Council for Low German at the state parliament and the Minister President's Minority Commissioner, who is also the Low German Commissioner. Mecklenburg-Western Pomerania has appointed a state commissioner for Low German, The Ministry of Education, Science and Culture also has an advisory board for local history and Low German.

== Low German as a regular school subject ==
=== Introduction of Low German as a school subject and recognition as an Abitur subject ===
The Language Charter was a turning point, as it called for the promotion of regional and minority languages under international law. In 2007, the Federal Council for Dutch, as the language policy representative of Low German speakers, published the "Schwerin Theses" with the central demand that Low German be anchored as a regular subject in the education plans of the federal states and thus fulfill the obligations arising from the Language Charter.

In 2010, Hamburg was the first federal state to introduce Low German as a primary school subject in Compulsory elective area. Schleswig-Holstein followed in 2014 and Bremen launched a pilot project. Low German has been a regular subject at lower secondary level in Mecklenburg-Western Pomerania since 2016. 2017 saw the Standing Conference of the Ministers of Education and Cultural Affairs (KMK) recognized Low German as an oral and written examination subject in the Abitur. The official inclusion of Low German in the list of mutually recognized, open-ended state-specific examination subjects in the Abitur examination was decided in March 2017 with 15 votes in favour and one abstention. The state of Mecklenburg-Vorpommern, represented by the then Minister of Education Mathias Brodkorb, had campaigned for recognition by the KMK school committee.

=== Educational concepts ===
The educational concepts for modern Low German lessons are only just being developed (as of 2018). The question of whether its methodological and didactic orientation should be based more on native German lessons or foreign language lessons has not yet been discussed. However, the existing framework plans take account of the dramatic decline in Low German as a mother tongue by focusing on language acquisition. They are no longer based on the assumption of a family background and the range of languages on offer is basically open to all pupils. The requirements are based on the Common European Framework of Reference for Languages.

The immersion method differs from conventional (foreign) language teaching in that other subjects are taught in Low German and the language is thus learned "incidentally". As a rule, the words are not translated, but understood from the context. Immersion thus works in the same way as first language acquisition and is considered a particularly effective language learning method. Immersive Low German lessons are mainly taught in Lower Saxony.

=== Teaching aids ===
For a long time, one of the biggest deficits in Low German lessons was the teaching materials. Their development is made more difficult by the fact that there is no standardized form of Low German, but that the language is characterized by a pronounced dialectal diversity. In addition, Low German is primarily practiced as a spoken language. There is no standardized or binding spelling. For school lessons, however, careful standardization of spelling and grammatical forms is essential. A common orthography for Low German texts in Germany is the "Plattdeutsche Wörterbuch" (Low German dictionary), first published by Johannes Saß in 1956 and revised in several editions since then. It applies primarily to the North Lower Saxon dialects, indicates deviations and is based on High German spelling.

A Low German workbook (Fietje Arbeitsbook) has been available in Hamburg since the 2013/2014 school year. for elementary school and the accompanying handout for teachers. In Schleswig-Holstein, Paul un Emma snackt Plattdüütsch has been available since the 2015/2016 school year. the first textbook for grades 1 and 2. The textbook is designed for systematic language acquisition and its level is based on modern foreign language teaching. It is structured in such a way that it can also be used in the other northern German states. The second volume Paul un Emma un ehr Frünnen for years 3 and 4 was published for the 2018/2019 school year. The volume was developed under the leadership of the Department of Low German Language and Literature and its Didactics at Europa-Universität Flensburg.

Mecklenburg-Vorpommern began developing extensive teaching materials in the 2016/2017 school year. Since November 2018, Paul un Emma snackt Plattdüütsch has also been available in Mecklenburg-Western Pomeranian Low German. The textbook Platt mit Plietschmanns, published in 2019, is designed for grades seven to twelve, but also for students and for the further training of professionals in childcare facilities. The concepts are developed primarily at the Competence Center for Low German Didactics at the University of Greifswald with the support of the Institute for Quality Development (IQ M-V) of the Ministry of Education and funded by the state.

=== Teacher training ===
One problem with Low German lessons is the lack of specialist teachers. When Low German was introduced as a school subject in Hamburg in the 2010/2011 school year, lessons were taught by teachers with a teaching qualification for German or a modern foreign language who were also active speakers of Low German. On request, the teachers were able to take advantage of annual support from the State Institute for Teacher Training and School Development.

Due to the age structure of the active Low German speakers, many Low German teachers also left the teaching profession for reasons of age, while only a few new ones joined. In Mecklenburg-Western Pomerania, for example, the number of teachers with a teaching qualification for Low German fell from 153 to 62 in just two years between 2014 and 2016.

Teacher training students can take Low German as a minor subject, supplementary subject, extension subject or as an elective or focus area in German. In December 2019, Lower Saxony's Minister of Science Björn Thümler announced that Low German would be offered as an undergraduate teacher training subject at the University of Oldenburg in the future. The Ministry has made 350,000 euros available annually for this purpose. An initial rough concept has been drawn up at the University of Oldenburg and a professorship has been advertised. Niederdeutsch auf Lehramt kann an folgenden Universitäten studiert werden:

- University of Greifswald: Low German as a subsidiary subject and teacher training
- Christian-Albrechts-Universität zu Kiel: Extension or supplementary subject, profile Low German for teaching at grammar schools and community schools as well as commercial teachers
- European University of Flensburg: Low German specialization in the learning area of Low German in the teacher training program
- Carl von Ossietzky University Oldenburg: Focus on Low German in German studies and teacher training, as a basic subject in the future
- Universität Rostock: individual modules in the German studies program; The establishment of a subsidiary subject of Low German in the teacher training program is being examined
- Universität Hamburg: Individual modules in German studies
- Universität Münster: Individual, more research-oriented modules in German studies

The universities also offer further trainings for active Low German teachers. In 2017, the state of Mecklenburg-Western Pomerania established a competence center for Low German didactics at the University of Greifswald to strengthen the existing training, further education and training of teachers and specialists in child daycare facilities, which will be supported with a total of 447,580 euros until 2020. Schleswig-Holstein and Mecklenburg-Western Pomerania give preference to teachers who can teach Low German, provided they have the same qualifications. In addition to university training, there are further training courses at state institutes, e.g. at the Institute for Quality Development in Schwerin or at the Studienseminar für das Lehramt an Grund-, Haupt- und Realschulen in Cuxhaven.

== Situation in the individual federal states ==
=== States with Low German as a compulsory elective subject ===
==== Hamburg ====
Hamburg elementary school with Low German as a compulsory elective subject
Aueschule Finkenwerder
Westerschule Finkenwerder
Arp-Schnitger-Stieg School (Neuenfelde)
School Cranz
School Altengamme-Deich
School Curslack-Neuengamme
School Fünfhausen-Warwisch
School Zollenspieker
Primary School Kirchwerder
School Ochsenwerder

In the 2010/2011 school year, Hamburg was the first federal state to introduce Low German as a regular primary school subject in the compulsory elective area with its own framework plan and to anchor it in the timetable. This was the first time that there were binding educational plans for Low German as a subject. Eleven Hamburg elementary school in the rural regions of Finkenwerder, Neuenfelde, Cranz, Vier- und Marschlande offer Low German as an independent school subject. In the first two classes, pupils have one lesson of Low German per week, in the third and fourth classes two. Since 2014/2015, Low German has been continued as a regular subject with its own curricula for grades 5 to 11 at Stadtteilschule and for Sekundarstufe I at Gymnasium.

==== Schleswig-Holstein ====
In Schleswig-Holstein, a pilot project was launched in the 2014/2015 school year in which 27 elementary schools introduced a voluntary Low German elective course. This comprises two lessons per week of systematic Low German instruction from first to fourth grade.

The available budget provided for 27 participating schools, but 44 schools applied, making a qualitative selection process necessary. Due to high demand, two new schools were added in the 2015/2016 school year. In the second year of the pilot project, around 1600 pupils chose Low German. Systematic teaching of Low German was continued at seven secondary schools (six Community schools and one grammar school) in the 2017/2018 school year, the number of pupils has risen to 2170. In 2019/2020, more than 3,000 pupils at 32 elementary school and 9 secondary schools took part in voluntary Low German lessons.

==== Mecklenburg-Vorpommern ====
As recently as 2014, Reinhard Goltz, managing director of the Institute for Low German and spokesperson for the Bundsraat för Nedderdüütsch, stated that although Mecklenburg-Vorpommern had created a good legal framework for the inclusion of Low German in school lessons, it was not being implemented in practice. With the adoption of the state program "MA home - My modern Mecklenburg-Vorpommern". In 2016, however, the state government took the promotion of Low German to a new level. This state program focuses on teaching Low German in schools. The resources used benefit the strengthening of Low German education in the areas of early childhood education, primary and secondary education, vocational and higher education, educator and teacher training as well as cultural education and project funding.

Low German has been offered as a regular subject in Mecklenburg-Vorpommern since 2016. Recognition as an Abitur subject by the Conference of Ministers of Education and Cultural Affairs came about on the initiative of Mecklenburg-Vorpommern. When it was introduced as an Abitur subject, the Ministry of Education under Mathias Brodkorb had still spoken of Low German as a foreign language and thus the other languages English taught in Mecklenburg-Western Pomerania, French, Russian, Latin, Old Greek, Polish, Spanish and Swedish. In March 2017, the Ministry of Education under Brodkorb's successor Birgit Hesse revised this statement in an answer to a minor interpellation. Low German should not replace the acquisition of either a first or a second foreign language at school. However, Hesse emphasized that Low German is fundamentally equal to other subjects and is no longer an additional subject.

Profile schools with a focus on Low German in Mecklenburg-Vorpommern
Secondary school center "Fritz Reuter" Dömitz
Wismar City School
Jigh School „Am Sonnenberg“ Crivitz
RecknitzCampus Laage
Reuterstädter Comprehensive School Stavenhagen (KGS)
Goethe-Gymnasium Demmin (music high school)

In the 2017/2018 school year, the federal state established profile schools with three focal points: Humanistic Education/Ancient Languages, Mathematics/Science (MINT) or Low German, with the aim of expanding gifted education at grammar schools and comprehensive schools. The profile schools have each received an additional teaching position to develop the respective focus and have a budget for material and travel expenses. Six schools have been recognized as profile schools with a focus on Low German. At these schools, Low German can be taken as an oral and written examination subject in the Abitur. Based on a state-wide concept developed by a network of teachers, the Ministry of Education, Science and Culture has signed a target agreement with each school on the design of the respective profile focus. The subject of Low German from Year 7 to the Qualification phase is based on corresponding framework plans, which are based on the educational standards of the Standing Conference of the Ministers of Education and Cultural Affairs.

In the first year after their introduction, 615 pupils attend Low German lessons at the six profile schools. This corresponds to a third of all seventh graders at these schools. In addition, elementary school that pursue an all-day school concept must include Low German courses in their profile. In total, around 2100 pupils in Mecklenburg-Vorpommern learned Low German at school in the 2019/20 school year. The first Abitur examinations in Low German will be held in 2023.

In 2017, there were 62 teachers across the country who were qualified to teach Low German. In order to increase this number, a competence center for Low German didactics was established at the University of Greifswald. The competence center complements the services offered by the Institute for Quality Development in Schwerin. It will also accompany the state's Low German competition.

==== Bremen ====
Schools with a Low German profile in Bremen
School Schönebeck
School Arsten
Elementary school Mahndorf
Burgdamm school
Veern SchoolBremerhaven

In the 2014/15 school year, a pilot project was launched that enables elementary school in the Free Hanseatic City of Bremen to set up an additional compulsory teaching program for all or some of their pupils. Four elementary school in Bremen and one in Bremerhaven are implementing this and have each developed a systematic concept. There is no standardized curriculum. After the end of the pilot phase of the Low German profile schools in the primary sector at the end of the 2017/2018 school year, the language offer will be systematically continued at at least two secondary schools.

=== Immersive Low German lessons ===
==== Lower Saxony ====
Lower Saxony has not adopted specific Charter obligations in the area of education, although it has signed Part III of the Language Charter. The only binding commitment since 2006 has been a language encounter with Low German for all schools and school types at primary and lower secondary level. Stefan Oeter, Chairman of the Council of Europe's Committee of Experts on the European Language Charter, judged in 2009 that Lower Saxony had until then "deliberately avoided the core options for primary and secondary education, which is a unique peculiarity in Europe".

For a long time, the teaching of Low German was limited to school study groups and extracurricular activities. The Low German reading competition organized by the Lower Saxony Savings Bank Foundation every two years since 1979, in which several thousand pupils take part, plays an important role.

In 2011, a decree opened up the possibility of teaching Plattdeutsch or Sater Frisan in the subjects on the compulsory timetable or in compulsory elective subjects, with the exception of German, mathematics and foreign languages, at primary and lower secondary level. The immersion method is therefore predominantly used, i. e. that Low German is learned "on the side" in lessons of other subjects.

By 2016, 21 elementary school, one Oberschule and one Realschule had been awarded the title of "Plattdeutsche Schule" (Low German school) because regular language learning is part of their school program. There is a corresponding award for "Sater Frisian schools". In 2017, 71 schools received relief hours to initiate the acquisition of Low German in regular lessons. Two years later, there were already 90 project schools. The schools are largely free in the design of the decree. For example, in some bilingual classes at the Simonswolde elementary school in East Frisia, only Low German is spoken except in German and English lessons.

A trend towards a stronger anchoring of Low German in the education system emerged in June 2017 with a joint motion for a resolution by CDU, SPD, Grünen and FDP in the Lower Saxony state parliament. As a result, the state government decided to anchor Low German more firmly in the education system and establish a separate subject as a foreign language in the compulsory elective section of lower and upper secondary schools.

=== Countries with Low German support outside the classroom ===
==== North Rhine-Westphalia ====
In the administrative district of Münster, a school project has been running since the 2014/2015 school year, initially for five years, which is being supported by the Center for Low German at the University of Münster. As part of this school project, six elementary school in Münster and the Münsterland Münsterland are offering Low German on a trial basis in voluntary study groups. The establishment of Low German as a regular school subject is not planned in North Rhine-Westphalia.

==== Saxony-Anhalt ====
At primary and secondary schools in Saxony-Anhalt, the language encounter with Low German mainly takes place in study groups. The state government of Saxony-Anhalt is not planning to introduce Low German as a regular school subject. Currently (as of February 2024), 135 children in eight elementary school take part in Plattdeutsch-AGs. Since the 2023/24 school year, the Land Sachsen-Anhalt and the Landesheimatbund Sachsen-Anhalt have been supporting the continued existence of these AGs financially by paying an honorary allowance to the teachers and educational staff and ideally by providing teaching materials, networking opportunities and further training events at the Low German department at the Otto von Guericke University Magdeburg.

==== Brandenburg ====
The state of Brandenburg is also not aiming to establish a separate Low German subject. The state representatives of Brandenburg in the Bundesraat för Nedderdüütsch criticize the fact that the Brandenburg state government apparently regards the European Charter for Regional or Minority Languages it has signed as non-binding and purely symbolic. It has not taken any steps to strengthen the Low German language by creating concrete political framework conditions and measures and to recognize multilingualism in the north of Brandenburg as a characteristic of regional identity. However, the state government now sees a "particular need for action" and wants to promote Low German more strongly in accordance with the Language Charter. In four Uckermark elementary school in Prenzlau and Templin offer lessons in Low German. The first primary school workbook approved in Brandenburg for learning Low German, "Plattdütsch foer ju", was published in Prenzlau in 2017.

== Debate about the need for a Low German school subject ==
=== Discussion about the value and benefits of Low German ===
In a representative survey conducted in 2016 in the area where Low German is spoken, a good 2/3 of respondents were in favor of promoting the language more strongly. In Mecklenburg-Western Pomerania (84.5%), Bremen (83.9%) and Schleswig-Holstein (76.2%), the figure was significantly higher, in Hamburg it was 70.5% and in Lower Saxony 65%. The reputation of Low German has changed considerably in recent decades. It now enjoys a high level of social prestige as a symbol of identity, particularly in urban areas, especially in Hamburg.

=== The school as the place of language acquisition ===
As the transmission of the endangered language as a mother tongue in families has been broken off nowadays, the conviction has increasingly prevailed since the 1990s that the endangered language can only be saved through systematic language acquisition at school. In 2016, around 2/3 of respondents to a survey named school as the most suitable place for language acquisition. This completely reversed the role ascribed to schools for Low German, as the language shift from Low German to High German had primarily taken place through school lessons. Until the 1970s, school was the place where many Low German native speakers first came into contact with High German, which they learned there as if it were a foreign language. Singer Ina Müller, born in 1965, recounts the traumatic experience of initially barely understanding the High German spoken at school and only speaking Low German herself.

=== Tension between High German and Low German ===
Critics fear that Low German lessons are being taught at the expense of High German. Simone Oldenburg, education policy spokesperson for the parliamentary group Die Linke im Schweriner Landtag, rejected the subject of Low German on the grounds that the acquisition of standard German should be the priority. Proponents counter that the idea that Low German speakers speak poorer High German is based on outdated conditions, when Low German native speakers learned High German like a foreign language. Awareness of language change and language varieties are much more valuable for German lessons.

=== Linguistic integration ===
The criticism that Low German makes language integration more difficult for children with a migration background is countered by pointing out that immigrants are not affected by a compulsory elective subject in Low German, but can receive parallel remedial lessons in German or mother tongue lessons. In some cases, Low German lessons can even promote integration, as children who have grown up bilingually are already used to dealing with multilingualism and pupils of German origin have to learn Low German just like they do. One example of this type of integration is the presenter Yared Dibaba, who immigrated from Ethiopia as a child and later became famous for his Low German television and radio programs and books. Children from families of Indian, Russian or Chinese origin have also often done particularly well in Low German reading competitions in recent years.

=== Effects on foreign language teaching ===
Another fear is that regular Low German lessons would lead to a loss of resources for learning other foreign languages. On the other hand, advocates believe that multilingualism is fundamentally a good prerequisite for learning other languages and language flexibility, for cognitive development and for abstract thinking. In the case of early multilingualism, a common pool is created for all languages learned, from which all languages benefit. Learning several languages at the same time in early childhood thus facilitates the acquisition of further languages.

Educational scientists point out that for children, a local language in particular can lead to the same intensive language acquisition that is later made possible by stays abroad. In contrast, everyday contact with a more distant world language in early childhood is usually so limited that only one language encounter takes place.

== Low German as a school subject in the Netherlands ==
In the Netherlands Low German is currently not widely given as a school subject. The law gives the opportunity to use Low German or to use Low German as a course on school. Sporadically, there may be teaching about Low German on primary school and high school. Guest lessons might be given on mbo and hbo. On the mbo schools in Doetinchem (ROC het Graafschap College) and Drenthe (Drenthe College) the course 'Ontdek Nedersaksisch' (Discover Low German) is given which is a course students can choose. It educates people on the Low German language, culture, traditions and the use of it in the workfield. The course is also given under a different name on the Deltion College.

Plans exist to give the Twents variety of Low German as a school subject on the Twickel College.

== General references ==
- Auf dem Stundenplan: Plattdeutsch, Publications of the Institute for Low German Language 45, published by the Bundesraat för Nedderdüütsch, editors: Christiane Ehlers, Reinhard Goltz and Walter Henschen, Verlag Schuster Leer, Bremen 2013, ISBN 978-3-7963-0395-1.(pdf; 1.4 MB).
- Ulf-Thomas Lesle: Identitätsprojekt Niederdeutsch. Die Definition von Sprache als Politikum. In: Robert Langhanke (ed.): Language, Literature, Space. Festschrift for Willy Diercks. Publishing house for regional history, Bielefeld 2015, ISBN 978-3-89534-867-9, p. 693–741.
- Dieter Möhn: Niederdeutsch in der Schule, in: Handbuch zur niederdeutschen Sprach- und Literaturwissenschaft, herausgegeben von Gerhard Cordes und Dieter Möhn, Erich-Schmidt-Verlag, Berlin 1983, ISBN 3-503-01645-7.
- Plattdeutsch in der Schule. Symposion an der Carl-von-Ossietzky-Universität Oldenburg am 3. September 2004.Published by Spieker, Heimatbund für Niederdeutsche Kultur, Isensee Verlag, Oldenburg 2005, ISBN 3-89995-182-4.
- Sechster Bericht der Bundesrepublik Deutschland gemäß Artikel 15 Absatz 1 der Europäischen Charta der Regional- oder Minderheitensprachen, published by the Federal Ministry of the Interior, undated, 2017 (pdf; 2.4 MB).
