= Katy Hoffmeister =

German politician (born 1973)

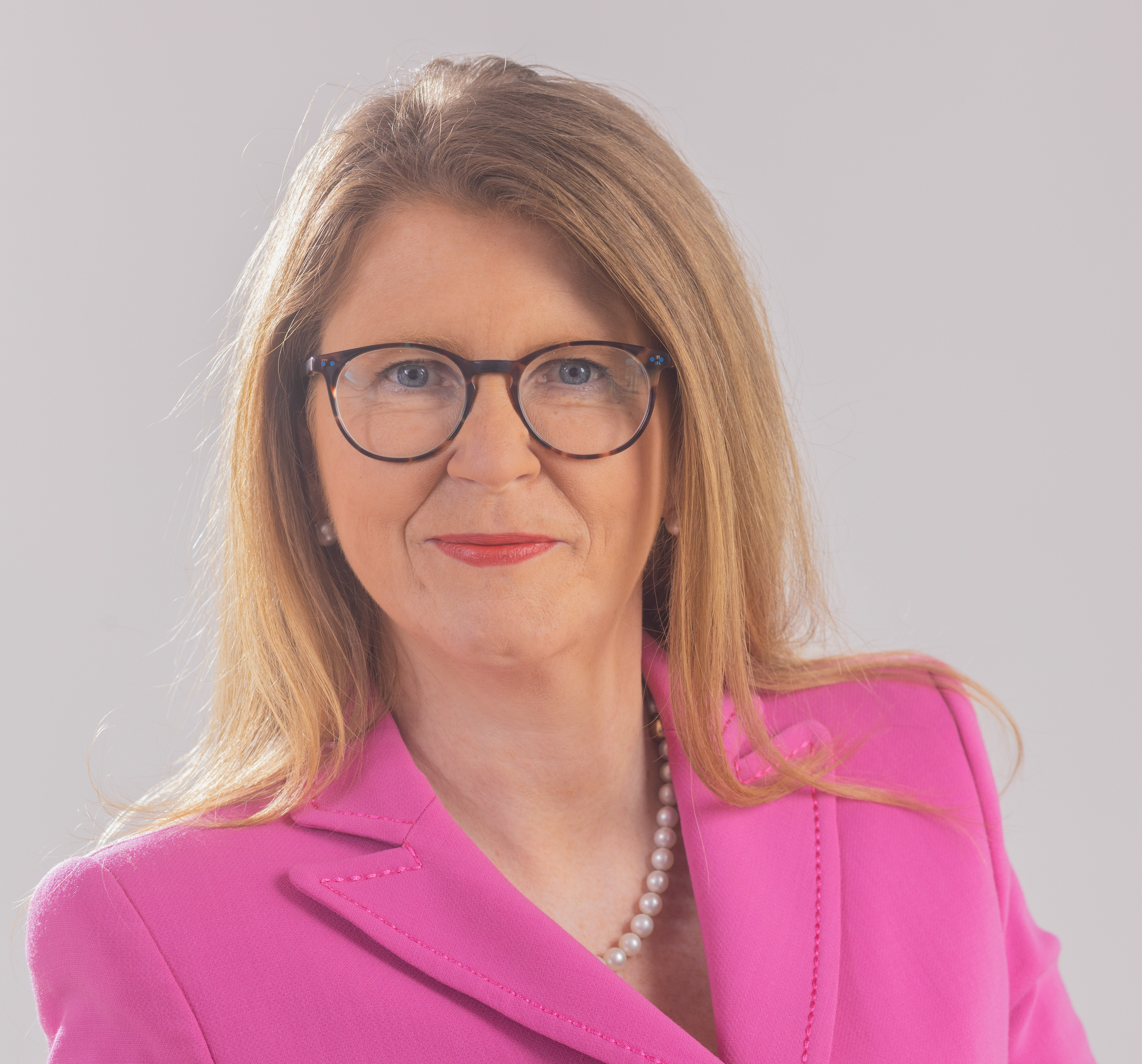
- Hoffmeister in 2021

Minister of Justice of Mecklenburg-Vorpommern
- In office 1 November 2016 – 15 November 2021
- Minister-President: Erwin Sellering; Manuela Schwesig
- Preceded by: Uta-Maria Kuder
- Succeeded by: Jacqueline Bernhardt

Personal details
- Born: 17 April 1973 (age 53)
- Party: Christian Democratic Union (since 1999)

Katy Hoffmeister (born 17 April 1973) is a German politician serving as a member of the Landtag of Mecklenburg-Vorpommern since 2021. She has served as secretary general of the Christian Democratic Union in Mecklenburg-Vorpommern since 2025. From 2016 to 2021, she served as minister of justice of Mecklenburg-Vorpommern.
