= Anne Shepley =

German politician (born 1979)

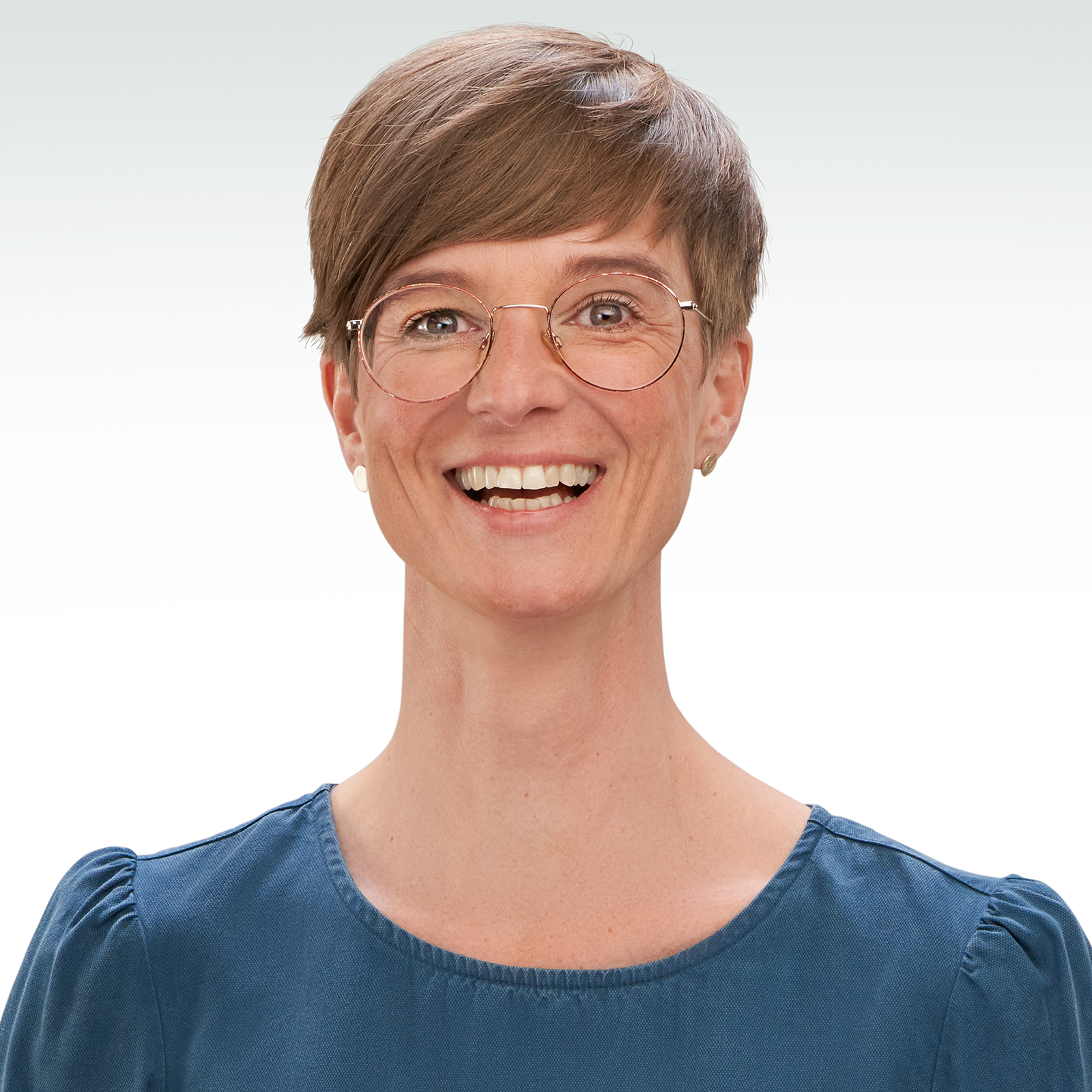
- Shepley in 2021

Member of the Landtag of Mecklenburg-Vorpommern
- Incumbent
- Assumed office 26 October 2021

Personal details
- Born: 2 July 1979 (age 47)
- Party: Alliance 90/The Greens (since 2018)

Anne Shepley (born 2 July 1979) is a German politician serving as a member of the Landtag of Mecklenburg-Vorpommern since 2021. In the 2021 state election, she was the lead candidate of Alliance 90/The Greens.
