= Gordon Hoffmann =

German politician (born 1978)

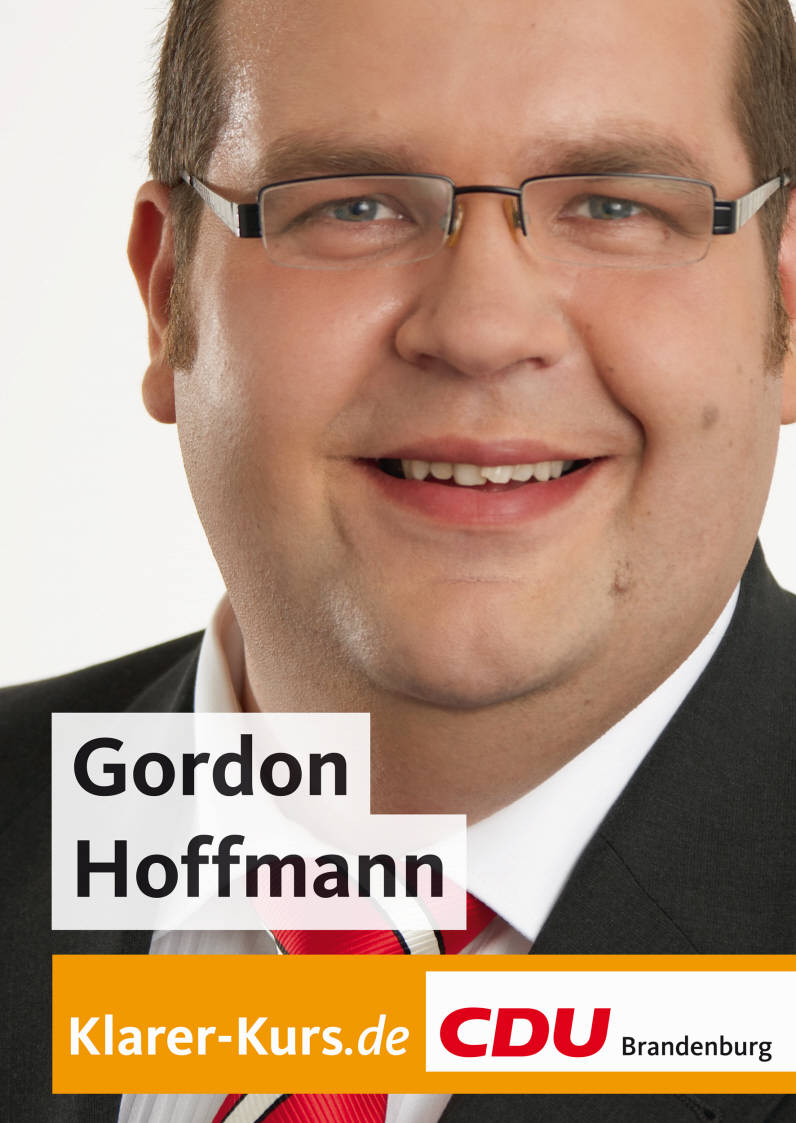
- Hoffmann in 2009

Minister of Education, Youth and Sport of the state of Brandenburg
- Incumbent
- Assumed office 18 March 2026
- Preceded by: Steffen Freiberg

Member of the Landtag of Brandenburg
- Incumbent
- Assumed office 21 October 2009

Personal details
- Born: 31 December 1978 (age 47)
- Party: Christian Democratic Union (since 2004)

Gordon Hoffmann (born 31 December 1978) is a German politician serving as a member of the Landtag of Brandenburg since 2009. He has served as secretary general of the Christian Democratic Union in Brandenburg since 2019.

On March 18, 2026, Hoffmann became minister of education.
