= Simone Oldenburg =

German politician (born 1969)

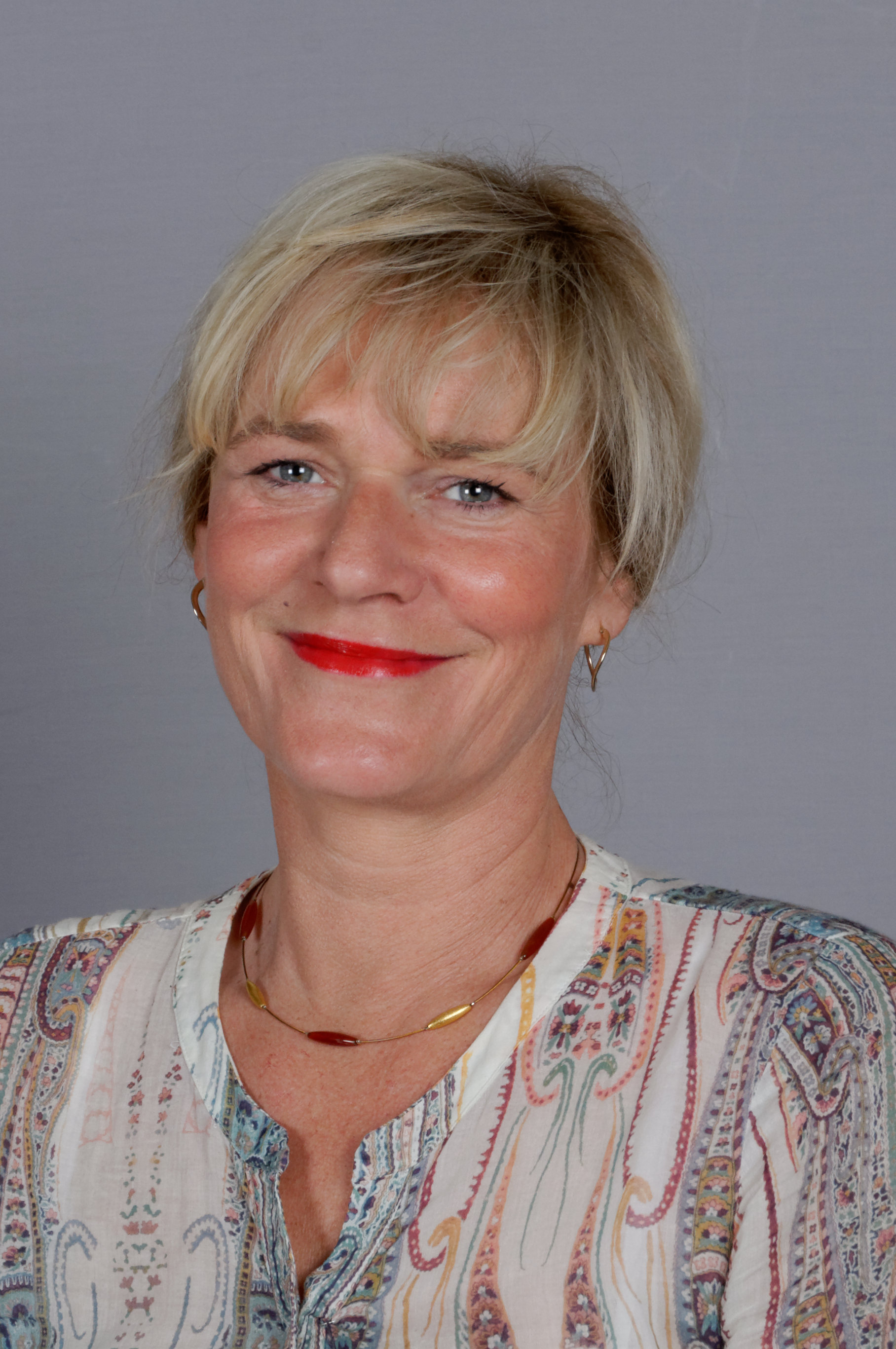
- Oldenburg in 2017.

Deputy Minister President of Mecklenburg-Vorpommern
- Incumbent
- Assumed office 15 November 2021
- Minister President: Manuela Schwesig
- Preceded by: Harry Glawe

Minister for Education of Mecklenburg-Vorpommern
- Incumbent
- Assumed office 15 November 2021
- Preceded by: Bettina Martin

Leader of The Left in the Landtag of Mecklenburg-Vorpommern
- Incumbent
- Assumed office September 2016
- Deputy: Jeannine Rösler; Jacqueline Bernhardt
- Preceded by: Helmut Holter

Deputy Leader of The Left
- Incumbent
- Assumed office 9 June 2018

Deputy Leader of The Left in the Landtag of Mecklenburg-Vorpommern
- In office 27 September 2011 – September 2016
- Leader: Helmut Holter
- Succeeded by: Jeannine Rösler; Jacqueline Bernhardt

Member of the Landtag of Mecklenburg-Vorpommern
- Incumbent
- Assumed office 4 September 2011
- Constituency: List

Personal details
- Born: Simone Oldenburg; 22 March 1969 (age 57) Wismar, East Germany
- Party: The Left (2007–present); PDS (before 2007)
- Education: Leipzig University

Simone Oldenburg (born 22 March 1969) is a German politician of The Left who has been Deputy Minister-President of Mecklenburg-Vorpommern since 2021. She has been a member of the Landtag of Mecklenburg-Vorpommern since 2011, and served as parliamentary leader of The Left since September 2016. Since June 2018, she has also been co-deputy leader of the federal party. Oldenburg was The Left's lead candidate for the 2021 state election.

== Early life and education ==
Simone Oldenburg was born in 1969 in Wismar. After graduating from high school there, she first completed a teaching degree in German and history at the Leipzig University of Education, then at the University of Leipzig in 1994. She then worked as a teacher at the regional school in Klütz.

== Political career ==
Oldenburg has been a member of the municipal council of Gägelow since 2004, and since 2009 of the Nordwestmecklenburg district council. She was elected to the state Landtag in the 2011 state election, second on The Left party list. She also ran unsuccessfully in the direct mandate of Nordwestmecklenburg I. After the constituent session of parliament, she became deputy leader of the party's parliamentary group.

She was re-elected in the 2016 state election. After the election, she was elected leader of The Left's parliamentary group. She was elected deputy chair of the federal Left party at a conference in June 2018. In 2021, she was nominated as lead candidate for the upcoming state election.

The Left won 9.9% of votes in the election, placing fourth. After the election, Oldenburg stated that the landslide victory of the Social Democratic Party called for a shift to the left in government. On 13 October, the SPD entered coalition talks with the Left. The parties successful agreed to a coalition government, and Oldenburg was sworn in as Deputy Minister-President and education minister on 15 November.
