= Michael Sack =

German politician

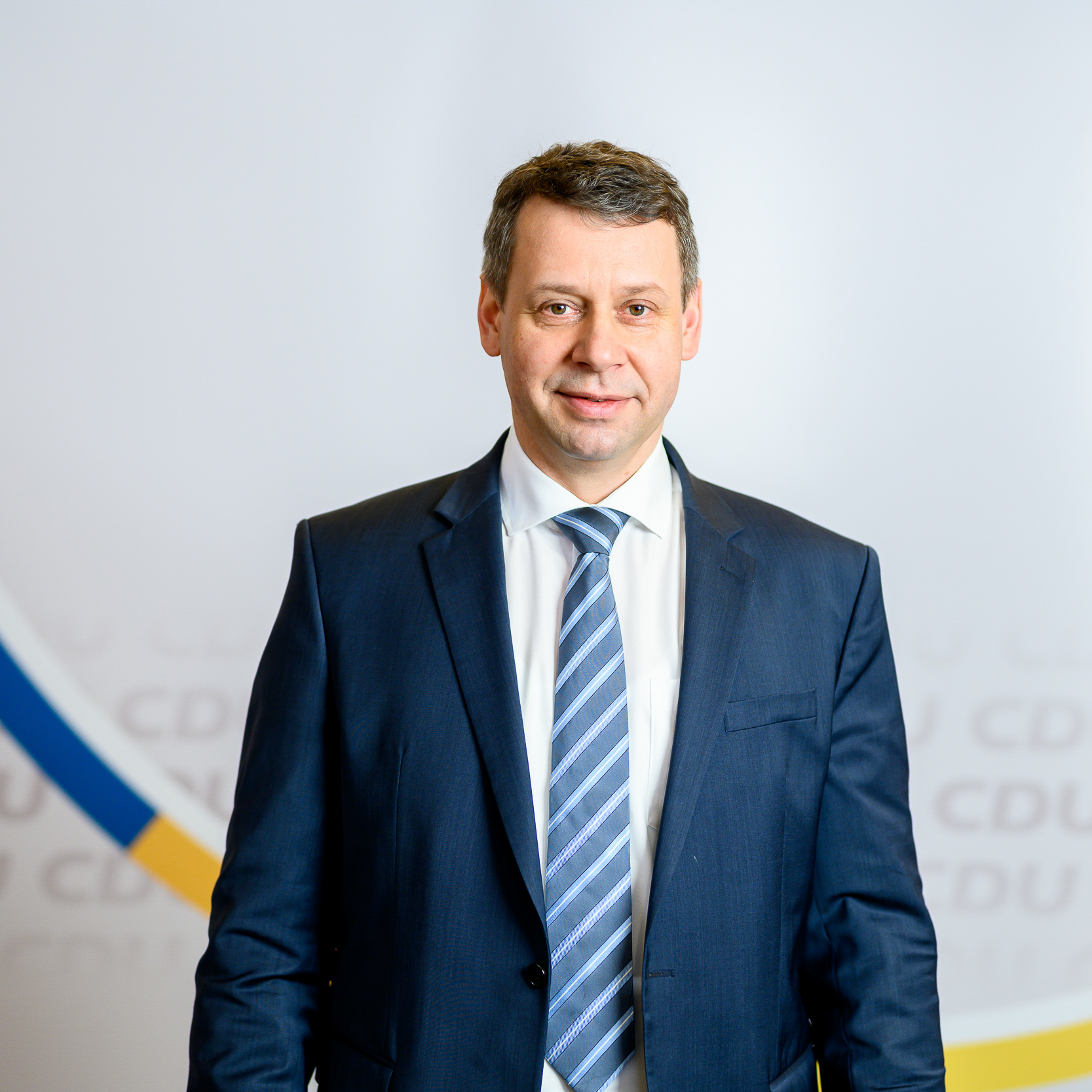
- Sack in 2021

Leader of the Christian Democratic Union in Mecklenburg-Vorpommern
- In office 7 August 2020 – 27 September 2021
- Preceded by: Vincent Kokert
- Succeeded by: Eckhardt Rehberg (acting)

District administrator of Vorpommern-Greifswald
- Incumbent
- Assumed office October 2018

Personal details
- Born: Michael Sack; 9 August 1973 (age 52) Demmin, East Germany
- Party: Christian Democratic Union
- Children: 3

Michael Sack (born 9 August 1973) is a German politician of the Christian Democratic Union (CDU). From August 2020 to September 2021, he was leader of the party's Mecklenburg-Vorpommern branch. Previously, he was district administrator of Vorpommern-Greifswald. He was the CDU's lead candidate for the 2021 Mecklenburg-Vorpommern state election, and subsequently resigned as party leader.

== Personal life ==
Michael Sack grew up in Groß Toitin near Jarmen. After an apprenticeship as a draftsman, he completed a degree in civil engineering. Until 2010 he worked as a vocational school teacher. He is married and has three children.

== Political career ==
In 2010, Sack was elected mayor of Loitz and also took over the administration of the Peenetal/Loitz office. The following year, he was elected district council president of Vorpommern-Greifswald, which was newly created in the course of the Mecklenburg-Western Pomerania district reform in 2011. He was re-elected as mayor of Loitz with 94% of votes in the 2017 local elections.

In December 2017, the CDU district association of Vorpommern-Greifswald nominated Sack as its candidate for the 2018 district election. In the election on 27 May 2018, Michael Sack received the most votes, 41.5%, ahead of the second-placed AfD candidate who won 15.7%. In the runoff election on 10 June, Sack won in a landslide with 79.5%. Michael Sack took up his post as district administrator in October.

On 19 June 2020, Sack announced his candidacy for the state CDU leadership. At a special party congress in Güstrow on 7 August, he was elected with 94.8% of the vote. He was also chosen as the party's lead candidate for the next state election. The CDU won just 13.3% of votes in the election, a decline of almost six percentage points. Sack subsequently resigned as party leader and waived his Landtag mandate.
