= Nikolaus Kramer =

German politician (born 1976)

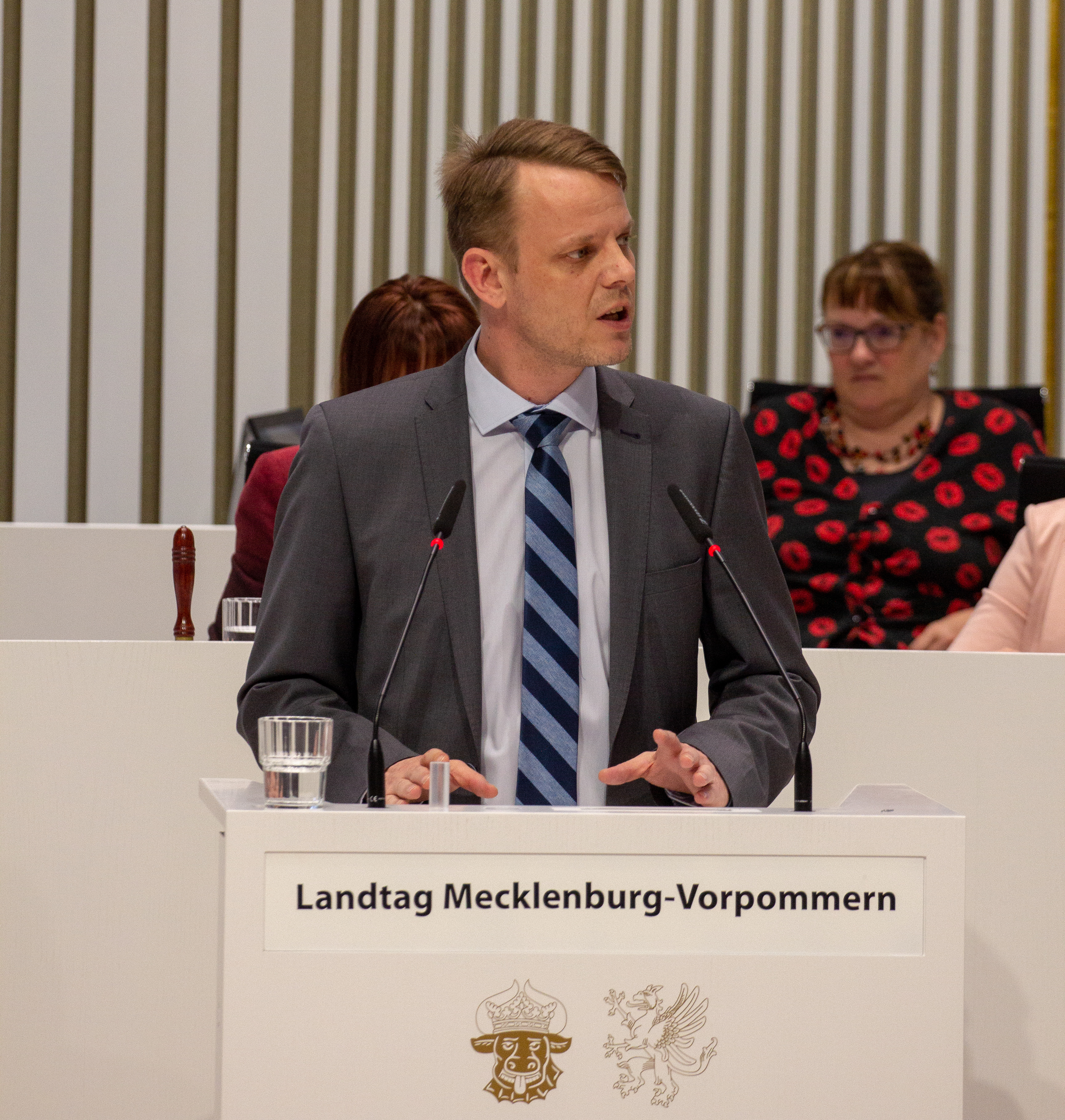
- Kramer in 2019

Member of the Landtag of Mecklenburg-Vorpommern
- Incumbent
- Assumed office 4 October 2016
- Constituency: List

Leader of the Opposition and the AfD faction in the Landtag of Mecklenburg-Vorpommern
- Incumbent
- Assumed office 10 October 2017
- Preceded by: Leif-Erik Holm

Personal details
- Born: 6 December 1976 (age 49) Greifswald, East Germany
- Party: Alternative for Germany
- Children: 1
- Website: nikolauskramer.de

Nikolaus Kramer (born 6 December 1976) is a German politician who has served as a member of the Landtag of Mecklenburg-Vorpommern for the Alternative for Germany (AfD) since 2016.

== Early life ==
Kramer was born on 6 December 1976 in Greifswald. He has noted that his mother is Lithuanian, making him half-Lithuanian. Kramer attended the Karl-Krull-Schule school in Greifswald between 1983 and 1994, after which he would serve as a soldier in the German Air Force and completed an apprenticeship as an office clerk at the Bundeswehr by July 2000. He served in the Mecklenburg-Vorpommern state police force from August 2000 until being elected to the Landtag for the AfD in 2016.

== Political career ==
Kramer joined the AfD on 22 May 2013. He served as a member of the Greifswald city council for the AfD since being elected in 2014, also leading the AfD faction in the city parliament.

During the 2016 Mecklenburg-Vorpommern state election, Kramer unsuccessfully contested in the constituency of Greifswald, winning only 19.9% of the vote. Instead, he was elected to the Landtag of Mecklenburg-Vorpommern through the party list on which he was placed eighth. Since November of that year, Kramer served on the board of the state section of the AfD. Kramer assumed the position of AfD faction leader in the Landtag on 10 October 2017, succeeding Leif-Erik Holm as Holm had been elected to the Bundestag. As AfD faction leader, Kramer also became the leader of the opposition in the Landtag.

Kramer was reelected during the 2021 Mecklenburg-Vorpommern state election through the party list on which he was placed first. Although contesting in the Vorpommern-Greifswald IV constituency, he again failed to win it, this time achieving 28.0% of the vote. He was reelected as the faction leader in 2024.

== Views ==
In a 2016 article, Die Zeit alleged that Kramer was using an alternate profile on Facebook where he shared pages of right-wing Burschenschaften and the Identitarian Movement as well as being a member of a private Facebook group named after Ernst Röhm.

Kramer has expressed the view that men are typically more fit for politics as they are often more orientated towards wanting to having a say, stating that the average women often lacks the interest in such topics.

During a 2018 speech in the Landtag, Kramer used the word "Neger" to paint a scenario of a Ghanaian making their way to Germany in order to receive social welfare. His use of the word caused outrage as the word had been linked to offensive connotations. Kramer however noted that he used the word intentionally and that he would not let others dictate what words are offensive to use and what aren't.

On 9 November 2024, Kramer caused outrage when he accused Julian Barlen, faction leader of the SPD, of wanting to intern the whole AfD faction in camps if he had the power do to so.

Kramer employs Daniel Fiß, a former activist of the Indentitarian movement, as his personal advisor.

== Personal life ==
Kramer is married and has one child.
