= Britta Ernst =

German politician (born 1961)

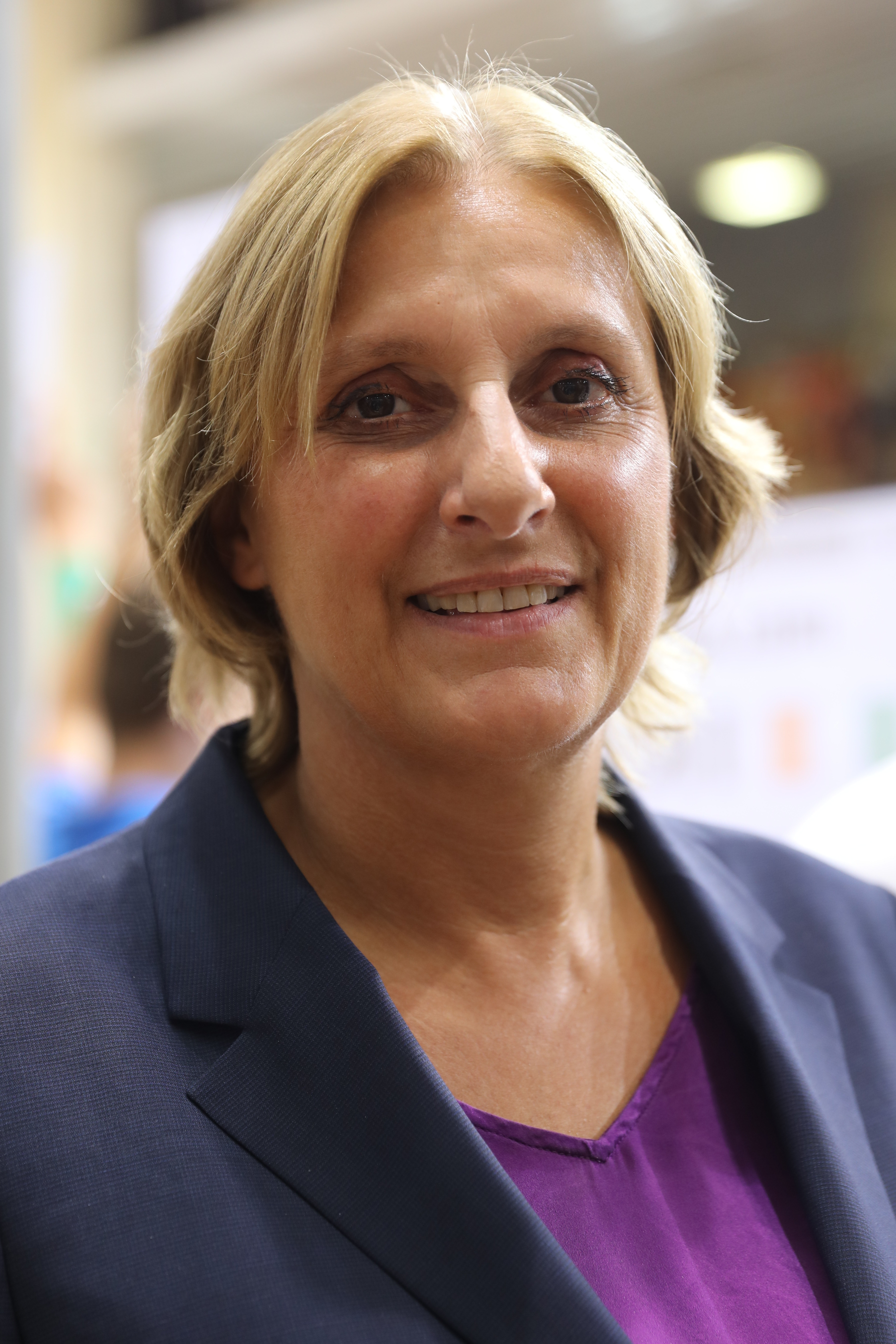
- Ernst in 2019

Minister for Education, Youth and Sport of Brandenburg
- In office 28 September 2017 – 17 April 2023
- Minister-President: Dietmar Woidke
- Preceded by: Günter Baaske
- Succeeded by: Steffen Freiberg

President of the Kultusministerkonferenz
- In office 1 January 2021 – 31 December 2021
- Preceded by: Stefanie Hubig
- Succeeded by: Karin Prien

Minister for School and Professional Education of Schleswig-Holstein
- In office 16 September 2014 – 28 June 2017
- Minister-President: Torsten Albig
- Preceded by: Waltraud Wende
- Succeeded by: Karin Prien
Parliamentary constituencies
Member of the Bundesrat for Brandenburg
In office 17 October 2017 – 19 November 2019
Preceded by	multi-member district
Succeeded by	multi-member district
Member of the Hamburg Parliament
In office 8 October 1997 – 31 August 2011
Preceded by	multi-member district
Succeeded by	Olaf Steinbiß
Constituency	Social Democratic Party List

Personal details
- Born: 23 February 1961 (age 65) Hamburg, West Germany
- Party: Social Democratic Party (1978–present)
- Spouse: Olaf Scholz (m. 1998)
- Education: Hamburger Universität für Wirtschaft und Politik
- Website: Bundesrat website

Britta Ernst (born 23 February 1961) is a German politician of the Social Democratic Party of Germany (SPD) who served as the State Minister for Education and Youth of Brandenburg from 2017 to 2023. She was a member of the Hamburg Parliament from 1997 to 2011, served as School Minister of Schleswig-Holstein from 2014 to 2017, and as president of the Kultusministerkonferenz in 2021. She is married to the former chancellor of Germany, Olaf Scholz.

== Early life ==
Ernst was born in Hamburg. After her Abitur in 1980, she completed an apprenticeship in real estate. Afterwards, Ernst studied general economics, graduating in 1990, and social economics, graduating in 1992.

Ernst is a member of the Friedrich Ebert Foundation and of the ver.di union.

In 1998, Ernst married fellow politician Olaf Scholz, who was elected Chancellor of Germany in 2021. The couple lives in Potsdam.

== Political career ==
Ernst has been an active member of the Social Democratic Party of Germany (SPD) since 1978. From 1991 to 1993 as a member of the Altona district assembly. In 1993 she was senator Traute Müller's personal advisor. From 1994 to 1997 she was senator Thomas Mirow's personal advisor. Ernst was a member of the Hamburg Parliament from 8 October 1997 to 31 August 2011. She represented the SPD in the school committee, science committee and the special committee for neglected children. She was also a member of the commission for school development. From 2001 to 2006 she was deputy parliamentary group leader of the SPD parliamentary group and spokesperson for school policy. Her political priorities are school and education policy as well as gender equality. From 2006 to the beginning of 2011, Ernst was the parliamentary director of her faction. In the 2008 Hamburg state election, she was re-elected to the Hamburg parliament, this time for the Altona constituency. During this term of office, Ernst served as the SPD's spokesperson on constitutional matters. In addition, she continued to serve on the school committee and started to serve on the constitutional and district committee.

During the 2009 Schleswig-Holstein state election, Ernst was a member of Ralf Stegner's shadow cabinet. In the 2011 Hamburg state election, she was re-elected to the Hamburg parliament, but resigned on 31 August of the same year in order to work as deputy parliamentary group manager for the SPD faction in the German Bundestag. In 2014, she was appointed Minister for School and Professional Education of the state of Schleswig-Holstein in minister-president Torsten Albig's cabinet and served as such until 2017, as well as deputy member of the German Bundesrat from 2014 to 2017.

Since September 2017, Ernst has been serving as State Minister for Education, Youth and Sport of Brandenburg in minister-president Dietmar Woidke's cabinet. From 2017 to 2019, she has been a member of the German Bundesrat, and has been a deputy member since 2019. In 2021, she also served as President of the Kultusministerkonferenz, the assembly of ministers of education of the German states.

== Other activities ==
- Stiftung Lesen, Member of the Board of Trustees
