= Daniel Fiß =

German activist and graphic designer

- Born: October 18, 1992 (age 34); Rostock, Mecklenburg-Vorpommern, Germany
- Education: University of Rostock
- Occupations: Political analyst, graphic designer
- Movement: Identitarian movement Neue Rechte
- Website: daniel-fiss.de

Daniel Fiß (born 18 October 1992) is a German New Right activist, political analyst, and graphic designer who served as the deputy leader of the Identitarian movement in Germany between 2016 and the end of 2019.

== Early life ==
Fiß was born on 18 October 1992 in Rostock. He attended the University of Rostock where he studied philosophy and political science.

== Career ==
Around 2011, Fiß was active within the neo-Nazi scene, being a member of the Young National Democrats, the youth wing of the National Democratic Party of Germany (now The Homeland), and the Kameradschaft National Socialists of Rostock (German: Nationale Sozialisten Rostock). Fiß has since distanced himself from this past.

Between 2016 and 2019, Fiß served as the federal deputy leader of the Identitarian movement in Germany, previously serving as the leader of the state branch in his home state of Mecklenburg-Vorpommern. During his tenure as deputy leader, the Identitarian movement in Germany moved its seat from Paderborn to Rostock.

During early-to-mid 2019, Fiß worked for Siegbert Droese in the Bundestag on a 2-month contract, primarily in graphic design.

Since 2020, Fiß has run the blog Feldzug. Fiß has also written for the blog of Sezession, operated by Götz Kubitschek, and the Freilich Magazin. The primary focus of his work is analyzing political strategies and behavioral patterns among the electorate, calling himself a political analyst. Around 2024, Fiß was also the editor-in-chief of an Austrian magazine called Heimatkurier. Fiß also operates the media agency Okzident Media, founded in 2018, which does graphic- and webdesign as well as offering social media services, campaign planning, and marketing consulting.

Since 1 December 2024, Fiß has worked for Nikolaus Kramer in the Landtag of Mecklenburg-Vorpommern. Kramer has stated that he trusts Fiß and values his analyses.

Since 10 January 2026, Fiß has been a committee member of Generation Germany, the youth wing of the Alternative for Germany, in Mecklenburg-Vorpommern.

== Views ==
In 2016, Fiß described himself as a right-wing conservative (German: rechtskonservativ) and again distanced himself from his "old right" past. In 2017, he called himself an "identitarian and patriotic activist".

The Office for the Protection of the Constitution of Mecklenburg-Vorpommern has called Fiß a völkisch nationalist.

== Personal life ==
Fiß continues to live in Rostock.

== Publications ==
- Wer wählt rechts - und warum?, Institut für Staatspolitik, 2023, ISBN 978-3-939869-42-9
