= Jeannine Rösler =

German politician (born 1970)

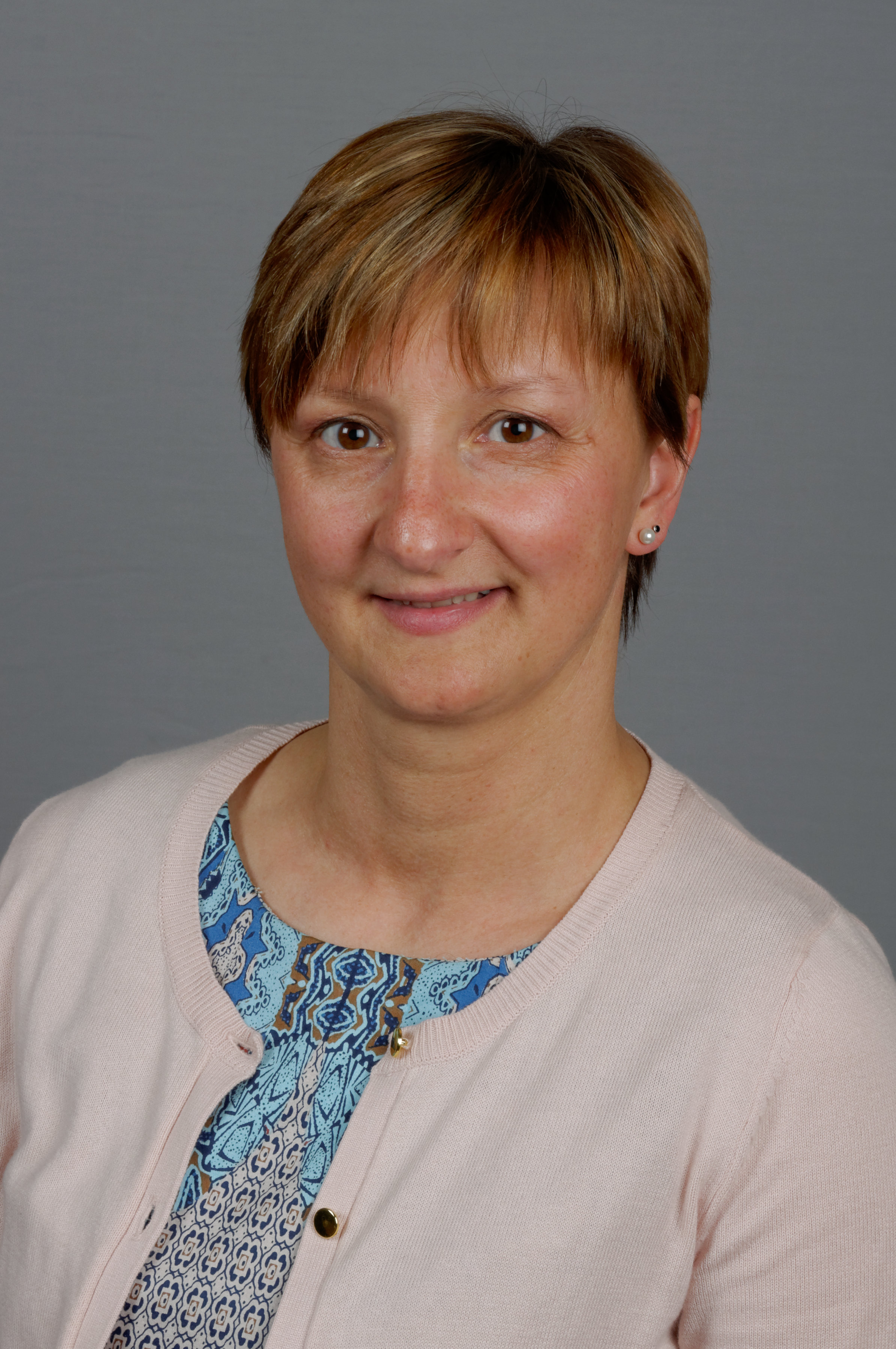
- Rösler in 2017

Member of the Landtag of Mecklenburg-Vorpommern
- Incumbent
- Assumed office 4 October 2011

Personal details
- Born: 10 July 1970 (age 55) Teterow
- Party: Die Linke

Jeannine Rösler (born 10 July 1970 in Teterow) is a German politician serving as a member of the Landtag of Mecklenburg-Vorpommern since 2011. She has served as group leader of Die Linke since 2021.
