= René Domke =

German politician (born 1972)

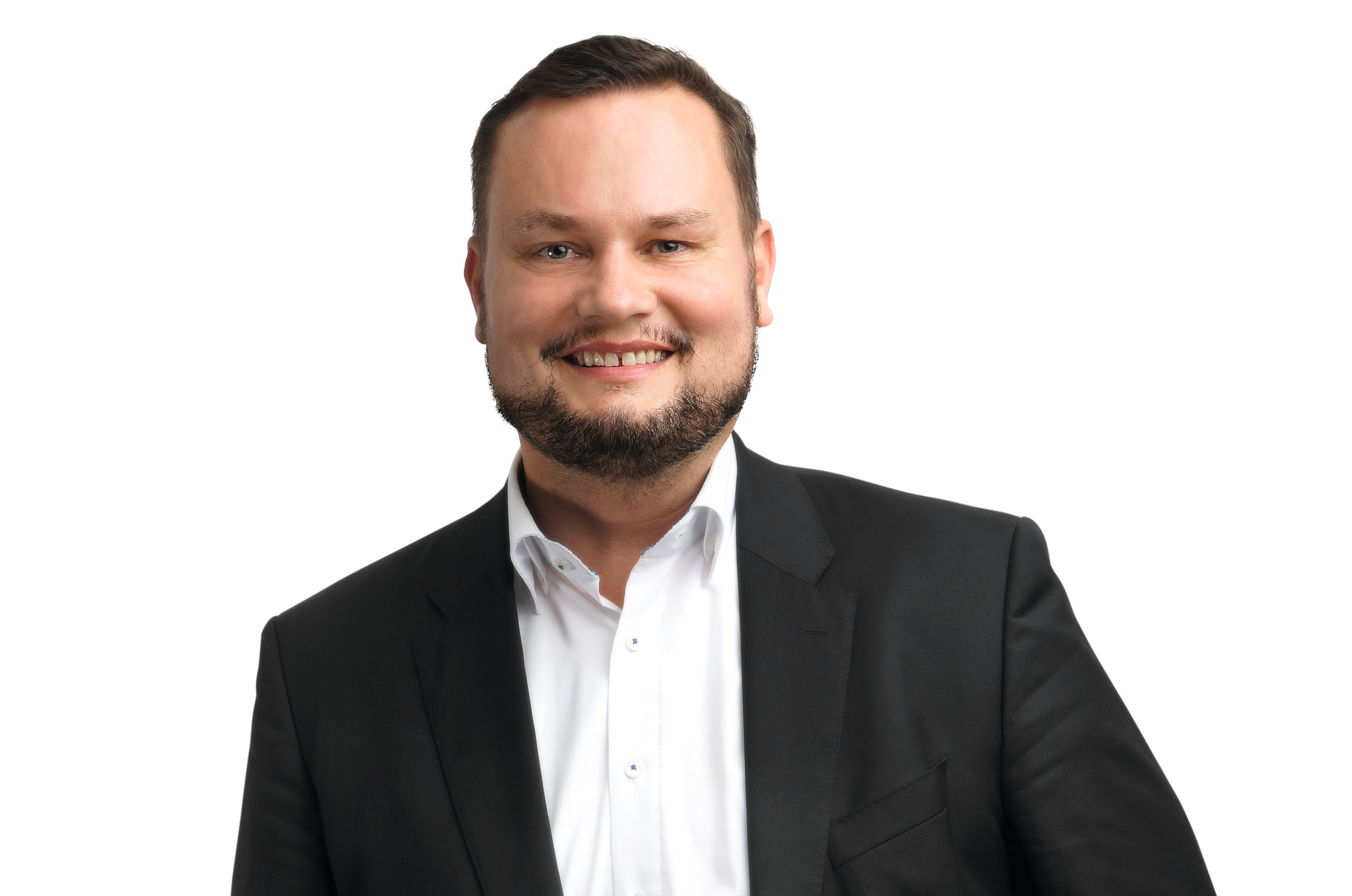
- Domke in 2016

Member of the Landtag of Mecklenburg-Vorpommern
- Incumbent
- Assumed office 26 October 2021

Personal details
- Born: 6 February 1972 (age 54) Wismar
- Party: Free Democratic Party

René Domke (born 6 February 1972 in Wismar) is a German politician serving as a member of the Landtag of Mecklenburg-Vorpommern since 2021. He has served as chairman of the Free Democratic Party in Mecklenburg-Vorpommern since 2013.
