= Jacqueline Bernhardt =

German politician (born 1977)

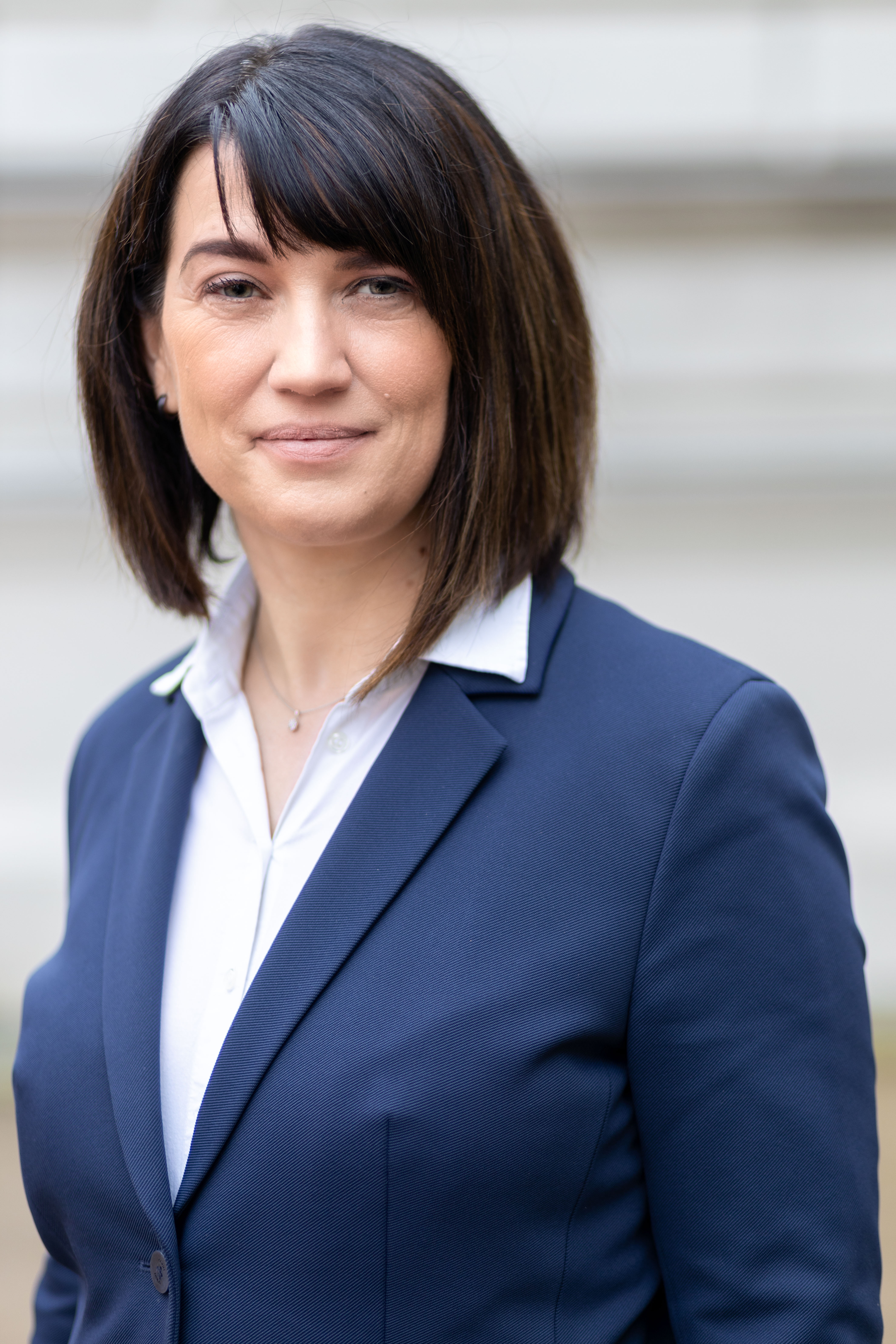
- Bernhardt in 2021

Minister of Justice, Equality and Consumer Protection of Mecklenburg-Vorpommern
- Incumbent
- Assumed office 15 November 2021
- Minister-President: Manuela Schwesig
- Preceded by: Katy Hoffmeister

Personal details
- Born: 13 February 1977 (age 49) Leipzig
- Party: Die Linke (since 2007)
- Other political affiliations: Party of Democratic Socialism (2005–2007)

Jacqueline Bernhardt (born 13 February 1977 in Leipzig) is a German politician serving as minister of justice, equality and consumer protection of Mecklenburg-Vorpommern since 2021. From 2011 to 2021, she was a member of the Landtag of Mecklenburg-Vorpommern.
