= Mathias Brodkorb =

German politician and author (born 1977)

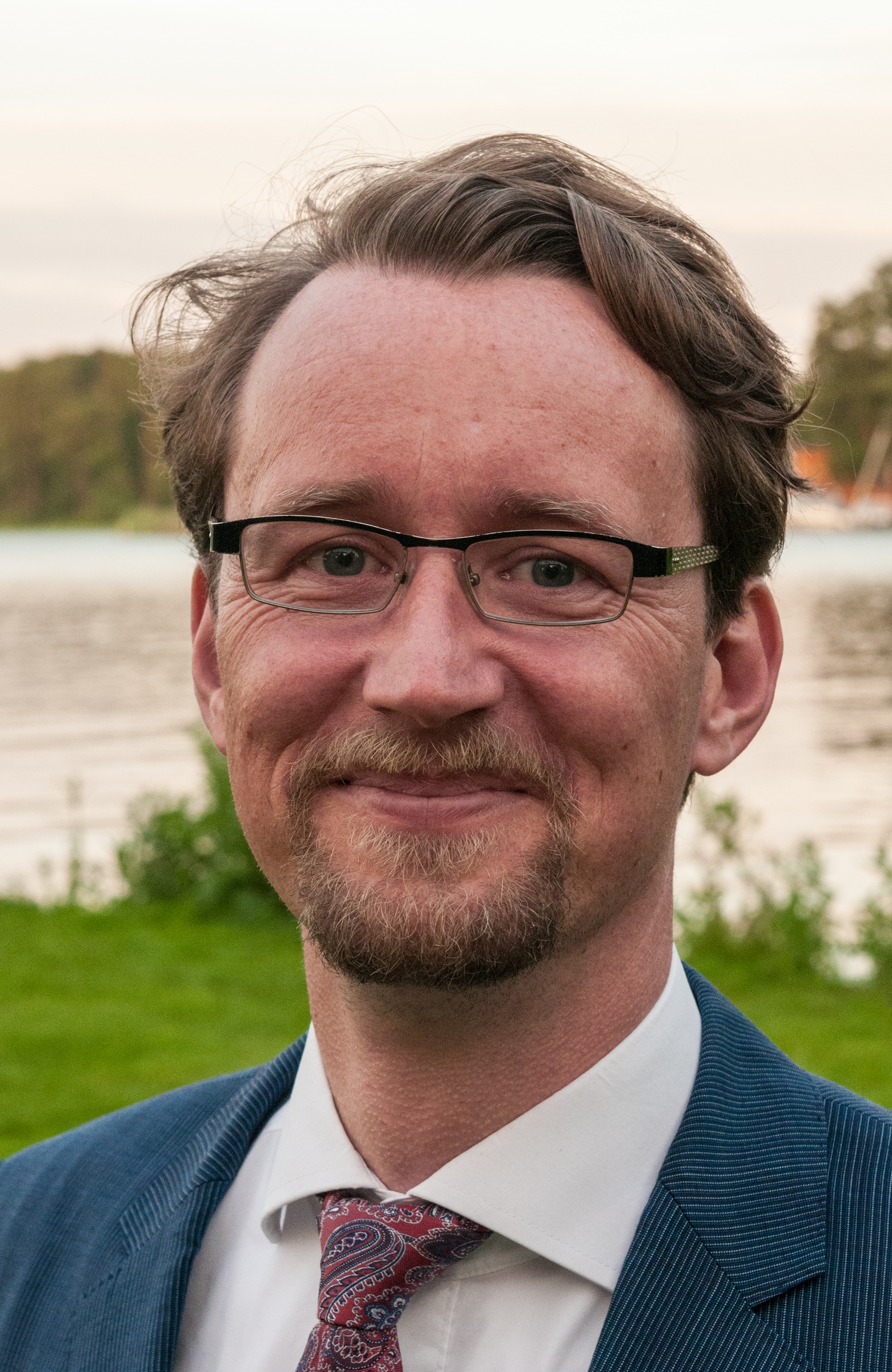
Brodkorb

Mathias Brodkorb (born 20 March 1977) is a German politician (SPD) and journalist. He was involved in researching right-wing extremist ideologies as the founder of the Endstation Rechts project. He was member of the Landtag of Mecklenburg-Vorpommern from 2002 to 2019, and served as the Minister of Finance, and previously for Education, Science and Culture. He was Chairman of the SPD parliamentary group.

In October 2019, Brodkorb resigned from the state parliament to take over the position of head of the supervisory board of the Rostock University Medicine and the Greifswald University Medicine as a special representative in the Ministry of Education under Bettina Martin till 2022.

== Life ==
Brodkorb's family left the GDR in 1987 and settled in his father's homeland in Korneuburg, Austria.

He returned to his hometown of Rostock in 1992. There he passed his Abitur in 1996 and, after completing his community service, studied philosophy and ancient Greek at the University of Rostock from 1997 onwards. Brodkorb completed his studies in 2005 with a master's degree in philosophy.

From 1994 to 1997 Brodkorb was a member of the Party of Democratic Socialism (PDS) and was involved in the sub-group "Communist Platform". His involvement with Marxism led him to philosophy. Over the course of his studies, Brodkorb increasingly distanced himself from communism. In 1997 he switched to the SPD, where he became state chairman of the youth organization Jusos in 1998 and was a member of the SPD state executive board. He became increasingly known for his activities in university politics and the fight against right-wing extremism. He initiated the project Endstation Rechts, Storch Heinar, Adebor Verlag and the magazine Horizonte (2002–2015).

In 2002 he was the first time elected to the state parliament. Brodkorb became Minister for Education, Science and Culture of the State of Mecklenburg-Western Pomerania in 2011 and later Chairman of the SPD parliamentary group of Landtag. In 2019 he became Minister of Finance of the State of Mecklenburg-Western Pomerania.

In October 2019, Brodkorb resigned from the state parliament to become head of the supervisory board of Rostock University Medicine and the Greifswald University Medicine as a special representative in the Ministry of Education under Bettina Martin till 2022.

== Politics ==
In a guest article in the Neue Zürcher Zeitung in 2019, Brodkorb called for East German society to be more open to immigration in view of the shortage of skilled workers in the new federal states.

In the magazine Cicero, for which he regularly writes commentaries, he called for the reintroduction of compulsory military service (Wehrpflicht")in Germany after the Russian invasion of Ukraine on February 24, 2022.

In his book Attitude Police in the Constitutional State? in 2024 he discussed fundamental reform needs and the demand for the abolition of the Office for the Protection of the Constitution. Thomas Haldenwang president of BfV wrote in 2024 regarding the Freedom of speech, as guaranteed in article 5 of the Basic Law for the Federal Republic of Germany, that certain opinions could result in investigation by the BfV, even if those opinions themself were protected by Freedom of speech. This drew criticism from Brodkorb, questioning Haldenwangs understanding of democracy.
