= Stefanie Drese =

German politician (born 1976)

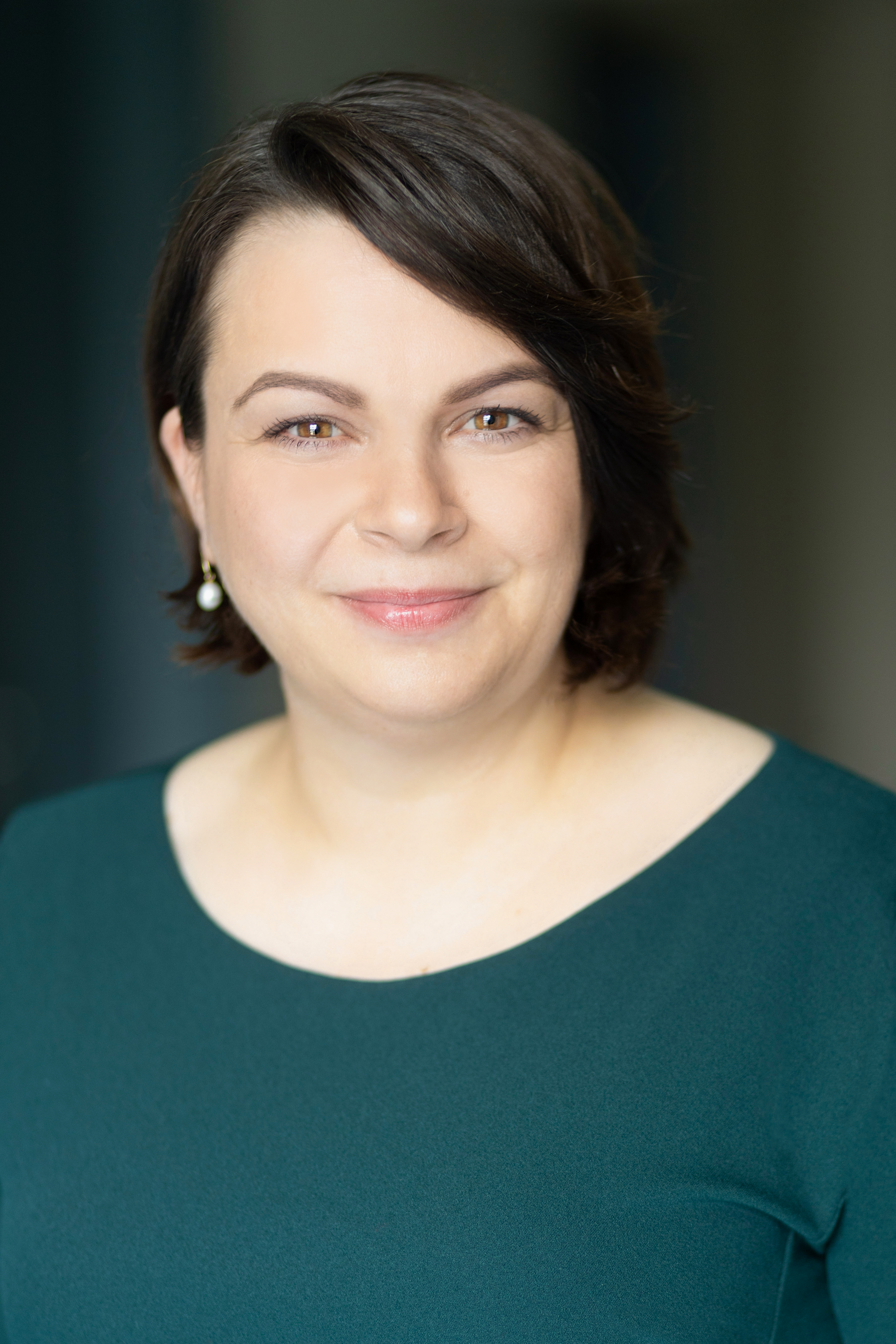
- Drese in 2022

Minister of Social Affairs, Health and Sport of Mecklenburg-Vorpommern
- Incumbent
- Assumed office 15 November 2021
- Minister-President: Manuela Schwesig

Personal details
- Born: 9 December 1976 (age 49) Rostock
- Party: Social Democratic Party (since 2003)

Stefanie Drese (born 9 December 1976 in Rostock) is a German politician serving as minister of social affairs, health and sport of Mecklenburg-Vorpommern since 2021. From 2016 to 2021, she served as minister of social affairs, integration and equality. She has been a member of the Landtag of Mecklenburg-Vorpommern since 2011.
