= AfD Mecklenburg-Vorpommern =

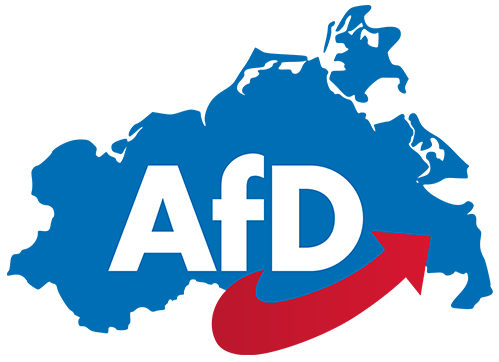
- Chairperson: Leif-Erik Holm & Enrico Schult
- Ideology: Right-wing populism
- Political position: Far-right
- National affiliation: Alternative for Germany
- Colors: Light blue
- Landtag of Mecklenburg-Vorpommern: 32 / 79

Website
- afd-mv.de

The AfD Mecklenburg-Vorpommern is the state branch of the right-wing populist and far right Alternative for Germany party in Mecklenburg-Western Pomerania.

As of 2025, the AfD Mecklenburg-Vorpommern is the only eastern German state branch that has not been designated as a confirmed right-wing extremist.

== History ==
The regional association was founded on April 21, 2013, in Güstrow. Andreas Küssner, Leif-Erik Holm and Steffen Wandschneider acted as speakers for the state board. After almost a year, a new state board was elected at the beginning of February 2014. The previous speakers were replaced by Holger Arppe and Matthias Manthei. Arppe no longer stood for board elections at the end of November 2014. At the state party conference on November 29, 2014, Leif-Erik Holm and Matthias Manthei were elected to head the state executive board.

At the state party conference in Güstrow in 2015, in addition to Holm and Manthei, Arppe and Schwerin city councilor Petra Federau also ran for the board. Both lost in a fight vote. The former state chairman Arppe became an assessor on the state board.

In February 2016, the party decided on its state list for the 2016 state elections. Petra Federau received third place on the list. After Federau did not comply with the requests of the AfD state and district association, she worked temporarily for an escort service with clients in the Arab world To explain, she was removed from the list at an extraordinary party conference in June 2016. As a direct candidate in the Schwerin II state parliamentary constituency, she received 19.8% of the initial votes. In November 2016, the members elected a new state executive at a party conference in Gägelow. Leif-Erik Holm was confirmed as state spokesman. Bernhard Wildt prevailed over Enrico Komning in the election as equal state speaker.

In the 7th electoral term, on January 26, 2017, at the request of the AfD, an investigative committee was set up "to examine the funding structure, the funding process and the funding practice for grants from state funds as well as the use of these state funds by those in the association, LIGA, the leading association of independent welfare in Mecklenburg-Western Pomerania e. V. should clarify the central associations in the period from 2010 to 2016”. The background was suspicions and reports that corruption and mismanagement had occurred at the Mecklenburg-Western Pomerania Workers' Welfare Association.

The previous co-speaker Matthias Manthei no longer stood for election and left the AfD parliamentary group on September 25, 2017, together with Bernhard Wildt, Ralf Borschke and Christel Weißig and founded the “Citizens for Mecklenburg-Western Pomerania” (BMV) faction, later the Citizens for Mecklenburg-Western Pomerania party. In October 2019, Ralf Borschke rejoined the AfD parliamentary group. On July 5, 2019, Holm's co-leader Dennis Augustin was expelled from the party. In October 2019, Ralf Borschke rejoined the AfD parliamentary group.

In August 2025, the police special forces, raided the castle of the neo-Nazi and AfD politician Philip Steinbeck in the district of Ludwigslust-Parchim. They seized a wide variety of firearms, bladed weapons, and stabbing weapons, as well as a large quantity of explosives. Steinbeck had studied law in Kiel and worked for the Nazi Party „German League for People and Homeland“ in the Kiel state parliament in the early 1990s. He was associated with the Hamburg NPD chairman Jürgen Rieger and later joined AfD. Steinbeck later posted a video on social media, shwoing him herassig and beating two youngsters.

== Politics ==
The state association ran for the state election for the first time in 2016 and received 20.8% of the vote. In its election program adopted at the beginning of 2016, the AfD Mecklenburg-Western Pomerania advocated an extension of parental allowance and the reintroduction of a family loan. According to the party, free daycare places should be offered, more teachers should be hired, special schools should be maintained and the introduction of uniform school clothing should be made possible. To reduce crime, the party wants to improve police personnel and equipment and reintroduce border controls. According to the party program, the number of safe countries of origin should be expanded and rejected asylum seekers should be deported more quickly. The AfD also rejects Daylight saving time and the contribution service of ARD, ZDF and Deutschlandradio and supports free shop opening times.

== Election results ==
State Parliament (Landtag)

Year	No. of overall votes	% of overall vote & ranking	No. of overall seats won	+/–
2016	167,852	20.8 (#2)	18 / 71	
2021	152,775	16.7 (#2)	14 / 79	▼4
2026	387,929	38.2 (#1)	32 / 79	▲18

== Members of the parliamentary group ==
The following politicians were elected to the Landtag of Mecklenburg-Vorpommern during the 2021 Mecklenburg-Vorpommern state election:

List	Name	Note/Function
1	Nikolaus Kramer	Faction leader
2	Horst Förster	
3	Thomas de Jesus Fernandes	
4	Petra Federau	
5	Thore Stein	
6	Enrico Schult	Elected via Mecklenburgische Seenplatte I – Vorpommern-Greifswald I constituency
7	Jens Schulze-Wiehenbrauk	
8	Martin Schmidt	
11	Michael Meister	
12	Jan-Phillip Tadsen	
13	Jens-Holger Schneider	
14	Stephan Reuken	

Eva Maria Schneider-Gärtner, elected though the party list nr. 9, left the faction on 25 April 2023.

== See also ==
- AfD Saxony
- AfD Thuringia
- AfD Saxony-Anhalt
- AfD Brandenburg
- AfD Berlin
- New states of Germany
