= Christian Bartelt =

German politician (born 1976)

Member of the Bundestag
- In office 2023–2025

Personal details
- Born: 16 September 1976 (age 49) Neubrandenburg
- Party: FDP

Christian Bartelt (born 1976 in Neubrandenburg) is a German dentist and politician of the Free Democratic Party (FDP) who was a member of the German Bundestag from 2023 to March 2025.

== Political career ==
Bartelt has been a member of the FDP since 2002.

Bartelt stood as a candidate in the 2005 federal elections and in the 2009 federal elections in the federal constituency of Greifswald – Demmin – Ostvorpommern. In the 2006 Mecklenburg-Vorpommern state election, 2011, 2016 and 2021 in the state constituency of Vorpommern-Greifswald II and in the federal elections in 2013, 2017 and 2021 in the federal constituency of Mecklenburgische Seenplatte I – Vorpommern-Greifswald II.

=== Member of the German Parliament, 2023–2025 ===
In September 2023, Bartelt replaced Hagen Reinhold as a Member of the German Bundestag for Mecklenburg-Vorpommern. In parliament, he has since been serving on the Health Committee, the Committee on Economic Affairs, the Sports Committee and the Committee on Petitions.

In addition to his committee assignments, Bartelt has been an alternate member of the German delegation to the Baltic Sea Parliamentary Conference since 2023.
