= Erik von Malottki =

German politician (born 1986)

- von Malottki in 2021

Member of the Bundestag; for Mecklenburgische Seenplatte I – Vorpommern-Greifswald II
- In office 26 October 2021 – 25 March 2025
- Preceded by: Philipp Amthor
- Succeeded by: Enrico Komning

Personal details
- Born: 1 April 1986 (age 40) Grevesmühlen, East Germany
- Party: Social Democratic
- Children: 1
- Education: University of Greifswald (MA)

Erik von Malottki (born 1 April 1986) is a German politician of the Social Democratic Party (SPD). He became a member of the Bundestag in the 2021 German federal election and he represents the constituency of Mecklenburgische Seenplatte I – Vorpommern-Greifswald II.
