= Leif-Erik Holm =

German politician

Leif-Erik Holm MdB
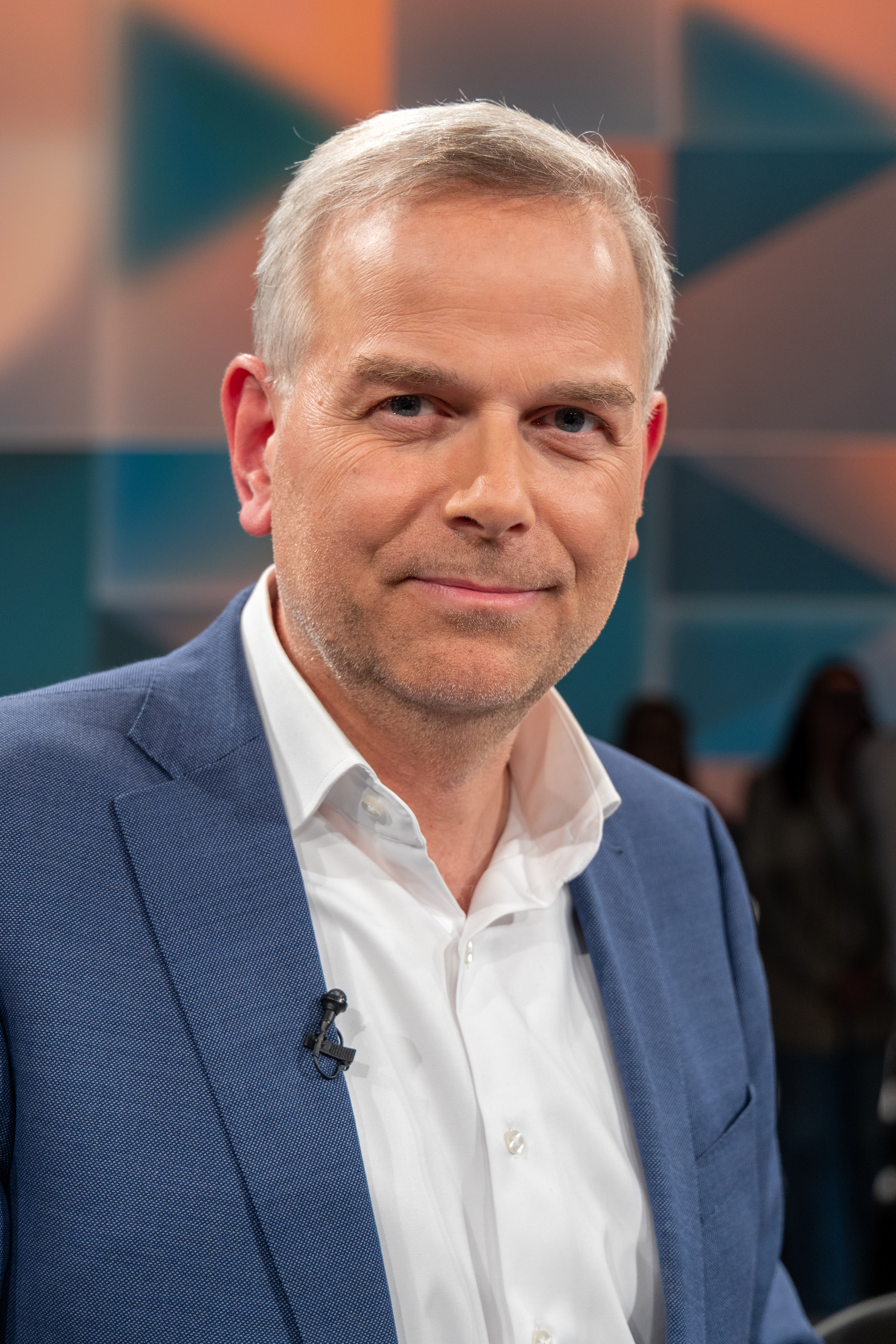
- Holm in 2024

Member of the Bundestag; from Mecklenburg-Vorpommern
- Incumbent
- Assumed office 24 October 2017
- Constituency: State list (2017–2025); Schwerin – Ludwigslust-Parchim I – Nordwestmecklenburg I (2025–present)

Member of the; Landtag of Mecklenburg-Vorpommern
- In office 4 October 2016 – 30 November 2017
- Preceded by: Multi-member district
- Succeeded by: Horst Förster
- Constituency: State list

Personal details
- Born: 1 August 1970 (age 56) Schwerin, East Germany
- Party: Alternative for Germany
- Children: 4
- Education: Hochschule Wismar; Humboldt University of Berlin

Leif-Erik Holm (born 1 August 1970) is a German politician of the Alternative for Germany and member of the Bundestag since 2017, the German federal parliament. He is also chairman of the AfD Mecklenburg-Vorpommern.

Holm worked as a radio presenter for the private Antenne MV broadcaster, studied economics in Berlin, and became a politician in 2013.

Holm is since 2013, with a short interruption in 2015, state chairman of his party in Mecklenburg-Vorpommern. He was theleading AfD candidate in the state in the 2013 German federal elections and was also frontrunner for his party in the 2016 Mecklenburg-Vorpommern state elections and again in the 2021 German federal elections. During the campaigns Holm warned of the spread of Islam.

At the 2026 Mecklenburg-Vorpommern state election he had to share the frontrunner position with his party rival Enrico Schult as AfD-team.

Holm temporarily worked for fellow AfD politician Beatrix von Storch.
