= Daniel Peters =

German politician (born 1981)

- Peters in 2021

Member of the Landtag of Mecklenburg-Vorpommern
- In office 3 March 2020 – 21 September 2026
- Preceded by: Vincent Kokert

Personal details
- Born: 11 June 1981 (age 45) Rostock, East Germany (now Germany)
- Party: Christian Democratic Union (since 2002)
- Children: 1
- Education: University of Rostock

Daniel Peters (born 11 June 1981) is a German politician serving as a member of the Landtag of Mecklenburg-Vorpommern since 2020. He has served as group leader of the Christian Democratic Union and as state president of the party since 2024.

== Early life and education ==
Born in Rostock, Peters attended the Friderico-Francisceum in Bad Dobrean until 2002. After graduating, he joined the CDU and studied demography, political science, and European history at the University of Rostock, earning a master’s degree in 2009. From 2009 to 2020, he worked as a research assistant to Bundestag member Eckhardt Rehberg.

== Political career ==
Peters entered the Rostock City Council in 2014 and was re-elected in 2019. He chairs the councils' CDU/UFR parliamentary group. He first ran for the Landtag of Mecklenburg-Vorpommern in the 2016 election but was not elected. In March 2020, he entered parliament as Vincent Kokert’s successor and was re-elected in the 2021 election.

In March 2022, Peters became Secretary General of the CDU Mecklenburg-Vorpommern, receiving 95.1% of the vote. In April 2024, he was elected state party chairman and, shortly afterwards, chairman of the CDU parliamentary group in the state parliament.

== Personal life ==
Peters is married and has one child. He is a member and supporter of FC Hansa Rostock.
