= Philipp Amthor =

German politician (born 1992)

Philipp Amthor MdB
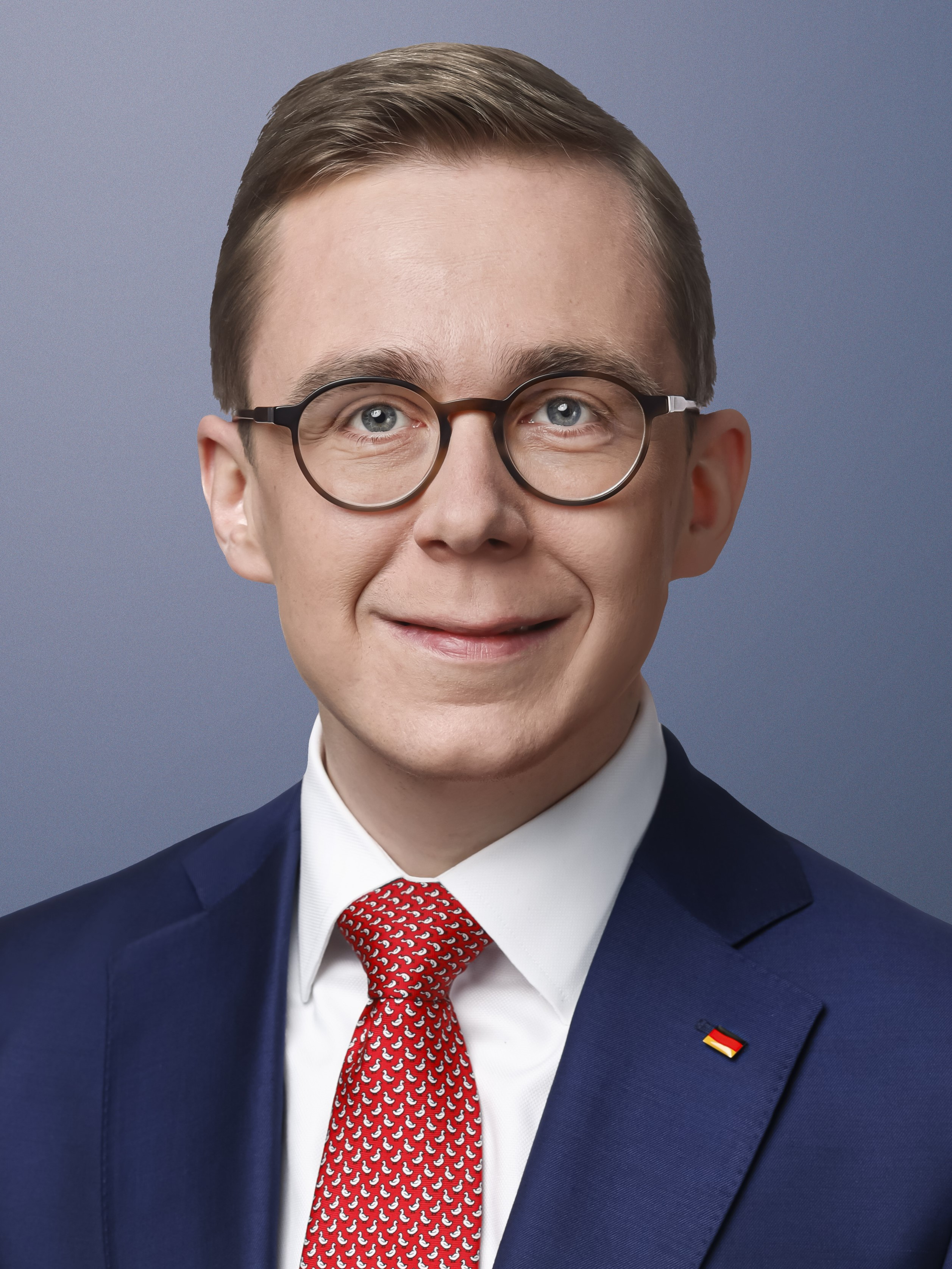
- Official portrait, 2021

Minister of State for Federal-State Relations
- Incumbent
- Assumed office 29 July 2026
- Chancellor: Friedrich Merz
- Preceded by: Michael Meister

Parliamentary State Secretary at the Ministry for Digital Transformation and Government Modernisation
- In office 6 May 2025 – 29 July 2026
- Minister: Karsten Wildberger
- Preceded by: Position established
- Succeeded by: Gitta Connemann

Acting Leader of the Christian Democratic Union in Mecklenburg-Vorpommern
- Incumbent
- Assumed office 21 September 2026
- Deputy: Timo Schomann; Antonia Riecken
- Preceded by: Daniel Peters

Member of the Bundestag; from Mecklenburg-Vorpommern
- Incumbent
- Assumed office 24 October 2017
- Preceded by: Matthias Lietz
- Constituency: Mecklenburgische Seenplatte I – Vorpommern-Greifswald II (2017–2021); State list (2021–present)

Personal details
- Born: 10 November 1992 (age 34) Ueckermünde, Germany
- Party: Christian Democratic Union (since 2008)
- Education: University of Greifswald

Philipp Amthor (born 10 November 1992) is a German politician of the Christian Democratic Union (CDU) who has been a member of the Bundestag since the 2017 German federal election.

In addition to his work in parliament, Amthor has been serving as a Parliamentary State Secretary at the Federal Ministry for Digital and State Modernisation (2025–2026) and as Minister of State for Federal-State Relations (2026–present) in the government of Chancellor Friedrich Merz since 2025. From 2018 to 2020, he worked as a lobbyist for the now inactive IT company Augustus Intelligence.

== Education and early career ==
Amthor was born in 1992 in Ueckermünde and grew up in Torgelow. He studied law at the University of Greifswald, on a scholarship of the Konrad Adenauer Foundation (KAS). From 2017 to 2020, he worked as a research associate at the Berlin office of White & Case.

Amthor announced 2019 he is working on a law dissertation.

In December 2019, he became a member of the Roman Catholic Church by being baptized.

== Political career ==
=== 19th Bundestag ===
Amthor joined the CDU in 2008. In the 2017 elections he became member of the Bundestag as the directly elected MP for the Mecklenburgische Seenplatte I – Vorpommern-Greifswald II constituency. In parliament, he has since been serving on the Committee on Internal Affairs (since 2018) and the Committee on European Affairs (2018–2021). Since the 2021 elections, Amthor has been serving as his parliamentary group's spokesperson for state modernization.

Since 2018, Amthor has been the treasurer of the Young Union (JU), making him part of the organization's leadership around chairman Tilman Kuban.

Following the resignation of Vincent Kokert as chairman of the CDU in Mecklenburg-Vorpommern, Amthor announced his candidacy for the role. Amid growing criticism of his lobbying activities on behalf of a private company, he declared in June 2020 that he would not run for the party's leadership in the state anymore.

From 2018 to 2022, he served as treasurer on the federal executive committee of the Young Union. Likewise, since 2018, he has served as treasurer on the executive committee of the parliamentary group of small and medium-sized businesses of the CDU/CSU parliamentary group, as well as being a member of the federal working group of Christian Democratic lawyers. Since 2019, he has been chairman of the Young Group and deputy chairman of the Group of Expellees (Gruppe der Vertriebenen). In addition, he ran in electoral district 9, Ueckermünde, on list position one for the district council Vorpommern-Greifswald and has been its honorary member since 2019.

Amthor is also a member of the state executive committee of the Mittelstands-Union Mecklenburg-Vorpommern and a member of the federal executive committee of the East and Central German Association of the CDU. Until June 2020, Amthor was a member of the 1st investigative committee of the 19th legislative period of the German Bundestag.

Since 2021, Amthor has been a member of the Modern State Commission of the CDU Basic Program Commission.

=== 20th Bundestag ===
In March 2021, Amthor was elected to first place on the list of the CDU Mecklenburg-Vorpommern for the 2021 federal election. In July 2021, a photo of Amthor taken during the horse festival Szczecin Lagoon caused a stir. In it, Amthor was seen with two men, one of whom was wearing a T-shirt with the inscription "Solidarity with Ursula Haverbeck". Via Instagram, Amthor later apologized for the photo posted by one of the men, noting that he would not have taken the photo if he had noticed the inscription on the T-shirt. As in the 2017 election, he competed in the Mecklenburgische Seenplatte I - Vorpommern-Greifswald II Bundestag constituency, achieving 20.7% of the first-past-the-post vote in his constituency and thus falling short of the direct mandate; he nevertheless entered the 20th German Bundestag via the Mecklenburg-Vorpommern CDU state list.

Within the CDU/CSU parliamentary group, Amthor has since held the office of spokesman for state organization and state modernization and is chairman of the Mecklenburg-Vorpommern state group and a member of the parliamentary group's executive committee. He is a full member of the Committee on the Interior and Homeland and a deputy member of the Joint Committee, Committee on Election Scrutiny, Immunity and Rules of Procedure and the Legal Affairs Committee.

On 14 May 2022, Amthor was elected to succeed Franz-Robert Liskow as chairman of the CDU district association of Vorpommern-Greifswald.

== Augustus Intelligence lobbying scandal ==
In 2018 and 2019, the physician Wolfgang Haupt recruited more than 30 private investors from Europe and the USA with the help of political contacts, especially in conservative circles, who invested more than USD 35 million in his start-up. The basis was a company valuation of more than 250 million dollars, although the company was not able to show one own marketable product.

In 2020, German news magazine Der Spiegel published a story detailed Amthor's lobbying efforts with chancellor Angela Merkel for the American-German company. In April 2021, the company, which among other things wanted to develop AI software for face and speech recognition, applied for bankruptcy protection proceedings in the USA (Chapter 11). A few months later Haupt died in a helicopter crash in Baden-Württemberg, Germany.

== Political positions ==
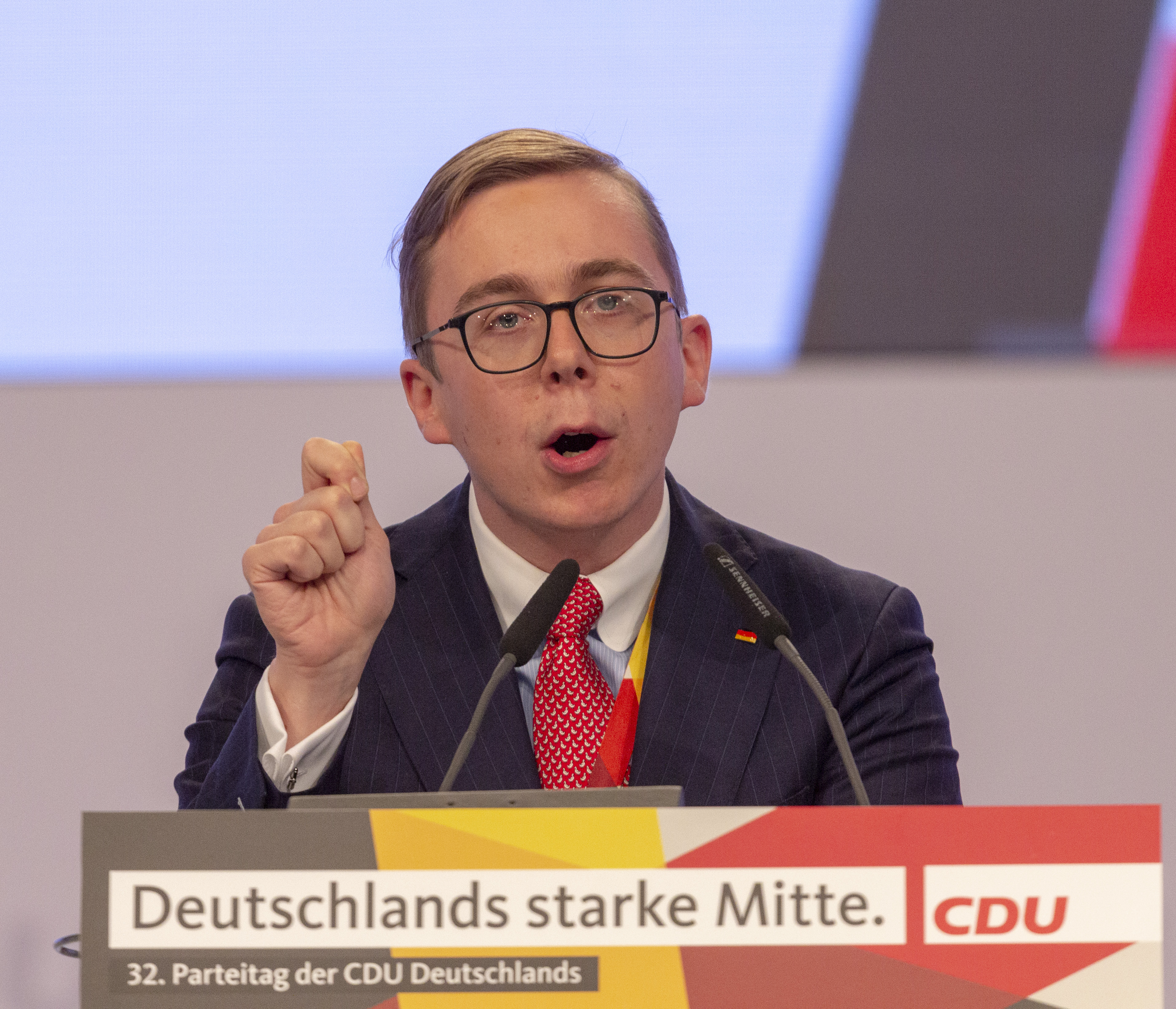
Amthor in 2019

Within the CDU, Amthor considers himself to be part of the conservative wing. In the Bundestag, he explained, quoting Harald Martenstein, that for him ″right″ does not necessarily mean ″far-right″ and that the political right has its legitimate place in a democracy. He took a stand against gender mainstreaming, abortion and the introduction of same-sex marriage in Germany. Amthor considers himself a feminist and believes every man should do so as well. Amthor has clearly positioned himself against the Alternative for Germany (AfD) on various occasions.

Ahead of the Christian Democrats' leadership election in 2018, Amthor publicly endorsed Jens Spahn to succeed Merkel as the party's chair. He later endorsed Friedrich Merz as Annegret Kramp-Karrenbauer's successor at the party's 2021 leadership election.

== Public personality ==
Amthor's eccentric personality, dated speech and conservative political positions, in contrast to his youthful age, have led to him being dubbed "the oldest 26-year-old in Germany", and has made him the subject of significant public mockery and online memes. He is particularly known for his frequent use of the word Schabernack, a word that approximately translates to "jokery" or "tomfoolery".

== Other activities ==
- Augustus Intelligence, Member of the Board of Directors (2019–2020)
- Atlantik-Brücke, Member
