= Torsten Renz =

German politician (born 1964)

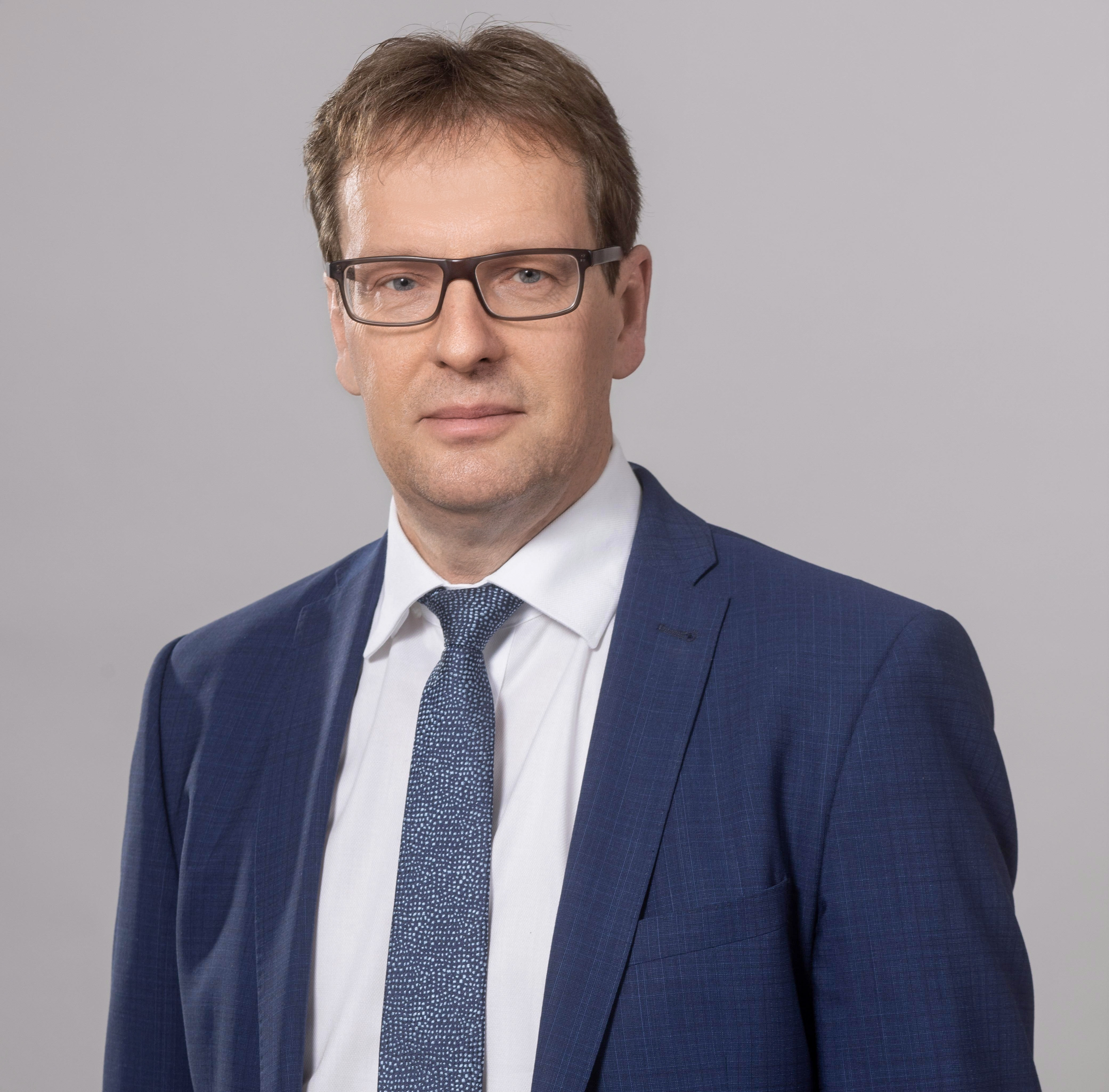
- Renz in 2021

Minister of the Interior of Mecklenburg-Vorpommern
- In office 27 November 2020 – 15 November 2021
- Minister-President: Manuela Schwesig
- Preceded by: Lorenz Caffier
- Succeeded by: Christian Pegel

Personal details
- Born: 13 August 1964 (age 61) Güstrow
- Party: Christian Democratic Union

Torsten Renz (born 13 August 1964 in Güstrow) is a German politician. He has been a member of the Landtag of Mecklenburg-Vorpommern since 2009, having previously served from 2002 to 2006. From 2020 to 2021, he served as minister of the interior of Mecklenburg-Vorpommern.
