= Mecklenburgische Seenplatte I – Vorpommern-Greifswald II =

Federal electoral district of Germany

Coordinates: 53°42′23″N 13°43′34″E

16 Mecklenburgische Seenplatte I – Vorpommern-Greifswald II
- Electoral district for the Bundestag
- Mecklenburgische Seenplatte I – Vorpommern-Greifswald II in 2025
- State: Mecklenburg-Vorpommern
- Population: 267,400 (2019)
- Electorate: 221,421 (2021)
- Major settlements: Neubrandenburg; Anklam
- Area: 4,968.3 km^{2}

Current electoral district
- Created: 2013
- Party: AfD
- Member: Enrico Komning
- Elected: 2025

Mecklenburgische Seenplatte I – Vorpommern-Greifswald II is an electoral constituency (German: Wahlkreis) represented in the Bundestag. It elects one member via first-past-the-post voting. Under the current constituency numbering system, it is designated as constituency 16. It is located in southeast Mecklenburg-Vorpommern, comprising most of the Vorpommern-Greifswald district and southeast parts of the Mecklenburgische Seenplatte district.

Mecklenburgische Seenplatte I – Vorpommern-Greifswald II was created for the 2013 federal election. From 2021 to 2025, it was represented by Erik von Malottki of the Social Democratic Party (SPD). Since 2025 it has been represented by Enrico Komning of the AfD.

== Geography ==
Mecklenburgische Seenplatte I – Vorpommern-Greifswald II is located in southeast Mecklenburg-Vorpommern. As of the 2021 federal election, it comprises all of the Vorpommern-Greifswald district with the exception of municipality of Greifswald and the Amt of Landhagen, as well as the municipalities of Feldberger Seenlandschaft and Neubrandenburg and the Ämter of Friedland, Neverin, Stargarder Land, and Woldegk from the Mecklenburgische Seenplatte district.

== History ==
Mecklenburgische Seenplatte I – Vorpommern-Greifswald II was created in 2013 and contained parts of the abolished constituencies of Greifswald – Demmin – Ostvorpommern and Neubrandenburg – Mecklenburg-Strelitz – Uecker-Randow. Its borders have not changed since its creation.

== Members ==
The constituency was won by the Christian Democratic Union (CDU) in 2013, and represented by Matthias Lietz. He was succeeded by party fellow Philipp Amthor in 2017. Erik von Malottki won the constituency for the Social Democratic Party (SPD) in 2021.

Election	Member	Party	%
2013	Matthias Lietz	CDU	45.9
2017	Philipp Amthor	CDU	31.2
2021	Erik von Malottki	SPD	24.8
2025	Enrico Komning	AfD	45.2

== Election results ==
=== 2025 election ===
Federal election (2025): Mecklenburgische Seenplatte I – Vorpommern-Greifswald II
Notes:	Blue background denotes the winner of the electorate vote. Pink background denotes a candidate elected from their party list. Yellow background denotes an electorate win by a list member, or other incumbent. A ✓ or ✗ denotes status of any incumbent, win or lose respectively.						
Party	Candidate	Votes	%	±%	Party votes	%	±%
AfD	Enrico Komning	75,083	45.2	▲20.9	71,490	42.8	▲19.6
CDU	Philipp Amthor	33,050	19.9	▼0.8	28,878	17.3	▼1.7
BSW					19,002	11.4	New
SPD	✗ Erik von Malottki	22,871	13.8	▼11.0	16,306	9.8	▼16.9
Left	Amina Kanew	18,008	10.8	▲0.1	15,824	9.5	▼0.7
FDP	Christian Bartelt	5,881	3.5	▼3.9	5,252	3.1	▼4.4
FW	Gerhard Friedrich	4,772	2.9	▲1.2	1,679	1.0	▼0.4
Greens	Katharina Horn	3,787	2.3	▼1.8	4,721	2.8	▼1.6
Tierschutzpartei					2,524	1.5	▼1.0
Volt					645	0.4	▲0.3
BD					420	0.3	New
MLPD					97	0.1	0.0
Informal votes		2,154			1,400		
Total valid votes		166,084			166,838		
Turnout		168,238	78.0	▲8.3			
AfD gain from SPD	Majority	42,033	25.3	N/A			

=== 2021 election ===
Federal election (2021): Mecklenburgische Seenplatte I – Vorpommern-Greifswald II
Notes:	Blue background denotes the winner of the electorate vote. Pink background denotes a candidate elected from their party list. Yellow background denotes an electorate win by a list member, or other incumbent. A ✓ or ✗ denotes status of any incumbent, win or lose respectively.						
Party	Candidate	Votes	%	±%	Party votes	%	±%
SPD	Erik von Malottki	37,392	24.8	▲10.9	40,339	26.7	▲14.4
AfD	Enrico Komning	36,597	24.3	▲0.8	35,102	23.2	▲0.2
CDU	✗ Philipp Amthor	31,182	20.7	▼10.5	28,684	19.0	▼14.5
Left	Toni Jaschinski	16,202	10.8	▼8.3	15,370	10.2	▼7.4
FDP	Christian Bartelt	11,165	7.4	▲1.6	11,438	7.6	▲2.0
Greens	Katharina Horn	6,112	4.1	▲1.5	6,616	4.4	▲1.8
Tierschutzpartei	Anja Hübner	4,765	3.2		3,803	2.5	▲1.3
dieBasis	Wolfgang Wodarg	3,257	2.2		2,822	1.9	
FW	Matthias Andiel	2,468	1.6	▲0.4	2,183	1.4	▲0.7
NPD					2,006	1.3	▼0.7
PARTEI					1,033	0.7	▼0.2
Unabhängige	Sophie Maus	1,019	0.7				
Pirates					518	0.3	
Independent	Sören Krüger	509	0.3				
Team Todenhöfer					348	0.2	
Humanists					220	0.1	
Volt					204	0.1	
DKP					140	0.1	
ÖDP					123	0.1	0.0
MLPD					89	0.1	▼0.1
Informal votes		3,572			3,202		
Total valid votes		150,668			151,038		
Turnout		154,240	69.7	▲0.2			
SPD gain from CDU	Majority	796	0.5				

=== 2017 election ===
Federal election (2017): Mecklenburgische Seenplatte I – Vorpommern-Greifswald II
Notes:	Blue background denotes the winner of the electorate vote. Pink background denotes a candidate elected from their party list. Yellow background denotes an electorate win by a list member, or other incumbent. A ✓ or ✗ denotes status of any incumbent, win or lose respectively.						
Party	Candidate	Votes	%	±%	Party votes	%	±%
CDU	Philipp Amthor	48,269	31.2	▼14.7	51,789	33.5	▼11.5
AfD	Enrico Komning	36,273	23.5		35,595	23.0	▲16.9
Left	Toni Jaschinski	29,462	19.1	▼4.9	27,246	17.6	▼4.0
SPD	Heiko Miraß	21,493	13.9	▼1.8	19,064	12.3	▼2.4
FDP	Christian Bartelt	8,909	5.8	▲3.9	8,659	5.6	▲3.6
Greens	Timo Elias Pfarr	3,898	2.5	▲0.2	4,068	2.6	▼0.1
NPD	Michael Andrejewski	2,834	1.8	▼4.0	3,148	2.0	▼2.8
FW	Klaus-Dieter Gabbert	1,991	1.3	▼0.6	1,092	0.7	▼0.3
Tierschutzpartei					1,954	1.3	
PARTEI	Roland Gorsleben	1,499	1.0		1,340	0.9	
BGE					548	0.3	
MLPD					169	0.1	0.0
ÖDP					141	0.1	
Informal votes		2,337			2,152		
Total valid votes		154,628			154,813		
Turnout		156,965	69.4	▲5.9			
CDU hold	Majority	11,996	7.7	▼14.3			

=== 2013 election ===
Federal election (2013): Mecklenburgische Seenplatte I – Vorpommern-Greifswald II
Notes:	Blue background denotes the winner of the electorate vote. Pink background denotes a candidate elected from their party list. Yellow background denotes an electorate win by a list member, or other incumbent. A ✓ or ✗ denotes status of any incumbent, win or lose respectively.						
Party	Candidate	Votes	%	±%	Party votes	%	±%
CDU	Matthias Lietz	67,069	45.9	▲10.6	65,767	44.9	▲9.4
Left	Torsten Koplin	34,972	23.9	▼7.0	31,658	21.6	▼8.1
SPD	Holm-Henning Freier	22,870	15.7	▲0.3	21,603	14.8	▲0.8
AfD					8,850	6.0	
NPD	Tino Müller	8,525	5.8	▲0.3	6,755	4.6	▼0.6
Pirates	Uwe Bastian	3,825	2.6		2,629	1.8	▼0.3
Greens	Ralf-Peter Hässelbarth	3,359	2.3	▼1.3	4,010	2.7	▼1.1
FW	Volker Böhning	2,781	1.9		1,523	1.0	
FDP	Christian Bartelt	2,695	1.8	▼6.0	2,910	2.0	▼7.3
PRO					337	0.2	
MLPD					162	0.1	▼0.1
REP					155	0.1	▼0.1
Informal votes		2,778			2,514		
Total valid votes		146,096			146,360		
Turnout		148,874	63.6	▲1.6			
CDU win new seat	Majority	32,097	22.0				
