= Hagen Reinhold =

German politician (born 1978)

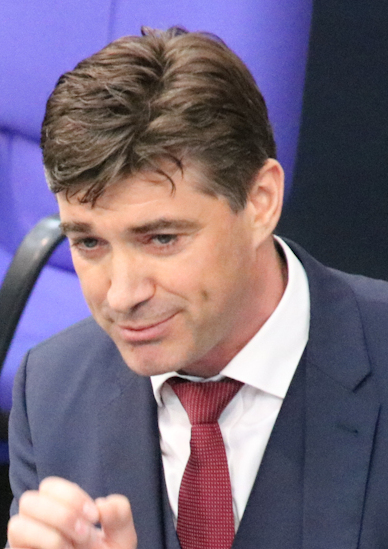

Member of the Bundestag
- In office 2017 – 3 September 2023
- In office 2013–2013

Personal details
- Born: 23 March 1978 (age 48) Wismar
- Party: FDP
- Children: 3

Hagen Reinhold (born 23 March 1978) is a German politician of the Free Democratic Party (FDP) who has served as a member of the Bundestag from the state of Mecklenburg-Vorpommern from 2017 to 2023.

== Political career ==
In parliament, Reinhold has been a member of the Committee on Building, Housing, Urban Development and Local Government since 2018. Since 2021, he has been serving as his parliamentary group’s spokesperson for the maritime industry.

In addition to his committee assignments, Reinhold has been part of the German delegation to the Baltic Sea Parliamentary Conference (BSPC).

In the negotiations to form a so-called traffic light coalition of the Social Democratic Party (SPD), the Green Party and the FDP under Chancellor Olaf Scholz following the 2021 federal elections, Reinhold was part of his party's delegation in the working group on building and housing, chaired by Kevin Kühnert, Christian Kühn and Daniel Föst.

Reinhold renounced his membership in the 20th German Bundestag on July 4, 2023 and left parliament on September 3, 2023. He was succeeded by Christian Bartelt.

== Personal life ==
On 12 March 2020, during the COVID-19 pandemic, it was announced that Reinhold had tested positive for COVID-19.

In December 2022, Reinhold separated from his long-term partner Karoline Preisler to pursue a relationship with former pornographic actress Annina Ucatis.
