= Helmut Holter =

German politician

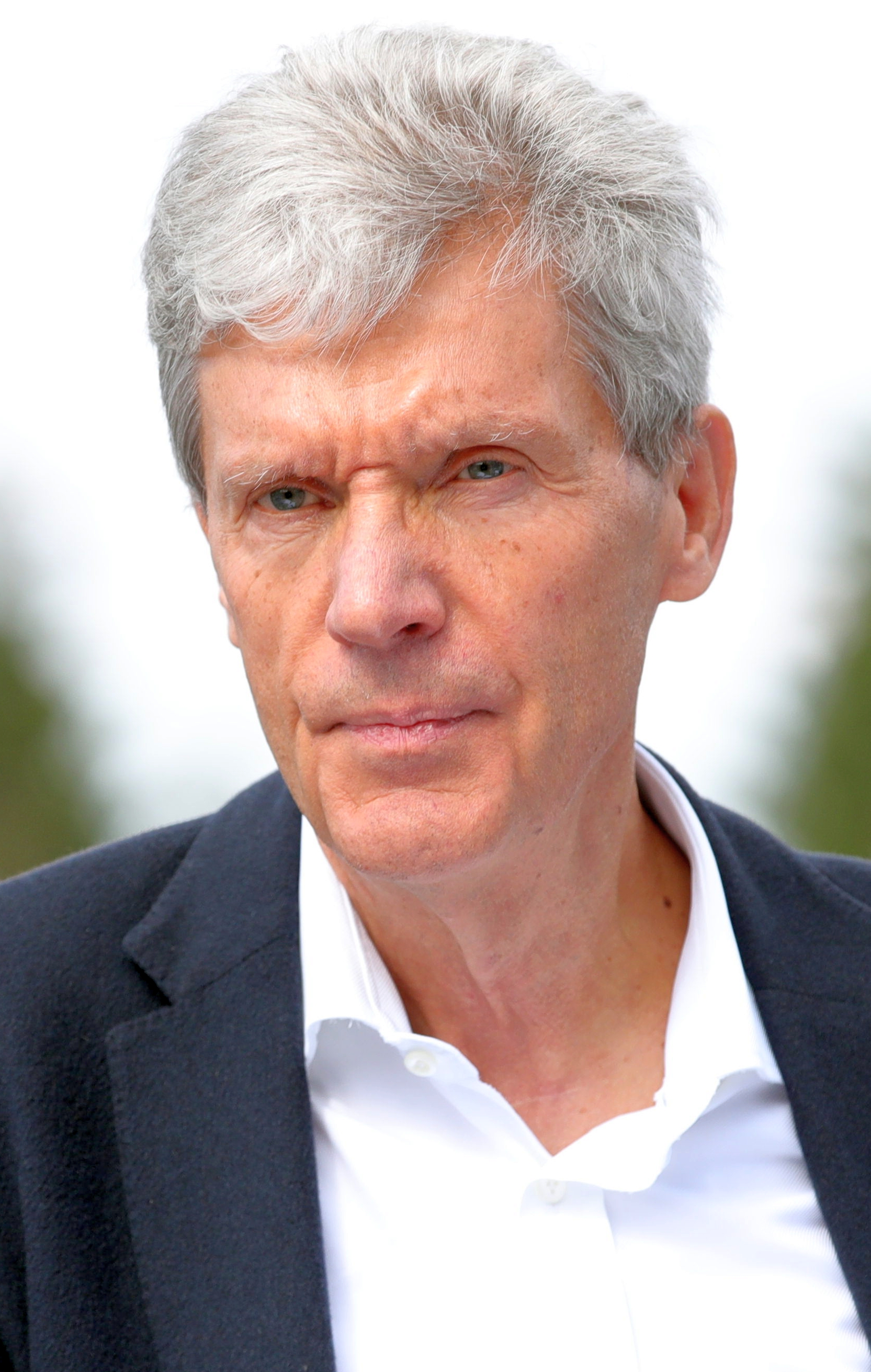
Helmut Holter (2022)

Helmut Holter (born 22 May 1953) is a German politician of the party The Left. From 1998 to 2006 he was Minister for Labor and Construction of the German state of Mecklenburg-Vorpommern. From April 2009 to September 2016 he was chairman of The Left parliamentary group in the Landtag of Mecklenburg-Vorpommern. Since August 2017 he has been Minister for Education, Youth and Sport in the state of Thuringia.

== Biography ==
Holter was born in Ludwigslust. He completed his schooling in Halle (Saale) in 1971 and studied Civil engineering in Moscow. Since 1973 he was a member of the SED. In 1976 he completed his studies as an Engineer for Concrete Technologies in Moscow. He then worked at a VEB in Milmersdorf near Templin. From 1981 to 1985 he was Secretary of the SED factory organisation. Since 1985, Holter studied at the CPSU Party High School in Moscow and finished postgraduate studies in Society Sciences in 1987. Until 1989 he worked in the Department of Construction/Transportation/Energy of the SED District Administration in Neubrandenburg.

From 1991 to 2001 Holter was State Chairman of the SED follow-up party PDS in Mecklenburg-Vorpommern. From 2000 to 2002 he also was a member of the German PDS board. From November 1994 to 31 December 2002 and again from 2006 onward he was an MP of the Landtag of Mecklenburg-Vorpommern. In 1998, Holter became Minister for Labor and Construction in Mecklenburg-Vorpommern under Minister President Harald Ringstorff. In 2011 and 2016, Holter was frontrunner of The Left in the Mecklenburg-Vorpommern state elections.

After the resignation of Birgit Klaubert as Minister for Education, Youth and Sport in the state of Thuringia, Holter was officially named as her successor and sworn in on 17 August 2017.

== Literature ==
- Helmut Müller-Enbergs: Holter, Helmut . In: Wer war wer in der DDR? 5. ed. Vol. 1, Ch. Links, Berlin 2010, ISBN 978-3-86153-561-4.
