= Christian Pegel =

German politician (born 1974)

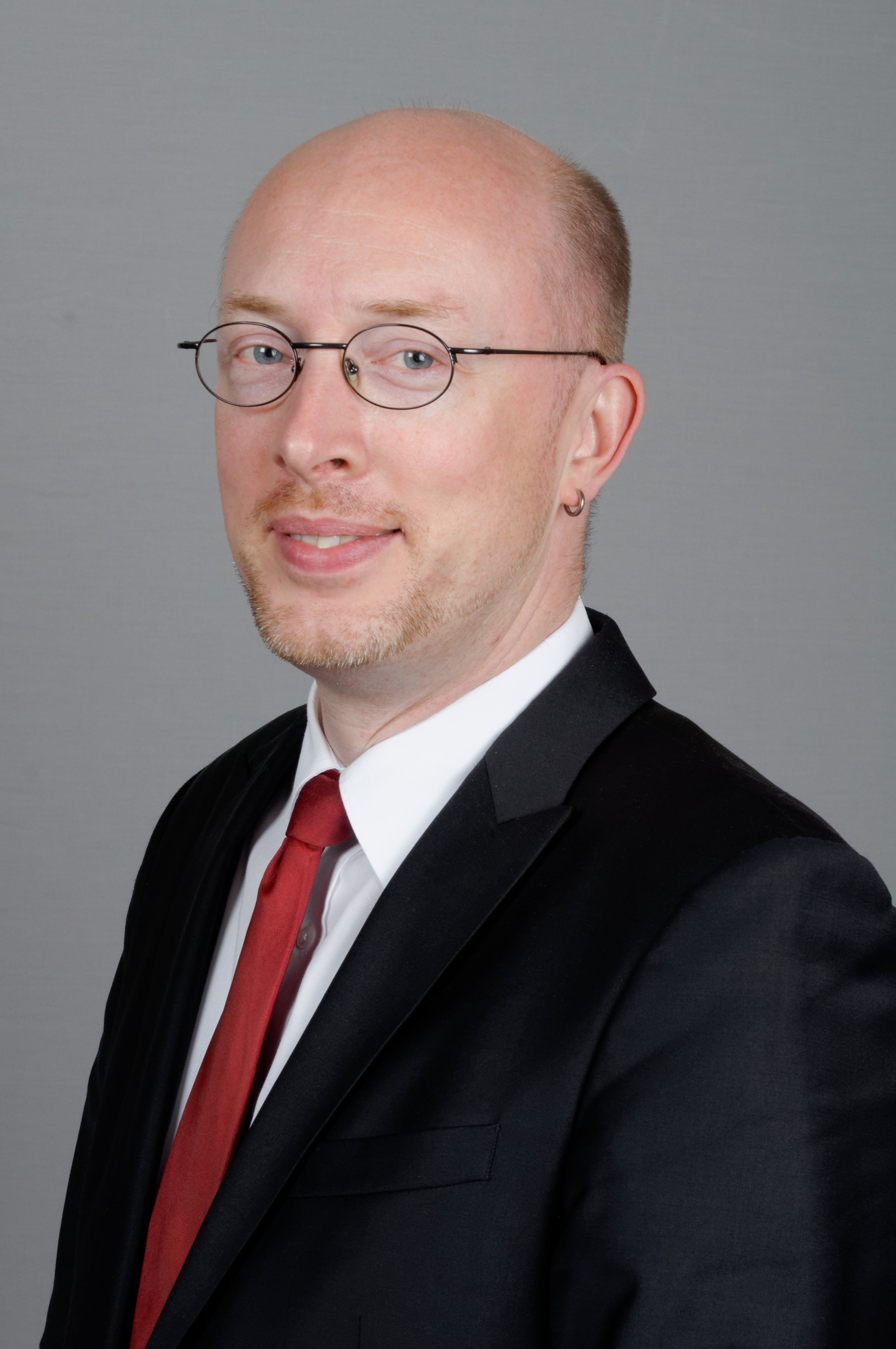
- Pegel in 2017

Minister of the Interior and Construction of Mecklenburg-Vorpommern
- Incumbent
- Assumed office 15 November 2021
- Minister-President: Manuela Schwesig
- Preceded by: Torsten Renz

Personal details
- Born: 7 January 1974 (age 52) Hamburg
- Party: Social Democratic Party (since 1990)

Christian Pegel (born 7 January 1974 in Hamburg) is a German politician serving as minister of the interior and construction of Mecklenburg-Vorpommern since 2021. From 2016 to 2021, he served as minister of energy, infrastructure and digitalization. From 2014 to 2016, he served as minister of energy, infrastructure and regional development. He has been a member of the Landtag of Mecklenburg-Vorpommern since 2016.
