= 2011 Mecklenburg-Vorpommern state election =

German state election

- 4 September 2011

All 71 seats in the Landtag 36 seats needed for a majority
- Turnout: 651,375 (51.5%) ▼7.7pp
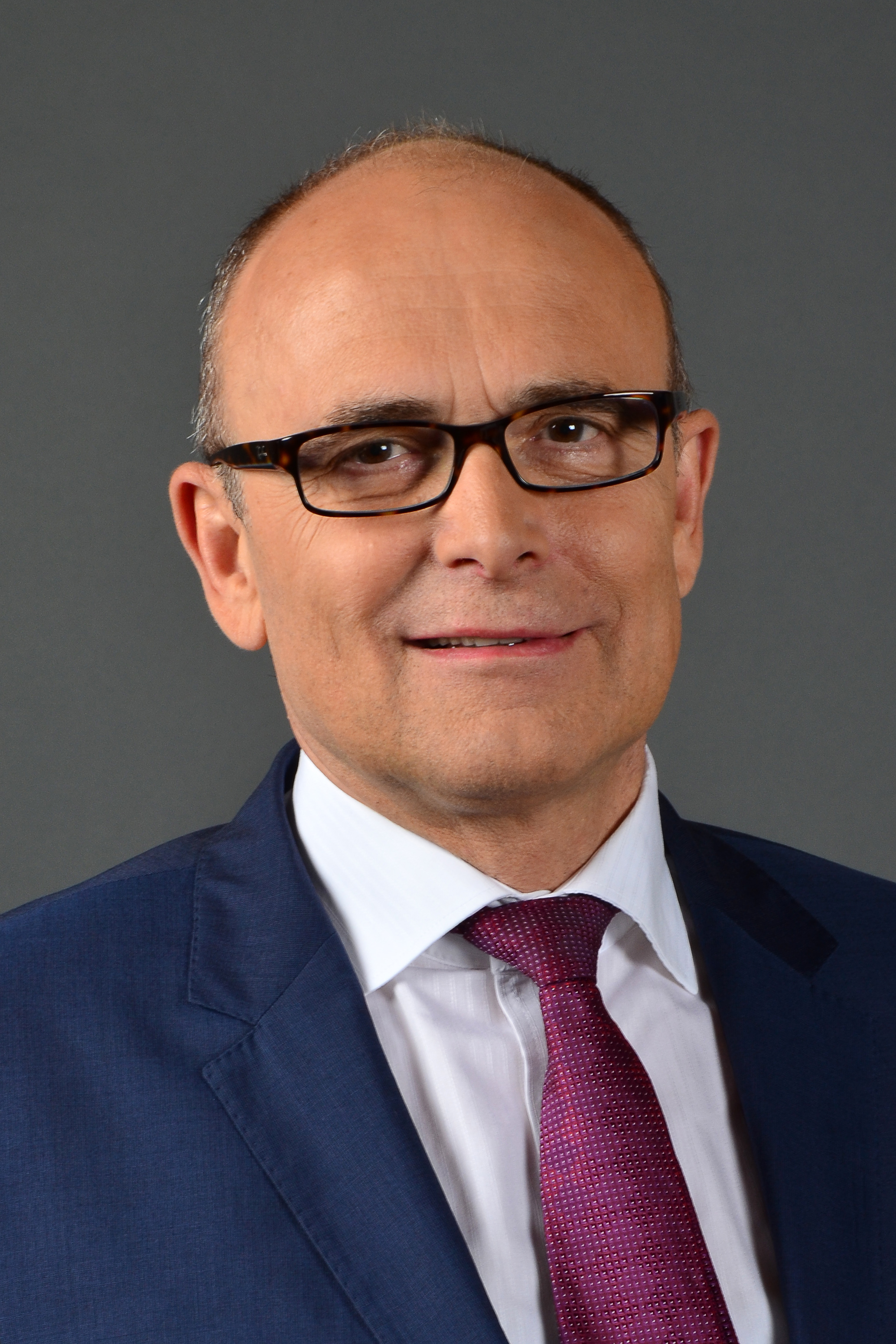

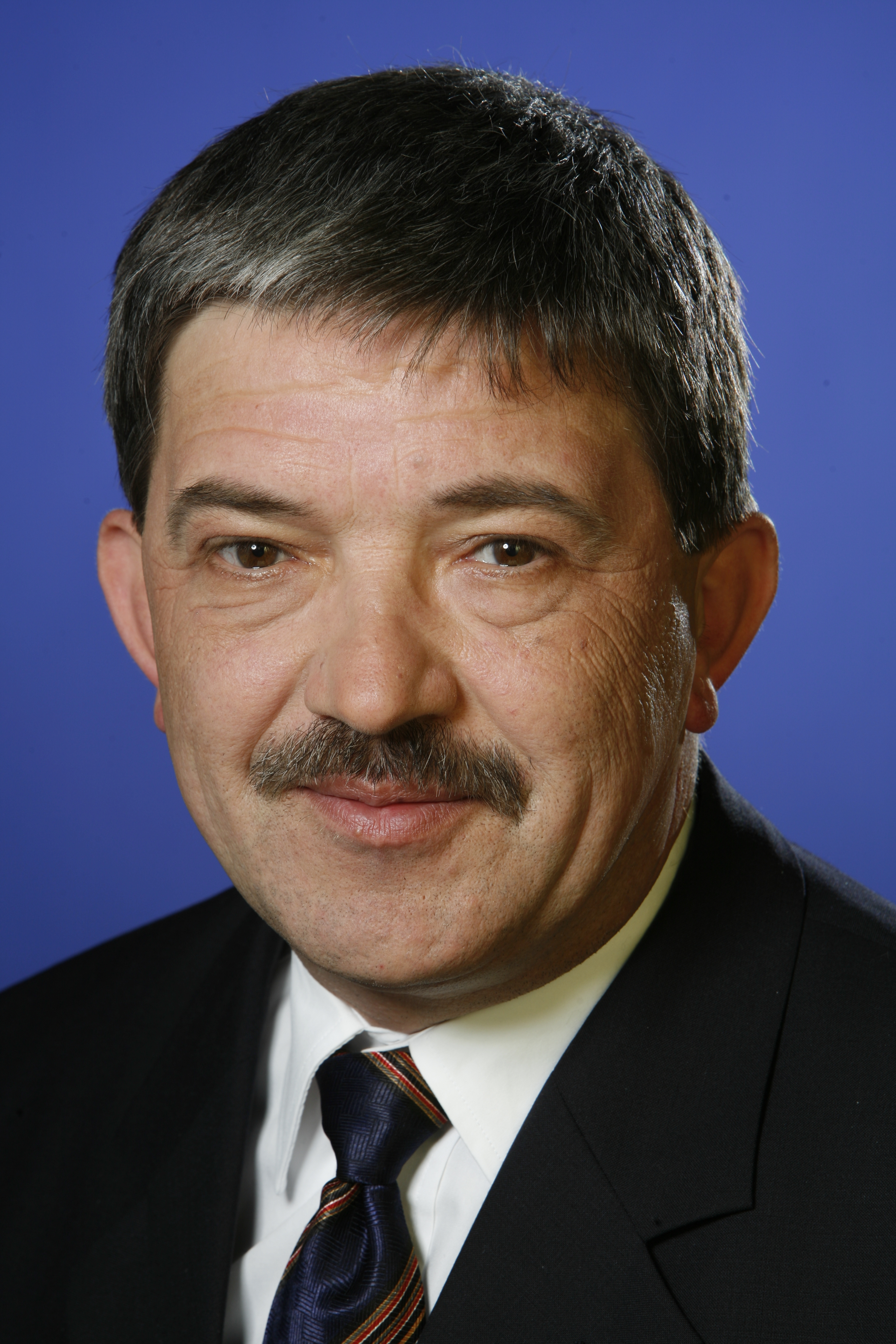

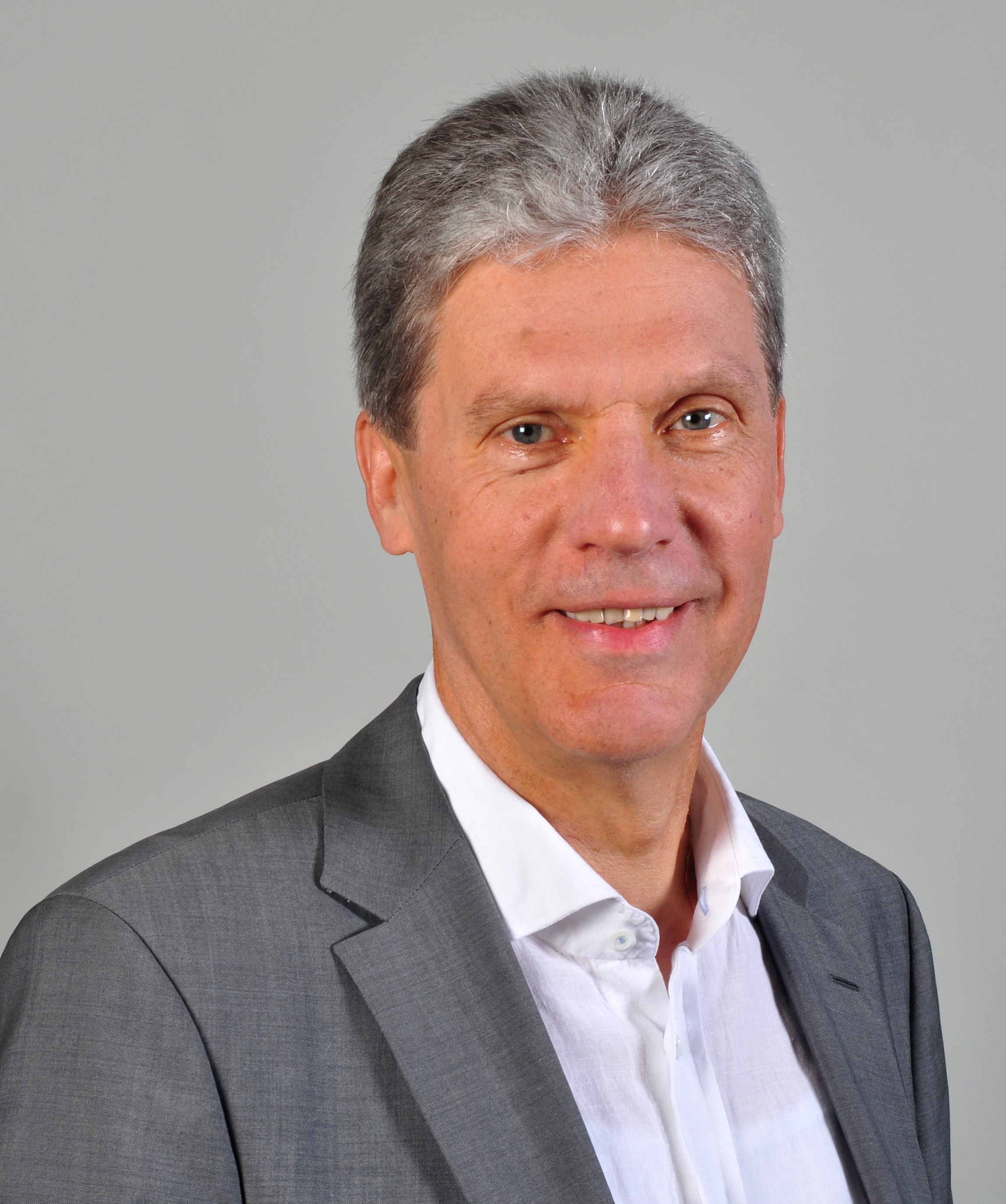

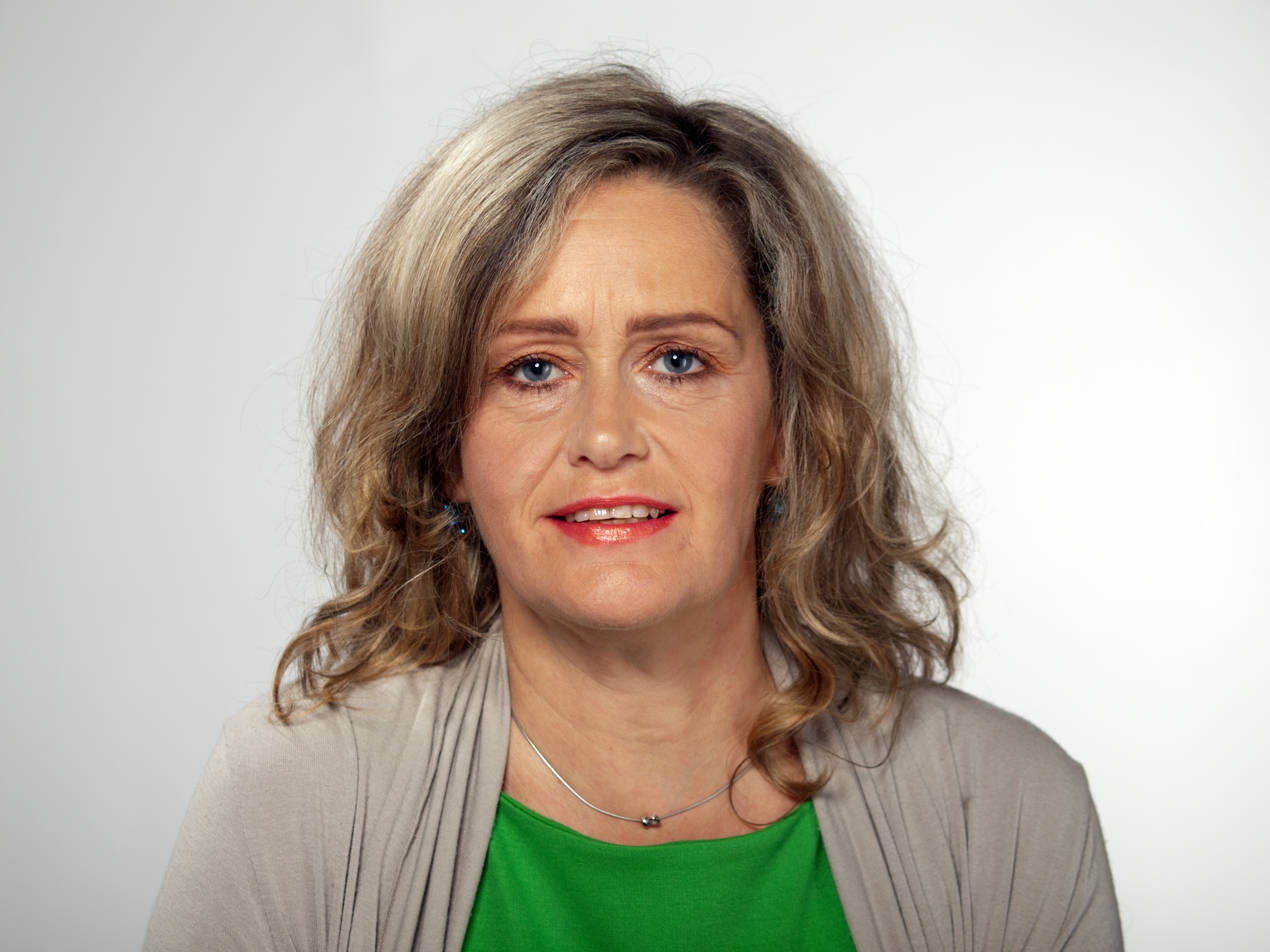

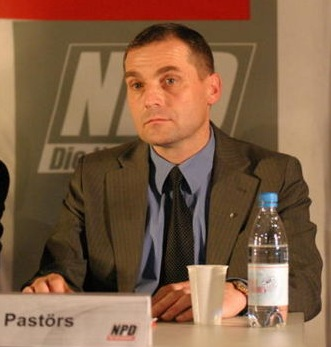
| | First party | Second party | Third party |
|---|---|---|---|
| Candidate | Erwin Sellering | Lorenz Caffier | Helmut Holter |
| Party | SPD | CDU | Left |
| Last election | 30.2%, 23 seats | 28.8%, 22 seats | 17.3%, 13 seats (Note: Results for PDS (16.8%) and WASG (0.5%)) |
| Seats won | 27 | 18 | 14 |
| Seat change | ▲4 | ▼4 | ▲1 |
| Popular vote | 242,251 | 156,969 | 125,528 |
| Percentage | 35.6% | 23.0% | 18.4% |
| Swing | ▲5.4pp | ▼5.8pp | ▲1.1pp |
| | Fourth party | Fifth party | Sixth party |
| | | | FDP |
| Candidate | Silke Gajek | Udo Pastörs | Gino Leonhard |
| Party | Greens | NPD | FDP |
| Last election | 3.4%, 0 seats | 7.3%, 6 seats | 9.6%, 7 seats |
| Seats won | 7 | 5 | 0 |
| Seat change | ▲7 | ▼1 | ▼7 |
| Popular vote | 59,004 | 40,642 | 18,943 |
| Percentage | 8.7% | 6.0% | 2.8% |
| Swing | ▲5.3pp | ▼1.3pp | ▼6.8pp |
- Results for the single-member constituencies
Minister-President before election
Erwin Sellering
SPD
Elected Minister-President
Erwin Sellering
SPD

The 2011 Mecklenburg-Vorpommern state election was held on 4 September 2011 to elect the members of the 6th Landtag of Mecklenburg-Vorpommern. The incumbent grand coalition of the Social Democratic Party (SPD) and Christian Democratic Union (CDU) led by Minister-President Erwin Sellering retained its majority and continued in government.

== Issues and campaign ==
=== Christian Democratic Union ===
The Christian Democrats 30-page election platform was called "clear and decisive". The platform includes education policy, finances and population change.

The Christian Democrats campaigned with the slogan "C wie Zukunft" ("C for Future"). This was intended to link the first letter of both the party's and the frontrunner Lorenz Caffier's name with the positive term "future". However, recipients understood that the CDU suggested to write the word "Zukunft" with a "C". This earned the conservatives scorn and derision.

=== Social Democratic Party ===
Social Democrats focused on issues of economy, labor, energy change, social justice, family and education.

In the government SPD plans same time to cancel the tax release of the hotels and restaurants with a value of 1.7 billion euros, collect 2 billion euros by the higher peak tax and further 1.7 billion euros by increase of the nuclear plant fuel tax.

=== The Left ===
The Left platform includes employment and economic rights, social justice, environmental protection and more democratic participation.

== Parties ==
The table below lists parties represented in the 5th Landtag of Mecklenburg-Vorpommern.

| Name | | Ideology | Leader(s) | 2006 result | |
| Name | | Ideology | Leader(s) | Votes (%) | Seats |
|---|---|---|---|---|---|
| SPD | Social Democratic Party of Germany; Sozialdemokratische Partei Deutschlands | Social democracy | Erwin Sellering | 30.2% | 23 / 71 |
| CDU | Christian Democratic Union of Germany; Christlich Demokratische Union Deutschlands | Christian democracy | Lorenz Caffier | 28.8% | 22 / 71 |
| Linke | The Left; Die Linke | Democratic socialism | Helmut Holter | 17.3% (Note: Results for PDS (16.8%) and WASG (0.5%).) | 13 / 71 |
| FDP | Free Democratic Party; Freie Demokratische Partei | Classical liberalism | Gino Leonhard | 9.6% | 7 / 71 |
| NPD | National Democratic Party of Germany; Nationaldemokratische Partei Deutschlands | Neo-Nazism | Udo Pastörs | 7.3% | 6 / 71 |

== Opinion polling ==
| Polling firm | Fieldwork date | Sample size | SPD | CDU | Linke | FDP | NPD | Grüne | Others | Lead |
|---|---|---|---|---|---|---|---|---|---|---|
| 2011 state election | 4 Sep 2011 | – | 35.6 | 23.0 | 18.4 | 2.8 | 6.0 | 8.7 | 5.6 | 12.6 |
| Forschungsgruppe Wahlen | 22–25 Aug 2011 | 1,349 | 35 | 28 | 16.5 | 4 | 4.5 | 8 | 4 | 7 |
| Infratest dimap | 23–25 Aug 2011 | 1,000 | 36 | 26 | 17 | 4.5 | 4.5 | 8 | 4 | 10 |
| Forsa | 15–18 Aug 2011 | 602 | 34 | 27 | 17 | 5 | 5 | 7 | 5 | 7 |
| Infratest dimap | 12–17 Aug 2011 | 1,000 | 37.0 | 28.0 | 17.5 | 3.5 | 4.0 | 7.0 | 3.0 | 9.0 |
| Emnid | 8–11 Aug 2011 | 1,000 | 34 | 28 | 19 | 4 | 4 | 7 | 4 | 6 |
| Emnid | 29 Jul–4 Aug 2011 | 1,007 | 34 | 29 | 19 | 3 | – | 7 | 8 | 5 |
| Infratest dimap | 29 Jul–2 Aug 2011 | 1,001 | 34 | 30 | 18 | 3 | 4 | 8 | 3 | 4 |
| Infratest dimap | 24–28 Jun 2011 | 1,000 | 34 | 30 | 17 | 4 | 4 | 8 | 3 | 4 |
| Infratest dimap | 8–11 Apr 2011 | 1,001 | 34 | 27 | 20 | 3 | 3 | 10 | 3 | 7 |
| Emnid | 25 Feb–1 Mar 2011 | 1,000 | 34 | 29 | 17 | 5 | 4 | 6 | 4 | 5 |
| Forsa | 3–6 Jan 2011 | 601 | 32 | 29 | 15 | 6 | 5 | 8 | 5 | 3 |
| Infratest dimap | 11–13 May 2009 | 1,000 | 25 | 32 | 22 | 10 | 4 | 5 | 2 | 7 |
| polis+sinus | 1–16 Dec 2008 | 1,205 | 27 | 30 | 23 | 11 | 4 | 3 | 2 | 3 |
| Infratest | 8–11 Oct 2007 | 1,000 | 34 | 32 | 17 | 7 | 4 | 3 | 3 | 2 |
| Forsa | 20 Aug–18 Sep 2007 | 1,009 | 28 | 31 | 18 | 9 | 7 | 3 | 4 | 3 |
| 2006 state election | 17 Sep 2006 | – | 30.2 | 28.8 | 16.8 | 9.6 | 7.3 | 3.4 | 3.9 | 1.4 |

== Election result ==
The Social Democratic Party (SPD) were the clear winners of election with 35.7 percent of the votes. It increased 5.5 percentage points over the last election in 2006. The Christian Democratic Union (CDU) support fell by 5.7 percent, ending up with 23.1 percent. The Free Democratic Party (FDP) got only 2.7 percent of the vote, a massive drop of 6.9 percent compared to the last election, when it received 9.6 percent. The FDP failed to qualify for the Landtag for the fifth time in the last six state elections. The FDP Chairman Philipp Rösler claimed responsibility for failing to qualify for the Landtag. The Green Party reached the 5% minimum and qualified for the first time in Landtag of Mecklenburg-Vorpommern. The Greens have now seats in all of Germany's 16 state parliaments.

The far right National Democratic Party (NPD) won in excess of 30% of the votes in 2 of the districts in this election and 26% to 29% in some communities near Anklam and Torgelow. In Koblentz, the NPD finished 15% higher than the CDU and the SPD. Leaders of some of the parties have come out and stated their opposition and shock at the success of the NPD. Rösler also stated that "it is shocking that the radical right-wing NPD has received twice as many votes as the FDP". SPD leader Erwin Sellering wasn't happy about the NPD re-entering the Landtag and stated "It’s a shame that they’ve made it in again and very regrettable".

Summary of the 4 September 2011 election results for the Landtag of Mecklenburg-Vorpommern
| Party | Votes | % | +/- | Seats | +/- | Seats % |
|---|---|---|---|---|---|---|
| Social Democratic Party (SPD) | 242,251 | 35.6 | ▲5.4 | 27 | ▲4 | 38.0 |
| Christian Democratic Union (CDU) | 156,969 | 23.0 | ▼5.8 | 18 | ▼4 | 25.4 |
| The Left (DIE LINKE) | 125,528 | 18.4 | ▲1.1 (Note: Results for PDS (16.8%) and WASG (0.5%)) | 14 | ▲1 (Note: Results for PDS (13 seats) and WASG (0 seats)) | 19.7 |
| Alliance 90/The Greens (GRÜNE) | 59,004 | 8.7 | ▲5.3 | 7 | ▲7 | 9.9 |
| National Democratic Party (NPD) | 40,642 | 6.0 | ▼1.3 | 5 | ▼1 | 7.0 |
| Free Democratic Party (FDP) | 18,943 | 2.8 | ▼6.8 | 0 | ▼7 | 0 |
| Pirate Party Germany (PIRATEN) | 12,727 | 1.9 | ▲1.9 | 0 | 0 | 0 |
| Family Party (FAMILIE) | 10,538 | 1.5 | ▲0.3 | 0 | 0 | 0 |
| Other parties | 14,773 | 2.2 | ▼0.6 | 0 | 0 | 0 |
| Total | 681,375 | 100.0 | | 71 | 0 | |
| Voter turnout | | 51.5 | ▼7.7 | | | |

Popular Vote
| SPD | 35.55% |
| CDU | 23.04% |
| DIE LINKE | 18.42% |
| GRÜNE | 8.66% |
| NPD | 5.96% |
| FDP | 2.78% |
| PIRATEN | 1.87% |
| FAMILIE | 1.55% |
| Other | 2.17% |

Landtag seats
| SPD | 38.03% |
| CDU | 25.35% |
| DIE LINKE | 19.72% |
| GRÜNE | 9.86% |
| NPD | 7.04% |
