= Free Horizon =

Free Horizon FREiER HORIZONT
- Leader: Norbert Schumacher
- Founded: February 27, 2016; 9 years ago
- Membership (2021): 40
- Ideology: Anti-Wind turbine
- Political position: Single-issue

Website
- freier-horizont.de

Free Horizon (German: FREiER HORIZONT), is a minor single-issue political party in Germany that opposes the expansion of wind turbine infrastructure. It is primarily active in the state of Mecklenburg-Vorpommern.

== History ==
=== Foundation ===
The party's predecessor, the Aktionsbündnis Gegen den unkontrollierten Windkraftausbau - Freier Horizont was founded on 22 November 2014 in Ivenack as a merger of over 40 local associations and citizens' initiatives that opposed the expansion of wind turbine infrastructure in their areas. This group aimed to initiate a citizens' initiative to restrict the construction of new wind turbines in the state of Mecklenburg-Vorpommern. After 22,000 signatures were collected and the initiative presented, it was rejected by the Landtag. Following this defeat, the group announced the foundation of a new political party named FREiER HORIZONT, aiming to contest in the 2016 state election.

The party was founded on 27 February 2016 in Altentreptow which lies in the most wind turbine-dense area in the country. The 32 founding members elected Norbert Schumacher, a veterinarian, as the party's leader. He has remained in this position since.

=== Ballot controversy ===
Upon its registration for the 2016 Mecklenburg-Vorpommern state election, FREiER HORIZONT noted the absence of a short-form for the party on the ballot, believing the missing abbreviation to impair voters' ability to find the party on the ballot. When asked about the party's official short-form however, Schumacher stated that the party neither had nor wanted one, as was corroborated in the party's statute at the time. The state returning officer, Doris Petersen-Goes, denied any wrongdoing and noted that the office couldn't print something on the ballots that doesn't exist. The office further denied the reprint of ballots, which the party had demanded. The situation was covered in an episode of Realer Irrsinn on the political satire show extra 3.

The party received 0.7% of the vote (5,793 votes) in the election and thus missed the 5%-threshold for entry into the Landtag. After the controversy, the party changed its statute to use its full name, FREiER HORIZONT, as its official short-form.

=== Local engagement ===
The party entered four district councils with a total of six seats during the 2019 Mecklenburg-Vorpommern local elections. FREiER HORIZONT did not however participate in the 2024 Mecklenburg-Vorpommern local elections as a political party, instead splitting itself into multiple separate voters' associations, one per district. Two of these associations, the ones in Mecklenburgische Seenplatte and Ludwigslust-Parchim, won two and one seat respectively. The FREiER HORIZONT members in both district councils formed a faction with the Sahra Wagenknecht Alliance.

== Organisation ==
Norbert Schumacher has been the leader of the party since its foundation.

The party had 60 members in June 2016 and 80 members in August 2016. This number decreased to 40 in 2021.

== Program ==
The party views itself as neither left, right, or in the centre. Despite its focus on one primary issue, FREiER HORIZONT declines being labeled a single-issue party, as the party also focuses on rural development and the expansion of funding towards cultural projects. Martin Koschklar, a political scientist from Rostock however, does view the party as focused on single-issue politics.

Although the predecessor of FREiER HORIZONT initially established limited cooperation with the Alternative for Germany (AfD), due to similar views on wind turbines, Schumacher soon distanced his party from the AfD, differentiating his party though different views on immigration and a "more constructive" appearance.

== Election results ==
=== State elections ===
Year	MV				
Year	Party list		Constituency		Seats
Year	Votes	%	Votes	%	Seats
2016	5,793	0.7	6,603	0.8	0
2021	2,491	0.3	3,348	0.4	0
