= Enrico Schult =

German politician (born 1979)

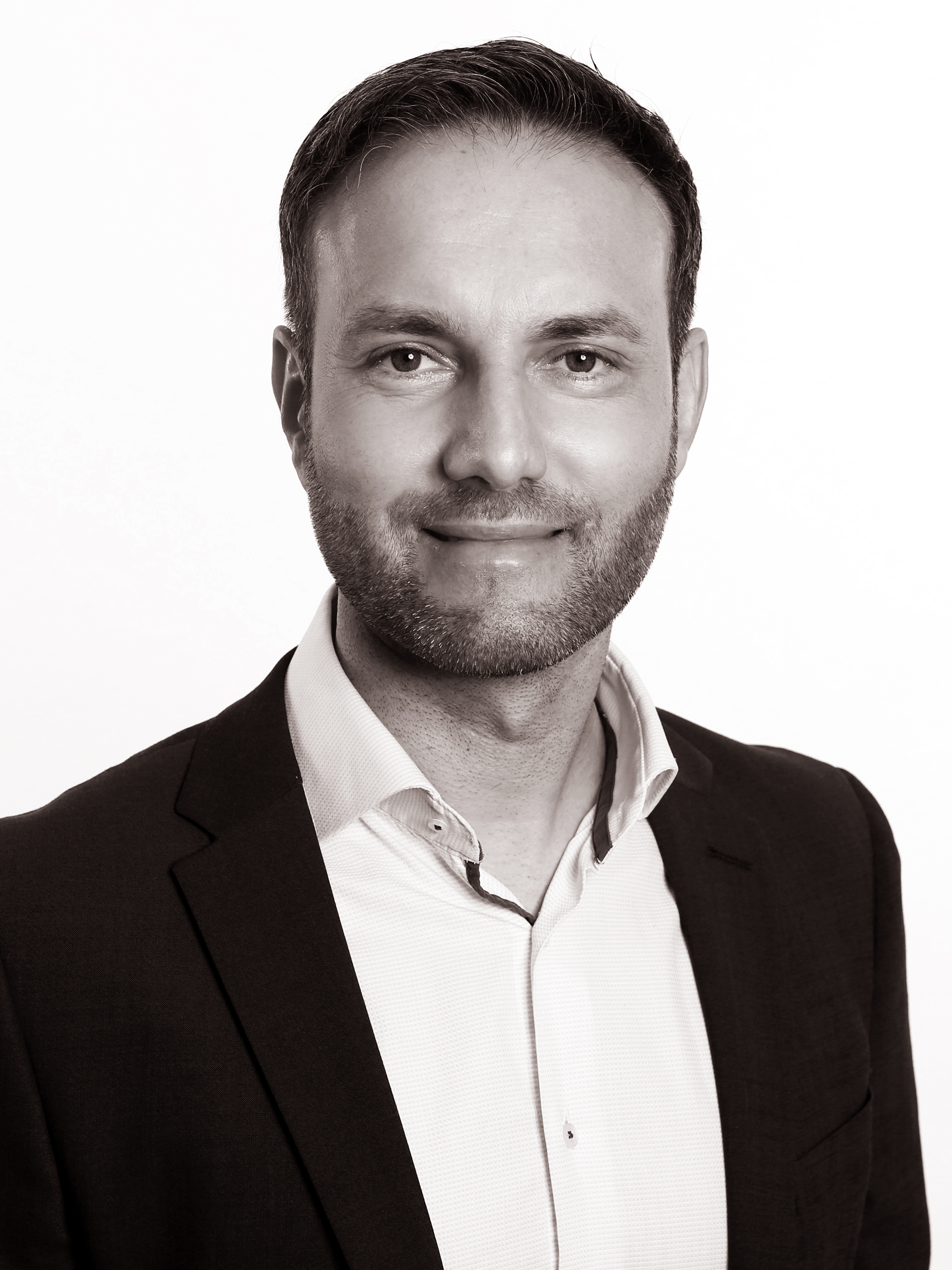
- Schult in 2021

Member of the Landtag of Mecklenburg-Vorpommern
- Incumbent
- Assumed office 26 October 2021

Personal details
- Born: 18 April 1979 (age 47) Demmin, Germany
- Party: Alternative for Germany (since 2015)

Enrico Schult (born 18 April 1979) is a German politician serving as a member of the Landtag of Mecklenburg-Vorpommern since 2021. He has served as co-chairman of AfD Mecklenburg-Vorpommern since 2021.
