= 2016 Mecklenburg-Vorpommern state election =

German state election

- 4 September 2016

All 71 seats in the Landtag 36 seats needed for a majority
- Turnout: 821,581 (61.9%) ▲10.4pp
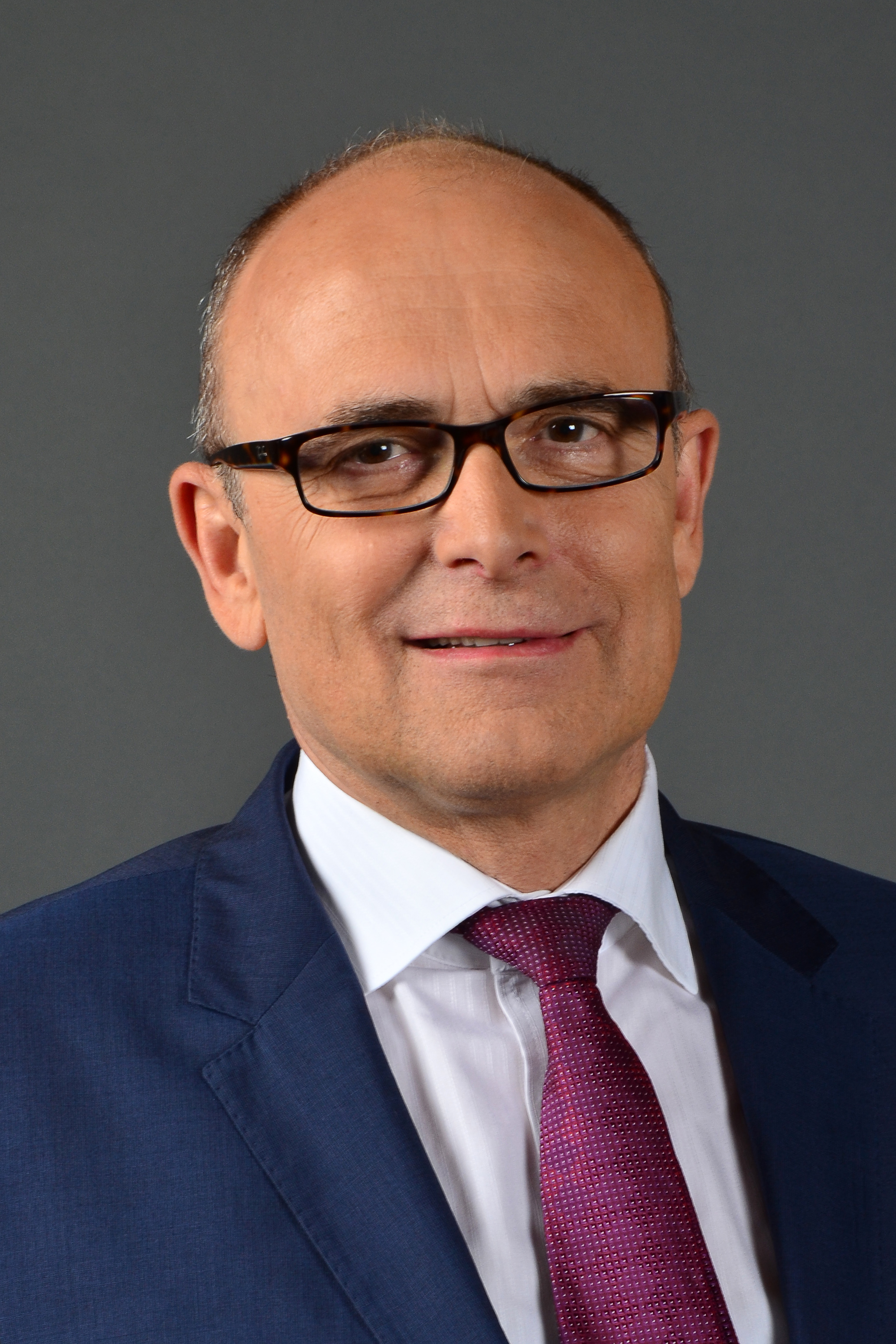

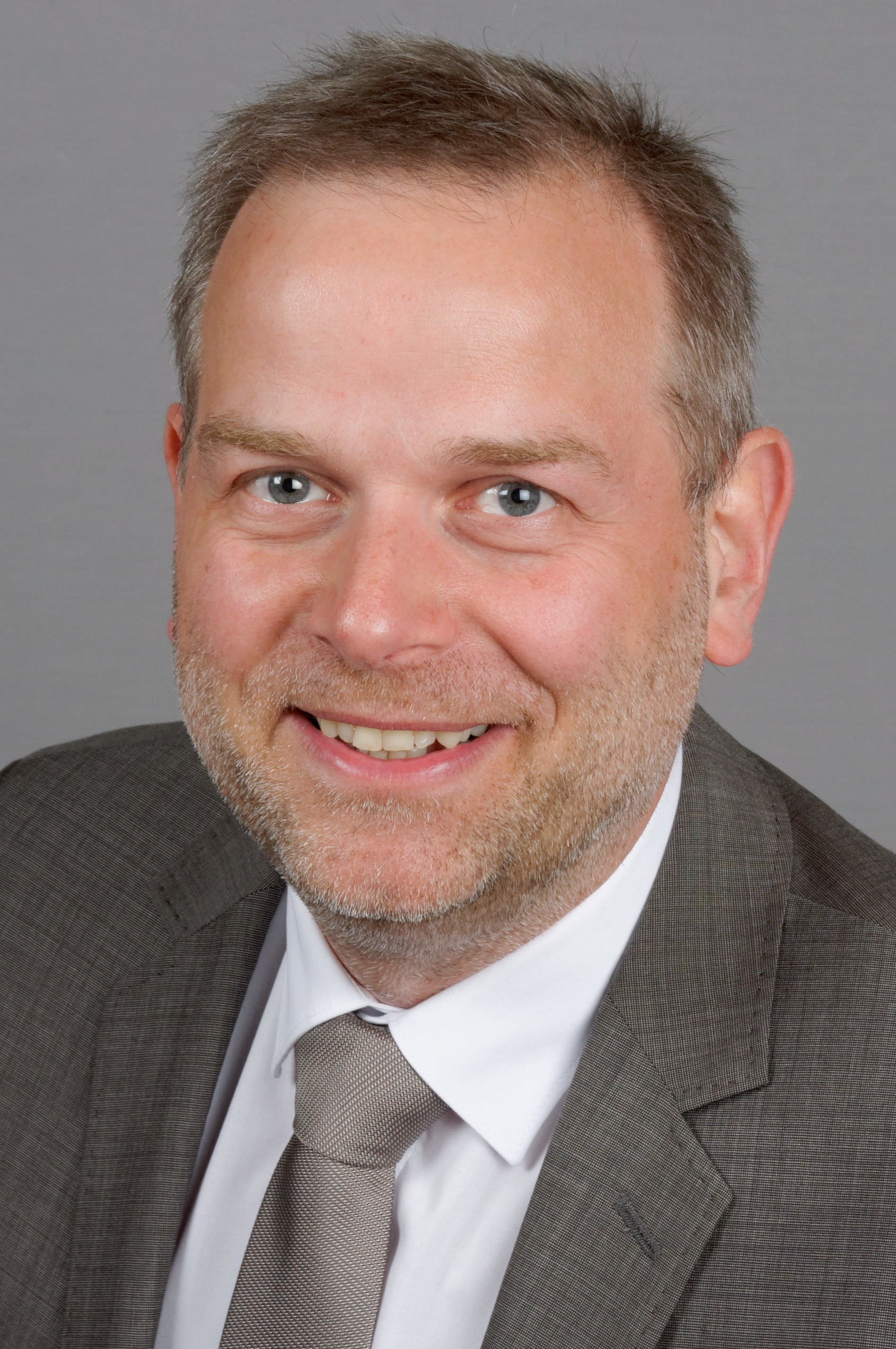

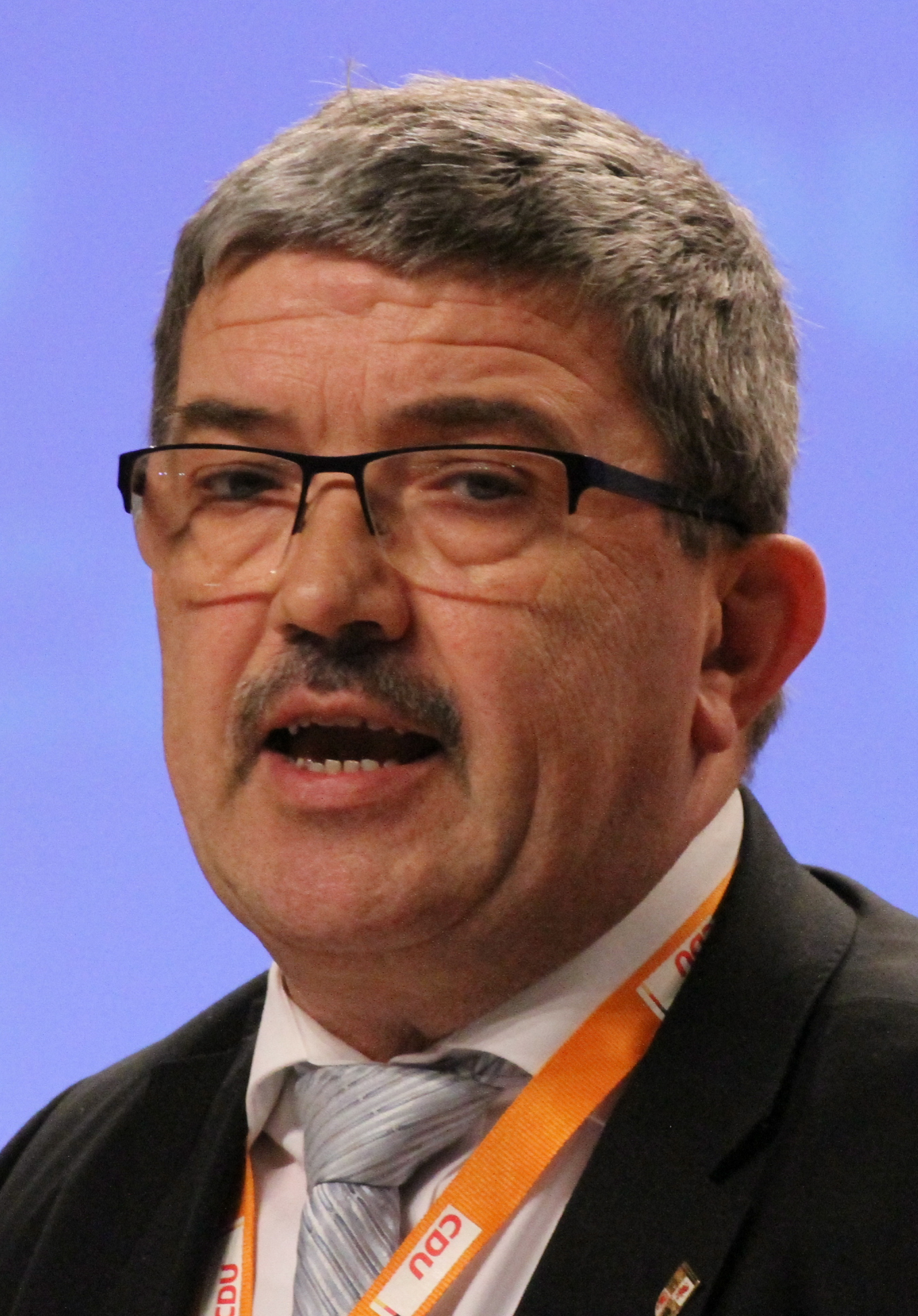

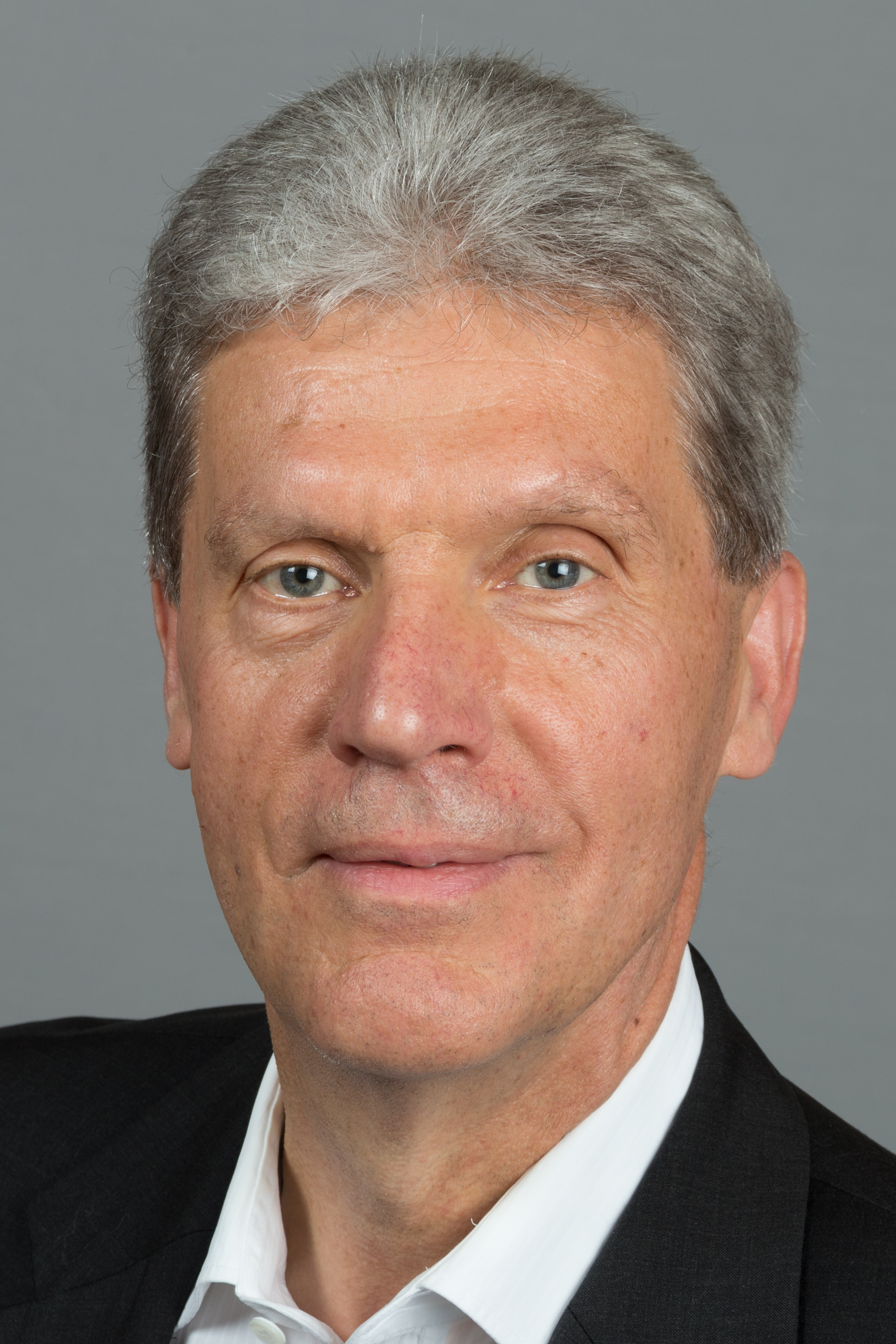
	First party	Second party
Candidate	Erwin Sellering	Leif-Erik Holm
Party	SPD	AfD
Last election	35.6%, 27 seats	Did not run
Seats won	26	18
Seat change	▼1	New party
Popular vote	246,395	167,852
Percentage	30.6%	20.8%
Swing	▼5.0pp	New party
	Third party	Fourth party
Candidate	Lorenz Caffier	Helmut Holter
Party	CDU	Left
Last election	23.0%, 18 seats	18.4%, 14 seats
Seats won	16	11
Seat change	▼2	▼3
Popular vote	153,115	106,256
Percentage	19.0%	13.2%
Swing	▼4.0pp	▼5.2pp
- Results for the single-member constituencies
Minister-President and Government before election
Erwin Sellering (SPD)
SPD–CDU
Elected Minister-President and Government
Erwin Sellering (SPD)
SPD–CDU

The 2016 Mecklenburg-Vorpommern state election was held on 4 September 2016 to elect the members of the 7th Landtag of Mecklenburg-Vorpommern. The incumbent grand coalition between the Social Democratic Party (SPD) and Christian Democratic Union (CDU) led by Minister-President Erwin Sellering retained its majority and continued in office.

== Campaign and issues ==
The governing grand coalition between the SPD and CDU was campaigning to defend its majority. Furthermore, the result of the right wing AfD party was eagerly awaited. During the campaign, its frontrunner, Leif-Erik Holm, warned of the "spread of Islam". The party hoped to be the strongest political force after the elections.

Asked for the most important issues, Forschungsgruppe Wahlen/Politbarometer pollees ranked "unemployment" on first place (38%), followed by "refugees/asylum" (25%) and "school/education" (12%). Incumbent Erwin Sellering (64%) was far more popular as a candidate for Minister President than the CDU candidate Lorenz Caffier (18%). In an infratest dimap poll, however, 34% named "refugees/migration" as the top issue, followed by "social justice" (27%) and "labor and economy" (20%).

During the final days of the state election campaign, Chancellor Angela Merkel, who has her constituency for the federal elections in Mecklenburg-Vorpommern and spoke in support of CDU candidate Caffier, she hardened her tone against immigrants and spoke in favor of deporting more of them, using the word "Rückführung" (repatriation) instead of "Abschiebung" (deportation) – though deportations are difficult to realize amid laws and international relations to the immigrants' home countries. On 1 September, Merkel for the first time admitted mistakes in her refugee policies, but only such that had been made years ago in 2004/05. According to Die Zeit, some saw a turn in her policies of Willkommenskultur and presumed "angst" in the Chancellor's office.

But in general, during the Mecklenburg-Vorpommern campaign, Merkel defended her refugee policies and the dictum "Wir schaffen das" ("We'll manage it"), saying she would have done everything again as she did the previous year. CDU candidate Caffier demanded prohibition of the burqa – even if there are hardly any women wearing a burqa in Mecklenburg-Vorpommern –, more police officers and more development of the rural areas. At the same time, SPD Minister President and frontrunner Erwin Sellering distanced himself from Merkel's refugee policies and demanded more respect for the life-time achievements of the East German people. Sellering e.g. stated: "It must not be, that our people are suffering, because the refugees are there." On 2 September, Sellering said on the nationwide ZDF channel, Merkel was responsible for the popularity of the AfD in the state: "The people who can imagine to elect the AfD, are clearly concerned about the refugee policies of the chancellor."

== Parties ==
The table below lists parties represented in the 6th Landtag of Mecklenburg-Vorpommern.

Name		Ideology	Leader(s)	2011 result	
Name		Ideology	Leader(s)	Votes (%)	Seats
SPD	Social Democratic Party of Germany; Sozialdemokratische Partei Deutschlands	Social democracy	Erwin Sellering	35.6%	27 / 71
CDU	Christian Democratic Union of Germany; Christlich Demokratische Union Deutschlands	Christian democracy	Lorenz Caffier	23.0%	18 / 71
Linke	The Left; Die Linke	Democratic socialism	Helmut Holter	18.4%	14 / 71
Grüne	Alliance 90/The Greens; Bündnis 90/Die Grünen	Green politics	Silke Gajek	8.7%	7 / 71
NPD	National Democratic Party; Nationaldemokratische Partei Deutschlands	Neo-Nazism	Udo Pastörs	6.0%	5 / 71

== Opinion polling ==
Polling firm	Fieldwork date	Sample size	SPD	CDU	Linke	Grüne	NPD	FDP	AfD	Others	Lead
2016 state election	4 Sep 2016	–	30.6	19.0	13.2	4.8	3.0	3.0	20.8	5.6	9.8
Forschungsgruppe Wahlen	31 Aug–1 Sep 2016	1,133	28	22	13	6	–	3	22	6	6
INSA	29 Aug 2016	1,031	28	20	15	6	2	2	23	4	8
Forschungsgruppe Wahlen	23–25 Aug 2016	1,020	28	22	13	6	3	–	21	7	6
Infratest dimap	23–24 Aug 2016	1,003	27	22	14	5	3	3	21	5	5
Infratest dimap	11–16 Aug 2016	1,003	26	23	16	6	3	3	19	4	3
INSA	2–9 Aug 2016	1,000	24	23	19	6	3	3	19	3	1
Infratest dimap	23–27 Jun 2016	1,002	22	25	17	7	4	3	19	3	3
Infratest dimap	21–26 Apr 2016	1,000	22	24	16	8	4	4	18	4	2
INSA	3–9 Feb 2016	1,002	22	29	16	5	4	4	16	1	7
Marktforschungsservice Dukath	6–13 Jan 2016	750	28.4	27.2	20.1	9.5	1.3	8.0	5.5	0.2	1.2
Marktforschungsservice Dukath	5–9 Jan 2015	750	34.3	30.6	17.4	9.7	1.4	1.6	4.1	0.9	2.7
Infratest dimap	2–5 May 2014	1,001	29	34	20	5	3	2	4	3	5
Marktforschungsservice Dukath	24–28 Feb 2014	800	32.7	31.8	19.4	6.2	1.1	1.7	2.3	4.9	0.9
Emnid	6–10 Sep 2013	750	31	28	19	8	5	2	–	7	3
Emnid	9–13 Aug 2013	750	32	28	20	8	5	2	–	5	4
2011 state election	4 Sep 2011	–	35.6	23.0	18.4	8.7	6.0	2.8	–	6.0	12.6

== Results ==
Final results showed the SPD with 30.6% of the vote, AfD in second with 20.8%, CDU in third with 19.0%, and Die Linke in fourth with 13.2%. These parties would all have representatives in the Landtag. The Greens, NPD and FDP, who had previously had representation, all scored below 5%, and so did not qualify for a seat in the Landtag. This left the SPD as the biggest party, but without a majority and opened the way to continuing a coalition with the CDU, or a new "Red-Red" coalition with Die Linke. The latter, however, would only have a majority of 2 seats in the Landtag, and would be commensurately less likely.

< 2011 2021 >

Summary of the 4 September 2016 Landtag of Mecklenburg-Vorpommern elections results
Party	Popular vote			Seats	
Party	Votes	%	+/–	Seats	+/–
Social Democratic Party of Germany; Sozialdemokratische Partei Deutschlands – SPD	246,395	30.6	▼5.1	26	▼1
Alternative for Germany; Alternative für Deutschland – AfD	167,852	20.8	New	18	New
Christian Democratic Union; Christlich Demokratische Union Deutschlands – CDU	153,115	19.0	▼4.1	16	▼2
The Left; Die Linke	106,256	13.2	▼5.2	11	▼3
Alliance '90/The Greens; Bündnis 90/Die Grünen	38,836	4.8	▼3.9	–	▼7
Free Democratic Party; Freie Demokratische Partei – FDP	24,521	3.0	▲0.3	–	–
National Democratic Party of Germany; Nationaldemokratische Partei Deutschlands – NPD	24,322	3.0	▼3.0	–	▼5
Animal Protection Party; Tierschutzpartei	9,674	1.2	▲1.2	–	–
Family Party; Familien-Partei Deutschlands	6,799	0.9	▼0.7	–	–
Free Horizon; Freier Horizont	6,603	0.8	▲0.8	–	–
Die PARTEI; Partei für Arbeit, Rechtstaat, Tierschutz, Elitenförderung und basisdemokratische Initiative	5,051	0.6	▲0.3	–	–
Free Voters Mecklenburg-Vorpommern; Freie Wähler	4,740	0.6	▼0.5	–	–
Pirate Party; Piratenpartei Deutschland	3,935	0.5	▼1.4	–	–
Other parties	8,320	1.1	▼1.1	–	–
Valid votes	806,419	98.2%	▲1.9		
Invalid votes	15,162	1.8%	▼1.9		
Totals and voter turnout	821,581	61.9%	▲10.4	71	0
Electorate	1,328,320	100.00	—		

== Aftermath ==
Minister President Sellering stated that he wanted to lead exploratory talks with both the CDU and The Left.

On 5 September, Chancellor Angela Merkel took part of the responsibility for the CDU result in the elections. "I am the party leader, I am the chancellor — you can't separate those in people's eyes, so I am of course responsible too" for the result, she stated at a press conference at the G20 summit in China. Again she defended her decisions regarding refugee policies, saying they were "right". She also noted that federal and refugee policies had "superimposed" "everything" during the election campaign. Merkel faced not only increasing criticism of the CSU party after the elections, also AfD leader Frauke Petry criticised Merkel: "This ignorance is exemplary," she said. "It is not just ignorance. What we see here is the continuing arrogance of power." Also critics within the CDU party commented on the result. Specialist for domestic affairs Wolfgang Bosbach called the election day a "historic date", because the AfD came in before the CDU and the CDU was only third political force in a German territorial state. He demanded an alteration of the refugee policies, but saw no alternative for Merkel as the chancellor. SPD chief Sigmar Gabriel accused Angela Merkel of "simply repeating 'we will manage it' without doing it as well." Green party chief Cem Özdemir said that the persistent dispute within the Grand Coalition in Berlin had been "grist to the mill" of the AfD. The Left chairman Bernd Riexinger criticised the CDU and SPD on the grounds that they had "embraced" the positions of the AfD during the election campaign.
