= Jens-Holger Schneider =

German politician (born 1971)

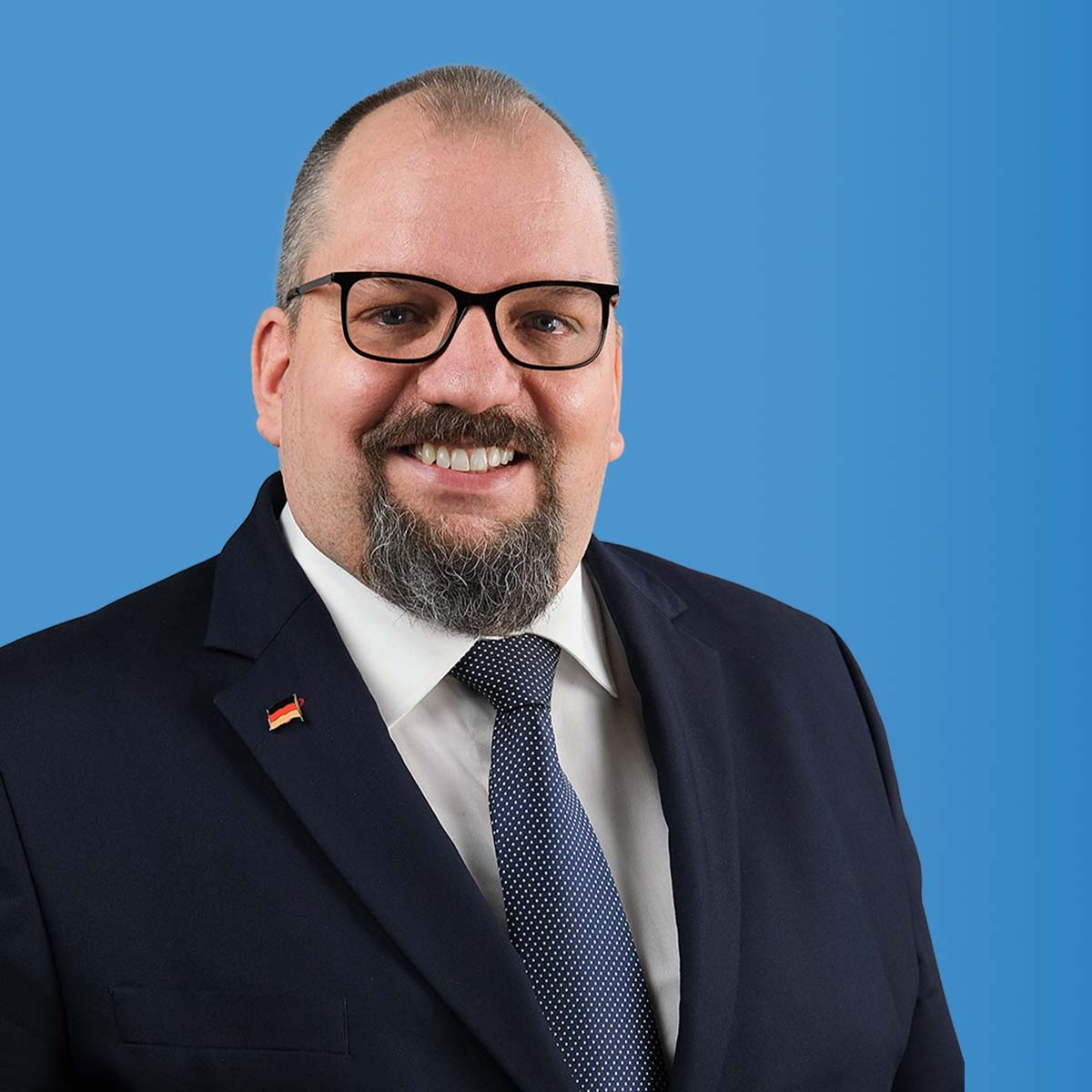
- Schneider in 2022

Member of the Landtag of Mecklenburg-Vorpommern
- Incumbent
- Assumed office 5 December 2017
- Preceded by: Enrico Komning

Personal details
- Born: 23 April 1971 (age 54) Meiningen
- Party: Alternative for Germany

Jens-Holger Schneider (born 23 April 1971 in Meiningen) is a German politician serving as a member of the Landtag of Mecklenburg-Vorpommern since 2017. He has served as group leader of the Alternative for Germany in the city council of Wismar since 2019.
