= Thomas de Jesus Fernandes =

German politician (born 1974)

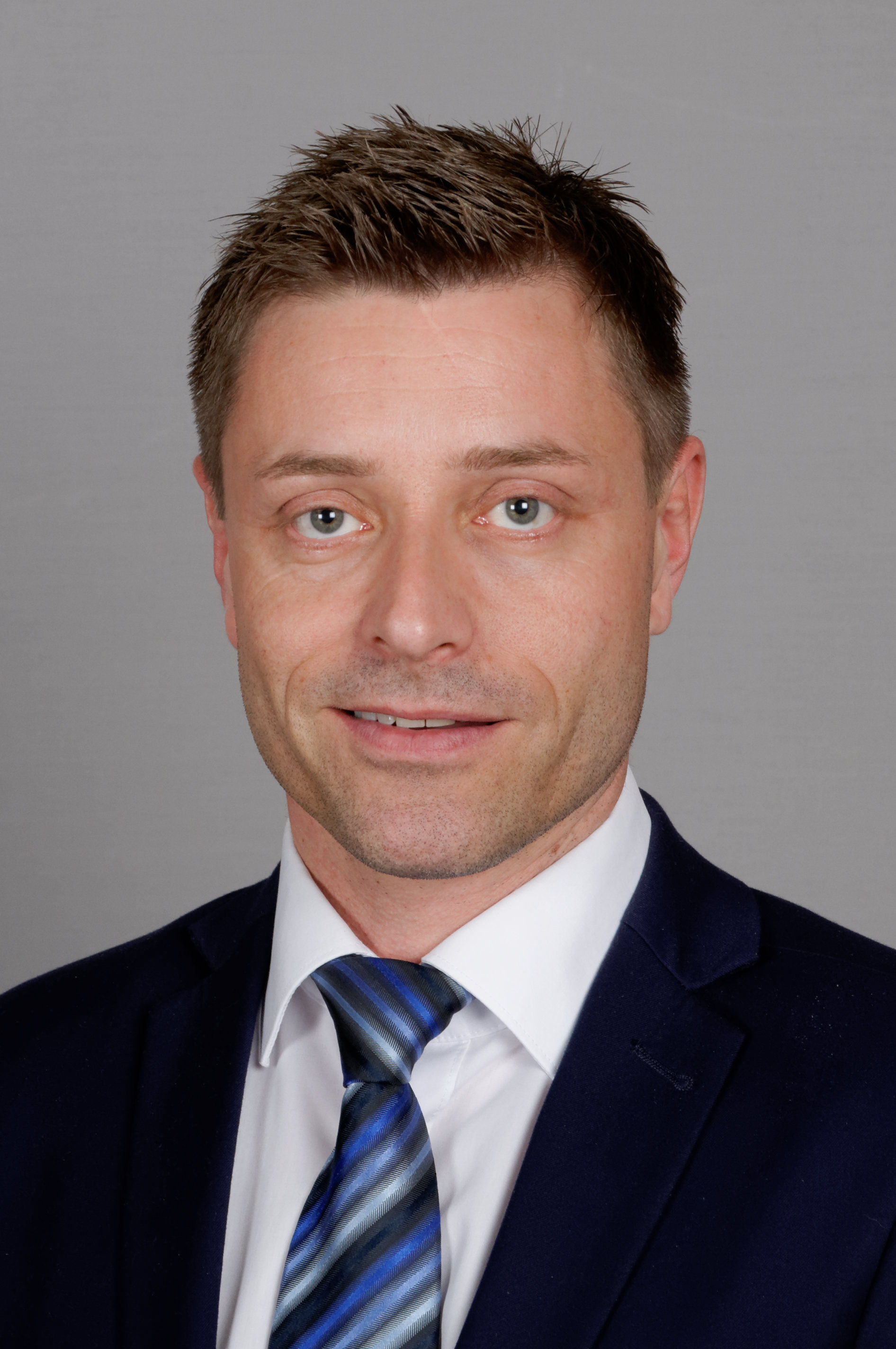
- de Jesus Fernandes in 2017

Member of the Landtag of Mecklenburg-Vorpommern
- Incumbent
- Assumed office 4 October 2016

Personal details
- Born: 22 October 1974 (age 51)
- Party: Alternative for Germany (since 2013)

Thomas de Jesus Fernandes (born 22 October 1974) is a German politician serving as a member of the Landtag of Mecklenburg-Vorpommern since 2016. From 2014 to 2017, he served as chairman of the Alternative for Germany in Schwerin.
