= Martin Schmidt (politician) =

German politician (born 1988)

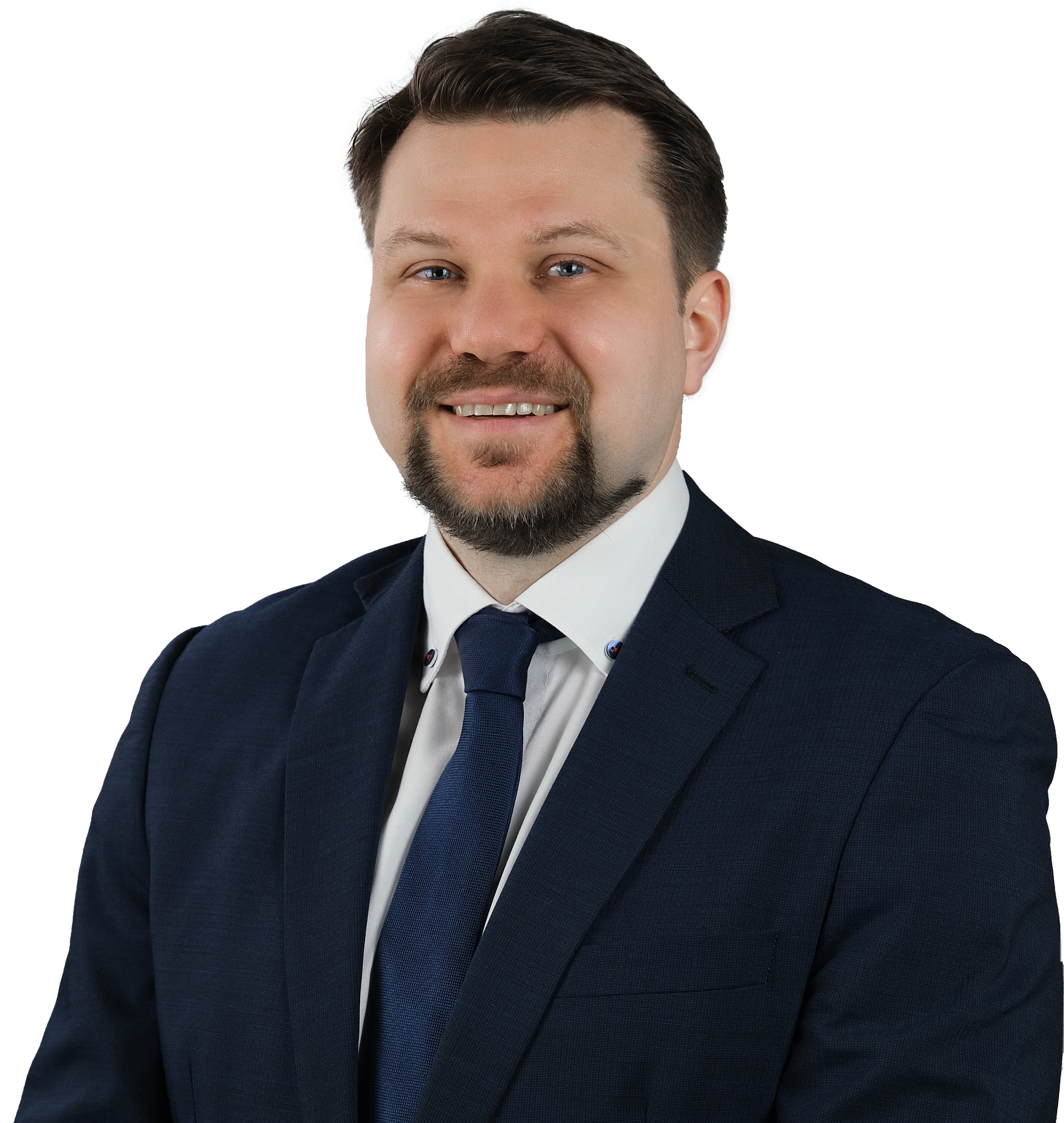
- Schmidt in 2021

Member of the Landtag of Mecklenburg-Vorpommern
- Incumbent
- Assumed office 26 October 2021

Personal details
- Born: 3 October 1988 (age 37) Berlin
- Party: Alternative for Germany (since 2013)

Martin Lenin Wladimir Schmidt (born 3 October 1988 in Berlin) is a German politician serving as a member of the Landtag of Mecklenburg-Vorpommern since 2021. From 2019 to 2021, he served as chairman of the Alternative for Germany in Schwerin.
