= Enrico Komning =

German lawyer and politician

Enrico Komning MdB
- Komning in 2020

Member of the Bundestag; from Mecklenburg-Vorpommern
- Incumbent
- Assumed office 24 October 2017
- Constituency: State list (2017–2025); Mecklenburgische Seenplatte I – Vorpommern-Greifswald II (2025–present)

Member of the; Landtag of Mecklenburg-Vorpommern
- In office 4 October 2016 – 30 November 2017
- Preceded by: Multi-member district
- Succeeded by: Jens-Holger Schneider
- Constituency: State list

Personal details
- Born: 6 August 1968 (age 58) Stralsund, East Germany
- Party: Alternative for Germany (since 2014)
- Other political affiliations: Offensive D (2000–2001); FDP (2010–2012)
- Children: 4
- Education: University of Greifswald

Enrico Komning (born 6 August 1968) is a German lawyer and politician. He is a member of Alternative for Germany (AfD). In 2017 he became a member of the Bundestag.

== Early life ==
Komning earned his Abitur in 1988 and got a degree in construction work.

== Career ==
He became part of "Wachregiment "Feliks Dzierzynski", a division of Ministerium für Staatssicherheit, the political state security service of the German Democratic Republic. In 1991 Komning studied law at Ernst-Moritz-Arndt-Universität Greifswald.

Komning entered the Bundestag in November 2017. From then to July 2019 he earned €760,000. As a member of parliament he earns about €10,000 a month; Komning was earning €36,000 a month extra at his law firm.

Komning is a member of the Greifswald-based fraternity "Rugia". "Rugia" is part of Deutsche Burschenschaft. German Bundesamt für Verfassungsschutz said in January 2019 about "Rugia", it is a "group with right-wing extremist reference".
