= Erwin Sellering =

German politician (born 1949)

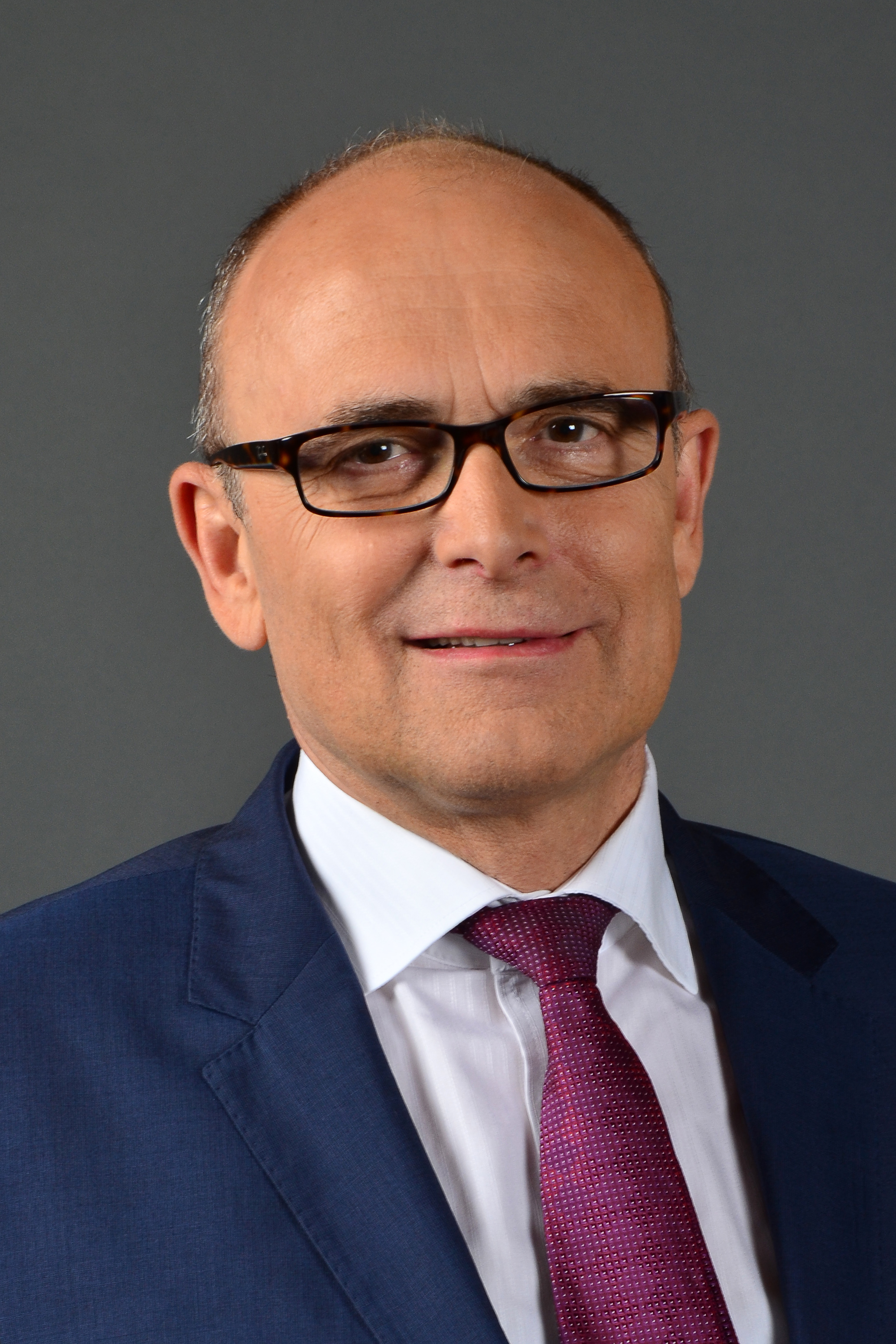
- Sellering in 2013

Minister President of Mecklenburg-Vorpommern
- In office 6 October 2008 – 4 July 2017
- President: Horst Köhler; Christian Wulff; Joachim Gauck; Frank-Walter Steinmeier
- Chancellor: Angela Merkel
- Deputy: Lorenz Caffier
- Preceded by: Harald Ringstorff
- Succeeded by: Manuela Schwesig

Leader of the Social Democratic Party in Mecklenburg-Vorpommern
- In office 14 April 2007 – 2 July 2017
- Preceded by: Till Backhaus
- Succeeded by: Manuela Schwesig

Minister of Health and Social Affairs of Mecklenburg-Vorpommern
- In office 7 November 2006 – 6 October 2008
- Minister President: Harald Ringstorff
- Preceded by: Marianne Linke
- Succeeded by: Manuela Schwesig

Minister of Justice of Mecklenburg-Vorpommern
- In office 20 September 2000 – 7 November 2006
- Minister President: Harald Ringstorff
- Preceded by: Harald Ringstorff
- Succeeded by: Uta-Maria Kuder

Personal details
- Born: 18 October 1949 (age 76) Sprockhövel, West Germany
- Party: Social Democratic Party
- Education: Heidelberg University; Ruhr University Bochum; University of Münster

Erwin Sellering (born 18 October 1949) is a German politician. He served as the 4th Minister President of Mecklenburg-Vorpommern from 2008 to 2017.

== Early life and career ==
Sellering studied law and has lived in Mecklenburg-Vorpommern since 1994, where he worked at the courts of Schwerin and Greifswald.

== Political career ==
Being a member of the Social Democratic Party of Germany, he has held various positions in the government of Mecklenburg-Vorpommern since 1998 - first as a state secretary, later as Minister for Justice, and since 2006 as Minister for Social Affairs. In 2007, he became chairman of Mecklenburg-Vorpommern's Social Democratic Party. In 2008, he succeeded Harald Ringstorff as Mecklenburg-Vorpommern's prime minister. He is also a member of the German-Russian Friendship Group set up by the German Bundesrat and the Russian Federation Council.

In the 2016 state elections, Sellering and his SPD garnered a better-than-forecast 30.6 percent. He had campaigned on local issues, urging voters to focus on jobs creation in the wind turbine sector, decentralized integration of refugees and pension parity with Germany's western regions.

Between October 2016 and May 2017, Sellering chaired the Conference of Ministers-President. He was a SPD delegate to the Federal Convention for the purpose of electing the President of Germany in 2017.

On 30 May 2017 Sellering announced his resignation from all official political positions after he had been diagnosed with lymph cancer that needed immediate treatment. He proposed as his replacement Manuela Schwesig.

== Political positions ==
Sellering is known for taking a hard line against neo-Nazis and for supporting families.

== Life after politics ==
From 2021 to 2022, Selling served as chairman of the Stiftung Klima- und Umweltschutz MV (Climate and Environment Protection Foundation), an entity set up by the government of Mecklenburg-Vorpommern in January 2021 and endowed with 20 million euros from Nord Stream 2 AG, a Switzerland-based company owned by Gazprom.

== Other activities ==
- Festspiele Mecklenburg-Vorpommern, Patron
- Deutsches Museum, Member of the Board of Trustees
- KfW, Member of the Board of Supervisory Directors (2013-2015)

== Personal life ==
Sellering is married, has two children and currently resides in Greifswald.
