= Michael Meister (politician, born 1974) =

German politician (born 1974)

Member of the Landtag of Mecklenburg-Vorpommern
- Incumbent
- Assumed office 26 October 2021

Personal details
- Born: 15 July 1974 (age 52) Rostock
- Party: Alternative for Germany

Michael Meister (born 15 July 1974) is a German politician serving as a member of the Landtag of Mecklenburg-Vorpommern since 2021. He has served as group leader of the Alternative for Germany in the city council of Ribnitz-Damgarten since 2019.
