= Stephan Reuken =

German politician (born 1985)

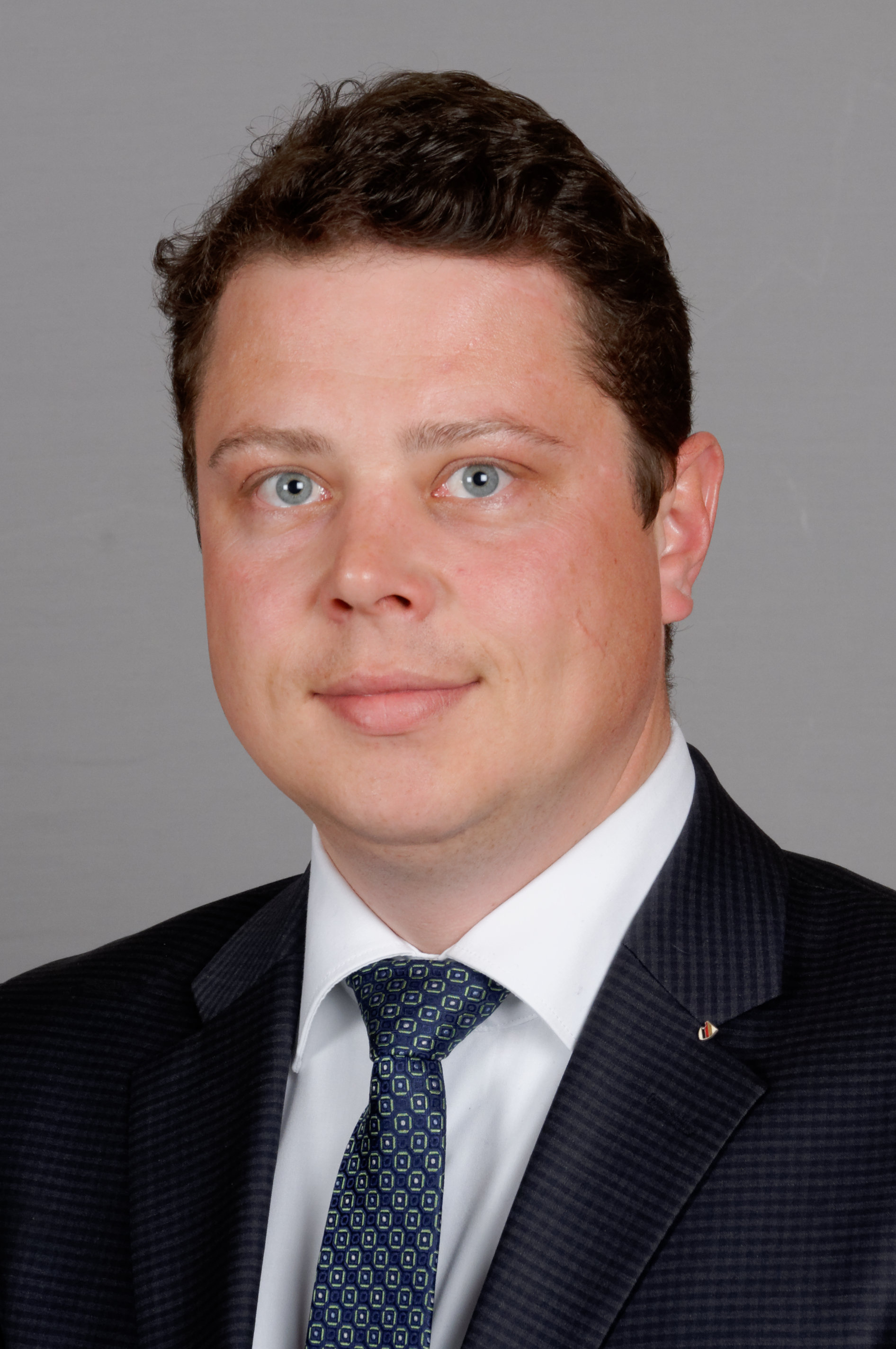
- Reuken in 2017

Member of the Landtag of Mecklenburg-Vorpommern
- Incumbent
- Assumed office 4 October 2016

Personal details
- Born: 5 July 1985 (age 40) Gütersloh
- Party: Alternative for Germany (since 2014)
- Other political affiliations: Christian Democratic Union (formerly)

Stephan J. Reuken (born 5 July 1985 in Gütersloh) is a German politician serving as a member of the Landtag of Mecklenburg-Vorpommern since 2016. He has been a member of the Alternative for Germany since 2014, and was previously a member of the Christian Democratic Union.
