= Lorenz Caffier =

German politician (born 1954)

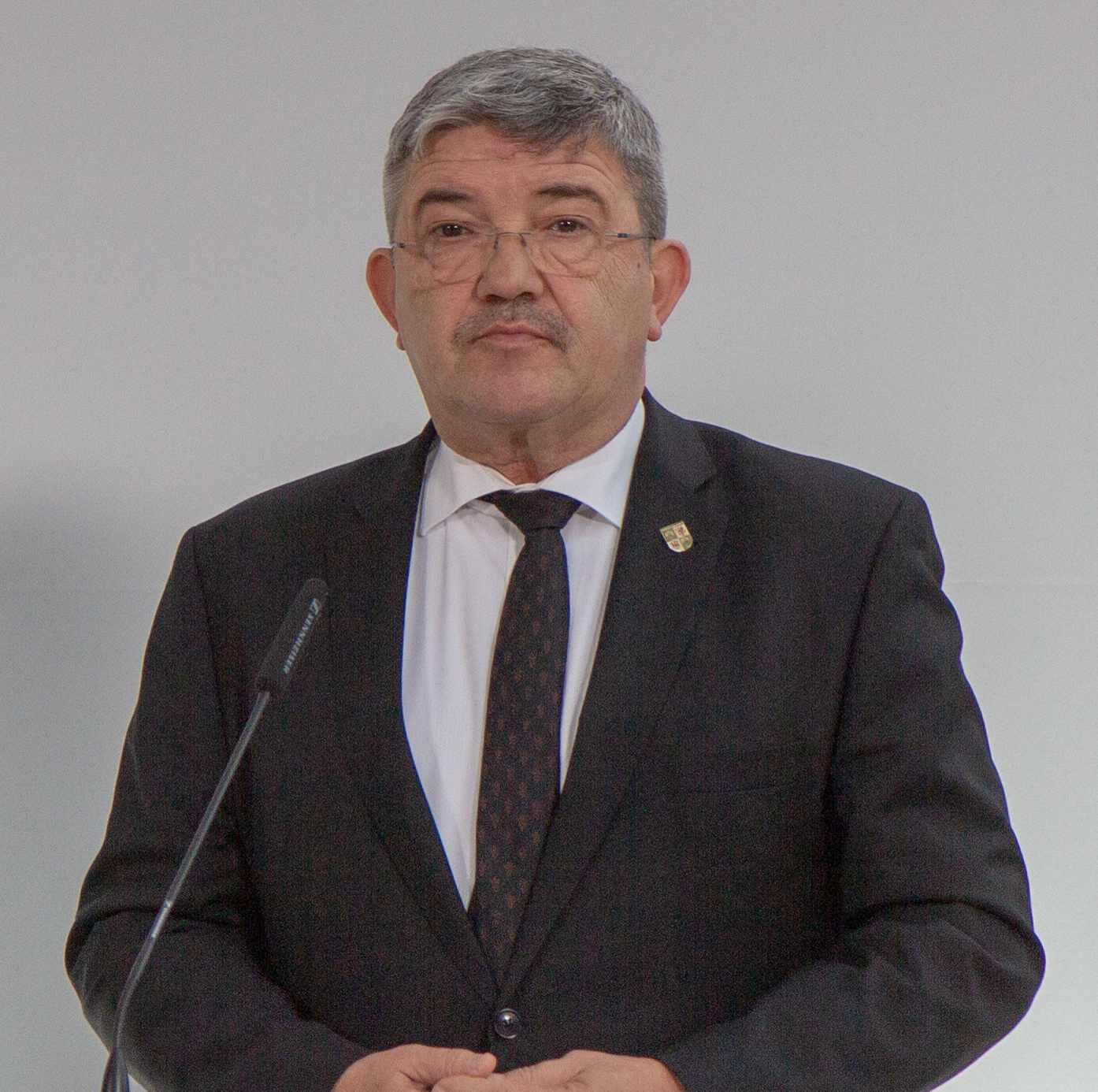
- Caffier on 30 November 2018

Deputy Minister President of Mecklenburg-Vorpommern
- In office 15 October 2011 – 17 November 2020
- Minister President: Erwin Sellering; Manuela Schwesig
- Preceded by: Jürgen Seidel

Minister of the Interior and Europe of Mecklenburg-Vorpommern
- In office 1 November 2016 – 17 November 2020
- Minister President: Erwin Sellering; Manuela Schwesig
- Preceded by: Himself (Interior and Sport)
- Succeeded by: Torsten Renz (as minister of the interior); Bettina Martin (as minister of science, culture, federal and European affairs)

Leader of the Christian Democratic Union in Mecklenburg-Vorpommern
- In office 12 November 2009 – 8 April 2017
- General Secretary: Vincent Kokert
- Preceded by: Jürgen Seidel
- Succeeded by: Vincent Kokert

Minister of the Interior and Sport of Mecklenburg-Vorpommern
- In office 15 October 2011 – 1 November 2016
- Minister President: Erwin Sellering
- Preceded by: Himself (Interior)
- Succeeded by: Himself (Interior and Europe)

Minister of the Interior of Mecklenburg-Vorpommern
- In office 7 November 2006 – 25 October 2011
- Minister President: Harald Ringstorff; Erwin Sellering
- Preceded by: Gottfried Timm
- Succeeded by: Himself (Interior and Sport)

Member of the Landtag of Mecklenburg-Vorpommern
- Incumbent
- Assumed office 26 October 1990
- Constituency: State-Wide Party List

Member of the People's Chamber of East Germany
- In office 1990–1990
- Succeeded by: None

Personal details
- Born: 24 December 1954 (age 71) Weixdorf, Bezirk Dresden, East Germany
- Party: Christian Democratic Union

Lorenz Caffier (24 December 1954 in Weixdorf, Saxony) is a German politician who served as chairman of the Christian Democratic Union in the German state of Mecklenburg-Western Pomerania.

== Political career ==
Caffier served as State Minister of the Interior (2006–2020) and as Deputy Minister-President of Mecklenburg-Western Pomerania (2011–2020) in the governments of Minister-Presidents Harald Ringstorff (2006–2008), Erwin Sellering (2008–2017) and Manuela Schwesig (2017–2020). As one of the state’s representatives at the Bundesrat, he chaired its Defence Committee from 2006. In addition, he led the Bundesrat delegation to the NATO Parliamentary Assembly from 2010 to 2020. He was also a member of the German-Russian Friendship Group set up by the Bundesrat and the Russian Federation Council.

Together with Stefan Mappus, Reiner Haseloff, Frank Henkel, Peter Hintze, Julia Klöckner, Christine Lieberknecht and Thomas Röwekamp, Caffier co-chaired the CDU’s national convention in Karlsruhe in 2010.

In the negotiations to form a Grand Coalition of the Christian Democrats (CDU together with the Bavarian CSU) and the Social Democrats (SPD) following the 2013 federal elections, Caffier was part of the CDU/CSU delegation in the working group on internal and legal affairs, led by Hans-Peter Friedrich and Thomas Oppermann. In similar negotiations to form a coalition government following the 2017 federal elections, he was again part of the working group on internal and legal affairs, this time led by Thomas de Maizière, Stephan Mayer and Heiko Maas.

Caffier was a CDU delegate to the Federal Convention for the purpose of electing the President of Germany in 2017.

In September 2020, Caffier announced that he would not stand in the 2021 Mecklenburg-Vorpommern state election but instead resign from active politics by the end of the legislative term.

On 17 November 2020 he resigned from his office as Minister of the Interior.

== Other activities ==
- 2011 FIFA Women's World Cup, Member of the Board of Trustees
- German Forum for Crime Prevention (DFK), Member of the Board of Trustees
- Achterkerke Stiftung für Kinder, Member of the Board of Trustees

== Political positions ==
In 2012, Caffier caused controversy when he proposed that football fans might have to pass through "face scanners" at stadiums, comparing visitors' biometric data to a database of known football rioters.

In 2014, Caffier joined other German interior ministers in launching a suit to ban the National Democratic Party of Germany (NPD).

In an effort to respond to growing security fears among the public during the European migrant crisis in 2016, Caffier called for a partial ban on the burqa and niqab garments, arguing that the full body veil is a barrier to integration, encourages parallel societies and suggests women are inferior.

== Personal life ==
Caffier was born on 24 December 1954 in Weixdorf (now a part of Dresden), Saxony and is the third son of a pastor and his wife. Caffier lives in Neustrelitz with his wife.
