= Vincent Kokert =

German politician

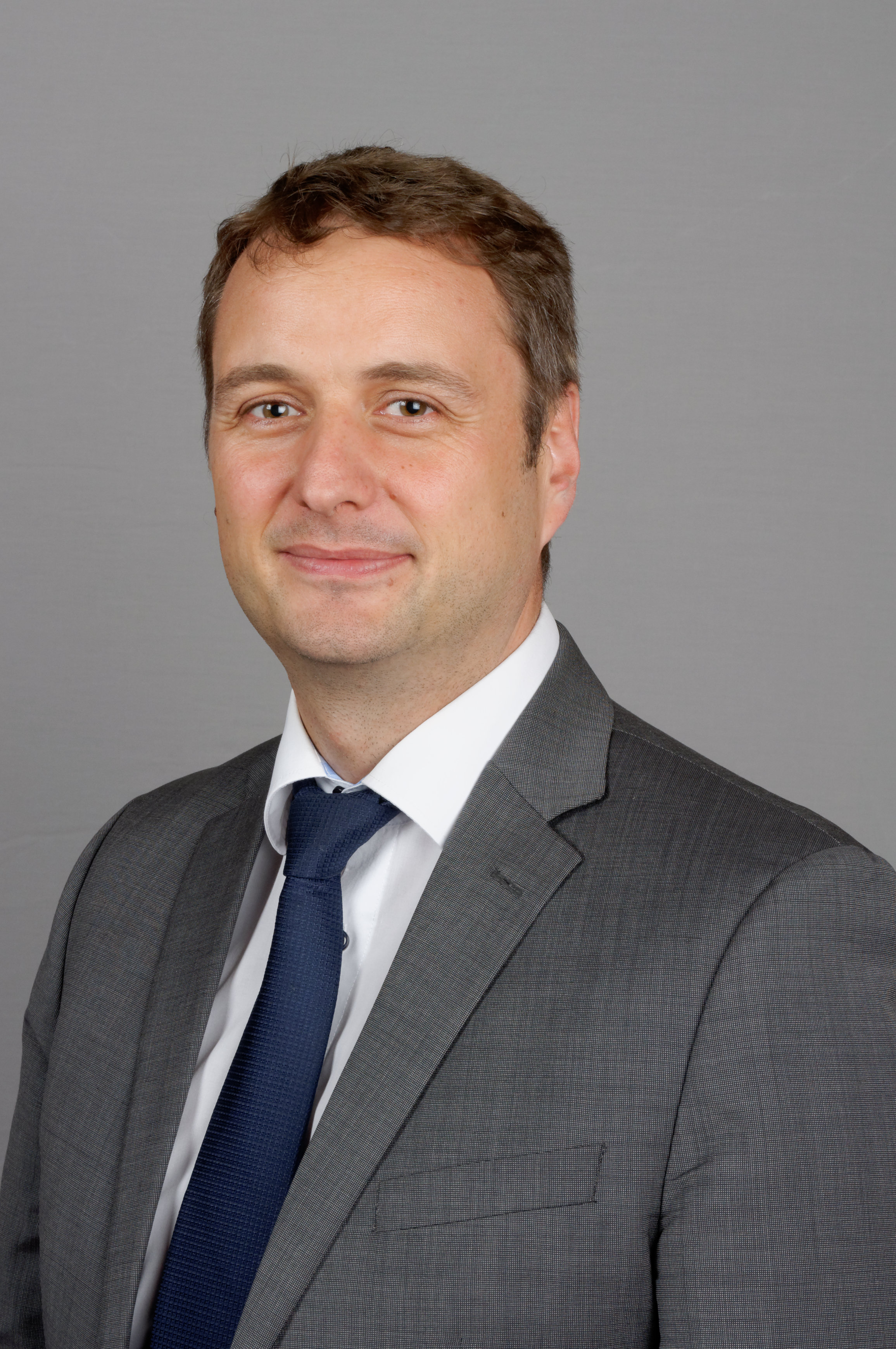
Vincent Kokert, 2017

Vincent Kokert (born 6 April 1978) is a German politician for the Christian Democratic Union (CDU).

== Career ==
Kokert was born in 1979 in Neustrelitz and became a member of the CDU in 1997. He has been a member of the Landtag of Mecklenburg-Vorpommern, the legislative body of the federal state of Mecklenburg-Vorpommern, since 2002 and became the chairman of the CDU in Mecklenburg-Vorpommern in 2017. By early 2020, Kokert announced his resignation and left politics.

== Other activities ==
- Konrad Adenauer Foundation (KAS), Member of the Board of Trustees
