= 2021 German federal election =

- 26 September 2021 (Note: A repeat election was held on 11 February 2024 for 455 precincts in Berlin. The results shown in this article reflect the legal result of the election following the repeat election.)

All 735 seats in the Bundestag, including 137 overhang and leveling seats 368 seats needed for a majority
- Opinion polls
- Registered: 61,172,771 (▼0.8%)
- Turnout: 76.4% (▲0.2 pp)
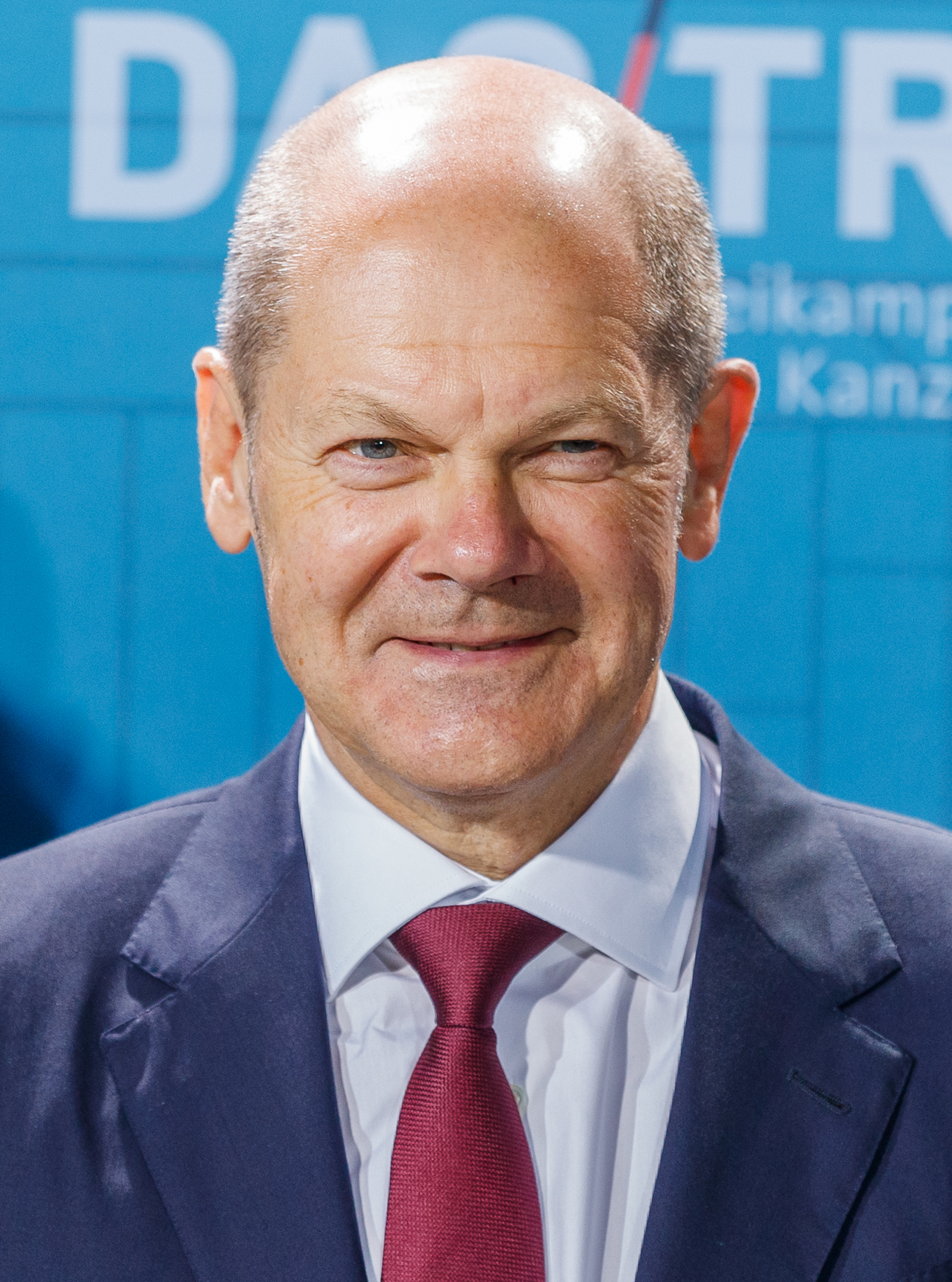

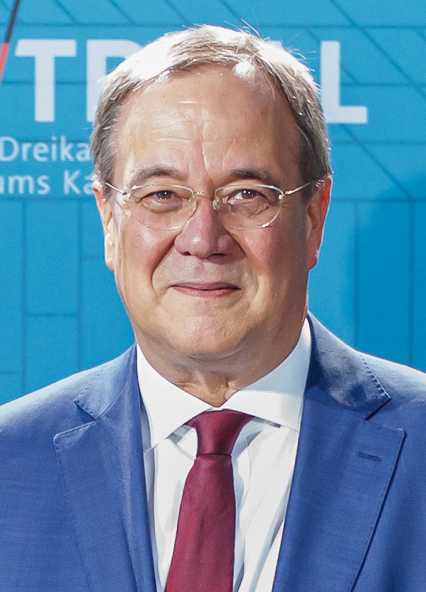

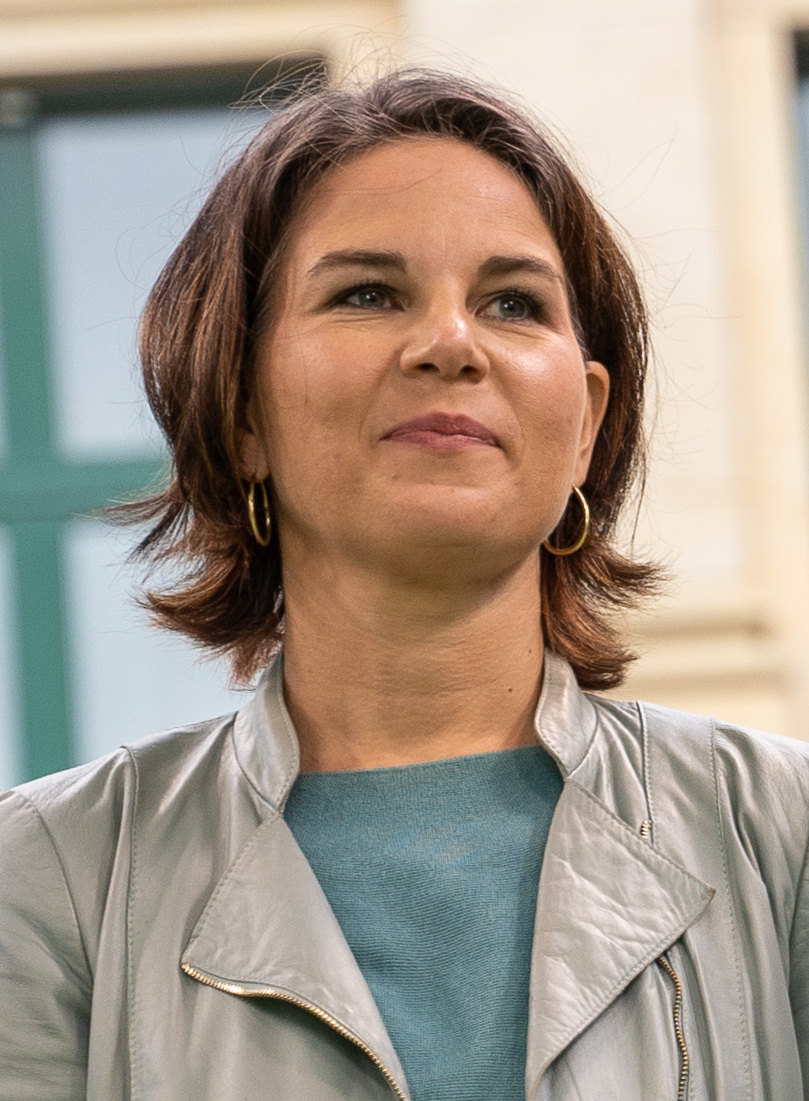

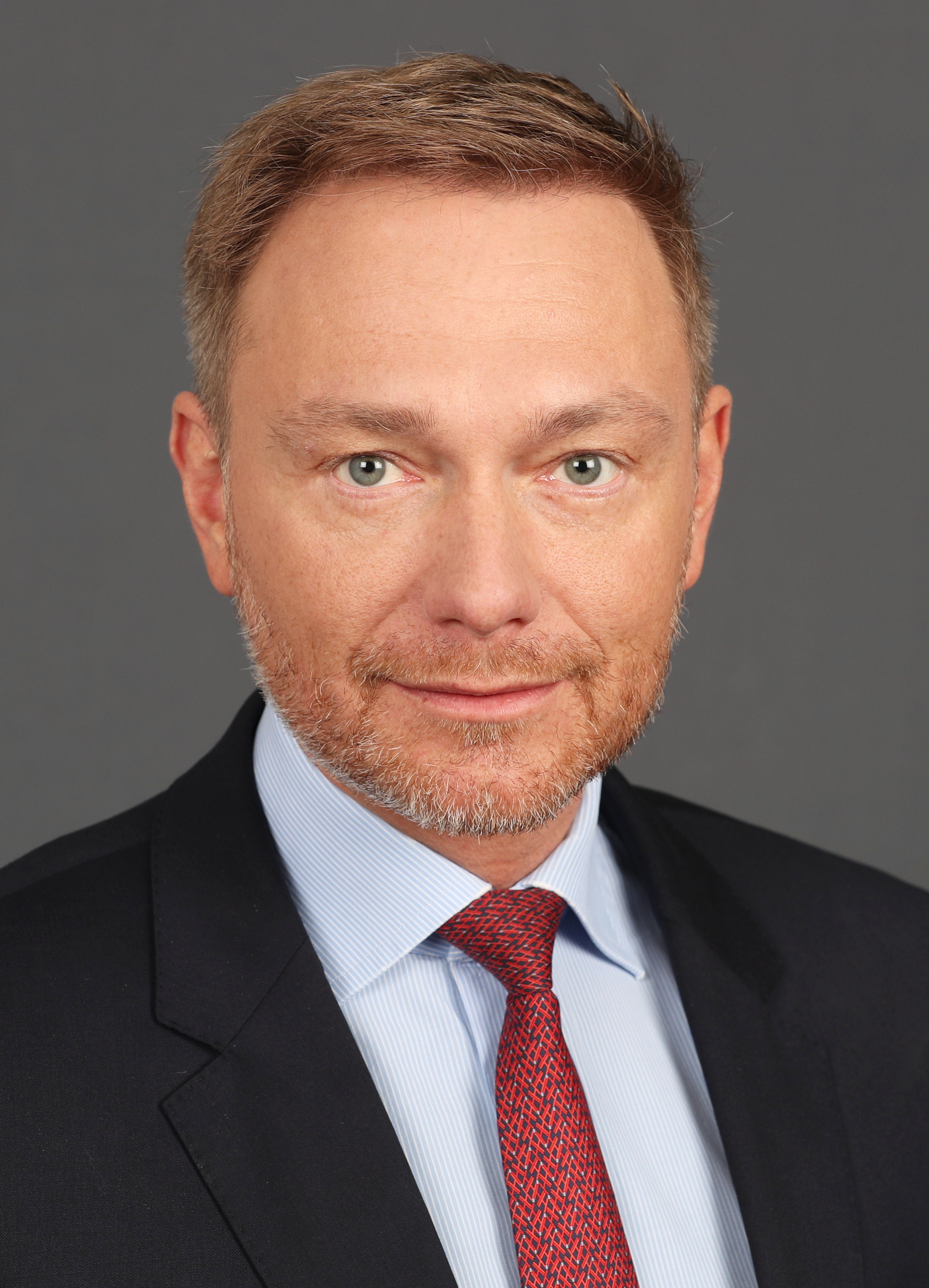

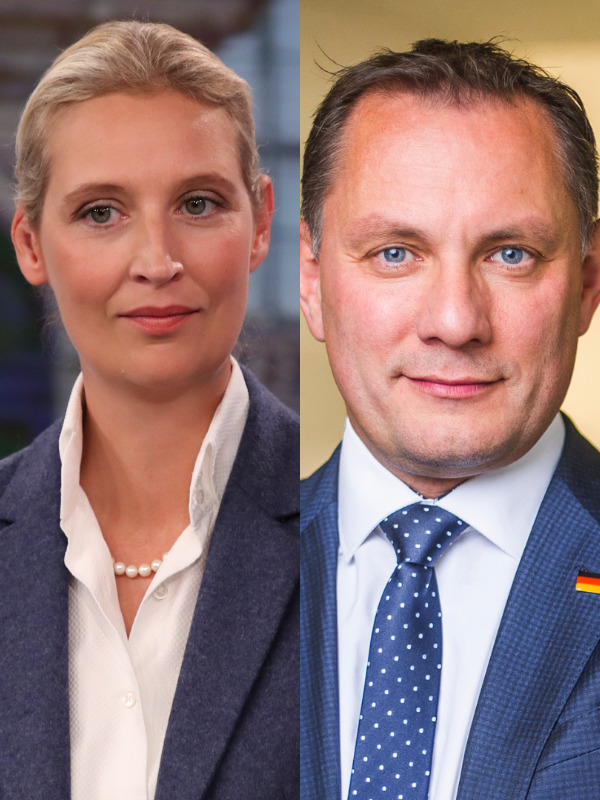

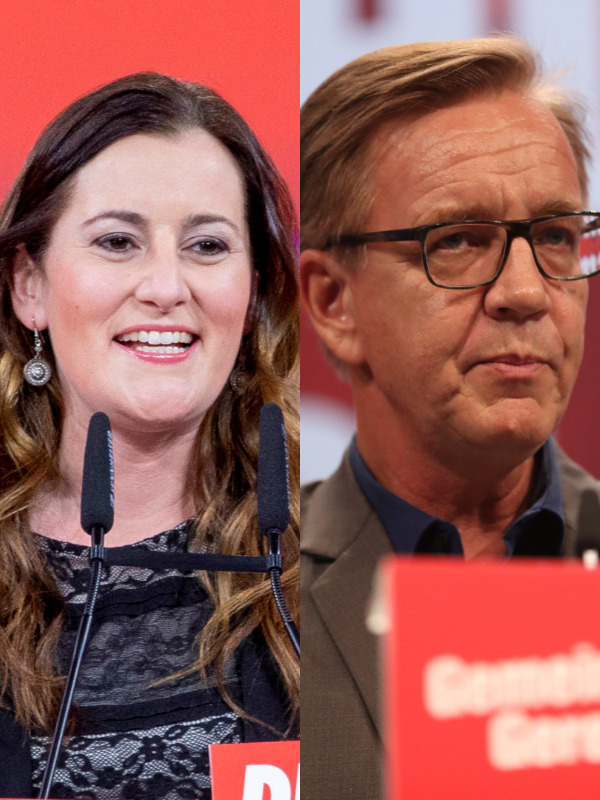

	First party	Second party	Third party
Candidate	Olaf Scholz	Armin Laschet	Annalena Baerbock (Note: Annalena Baerbock and Robert Habeck were co-lead candidates. Baerbock was candidate for Chancellor.)
Party	SPD	CDU/CSU	Greens
Last election	20.5%, 153 seats	32.9%, 246 seats	8.9%, 67 seats
Seats won	206	197	118
Seat change	▲53	▼49	▲51
Popular vote	11,901,556	11,177,746	6,814,401
Percentage	25.7%	24.1%	14.7% (Note: The Greens were disqualified from running on the Saarland state list due to irregularities in the selection of list candidates.)
Swing	▲5.2 pp	▼8.8 pp	▲5.8 pp
	Fourth party	Fifth party	Sixth party
Candidate	Christian Lindner	Alice Weidel & Tino Chrupalla	Janine Wissler & Dietmar Bartsch
Party	FDP	AfD	Left
Last election	10.7%, 80 seats	12.6%, 94 seats	9.2%, 69 seats
Seats won	91 (Note: Initially allocated 92 seats. Lost a seat during a repeat election in Berlin.)	83	39
Seat change	▲11	▼11	▼30
Popular vote	5,291,010	4,809,228	2,255,860
Percentage	11.4%	10.4%	4.9%
Swing	▲0.7 pp	▼2.2 pp	▼4.3 pp
	Seventh party
Candidate	Stefan Seidler
Party	SSW
Last election	Did not contest
Seats won	1
Seat change	▲1
Popular vote	55,578
Percentage	0.12% (Note: Minority Party exempt from 5% threshold.)
- Results of the election. The main map shows constituency winners, and results for the proportional list seats are shown in the bottom left.
Government before election
Fourth Merkel cabinet
CDU/CSU–SPD
Government after election
Scholz cabinet
SPD–Greens–FDP

A federal election was held in Germany on 26 September 2021 to elect the members of the 20th Bundestag. State elections in Berlin and Mecklenburg-Vorpommern were also held. Incumbent chancellor Angela Merkel, first elected in 2005, chose not to run again, marking the first time that an incumbent Chancellor of the Federal Republic of Germany did not seek re-election.

With 25.7% of total votes, the Social Democratic Party of Germany (SPD) recorded their best result since 2005, and emerged as the largest party for the first time since 2002. The ruling CDU/CSU, which had led a grand coalition with the SPD since 2013, recorded their worst ever result with 24.1%, a significant decline from 32.9% in 2017. Alliance 90/The Greens achieved their best result in history at 14.7%, while the Free Democratic Party (FDP) made small gains and finished on 11.4%. The Alternative for Germany (AfD) fell from third to fifth place with 10.4%, a decline of 2.3 percentage points. The Left suffered their worst showing since their official formation in 2007, failing to cross the 5% electoral threshold by just over one-tenth of a percentage point. The party was nonetheless entitled to full proportional representation, as it won three direct mandates. The South Schleswig Voters' Association (SSW) was exempt from the 5% threshold and won 1 seat, the first time it held national representation since 1949.

With a fifth grand coalition being dismissed by both the CDU/CSU and the SPD, the FDP and the Greens were considered kingmakers. On 23 November, following complex coalition talks, the SPD, FDP and Greens formalized an agreement to form a traffic light coalition, which was approved by all three parties. Olaf Scholz and his cabinet were elected by the Bundestag on 8 December.

Irregularities in Berlin led to repeat elections in February 2023 (state) and February 2024 (federal). The result of the federal repeat election meant that the FDP lost a seat in the Bundestag, while 3 other seats were moved from Berlin to different states.

== Background ==
=== 2017 federal election and government formation ===
The 2017 federal election was held after a four-year grand coalition between the CDU/CSU and the SPD. Though the CDU/CSU remained the biggest parliamentary group, both it and the SPD suffered significant losses. The SPD leadership, recognising the party's unsatisfactory performance after four years in government, announced that it would go into opposition. With the CDU/CSU having pledged not to work with either the AfD or The Left before the federal election, the only remaining option for a majority government was a Jamaica coalition consisting of the CDU/CSU, FDP, and the Greens. Exploratory talks between the parties were held over the next six weeks, though the FDP withdrew from the negotiations on 20 November, citing irreconcilable differences between the parties on migration and energy policies. Chancellor Angela Merkel consulted with President Frank-Walter Steinmeier, who implored all parties to reconsider in order to avoid fresh elections.

The SPD and their leader Martin Schulz indicated their willingness to enter into discussions for another coalition government with the CDU/CSU. The SPD leadership voted to enter into exploratory discussion on 15 December 2017 and at a party congress in January 2018 a majority of the party's delegates voted to support the coalition talks. The text of the final agreement was agreed to by the CDU/CSU and the SPD on 7 February, though was conditioned on the approval of a majority of the SPD's party membership. The 463,723 members of the SPD voted to approve or reject the deal from 20 February to 2 March, with the result announced on 4 March. A total of 78.39% of members cast valid votes, of which 66.02% voted in favor of another grand coalition. Merkel was voted in by the Bundestag for a fourth term as chancellor on 14 March, with 364 votes for, 315 against, 9 abstentions, and 4 invalid votes, just 9 more votes than the 355 needed for a majority. The new government was officially referred to as the Fourth Merkel cabinet.

=== Party leadership changes and political instability ===
Merkel's final government was subject to intense instability. The 2018 German government crisis saw the longstanding alliance between the CDU and CSU threaten to split over asylum seeker policy. Interior Minister and CSU leader Horst Seehofer threatened to undercut Merkel's authority by closing German borders for asylum seekers registered in another European Union (EU) country. The split, eventually repaired following a summit with EU countries, threatened to bring down the government. Following his party's historically low result in the 2018 Bavarian state election, Seehofer was replaced as CSU leader by new Bavarian Minister-President Markus Söder at a party conference in January 2019, while he retained his position as Interior Minister in the Fourth Merkel cabinet.

In October 2018, Merkel announced that she would resign as leader of the CDU at the party's conference in December 2018 and step down as Chancellor of Germany at the forthcoming election, following poor results at state elections for the CSU in Bavaria and for the CDU in Hesse. Merkel's allegedly preferred candidate for the party leadership, Annegret Kramp-Karrenbauer, narrowly defeated Friedrich Merz, who had been a rival of Merkel around 2002 and had left politics in 2009 criticising her decisions and leadership. Kramp-Karrenbauer struggled to unify the party's liberal and conservative factions, and in February 2020, when she failed to lead the Thuringia state CDU towards a solution of the government crisis there, she announced her intention to withdraw her interest in running as the CDU nominee for chancellor at the election and step down as party leader. A party convention to elect a new leader was scheduled for April but was repeatedly delayed due to the COVID-19 pandemic. The election was held in January 2021, with Armin Laschet, incumbent Minister-President of North Rhine-Westphalia, winning with 52.8% of delegate votes. Merz was his main opponent at 47.2%.

The other party in the coalition government, the SPD, also had leadership instability. Following their worst general election result since 1945, at the beginning of the new government the party elected Andrea Nahles as their leader in April 2018. Nahles had already been elected leader of the SPD parliamentary group after the federal election in September when the party still planned to go into opposition. She was unsuccessful in improving the party's stock with the electorate as it continued to slide in opinion polls and was for the first time in history well beaten by the centre-left party Alliance 90/The Greens at the 2019 European Parliament election. She resigned on 2 June 2019, precipitating a leadership election for the SPD. Progressive candidates Norbert Walter-Borjans and Saskia Esken defeated the more moderate candidates Olaf Scholz and Klara Geywitz, and were elected co-leaders by the party's membership. Their election raised prospects of the coalition government collapsing and early elections being called, although Reuters reported that the duo would seek to achieve agreement from the CDU/CSU on increasing public spending rather than allow the government to collapse. In August 2020, the party appointed Merkel's deputy Vice-Chancellor Scholz as its candidate for chancellor at the election, despite him having lost to Walter-Borjans and Esken in the party leadership election.

Cem Özdemir and Simone Peter stood down as co-leaders of the Greens after the failed Jamaica negotiations, and Annalena Baerbock and Robert Habeck were elected as their successors in January 2018. Dissatisfaction with the SPD and the federal government saw a rise in Greens' polling numbers throughout 2018. They scored record results in the Bavarian and Hessian state elections in October and subsequently surpassed the SPD in public opinion, settling in second behind the CDU/CSU for the next three years. The party had its best ever showings at the 2019 European Parliament election, 2020 Hamburg state election, and 2021 Baden-Württemberg state election. They briefly polled in first place during two brief periods, first after the 2019 European Parliament election and again after the nomination of chancellor candidates in April 2021.

The Left also underwent a change in leadership, with Katja Kipping and Bernd Riexinger stepping down after nine years as party co-leaders. They were succeeded by Janine Wissler and Susanne Hennig-Wellsow at a party conference held digitally on 27 February 2021. Wissler is considered a member of the party's left wing, formerly aligned with the Socialist Left faction, while Hennig-Wellsow is considered a moderate and part of the party's pragmatic wing. Both support their party's participation in federal government, particularly Hennig-Wellsow, who played a major role in the red–red–green coalition government of The Left, the SPD, and the Greens in the state of Thuringia.

== Electoral system ==
Germany uses the mixed-member proportional representation system, a system of proportional representation combined with elements of first-past-the-post voting. The Bundestag has 598 nominal members, elected for a four-year term; these seats are distributed between the sixteen German states in proportion to the states' number of eligible voters.

Each voter can cast two votes: a constituency vote (first vote) and a state party list vote (second vote). Based solely on the first votes, 299 members are elected in single-member constituencies by first-past-the-post voting. The second votes are used to produce a proportional number of seats for parties, first in the states, and then in the Bundestag. Seats are allocated using the Sainte-Laguë method. If a party wins fewer constituency seats in a state than its second votes would entitle it to, it receives additional seats from the relevant state list. Parties can file lists in every single state under certain conditions, such as a fixed number of supporting signatures. Parties can receive second votes only in those states in which they have filed a state list. If a party, by winning single-member constituencies in one state, receives more seats than it would be entitled to according to its second vote share in that state, the excess seats become known as overhang seats; to avoid negative vote weight, those overhang seats are compensated for in the other states, restoring proportionality according to second votes cast nationwide.

To qualify for proportional seat distribution, a party must receive more second votes nationwide than the electoral threshold of 5%. This requirement is waived for parties winning at least three single-member constituencies. (Note: Parties winning one or two single-member constituencies retain those single-member constituency seats but do not win any proportional seats. This happened in the 2002 German federal election, where the PDS won two single-member constituencies in the state of Berlin, while failing the electoral threshold with 4.0% of second votes received. Subsequently, the party was represented with two seats in the 15th Bundestag.) As result of this waiver, (Note: In the 1949 West German federal election, the threshold and waiver applied on a statewide level. In the 1953 West German federal election, only one single-member constituency was required for the waiver, benefiting the Centre Party and the German Party.) parties have benefited on three occasions, such as the DP in the 1957 West German federal election and the PDS in the 1994 German federal election. Parties representing recognized national minorities are exempt from the electoral threshold. As of 2021, these minorities are the Danish, Frisians, Sorbs, and Romani people.

=== Date assignment process ===
The Basic Law for the Federal Republic of Germany and the Federal Election Act provides that federal elections must be held on a Sunday or on a federal holiday (Note: In Germany, many holidays are determined on state level and therefore do not apply for all Germans. Federal holidays are New Year's Day, Good Friday, Easter Monday, Labour Day, Ascension Day, Whit Monday, German Unity Day, First Christmas Day, and Second Christmas Day (Boxing Day).) no earlier than 46 and no later than 48 months after the first sitting of the preceding session, unless a snap election is called or a state of defence is declared. Under this rule, the 2021 federal election had to take place on a Sunday between 29 August and 24 October (inclusive), as the previous 19th Bundestag had held its first sitting on 24 October 2017. The President of Germany sets the exact date for the election. On 9 December 2020, President Frank-Walter Steinmeier ordered the election to be held on 26 September 2021.

=== Observers and false claims of voter fraud ===
For the fourth time since 2009, the 2021 federal election was observed by OSCE, providing four experts from three OSCE states.

The Center for Monitoring, Analysis and Strategy (CeMAS) found that false claims of voter fraud had become commonplace on Telegram in Germany, with accusations against Dominion Voting Systems being common despite the company's technology not being used in German elections. CeMAS researcher Miro Dittrich said, "We have seen far-right actors try to claim election fraud since at least 2016, but it didn't take off. When Trump started telling the 'big lie', it became a big issue in Germany, sometimes bigger than the pandemic, because far-right groups and the AfD are carefully monitoring the success Trump is having with this narrative."

== Political parties and candidates ==
The table below lists the parliamentary groups of the 19th Bundestag.

Name			Ideology	Leading candidate(s)	Leader(s)	2017 result	
Name			Ideology	Leading candidate(s)	Leader(s)	Votes (%)	Seats
CDU/CSU	CDU	Christian Democratic Union of Germany; Christlich Demokratische Union Deutschlands	Christian democracy	Armin Laschet	Armin Laschet	26.8%	246 / 709
CDU/CSU	CSU	Christian Social Union in Bavaria; Christlich-Soziale Union in Bayern	Christian democracy	Armin Laschet	Markus Söder	6.2% (Note: CSU received 38.8% in Bavaria. It only fields candidates in Bavaria, where the CDU does not field candidates.)	246 / 709
SPD		Social Democratic Party of Germany; Sozialdemokratische Partei Deutschlands	Social democracy	Olaf Scholz	Saskia Esken; Norbert Walter-Borjans	20.5%	153 / 709
AfD		Alternative for Germany; Alternative für Deutschland	Völkisch nationalism	Alice Weidel; Tino Chrupalla	Jörg Meuthen; Tino Chrupalla	12.6%	94 / 709
FDP		Free Democratic Party; Freie Demokratische Partei	Liberalism	Christian Lindner	Christian Lindner	10.7%	80 / 709
Linke		The Left; Die Linke	Democratic socialism	Janine Wissler; Dietmar Bartsch	Janine Wissler; Susanne Hennig-Wellsow	9.2%	69 / 709
Grüne		Alliance 90/The Greens; Bündnis 90/Die Grünen	Green politics	Annalena Baerbock; Robert Habeck	Annalena Baerbock; Robert Habeck	8.9%	67 / 709

=== Lead candidates ===
After the election of Minister-President of North Rhine-Westphalia, Armin Laschet as federal CDU chairman in January 2021, he became the presumptive CDU nominee for the Union's joint chancellor candidacy. Laschet was challenged by Minister-President of Bavaria Markus Söder of the CSU, who consistently polled well among voters and had been discussed as a potential candidate since mid-2020. As the contest intensified in March/April 2021, Söder was backed by the CSU as well as some state and local CDU associations, while Laschet received the support of most of the CDU. The two men failed to come to an agreement by the given deadline of 19 April, leading the federal CDU board to hold an impromptu meeting to break the deadlock. The board voted 31 to 9 in favour of Laschet. After the vote, Söder announced his support for Laschet as chancellor candidate.

On 10 August 2020, the SPD nominated incumbent Vice Chancellor and Finance Minister Olaf Scholz as their lead candidate for the election. Scholz, who served as Mayor of Hamburg from 2011 to 2018, unsuccessfully sought the SPD leadership in the 2019 leadership election. Scholz was formally elected at a party conference on 8–9 May 2021, supported by 96% of delegates.

The AfD's lead candidates were chosen via a membership vote held from 17 to 24 May 2021. The ticket of party co-chairman Tino Chrupalla and Bundestag co-leader Alice Weidel were elected with 71% of votes; they were opposed by the ticket of former German Air Force lieutenant-general Joachim Wundrak and MdB Joana Cotar, who won 24%. 14,815 votes were cast, corresponding to a turnout of 48%.

On 21 March 2021, the FDP association in North Rhine-Westphalia elected federal chairman Christian Lindner as top candidate for the party list in that state. He was re-elected as chairman on 14 May, winning 93% of votes with no opponent. The vote also served to confirm him as lead candidate for the federal election.

The Left announced Janine Wissler and Dietmar Bartsch as their co-lead candidates on 2 May 2021. Wissler was elected federal party co-leader earlier in the year alongside Susanne Hennig-Wellsow, who chose not to seek the co-lead candidacy. Bartsch had co-chaired The Left's Bundestag group since 2015, and was previously co-lead candidate in the 2017 federal election. Wissler and Bartsch were formally selected by the party executive on 8–9 May, receiving 87% of the votes.

Due to their rise in national opinion polling since 2018, the Greens were expected to forgo the traditional dual lead-candidacy in favour of selecting a single chancellor candidate. Party co-leaders Annalena Baerbock and Robert Habeck were considered the only plausible candidates. Baerbock was announced as chancellor candidate on 19 April. Both Baerbock and Habeck were co-lead candidates for the party's election campaign.

=== Competing parties ===
A total of 47 parties and lists were approved to run in the 2021 federal election, including the seven which won seats in the 19th Bundestag. Of these, 40 ran party lists in at least one state, while 7 ran only direct candidates. In addition, 196 independent candidates ran in the various direct constituencies.

In the table below, green shading indicates that the party ran a list in the indicated state. The number in each box indicates how many direct candidates the party ran in the indicated state.

Party	State															
Party	BW	BY	BE	BB	HB	HH	HE	MV	NI	NW	RP	SL	SN	ST	SH	TH
Christian Democratic Union of Germany (CDU)	38	–	12	10	2	6	22	6	30	64	15	4	16	9	11	8
Christian Social Union in Bavaria (CSU)	–	46	–	–	–	–	–	–	–	–	–	–	–	–	–	–
Social Democratic Party of Germany (SPD)	38	46	12	10	2	6	22	6	30	64	15	4	16	9	11	8
Alternative for Germany (AfD)	38	44	12	10	2	6	22	6	27	63	15	4	16	9	11	8
Free Democratic Party (FDP)	38	46	12	10	2	6	22	6	30	64	15	4	16	9	11	8
The Left (DIE LINKE)	38	45	12	10	2	6	22	6	30	64	14	4	16	9	11	8
Alliance 90/The Greens (GRÜNE)	38	46	12	10	2	6	22	6	30	64	15	4	16	9	11	8
Free Voters (FREIE WÄHLER)	38	46	7	9	2	5	21	6	22	57	15	4	12	8	11	6
Die PARTEI	33	31	12	9	2	2	9	2	8	52	10	4	11	2	7	7
Human Environment Animal Protection Party (Tierschutzpartei)	8	6	12	1	1	–	–	3	9	3	3	–	–	1	–	–
National Democratic Party of Germany (NPD)	–	1	–	–	–	4	–	–	–	–	–	–	–	–	–	–
Pirate Party Germany (PIRATEN)	3	6	6	5	1	2	4	3	8	4	1	–	3	–	–	1
Ecological Democratic Party (ÖDP)	16	46	10	7	2	5	–	–	5	2	9	4	13	1	–	4
V-Partei^{3} – Party for Change, Vegetarians and Vegans (V-Partei^{3})	1	11	–	–	1	–	–	–	1	1	–	–	2	–	1	–
Democracy in Motion (DiB)	6	–	–	–	–	–	–	–	–	–	–	–	–	–	–	–
Bavaria Party (BP)	–	24	–	–	–	–	–	–	–	–	–	–	–	–	–	–
Animal Protection Alliance (Tierschutzallianz)	–	–	–	–	–	–	–	–	–	–	–	–	–	2	–	–
Marxist–Leninist Party of Germany (MLPD)	22	9	7	1	2	6	5	4	6	31	1	1	4	2	2	8
Party for Health Research (Gesundheitsforschung)	–	–	2	–	–	–	–	–	–	–	–	–	1	–	–	–
German Communist Party (DKP)	–	–	–	4	–	–	1	–	2	12	1	–	–	–	3	–
Human World (MENSCHLICHE WELT)	1	–	1	–	–	–	–	–	–	–	–	–	–	–	–	–
The Greys – For all Generations (Die Grauen)	–	–	1	–	–	–	–	–	–	–	–	–	–	–	–	–
Civil Rights Movement Solidarity (BüSo)	2	5	–	–	–	–	1	–	–	–	–	–	1	–	–	–
Party of Humanists (Die Humanisten)	10	3	3	1	2	–	1	–	1	1	1	–	3	–	–	–
Garden Party (Gartenpartei)	–	–	–	–	–	–	–	–	–	–	–	–	–	1	–	–
The Urbans. A HipHop Party (du.)	–	2	1	–	–	–	–	–	–	–	–	–	–	–	3	–
Socialist Equality Party, Fourth International (SGP)	–	–	–	–	–	–	–	–	–	–	–	–	–	–	–	–
Grassroots Democratic Party of Germany (dieBasis)	36	46	11	10	2	6	21	5	27	60	15	4	16	9	11	7
Alliance C – Christians for Germany (Bündnis C)	1	2	–	–	–	–	4	–	–	2	–	–	2	–	–	–
Third Way (III. Weg)	–	–	–	–	–	–	–	–	–	–	–	–	1	–	–	–
Citizens' Movement for Progress and Change (BÜRGERBEWEGUNG)	3	–	–	–	–	–	–	–	–	–	–	–	–	–	–	–
The Pinks/Alliance 21 (BÜNDNIS21)	–	–	1	–	–	–	1	–	–	–	–	–	–	–	–	–
European Party LOVE (LIEBE)	–	–	–	–	–	–	–	–	–	1	–	–	–	–	–	–
Liberal Conservative Reformers (LKR)	3	7	10	–	–	1	1	–	8	7	3	–	4	–	6	2
Party for Progress (PdF)	–	–	–	–	–	–	–	–	–	–	–	–	–	–	–	–
Lobbyists for Children (LfK)	–	–	–	–	–	–	–	–	–	–	–	–	–	–	–	–
South Schleswig Voters' Association (SSW) (Note: The South Schleswig Voters' Association is a recognised minority party representing the Danish and Frisian minorities of Southern Schleswig, and is exempt from the 5% electoral threshold in Germany.)	–	–	–	–	–	–	–	–	–	–	–	–	–	–	5	–
Team Todenhöfer – The Justice Party (Team Todenhöfer)	–	2	1	–	–	–	–	–	–	–	–	–	–	–	–	–
Independents for Citizen-oriented Democracy (UNABHÄNGIGE)	–	2	–	3	–	–	1	1	–	2	2	–	–	–	–	–
Volt Germany (Volt)	13	12	2	1	1	3	5	–	–	15	10	–	–	–	2	–
From now... Democracy by Referendum (Volksabstimmung)	–	–	–	–	–	–	–	–	–	–	2	–	–	–	–	–
Bergpartei, die "ÜberPartei" (B*)	–	–	1	–	–	–	–	–	–	–	–	–	–	–	–	–
The Others (sonstige)	–	–	1	–	–	–	–	–	–	–	–	–	–	–	–	–
Family Party of Germany (FAMILIE)	–	–	–	1	–	–	–	–	–	–	–	–	–	–	–	–
Grey Panthers (Graue Panther)	–	–	–	–	–	–	1	1	–	2	2	–	–	–	–	1
Climate List Baden-Württemberg (KlimalisteBW)	7	–	–	–	–	–	–	–	–	–	–	–	–	–	–	–
Thuringian Homeland Party (THP)	–	–	–	–	–	–	–	–	–	–	–	–	–	–	–	1
Independents and voter groups	15	26	9	18	–	2	15	2	21	31	22	1	22	7	2	3
Party	BW	BY	BE	BB	HB	HH	HE	MV	NI	NW	RP	SL	SN	ST	SH	TH
Total constituencies	38	46	12	10	2	6	22	6	30	64	15	4	16	9	11	8

=== Registration of candidates ===
In July 2021, the respective state electoral committees rejected the lists of the AfD in Bremen and the Greens in Saarland. The AfD list was rejected for formal reasons, while the Green list in Saarland was declared invalid due to a controversial nomination process, in which one third of the state delegates were excluded from the nomination convention. Both state parties filed motions against the rulings. The federal electoral committee dismissed the motion of the Saarland Greens, while the AfD list in Bremen was permitted to run in the elections. The Green Party will thus not be eligible for the proportional vote in Saarland for the first time in the party's history.

== Campaign ==
=== Major issues ===
The federal election was impacted by incumbent chancellor Angela Merkel's decision not to run again, and candidates to present themselves as the natural successor to Merkel.

The 2021 European floods, with at least 184 deaths in western parts of Germany, put the climate issue back on the agenda in July. The SPD called for "everything to be done to stop global warming," while the CDU/CSU wanted to "speed up climate protection measures". By the end of July, 56 per cent of Germans believed that the floods made it "even more important than before" to combat climate change, and 73 per cent believed the government was not doing enough in this area; only the AfD's supporters were overwhelmingly of the opposite opinion. Following those events, six people under the age of 30 began a hunger strike in front of the Reichstag building at the end of August. They demanded a sincere dialogue with the leaders of the main political parties before the elections and the establishment of a citizens' convention to decide on ambitious measures for the climate.

During the deadly 2021 floods, while visiting Erftstadt on 18 July, the CDU/CSU lead candidate Armin Laschet was caught laughing on camera and making jokes while President Frank-Walter Steinmeier was speaking. Laschet was heavily criticized, despite his apology saying: "It was stupid and shouldn't have happened and I regret it." Both the CDU/CSU and Laschet's ratings suffered heavily in opinion polls and the SPD took the lead.

=== Red–red–green coalition ===
During the campaign, Scholz rejected tax cuts for the rich as immoral, pledged to "increase taxes on the wealthy, spend on cleaner technology and expand social programs", and a minimum wage increase to 12 euros. In general, there was broad agreement among left-leaning parties on issues such as climate change, education, finance, health, and higher taxes for the rich, and The Left being more pro-European than similar left-wing parties like La France Insoumise, while issues of disagreement were foreign policy and security. Writing for The Guardian, Philip Oltermann commented: "Paradoxically, some Social Democrats see such commonalities as an obstacle rather than a boon for an effective power-sharing deal: since all three parties already call for a wealth tax, for example, it's unclear what policy Die Linke could sell its supporters as a win even if were to get its hands on the coveted labour ministry." Both the SPD and the Greens did not speak much on the subject but did not rule it out in public, although in private they were more sceptics. One SPD delegate was quoted as saying: "To prepare the ground for a robust and functioning coalition, you need to make sure that no one walks out of talks looking like a loser. That's difficult enough with two, but it becomes even more difficult when you have three partners." Oltermann posited that The Left could see entering federal government as "a final chance to reverse the party's decline, even if it means moving some of its red lines of old."

In its election manifesto, The Left called for abolishing NATO in favour of a "collective security system with Russia's involvement", to which Scholz said that this is an example of minimum criteria to govern which is not negotiable. The Left's lead candidates stated that those demands are a tribute to the party's historic anti-imperialist roots rather than reflecting ambitions to govern at the federal level and a discussion on the future of NATO is also being led by centrists such as France's Emmanuel Macron. The party struck the anti-NATO demand from its immediate policy measures and Janine Wissler responded that foreign policy was more than NATO. Gregor Gysi, a member of the left wing of the party, stated that such demands are more of a vision, are not to be implemented as soon as possible, and should not be seen as inflexible preconditions for a left-wing coalition.

As significant issues remain, attempts among willing delegates from both parties have been made over the years on how such issues could be solved in a coalition; the solution of an internal vote preceding foreign policies votes, such as foreign deployments, on a case-by-case analysis was deemed to be unworkable by many in the SPD. The Greens see foreign policy differences with The Left as big as financial and debt disagreements with the FDP. The Left joining the federal government would have broken a taboo due to being a democratic successor of East Germany's ruling party, and for its pacifist and anti-militarist stance, and could be seen as following examples in Spain and Sweden. A traffic light coalition (SPD–FDP–Greens) was seen as the more likely scenario but a R2G coalition, which would be favoured by the left-wing leadership and rank-and-file party members, was not excluded if coalition talks with FDP fail due minimum wage increase or the wealth tax.

=== Debates ===
Triell of Armin Laschet vs. Annalena Baerbock vs. Olaf Scholz

For the first time since 2002, the four major television broadcasters (public services ZDF and ARD with its regional networks, and commercial networks RTL and ProSieben/Sat.1) did not hold a joint television debate of only the major candidates from CDU/CSU and SPD. Separate debates were previously prevented by incumbent chancellor Merkel, but she did not run for a fifth term in 2021, and Armin Laschet represented CDU/CSU.

The Greens had only finished 6th in the 2017 election, but from mid-2018 to mid-2021 were ranked as 2nd in polls, even first in spring of 2021. Thus, with the traditional Two-party system of Union and SPD getting broken up and expanded to three on the federal level. For the first time, the traditional two-way duel debates became a three-way truel, dubbed "Triell". Additional four-way debates, in 2025 called Quadrell(quadrel), were held with leaders of the smaller parties that were part of the parliament.

2021 German federal election debates
Date	Broadcasters	P Present S Surrogate I Invited NI Not invited						
Date	Broadcasters	CDU/CSU	SPD	Grüne	AfD	FDP	Linke	CSU
17 May 2021	RBB Fernsehen	NI	P Scholz	P Baerbock	NI	NI	NI	NI
20 May 2021	WDR, tagesschau24	P Laschet	P Scholz	P Baerbock	NI	NI	NI	NI
26 June 2021	tagesschau24	P Laschet	P Scholz	P Baerbock	NI	NI	NI	NI
29 August 2021	RTL, n-tv	P Laschet	P Scholz	P Baerbock	NI	NI	NI	NI
30 August 2021	ZDF	S Spahn	S Giffey	S Göring-Eckardt	P Weidel	P Lindner	P Bartsch	P Dobrindt
12 September 2021	Das Erste, ZDF	P Laschet	P Scholz	P Baerbock	NI	NI	NI	NI
13 September 2021	ZDF	NI	NI	NI	P Weidel	S Kubicki	P Wissler	S Blume
13 September	Das Erste	NI	NI	NI	P Weidel	P Lindner	P Wissler	P Dobrindt
19 September 2021	ProSieben, Sat.1, Kabel eins	P Laschet	P Scholz	P Baerbock	NI	NI	NI	NI
23 September 2021	Das Erste, ZDF	P Laschet	P Scholz	P Baerbock	P Weidel	P Lindner	P Wissler	P Söder

== Members of Parliament standing down ==
=== AfD ===
- Axel Gehrke
- Wilhelm von Gottberg
- Heiko Heßenkemper
- Lothar Maier
- Roman Reusch
- Heiko Wildberg

=== CDU/CSU ===
- Norbert Barthle
- Manfred Behrens
- Sybille Benning
- Peter Bleser
- Norbert Brackmann
- Axel Fischer
- Maria Flachsbarth
- Hans-Joachim Fuchtel
- Alois Gerig
- Eberhard Gienger
- Astrid Grotelüschen
- Mark Hauptmann
- Matthias Heider
- Heribert Hirte
- Karl Holmeier
- Alois Karl
- Volker Kauder, former CDU/CSU parliamentary leader
- Andreas Lämmel
- Karl A. Lamers
- Katharina Landgraf
- Nikolas Löbel
- Thomas de Maizière, former Minister of the Interior
- Hans-Georg von der Marwitz
- Angela Merkel, incumbent Chancellor
- Hans Michelbach
- Elisabeth Motschmann
- Gerd Müller, incumbent Minister of Economic Cooperation and Development
- Michaela Noll
- Georg Nüßlein
- Martin Patzelt
- Joachim Pfeiffer
- Eckhardt Rehberg
- Lothar Riebsamen
- Anita Schäfer
- Klaus-Peter Schulze
- Uwe Schummer
- Patrick Sensburg
- Frank Steffel
- Karin Strenz
- Peter Tauber
- Arnold Vaatz
- Kees de Vries
- Peter Weiß
- Marian Wendt
- Tobias Zech

=== SPD ===
- Bela Bach
- Lothar Binding
- Ingrid Arndt-Brauer
- Fritz Felgentreu
- Ulrich Freese
- Dagmar Freitag
- Barbara Hendricks, former minister of Federal Ministry of the Environment, Nature Conservation and Nuclear Safety
- Marcus Held
- Gustav Herzog
- Gabriele Hiller-Ohm
- Thomas Jurk
- Arno Klare
- Daniela Kolbe
- Ralf Kapschack
- Christine Lambrecht, incumbent Minister for Justice and Consumer Protection
- Christian Lange
- Kirsten Lühmann
- Caren Marks
- Christoph Matschie
- Hilde Mattheis
- Markus Paschke
- Florian Pronold
- Sascha Raabe
- Ernst Dieter Rossmann
- Ulla Schmidt, former minister of Federal Ministry of Health
- Ursula Schulte
- Martin Schulz, SPD candidate for Chancellor in the 2017 federal election
- Swen Schulz
- Rainer Spiering
- Sonja Steffen
- Kerstin Tack
- Gabi Weber
- Dagmar Ziegler, incumbent Vice President of the Bundestag

=== FDP ===
- Grigorios Aggelidis
- Britta Dassler
- Hartmut Ebbing
- Ulla Ihnen
- Marcel Klinge
- Alexander Kulitz
- Roman Müller-Böhm
- Martin Neumann
- Wieland Schinnenburg
- Frank Sitta
- Hermann Otto Solms, Father of the House
- Katja Suding

=== Greens ===
- Anja Hajduk
- Sylvia Kotting-Uhl
- Monika Lazar
- Friedrich Ostendorff
- Frithjof Schmidt

=== The Left ===
- Heidrun Bluhm
- Sylvia Gabelmann
- Fabio De Masi
- Ulla Jelpke
- Sabine Leidig
- Stefan Liebich
- Michael Leutert
- Niema Movassat
- Kirsten Tackmann
- Andreas Wagner
- Hubertus Zdebel

=== Independents ===
- Frauke Petry, former leader of AfD

== Opinion polls ==
Local regression of polls conducted

== Results ==
Although the vote share of the South Schleswig Voters' Association (0.12%) was well below the 5% electoral threshold, due to its status of being representative of a recognised minority group (Danes and Frisians), an exception in federal law allowed the party to win one party-list seat.

Party	Party-list			Constituency			Total seats	+/–
Party	Votes	%	Seats	Votes	%	Seats	Total seats	+/–
Social Democratic Party	11,901,556	25.71	85	12,184,094	26.36	121	206	+53
Christian Democratic Union	8,774,919	18.95	54	10,445,923	22.60	98	152	−48
Alliance 90/The Greens	6,814,401	14.72	102	6,435,360	13.92	16	118	+51
Free Democratic Party	5,291,010	11.43	91	4,019,562	8.70	0	91	+11
Alternative for Germany	4,809,228	10.39	67	4,699,917	10.17	16	83	−11
Christian Social Union	2,402,827	5.19	0	2,788,048	6.03	45	45	−1
The Left	2,255,860	4.87	36	2,286,070	4.95	3	39	−30
Free Voters	1,125,666	2.43	0	1,332,707	2.88	0	0	0
Human Environment Animal Protection Party	673,669	1.46	0	160,863	0.35	0	0	0
Grassroots Democratic Party	630,153	1.36	0	732,620	1.59	0	0	New
Die PARTEI	460,429	0.99	0	540,165	1.17	0	0	0
Team Todenhöfer	211,860	0.46	0	5,422	0.01	0	0	New
Pirate Party Germany	169,591	0.37	0	60,550	0.13	0	0	0
Volt Germany	164,272	0.35	0	77,594	0.17	0	0	New
Ecological Democratic Party	112,131	0.24	0	152,540	0.33	0	0	0
National Democratic Party	64,360	0.14	0	1,090	0.00	0	0	0
South Schleswig Voters' Association	55,578	0.12	1	35,027	0.08	0	1	+1
Partei für Gesundheitsforschung	48,495	0.10	0	2,173	0.00	0	0	0
Party of Humanists	47,526	0.10	0	12,672	0.03	0	0	0
Alliance C – Christians for Germany	39,868	0.09	0	6,222	0.01	0	0	0
Bavaria Party	32,790	0.07	0	36,748	0.08	0	0	0
V-Partei3	31,762	0.07	0	10,644	0.02	0	0	0
Independents for Citizen-oriented Democracy	22,736	0.05	0	13,421	0.03	0	0	0
The Greys – For All Generations	17,304	0.04	0	1,958	0.00	0	0	0
Die Urbane. Eine HipHop Partei	17,737	0.04	0	1,890	0.00	0	0	0
Marxist–Leninist Party	17,819	0.04	0	22,538	0.05	0	0	0
German Communist Party	14,951	0.03	0	5,446	0.01	0	0	0
Alliance for Human Rights, Animal and Nature Protection	13,672	0.03	0	7,371	0.02	0	0	0
European Party Love	12,967	0.03	0	873	0.00	0	0	New
Liberal Conservative Reformers	11,327	0.02	0	11,003	0.02	0	0	New
Lobbyists for Children	9,189	0.02	0				0	New
Third Way	7,832	0.02	0	515	0.00	0	0	New
Garden Party	7,611	0.02	0	2,095	0.00	0	0	0
Citizens' Movement	7,491	0.02	0	1,556	0.00	0	0	New
Democracy in Motion	7,184	0.02	0	2,609	0.01	0	0	0
Menschliche Welt	3,786	0.01	0	651	0.00	0	0	0
The Pinks/Alliance 21	3,488	0.01	0	373	0.00	0	0	New
Party of Progress	3,228	0.01	0				0	New
Socialist Equality Party	1,400	0.00	0				0	0
Bürgerrechtsbewegung Solidarität	665	0.00	0	811	0.00	0	0	0
Klimaliste Baden-Württemberg				3,967	0.01	0	0	New
Family Party				1,817	0.00	0	0	0
From Now on... Democracy through Referendum				1,086	0.00	0	0	0
Grey Panthers				961	0.00	0	0	New
Thuringian Homeland Party				549	0.00	0	0	New
The Others				251	0.00	0	0	New
Bergpartei, die "ÜberPartei"				191	0.00	0	0	0
Independents and voter groups				110,875	0.24	0	0	0
**Total**	**46,298,338**	**100.00**	**436**	**46,218,818**	**100.00**	**299**	**735**	**+26**
Valid votes	46,298,338	99.12		46,218,818	98.95			
Invalid/blank votes	408,976	0.88		488,496	1.05			
Total votes	**46,707,314**	**100.00**		**46,707,314**	**100.00**			
Registered voters/turnout	61,172,771	76.35		61,172,771	76.35			
Source: Bundeswahlleiter

=== Results by state ===
Party list vote share by state
State	SPD	Union	Grüne	FDP	AfD	Linke	Others
Baden-Württemberg	21.6	**24.8**	17.2	15.3	9.6	3.3	8.2
Bavaria	18.0	**31.7**	14.1	10.5	9.0	2.8	13.9
Berlin	**22.2**	17.2	22.0	8.1	9.4	11.5	9.4
Brandenburg	**29.5**	15.3	9.0	9.3	18.1	8.5	10.3
Bremen	**31.5**	17.2	20.9	9.3	6.9	7.7	6.4
Hamburg	**29.7**	15.4	24.9	11.4	5.0	6.7	6.9
Hesse	**27.6**	22.8	15.8	12.8	8.8	4.3	7.9
Lower Saxony	**33.1**	24.2	16.1	10.5	7.4	3.3	5.4
Mecklenburg-Vorpommern	**29.1**	17.4	7.8	8.2	18.0	11.1	8.4
North Rhine-Westphalia	**29.1**	26.0	16.1	11.4	7.3	3.7	6.5
Rhineland-Palatinate	**29.4**	24.7	12.6	11.7	9.2	3.3	9.2
Saarland	**37.3**	23.6	–	11.5	10.0	7.2	10.5
Saxony	19.3	17.2	8.6	11.0	**24.6**	9.3	9.9
Saxony-Anhalt	**25.4**	21.0	6.5	9.5	19.6	9.6	8.4
Schleswig-Holstein	**28.0**	22.0	18.3	12.5	6.8	3.6	8.7
Thuringia	23.4	16.9	6.6	9.0	**24.0**	11.4	8.7

==== Constituency seats ====
State	Total seats	Seats won					
State	Total seats	SPD	CDU	CSU	Grüne	AfD	Linke
Baden-Württemberg	38	1	33		4		
Bavaria	46			45	1		
Berlin	12	4	3		3		2
Brandenburg	10	10					
Bremen	2	2					
Hamburg	6	4			2		
Hesse	22	14	7		1		
Lower Saxony	30	22	8				
Mecklenburg-Vorpommern	6	6					
North Rhine-Westphalia	64	30	30		4		
Rhineland-Palatinate	15	8	7				
Saarland	4	4					
Saxony	16	1	4			10	1
Saxony-Anhalt	9	4	3			2	
Schleswig-Holstein	11	8	2		1		
Thuringia	8	3	1			4	
Total	299	121	98	45	16	16	3

==== List seats ====
State	Total seats	Seats won						
State	Total seats	Grüne	FDP	SPD	AfD	CDU	Linke	SSW
Baden-Württemberg	64	14	16	21	10		3	
Bavaria	71	18	14	23	12		4	
Berlin	17	3	2	2	3	2	1	
Brandenburg	15	2	2		5	4	2	
Bremen	3	1	1			1		
Hamburg	10	2	2	1	1	3	1	
Hesse	28	8	7	1	5	5	3	
Lower Saxony	43	13	8	4	6	10	3	
Mecklenburg-Vorpommern	10	1	1		3	3	2	
North Rhine-Westphalia	91	24	19	19	12	12	6	
Rhineland-Palatinate	21	5	5	4	4	2	1	
Saarland	5		1		1	2	1	
Saxony	22	4	5	7		3	3	
Saxony-Anhalt	9	1	2	1	2	1	2	
Schleswig-Holstein	17	5	4		2	4	1	1
Thuringia	11	1	2	2	1	2	3	
Total	437	102	91	85	67	54	36	1

=== 10 closest constituencies ===
Incumbents are denoted in bold and followed by (I).

Constituency	State	Winner	Runner-up	Vote difference
Dresden II – Bautzen II	Saxony	Lars Rohwer, CDU	Andreas Harlaß, AfD	35
Südpfalz	Rhineland-Palatinate	Thomas Hitschler, SPD	**Thomas Gebhart (I)**, CDU	41
Steinburg – Dithmarschen Süd	Schleswig-Holstein	**Mark Helfrich (I)**, CDU	Karin Thissen, SPD	52
Emmendingen – Lahr	Baden-Württemberg	Peter Weiß, CDU	Johannes Fechner, SPD	90
Munich West/Centre	Bavaria	**Stephan Pilsinger (I)**, CSU	Dieter Janecek, Grüne	137
Mansfeld	Saxony-Anhalt	Robert Farle, AfD	**Torsten Schweiger (I)**, CDU	198
Bonn	North Rhine-Westphalia	Katrin Uhlig, Grüne	Jessica Rosenthal, SPD	216
Leipzig-Land	Saxony	Edgar Naujok, AfD	Georg-Ludwig von Breitenbuch, CDU	282
Burgenland – Saalekreis	Saxony-Anhalt	**Dieter Stier (I)**, CDU	Martin Reichardt, AfD	321
Hamburg-Eimsbüttel	Hamburg	Till Steffen, Grüne	**Niels Annen (I)**, SPD	359

=== Irregularities in Berlin leading to repeat elections ===
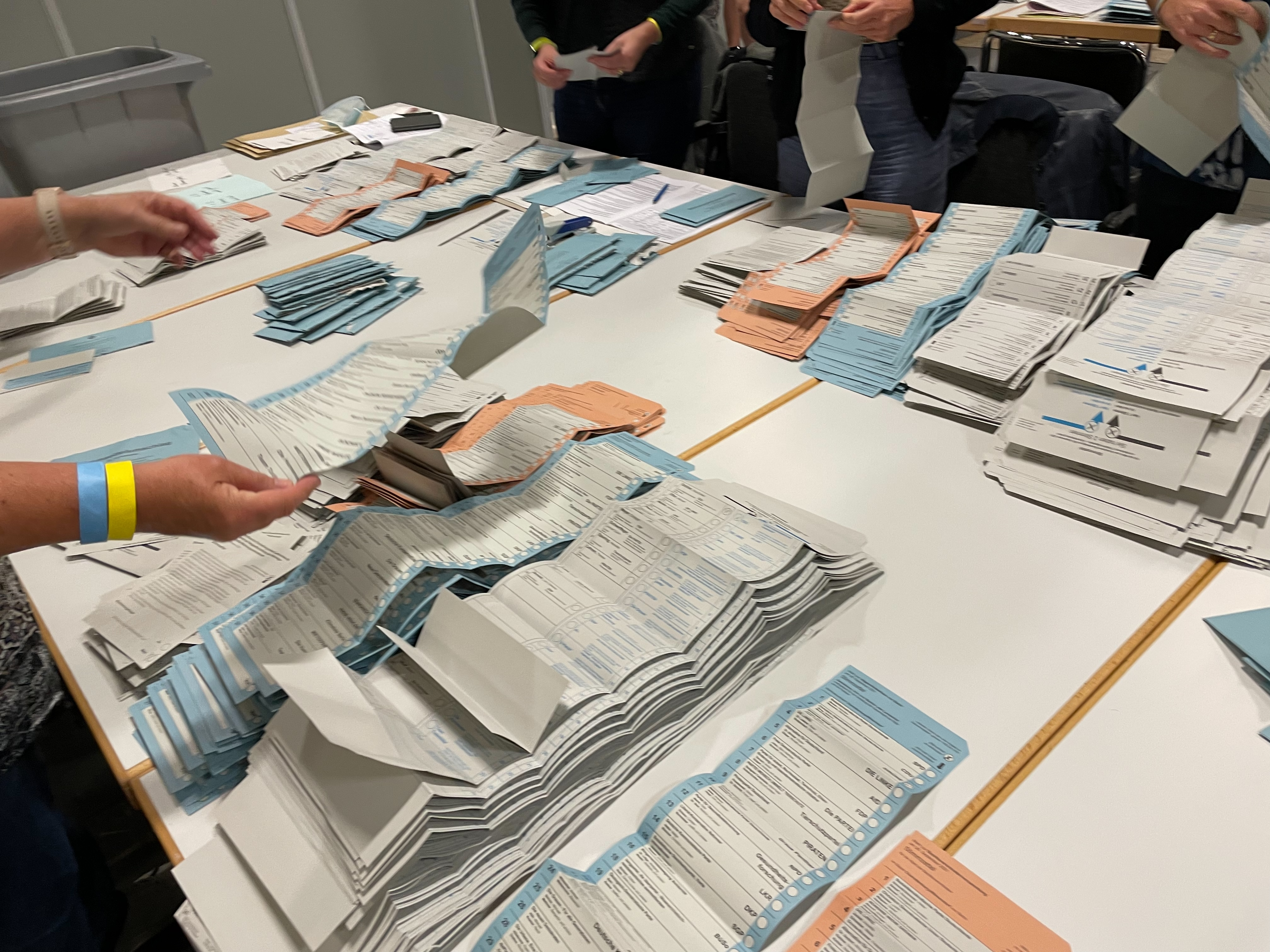
The many postal ballot papers at Berlin-Charlottenburg-Wilmersdorf

In Berlin, vote casting and counting was not simple as the federal election was on the same day as the Berlin Marathon, the 2021 Berlin state election and a local referendum. The Federal Returning Officer felt compelled to request a report from the State Returning Officer Petra Michaelis.

In some polling stations ballot papers were missing or ran out and could not be delivered on the same day due to the Berlin marathon. Ballot papers (of which there were 115 different variants in Berlin) and postal voting documents were also swapped. Many votes were cast long after the official end of voting at 6 p.m, the last after 8 p.m. when the outcome was already being forecast. At least one polling station was closed due to missing documents.

In at least 16 Berlin polling stations, basic election data did not match (including impossible voter turnouts of over 100%).

On 29 September 2021, Michaelis announced her resignation and that of her deputy.

In 2022, the 2021 Berlin state election was declared invalid, to be replaced by the February 2023 Berlin repeat state election. Decision making on the federal level took even longer. In late 2023, a repeat of the federal election was ordered in 455 of 2,256 Berlin precincts. The result of the repeat election on 11 February 2024 replaced the original result in those precincts, resulting in the overall result of the election being recalculated. As a result of the repeat election, the FDP lost a seat in Berlin, resulting in the size of the Bundestag being reduced from 736 to 735 members. The SPD, Greens, and The Left each lost a seat in Berlin, while gaining one in Lower Saxony, North Rhine-Westphalia, and Hesse respectively, thus keeping the total number of seats won by those parties unchanged.

== Analysis and aftermath ==
Party affiliation of winning candidates by constituency

Results of the party list vote by state

List seats by state

Sociology of the electorate
Demographic	SPD	Union	Grüne	FDP	AfD	Linke	Free Voters	Others
Total vote	25.7%	24.1%	14.8%	11.5%	10.3%	4.9%	2.4%	6.3%
Sex
Men	25%	24%	14%	13%	12%	5%	2%	5%
Women	27%	24%	16%	10%	8%	5%	2%	8%
Age
18–24 years old	15%	10%	23%	21%	7%	8%	3%	13%
25–34 years old	17%	14%	21%	15%	12%	7%	3%	13%
35–44 years old	20%	19%	18%	12%	15%	5%	3%	8%
45–59 years old	26%	23%	16%	12%	12%	4%	3%	4%
60–69 years old	32%	28%	12%	9%	10%	4%	2%	3%
70 or older	35%	38%	7%	8%	5%	4%	1%	2%
Socio-occupational classification
Unemployed	23%	14%	17%	8%	17%	11%	3%	7%
Blue-collar worker	26%	20%	8%	9%	21%	5%	3%	8%
White-collar worker	24%	20%	17%	13%	11%	5%	3%	7%
Self-employed	16%	26%	16%	19%	9%	5%	3%	6%
Retired	35%	34%	10%	7%	7%	4%	2%	3%
Source: Infratest dimap

=== SPD ===
For the first time since 2002, the SPD emerged as the largest party in the Bundestag. Also for the first time since 2002, the SPD swept all single-member constituency seats in the states of Brandenburg and Saarland, where they defeated cabinet ministers Peter Altmaier and Annegret Kramp-Karrenbauer. They also won all constituencies in Mecklenburg-Vorpommern for the first time, including Vorpommern-Rügen – Vorpommern-Greifswald I, the seat of outgoing chancellor Angela Merkel. It was also the first time they won any single-member constituency seats in Saxony-Anhalt and Thuringia since 2005.

The SPD had been written off by many political observers due to longtime internal quarrels and poor performances in prior elections, even those in early 2021. In the 2019 European Parliament election, they dropped to a historic low 15.8%, accelerating the decline of already deeply embattled and unpopular leader Andrea Nahles. When the unpopular and little-known SPD leaders Norbert Walter-Borjans and Saskia Esken nominated moderate Olaf Scholz, whom they had unexpectedly defeated in the 2019 leadership election, as Chancellor candidate in August 2020, they were widely mocked. The SPD sat at a distant third place in the polls and stayed there until their sudden surge late in the campaign.

However, even at their historic poll lows around 14%, Olaf Scholz had a significantly higher personal approval rating than both his party and the other Chancellor candidates Laschet and Baerbock. After the extreme personal unpopularity, resulting from gaffes and scandal, meant that first Baerbock and then Laschet floundered, the SPD took the lead, for the first time since early 2017, in the final stretches of the election campaign. This surge also meant that some "paper candidates", a lot of them young, were unexpectedly elected to the Bundestag, for example Jan Plobner, Jakob Blankenburg or Fabian Funke.

That being said, the surge and eventual outcome of the election was mainly decided by older voters, who switched from the CDU/CSU to the SPD, which some attributed to Scholz being very similar in his calm and moderate leadership style to incumbent Angela Merkel.

=== CDU/CSU ===
The CDU/CSU had their worst result ever by far, eclipsing the previous worst of 31% in 1949. Many prominent politicians were defeated in their single-member constituency seats, including ministers Altmaier, Helge Braun, Kramp-Karrenbauer, and Julia Klöckner as well as Hans-Georg Maaßen and Philipp Amthor, though all of them except Maaßen were still elected to the Bundestag via their respective state party lists. (Note: Kramp-Karrenbauer and Altmaier renounced their mandate on 8 October, meaning they will not take their seat at the start of the new Bundestag.) There was speculation that chancellor candidate Armin Laschet would lose election to the Bundestag; he was placed first on the North Rhine-Westphalia party list, and if the CDU gained overhang seats, that list would not be used. Due to the CDU's bad performance in terms of single-member constituency seats, Laschet was elected to the Bundestag. The first time since 2005 that they did not win all single-member constituency seats in Bavaria, the CSU also had their worst result in history.

Reasons given for the catastrophic defeat were corruption scandals of several CDU/CSU politicians in spring 2021, some minor allegations even being brought against Laschet himself. In addition, Laschet was suffering from extreme personal unpopularity, even in his own state. Laschet did not have the incumbency advantage that helped moderately popular Merkel to win re-election three times, but still had to run on Merkel's legacy in voters minds. This meant that the otherwise popular CDU/CSU platform of increasing digitization, reducing bureaucracy and moderate climate action were not taken seriously as his party had not addressed them in sixteen years of government in the minds of many voters. In one infamous campaign moment, Laschet spoke of a "Wind of Change" in his closing statement in the first three way debate, which was widely ridiculed. The contentious decision by the CDU establishment to have him run as CDU/CSU candidate instead of the much more popular CSU leader Markus Söder also played into this. During the belligerent internal selection process in spring, polls showed Söder faring a lot better than Laschet in the election, often higher than the 2017 result, and Söder was the preferred candidate of the base and the public at large. Even fairly late into the election campaign, 70% of CDU/CSU supporters wanted to replace Laschet with Söder. Söder publicly supported and defended Laschet, even on election night, but was accused of backstabbing Laschet's candidacy in order to become chancellor candidate in 2025.

Laschet took responsibility for the result, but initially refused to resign in hopes of becoming Chancellor through a Jamaica coalition. The ensuing talks were plagued by leaks damaging Laschet and after Söder prematurely declared the talks to be over, both Greens and FDP decided to enter coalition talks with the SPD instead. After intense pressure from his party and the public, Laschet announced on 8 October 2021 that he would step down but would moderate the next CDU leadership election. That leadership contest was the first to be decided by party members, who overwhelmingly chose conservative outsider Friedrich Merz in December 2021, after he failed in the previous two leadership elections, to Annegret Kramp-Karrenbauer in 2018 and Laschet in January 2021. This was seen as a rebuff to the party establishment, who had backed Kramp-Karrenbauer and Laschet, both seen as being more moderate, aligned in both policy positions and leadership style to Angela Merkel.

=== Greens ===
The Greens got their best result in history, nearly doubling from 2017. This was also the first federal election in which they won single-member constituency seats outside of Berlin-Friedrichshain-Kreuzberg – Prenzlauer Berg East; however, expectations for them were a lot higher, with them polling at over 20% in the summer and peaking at around 25%, having briefly overtaken the CDU in April and May. Their slump in the polls was largely attributed to a number of gaffes from and the personal unpopularity of Annalena Baerbock, though polls show that a lot of Green voters migrated to the SPD in the final weeks of the campaign to ensure the CDU would not form government.

Though she won in the party-list, Baerbock lost in Potsdam – Potsdam-Mittelmark II – Teltow-Fläming II to SPD's Olaf Scholz by a large margin. In addition, though the Greens won 16 single-member constituency seats, all of them except Flensburg – Schleswig, the constituency of future Vice Chancellor Robert Habeck, were entirely urban constituencies.

The Greens were also disqualified from running on the Saarland state list due to irregularities in the selection of list candidates. The Greens had, however, won only one seat in the Saarland in the previous two federal elections.

=== FDP ===
The FDP had their second best showing since German reunification, gaining a few seats to maintain its fourth-place position. This was enough to make it a kingmaker alongside the Greens in coalition talks.

Like the Greens, they did well with young voters; among first-time voters, they received the highest vote share of 23%. In addition, while they only marginally improved their result in the West German states, their more significant increase in support in former East Germany amounted to their best performance there in the party's history.

=== AfD ===
The AfD lost seats and went from the third largest party and Leader of the Opposition to the fifth largest party in the Bundestag; however, they performed strongly in former East Germany, where they won 16 single-member constituency seats in Saxony, Saxony-Anhalt, and Thuringia. While the AfD lost vote share in Saxony, the stronger losses of the CDU still allowed them to place ahead of the CDU, becoming the most voted party in Saxony. They also won the most party list votes in Thuringia, though only by 0.6%.

Reasons given for their drop in support include far less media attention, largely due to the open Chancellor's race, and large swaths of anti-lockdown and anti-vaccination voters, which the AfD campaigned hard on, voting for new parties like dieBasis and Free Voters. Leader of the AfD faction in the Bundestag Dr. Alice Weidel was widely ridiculed for claiming on election night that they surpassed their 2017 result if one added the results for dieBasis and Free Voters.

=== The Left ===
The Left had their worst showing since 2002, when it was the Party of Democratic Socialism, slumping from 69 seats in 2017 to just 39, or 4.9%. While they fell just short of the 5% election threshold they won three dozen extras seats as they had won three single-member constituency seats (two in their stronghold in the former East Berlin, down from four, and one in Saxony), entitling them to proportional representation in the Bundestag according to their second votes. Under a longstanding electoral law intended to benefit parties with regional appeal (as is the case with the Left in the old East Germany), any party that wins at least three constituency seats is entitled to its share of proportionally-elected seats, regardless of vote share.

Apart from this symbolic defeat, their preferred government, a left-wing red–red–green coalition, did not have a majority in the new Bundestag, and the German financial market rallied as a result. Vice President of the Bundestag Petra Pau lost her single-member constituency of Berlin-Marzahn-Hellersdorf by a large margin. The seat had been held by The Left and its predecessor parties since the 1990 federal election.

Reasons given for the massive slump were public quarrels in the party. This included feuds surrounding the position on Afghanistan, the former leader Oskar Lafontaine, who advised voting against his party in the Saarland due to alleged fraud, and popular figure Sahra Wagenknecht, who some in the party wanted to expel for her book "Die Selbstgerechten" in which she harshly criticizes, among other things, "Wokeness" within her party. These public feuds intensified after the election, for example, the convicted former head of government of East Germany Hans Modrow, who chairs The Left's "council of elders", denounced the party.

From February 2022 onwards, the Russian invasion of Ukraine put a strain on The Left. Also, due to the irregularities during the 2021 elections in Berlin, affecting state level and federal level results, both elections were under ongoing scrutiny. According to court decision in 2022, the state election was repeated as a whole by the February 2023 Berlin state election, with losses for The Left. A possible upcoming 2024 repeat of the federal election in parts of Berlin was a threat to the faction status of The Left in the Bundestag, and to 38 of 39 members, with only the direct seat gained in Saxony being not affected. With the Bündnis Sahra Wagenknecht establishing itself in October 2023 with 10 parliament members, the faction of The Left was dissolved in late 2023, losing funding and privileges by getting demoted to a group, or two in that case.

=== Ethnic minorities ===
The 2021 election was a watershed moment for candidates with a migration background. In terms of representation of ethnic minorities, one source suggested that the Bundestag would have 24 new MPs with "Balkan" ancestry. Its list included, however, largely people of Turkish ancestry who mostly have roots in Anatolia. The South Schleswig Voters' Association (SSW), a regionalist party only contesting Schleswig-Holstein representing the Danish and Frisian minorities in Southern Schleswig, won their first seat, becoming the first regionalist party to win seats since 1953. Recognized minority parties are exempt from the threshold of 5%, which is how the SSW won a seat with 0.1% of the vote nationwide. (Note: Seat are apportioned on a state level; the SSW won 3,2% of the vote in Schleswig-Holstein.) The SSW last contested in 1961 and last won a seat in 1949. They named a felt discrimination of Northern Germany as reason for them contesting the election. Stefan Seidler was seated as their Member of the German Bundestag. Seidler was offered to sit in the SPD parliamentary group as a guest by their leader Rolf Mützenich, but declined.

=== Minor parties ===
Minor parties did exceptionally well in the 2021 election. The left-wing satire party Die PARTEI had their best result ever, as did the Animal Protection Party and the regionalist Free Voters, which doubled their result and received 7.5% in Bavaria, where they take part in the state government. A few new minor parties emerged in the 2021 election, the most notable being the Anti-lockdown and Anti-vaccination dieBasis party, which received between 1 and 1.9%. Team Todenhöfer, founded in 2020 by notorious former CDU Member of the German Bundestag Jürgen Todenhöfer, also first contested the 2021 election, running on anti-militarism and receiving support from pro-Palestinian groups, but only garnered 0.5% of the vote. The 2021 election also accelerated the decline of the far-right National Democratic Party, which only got 0.1% of the vote. The NPD was at a time the most successful minor/fringe party, getting 1.6% in 2005 and entering various state parliaments in former East Germany.

== Government formation ==
A three-party governing coalition, with the FDP and the Greens joining either the SPD or CDU/CSU, was discussed as a likely outcome. While the grand coalition of the CDU/CSU and SPD could have been renewed, numerous representatives of both the CDU/CSU and the SPD ruled out this option before the federal election, during the campaign, and after. On election night, SPD leader Scholz reiterated his goal to form a government, citing the fact that his party emerged as the largest in parliament. He expressed his intention to become chancellor and his preference for a traffic light coalition with the FDP and the Greens. Leading figures in the CDU/CSU such as Michael Kretschmer stated that since the CDU/CSU was knocked down to second place, it should not form the government. The FDP and the Greens, having won 210 seats between them, announced that they would talk separately before deciding on whom to support as a senior coalition partner. The Greens and the FDP held discussions for two days after the election. On 7 October, the two parties met with the SPD for the first round of exploratory talks, with a second round on 11 October. On 15 October, the SPD agreed to more ambitious climate targets, as pledged by the Greens. On 17 October, the Greens voted to enter formal coalition talks with the SPD and FDP. The next day, the FDP voted to do the same. The 20th Bundestag was officially sworn in on 26 October.

On 16 November, the general secretaries of the three traffic light coalition parties (SPD, FDP, Greens) announced that an agreement document was almost complete, with Scholz to become Chancellor, and that the details would be issued some time in the next week. On 23 November, an agreement for a traffic light coalition was finalised. The three parties announced a number of policies, including plans to phase out coal energy by 2030, eight years ahead of the previous target, as well as lower the federal voting age to 16 years, raise the minimum wage to €12 per hour, and lower barriers to acquiring German citizenship. Annalena Baerbock will become foreign minister, while Robert Habeck will head a new "super ministry" with responsibility for climate, energy, and economy. Christian Lindner will become finance minister. The SPD convention voted 98.8% in favour of approving the agreement on 4 December, followed by the FDP with 92.4% on 5 December. The results of the Greens membership ballot were announced on 6 December, with 86% voting to approve the coalition. Scholz was elected as Chancellor by the Bundestag on 8 December, (Note: During the government formation talks, Angela Merkel headed a caretaker government after the Fourth Merkel cabinet was formally dismissed by the President of Germany on 26 October 2021; had the new government not taken office by 17 December, Merkel would have overtaken Helmut Kohl as the longest-serving chancellor since Otto von Bismarck.) with 395 votes of 707 cast, with 303 votes against.
