= The Stasi Poetry Circle =

The Stasi Poetry Circle is a 2022 non-fiction history book by German-born British journalist Philip Oltermann.

== Summary ==
The book tells the history of the Working Circle of Writing Chekists, a small creative writing group within the Stasi, the secret police of East Germany. Founded in 1960 and headed by Uwe Berger, the group consisted of Stasi agents who would compose and discuss poetry with each other, both for literary merits and to learn to analyse potential subversive messaging.

== Reception ==
Anthony Quinn of The Guardian described the book as "fascinating, strange and troubling," adding that "reading these stories of bureaucratic paranoia inclines you to wonder if the Stasi’s poetry programme wasn’t merely a willed distraction from the reality on its doorstep." Adam Kirsch of The New Statesman described the book as an "ironic tribute to communist literary ideals," adding that "the party’s fondest dream was that the masterpieces of the future would come from the neglected voices of ordinary people... yet the dictatorship of the proletariat turned out to be so invasive and paranoid that it saw any genuinely creative writing as criminal."
