= Leipzig-Land =

Federal electoral district of Germany

153 Leipzig-Land
- Electoral district for the Bundestag
- Leipzig-Land in 2025
- State: Saxony
- Population: 258,100 (2019)
- Electorate: 212,853 (2021)
- Major settlements: Grimma; Markkleeberg; Borna
- Area: 1,651.3 km^{2}

Current electoral district
- Created: 1990
- Party: AfD
- Member: Edgar Naujok
- Elected: 2021, 2025

Leipzig-Land is an electoral constituency (German: Wahlkreis) represented in the Bundestag. It elects one member via first-past-the-post voting. Under the current constituency numbering system, it is designated as constituency 153. It is located in northwestern Saxony, comprising the Landkreis Leipzig district.

Leipzig-Land was created for the inaugural 1990 federal election after German reunification. Since 2021, it has been represented by Edgar Naujok of Alternative for Germany (AfD).

== Geography ==
Leipzig-Land is located in northwestern Saxony. As of the 2021 federal election, it is coterminous with the Landkreis Leipzig district.

== History ==
Leipzig-Land was created after German reunification in 1990, then known as Leipzig-Land – Borna – Geithain. In the 2002 and 2005 elections, it was named Leipziger Land – Muldentalkreis. It acquired its current name in the 2009 election. In the 1990 through 1998 elections, it was constituency 311 in the numbering system. From 2002 through 2009, it was number 155. In the 2013 through 2021 elections, it was number 154. From the 2025 election, it has been number 153.

Originally, the constituency comprised the districts of Landkreis Leipzig, Borna, and Geithain. In the 2002 and 2005 elections, it comprised the districts of Leipziger Land and Muldentalkreis. It acquired its current borders in the 2009 election.

| Election | No. | Name | Borders |
|---|---|---|---|
| 1990 | 311 | Leipzig-Land – Borna – Geithain | Landkreis Leipzig district; Borna district; Geithain district |
| 1994 | 311 | Leipzig-Land – Borna – Geithain | Landkreis Leipzig district; Borna district; Geithain district |
| 1998 | 311 | Leipzig-Land – Borna – Geithain | Landkreis Leipzig district; Borna district; Geithain district |
| 2002 | 155 | Leipziger Land – Muldentalkreis | Leipziger Land district; Muldentalkreis district |
| 2005 | 155 | Leipziger Land – Muldentalkreis | Leipziger Land district; Muldentalkreis district |
| 2009 | 155 | Leipzig-Land | Landkreis Leipzig district |
| 2013 | 154 | Leipzig-Land | Landkreis Leipzig district |
| 2017 | 154 | Leipzig-Land | Landkreis Leipzig district |
| 2021 | 154 | Leipzig-Land | Landkreis Leipzig district |
| 2025 | 153 | Leipzig-Land | Landkreis Leipzig district |

== Members ==
The constituency was first represented by Rolf Rau of the Christian Democratic Union (CDU) from 1990 to 1998. Jürgen Wieczorek of the Social Democratic Party (SPD) won it in 1998 and served until 2005. Katharina Landgraf of the CDU was representative from 2005 to 2021. Edgar Naujok won the constituency for the Alternative for Germany (AfD) in 2021.

| Election | Member | Party | % |
|---|---|---|---|
| 1990 | Rolf Rau | CDU | 51.7 |
| 1994 | Rolf Rau | CDU | 49.6 |
| 1998 | Jürgen Wieczorek | SPD | 37.6 |
| 2002 | Jürgen Wieczorek | SPD | 39.7 |
| 2005 | Katharina Landgraf | CDU | 34.9 |
| 2009 | Katharina Landgraf | CDU | 41.7 |
| 2013 | Katharina Landgraf | CDU | 51.3 |
| 2017 | Katharina Landgraf | CDU | 34.1 |
| 2021 | Edgar Naujok | AfD | 24.6 |
| 2025 | Edgar Naujok | AfD | 38.2 |

== Election results ==
=== 2025 election ===
Federal election (2025): Leipzig-Land
| Notes: | Blue background denotes the winner of the electorate vote. Pink background denotes a candidate elected from their party list. Yellow background denotes an electorate win by a list member, or other incumbent. A ✓ or ✗ denotes status of any incumbent, win or lose respectively. | | | | | | |
| Party | Candidate | Votes | % | ±% | Party votes | % | ±% |
|---|---|---|---|---|---|---|---|
| AfD | ✓ Edgar Naujok | 65,284 | 38.2 | ▲13.6 | 65,839 | 38.5 | ▲14.5 |
| CDU | Jörg Heuter | 42,038 | 24.6 | ▲0.2 | 38,097 | 22.3 | ▲1.9 |
| SPD | Franziska Mascheck | 18,681 | 10.9 | ▼9.0 | 15,100 | 8.8 | ▼12.4 |
| Left | Jens Kretzschmar | 14,925 | 8.7 | ▲0.8 | 14,985 | 8.8 | ▲1.1 |
| BSW | Hendrik Rudolph | 10,898 | 6.4 | New | 14,696 | 8.6 | New |
| FW | Michael Voigt | 8,205 | 4.8 | ▲1.0 | 4,369 | 2.6 | ▲0.1 |
| Greens | Tom Pfandt | 6,048 | 3.5 | ▼1.5 | 7,869 | 4.6 | ▼1.2 |
| FDP | Stephan Mielsch | 4,392 | 2.6 | ▼7.2 | 5,850 | 3.4 | ▼8.0 |
| Tierschutzpartei | | | | | 1,970 | 1.2 | ▼0.8 |
| Volt | | | | | 825 | 0.5 | ▲0.2 |
| PARTEI | | | | | 714 | 0.4 | ▼0.7 |
| BD | | | | | 307 | 0.2 | New |
| Pirates | | | | | 219 | 0.1 | ▼0.2 |
| Humanists | Mariano Dechow | 487 | 0.3 | New | 205 | 0.1 | 0.0 |
| MLPD | | | | | 72 | <0.1 | 0.0 |
| Informal votes | | 1,237 | | | 1,078 | | |
| Total valid votes | | 170,958 | | | 171,117 | | |
| Turnout | | 172,195 | 81.6 | ▲5.4 | | | |
| AfD hold | Majority | 23,246 | 13.6 | ▲13.4 | | | |

=== 2021 election ===
Federal election (2021): Leipzig-Land
| Notes: | Blue background denotes the winner of the electorate vote. Pink background denotes a candidate elected from their party list. Yellow background denotes an electorate win by a list member, or other incumbent. A ✓ or ✗ denotes status of any incumbent, win or lose respectively. | | | | | | |
| Party | Candidate | Votes | % | ±% | Party votes | % | ±% |
|---|---|---|---|---|---|---|---|
| AfD | Edgar Naujok | 39,348 | 24.6 | ▼4.1 | 38,458 | 24.0 | ▼2.9 |
| CDU | Georg‑Ludwig von Breitenbuch | 39,066 | 24.4 | ▼9.7 | 32,711 | 20.4 | ▼9.7 |
| SPD | Franziska Mascheck | 31,989 | 20.0 | ▲8.5 | 34,104 | 21.3 | ▲9.9 |
| FDP | Olaf Winne | 15,698 | 9.8 | ▲3.5 | 18,322 | 11.4 | ▲3.4 |
| Left | Julia Schramm | 12,672 | 7.9 | ▼7.7 | 12,362 | 7.7 | ▼7.0 |
| Greens | Matthias Vialon | 8,056 | 5.0 | ▲1.1 | 9,381 | 5.8 | ▲2.6 |
| FW | Denise Wendt | 6,081 | 3.8 | | 3,973 | 2.5 | ▲1.5 |
| Tierschutzpartei | | | | | 3,099 | 1.9 | ▲0.5 |
| PARTEI | Sabine Küchler | 3,187 | 2.0 | | 1,743 | 1.1 | ▲0.2 |
| dieBasis | Christian Toloczyki | 3,145 | 2.0 | | 2,403 | 1.5 | |
| Gesundheitsforschung | | | | | 897 | 0.6 | |
| Independent | Daniel Zimmet | 519 | 0.3 | | | | |
| Pirates | | | | | 496 | 0.3 | 0.0 |
| NPD | | | | | 461 | 0.3 | ▼0.8 |
| Volt | | | | | 379 | 0.2 | |
| Team Todenhöfer | | | | | 373 | 0.2 | |
| The III. Path | | | | | 328 | 0.2 | |
| ÖDP | Harald Vauk | 480 | 0.3 | | 278 | 0.2 | 0.0 |
| Bündnis C | | | | | 186 | 0.1 | |
| Humanists | | | | | 175 | 0.1 | |
| V-Partei3 | | | | | 116 | 0.1 | ▼0.1 |
| DKP | | | | | 115 | 0.1 | |
| MLPD | | | | | 87 | 0.1 | ▼0.1 |
| Informal votes | | 2,042 | | | 1,836 | | |
| Total valid votes | | 160,241 | | | 160,447 | | |
| Turnout | | 162,283 | 76.2 | ▲1.4 | | | |
| AfD gain from CDU | Majority | 282 | 0.2 | | | | |

=== 2017 election ===
Federal election (2017): Leipzig-Land
| Notes: | Blue background denotes the winner of the electorate vote. Pink background denotes a candidate elected from their party list. Yellow background denotes an electorate win by a list member, or other incumbent. A ✓ or ✗ denotes status of any incumbent, win or lose respectively. | | | | | | |
| Party | Candidate | Votes | % | ±% | Party votes | % | ±% |
|---|---|---|---|---|---|---|---|
| CDU | ✓ Katharina Landgraf | 54,152 | 34.1 | ▼17.2 | 47,944 | 30.1 | ▼15.7 |
| AfD | Lars Herrmann | 45,563 | 28.7 | | 42,823 | 26.9 | ▲20.5 |
| Left | Axel Troost | 24,801 | 15.6 | ▼5.8 | 23,368 | 14.7 | ▼5.3 |
| SPD | Markus Bergforth | 18,221 | 11.5 | ▼4.4 | 18,139 | 11.4 | ▼3.8 |
| FDP | Katja Tavernaro | 10,048 | 6.3 | ▲4.4 | 12,859 | 8.1 | ▲5.2 |
| Greens | Gerd Lippold | 6,219 | 3.9 | ▲0.6 | 5,157 | 3.2 | 0.0 |
| Tierschutzpartei | | | | | 2,298 | 1.4 | |
| NPD | | | | | 1,793 | 1.1 | ▼1.9 |
| FW | | | | | 1,580 | 1.0 | 0.0 |
| PARTEI | | | | | 1,366 | 0.9 | |
| BGE | | | | | 510 | 0.3 | |
| Pirates | | | | | 505 | 0.3 | ▼1.6 |
| DiB | | | | | 297 | 0.2 | |
| ÖDP | | | | | 251 | 0.2 | |
| V-Partei³ | | | | | 233 | 0.1 | |
| MLPD | | | | | 168 | 0.1 | 0.0 |
| BüSo | | | | | 100 | 0.1 | ▼0.1 |
| Informal votes | | 2,317 | | | 1,930 | | |
| Total valid votes | | 159,004 | | | 159,391 | | |
| Turnout | | 161,321 | 74.8 | ▲6.1 | | | |
| CDU hold | Majority | 8,589 | 5.4 | ▼24.5 | | | |

=== 2013 election ===
Federal election (2013): Leipzig-Land
| Notes: | Blue background denotes the winner of the electorate vote. Pink background denotes a candidate elected from their party list. Yellow background denotes an electorate win by a list member, or other incumbent. A ✓ or ✗ denotes status of any incumbent, win or lose respectively. | | | | | | |
| Party | Candidate | Votes | % | ±% | Party votes | % | ±% |
|---|---|---|---|---|---|---|---|
| CDU | ✓ Katharina Landgraf | 76,273 | 51.3 | ▲9.6 | 68,348 | 45.8 | ▲9.1 |
| Left | Axel Troost | 31,865 | 21.4 | ▼1.2 | 29,716 | 19.9 | ▼3.9 |
| SPD | Harald Redepenning | 23,542 | 15.8 | ▼0.2 | 22,681 | 15.2 | ▼0.8 |
| AfD | | | | | 9,562 | 6.4 | |
| NPD | Maik Scheffler | 6,066 | 4.1 | 0.0 | 4,513 | 3.0 | ▼0.9 |
| Greens | Tommy Penk | 4,905 | 3.3 | ▼1.3 | 4,899 | 3.3 | ▼1.9 |
| Pirates | Andreas Vogt | 3,199 | 2.2 | | 2,905 | 1.9 | |
| FDP | Steve Görnitz | 2,890 | 1.9 | ▼8.2 | 4,292 | 2.9 | ▼10.3 |
| FW | | | | | 1,485 | 1.0 | |
| PRO | | | | | 495 | 0.3 | |
| BüSo | | | | | 172 | 0.1 | ▼0.6 |
| MLPD | | | | | 137 | 0.1 | ▼0.2 |
| Informal votes | | 2,797 | | | 2,332 | | |
| Total valid votes | | 148,740 | | | 149,205 | | |
| Turnout | | 131,537 | 68.8 | ▲4.5 | | | |
| CDU hold | Majority | 44,408 | 29.9 | ▲10.8 | | | |

=== 2009 election ===
Federal election (2009): Leipzig-Land
| Notes: | Blue background denotes the winner of the electorate vote. Pink background denotes a candidate elected from their party list. Yellow background denotes an electorate win by a list member, or other incumbent. A ✓ or ✗ denotes status of any incumbent, win or lose respectively. | | | | | | |
| Party | Candidate | Votes | % | ±% | Party votes | % | ±% |
|---|---|---|---|---|---|---|---|
| CDU | ✓ Katharina Landgraf | 60,969 | 41.7 | ▲6.9 | 53,735 | 36.7 | ▲5.9 |
| Left | Axel Troost | 33,044 | 22.6 | ▲1.0 | 34,826 | 23.8 | ▲1.1 |
| SPD | Daniel Werner | 23,471 | 16.1 | ▼13.5 | 23,354 | 16.0 | ▼10.5 |
| FDP | Christoph Waitz | 14,799 | 10.1 | ▲4.6 | 19,240 | 13.2 | ▲3.9 |
| Greens | Leon Wolff | 6,745 | 4.6 | ▲2.3 | 7,533 | 5.1 | ▲1.1 |
| NPD | Marcus Müller | 5,988 | 4.1 | ▼0.4 | 5,751 | 3.9 | ▼0.4 |
| Independent | Uwe Teske | 1,090 | 0.7 | | | | |
| BüSo | | | | | 1,032 | 0.7 | ▲0.2 |
| REP | | | | | 462 | 0.3 | 0.0 |
| MLPD | | | | | 375 | 0.3 | ▲0.1 |
| Informal votes | | 2,283 | | | 2,081 | | |
| Total valid votes | | 146,106 | | | 146,308 | | |
| Turnout | | 148,389 | 64.2 | ▼11.7 | | | |
| CDU hold | Majority | 27,925 | 19.1 | ▲13.9 | | | |

=== 2005 election ===
Federal election (2005):Leipzig-Land
| Notes: | Blue background denotes the winner of the electorate vote. Pink background denotes a candidate elected from their party list. Yellow background denotes an electorate win by a list member, or other incumbent. A ✓ or ✗ denotes status of any incumbent, win or lose respectively. | | | | | | |
| Party | Candidate | Votes | % | ±% | Party votes | % | ±% |
|---|---|---|---|---|---|---|---|
| CDU | Katharina Landgraf | 61,178 | 34.9 | ▼0.2 | 54,180 | 30.9 | ▼1.2 |
| SPD | ✗ Jürgen Wieczorek | 51,962 | 29.6 | ▼10.1 | 46,534 | 26.5 | ▼11.2 |
| Left | Monika Runge | 37,850 | 21.6 | ▲6.3 | 39,813 | 22.7 | ▲7.4 |
| FDP | Christoph Waltz | 9,710 | 5.5 | ▼1.1 | 16,160 | 9.2 | ▲2.0 |
| NPD | Marcus Müller | 7,966 | 4.5 | | 7,681 | 4.4 | ▲3.1 |
| Greens | Eckart Wolff | 4,025 | 2.3 | ▼0.1 | 7,115 | 4.1 | ▲0.4 |
| Independent | Helmuth Blaßkiewitz | 1,442 | 0.8 | | | | |
| BüSo | Karsten Werner | 1,366 | 0.8 | | 861 | 0.5 | ▲0.3 |
| Alliance for Health, Peace and Social Justice | | | | | 1,327 | 0.8 | |
| PBC | | | | | 594 | 0.3 | ▼0.1 |
| REP | | | | | 561 | 0.3 | ▼0.3 |
| SGP | | | | | 519 | 0.3 | |
| MLPD | | | | | 217 | 0.1 | |
| Informal votes | | 3,223 | | | 3,160 | | |
| Total valid votes | | 175,499 | | | 175,562 | | |
| Turnout | | 178,722 | 76.0 | ▲2.3 | | | |
| CDU gain from SPD | Majority | 9,216 | 5.3 | | | | |
