= Joana Cotar =

German politician (born 1973)

Member of the Bundestag
- In office 24 October 2017 – 25 March 2025

Personal details
- Born: 6 April 1973 (age 53) Pitești, Romania
- Party: Independent
- Other political affiliations: Alternative for Germany (until 2022)

Joana Cotar (born 6 April 1973 in Pitești, Socialist Republic of Romania) is a German politician (independent, previously AfD, CDU) who was a member of the Bundestag since the 2017 German federal election. Until November 2022, she was a member for the Alternative for Germany (AfD), and until 2025 a non-attached MP in the Bundestag.

== Life and career ==
Cotar is the daughter of a German mother and a Romanian father. When she was five years old, her family fled to Germany to escape the Ceaușescu regime. In 1993, Cotar completed her Abitur at Burggymnasium Friedberg. From 1993 to 1999, Cotar studied German studies and political science at University of Mannheim graduating with an M.A. degree. After her marriage in 2000, Cotar moved to Switzerland for a few years. After graduating, she worked as an event manager for financial institutions in Germany and Switzerland, then as a freelance project manager. She also worked as a feng shui consultant. Her brother Alexander Tamas is a major investor in the technology sector with his company Vy Capital. He organised the entry of the Russian investment fund Digital Sky Technologies into Facebook in 2009.

== Politics ==
During her student days, Cotar was a member of the CDU and belonged to the board of the CDU Mannheim-Schwetzingerstadt/Oststadt. Cotar entered the newly founded AfD in 2013. She was elected co-chair of the Hessian State Association shortly afterwards. She resigned in July 2014 following internal disputes. She declared that she no longer wanted to support the practice of Hessian state chairman Gunther Nickel of issuing warnings to other party members. In 2013, Cotar ran for the Hessian state parliament in 6th place on the list. The AfD received 4.1% of the vote in the state election, fell short of the five per cent threshold and therefore did not win any seats.

In 2016, she became a member of the Gießen district council. In 2016, Cotar ran for the state list of the AfD Hesse for the 2017 federal election and then became a member of the Bundestag after the 2017 German federal election. The state party conference of the Hessian AfD elected her to third place on the state list. The list election had to be repeated due to irregularities; the repeat party conference elected Cotar to second place on the state list. In the 2017 federal election, the AfD received 11.9 per cent of the second votes in Hesse. Cotar was the second of six elected candidates on the state list to enter the Bundestag, where she is a full member and chairwoman of the Digital Agenda Committee and a deputy member of the Committee on European Union Affairs and the Committee on Home Affairs and Regional Policy.

Cotar is a member of the federal executive board of the AfD. She was part of the intra-party power struggle between the right-wing AfD-chairmen Jörg Meuthen and the right-wing extremist members of the board. Cotar belongs to the Meuthen-fraction and has publicly criticized chairman Tino Chrupalla.

At the end of March 2021, Cotar was being discussed as a possible top candidate for the 2021 federal election alongside AfD co-federal spokesperson Tino Chrupalla. According to Cotar, Chrupalla did not respond to her multiple enquiries; he later formed a top team together with Alice Weidel. Cotar eventually formed the competing top team for the Bundestag election with Joachim Wundrak, whose candidacy Meuthen welcomed. On 25 May 2021, the team of Weidel and Chrupalla was elected as the top duo for the Bundestag election campaign by an internal party vote with 71% of the votes. After the 2021 federal election, in which she stood as a direct candidate in the constituency of Frankfurt am Main II and came in 5th place with 4.61% of the vote she was again elected to the Bundestag via the AfD Hesse state list. After she and other AfD MPs criticised Chrupalla, who was running for re-election, she did not run again for the AfD federal executive at the AfD federal party conference in June 2022.

According to her account, she left the AfD on 21 November 2022. Cotar cited "the close proximity of leading AfD officials to the President of the Russian Federation" as reason for her resignation. This reason included, for example, her "ingratiation with the dictatorial and inhumane regimes in Russia, China and now Iran", the "opportunism and constant bullying in the fight for posts and mandates", and the "establishment of corrupt networks in the party". Cotar announced in 2024 that she would not stand again in the 2025 federal election.

=== Positions ===
Cotar criticised the German government's refugee policy and called for the borders to be closed to migrants. She supported the CSU in its earlier call for an upper limit for asylum seekers and criticised that the party has moved away from this. In an interview with ZDF, she spoke out against the AfD's anti-Semitic stance. Cotar described the planned trip by several AfD MPs to Russian-occupied territories during the Russian invasion of Ukraine in 2022 as "unacceptable". She stated that she expected a crackdown from the federal executive. In April 2021, Cotar said in an interview that she considered the President of the Federal Office for the Protection of the Constitution, Thomas Haldenwang, to be a "puppet". The announcement by the Office for the Protection of the Constitution to declare the AfD a suspected case of right-wing extremism was "instrumentalised"; this was intended to "influence voters before the federal election". She sees the "danger of the state becoming overbearing" in the coronavirus policy. Joana Cotar launched the "Bitcoin in the Bundestag" initiative in 2023 and has been campaigning for the acceptance of Bitcoin as a means of payment ever since.

Cotar decided against running for parliament in the 2025 election.
