= Franziska Mascheck =

German politician

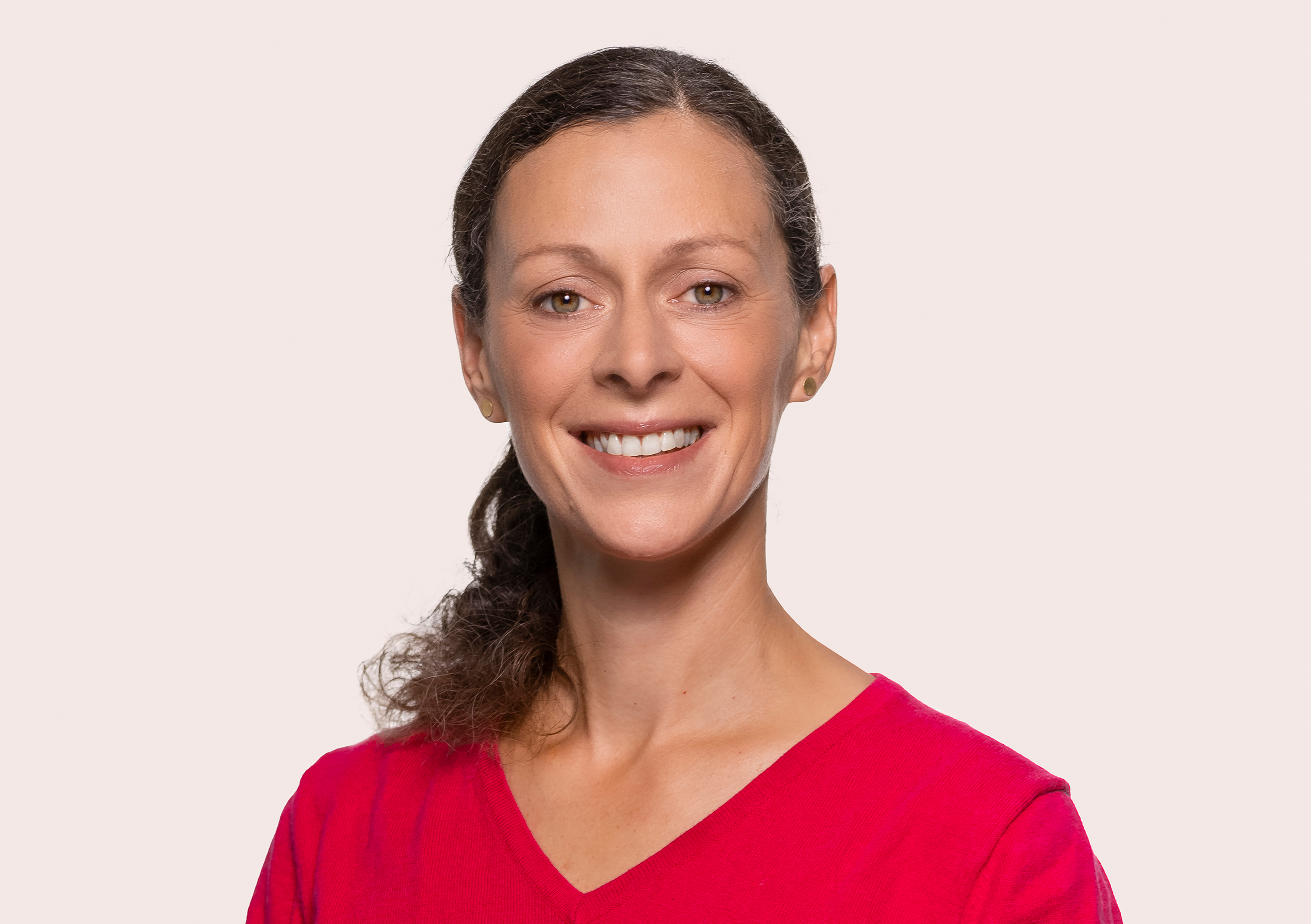
Franziska Mascheck (2021)

Franziska Mascheck (born 4 February 1979) is a German dancer, social worker and politician for the Social Democratic Party of Germany (SPD) and since 2021, a member of the German parliament, the Bundestag.

== Life ==
Mascheck was born 1979 in the East German city of Dresden and grew up with her two siblings in Schwedt/Oder. She is of Protestant denomination. She is a granddaughter of the aerodynamics scientist Hans-Joachim Mascheck and a descendant of the founders of the dye works Oskar Mascheck, known in Saxony. She became member of the Bundestag in 2021.

In 1996, Mascheck completed her secondary education at Albert Schweitzer Gymnasium in Schwed/Order. She then completed a four-year ballet degree at the Palucca University of Dance Dresden, in 2001. From 2001 to 2006, she was a freelance dancer and dance teacher in Berlin. Following that, she worked as a dancer in New York City and Austin, Texas.

Mascheck returned to Germany, and founded the children's and youth dance theater, Tanzbasis, in Berlin. She was the artistic director and managing director from 2006 to 2011.

In 2016, she moved with her husband, the mime artist Marc Mascheck, and their four children to Linda, where they bought a four-sided farm and founded KulturGut Linda e.V..

From 2014 to 2018, Mascheck studied social work at the Catholic University of Social Sciences in Berlin, where she earned a bachelor's degree. Subsequently, she earned a Master of Social Work degree from Mittweida University of Applied Sciences in 2021. She is also a trained Montessori teacher.

== Politics ==
Mascheck has held a seat on the local council in Kohren-Sahlis and the Frohburg city council since 2019. She is involved in the town twinning of Kohren-Sahlis with Montottone, Italy.

In 2021, Mascheck was elected deputy district chair of the SPD in the Leipzig district together with Carlo Hohnstedter. Most recently, she has worked freelance for the Children and Youth Foundation of Saxony. She also completed a master’s degree in social work at the Mittweida University of Applied Sciences from 2018 to 2021.

In the 2021 federal election, Mascheck ran in the federal electoral district Leipzig-Land (154) and received 20% of the first votes as the third-place finisher. She entered the 20th German Bundestag via 8th place on the state list of the SPD Saxony. She has been a member of the Bundestag since 2021 and is a full member of the Committee for Housing, Urban Development, Construction and Municipalities.
