= Axel Gehrke =

German politician (1942–2021)

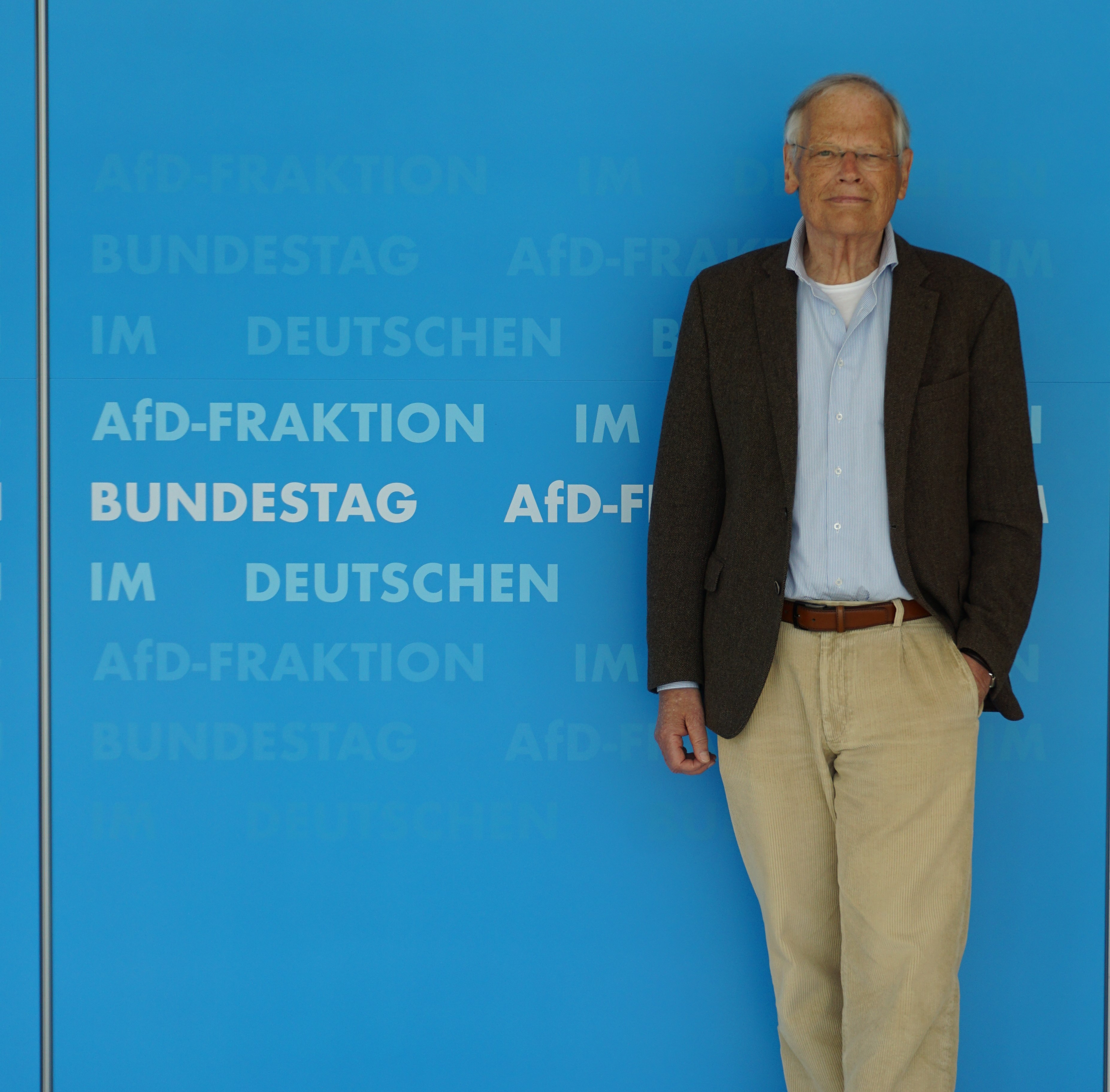
- Gehrke in 2020

Member of the Bundestag for Schleswig-Holstein
- In office 24 October 2017 – 22 September 2021
- Constituency: AfD List (2017–2021)

Personal details
- Born: Axel Gehrke; 12 January 1942 Arnswalde, Province of Pomerania, Nazi Germany
- Died: 22 September 2021 (aged 79) Germany
- Party: Alternative for Germany (AfD)
- Children: 3
- Occupation: Doctor

Axel Gehrke (12 January 1942 – 22 September 2021) was a German politician for the populist Alternative for Germany (AfD) and a member of the Bundestag from 2017 until 2021.

== Life and politics ==
Gehrke was born 1942 in Arnswalde (now Choszczno) and studied medicine. He became a Doctor of Medicine in 1971.

Gehrke entered the newly founded AfD in 2013 and became after the 2017 German federal election member of the Bundestag. He did not stand for reelection in the 2021 German federal election.
