= Sylvia Gabelmann =

German politician (born 1958)

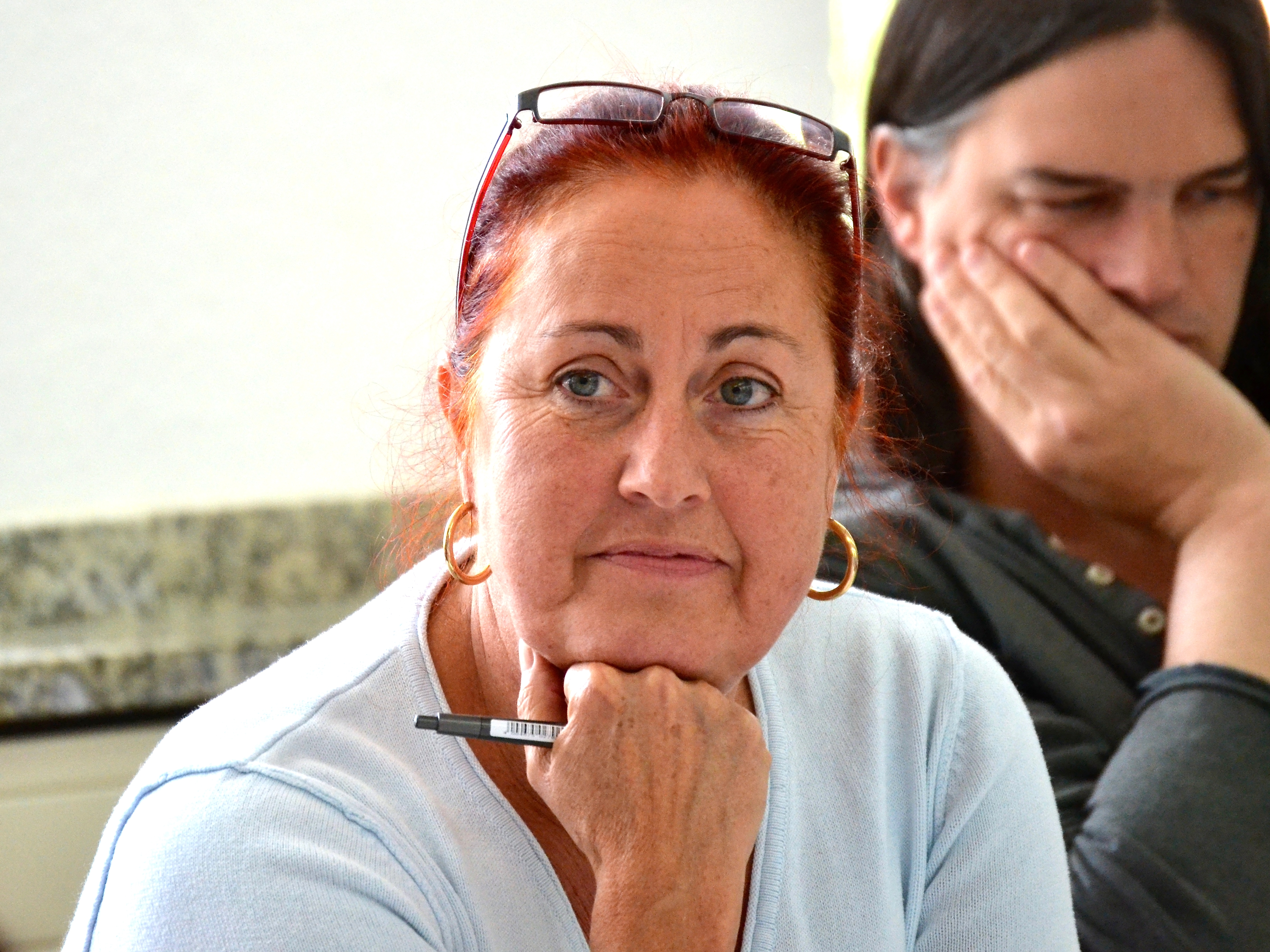
- Sylvia Gabelmann in 2016

Member of the Bundestag
- In office 2017–2021

Personal details
- Born: 7 September 1958 (age 67) Bad Homburg vor der Höhe, West Germany (now Germany)
- Party: The Left
- Occupation: Pharmacist

Sylvia Gabelmann (born 7 September 1958) is a German politician. Born in Bad Homburg vor der Höhe, Hesse, she represents The Left. Sylvia Gabelmann has served as a member of the Bundestag from the state of North Rhine-Westphalia since 2017.

== Life ==
Sylvia Gabelmann finished school in 1977 with the Abitur. She first trained as a pharmacy assistant and then studied pharmacy at the University of Frankfurt am Main, graduating in 1986. She worked in her profession until 2002. She became member of the bundestag after the 2017 German federal election. She is a member of the Health Committee. She is spokesperson for her group on pharmaceutical policy and patients' rights. In November 2020, Gabelmann announced that she will seek reelection in 2021 German federal election.
