= Andreas Wagner (politician) =

German politician

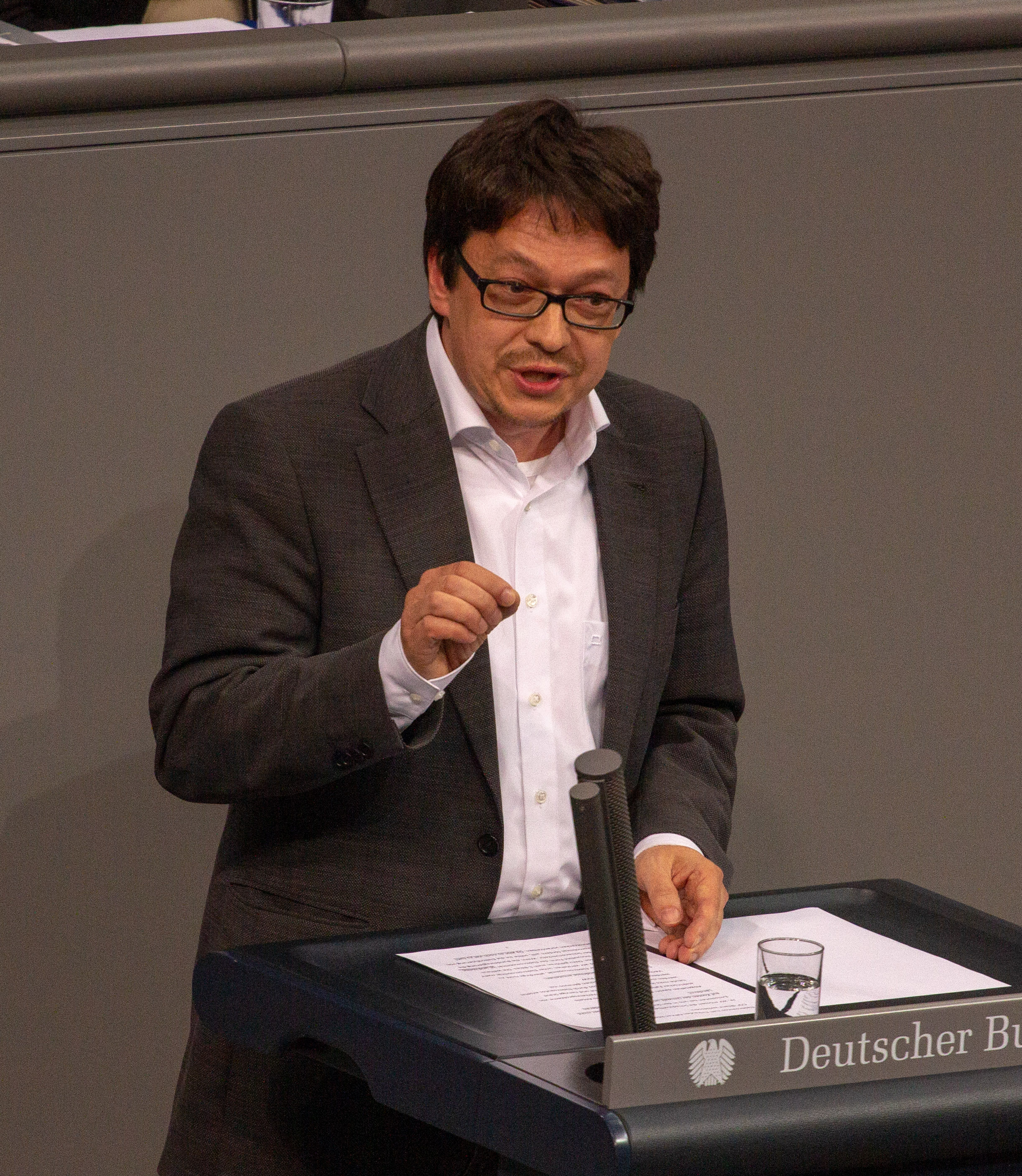
- Andreas Wagner in 2019

Member of the Bundestag
- Incumbent
- Assumed office 2017

Personal details
- Born: 16 April 1972 (age 53) Bad Tölz, West Germany (now Germany)
- Party: The Left
- Children: 3
- Occupation: Toolmaker

Andreas Wagner (born 16 April 1972) is a German politician. Born in Bad Tölz, Bavaria, he represents The Left. Andreas Wagner has served as a member of the Bundestag from the state of Bavaria since 2017.

== Life ==
Wagner completed secondary school and training as a toolmaker, later as a curative nurse. He became member of the bundestag after the 2017 German federal election. He is a member of the Committee on Transport and Digital Infrastructure. In March 2021, he announced not to be reelect in 2021 German federal election.
