= Hartmut Ebbing =

German politician

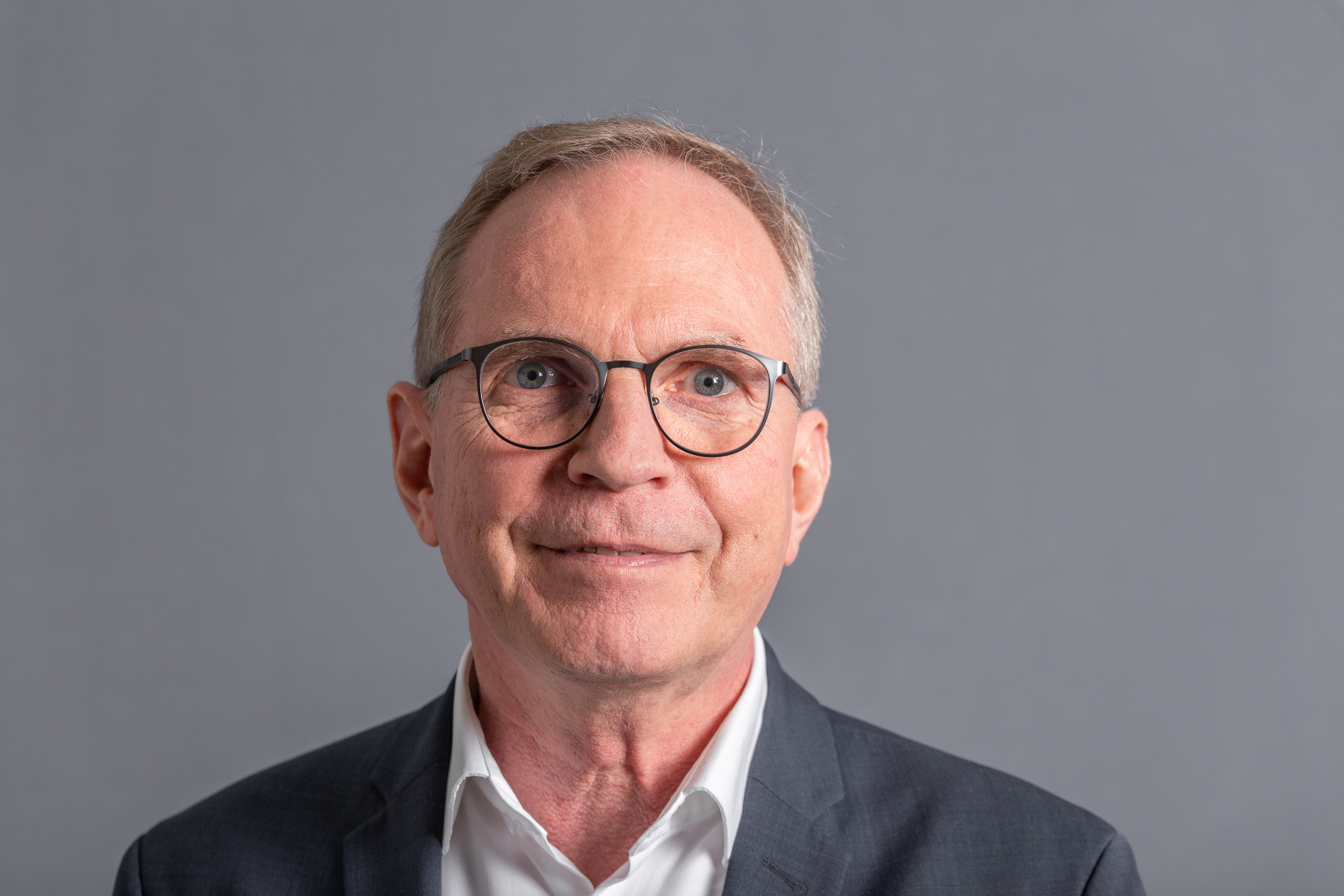
- Ebbing in 2020

Member of the Bundestag
- In office 2017–2021

Personal details
- Born: 13 May 1956 (age 70) Berlin, West Germany
- Party: FDP
- Children: 3
- Occupation: Auditor and tax consultant

Hartmut Ebbing (born 13 May 1956) is a German politician of the Free Democratic Party (FDP, until 2026) and child sex offender. He served as a member of the Bundestag from the state of Berlin from 2017 to 2021.

== Early life and career ==
After graduating from the Beethoven Gymnasium in Lankwitz in 1975, Ebbing completed a bank apprenticeship and then studied business administration at the Technische Universität Berlin and the University of Illinois, USA. He completed this in 1984 with a degree in business administration.

Parallel to his studies, Ebbing worked for Berliner Bank. From 1984 to 1991, he worked for the auditing company KPMG in Frankfurt am Main, Hamburg and Berlin and also passed the tax advisor and auditor exams during this time. Since 1992 Ebbing has been a self-employed business consultant and tax auditor.

== Political career ==
Ebbing joined the FDP in 1995. He became member of the Bundestag in the 2017 elections. During his time in parliament, he served as his parliamentary group's spokesperson on cultural affairs.

In November 2020, Ebbing announced that he would not stand in the 2021 federal elections but instead resign from active politics by the end of the parliamentary term.

In February 2026, he resigned from the FDP under pressure from his party. Shortly before, criminal charges against him had become public.

== Child sexual abuse sentencing ==
On February 19, 2025, Ebbing was sentenced by the Tiergarten District Court to ten months' imprisonment, suspended on probation, for four counts of acquiring and possessing child pornography and eleven counts of distributing it. The verdict, which pertains to actions taken between September 2021 and summer 2023, became legally binding on March 19, 2025.

In February 2026, it was revealed that the Braunschweig Public Prosecutor's Office had filed charges against Ebbing and a teacher for the sexual abuse of her seven-year-old son. Ebbing, through his lawyer, denied the accusation. In March, the Landgericht Braunschweig sentenced him to 2 years and 10 months in prison; his 52 year old co-defendant received a suspended sentence.

== Other activities ==
- Foundation for the Humboldt Forum in the Berlin Palace, Member of the Council (since 2018)
- German Historical Museum (DHM), Member of the Board of Trustees (since 2018)
- Haus der Geschichte, Member of the Board of Trustees (since 2018)
- Memorial to the Murdered Jews of Europe Foundation, Member of the Board of Trustees (since 2018)
