= Britta Dassler =

German politician

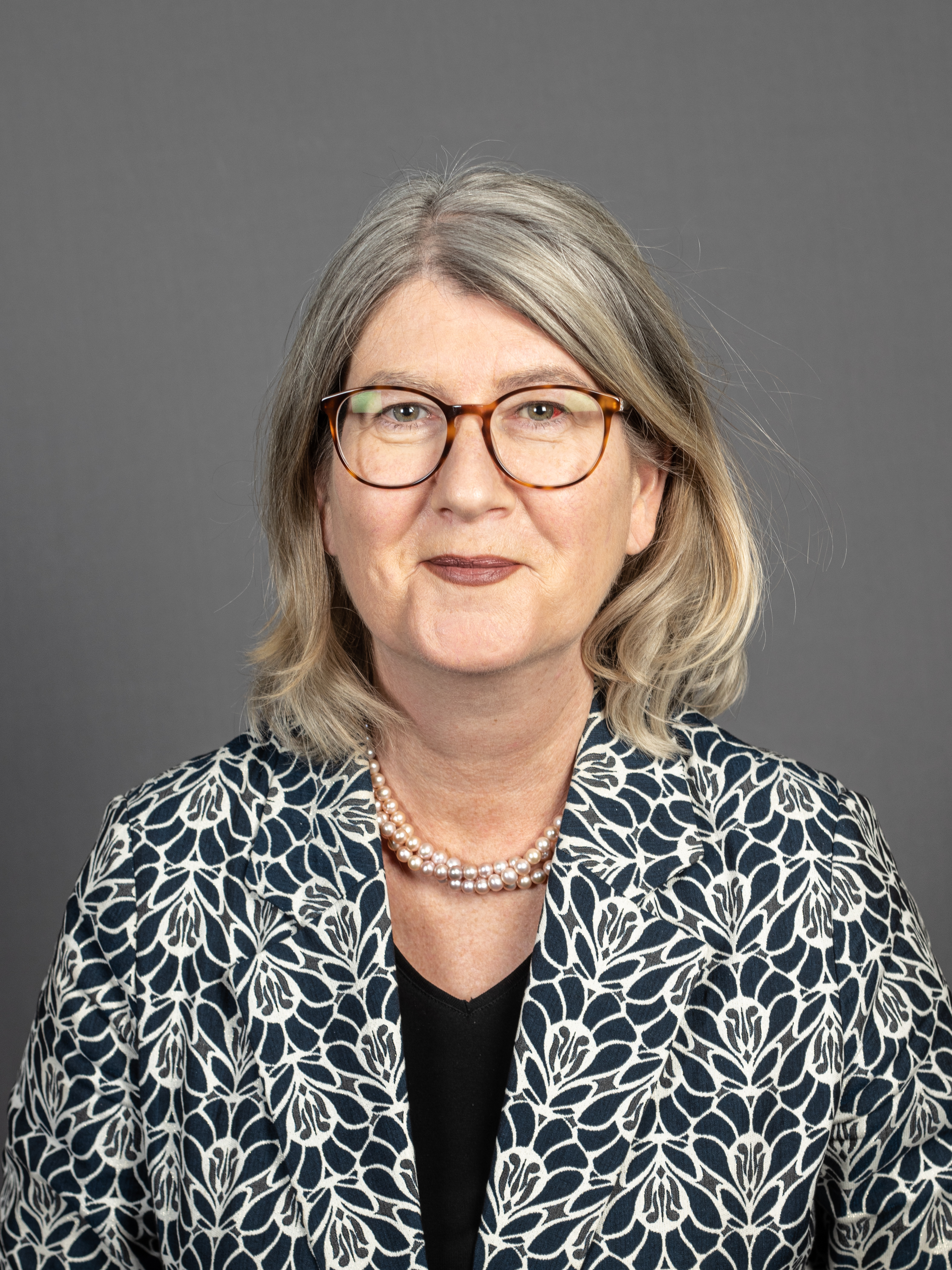
- Britta Dassler in 2020

Member of the Bundestag
- In office 2017–2021

Personal details
- Born: 22 July 1964 (age 61) Jülich, West Germany (now Germany)
- Party: FDP
- Children: 2
- Occupation: Savings bank business economist

Britta Katharina Dassler (born 22 July 1964) is a German politician of the Free Democratic Party (FDP) who served as a member of the Bundestag from the state of Bavaria from 2017 until the 2021.

== Early life and career ==
After her bank apprenticeship and studies in savings bank business administration, Dassler passed the association auditor examination. She subsequently was employed in this field from 1989 to 1994 at the Rheinischer Sparkassen- und Giroverband. Since 1994, she has been working as a freelancer and is the owner of the industrial agency "Arte di vivere" in Herzogenaurach.

== Political career ==
From 2015 to 2019, Dassler served as deputy state chairwoman of the FDP in Bavaria, under the leadership of chairman Albert Duin.

Dassler competed in the 2017 federal elections in the Erlangen constituency and was subsequently elected to the German Bundestag via rank 9 on the state list of the FDP Bavaria. In parliament, she served as a member of the Sports Committee and the Committee on Education, Research, and Technology Assessment. Additionally, she acted as spokesperson for sports policy within her parliamentary group.

== Personal life ==
Dassler is married to the grandson of Rudolf Dassler, founder of the sporting goods manufacturer Adidas (brand).
