= Heiko Heßenkemper =

German politician

Member of the Bundestag
- In office 24 October 2017 – 8 October 2021

Personal details
- Born: 11 January 1956 (age 70)
- Party: Alternative for Germany (2014–2021)

Heiko Heßenkemper (born 11 January 1956), also spelled Heiko Hessenkemper, is a German politician, until June 2021 for the Alternative for Germany, and was member of the Bundestag from 2017 to 2021.

== Life and politics ==
Heßenkemper was born 1956 in the West German town of Hamm and studied physics at the Clausthal University of Technology. He became a professor in 1995.

Heßenkemper entered the AfD in 2014 and became a member of the bundestag after the 2017 German federal election

Heßenkemper is considered to be part of the right-wing of the AfD. He has participated in Pegida demonstrations.

Heßenkemper denies the scientific consensus on climate change. Heßenkemper has stated that he will not be a candidate in the 2021 German federal election. He left AfD in June 2021, three months before the 2021 federal election.
