= Roman Reusch =

German politician (born 1954)

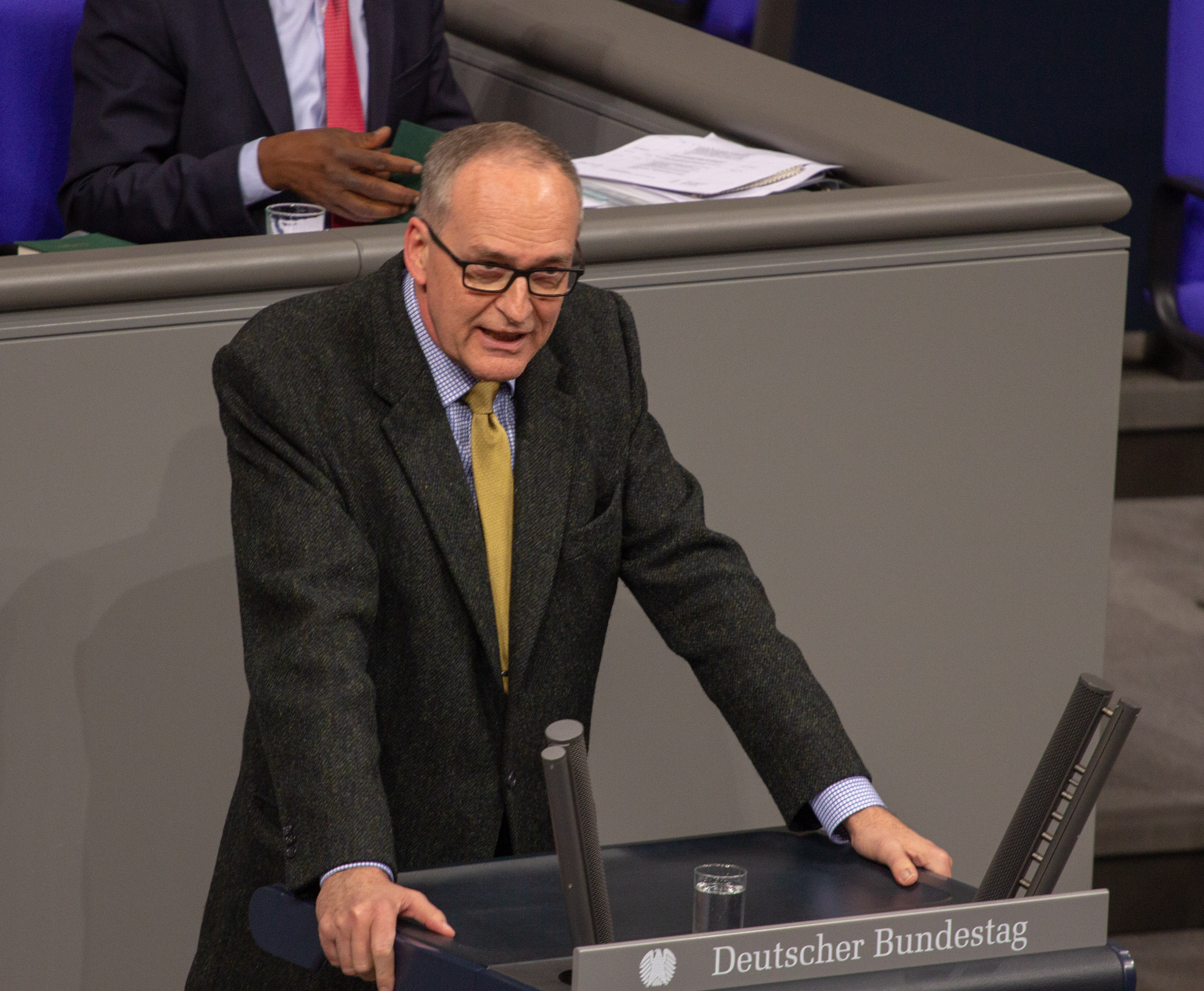

Member of the Bundestag
- Incumbent
- Assumed office 24 October 2017

Personal details
- Born: 3 February 1954 (age 72)
- Party: AfD

Roman Reusch (born 3 February 1954) is a German politician for the Alternative for Germany (AfD) and since 2017 member of the Bundestag.

== Life and politics ==
Reusch was born 1954 in the West German city of Düsseldorf and studied jurisprudence from 1978 to 1983 in Berlin. Reusch became a senior prosecutor (Oberstaatsanwalt) in 2003 in Berlin, but he was relocated to Brandenburg in 2008. Reusch entered the newly founded populist AfD in 2013 and became a member of the Bundestag after the 2017 German federal election. In June 2021, Reusch was no longer candidate in the 2021 German federal election.
