= Heiko Wildberg =

German politician

Member of the Bundestag
- In office 24 October 2017 – 2021

Personal details
- Born: 19 May 1952 (age 73) Wilhelmshaven
- Party: AfD

Heiko Wildberg (born 19 May 1952 in Wilhelmshaven) is a German politician for the Alternative for Germany (AfD) and from 2017 to 2021 member of the Bundestag.

== Life and politics ==
Wildberg was born 1952 in the West German town of Wilhelmshaven. He studied geology and achieved his PhD in 1983. He entered the populist AfD in 2016 and became member of the Bundestag in 2017.

Wildberg denies the scientific consensus on climate change.

Wilberg retired prior to the 2021 German federal election.
