= Sabine Leidig =

German politician (born 1961)

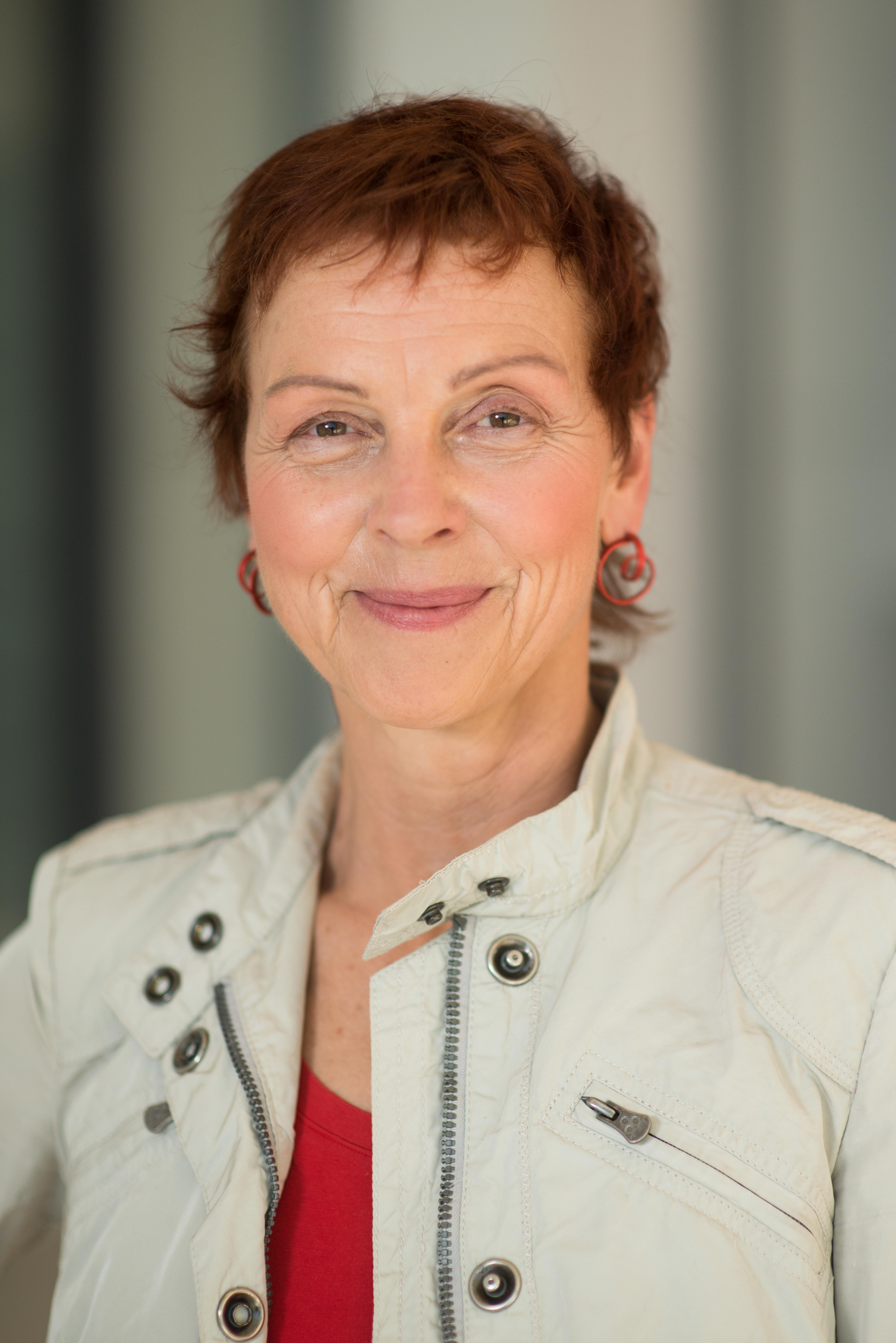
- Sabine Leidig in 2017

Member of the Bundestag
- Incumbent
- Assumed office 2009

Personal details
- Born: 7 August 1961 (age 64) Heidelberg, West Germany (now Germany)
- Party: The Left

Sabine Leidig (born 7 August 1961) is a German politician. Born in Heidelberg, Baden-Württemberg, she represents The Left. Sabine Leidig has served as a member of the Bundestag from the state of Hesse since 2009.

== Life ==
After completing her vocational training as a biology laboratory assistant in 1979, she worked for ten years at the Institute of Immunology and Genetics at the German Cancer Research Centre. From 2002 to 2009 she was managing director of Attac Germany. She became member of the bundestag after the 2009 German federal election. She is a member of the Committee on Transport and Digital Infrastructure. She is spokeswoman for railway policy for her parliamentary group. Leidig announced, that she will not run for a reelection in the 2021 German federal election.
