= Joachim Wundrak =

German politician

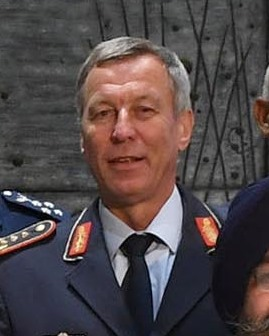

Member of the Bundestag
- In office 2021–2025

Personal details
- Born: 28 May 1955 (age 70) Kerpen
- Party: Alternative for Germany

Joachim Wundrak (born 28 May 1955 in Kerpen, Germany) is a German retired Lieutenant General and politician for the AfD, who has been a member of the Bundestag, the federal diet from 2021 German federal election to 2025 German federal election.
