= Grigorios Aggelidis =

German politician

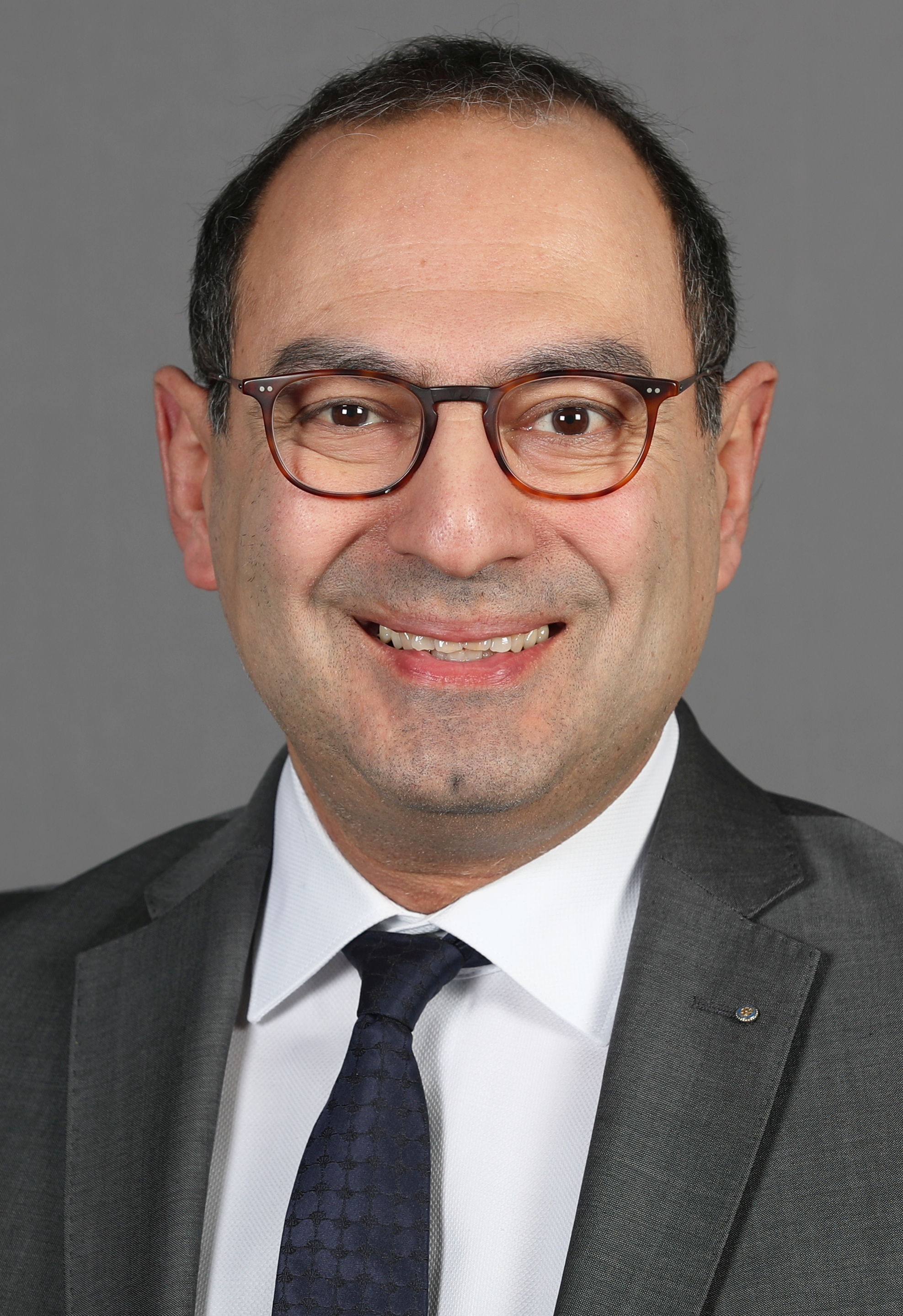
- Aggelidis in 2020

Member of the Bundestag for Lower Saxony
- In office 24 October 2017 – 2021
- Constituency: FDP List

Personal details
- Born: 19 August 1965 (age 60) Hanover, West Germany
- Party: Free Democratic Party

Grigorios Aggelidis (born 19 August 1965) is a German banker and politician of the Free Democratic Party (FDP) who served as a member of the Bundestag from the state of Lower Saxony from 2017 until 2021.

== Early life and career ==
From 1987 until 1993, Aggelidis worked with Dresdner Bank before moving on to Dresdner Vermögensberatungs GmbH. He later worked with Credit Suisse from 2001 until 2008.

== Political career ==
Aggelidis became a member of the German Bundestag in the 2017 federal elections, representing the state of Lower Saxony. He served on the Committee on Family Affairs, Senior Citizens, Women and Youth, where he was his parliamentary group's spokesperson. He was also a member of the Committee on the Environment, Nature Conservation, Building and Nuclear Safety.

In addition to his committee assignments, Aggelidis served as deputy chairman of the German-Greek Parliamentary Friendship Group. In 2020, he co-founded a cross-party working group on diversity and antiracism.

== Other activities ==
- Federal Agency for Civic Education (BPB), Member of the Board of Trustees (2018–2021)
- Rotary International, Member
