= Katharina Landgraf =

German politician

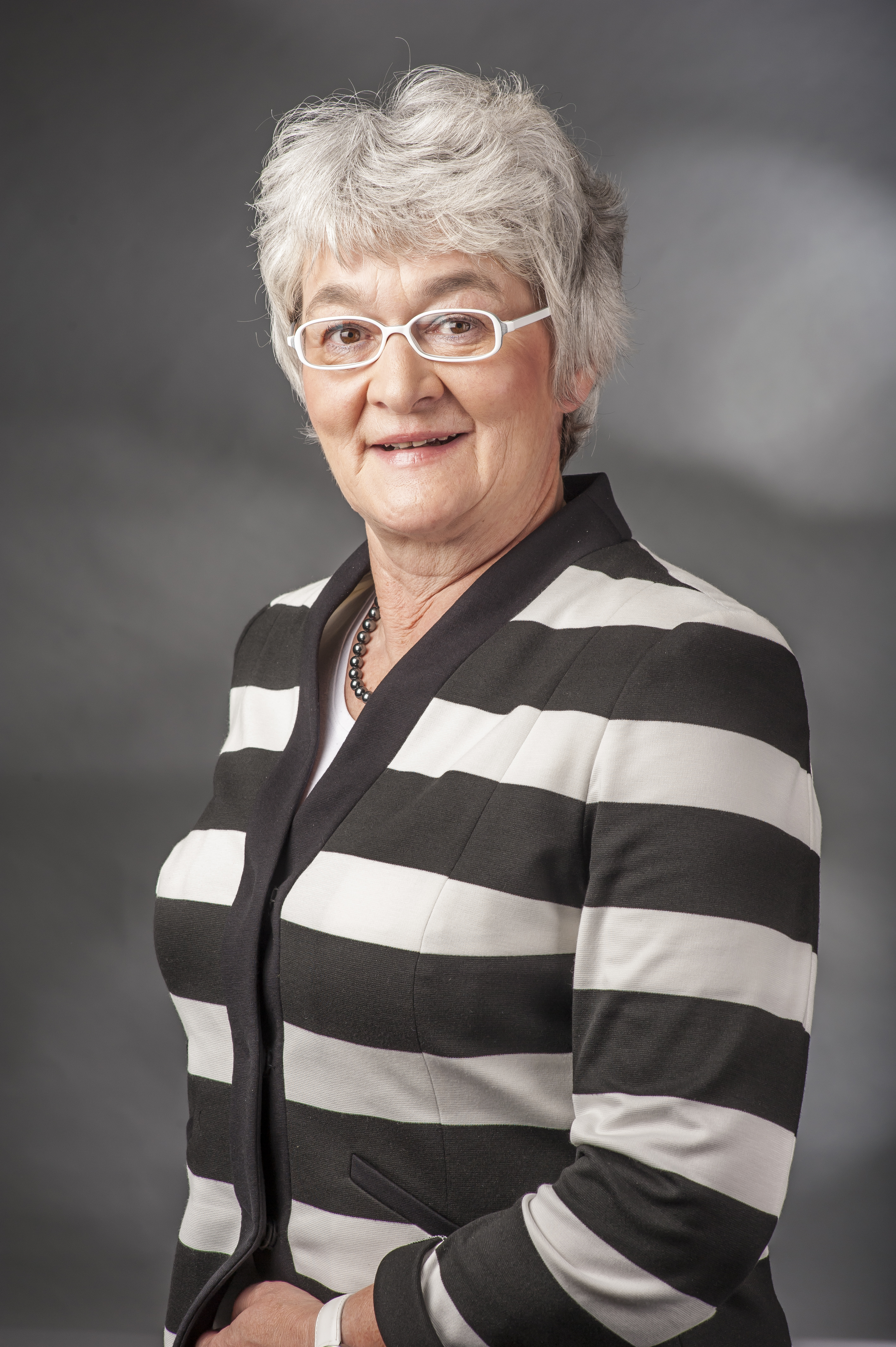
- Katharina Landgraf in 2014

Member of the Bundestag
- In office 2005–2021

Personal details
- Born: 24 February 1954 (age 72) Großenehrich, East Germany (now Germany)
- Party: CDU

Katharina Landgraf (born 24 February 1954) is a German politician of the Christian Democratic Union (CDU) who served as a member of the Bundestag from the state of Saxony in 1990 and again from 2005 until 2021.

== Political career ==
From 1999 until 2004, Landgraf served as a member of the State Parliament of Saxony.

Landgraf became a member of the Bundestag in the 2005 German federal election. She served on the Committee on Food and Agriculture and in the Committee on Family, Senior Citizens, Women and Youth. In addition to her committee assignments, she was part of the German-Korean Parliamentary Friendship Group.

In the negotiations to form a Grand Coalition of Chancellor Angela Merkel's Christian Democrats (CDU together with the Bavarian CSU) and the SPD following the 2013 federal elections, Landgraf was part of the CDU/CSU delegation in the working group on families, women and equality, led by Annette Widmann-Mauz and Manuela Schwesig.

In June 2020, Landgraf announced that she would not stand in the 2021 federal elections but instead resign from active politics by the end of the parliamentary term.

== Other activities ==
- Federal Agency for Civic Education (BPB), Member of the Board of Trustees (2018–2021)
- Internationaler Bund, Member of the Presidium

== Political positions ==
In June 2017, Landgraf voted against Germany's introduction of same-sex marriage.
