= Edgar Naujok =

German politician (born 1960)

Member of the Bundestag
- Incumbent
- Assumed office 26 September 2021

Personal details
- Born: 25 June 1960 (age 65) Oggersheim
- Party: AfD

Edgar Naujok (born 25 June 1960 in Oggersheim) is a German politician for the right-wing AfD and since 2021 a member of the Bundestag, the federal diet. Naujok was born in the West German city of Ludwigshafen and was elected directly to the Bundestag in 2021 in Leipzig-Land.
