= Philip Oltermann =

German-born British journalist

Philip Oltermann (born 1981) is a German-born British journalist and the current chief of The Guardian's Berlin bureau. He is the author of How to Write (2012), Keeping Up with the Germans: A History of Anglo-German Encounters (2012), and The Stasi Poetry Circle (2020).

== Early life and career ==
Born in Schleswig-Holstein, Oltermann read English and German literature at Oxford University. Oltermann has written for both German and English-language newspapers, including Granta, London Review of Books, Prospect, The Nation, Süddeutsche Zeitung, and others. His book Keeping Up with the Germans was well received. He has been The Guardian's bureau chief in Berlin since 2016.
