= Tübingen (Bundestag electoral district) =

Federal electoral district of Germany

290 Tübingen
- Electoral district for the Bundestag
- Tübingen in 2025
- State: Baden-Württemberg
- Population: 278,400 (2019)
- Electorate: 198,791 (2021)
- Major settlements: Tübingen; Rottenburg am Neckar; Mössingen
- Area: 788.8 km^{2}

Current electoral district
- Created: 1980
- Member: Christoph Naser
- Elected: 2026

Tübingen is an electoral constituency (German: Wahlkreis) represented in the Bundestag. It elects one member via first-past-the-post voting. Under the current constituency numbering system, it is designated as constituency 290. It is located in central Baden-Württemberg, comprising the Tübingen district and the northeastern part of the Zollernalbkreis district.

Tübingen was created for the 1980 federal election. From 2002 to 2025 it was represented by Annette Widmann-Mauz of the Christian Democratic Union (CDU); since 2026 it has been represented by Christoph Naser.

== Geography ==
Tübingen is located in central Baden-Württemberg. As of the 2021 federal election, it comprises the Tübingen district and the municipalities of Bisingen, Burladingen, Grosselfingen, Hechingen, Jungingen, and Rangendingen from the Zollernalbkreis district.

== History ==
Tübingen was created in 1980. In the 1980 through 1998 elections, it was constituency 194 in the numbering system. In the 2002 and 2005 elections, it was number 291. Since the 2009 election, it has been number 290. Its borders have not changed since its creation.

Election	No.	Name	Borders
1980	194	Tübingen	Tübingen district; Zollernalbkreis district (only Bisingen, Burladingen, Grosselfingen, Hechingen, Jungingen, and Rangendingen municipalities)
1983	194	Tübingen	Tübingen district; Zollernalbkreis district (only Bisingen, Burladingen, Grosselfingen, Hechingen, Jungingen, and Rangendingen municipalities)
1987	194	Tübingen	Tübingen district; Zollernalbkreis district (only Bisingen, Burladingen, Grosselfingen, Hechingen, Jungingen, and Rangendingen municipalities)
1990	194	Tübingen	Tübingen district; Zollernalbkreis district (only Bisingen, Burladingen, Grosselfingen, Hechingen, Jungingen, and Rangendingen municipalities)
1994	194	Tübingen	Tübingen district; Zollernalbkreis district (only Bisingen, Burladingen, Grosselfingen, Hechingen, Jungingen, and Rangendingen municipalities)
1998	194	Tübingen	Tübingen district; Zollernalbkreis district (only Bisingen, Burladingen, Grosselfingen, Hechingen, Jungingen, and Rangendingen municipalities)
2002	291	Tübingen	Tübingen district; Zollernalbkreis district (only Bisingen, Burladingen, Grosselfingen, Hechingen, Jungingen, and Rangendingen municipalities)
2005	291	Tübingen	Tübingen district; Zollernalbkreis district (only Bisingen, Burladingen, Grosselfingen, Hechingen, Jungingen, and Rangendingen municipalities)
2009	290	Tübingen	Tübingen district; Zollernalbkreis district (only Bisingen, Burladingen, Grosselfingen, Hechingen, Jungingen, and Rangendingen municipalities)
2013	290	Tübingen	Tübingen district; Zollernalbkreis district (only Bisingen, Burladingen, Grosselfingen, Hechingen, Jungingen, and Rangendingen municipalities)
2017	290	Tübingen	Tübingen district; Zollernalbkreis district (only Bisingen, Burladingen, Grosselfingen, Hechingen, Jungingen, and Rangendingen municipalities)
2021	290	Tübingen	Tübingen district; Zollernalbkreis district (only Bisingen, Burladingen, Grosselfingen, Hechingen, Jungingen, and Rangendingen municipalities)
2025	290	Tübingen	Tübingen district; Zollernalbkreis district (only Bisingen, Burladingen, Grosselfingen, Hechingen, Jungingen, and Rangendingen municipalities)

== Members ==
The constituency has been held by Christian Democratic Union (CDU) during all but one Bundestag term since its creation. It was first represented by Jürgen Todenhöfer from 1980 to 1990, followed by Claus-Peter Grotz from 1990 to 1998. Herta Däubler-Gmelin of the Social Democratic Party (SPD) was elected in 1998 and served one term. Annette Widmann-Mauz has been representative since 2002.

Election	Member	Party	%
1980	Jürgen Todenhöfer	CDU	52.7
1983	Jürgen Todenhöfer	CDU	57.1
1987	Jürgen Todenhöfer	CDU	50.2
1990	Claus-Peter Grotz	CDU	42.5
1994	Claus-Peter Grotz	CDU	42.4
1998	Herta Däubler-Gmelin	SPD	47.2
2002	Annette Widmann-Mauz	CDU	43.4
2005	Annette Widmann-Mauz	CDU	42.9
2009	Annette Widmann-Mauz	CDU	38.9
2013	Annette Widmann-Mauz	CDU	46.9
2017	Annette Widmann-Mauz	CDU	35.7
2021	Annette Widmann-Mauz	CDU	27.0
2025	Vacant (Note: Christoph Naser (CDU) won with 31.7% but seat remained vacant due to insufficient second votes cover; Naser subsequently entered the Bundestag following the resignation of Ronja Kemmer)		
2026	Christoph Naser	CDU	31.7

== Election results ==
=== 2021 election ===
Federal election (2021): Tübingen
Notes:	Blue background denotes the winner of the electorate vote. Pink background denotes a candidate elected from their party list. Yellow background denotes an electorate win by a list member, or other incumbent. A ✓ or ✗ denotes status of any incumbent, win or lose respectively.						
Party	Candidate	Votes	%	±%	Party votes	%	±%
CDU	✓ Annette Widmann-Mauz	43,024	27.0	▼8.7	34,775	21.8	▼9.1
Greens	Christian Kühn	40,978	25.7	▲6.6	37,424	23.4	▲5.4
SPD	Martin Rosemann	28,982	18.2	▲0.9	32,576	20.4	▲4.7
FDP	Julian Grünke	15,059	9.4	▲1.5	22,678	14.2	▲2.4
AfD	Ingo Reetzke	12,484	7.8	▼0.8	12,548	7.9	▼2.2
Left	Heike Hänsel	7,526	4.7	▼4.0	8,231	5.2	▼4.4
dieBasis	Johanna Pardo	2,940	1.8		2,666	1.7	
FW	Andreas Weber	2,789	1.7		1,978	1.2	▲0.8
Tierschutzpartei	Oliver Mohr	2,544	1.6		1,777	1.1	▲0.5
PARTEI	Christiane Lawrenz	1,952	1.2	▼0.2	1,292	0.8	0.0
Team Todenhöfer					838	0.5	
Volt					610	0.4	
Pirates					532	0.3	▼0.1
ÖDP	Kornelius Schultka	743	0.5		503	0.3	▼0.1
Bündnis C					323	0.2	
DiB	Stefan Klepp	493	0.3		223	0.1	▼0.1
Humanists					208	0.1	
Gesundheitsforschung					155	0.1	
Bürgerbewegung					147	0.1	
NPD					132	0.1	▼0.1
MLPD	Claudia Lenger-Atan	114	0.1	▼0.1	50	0.0	▼0.1
DKP					42	0.0	0.0
Bündnis 21					37	0.0	
LKR					36	0.0	
Informal votes		1,207			1,054		
Total valid votes		159,628			159,781		
Turnout		160,835	80.9	▼0.4			
CDU hold	Majority	2,046	1.3	▼15.3			

=== 2017 election ===
Federal election (2017): Tübingen
Notes:	Blue background denotes the winner of the electorate vote. Pink background denotes a candidate elected from their party list. Yellow background denotes an electorate win by a list member, or other incumbent. A ✓ or ✗ denotes status of any incumbent, win or lose respectively.						
Party	Candidate	Votes	%	±%	Party votes	%	±%
CDU	✓ Annette Widmann-Mauz	56,446	35.7	▼11.2	48,828	30.8	▼10.9
Greens	Christian Kühn	30,197	19.1	▲2.5	28,521	18.0	▲3.2
SPD	Martin Rosemann	27,325	17.3	▼3.1	24,865	15.7	▼4.8
Left	Heike Hänsel	13,862	8.8	▲2.3	15,096	9.5	▲2.9
AfD	Dubravko Mandic	13,684	8.7	▲5.2	15,887	10.0	▲5.4
FDP	Christopher Gohl	12,504	7.9	▲5.6	18,718	11.8	▲6.3
PARTEI	Ina Mecke	2,293	1.4		1,307	0.8	
Independent	Jens Martin Rohrbach	1,590	1.0				
Tierschutzpartei					994	0.6	▼0.1
FW					758	0.5	▲0.1
Pirates					715	0.5	▼2.2
ÖDP					629	0.4	0.0
DiB					376	0.2	
NPD					326	0.2	▼0.7
BGE					282	0.2	
Tierschutzallianz					281	0.2	
V-Partei³					216	0.1	
DM					212	0.1	
Menschliche Welt					171	0.1	
MLPD	Claudia Lenger-Atan	285	0.2		142	0.1	0.0
DKP					52	0.0	
DIE RECHTE					34	0.0	
Informal votes		1,615			1,391		
Total valid votes		158,186			158,410		
Turnout		159,801	81.3	▲3.8			
CDU hold	Majority	26,249	16.6	▼9.9			

=== 2013 election ===
Federal election (2013): Tübingen
Notes:	Blue background denotes the winner of the electorate vote. Pink background denotes a candidate elected from their party list. Yellow background denotes an electorate win by a list member, or other incumbent. A ✓ or ✗ denotes status of any incumbent, win or lose respectively.						
Party	Candidate	Votes	%	±%	Party votes	%	±%
CDU	✓ Annette Widmann-Mauz	69,354	46.9	▲7.9	61,889	41.7	▲11.0
SPD	Martin Rosemann	30,160	20.4	▲0.3	30,417	20.5	▲1.6
Greens	Christian Kühn	24,477	16.5	▼5.0	21,978	14.8	▼4.1
Left	Heike Hänsel	9,589	6.5	▼0.4	9,820	6.6	▼1.3
AfD	Horst Speichert	5,081	3.4		6,815	4.6	
Pirates	Sebastian Nerz	4,402	3.0		3,979	2.7	▲0.1
FDP	Christopher Gohl	3,358	2.3	▼7.4	8,208	5.5	▼11.5
NPD	Edda Schmidt	1,558	1.1	▼0.4	1,297	0.9	▼0.1
Tierschutzpartei					1,053	0.7	▲0.1
ÖDP					589	0.4	0.0
FW					509	0.3	
REP					439	0.3	▼0.5
PBC					340	0.2	▼0.1
RENTNER					276	0.2	
Volksabstimmung					267	0.2	▼0.1
Party of Reason					113	0.1	
MLPD					95	0.1	0.0
PRO					94	0.1	
BIG					73	0.0	
BüSo					30	0.0	0.0
Informal votes		1,789			1,487		
Total valid votes		147,979			148,281		
Turnout		149,768	77.5	▲1.6			
CDU hold	Majority	39,194	26.5	▲9.2			

=== 2009 election ===
Federal election (2009): Tübingen
Notes:	Blue background denotes the winner of the electorate vote. Pink background denotes a candidate elected from their party list. Yellow background denotes an electorate win by a list member, or other incumbent. A ✓ or ✗ denotes status of any incumbent, win or lose respectively.						
Party	Candidate	Votes	%	±%	Party votes	%	±%
CDU	✓ Annette Widmann-Mauz	55,188	38.9	▼4.0	43,603	30.7	▼4.6
Greens	Winfried Hermann	30,560	21.6	▲11.8	26,939	19.0	▲2.8
SPD	Martin Rosemann	28,501	20.1	▼18.1	26,823	18.9	▼10.2
FDP	Klaus Bucher	13,680	9.7	▲5.9	24,233	17.1	▲5.8
Left	Heike Hänsel	9,801	6.9	▲3.6	11,185	7.9	▲3.6
Pirates					3,648	2.6	
NPD	Edda Schmidt	2,078	1.5	0.0	1,452	1.0	▲0.1
REP					1,122	0.8	▼0.5
Independent	Stefan Schade	1,075	0.8				
Tierschutzpartei					870	0.6	
ÖDP	Matthias Dietrich	814	0.6		633	0.4	
PBC					525	0.4	▼0.2
Volksabstimmung					372	0.3	
DIE VIOLETTEN					318	0.2	
MLPD					140	0.1	0.0
DVU					73	0.1	
BüSo					63	0.0	0.0
ADM					42	0.0	
Informal votes		2,199			1,855		
Total valid votes		141,697			142,041		
Turnout		143,896	75.9	▼5.0			
CDU hold	Majority	24,628	17.3	▲12.6			

=== 2005 election ===
Federal election (2005):Tübingen
Notes:	Blue background denotes the winner of the electorate vote. Pink background denotes a candidate elected from their party list. Yellow background denotes an electorate win by a list member, or other incumbent. A ✓ or ✗ denotes status of any incumbent, win or lose respectively.						
Party	Candidate	Votes	%	±%	Party votes	%	±%
CDU	✓ Annette Widmann-Mauz	62,391	42.9	▼0.5	51,392	35.3	▼4.1
SPD	Herta Däubler-Gmelin	55,513	38.2	▼2.2	42,318	29.1	▼3.7
Greens	Winfried Hermann	14,219	9.8	▼0.5	23,612	16.2	▲1.0
FDP	Matthias Linckersdorff	5,446	3.7	▼1.0	16,382	11.2	▲4.1
Left	Heike Hänsel	4,759	3.3	▲2.0	6,209	4.3	▲2.8
NPD	Edda Schmidt	2,147	1.5		1,390	1.0	▲0.7
REP					1,864	1.3	▼0.1
Familie					938	0.6	
Independent	Reinhart Mann	875	0.6				
PBC					761	0.5	▲0.1
GRAUEN					505	0.3	▲0.2
MLPD					140	0.1	
BüSo					114	0.1	▲0.1
Informal votes		2,661			2,386		
Total valid votes		145,350			145,625		
Turnout		140,011	80.9	▼2.2			
CDU hold	Majority	6,878	4.7				
