= Ulm (electoral district) =

Federal electoral district of Germany

291 Ulm
- Electoral district for the Bundestag
- Ulm in 2025
- State: Baden-Württemberg
- Population: 323,900 (2019)
- Electorate: 223,376 (2021)
- Major settlements: Ulm; Ehingen; Langenau
- Area: 1,477.2 km^{2}

Current electoral district
- Created: 1949
- Party: CDU
- Member: Vacant

Ulm is an electoral constituency (German: Wahlkreis) represented in the Bundestag. It elects one member via first-past-the-post voting. Under the current constituency numbering system, it is designated as constituency 291. It is located in eastern Baden-Württemberg, comprising the city of Ulm and the district of Alb-Donau-Kreis.

Ulm was created for the inaugural 1949 federal election. From 2017 to 2026, it was represented by Ronja Kemmer of the Christian Democratic Union (CDU).

== Geography ==
Ulm is located in eastern Baden-Württemberg. As of the 2021 federal election, it comprises the independent city of Ulm and the district of Alb-Donau-Kreis.

== History ==
Ulm was created in 1949. In the 1949 election, it was Württemberg-Baden Landesbezirk Württemberg constituency 8 in the numbering system. In the 1953 through 1961 elections, it was number 170. In the 1965 through 1976 elections, it was number 173. In the 1980 through 1998 elections, it was number 195. In the 2002 and 2005 elections, it was number 292. Since the 2009 election, it has been number 291.

Originally, the constituency comprised the independent city of Ulm and the districts of Landkreis Ulm and Heidenheim. In the 1965 through 1976 elections, it comprised the city of Ulm and the Landkreis Ulm district. It acquired its current borders in the 1980 election.

Election	No.	Name	Borders
1949	8	Ulm	Ulm city; Landkreis Ulm district; Heidenheim district
1953	170	Ulm	Ulm city; Landkreis Ulm district; Heidenheim district
1957	170	Ulm	Ulm city; Landkreis Ulm district; Heidenheim district
1961	170	Ulm	Ulm city; Landkreis Ulm district; Heidenheim district
1965	173	Ulm	Ulm city; Landkreis Ulm district
1969	173	Ulm	Ulm city; Landkreis Ulm district
1972	173	Ulm	Ulm city; Landkreis Ulm district
1976	173	Ulm	Ulm city; Landkreis Ulm district
1980	195	Ulm	Ulm city; Alb-Donau-Kreis district
1983	195	Ulm	Ulm city; Alb-Donau-Kreis district
1987	195	Ulm	Ulm city; Alb-Donau-Kreis district
1990	195	Ulm	Ulm city; Alb-Donau-Kreis district
1994	195	Ulm	Ulm city; Alb-Donau-Kreis district
1998	195	Ulm	Ulm city; Alb-Donau-Kreis district
2002	292	Ulm	Ulm city; Alb-Donau-Kreis district
2005	292	Ulm	Ulm city; Alb-Donau-Kreis district
2009	291	Ulm	Ulm city; Alb-Donau-Kreis district
2013	291	Ulm	Ulm city; Alb-Donau-Kreis district
2017	291	Ulm	Ulm city; Alb-Donau-Kreis district
2021	291	Ulm	Ulm city; Alb-Donau-Kreis district
2025	291	Ulm	Ulm city; Alb-Donau-Kreis district

== Members ==
The constituency has been held continuously by Christian Democratic Union (CDU) since its creation. It was first represented by Ludwig Erhard from 1949 to 1972. Erhard served as Chancellor from 1963 to 1966. Herbert Werner served as representative from 1972 to 1994, followed by Heinz Seiffert 1994 to 2002. Annette Schavan then served from 2002 to 2017. Ronja Kemmer was elected in 2017 and re-elected in 2021.

Election	Member	Party	%
1949	Ludwig Erhard	CDU	40.1
1953	Ludwig Erhard	CDU	60.6
1957	Ludwig Erhard	CDU	58.4
1961	Ludwig Erhard	CDU	53.2
1965	Ludwig Erhard	CDU	58.2
1969	Ludwig Erhard	CDU	53.1
1972	Herbert Werner	CDU	51.0
1976	Herbert Werner	CDU	52.5
1980	Herbert Werner	CDU	53.7
1983	Herbert Werner	CDU	61.5
1987	Herbert Werner	CDU	54.1
1990	Herbert Werner	CDU	51.3
1994	Heinz Seiffert	CDU	50.8
1998	Heinz Seiffert	CDU	46.6
2002	Heinz Seiffert	CDU	51.7
2005	Annette Schavan	CDU	48.7
2009	Annette Schavan	CDU	42.8
2013	Annette Schavan	CDU	52.1
2017	Ronja Kemmer	CDU	42.7
2021	Ronja Kemmer	CDU	32.7
2025	Ronja Kemmer	CDU	38.8
2026	Vacant		

== Election results ==
=== 2025 election ===
Federal election (2025): Ulm
Notes:	Blue background denotes the winner of the electorate vote. Pink background denotes a candidate elected from their party list. Yellow background denotes an electorate win by a list member, or other incumbent. A ✓ or ✗ denotes status of any incumbent, win or lose respectively.						
Party	Candidate	Votes	%	±%	Party votes	%	±%
CDU	✓ Ronja Kemmer	73,229	38.8	▲6.1	64,118	33.9	▲7.3
AfD	Daniel Rottmann	34,984	18.5	▲9.5	36,440	19.3	▲10.2
Greens	Marcel Emmerich	29,343	15.5	▼3.2	25,669	13.6	▼4.2
SPD	Sebastian Gillmeister	25,216	13.4	▼4.9	25,474	13.5	▼7.2
Left	Leopold Hurst	9,376	5.0	▲2.4	12,210	6.5	▲3.4
BSW					7,377	3.9	
FDP	Anke Hillmann-Richter	6,700	3.5	▼7.7	9,748	5.2	▼9.3
FW	Thomas Walcher	3,799	2.0	▼0.8	2,556	1.4	▼0.8
Tierschutzpartei	Bastian Röhm	2,962	1.6	▼0.3	1,751	0.9	▼0.5
Volt	Michael Bauersfeld	1,717	0.9		1,289	0.7	▲0.4
BD	Manfred Spähn	1,226	0.6		439	0.2	
PARTEI				▼1.1	737	0.4	▼0.5
dieBasis					530	0.3	▼1.2
ÖDP					409	0.2	▼0.1
Bündnis C					297	0.2	Steady
MLPD	Gisela Schwalb	218	0.1	0.0	76	0.0	0.0
Pirates				▼0.9			▼0.5
Team Todenhöfer							▼0.5
Humanists	Andreas Steinau			▼0.3			▼0.2
Gesundheitsforschung							▼0.1
Informal votes		1,539			1,372		
Total valid votes		175,998			176,165		
Turnout		177,537	79.5	▼0.2			
CDU hold	Majority	38,245	20.3	▲2.9			

=== 2021 election ===
Federal election (2021): Ulm
Notes:	Blue background denotes the winner of the electorate vote. Pink background denotes a candidate elected from their party list. Yellow background denotes an electorate win by a list member, or other incumbent. A ✓ or ✗ denotes status of any incumbent, win or lose respectively.						
Party	Candidate	Votes	%	±%	Party votes	%	±%
CDU	✓ Ronja Kemmer	57,608	32.7	▼9.9	46,805	26.6	▼10.4
Greens	Marcel Emmerich	33,012	18.8	▲6.8	31,238	17.7	▲4.0
SPD	Jan Rothenbacher	32,176	18.3	▼1.9	36,418	20.7	▲4.8
FDP	Alexander Kulitz	19,745	11.2	▲3.1	25,389	14.4	▲2.9
AfD	Kristoff Heitmann	15,932	9.1	▼1.6	16,046	9.1	▼2.5
FW	Oliver Lang	4,961	2.8		3,808	2.2	▲1.4
Left	David Rizzotto	4,604	2.6	▼2.0	5,377	3.1	▼2.6
dieBasis					2,566	1.5	
Tierschutzpartei	Miriam Broux	3,303	1.9		2,491	1.4	▲0.6
PARTEI	Paul Eberhardt	2,002	1.1		1,529	0.9	▲0.2
Pirates	Anja Hirschel	1,669	0.9	▼0.7	914	0.5	▼0.1
Team Todenhöfer					820	0.5	
Volt					552	0.3	
ÖDP					515	0.3	▼0.1
Bündnis C					353	0.2	
Humanists	Andreas Steinau	481	0.3		310	0.2	
KlimalisteBW	Daniel Wagner	369	0.2				
Gesundheitsforschung					252	0.1	
Bürgerbewegung					212	0.1	
NPD					173	0.1	▼0.2
DiB					143	0.1	▼0.1
MLPD	Gülay Öztoprak	136	0.1	▼0.1	87	0.0	0.0
Bündnis 21					68	0.0	
LKR					63	0.0	
DKP					36	0.0	0.0
Informal votes		1,539			1,372		
Total valid votes		175,998			176,165		
Turnout		177,537	79.5	▼0.2			
CDU hold	Majority	24,596	13.9	▼8.6			

=== 2017 election ===
Federal election (2017): Ulm
Notes:	Blue background denotes the winner of the electorate vote. Pink background denotes a candidate elected from their party list. Yellow background denotes an electorate win by a list member, or other incumbent. A ✓ or ✗ denotes status of any incumbent, win or lose respectively.						
Party	Candidate	Votes	%	±%	Party votes	%	±%
CDU	Ronja Kemmer	74,849	42.7	▼9.4	64,988	37.0	▼11.6
SPD	Hilde Mattheis	35,456	20.2	▼3.6	27,889	15.9	▼4.3
Greens	Marcel Emmerich	20,990	12.0	▲2.2	24,160	13.7	▲3.5
AfD	Eugen Ciresa	18,734	10.7	▲7.0	20,432	11.6	▲6.9
FDP	Alexander Kulitz	14,173	8.1	▲5.4	20,277	11.5	▲6.3
Left	Eva-Maria Glathe-Braun	8,105	4.6	▲1.0	9,976	5.7	▲1.4
Tierschutzpartei					1,412	0.8	▲0.1
FW					1,275	0.7	0.0
PARTEI					1,258	0.7	
Pirates	Anja Hirschel	2,837	1.6	▼1.0	1,048	0.6	▼1.9
ÖDP					672	0.4	▼0.1
NPD					499	0.3	▼0.8
Tierschutzallianz					385	0.2	
DM					370	0.2	
BGE					309	0.2	
DiB					274	0.2	
V-Partei³					257	0.1	
Menschliche Welt					217	0.1	
MLPD	Gülay Öztoprak	300	0.2		102	0.1	0.0
DIE RECHTE					44	0.0	
DKP					19	0.0	
Informal votes		2,016			1,597		
Total valid votes		175,444			175,863		
Turnout		177,460	79.7	▲3.9			
CDU hold	Majority	39,393	22.5	▼5.8			

=== 2013 election ===
Federal election (2013): Ulm
Notes:	Blue background denotes the winner of the electorate vote. Pink background denotes a candidate elected from their party list. Yellow background denotes an electorate win by a list member, or other incumbent. A ✓ or ✗ denotes status of any incumbent, win or lose respectively.						
Party	Candidate	Votes	%	±%	Party votes	%	±%
CDU	✓ Annette Schavan	85,984	52.1	▲9.3	80,370	48.6	▲12.6
SPD	Hilde Mattheis	39,321	23.8	▲1.2	33,432	20.2	▲2.3
Greens	Annette Weinreich	16,041	9.7	▼3.8	17,023	10.3	▼4.1
Left	Eva-Maria Glathe-Braun	6,012	3.6	▼2.4	7,087	4.3	▼2.4
AfD	Werner Otto Greipel	5,989	3.6		7,839	4.7	
FDP	Frank Berger	4,371	2.6	▼8.9	8,662	5.2	▼12.8
Pirates	Lisa Collins	4,320	2.6		4,075	2.5	▼0.2
NPD					1,747	1.1	▼0.1
Tierschutzpartei					1,158	0.7	0.0
FW	Horst Dürr	1,660	1.0		1,147	0.7	
Independent	Andreas Beier	1,348	0.8				
ÖDP					724	0.4	▼0.1
REP					553	0.3	▼0.4
RENTNER					422	0.3	
PBC					344	0.2	▼0.2
Volksabstimmung					342	0.2	▼0.1
PRO					147	0.1	
Party of Reason					141	0.1	
MLPD					114	0.1	0.0
BIG					95	0.1	
BüSo					46	0.0	0.0
Informal votes		2,153			1,731		
Total valid votes		165,046			165,468		
Turnout		167,199	75.8	▲1.9			
CDU hold	Majority	46,663	28.3	▲8.1			

=== 2009 election ===
Federal election (2009): Ulm
Notes:	Blue background denotes the winner of the electorate vote. Pink background denotes a candidate elected from their party list. Yellow background denotes an electorate win by a list member, or other incumbent. A ✓ or ✗ denotes status of any incumbent, win or lose respectively.						
Party	Candidate	Votes	%	±%	Party votes	%	±%
CDU	✓ Annette Schavan	67,798	42.8	▼5.9	57,158	35.9	▼6.1
SPD	Hilde Mattheis	35,875	22.6	▼10.3	28,426	17.9	▼10.8
Greens	Brigitte Schmid	21,477	13.6	▲6.0	22,889	14.4	▲3.8
FDP	Uli Walter	18,273	11.5	▲6.4	28,708	18.0	▲6.7
Left	Walter Schmid	9,605	6.1	▲3.2	10,644	6.7	▲3.4
Pirates					4,306	2.7	
NPD	Alexander Neidlein	2,510	1.6	▼0.1	1,792	1.1	▼0.1
Independent	Andreas Beier	2,329	1.5				
REP					1,210	0.8	▼0.2
Tierschutzpartei					1,087	0.7	
ÖDP					859	0.5	
PBC					646	0.4	▼0.1
Volksabstimmung					525	0.3	
DIE VIOLETTEN					392	0.2	
MLPD	Joachim Struzyna	309	0.2		161	0.1	0.0
Independent	Friedrich Schönbeck	229	0.1				
DVU					130	0.1	
BüSo					97	0.1	0.0
ADM					77	0.0	
Informal votes		3,268			2,566		
Total valid votes		158,405			159,107		
Turnout		161,673	73.9	▼6.1			
CDU hold	Majority	31,923	20.2	▲4.4			

=== 2005 election ===
Federal election (2005):Ulm
Notes:	Blue background denotes the winner of the electorate vote. Pink background denotes a candidate elected from their party list. Yellow background denotes an electorate win by a list member, or other incumbent. A ✓ or ✗ denotes status of any incumbent, win or lose respectively.						
Party	Candidate	Votes	%	±%	Party votes	%	±%
CDU	Annette Schavan	82,007	48.7	▼2.9	70,893	42.0	▼4.5
SPD	Hildegard Mattheis	55,352	32.9	▼1.1	48,274	28.6	▼2.8
Greens	Brigitte Schmid	12,635	7.5	▼0.4	17,803	10.6	▼0.4
FDP	Peter Kuhn	8,591	5.1	▲0.6	19,059	11.3	▲4.5
Left	Folker Dutzmann	4,826	2.9	▲1.8	5,495	3.3	▲2.4
NPD	Ramona Kreller	2,770	1.6		2,117	1.3	▲1.0
Independent	Andreas Beier	2,067	1.2				
REP					2,660	1.0	▼0.1
Familie					1,384	0.8	
PBC					846	0.5	▲0.2
GRAUEN					758	0.4	▲0.3
MLPD					153	0.1	▲0.1
BüSo					201	0.1	
Informal votes		3,682			3,287		
Total valid votes		168,248			168,643		
Turnout		171,930	80.0	▼2.5			
CDU hold	Majority	26,655	15.8				

Bundestag
Preceded by Bonn	Constituency represented by the chancellor 1963-1966	Vacant Extraparliamentary (1966-1969); party list from NRW (1969-1974) Title next held by Hamburg-Bergedorf
