= Axel Müller (politician) =

German politician

Axel Müller MdB
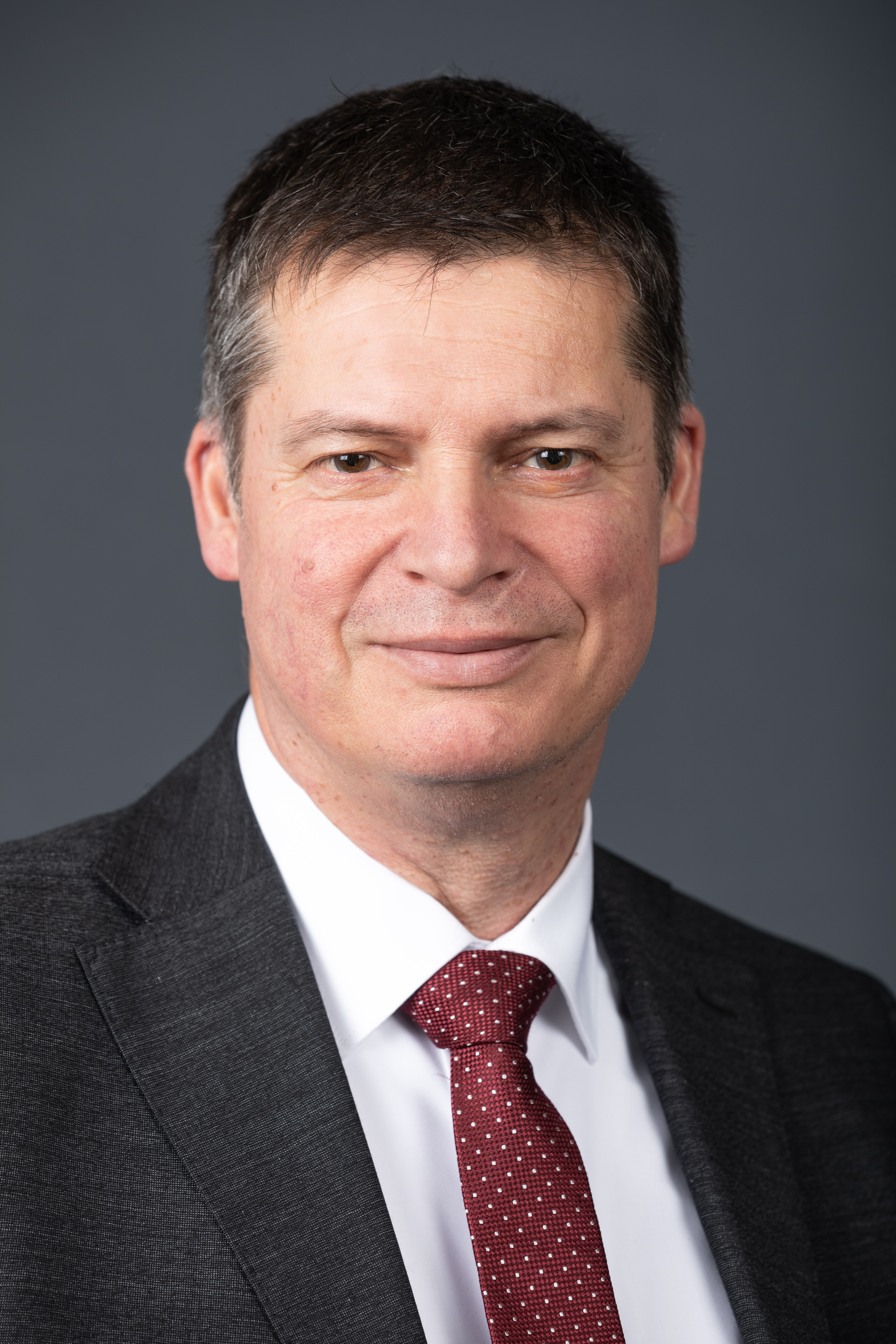
- Müller in 2020

Member of the Bundestag; for Ravensburg
- Incumbent
- Assumed office 24 October 2017
- Preceded by: Ronja Kemmer

Personal details
- Born: 24 July 1963 (age 63) Esslingen am Neckar, West Germany
- Party: Christian Democratic Union
- Education: University of Tübingen

Axel Müller (born 24 July 1963) is a German judge and politician of the Christian Democratic Union (CDU) who has been serving as a member of the Bundestag from the state of Baden-Württemberg since 2017. He represents Ravensburg.

== Political career ==
Müller became member of the Bundestag after the 2017 German federal election. In parliament, he is a member of the Committee on European Union Affairs; the Committee on Legal Affairs and Consumer Protection; the Committee on Internal Affairs; and the Committee for the Scrutiny of Acoustic Surveillance of the Private Home.
