= Christoph Naser =

German politician (born 1991)

Christoph Naser MdB

Member of the Bundestag; for Tübingen
- Incumbent
- Assumed office 27 May 2026
- Preceded by: Ronja Kemmer

Personal details
- Born: 29 July 1991 (age 35) Schwäbisch Hall, Germany
- Party: Christian Democratic Union (since 2011)
- Children: 2
- Education: University of Tübingen; Hebrew University of Jerusalem; Humboldt University of Berlin

Christoph Naser (born 29 July 1991) is a German politician of the Christian Democratic Union who has been serving as a member of the Bundestag since 2026.

== Early life and education ==
Naser grew up in Schwäbisch Hall and obtained his Abitur in 2011. He subsequently completed a one-year development-policy volunteer service with the German Society for International Cooperation (GIZ) in Laos.

From 2012 to 2020, he studied Protestant theology and political science at the University of Tübingen, the Hebrew University of Jerusalem and Humboldt University of Berlin. He completed his studies with the ecclesiastical examination and a Bachelor of Arts degree. During his studies, he was a scholarship holder of the Konrad Adenauer Foundation.

== Early career ==
From 2016 to 2023, Naser worked in the parliamentary office of Annette Widmann-Mauz.

From 2023 to 2025, Naser served as a vicar in a parish in Tübingen. From 2025 until his entry into the parliament in May 2026, he worked as a Protestant pastor.

== Political career ==
Naser joined the Christian Democratic Union (CDU) in 2011 and the Junge Union in 2017. He has served as chairman of the CDU local chapter of Tübingen since 2021. Since 2025, he has also been a member of the state executive board of the CDU in Baden-Württemberg, under the leadership of Manuel Hagel.

Following the resignation of Ronja Kemmer from the German Parliament, Naser entered parliament as her successor in May 2026.

In parliament, Naser serves on the Committee on Education, Family Affairs, Senior Citizens, Women and Youth and the Committee on Economic Cooperation and Development.

== Other activities ==
- Friedrich Miescher Laboratory of the Max Planck Society, Member of the Board of Trustees (since 2026)
- Max Planck Institute for Biology, Member of the Board of Trustees (since 2026)
- Max Planck Institute for Biological Cybernetics, Member of the Board of Trustees (since 2026)
- German Institute for Medical Mission (DIFÄM), Member of the General Assembly (since 2025)

== Personal life ==
Naser is married and has two children.
