= Ravensburg (Bundestag electoral district) =

Federal electoral district of Germany

294 Ravensburg
- Former electoral district for the Bundestag
- Ravensburg in 2025
- State: Baden-Württemberg
- Population: 256,200 (2019)
- Electorate: 187,817 (2021)
- Major settlements: Ravensburg; Wangen im Allgäu; Weingarten
- Area: 1,293.5 km^{2}

Former electoral district
- Created: 1949; 2009 (re-established)
- Abolished: 1980
- Party: CDU
- Member: Axel Müller
- Elected: 2017, 2021, 2025

Ravensburg is an electoral constituency (German: Wahlkreis) represented in the Bundestag. It elects one member via first-past-the-post voting. Under the current constituency numbering system, it is designated as constituency 294. It is located in southeastern Baden-Württemberg, comprising most of the district of Ravensburg.

Ravensburg was created for the inaugural 1949 federal election. It was abolished in 1980 and re-established in the 2009 federal election. Since 2017, it has been represented by Axel Müller of the Christian Democratic Union (CDU).

== Geography ==
Ravensburg is located in southeastern Baden-Württemberg. As of the 2021 federal election, it comprises the district of Ravensburg excluding the municipalities of Aichstetten, Aitrach, Bad Wurzach, Kißlegg.

== History ==
Ravensburg was created in 1949. In the 1949 election, it was Württemberg-Hohenzollern constituency 6 in the numbering system. In the 1953 through 1961 elections, it was number 195. In the 1965 through 1976 elections, it was number 199. Originally, the constituency comprised the districts of Ravensburg, Wangen, and Tettnang. In the 1965 through 1976 elections, it also contained the municipality of Achberg from the Sigmaringen district and the Adelsreute municipality from the Überlingen district.

Ravensburg was abolished in the 1980 election. Its area was divided between the new constituency of Ravensburg – Bodensee and the redistributed constituency of Biberach.

Ravensburg was re-established in the 2009 election. Its constituency number and borders have not changed since its re-establishment.

Election	No.	Name	Borders
1949	6	Ravensburg	Ravensburg district; Wangen district; Tettnang district
1953	195	Ravensburg	Ravensburg district; Wangen district; Tettnang district
1957	195	Ravensburg	Ravensburg district; Wangen district; Tettnang district
1961	195	Ravensburg	Ravensburg district; Wangen district; Tettnang district
1965	199	Ravensburg	Ravensburg district; Wangen district; Tettnang district; Sigmaringen district (only Achberg municipality); Überlingen district (only Adelsreute municipality)
1969	199	Ravensburg	Ravensburg district; Wangen district; Tettnang district; Sigmaringen district (only Achberg municipality); Überlingen district (only Adelsreute municipality)
1972	199	Ravensburg	Ravensburg district; Wangen district; Tettnang district; Sigmaringen district (only Achberg municipality); Überlingen district (only Adelsreute municipality)
1976	199	Ravensburg	Ravensburg district; Wangen district; Tettnang district; Sigmaringen district (only Achberg municipality); Überlingen district (only Adelsreute municipality)
1980	Abolished		
1983	Abolished		
1987	Abolished		
1990	Abolished		
1994	Abolished		
1998	Abolished		
2002	Abolished		
2005	Abolished		
2009	294	Ravensburg	Ravensburg district (excluding Aichstetten, Aitrach, Bad Wurzach, Kißlegg municipalities)
2013	294	Ravensburg	Ravensburg district (excluding Aichstetten, Aitrach, Bad Wurzach, Kißlegg municipalities)
2017	294	Ravensburg	Ravensburg district (excluding Aichstetten, Aitrach, Bad Wurzach, Kißlegg municipalities)
2021	294	Ravensburg	Ravensburg district (excluding Aichstetten, Aitrach, Bad Wurzach, Kißlegg municipalities)
2025	294	Ravensburg	Ravensburg district (excluding Aichstetten, Aitrach, Bad Wurzach, Kißlegg municipalities)

== Members ==
The constituency has been held continuously by the Christian Democratic Union (CDU) throughout both its incarnations. It was first represented by Kurt Georg Kiesinger from 1949 to 1961, followed by Eduard Adorno from 1961 to 1972. Claus Jäger was representative from 1972 until the constituency's abolition in 1980. After its re-establishment, it was represented by Andreas Schockenhoff from 2009 until his death in 2014. Axel Müller was elected in 2017.

Election	Member	Party	%
1949	Kurt Georg Kiesinger	CDU	75.3
1953	Kurt Georg Kiesinger	CDU	76.3
1957	Kurt Georg Kiesinger	CDU	75.3
1961	Eduard Adorno	CDU	66.8
1965	Eduard Adorno	CDU	66.1
1969	Eduard Adorno	CDU	66.2
1972	Claus Jäger	CDU	64.3
1976	Claus Jäger	CDU	66.9
Abolished (1980–2009)
2009	Andreas Schockenhoff	CDU	44.8
2013	Andreas Schockenhoff	CDU	51.6
2017	Axel Müller	CDU	38.5
2013	Axel Müller	CDU	30.6
2025	Axel Müller	CDU	38.7

== Election results ==
=== 2025 election ===
Federal election (2025): Ravensburg
Notes:	Blue background denotes the winner of the electorate vote. Pink background denotes a candidate elected from their party list. Yellow background denotes an electorate win by a list member, or other incumbent. A ✓ or ✗ denotes status of any incumbent, win or lose respectively.						
Party	Candidate	Votes	%	±%	Party votes	%	±%
CDU	✓ Axel Müller	60,700	38.7	▲8.2	55,057	35.0	▲8.3
AfD	Christoph Högel	29,160	18.6	▲10.6	29,900	19.0	▲10.4
Greens	Agnieszka Brugger	23,870	15.2	▼5.8	20,841	13.3	▼4.2
SPD	Heike Engelhardt	17,209	11.0	▼2.8	18,446	11.7	▼7.3
Left	Moritz Fischinger	9,809	6.3	▲3.3	10,188	6.5	▲3.2
FDP	Benjamin Strasser	8,948	5.7	▼8.6	8,525	5.4	▼9.5
BSW					6,518	4.1	
FW	Niclas Bulling	4,667	3.0	▼0.1	2,667	1.7	▼0.9
Volt	Laurin Brinkmann	2,410	1.5		1,308	0.8	▲0.5
Tierschutzpartei					1,232	0.8	▼0.3
dieBasis				▼3.2	730	0.5	▼2.4
PARTEI				▼1.3	716	0.5	▼0.5
ÖDP				▼1.3	623	0.4	▼0.4
Bündnis C					270	0.2	0.0
BD					169	0.1	
MLPD				▼0.1	46	0.0	0.0
Team Todenhöfer							▼0.4
Pirates							▼0.4
Menschliche Welt				▼0.2			
Gesundheitsforschung							▼0.1
Humanists							▼0.1
Informal votes		1,224			761		
Total valid votes		156,773			157,236		
Turnout		157,997	83.9	▲5.7			
CDU hold	Majority	31,540	20.1				

=== 2021 election ===
Federal election (2021): Ravensburg
Notes:	Blue background denotes the winner of the electorate vote. Pink background denotes a candidate elected from their party list. Yellow background denotes an electorate win by a list member, or other incumbent. A ✓ or ✗ denotes status of any incumbent, win or lose respectively.						
Party	Candidate	Votes	%	±%	Party votes	%	±%
CDU	✓ Axel Müller	44,597	30.6	▼8.0	38,927	26.7	▼12.2
Greens	Agnieszka Brugger	30,743	21.1	▲0.9	25,536	17.5	▲2.5
FDP	Benjamin Strasser	20,934	14.3	▲4.2	21,740	14.9	▲3.5
SPD	Heike Engelhardt	20,128	13.8	▲1.4	27,750	19.0	▲5.6
AfD	Christoph Högel	11,727	8.0	▼1.4	12,650	8.7	▼1.6
dieBasis	Julian Aicher	4,710	3.2		4,156	2.8	
FW	Günter Ruchti	4,441	3.0	▲1.6	3,751	2.6	▲1.7
Left	Jasmin Runge	4,365	3.0	▼2.4	4,735	3.2	▼2.9
Tierschutzpartei					1,604	1.1	▲0.4
PARTEI	Lukas Rein	1,913	1.3		1,373	0.9	▲0.4
ÖDP	Siegfried Scharpf	1,904	1.3	▼0.4	1,091	0.7	▼0.4
Team Todenhöfer					570	0.4	
Pirates					536	0.4	0.0
Volt					445	0.3	
Menschliche Welt	Sona Pietsch	351	0.2	▼0.2			
Bündnis C					238	0.2	
Bürgerbewegung					183	0.1	
DiB					163	0.1	0.0
Gesundheitsforschung					160	0.1	
Humanists					121	0.1	
NPD					93	0.1	▼0.1
Bündnis 21					48	0.0	
MLPD	Karl-Heinz Pauli	127	0.1	0.0	46	0.0	0.0
LKR					44	0.0	
DKP					18	0.0	0.0
Informal votes		1,080			1,042		
Total valid votes		145,940			145,978		
Turnout		147,020	78.3	▲0.1			
CDU hold	Majority	13,854	9.5	▼8.9			

=== 2017 election ===
Federal election (2017): Ravensburg
Notes:	Blue background denotes the winner of the electorate vote. Pink background denotes a candidate elected from their party list. Yellow background denotes an electorate win by a list member, or other incumbent. A ✓ or ✗ denotes status of any incumbent, win or lose respectively.						
Party	Candidate	Votes	%	±%	Party votes	%	±%
CDU	Axel Müller	55,758	38.5	▼13.1	56,264	38.9	▼11.1
Greens	Agnieszka Brugger	29,216	20.2	▲6.6	21,770	15.0	▲2.7
SPD	Heike Engelhardt	17,958	12.4	▼7.6	19,398	13.4	▼3.9
FDP	Benjamin Strasser	14,672	10.1	▲7.7	16,441	11.4	▲6.1
AfD	Helmut Dietz	13,668	9.4	▲6.7	14,901	10.3	▲6.4
Left	Jasmin Runge	7,860	5.4	▲2.1	8,889	6.1	▲1.8
ÖDP	Thomas Bergmann	2,483	1.7	▼0.4	1,618	1.1	▼0.4
FW	Klaus Wirthwein	2,085	1.4	▲0.6	1,296	0.9	▲0.2
Tierschutzpartei					1,007	0.7	0.0
PARTEI					768	0.5	
Pirates					496	0.3	▼1.8
Menschliche Welt	Sylvia Makowski	652	0.5		457	0.3	
Tierschutzallianz					289	0.2	
NPD					274	0.2	▼0.7
BGE					254	0.2	
DM					217	0.1	
Independent	Stefan Weinert	174	0.1				
DiB					167	0.1	
V-Partei³					165	0.1	
MLPD	Karl-Heinz Pauli	131	0.1		56	0.0	0.0
DIE RECHTE					41	0.0	
DKP					19	0.0	
Informal votes		1,517			1,387		
Total valid votes		144,657			144,787		
Turnout		146,174	78.2	▲4.7			
CDU hold	Majority	26,542	18.3	▼13.3			

=== 2013 election ===
Federal election (2013): Ravensburg
Notes:	Blue background denotes the winner of the electorate vote. Pink background denotes a candidate elected from their party list. Yellow background denotes an electorate win by a list member, or other incumbent. A ✓ or ✗ denotes status of any incumbent, win or lose respectively.						
Party	Candidate	Votes	%	±%	Party votes	%	±%
CDU	✓ Andreas Schockenhoff	69,312	51.6	▲6.8	67,251	50.0	▲12.4
SPD	Hannes Munzinger	26,909	20.0	▲2.3	23,266	17.3	▲1.7
Greens	Agnieszka Brugger	18,298	13.6	▼1.0	16,571	12.3	▼2.0
Left	Michael Konieczny	4,424	3.3	▼2.9	5,770	4.3	▼2.3
AfD	Bernhard Russ	3,674	2.7		5,200	3.9	
FDP	Ralf Sauer	3,320	2.5	▼11.7	7,047	5.2	▼13.5
ÖDP	Thomas Bergmann	2,782	2.1		1,982	1.5	▼0.1
Pirates	Roman Brauchle	2,761	2.1		2,837	2.1	▲0.2
NPD	Benjamin Hennes	1,252	0.9	▼0.6	1,164	0.9	▼0.1
Tierschutzpartei					951	0.7	0.0
FW	Johannes Butscher	1,192	0.9		901	0.7	
REP					418	0.3	▼0.4
Independent	Paul-Gerhard Kanis	323	0.2				
Volksabstimmung					320	0.2	▼0.1
RENTNER					297	0.2	
PBC					231	0.2	▼0.2
Party of Reason					103	0.1	
PRO					85	0.1	
MLPD					60	0.0	0.0
BIG					29	0.0	
BüSo					23	0.0	▼0.1
Informal votes		1,630			1,371		
Total valid votes		134,247			134,506		
Turnout		135,877	73.4	▲1.7			
CDU hold	Majority	42,403	31.6	▲4.5			

=== 2009 election ===
Federal election (2009): Ravensburg
Notes:	Blue background denotes the winner of the electorate vote. Pink background denotes a candidate elected from their party list. Yellow background denotes an electorate win by a list member, or other incumbent. A ✓ or ✗ denotes status of any incumbent, win or lose respectively.						
Party	Candidate	Votes	%	±%	Party votes	%	±%
CDU	Andreas Schockenhoff	56,931	44.8	▼6.2	48,146	37.6	▼7.3
SPD	Anne Jenter	22,530	17.7	▼8.4	19,969	15.6	▼9.2
Greens	Agnieszka Malczak	18,639	14.7	▲2.9	18,408	14.3	▲3.0
FDP	Marc-Ernst Oberscheid	17,946	14.1	▲8.4	23,997	18.7	▲7.0
Left	Mirco Kolarczik	7,918	6.2	▲3.4	8,428	6.6	▲3.5
Pirates					2,404	1.9	
ÖDP					1,965	1.5	
NPD	Jürgen Widder	2,006	1.6	▲0.3	1,250	1.0	▲0.2
Independent	Katharina Scheinert	1,048	0.8				
REP					944	0.7	▼0.4
Tierschutzpartei					883	0.7	
PBC					493	0.4	▼0.2
Volksabstimmung					480	0.4	
DIE VIOLETTEN					444	0.3	
ADM					115	0.1	
BüSo					86	0.1	0.0
DVU					76	0.1	
MLPD					74	0.1	0.0
Informal votes		3,110			1,966		
Total valid votes		127,018			128,162		
Turnout		130,128	71.8	▼6.2			
CDU win new seat	Majority	34,401	27.1				
