= Julian Grünke =

German politician (born 1995)

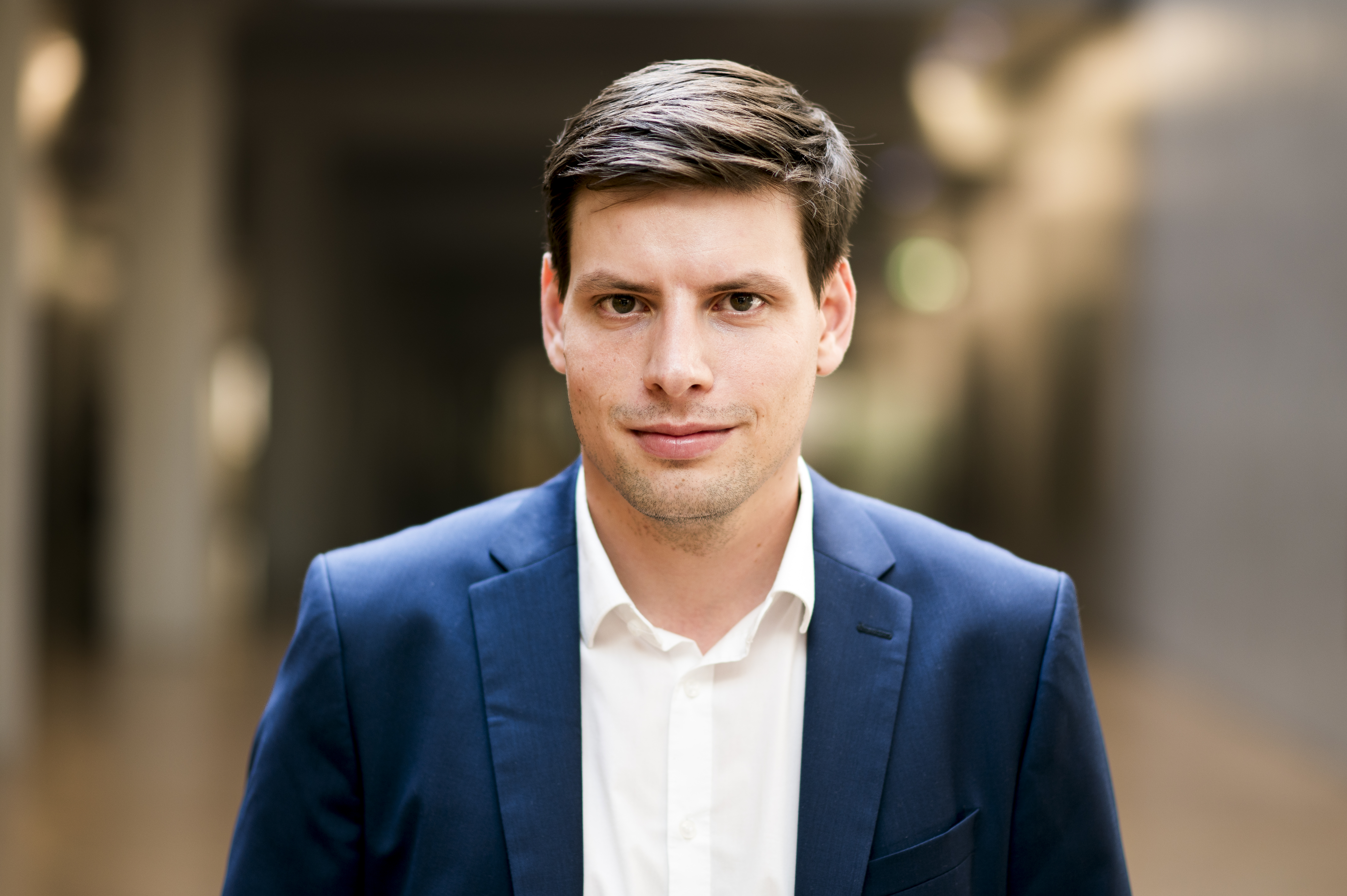
- Grünke in 2024

Member of the Bundestag
- Incumbent
- Assumed office 2 September 2024
- Preceded by: Michael Theurer

Personal details
- Born: Julian Simon Grünke; 31 July 1995 (age 31) Stuttgart, Germany
- Party: FDP
- Education: University of Tübingen

Julian Simon Grünke (born 31 August 1995) is a German politician from the Free Democratic Party (FDP) who served as a member of the Bundestag from September 2024 to Marach 2025.

== Life ==
Grünke attended the Otto-Hahn-Gymnasium Nagold from 2006 to 2011. In 2014 he graduated from the Gewerbliche Schule Nagold. From 2014 to 2016 he studied legal science and economics, but did not graduate. From 2016 to 2022 he studied political science and a minor in business economics at the Eberhard Karls University of Tübingen. He graduated with a Bachelor of Arts. From 2022 until his entry into the Bundestag in 2024 he was parliamentary assistant to the Member of the European Parliament Andreas Glück.

Grünke lives in Tübingen and is married.

== Political career ==
Grünke joined the Young Liberals and the FDP in 2017. From 2019 to 2021 he was chairman of the FDP city association in Tübingen.

Grünke ran for office in the 2021 German federal election in the Tübingen constituency, but initially missed out on a place in the Bundestag. He replaced Michael Theurer in the Bundestag on 2 September 2024. He served on the Committee on the Environment, Nature Conservation, Nuclear Safety and Consumer Protection, the Committee on Education, Research and Technology Assessment and the Committee of Inquiry into the Nuclear Phase-out.

== See also ==
- List of members of the 20th Bundestag
