= Benjamin Strasser =

German politician

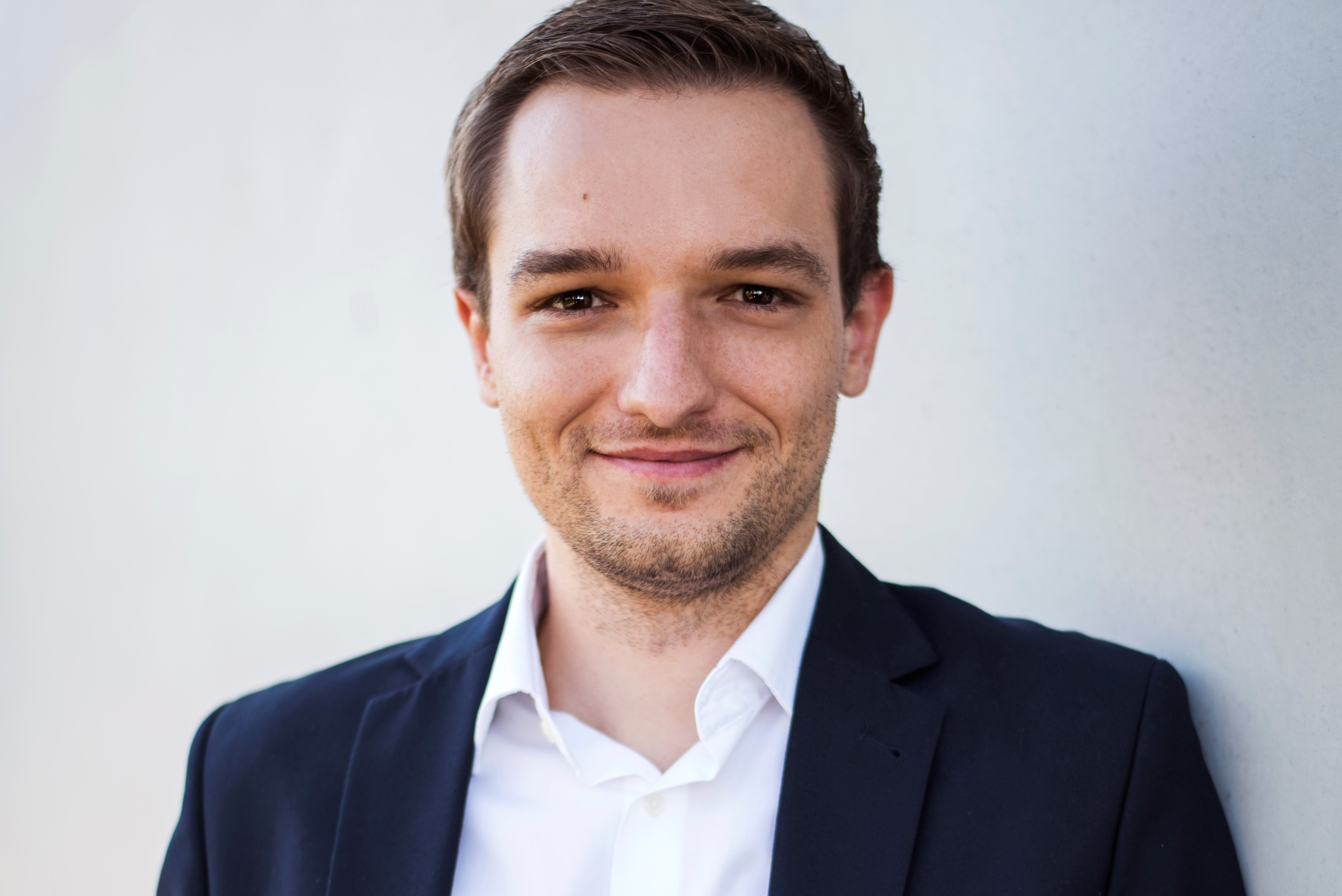
- Strasser in 2018

Member of the Bundestag
- In office 2017–2025

Personal details
- Born: 9 February 1987 (age 39) Weingarten, West Germany (now Germany)
- Party: FDP
- Education: University of Konstanz

Benjamin Strasser (born 9 February 1987) is a German lawyer and politician of the Free Democratic Party (FDP) who served as a member of the Bundestag from the state of Baden-Württemberg from 2017 to 2025, representing the Ravensburg district.

In addition to his parliamentary work, Strasser served as Parliamentary State Secretary in the Federal Ministry of Justice in the coalition government of Chancellor Olaf Scholz from 2021 to 2024.

== Early life and career ==
Strasser attended the Realschule at the St. Konrad educational centre and the Wirtschaftsgymnasium in Ravensburg. After graduating from high school, he studied law at the University of Konstanz. He completed his legal studies in 2012 with the first state examination in law.

After his legal clerkship at the Regional Court of Stuttgart, which he completed with the second state examination in 2014, Strasser worked as a parliamentary advisor to Ulrich Goll in the State Parliament of Baden-Württemberg. In this function he was also responsible for the parliament's inquiry into the National Socialist Underground (NSU). Since 2016 he has been a lawyer in Ravensburg.

== Political career ==
Strasser became a member of the Bundestag in the 2017 German federal election. He is a member of the Committee on Internal Affairs. In this capacity, he serves as his parliamentary group’s rapporteur on the emergency services, including the Federal Police, the Federal Criminal Police Office (BKA) and emergency medical services, among others. In 2020, he became his parliamentary group’s spokesperson on religion and the fight against antisemitism.

In addition to his committee assignments, Strasser co-chaired the German-Austrian Parliamentary Friendship Group and was a member of the German-Israeli Parliamentary Friendship Group.

Amid a 2020 controversy about the FDP’s relationship with the Alternative for Germany (AfD), Strasser was appointed by Christian Lindner to chair the parliamentary group’s task force on developing strategies against right-wing populism.

In the negotiations to form a so-called traffic light coalition of the Social Democratic Party (SPD), the Green Party and the FDP following the 2021 federal elections, Strasser was part of his party's delegation in the working group on homeland security, civil rights and consumer protection, co-chaired by Christine Lambrecht, Konstantin von Notz and Wolfgang Kubicki.

== Other activities ==
- German Foundation for International Legal Cooperation (IRZ), Member of the Board of Trustees (since 2022)
- Stiftung Forum Recht, Member of the Board of Trustees (since 2022)
