= Andreas Schockenhoff =

German politician

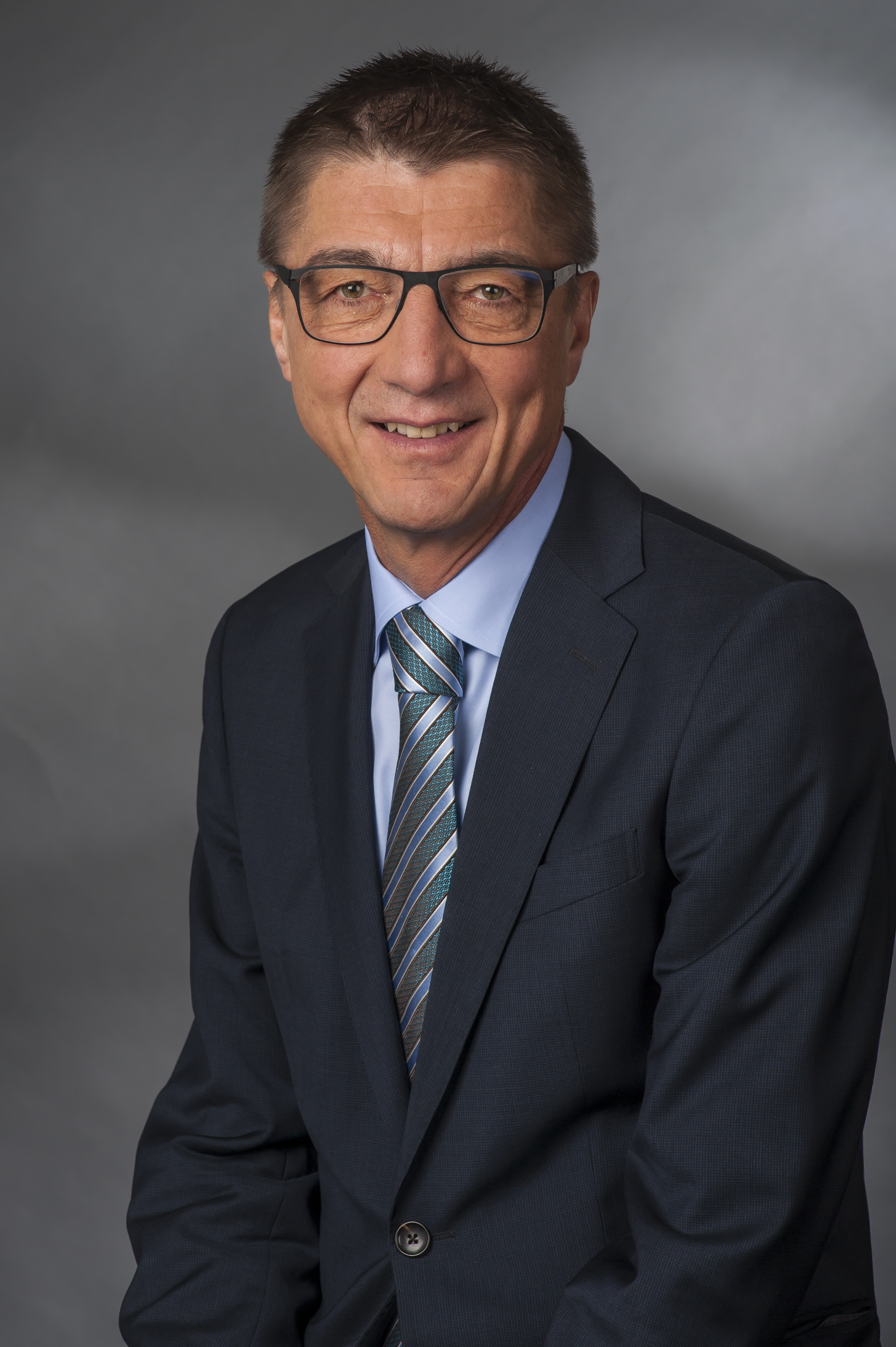
- Schockenhoff in 2014

Member of the Bundestag
- In office 20 December 1990 – 13 December 2014
- Preceded by: Elmar Kolb
- Succeeded by: Ronja Kemmer
- Constituency: Ravensburg – Bodensee (1990–2009); Ravensburg (2009–2014)

Personal details
- Born: 23 February 1957 Ludwigsburg, West Germany
- Died: 13 December 2014 (aged 57) Ravensburg, Germany
- Party: Christian Democratic Union
- Children: 3
- Education: University of Tübingen; Stendhal University

Andreas Schockenhoff (23 February 1957 – 13 December 2014) was a German politician for the CDU. From 1990 until his death in 2014, he served as a member of the German Bundestag. In the general election in 2013, he was elected the seventh consecutive year as a direct mandate for the federal electoral district Ravensburg in the German Bundestag.

From 2006 until early 2014, Schockenhoff served as coordinator for the Cabinet of Germany, and was responsible for German-Russian cooperation. As distinctive foreign policymaker he was known for his criticism of Vladimir Putin's government, and supported a more active German role in international crises.

He announced in 2011 that he was undergoing therapy for his alcohol addiction.

Schockenhoff was born in Ludwigsburg, Germany. He died in Ravensburg, Germany, aged 57 from either heart failure or heat exposure after entering a sauna. The day before his death, Schockenhoff participated in a radio show where he defended Ukraine's sovereignty and called out Rossiyskaya Gazeta's correspondent who had tried to label Russian elite troops as "insurgents."
