= Hilde Mattheis =

German politician

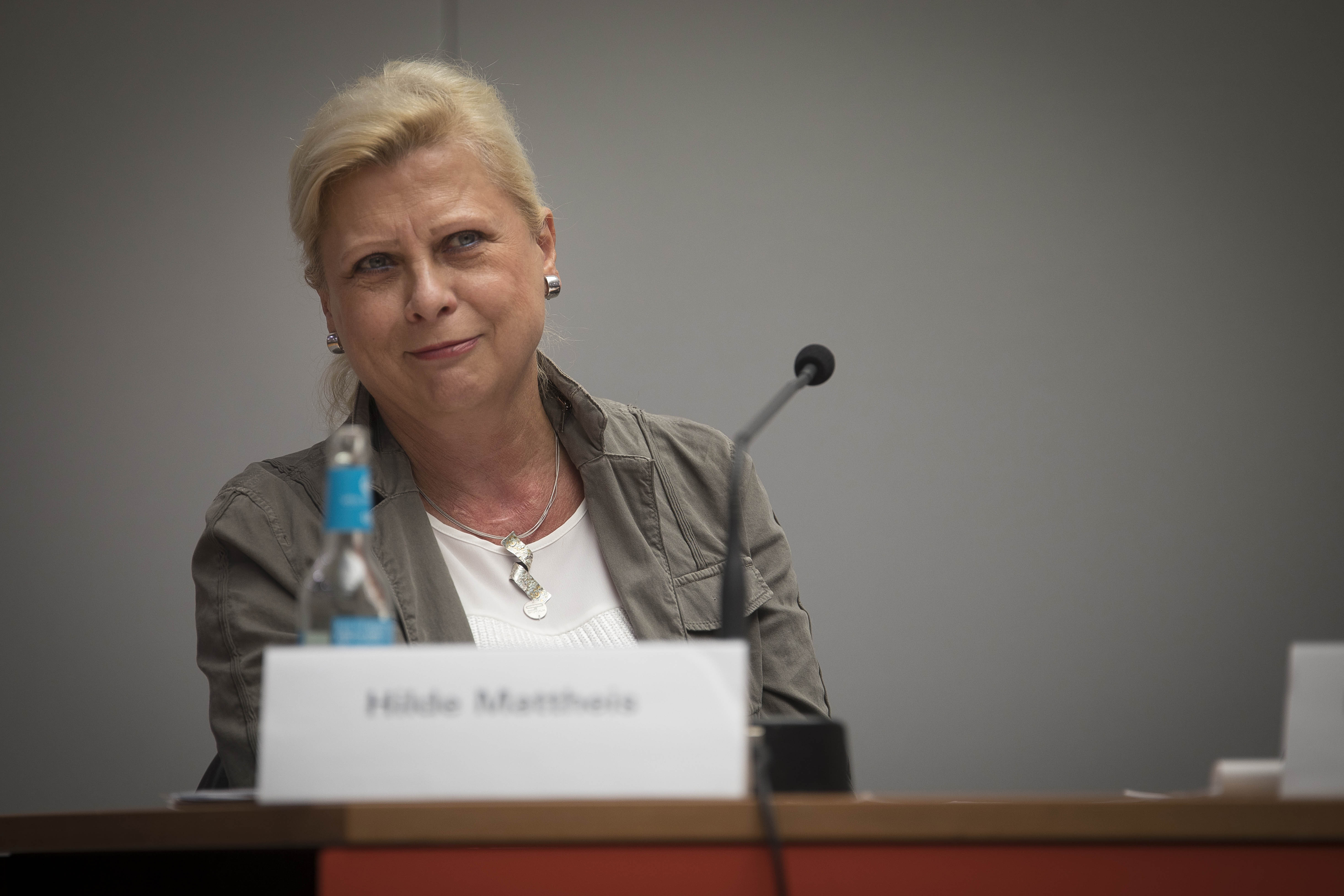

Member of the Bundestag
- In office 2002–2021

Personal details
- Born: 6 October 1954 (age 72) Finnentrop, West Germany (now Germany)
- Citizenship: German
- Party: SPD
- Children: 2

Hildegard "Hilde" Mattheis (née Gudelius, born 6 October 1954) is a German teacher and politician of the Social Democratic Party of Germany (SPD) who served as a member of the Bundestag from 2002 until 2021.

== Early life and career ==
Mattheis was born 1954 in the West German town of Finnentrop and became a teacher.

== Political career ==
Mattheis entered the SPD in 1986 and is since 1995 member of the chairmanship of her party in the state association of Baden-Württemberg.

Mattheis first became a member of the German Bundestag in the 2002 national elections, representing Ulm. Throughout her time in parliament, she served on the Committee on Health. In that capacity, she was her parliamentary group’s rapporteur on issues including elderly care and psychiatry. From 2002 until 2005, she was also a member of the Committee on Petitions.

Within the SPD parliamentary group, Mattheis belonged to the Parliamentary Left, a left-wing movement. From 2005 until 2007, she was part of the parliamentary group’s leadership around chairman Peter Struck. She was part of internal working groups on health (from 2002), migration and consumer protection (from 2019).

In 2009, Mattheis came in second only after Nils Schmid in an internal party vote on the leadership of the SPD in Baden-Württemberg; she subsequently became one of his four deputies.

In the negotiations to form a Grand Coalition of Chancellor Angela Merkel's Christian Democrats (CDU together with the Bavarian CSU) and the SPD following the 2013 federal elections, she was part of the SPD delegation in the working group on health policy, led by Jens Spahn and Karl Lauterbach. Appointed by Federal Minister of Health Hermann Gröhe, she served as member of an expert commission on the reform of Germany’s hospital care from 2015 until 2017.

Mattheis was (together with her running mate Dierk Hirschel) a candidate for the 2019 Social Democratic Party of Germany leadership election; however, she withdrew her candidacy shortly before the vote.

In July 2020, Mattheis announced that she would not stand in the 2021 federal elections but instead resign from active politics by the end of the parliamentary term.

== Other activities ==
- Workers' Samaritan Foundation Germany (ASB), Member
- Education and Science Workers' Union (GEW), Member
- German Federation for the Environment and Nature Conservation (BUND), Member
- Gegen Vergessen – Für Demokratie, Member

== Political positions ==
Mattheis was one of the most vocal opponents of her party’s decision to enter into negotiations to form a coalition government under the leadership of Chancellor Angela Merkel following the 2017 federal elections. Between 2018 and 2019, she was the one member of the SPD parliamentary group who voted most often against the party line.

== Personal life ==
Mattheis and her husband live in Ulm’s Söflingen district.
