= Eduard Adorno =

German politician

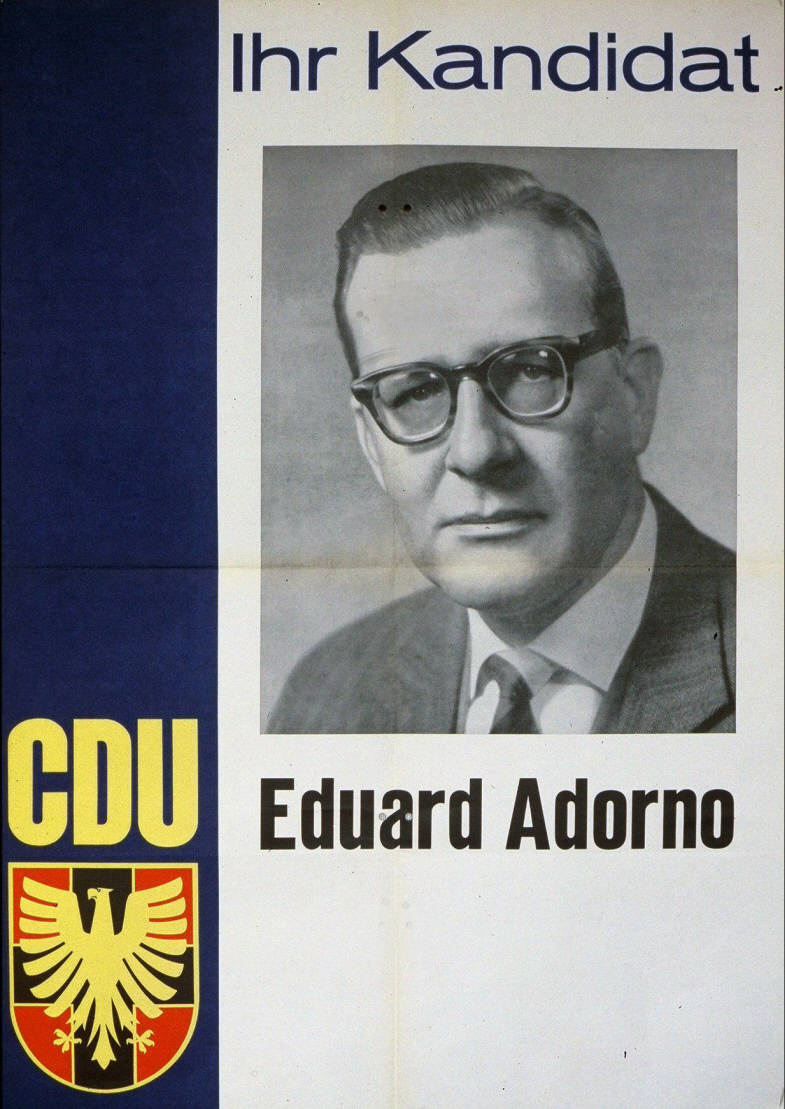
- Election poster (1961)

Member of the Bundestag; for Ravensburg
- In office 17 October 1961 – 21 August 1972
- Preceded by: Wilhelm Adam Lulay
- Succeeded by: Franz Sauter

Personal details
- Born: 31 October 1910 Munich, German Empire
- Died: 28 December 2000 (aged 90) Bad Wörishofen, Germany
- Party: Christian Democratic Union
- Education: University of Hohenheim

Eduard Adorno (31 October 1920 – 28 December 2000) was a German politician of the Christian Democratic Union (CDU) and former member of the German Bundestag.

== Life ==
In 1961 Adorno became a member of parliament for the constituency of Wangen/Tettnang/Ravensburg. He was a member of the German Bundestag from 1961 until his resignation on 21 August 1972. He always entered the Bundestag as a directly elected representative of the Ravensburg constituency. From November 1965 to 19 April 1967, Adorno was Deputy Chairman of the CDU/CSU parliamentary group in the Bundestag. On 19 April 1967 he was appointed Parliamentary State Secretary to the Federal Minister of Defence in the Federal Government led by Chancellor Kurt Georg Kiesinger.

== Literature ==
Herbst, Ludolf; Jahn, Bruno (2002). Vierhaus, Rudolf (ed.). Biographisches Handbuch der Mitglieder des Deutschen Bundestages. 1949–2002 [Biographical Handbook of the Members of the German Bundestag. 1949–2002] (in German). München: De Gruyter - De Gruyter Saur. p. 1715. ISBN 978-3-11-184511-1.
