= Michael Theurer =

German politician (born 1967)

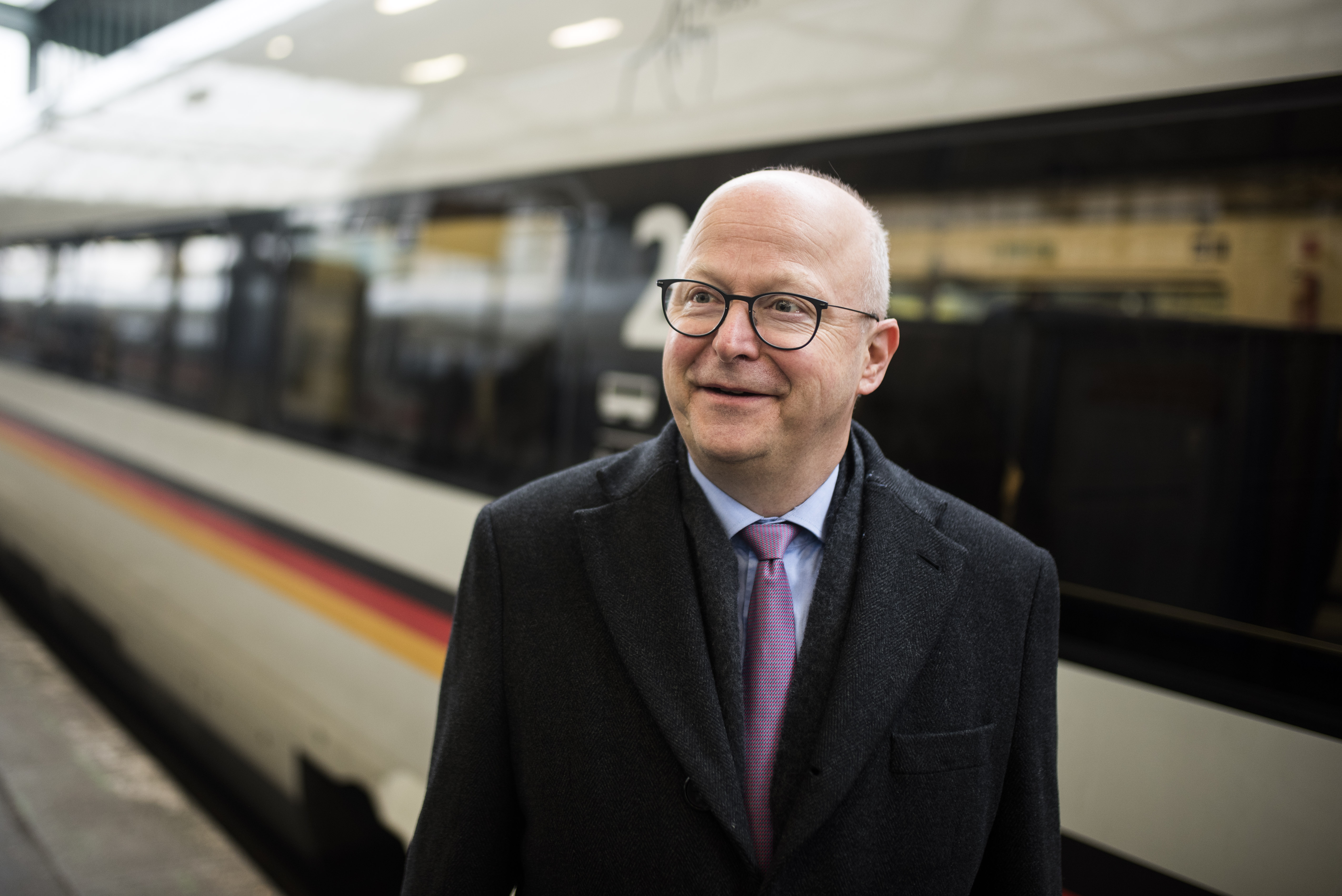
- Michael Theurer in 2022

Member of the Bundestag
- In office 2017–2024
- Succeeded by: Julian Grünke

Member of the European Parliament
- In office 2009–2017

Personal details
- Born: 12 January 1967 (age 59) Tübingen, West Germany (now Germany)
- Party: FDP
- Children: 2
- Education: University of Tübingen

Michael Alexander Theurer (born 12 January 1967) is a German politician of the Free Democratic Party (FDP) who has been serving as a member of the board of Bundesbank since 2024.

Theurer was a member of the Bundestag from the state of Baden-Württemberg from 2017 to 2024. From 2009 until 2017, he was a Member of the European Parliament.

In addition to his parliamentary work, Theurer served as Parliamentary State Secretary in the Federal Ministry of Transport and Digital Infrastructure in the coalition government of Chancellor Olaf Scholz from 2021 to 2024. In this capacity, he was also the Federal Commissioner for Rail Transport.

== Early life and career ==
After graduating from the Martin-Gerbert-Gymnasium in 1986, Theurer served in the Bundeswehr in Calw until 1987. From 1988 to 1990, he worked as a volunteer for the Schwarzwälder Bote in Oberndorf am Neckar. He then worked for a few months as local editor of the newspaper in Schramberg before beginning his studies in economics at the University of Tübingen in October 1990. He completed this in November 1995 as a graduate economist.

== Political career ==
=== Early career ===
Theurer joined the Young Liberals (JuLis), the youth organisation of the FDP, at age 16. From 1995 to August 2009 he served as Lord Mayor of the city of Horb am Neckar.

From 2001 to 2009, Theurer was a member of the State Parliament of Baden-Württemberg. He initially focused on European affairs and later served as deputy chair of his party's parliamentary group, under the leadership of Ulrich Noll.

=== Member of the European Parliament, 2009–2017 ===
From 2009 until 2017, Theurer was a member of the European Parliament. Throughout his time in parliament, he served on the Committee on Budgetary Control. In addition, he was a member of the Committee on Regional Development (2009-2012), the Committee on Industry, Research and Energy (2011-2012) and the Committee on Economic and Monetary Affairs (2014-2017). In 2015, he was part of the Special Committee on Tax Rulings and Other Measures Similar in Nature or Effect; on behalf of the committee, Elisa Ferreira and he drafted a series of non-binding recommendations.

After a poor showing by the FDP in the 2011 state elections, Theurer decided to challenge the long-standing chair Birgit Homburger. In an internal vote on succeeding Homburger in 2013, he eventually won over Hans-Ulrich Rülke.

=== Member of the German Parliament, 2017–present ===
Theurer became a member of the Bundestag in the 2017 German federal election. From 2017 until 2021, he served as deputy chairman of his party's parliamentary group, under the leadership of chairman Christian Lindner.

Following the 2021 state elections in Baden-Württemberg, Theurer led his party's delegation in the negotiations with Minister-President Winfried Kretschmann's Alliance '90/Greens on a potential coalition government.

In the negotiations to form a so-called traffic light coalition of the Social Democrats (SPD), the Green Party and the FDP following the 2021 federal elections, Theurer led his party's delegation in the working group on economic policy; his co-chairs from the other parties were Carsten Schneider and Cem Özdemir.

In April 2024, Theurer was nominated to join the board of Germany's Bundesbank. He left the Bundestag and was replaced by Julian Grünke.

== Other activities ==
=== Corporate boards ===
- KfW, Ex-Officio Member of the Board of Supervisory Directors (until 2021)

=== Non-profit organizations ===
- Baden-Badener Unternehmer-Gespräche (BBUG), Member of the Board of Trustees (since 2020)
- Reinhold Maier Foundation, Member of the Board of Trustees
- Theodor Heuss Foundation, Member of the Board of Trustees

== Personal life ==
Since 2016, Theurer has been married to neurologist Antje Giede-Jeppe.
