= Heike Engelhardt =

German politician (born 1961)

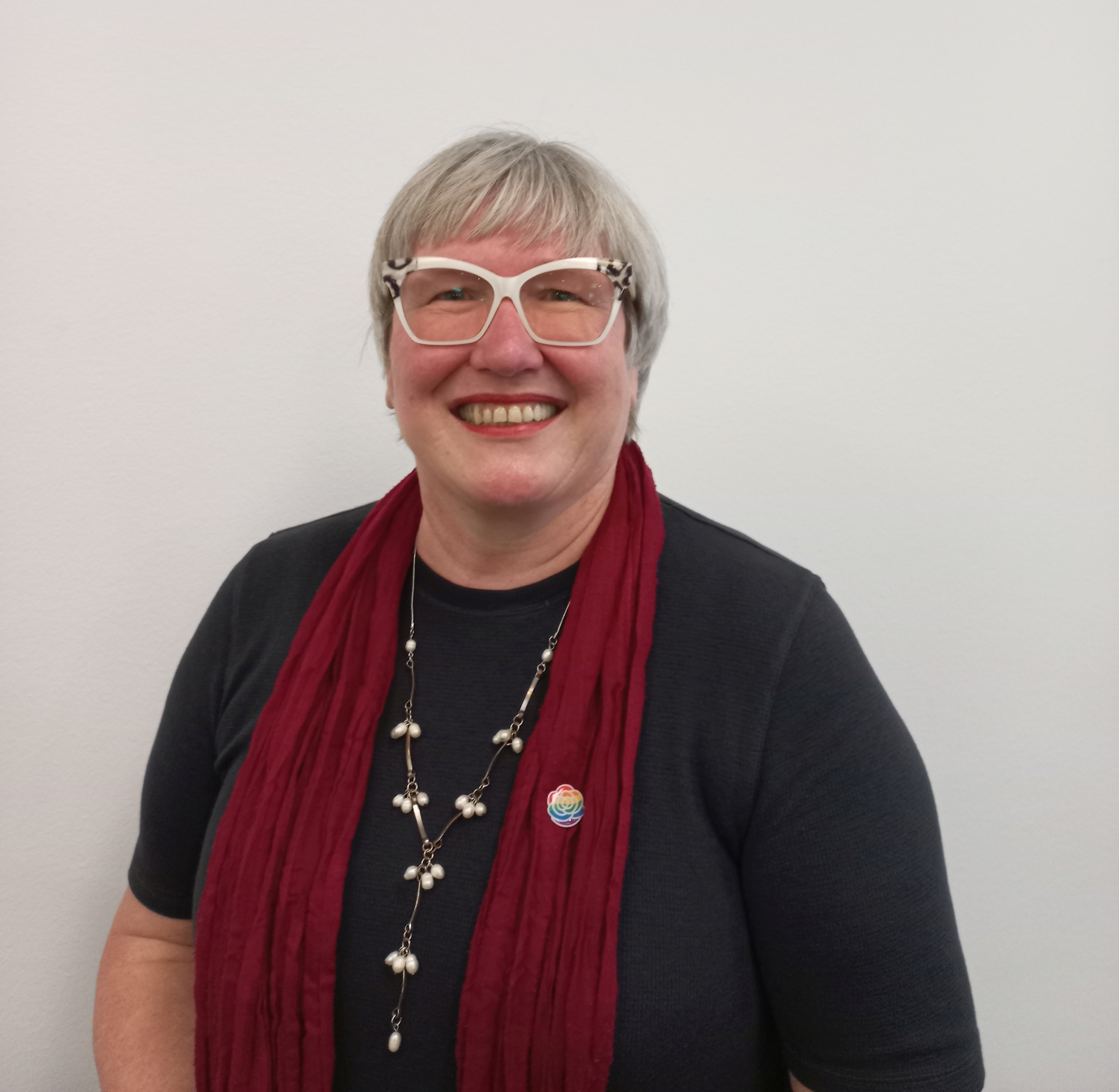

Member of the Bundestag
- In office October 2021 – March 2025

Personal details
- Born: 5 June 1961 (age 64) Stuttgart, West Germany (now Germany)
- Party: SPD

Heike Engelhardt (born 5 June 1961) is a German politician of the Social Democratic Party (SPD) who served as a member of the Bundestag from 2021 to 2025.

== Early life and education ==
Engelhardt was born 1961 in the West German city of Stuttgart.

== Political career ==
Engelhardt was elected to the Bundestag in 2021, representing the Ravensburg district.

In parliament, Engelhardt served on the Health Committee and the Committee on Human Rights and Humanitarian Aid.

In addition to her committee assignments, Engelhardt was part of the German Parliamentary Friendship Group for Relations with the Andean States. She was also a member of the German delegation to the Parliamentary Assembly of the Council of Europe (PACE) since 2022. In the Assembly, she served on the Committee on Social Affairs, Health and Sustainable Development and the Sub-Committee on Gender Equality.

Within her parliamentary group, Engelhardt belonged to the Parliamentary Left, a left-wing movement.

== Other activities ==
- German United Services Trade Union (ver.di), Member (since 2001)
- Education and Science Workers' Union (GEW), Member (since 1984)
- German Federation for the Environment and Nature Conservation, Member
