= Herta Däubler-Gmelin =

German politician

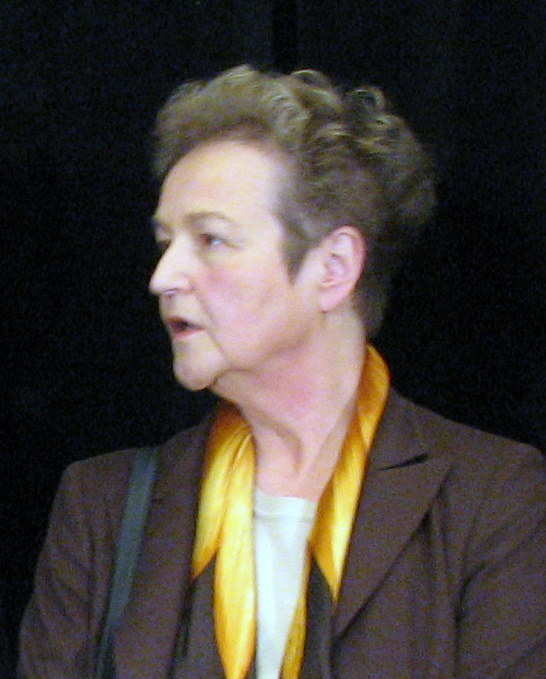
- Däubler-Gmelin (2008)

Minister of Justice
- In office 27 October 1998 – 22 October 2002
- Chancellor: Gerhard Schröder
- Preceded by: Edzard Schmidt-Jortzig
- Succeeded by: Brigitte Zypries

Member of the Bundestag; from Baden-Württemberg
- In office 13 December 1972 – 27 October 2009
- Constituency: State list (1972–1998); Tübingen (1998–2002); State list (2002–2009)

Personal details
- Born: Herta Gmelin; 12 August 1943 (age 83) Bratislava, Slovak Republic
- Party: Social Democratic
- Spouse: Wolfgang Däubler (m. 1969)
- Children: 2
- Education: University of Tübingen
- Website: daeubler-gmelin.de

Herta Däubler-Gmelin (German: [ˈhɛʁta ˈdɔʏblɐ ˈɡmeːliːn]; born 12 August 1943) is a German lawyer, academic and politician of the Social Democratic Party. She served as Federal Minister of Justice from 1998 to 2002, and as a Member of the Bundestag from 1972 to 2009. She currently teaches as an honorary professor of political science at the Free University of Berlin, particularly on international relations and human rights, and was the Hemmerle Professor at RWTH Aachen University in 2011. She is married to the legal scholar Wolfgang Däubler.

== History ==
She was born in Bratislava, in the war-time Slovak Republic, as the daughter of Hans Gmelin (d. 1991), who was mayor of Tübingen from 1954 to 1974. She studied history, economy, law and political science in Tübingen and Berlin. Since 1974, she has been admitted as a lawyer, first in Stuttgart, then in Berlin. Since 1992, she has lectured law at the Freie Universität Berlin, which made her an honorary professor in 1995.

== Political career ==
Däubler-Gmelin joined the German Social Democratic Party (SPD) in 1965 and became a member of the Bundestag in 1972, subsequently representing Tübingen from 1998 to 2002. She held several party offices in the 1980s and 1990s, serving as deputy party chairman from 1988-1997. From 1994–98, she was chairwoman of the working group on legal affairs and legal adviser to the SPD parliamentary group.

In 1993, the SPD nominated Däubler-Gmelin to fill the vacancy of vice-president of the Federal Constitutional Court, but after conservative parliamentary groups blocked the nomination for nine months as being "too political" she abandoned this career step in favor of Jutta Limbach. Ahead of the 1994 elections, SPD chairman Rudolf Scharping included her in his shadow cabinet for the party’s campaign to unseat incumbent Helmut Kohl as Chancellor. During the campaign, Däubler-Gmelin served as shadow minister of justice.

=== Federal Minister of Justice, 1998–2002 ===
From 1998 to 2002, Däubler-Gmelin served as Justice Minister in Gerhard Schröder's first cabinet, where she oversaw a number of controversial reform projects such as the reform of German citizenship legislation, the introduction of same-sex civil unions, and the overhaul of the German Civil Code, the most invasive since its inception in 1900.

In 1999, both Däubler-Gmelin and Foreign Minister Joschka Fischer appealed for clemency for the LaGrand brothers, two German citizens sentenced to death in Arizona. According to the German government, the LaGrands had been denied their rights as German citizens because prosecutors did not inform the German consulate of the brothers' arrest in 1982 until a decade later. However, both were put to death in a cloud of cyanide gas.

Amid the Enron scandal in 2002, Däubler-Gmelin launched a voluntary 12-page corporate governance code that calls on company audit committees to be aware of other business links between the company and its auditors, including consulting work.

On 18 September 2002, four days before Schröder's re-election, she attended a meeting at a restaurant in Derendingen (near Tübingen) with about 30 trade unionists from two local factories (the topic was "Globalization and Labor"). Däubler-Gmelin, who has long been known for her outspokenness, later said she had been unaware that a reporter from local newspaper Schwäbisches Tagblatt was present, insisting that she regarded the event as an internal meeting. After discussion had turned to the Iraq crisis, she remarked that U.S. president Bush was preparing a war to detract from domestic problems such as the economic crisis at the time, and that this was a popular political strategy which had already been used by Adolf Hitler. When some participants showed disagreement, she added immediately that this was not meant to liken Bush to Hitler as a person, but rather to compare their methods, and that British prime minister Margaret Thatcher had also used the 1982 Falklands War to improve election prospects. She also described the U.S. legal system as "lousy".

This was the version published by Schwäbisches Tagblatt (a paper widely regarded as liberal to leftist and respected for its journalistic quality), which later stated that Däubler-Gmelin herself had confirmed the wording of the report, as well as several present at the meeting. Another account of the meeting states that the Hitler comparison originated from a participant and that Däubler-Gmelin had merely agreed that Hitler had used such tactics, too.

Immediately after the article had been published, Däubler-Gmelin strongly denied it, claiming to have been misquoted. She also announced that she would sue the Schwäbische Tagblatt, but later chose not to do so. She encountered criticism for allegedly expressing anti-americanism in both Germany and abroad, including members of the U.S. government such as Ari Fleischer and Condoleezza Rice. On September 20, Däubler-Gmelin called U.S. Ambassador Dan Coats to state that the reports had no basis and Schröder wrote an apology letter to Bush, stating "there is no place at my cabinet table for anyone who makes a connection between the American president and such a criminal." He did not force her to resign immediately, claiming to trust her denial of the quotation, but she was dropped from his new cabinet when it was formed a few weeks after his narrow re-election.

=== Later work ===
From 2002 to 2005 Däubler-Gmelin served as chairwoman of the Bundestag's Committee on Consumer Protection and Agriculture, and from 2005 she chaired the Committee for Human Rights and Humanitarian Aid.

== Life after politics ==
Since 2004, Däubler-Gmelin has been practicing as Of counsel with the Berlin office of law firm Schwegler.

In 2009, Germany’s national railway company Deutsche Bahn commissioned Däubler-Gmelin and former Interior Minister Gerhart Baum with investigating allegations according to which the company had, in violation of privacy laws and corporate guidelines repeatedly and on a large scale compared personal data of its employees with those of suppliers, in a bid to uncover possible corruption.

Between 2012 and 2013, Däubler-Gmelin served as member of the European Commission’s High Level Group on Media Freedom and Pluralism, an advisory panel set up by European Commissioner Neelie Kroes and chaired by Vaira Vīķe-Freiberga.

She has voiced her support for the Campaign for the Establishment of a United Nations Parliamentary Assembly, an organisation which campaigns for democratic reform in the United Nations, and the creation of a more accountable international political system.

From 2012 to 2014, Däubler-Gmelin represented political group “Mehr Demokratie e.V.” (More Democracy) in its unsuccessful constitutional complaint before the Federal Constitutional Court against Germany’s participation in the European Stability Mechanism (ESM) and the European Fiscal Compact.

In 2019, Däubler-Gmelin was appointed to a task force investigating allegations of fraud and embezzlement at Workers' Welfare Association (AWO), a charity and one of Germany’s largest employers.

== Other activities ==
Däubler-Gmelin is a member of several charitable and non-profit organizations, including the following:

- European Law Students' Association (ELSA) – Germany Chapter, Member of the Advisory Board
- Friedrich Ebert Foundation (FES), Member
- German-Polish Lawyers’ Association (DPJV), Member of the Board of Trustees
- Hirschfeld Eddy Foundation, Member of the Board of Trustees
- Deutsche Hospiz- und PalliativStiftung, Member of the Board of Trustees
- Schneller Foundation, Member of the Board of Trustees
- Transparency Germany, Member of the Advisory Board

== Personal life ==
Däubler-Gmelin is married to Wolfgang Däubler, one of the most prominent experts on German labor law. They were married in 1969 and have two children.
