= Jürgen Todenhöfer =

German author and journalist (born 1940)

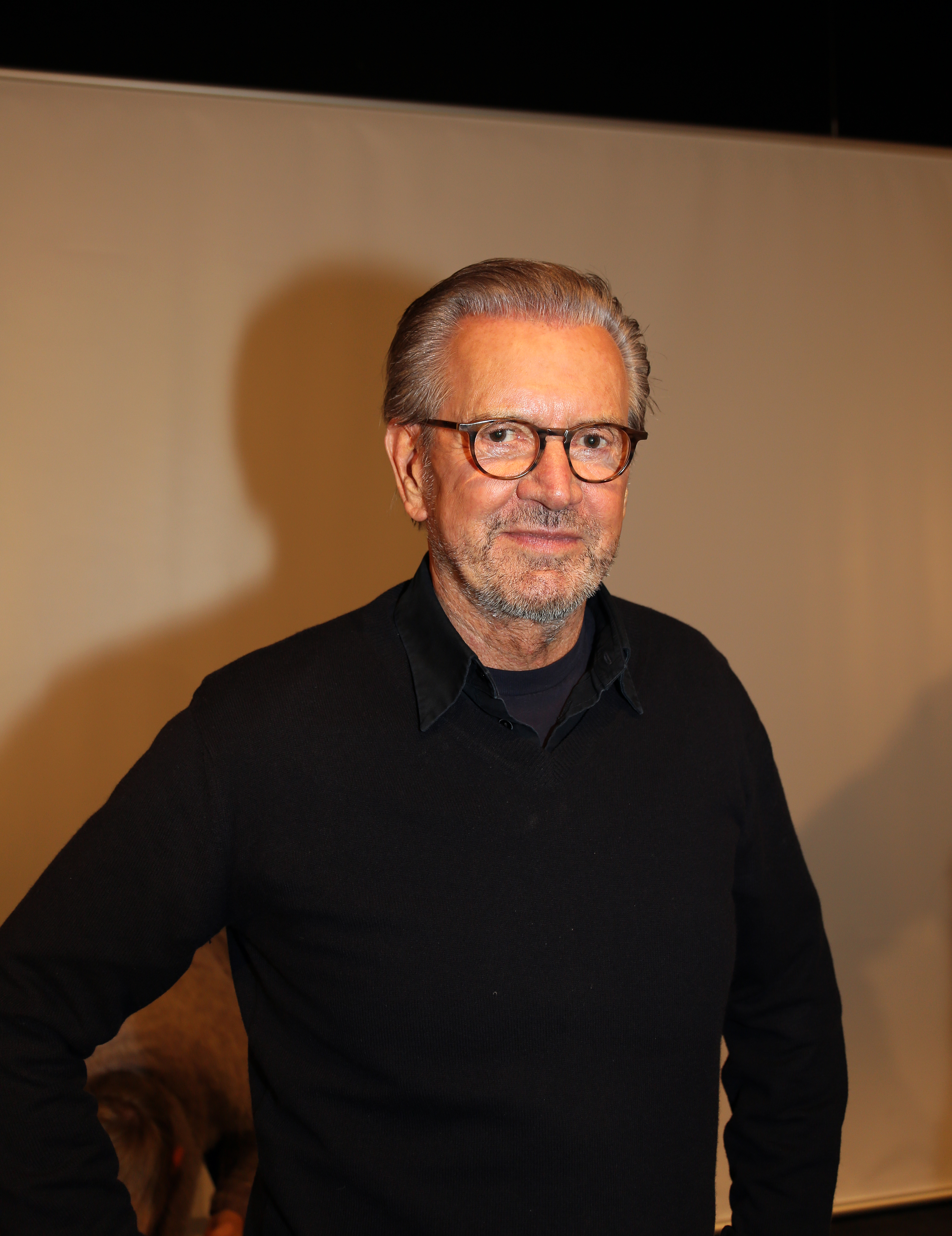
- Todenhöfer in 2015

Member of the Bundestag; from Baden-Württemberg
- In office 13 December 1972 – 20 December 1990
- Preceded by: Multi-member district
- Succeeded by: Claus-Peter Grotz
- Constituency: State list (1972–1980); Tübingen (1980–1990)

Personal details
- Born: 12 November 1940 (age 86) Offenburg, Germany
- Party: Team Todenhöfer (since 2020)
- Other political affiliations: CDU (1970–2020)
- Children: 2
- Education: LMU Munich; University of Paris; University of Bonn; University of Freiburg
- Occupation: Journalist; Politician; Executive
- Website: www.juergentodenhoefer.com

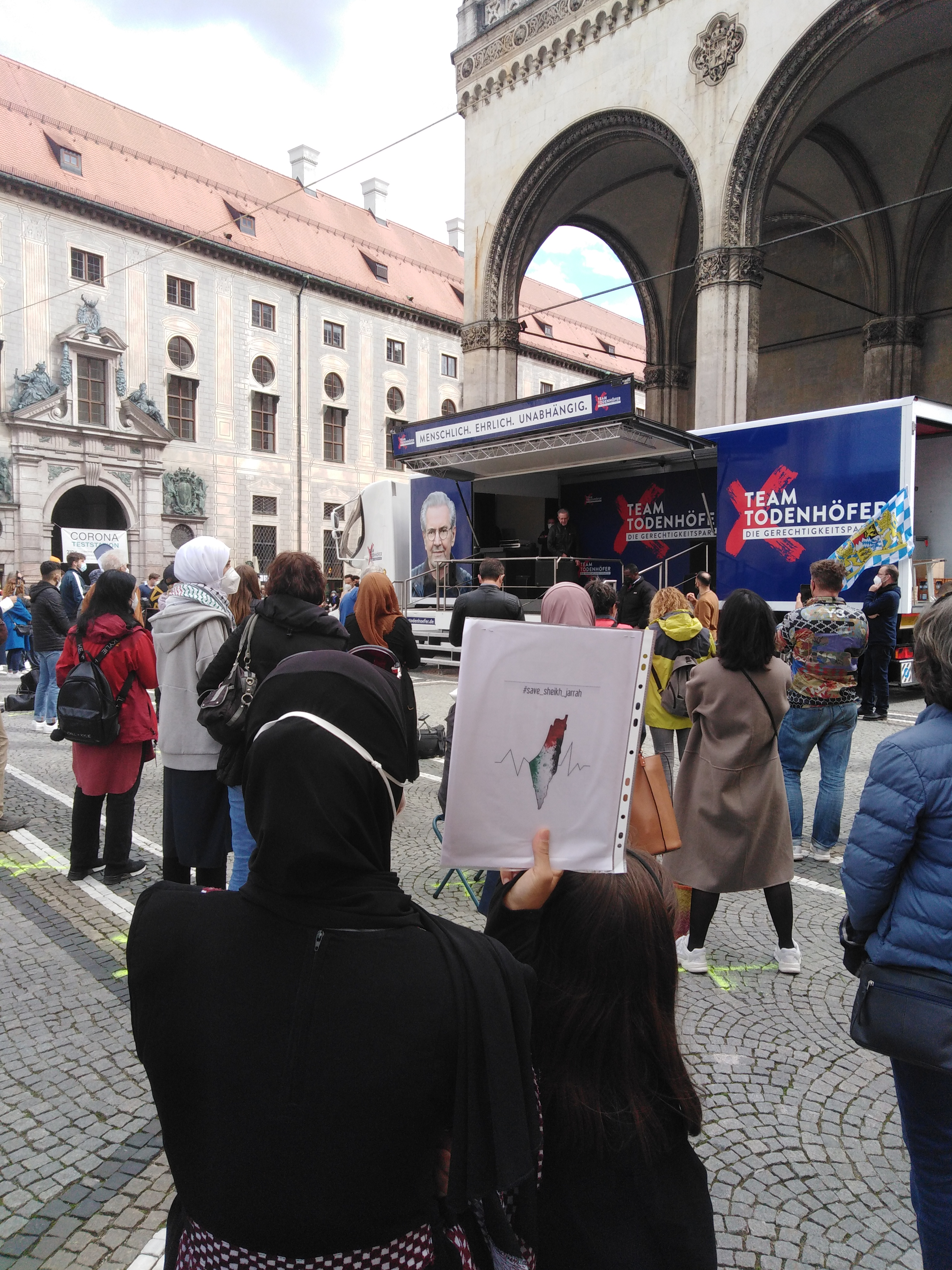
Election campaign of Jürgen Todenhöfer's party Team Todenhöfer in Munich at the Feldherrnhalle, 15 May 2021

Jürgen Todenhöfer (born 12 November 1940) is a German author, journalist, politician, executive and former judge.

== Early life and education ==
Todenhöfer was born in Offenburg in what is now the German state of Baden-Württemberg. He studied law at the universities of Munich, Paris, Bonn and Freiburg. He graduated as a doctor of law in 1969 and worked as a judge in 1972.

== Political career ==
Todenhöfer became a member of the Christian Democratic Union of Germany (CDU) in 1970 which he left on 12 November 2020, his 80th birthday, to found a new political party and was a member of the Bundestag from 13 December 1972 to 20 December 1990 (five election periods) where he represented Tübingen and was affiliated with the pejoratively named "Stahlhelm-Fraktion." He also acted as party spokesman for development policy and arms control. He was vice chairman of the executive board of German media company Hubert Burda Media until 2008. He is considered to be a pacifist although he pointed out that he is not. He participated in the federal elections 2021 and 2025 with his own party, Team Todenhöfer, each time missing the 5% threshold.

He is a Christian.

== Journalism ==
In 1980 he visited Soviet-occupied Afghanistan and started to raise money for refugees. Todenhöfer is one of the most prominent German critics of the US-led wars against Afghanistan and Iraq in 2001 and 2003, respectively.

He claims that during the war in Iraq the Bush administration was deceiving the public and that the US war in Iraq has killed several hundred thousand Iraqi civilians. He has visited Iraq several times and did original research for his book Why do you kill, Zaid?

Following the International Criminal Court's arrest warrant against the Sudanese dictator Omar al-Bashir, he sent an open letter to the Prosecutor General of the ICC, Luis Moreno-Ocampo. He asked for the reasons which led the prosecutor to indict the Sudanese dictator but not the US president George W. Bush or the British prime minister Tony Blair, seeing that neither Sudan nor the US have recognized the International Criminal Court.

=== First western journalist to visit ISIS ===
In the summer of 2014 Todenhӧfer sent a message on Facebook to more than 80 German ISIS soldiers asking whether he could visit the ISIS fighting cadre. His goal was to understand the motivations of ISIS. On 9 September, Abu Qatadah, a 31-year-old German and an important person in ISIS media, answered the message. They had Skype discussions for several months. Finally, Todenhӧfer received a document guaranteeing his safety. In October 2014, Todenhӧfer was the first western journalist to travel to ISIS-controlled territory. He was accompanied by his filmmaker son, Frederic.

Todenhöfer wrote that he stayed with an ISIS soldier who was armed with a Kalashnikov rifle. The soldier told him that he was sure to return home alive because ISIS wanted to be accepted as a state, so he had the guarantee of safety from their leadership. In other words, violation of the guarantee would mean violation of this state. Todenhӧfer spent most of his time in Mosul, Iraq but he could have visited ISIS-controlled cities in Syria such as Raqqa and Deir ez-Zor.

=== Interview with al Nusra commander ===
In 2016 Todenhöfer filmed an interview with an alleged Syrian rebel commander near Aleppo. The commander, said to be with the al-Qaeda affiliated group the Al-Nusra Front (later Jabhat Fateh al-Sham), claimed to have American support and said his group opposed humanitarian aid to civilians. Whether the commander was truly a Nusra fighter was later questioned and the authenticity of the video disputed. Todenhöfer did not respond to questions about his interview.

== Controversies ==
=== "Inside IS" book ===
In 2016 the German newspaper Der Spiegel analyzed Todenhöfer's book "Inside IS", in which he reports allegedly visiting the Islamic State and speaking to several of its members. Der Spiegel's article contained many strong accusations, disputing most of Todenhöfer's claims. The article concluded Todenhöfer's work was more a "fictional novel than a factual documentary", and calling Todenhöfer a "Märchenonkel" (lying pope). Todenhöfer subsequently sued Der Spiegel.

=== Cooperation with Xavier Naidoo ===
In 2015 Todenhöfer recorded a song with the German songwriter Xavier Naidoo, who had drifted towards the far-right. The song was a protest against the German support of the military intervention in Syria. In it, Muslims are called the "new Jews bearing the responsibility of the star of David". In general opinion Naidoo's and Todenhöfer's song was widely criticized, citing their blunt antisemitism and relationship to Syria's dictator Assad. In fact, Todenhöfer has been found in close contact to Assad and his daughter, calling her "my little princess".

== Major works ==
- Todenhöfer, Jürgen (2003). Wer weint schon um Abdul und Tanaya? [Who actually weeps for Abdul and Tanaya?] (in German). Freiburg im Breisgau Basel Wien: Herder. ISBN 978-3-451-05420-4.
- —— (2005). Andy und Marwa (in German). München: Bertelsmann. ISBN 978-3-570-00859-1.
- —— (2008). Warum tötest du, Zaid? [Why do You Kill, Zaid?] (in German). München: Bertelsmann. ISBN 978-3-570-01022-8.
- —— (2009). Why Do You Kill?. Disinformation Company. ISBN 978-1-934708-14-9.
- —— (2010). Teile dein Glück ... und du veränderst die Welt [Share your happiness ... and you change the world.] (in German). München: Bertelsmann. ISBN 978-3-570-10069-1.
- —— (2013). Du sollst nicht töten [Thou shall not kill.] (in German). München: Bertelsmann. ISBN 978-3-570-10182-7.
- —— (27 April 2015). Inside IS - 10 Tage im 'Islamischen Staat' [Inside IS – 10 Days in the 'Islamic State'] (in German). München: Bertelsmann. ISBN 978-3-570-10276-3.

== Bibliography ==
Notes
