= Ronja Kemmer =

German politician

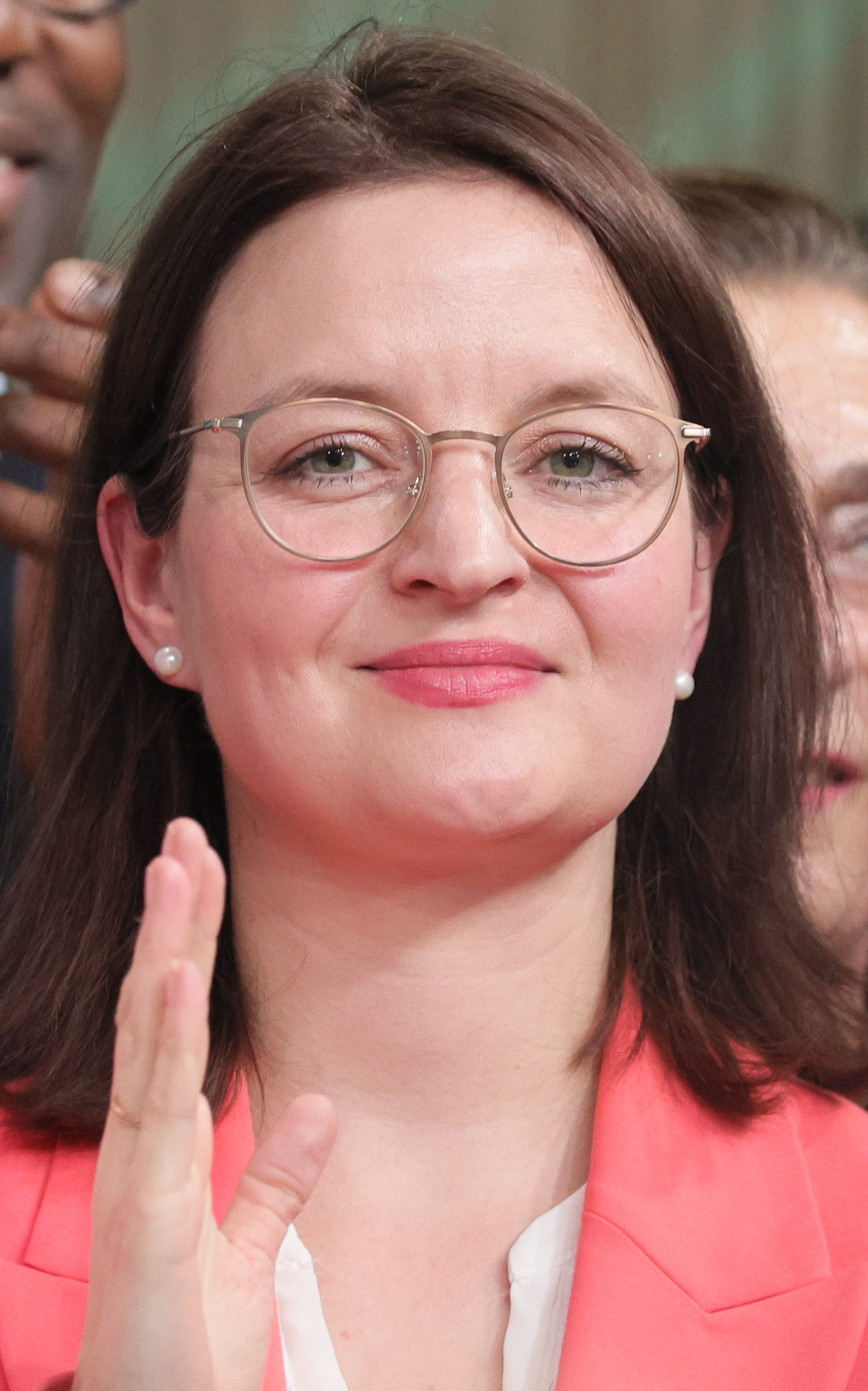
- Kemmer in 2025

Member of the Bundestag
- In office 27 December 2014 – 21 May 2026
- Preceded by: Andreas Schockenhoff
- Succeeded by: Christoph Naser
- Constituency: Ravensburg (2014–2017); Ulm (2017–2026)

Personal details
- Born: Ronja Schmitt; 3 May 1989 (age 37) Esslingen am Neckar, West Germany
- Party: Christian Democratic Union
- Children: 2
- Education: University of Tübingen; Lund University; University of Pavia; University of Hohenheim

Ronja Kemmer (née Schmitt, born 3 May 1989) is a German politician of the Christian Democratic Union (CDU) who served as a member of the Bundestag from the state of Baden-Württemberg from 2014 to 2026.

== Political career ==
=== Member of the German Parliament, 2014–2026 ===
Following the death of Andreas Schockenhoff, Kemmer took his parliamentary seat in December 2014. She was a member of the Committee on European Affairs before moving to the Committee on Education, Research and Technology Assessment (2018–2021) and the Committee on the Digital Agenda (2018–2025). On the Committee on the Digital Agenda, she was her parliamentary group's rapporteur on artificial intelligence.

In the negotiations to form a Grand Coalition under the leadership of Friedrich Merz's Christian Democrats (CDU together with the Bavarian CSU) and the Social Democratic Party (SPD) following the 2025 German elections, Kemmer was part of the CDU/CSU delegation in the working group on digital policy, led by Manuel Hagel, Reinhard Brandt and Armand Zorn.

From 2025 to 2026, Kemmer served as deputy chair of the CDU/CSU parliamentary group, under the leadership of chairman Jens Spahn. In this capacity, she oversaw the group's legislative activity on research, digitization and state modernization.

=== Career in state government ===
In the negotiations to form a coalition government under the leadership of Cem Özdemir following the 2026 state elections in Baden-Württemberg, Kemmer co-chaired the working group on digitization, alongside Lena Schwelling. She subsequently was appointed the incoming state government's chief information officer (CIO), serving under State Minister of the Interior Manuel Hagel.

== Other activities ==
- German-Israeli Health Forum for Artificial Intelligence (GIHF-AI), Member of the Board of Trustees (since 2022)
- Federal Agency for Disruptive Innovation (SPRIN-D), Member of the supervisory board (2020–2026)

== Political positions ==
In June 2017, Kemmer voted against Germany's introduction of same-sex marriage.

For the 2021 national elections, Kemmer endorsed Markus Söder as the Christian Democrats' joint candidate to succeed Chancellor Angela Merkel.

== Controversy ==
Amid the COVID-19 pandemic in Germany in 2020, Kemmer was one of three members of her parliamentary group – alongside Wolfgang Stefinger and Christoph Ploß – who became the subject of media scrutiny after they had accepted an invitation to embark on a three-day short trip to Oman; Oman's embassy covered their travel expenses of 5,466 euros each.

== Personal life ==
Kammer has been married to lawyer and fellow CDU politician Fabian Kemmer since 2016. The couple has a daughter; their first daughter died at the age of four in 2025.
