= Agnieszka Brugger =

German politician (born 1985)

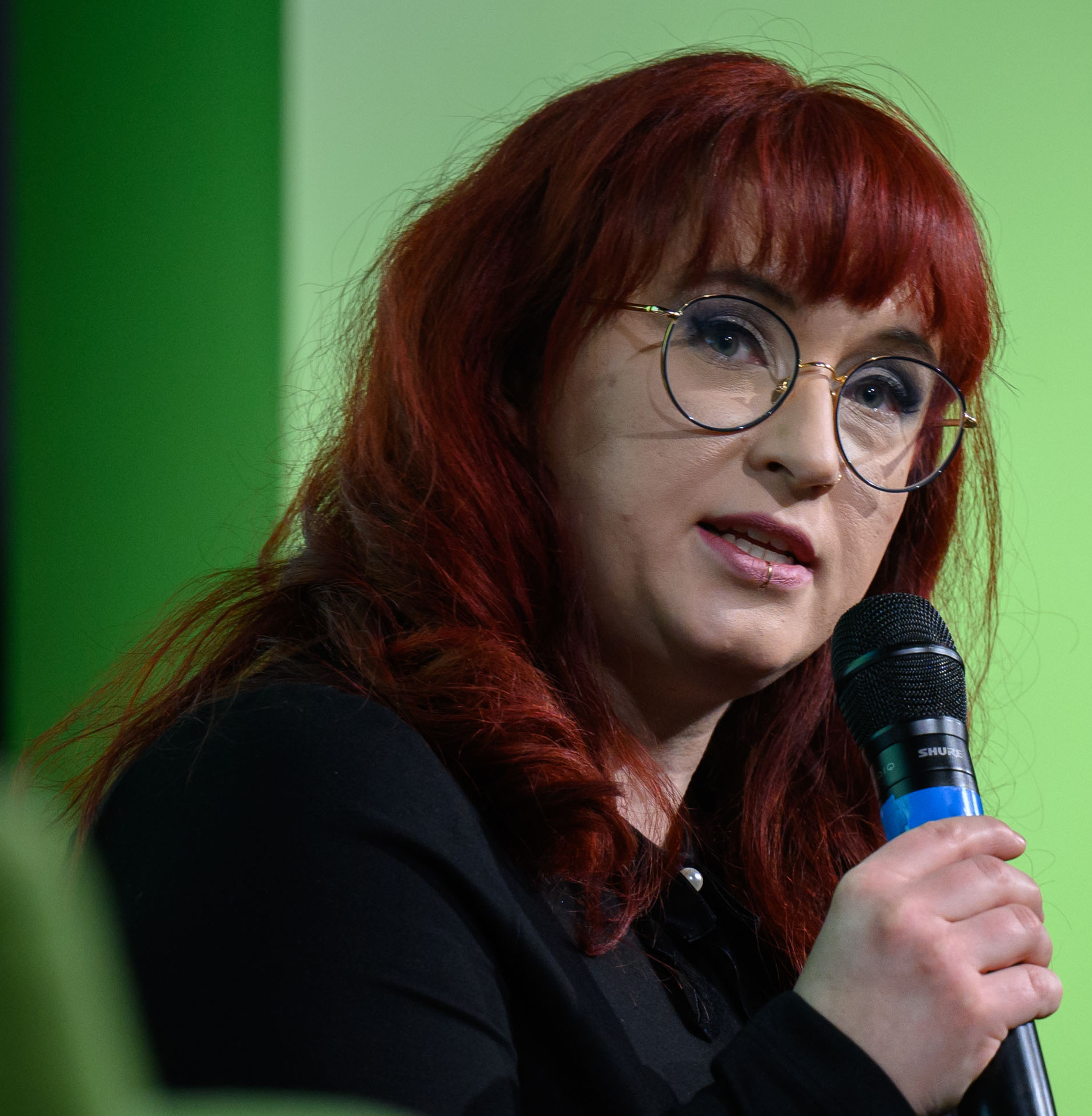
- Brugger in 2023

Member of the Bundestag
- Incumbent
- Assumed office 2009

Personal details
- Born: Agnieszka Malczak; February 8, 1985 (age 41) Legnica, Poland
- Citizenship: German
- Party: Alliance '90/The Greens

Agnieszka Brugger (née Malczak, born 8 February 1985) is a German politician (Alliance 90/The Greens) who has been serving as a member of the German Bundestag since 2009. Since 2018 she serves as vice-chair of Alliance '90/The Greens in the Bundestag.

== Early life and education ==
Born in Legnica, Poland, Brugger moved to West Germany with her parents in 1989. She grew up in Dortmund, where she graduated from the Mallinckrodt-Gymnasium, a private highschool operated by the Roman Catholic Archdiocese of Paderborn. She studied political science at the University of Tübingen, so far without graduation, as she interrupted her academic studies for her political career.

== Political career ==
From 2005 until 2007, Brugger was a member of the General Students' Committee (AStA) of the University of Tübingen. She later led the Green Youth in Baden-Württemberg between 2007 and 2009.

Brugger has been a member of the German Bundestag since the 2009 election. From 2013 until 2017 she served as her parliamentary group's spokeswoman on the Defense Committee and the Subcommittee on Disarmament, Arms Control and Non-Proliferation.

In her capacity as member of the Defense Committee, Brugger has traveled extensively to visit Bundeswehr troops on their missions abroad, including the United Nations Multidimensional Integrated Stabilization Mission in Mali (2015) and the Operation Counter Daesh at the Incirlik Air Base (2016).

In the – unsuccessful – negotiations to form a coalition government with the Christian Democrats – both the Christian Democratic Union (CDU) and the Christian Social Union in Bavaria (CSU) – and the Free Democratic Party (FDP) following the 2017 national elections, Brugger was part of the 14-member delegation of the Green Party. In early 2018, she became part of her parliamentary group's leadership around co-chairs Katrin Göring-Eckardt and Anton Hofreiter. In this capacity, she oversees the group's initiatives on foreign affairs, defense and development policy.

In 2018 she was elected vice-chair of Alliance '90/The Greens in Bundestag, responsible for coordination of the caucus on the issues of Foreign Affairs, Defense, Human Rights, Development and European Affairs. She has been reelected to this position in 2021 and 2025.

In the negotiations to form a so-called traffic light coalition of the Social Democratic Party (SPD) and the Free Democratic Party (FDP) following the 2021 federal elections, Brugger was part of her party's delegation in the working group on foreign policy, defence, development cooperation and human rights, co-chaired by Heiko Maas, Omid Nouripour and Alexander Graf Lambsdorff.

In 2023, Brugger was one of the initiators – alongside Michelle Müntefering and Marie-Agnes Strack-Zimmermann – of a cross-party group promoting a feminist foreign policy.

== Other activities ==
- Federal Academy for Security Policy (BAKS), Member of the advisory board (since 2015)
- Heinrich Böll Foundation, Member of the Board, Member of the Europe/Transatlantic Advisory Board
- Institute for Peace Research and Security Policy (IFSH) at the University of Hamburg, Member of the Board of Commission on European Security and the Reform of the Bundeswehr
- Institut Solidarische Moderne (ISM), Founding Member (since 2010 until 2025)

== Political positions ==
After the Russian invasion of Ukraine, Brugger was a strong advocate for solidarity with Ukraine, including the shipments of weapons to Ukraine and strong sanctions against Russia.

Brugger has in the past voted in favor of German participation in United Nations peacekeeping missions as well as in United Nations-mandated European Union peacekeeping and military missions on the African continent, such as in Mali – both EUTM Mali (2013, 2014, 2015, 2016 and 2017) and MINUSMA (2013, 2014, 2015, 2016, 2017 and 2018) –, the Central African Republic (2014) and Liberia (2015).

On Libya, Sudan, South Sudan and Somalia, Brugger has a mixed voting record. She opposes German participation in EU Navfor Med. She abstained from the votes on the missions for Darfur/Sudan (2017) and South Sudan (2017) after previously voting in favor of both missions (2010, 2011, 2012, 2013, 2014 and 2015). Since 2009, she has regularly abstained from votes on extending the mandate for the mission of Operation Atalanta. She also abstained (2015) or voted against German participation in the EUTM Somalia (2016 and 2017).
