= Annette Widmann-Mauz =

German politician (born 1966)

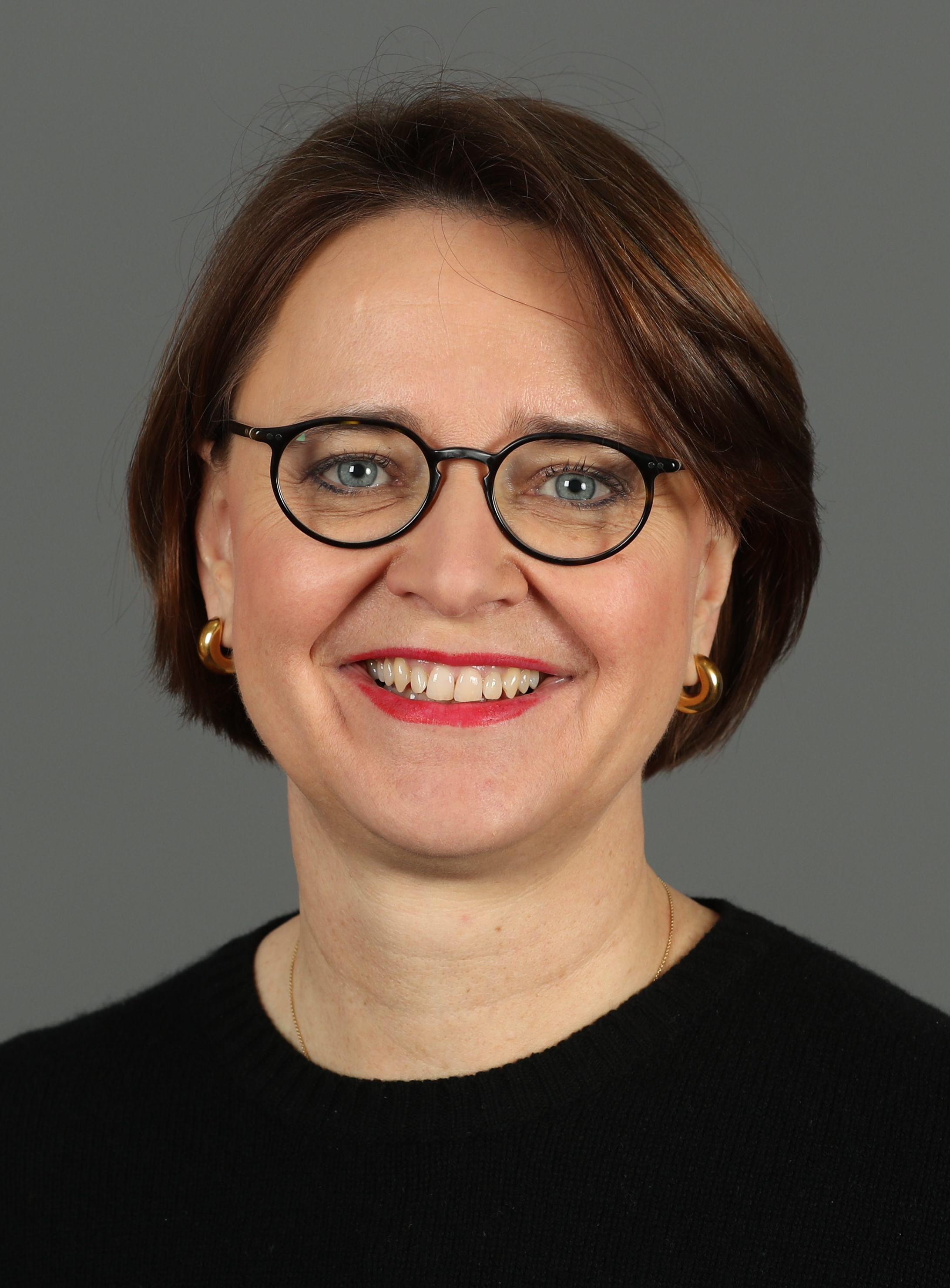
- Widmann-Mauz in 2020

Minister of State for Migration, Refugees and Integration
- In office 14 March 2018 – 8 December 2021
- Chancellor: Angela Merkel
- Preceded by: Aydan Özoğuz
- Succeeded by: Reem Alabali-Radovan

Parliamentary State Secretary for Health
- In office 29 October 2009 – 14 March 2018
- Minister: Philipp Rösler; Daniel Bahr; Hermann Gröhe
- Preceded by: Rolf Schwanitz
- Succeeded by: Thomas Gebhart

Member of the Bundestag; from Baden-Württemberg
- In office 26 October 1998 – 25 March 2025
- Preceded by: Multi-member district
- Succeeded by: Seat vacant
- Constituency: State list (1998–2002); Tübingen (2002–2025)

Personal details
- Born: Annette Widmann; 13 June 1966 (age 60) Tübingen, West Germany
- Party: Christian Democratic Union
- Website: www.widmann-mauz.de

Annette Widmann-Mauz (née Widmann; born 13 June 1966) is a German politician of the Christian Democrats who served as a member of the German Bundestag (the German federal parliament) from 1998 to 2025, representing the electoral district of Tübingen. In addition to her work in parliament, she served as Parliamentary State Secretary in Chancellor Angela Merkel's cabinet from 2009 until 2021.

== Political career ==
=== Member of the Bundestag (1998–2025) ===
In the 1998 federal election Widmann-Mauz was elected from the CDU Baden-Württemberg list, the second largest chapter of her party. Four years later, in 2002, she was elected directly for the constituency of Tübingen. She has won each re-election in this electoral district at all federal elections since.

In her first legislative term, Widmann-Mauz joined the Committee on Health. Between 2005 and 2009, she served as her parliamentary group's spokesperson on health policy.

Since 2003, Widmann-Mauz has been serving as deputy chairwoman of the CDU Baden-Württemberg, under the leadership of successive chairmen Erwin Teufel (2003-2005), Günther Oettinger (2005-2009), Stefan Mappus (2009-2011) and Thomas Strobl (since 2011).

=== Career in government (2009–2021) ===
In the negotiations to form a coalition government of the Christian Democrats (CDU together with the Bavarian CSU) and the Free Democrats (FDP) following the 2009 federal elections, Widmann-Mauz was part of the CDU/CSU delegation in the working group on health policy, led by Ursula von der Leyen and Philipp Rösler. On 29 October 2009 she became Parliamentary State Secretary at the Federal Ministry of Health. In the second Merkel cabinet, she first served alongside Daniel Bahr under the leadership of Minister Philipp Rösler (2009-2011) and later under Bahr, who replaced Rösler in 2011. In 2011, she participated in the first joint cabinet meeting between the German government and the State Council of the People's Republic of China in Berlin.

From 2012 to 2022, Widmann-Mauz was a member of the CDU's national board under the leadership of successive chairs Angela Merkel (2012-2018), Annegret Kramp-Karrenbauer (2018–2021) and Armin Laschet (2021–2022). She co-chaired the CDU's national conventions in Karlsruhe (2015) and Essen (2016).

In the negotiations to form a third cabinet under Merkel following the 2013 federal elections, Widmann-Mauz led the working group on families, alongside Manuela Schwesig. In the new coalition government, she again served as Parliamentary State Secretary for Health, this time under the leadership of Minister Hermann Gröhe.

From 2015 to 2025, Widman-Mauz led the Christian Democrats’ Women's Union.

In the negotiations to form a fourth cabinet under Merkel following the 2017 federal elections, Widmann-Mauz led the working group on families, alongside Angelika Niebler and Katarina Barley. She was subsequently appointed Minister of State for Migration, Refugees and Integration in the Federal Chancellery under Merkel.

Following her party's defeat in the 2021 elections, Widmann-Mauz announced her candidacy as Vice President of the Bundestag; however, the CDU/CSU parliamentary group eventually nominated Yvonne Magwas for the position.

In July 2024, Widmann-Mauz announced that she would not stand in the 2025 federal elections but instead resign from active politics by the end of the parliamentary term.

== Other activities ==
=== Corporate boards ===
- Paracelsus-Kliniken Deutschland GmbH & Co. KGaA, Member of the supervisory board (2005-2013)
- Hallesche Krankenversicherung, Member of the advisory board (2005-2013)

=== Non-profit organizations ===
- German Federal Cultural Foundation, Member of the Board of Trustees (since 2022)
- Konrad Adenauer Foundation (KAS), Member of the Board of Trustees
- German Bishops' Conference (DBK), Advisor to the Commission on Charitable Affairs (since 2020)
- Jewish Museum Berlin, Member of the Board of Trustees
- Bündnis für Demokratie und Toleranz, Ex-officio Member of the advisory board (since 2018)
- Civis Media Prize, Ex-Officio Member of the Board of Trustees (since 2018)
- Deutschlandstiftung Integration, Ex-Officio Member of the Board (since 2018)
- German Football Association (DFB), Egidius Braun Foundation, Ex-Officio Member of the Board of Trustees (since 2018)
- Civis Media Prize, Ex-Officio Member of the Board of Trustees (since 2018)
- Deutschlandstiftung Integration, Ex-Officio Member of the Board (since 2018)
- German Football Association (DFB), Egidius Braun Foundation, Ex-Officio Member of the Board of Trustees (since 2018)
- Deutsche Hospiz- und Palliativstiftung (DHPS), Member of the Board of Trustees
- Max Planck Institute for Biological Cybernetics, Member of the Board of Trustees
- Max Planck Institute for Developmental Biology, Member of the Board of Trustees
- Memorial to the Murdered Jews of Europe Foundation, Member of the Board of Trustees (1998-2013)
- German Association for Psychiatry, Psychotherapy and Neurology (DGPPN), Member of the advisory board (2002-2005)

== Political positions ==
In 2014, Widmann-Mauz negotiated legislation requiring German companies to allot 30 percent of their non-executive board seats to women from 2016.

In June 2017, Widmann-Mauz voted against Germany's introduction of same-sex marriage.

Ahead of the Christian Democrats’ leadership election in 2018, Widmann-Mauz publicly endorsed Annegret Kramp-Karrenbauer to succeed Angela Merkel as the party's chair.

In April 2020, Widmann-Mauz co-signed – alongside around 50 other members of her parliamentary group – a letter to President of the European Commission Ursula von der Leyen which called on the European Union to take in children who were living in migrant camps across Greece.
