= Martin Rosemann =

German politician

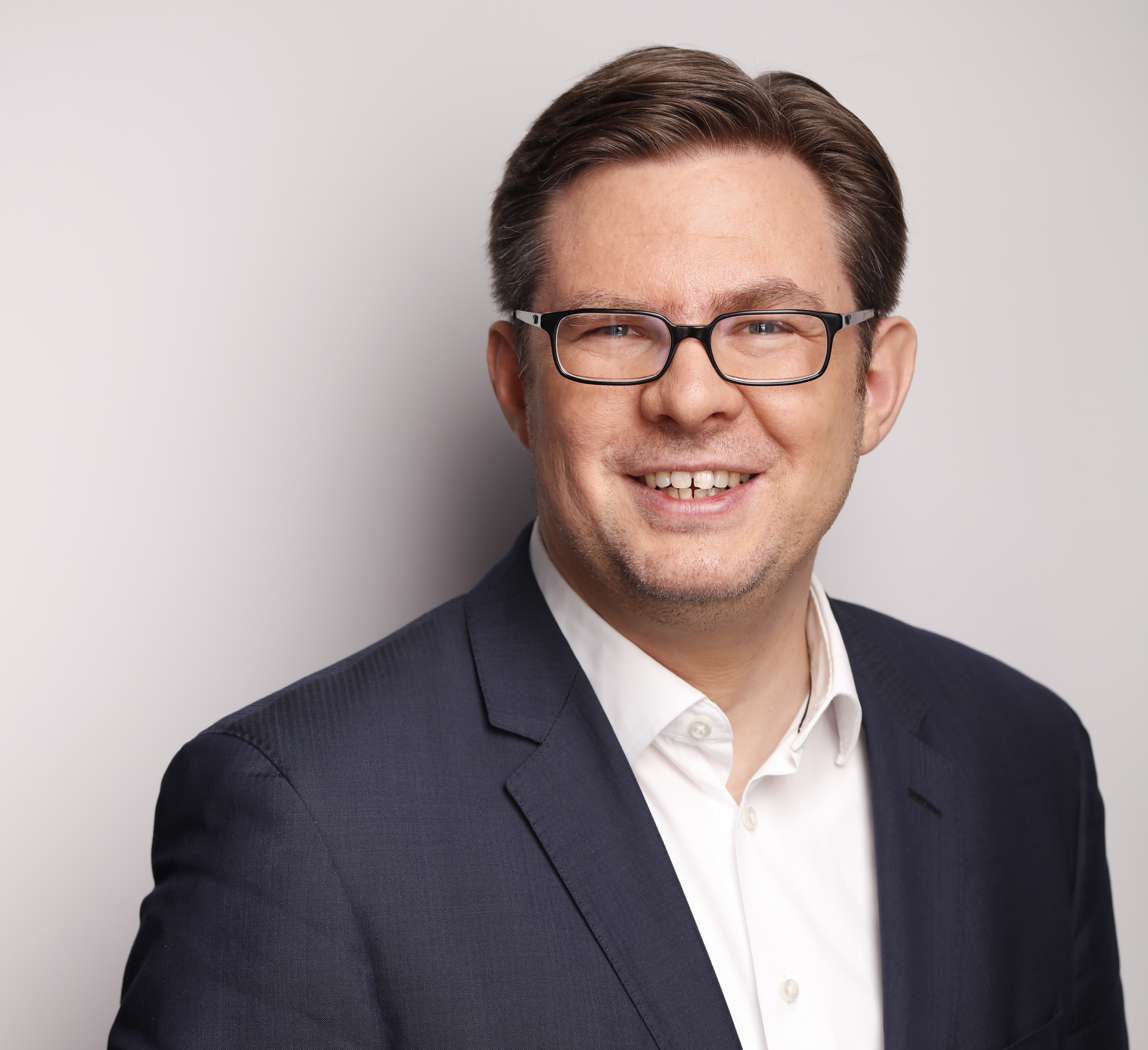
- Martin Rosemann in 2017

Member of the Bundestag
- In office 2013–2025

Personal details
- Born: 20 October 1976 (age 49) Saulgau, West Germany (now Germany)
- Party: SPD
- Children: 2
- Education: University of Tübingen

Martin Rosemann (born 20 October 1976) is a German economist and politician of the Social Democratic Party (SPD) who served as a member of the Bundestag from the state of Baden-Württemberg from 2013 to 2025.

== Early life and education ==
From 1996 until 2001, Rosemann studied economics at the University of Tübingen, on a scholarship of the German Academic Scholarship Foundation. He subsequently worked at the university’s Institute for Applied Economic Research (IAW) from 2002 until 2011 and later headed the Berlin office of the Institute for Social Research (ISG) from 2011 until 2013.

== Political career ==
From 2000 until 2003, Rosemann served as chairman of the Young Socialists in Baden-Württemberg.

Rosemann first became a member of the Bundestag in the 2013 German federal election, representing Tübingen. In parliament, he was a member of the Committee on Labour and Social Affairs, where he served as his parliamentary group's rapporteur on pensions in Germany.

In the negotiations to form a coalition government under the leadership of Chancellor Angela Merkel following the 2017 federal elections, Rosemann was part of the working group on digital policy, led Helge Braun, Dorothee Bär and Lars Klingbeil.

In the negotiations to form a so-called traffic light coalition of the SPD, the Green Party and the Free Democrats (FDP) following the 2021 German elections, Rosemann was part of his party's delegation in the working group on social policy, co-chaired by Dagmar Schmidt, Sven Lehmann and Johannes Vogel.

In July 2024, Rosemann announced that he would not stand in the 2025 federal elections but instead resign from active politics by the end of the parliamentary term.

== Other activities ==
- German United Services Trade Union (ver.di), Member
