= Alexander Kulitz =

German politician

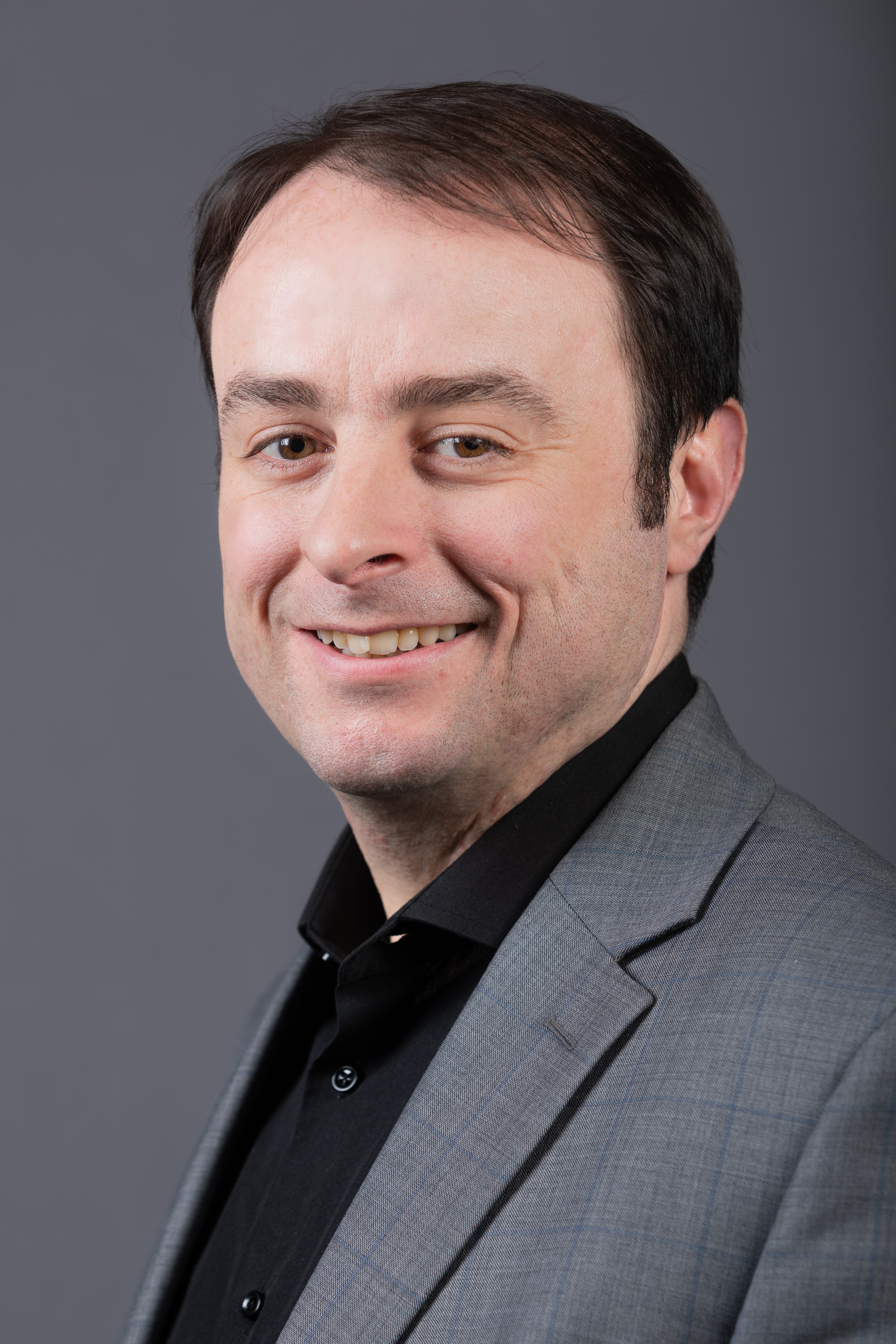
Kulitz in 2020

Alexander Kulitz (born August 12, 1981 in Tübingen) is a German politician and member of the Bundestag. He is a lawyer, and a member of the Free Democratic Party.
