= Heike Hänsel =

German politician

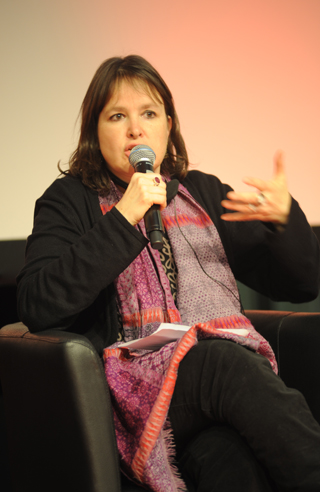
- Heike Hänsel in 2011

Member of the Bundestag
- In office 2005–2021

Personal details
- Born: 1 January 1966 (age 60) Stuttgart, West Germany (now Germany)
- Party: The Left
- Occupation: Graduate oecotrophologist

Heike Hänsel (born 1 January 1966) is a German politician, representing The Left. Born in Stuttgart, Baden-Württemberg, Heike Hänsel served as a member of the Bundestag from the state of Baden-Württemberg from 2005 to 2021.

== Education ==
After graduating from high school in 1985 at the Gymnasium am Romäusring in Villingen-Schwenningen, Heike Hänsel began studying Catholic theology at the Eberhard Karls University of Tübingen. In 1990, she moved to the Justus Liebig University in Gießen, where she studied ecotrophology, which she completed in 1997 as a graduate ecotrophologist.

== Career ==
Hansel has been active in the peace movement since 1988. From 1997 she worked for the Society for the Culture of Peace and was an election observer on behalf of the OSCE. She has been involved in the Attac movement, which is critical of globalization, since 2001. From 2001 to 2003, she was a member of the Attac Germany coordination group and from 2004 to 2005 spokeswoman for the EU-AG of Attac Germany.

Heike Hänsel has been a member of the Bundestag since 2005. She is a member of the Foreign Affairs Committee. She is vice-chairwoman of her parliamentary group and spokeswoman for international relations.

She lost her seat at the 2021 German federal election.
