= Team Todenhöfer =

The Justice Party – Team Todenhöfer
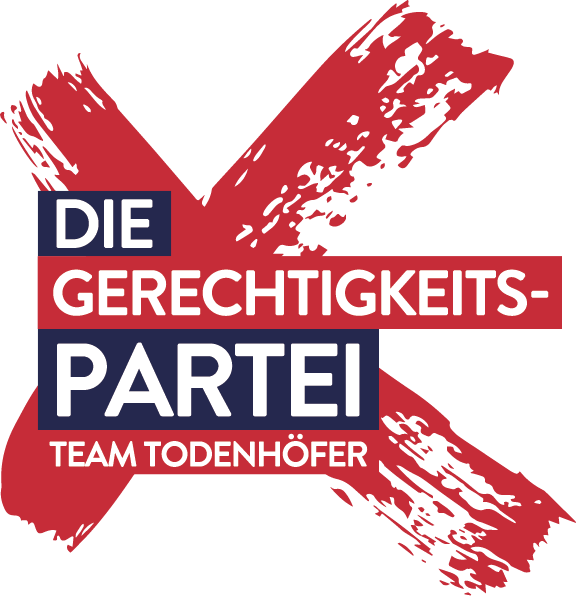
- Leader: Jürgen Todenhöfer
- Founded: 12 November 2020
- Headquarters: Munich
- Membership (2021): 5,341
- Ideology: Anti-militarism; Populism

Website
- https://www.diegerechtigkeitspartei.de/

The Justice Party – Team Todenhöfer (German: Die Gerechtigkeitspartei – Team Todenhöfer) is a political party in Germany, founded in 2020 by former Christian Democratic Union politician Jürgen Todenhöfer. The party opposes foreign missions by the Bundeswehr, proposes two-term limits for the Bundestag and government ministers, and supports the reduction of the public service and cutting taxes.

Todenhöfer terminated his CDU membership and launched the party on 12 November 2020, his eightieth birthday. Team Todenhöfer ran in the federal election as well as state elections in Berlin and Mecklenburg-Vorpommern, all of which took place on 26 September 2021. Ahead of the elections, Todenhöfer declared himself Chancellor candidate and claimed that his party had "the youngest candidate list and the highest proportion of women". Der Spiegel classified Team Todenhöfer as a minor populist party.

Team Todenhöfer received support from organisations associated with the ruling Justice and Development Party (AKP) of Turkey, including the Turkish Radio and Television Corporation and the pro-Erdoğan German political party the Alliance for Innovation and Justice (BIG).

Team Todenhöfer ran in fifteen out of sixteen states in the federal election, and was the twelfth most-popular overall, winning 214,535 votes (0.5%) and no seats, which enabled it to get state-funded party financing.

The party had 5,314 members at the end of 2021 and finished the year with a loss of nearly €3.3 million.

After the Hamas-led October 7, 2023 attack on Israel, Todenhöfer took part in a pro-Palestinian rally in Cologne together with Querdenkern and conspiracy theorists, where, among other things, it was spread that only a few Jewish families would dominate the world. Todenhöfer himself claimed that people in Germany were living in an "opinion dictatorship". A representative of the NS Documentation Centre of the City of Cologne commented on the coming together of corona deniers, supporters and apologists of Vladimir Putin's expansive foreign policy, right-wing extremists, the Grassroots Democratic Party of Germany and Todenhöfer's party at this rally by saying "that hatred of Israel, which is mostly just [....] anti-Semitism is [...] the glue that brings these different groups together".

In September 2021, Mesut Özil, former German national football player and current public supporter of Turkish President Recep Tayyip Erdoğan, announced that he would vote for the Team Todenhöfer party in the 2021 German federal election.

== Election results ==
=== Federal parliament (Bundestag) ===
Election	Leader	Constituency		Party list		Seats	+/–	Government
Election	Leader	Votes	%	Votes	%	Seats	+/–	Government
2021	Jürgen Todenhöfer	5,422	0.01 (#25)	211,860	0.46 (#12)	0 / 735	New	Extra-parliamentary
2025	Jürgen Todenhöfer	9,757	0.02 (#18)	24,558	0.05 (#17)	0 / 630	0	Extra-parliamentary
