= Results of the 2017 German federal election =

2017 German federal election
- 24 September 2017
- All 709 seats in the Bundestag; 355 seats needed for a majority
- Turnout: 76.2% ▲4.7pp
Party	Leader	Vote %	Seats	+/–
CDU/CSU	Angela Merkel	32.9%	246	−65
SPD	Martin Schulz	20.5%	153	−40
AfD	A. Gauland/A. Weidel	12.6%	94	+94
FDP	Christian Lindner	10.7%	80	+80
Left	D. Bartsch/S. Wagenknecht	9.2%	69	+5
Greens	K. Göring-Eckardt/C. Özdemir	8.9%	67	+4
This lists parties that won seats. See the complete results below.
Results for the single-member constituencies
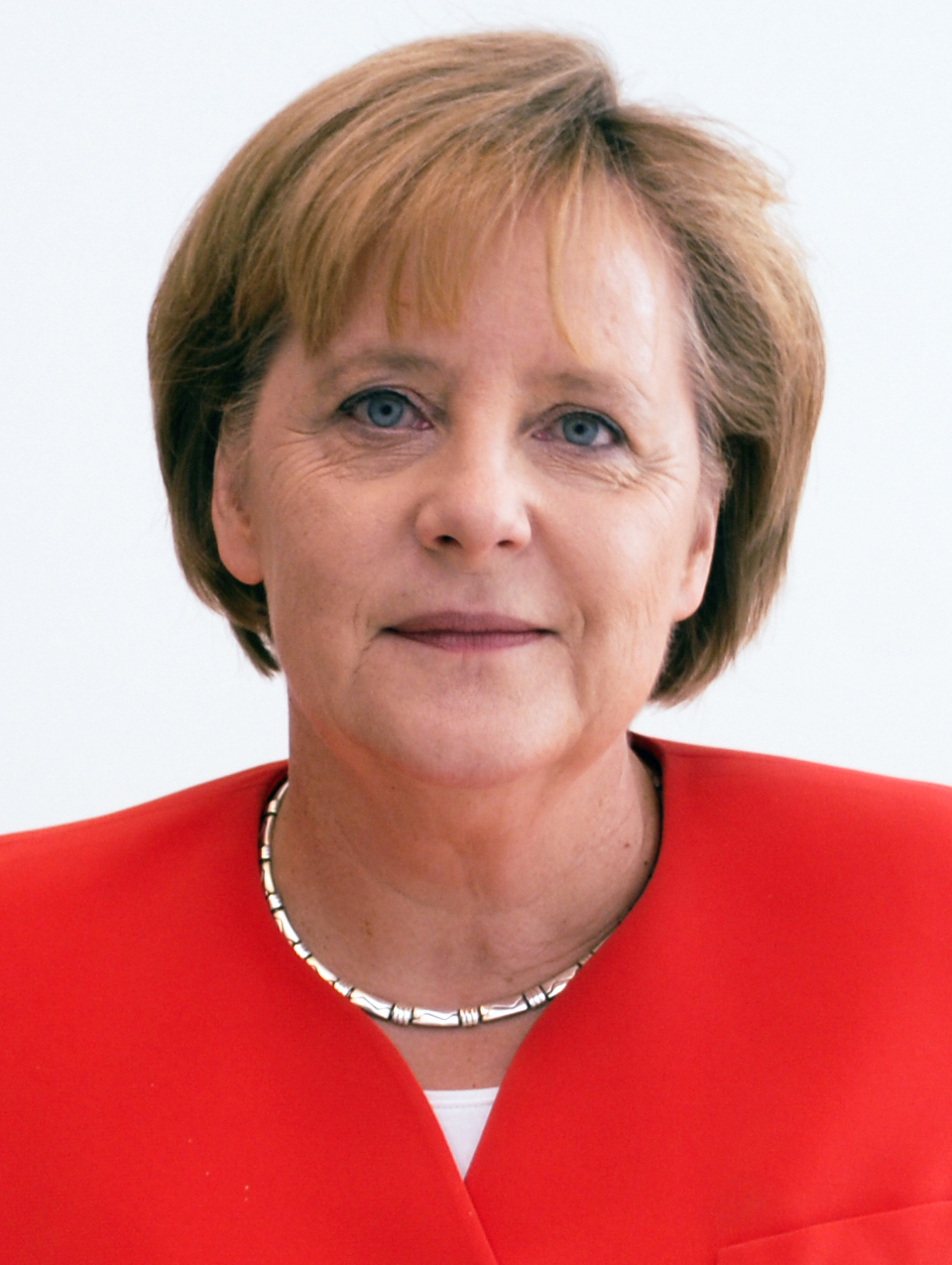

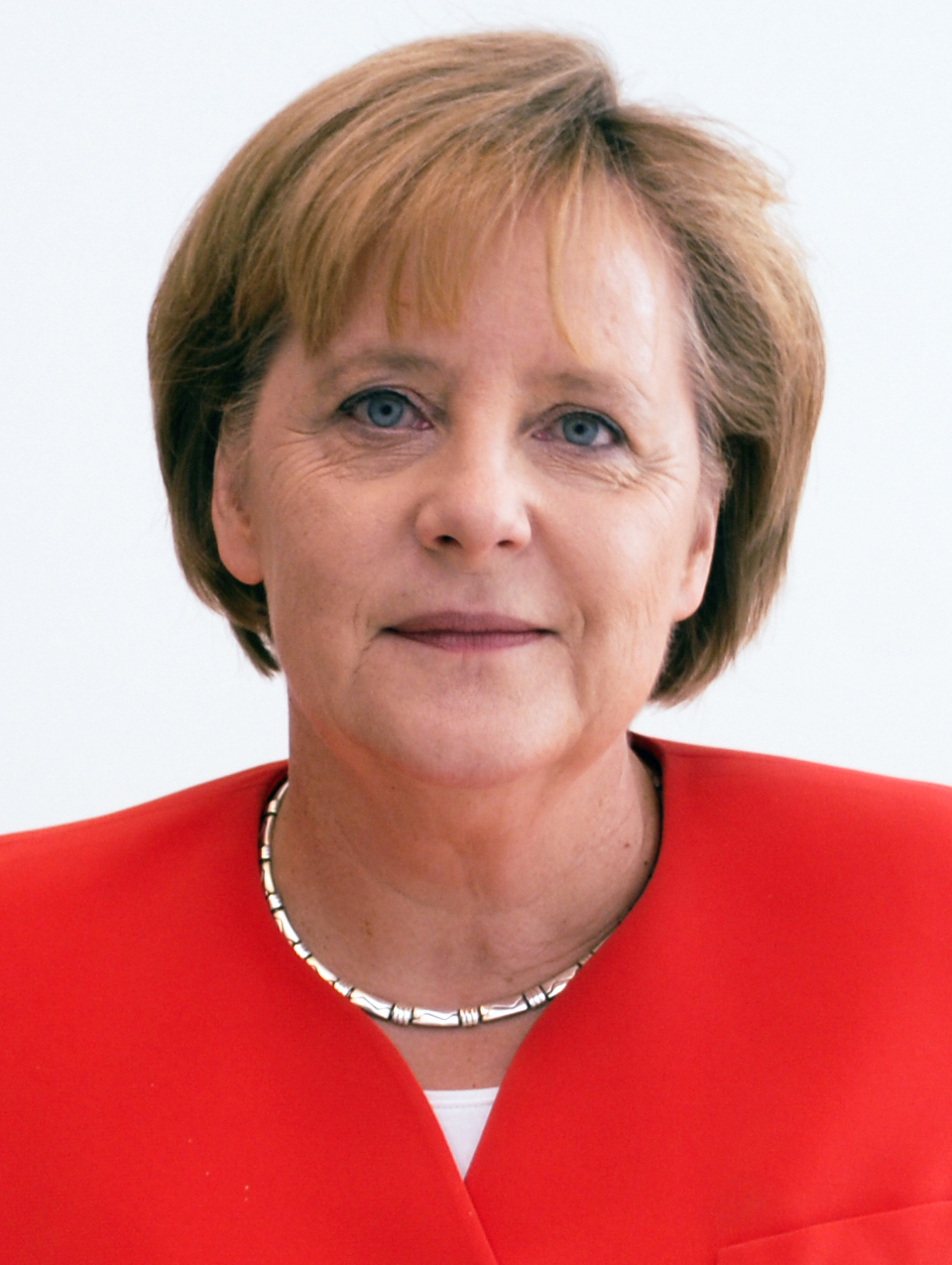
Chancellor before	Chancellor after
Angela Merkel; CDU/CSU	Angela Merkel; CDU/CSU

This is a breakdown of the results of the 2017 German federal election. The following tables display detailed results in each of the sixteen states and all 299 single-member constituencies.

== Electoral system ==
Germany uses the mixed-member proportional representation system, a system of proportional representation combined with elements of first-past-the-post voting. The Bundestag has 598 nominal members, elected for a four-year term; these seats are distributed between the sixteen German states in proportion to the states' population eligible to vote.

Every elector has two votes: a constituency and a list vote. 299 members are elected in single-member constituencies by first-past-the-post, based just on the first votes. The second votes are used to produce an overall proportional result in the states and then in the Bundestag. Seats are allocated using the Sainte-Laguë method. If a party wins fewer constituency seats in a state than its second votes would entitle it to, it receives additional seats from the relevant state list. Parties can file lists in each single state under certain conditions; for example, a fixed number of supporting signatures. Parties can receive second votes only in those states in which they have successfully filed a state list.

If a party by winning single-member constituencies in one state receives more seats than it would be entitled to according to its second vote share in that state (so-called overhang seats), the other parties receive compensation seats. Owing to this provision, the Bundestag usually has more than 598 members. The 18th Bundestag, for example, started with 631 seats: 598 regular and 33 overhang and compensation seats. Overhang seats are calculated at the state level, so many more seats are added to balance this out among the different states, adding more seats than would be needed to compensate for overhang at the national level in order to avoid negative vote weight.

In order to qualify for seats based on the party-list vote share, a party must either win three single-member constituencies or exceed a threshold of 5% of the second votes nationwide. If a party only wins one or two single-member constituencies and fails to get at least 5% of the second votes, it keeps the single-member seat(s), but other parties that accomplish at least one of the two threshold conditions receive compensation seats. (In the most recent example of this, during the 2002 election, the PDS won only 4.0% of the party-list votes nationwide, but won two constituencies in the state of Berlin.) The same applies if an independent candidate wins a single-member constituency (which has not happened since 1949). In the 2013 election, the FDP only won 4.8% of party-list votes; this cost it all of its seats in the Bundestag.

If a voter has cast a first vote for a successful independent candidate or a successful candidate whose party failed to qualify for proportional representation, their second vote does not count to determine proportional representation. However, it does count to determine whether the elected party has exceeded the 5% threshold.

Parties representing recognized national minorities (currently Danes, Frisians, Sorbs and Romani people) are exempt from the 5% threshold, but normally only run in state elections.

== Nationwide ==
Party	Constituency			Party list			Total seats	+/–
Party	Votes	%	Seats	Votes	%	Seats	Total seats	+/–
Christian Democratic Union (CDU) (Note: The Christian Democratic Union and the Christian Social Union of Bavaria call themselves sister parties. They do not compete against each other in the same states and they form one group within the Bundestag.)	14,030,751	30.2	185	12,447,656	26.8	15	200	−65
Social Democratic Party (SPD)	11,429,231	24.6	59	9,539,381	20.5	94	153	−40
Alternative for Germany (AfD) (Note: Including Frauke Petry, who will not take the AfD whip or sit with the party.)	5,317,499	11.5	3	5,878,115	12.6	91	94	+94
Free Democratic Party (FDP)	3,249,238	7.0	0	4,999,449	10.7	80	80	+80
The Left (DIE LINKE)	3,966,637	8.6	5	4,297,270	9.2	64	69	+5
Alliance 90/The Greens (GRÜNE)	3,717,922	8.0	1	4,158,400	8.9	66	67	+4
Christian Social Union (CSU)	3,255,487	7.0	46	2,869,688	6.2	0	46	−10
Free Voters (FREIE WÄHLER)	589,056	1.3	0	463,292	1.0	0	0	0
Die PARTEI	245,659	0.5	0	454,349	1.0	0	0	0
Human Environment Animal Protection Party	22,917	0.0	0	374,179	0.8	0	0	0
National Democratic Party (NPD)	45,169	0.1	0	176,020	0.4	0	0	0
Pirate Party Germany (PIRATEN)	93,196	0.2	0	173,476	0.4	0	0	0
Ecological Democratic Party (ÖDP)	166,228	0.4	0	144,809	0.3	0	0	0
Basic Income Alliance (BGE)	–	–	–	97,539	0.2	0	0	New
V-Partei³	1,201	0.0	0	64,073	0.1	0	0	New
German Centre (DM)	–	–	–	63,203	0.1	0	0	New
Democracy in Motion (DiB)	–	–	–	60,914	0.1	0	0	New
Bavaria Party (BP)	62,622	0.1	0	58,037	0.1	0	0	0
Alliance of German Democrats	–	–	–	41,251	0.1	0	0	New
Animal Protection Alliance (Tierschutzallianz)	6,114	0.0	0	32,221	0.1	0	0	New
Marxist–Leninist Party (MLPD)	35,760	0.1	0	29,785	0.1	0	0	0
Party for Health Research	1,537	0.0	0	23,404	0.1	0	0	New
Human World (MENSCHLICHE WELT)	2,205	0.0	0	11,661	0.0	0	0	New
German Communist Party (DKP)	7,517	0.0	0	11,558	0.0	0	0	0
The Greys (Die Grauen)	4,300	0.0	0	10,009	0.0	0	0	New
Democracy by Referendum (Volksabstimmung)	6,316	0.0	0	9,631	0.0	0	0	0
Civil Rights Movement Solidarity (BüSo)	15,960	0.0	0	6,693	0.0	0	0	0
The Humanists (Die Humanisten)	–	–	–	5,991	0.0	0	0	New
Magdeburg Garden Party (MG)	2,570	0.0	0	5,617	0.0	0	0	New
The Urbans. A HipHop Party (du.)	772	0.0	0	3,032	0.0	0	0	New
The Right (DIE RECHTE)	1,142	0.0	0	2,054	0.0	0	0	0
Socialist Equality Party (SGP)	903	0.0	0	1,291	0.0	0	0	0
Bergpartei, die "ÜberPartei" (B*)	672	0.0	0	911	0.0	0	0	0
Party of Reason (PDV)	242	0.0	0	533	0.0	0	0	0
Independents for Citizen-oriented Democracy	2,458	0.0	0	–	–	–	0	0
The Violets (DIE VIOLETTEN)	2,176	0.0	0	–	–	–	0	0
Alliance C – Christians for Germany	1,717	0.0	0	–	–	–	0	0
Renter's Party (MIETERPARTEI)	1,352	0.0	0	–	–	–	0	New
New Liberals (Neue Liberale)	884	0.0	0	–	–	–	0	New
Family Party (FAMILIE)	506	0.0	0	–	–	–	0	0
Feminist Party (DIE FRAUEN)	439	0.0	0	–	–	–	0	0
The Union (DIE EINHEIT)	371	0.0	0	–	–	–	0	New
Independents and voter groups	100,889	0.2	0	–	–	–	0	0
Valid votes	46,389,615	98.8	–	46,515,492	99.0	–	–	–
Invalid/blank votes	586,726	1.2	–	460,849	1.0	–	–	–
Total votes	46,976,341	100.0	299	46,976,341	100.0	410	709	+78
Registered voters/turnout	61,688,485	76.2	–	61,688,485	76.2	–	–	–
Source: Bundeswahlleiter

Popular vote
CDU/CSU	32.93%
SPD	20.51%
AfD	12.64%
FDP	10.75%
DIE LINKE	9.24%
GRÜNE	8.94%
Other	4.99%

Bundestag seats
CDU/CSU	34.70%
SPD	21.58%
AfD	13.26%
FDP	11.28%
DIE LINKE	9.73%
GRÜNE	9.45%

== Leaders' races ==
Party	Name	Constituency	Votes	%	Position	Elected?
CDU/CSU	Angela Merkel	Vorpommern-Rügen – Vorpommern-Greifswald I	73,746	44.0	1st	Elected
SPD	Martin Schulz	North Rhine-Westphalia party list			1st	Elected on list
AfD	Alexander Gauland	Frankfurt (Oder) – Oder-Spree	30,261	21.9	2nd	Elected on list
AfD	Alice Weidel	Bodensee	14,079	10.4	4th	Elected on list
FDP	Christian Lindner	Rheinisch-Bergischer Kreis	27,049	15.7	3rd	Elected on list
LINKE	Dietmar Bartsch	Rostock – Landkreis Rostock II	40,202	24.8	2nd	Elected on list
LINKE	Sahra Wagenknecht	Düsseldorf II	18,499	13.0	3rd	Elected on list
GRÜNE	Katrin Göring-Eckardt	Erfurt – Weimar – Weimarer Land II	11,722	7.1	5th	Elected on list
GRÜNE	Cem Özdemir	Stuttgart I	47,430	29.7	2nd	Elected on list

== By state ==
=== Summary ===
Winning party by constituency.

Results of the party list vote by state.

List seats by state.

Party list vote share by state
State	Union	SPD	AfD	FDP	Linke	Grüne	Others
Schleswig-Holstein	34.0	23.3	8.2	12.6	7.3	12.0	2.7
Mecklenburg-Vorpommern	33.1	15.1	18.6	6.2	17.8	4.3	4.9
Hamburg	27.2	23.5	7.8	10.8	12.2	13.9	4.5
Lower Saxony	34.9	27.4	9.1	9.3	6.9	8.7	3.6
Bremen	25.0	26.3	10.0	9.3	13.5	11.0	4.3
Brandenburg	26.7	17.6	20.2	7.1	17.2	5.0	6.3
Saxony-Anhalt	30.3	15.2	19.6	7.8	17.8	3.7	5.7
Berlin	22.7	17.9	12.0	8.9	18.8	12.6	7.0
North Rhine-Westphalia	32.6	26.0	9.4	13.1	7.5	7.6	3.8
Saxony	26.9	10.5	27.0	8.2	16.1	4.6	6.7
Hesse	30.9	23.5	11.9	11.6	8.1	9.7	4.4
Thuringia	28.8	13.2	22.7	7.8	16.9	4.1	6.5
Rhineland-Palatinate	35.9	24.2	11.2	10.4	6.8	7.6	3.9
Bavaria	38.8	15.3	12.4	10.2	6.1	9.8	7.5
Baden-Württemberg	34.4	16.4	12.2	12.7	6.4	13.5	4.5
Saarland	32.4	27.2	10.1	7.6	12.9	6.0	3.9

Seats by state
State	Distribution	Total
Schleswig-Holstein	2 / 6 / 3 / 3 / 10 / 2	26
Mecklenburg-Vorpommern	3 / 2 / 1 / 1 / 6 / 3	16
Hamburg	2 / 5 / 2 / 2 / 4 / 1	16
Lower Saxony	5 / 20 / 6 / 7 / 21 / 7	66
Bremen	1 / 2 / 1 / 1 / 1	6
Brandenburg	4 / 4 / 1 / 2 / 9 / 5	25
Saxony-Anhalt	4 / 3 / 1 / 2 / 9 / 4	23
Berlin	6 / 5 / 4 / 3 / 6 / 4	28
North Rhine-Westphalia	12 / 41 / 12 / 20 / 42 / 15	142
Saxony	6 / 4 / 2 / 3 / 12 / 11	38
Hesse	4 / 12 / 5 / 6 / 17 / 6	50
Thuringia	3 / 3 / 1 / 2 / 8 / 5	22
Rhineland-Palatinate	3 / 9 / 3 / 4 / 14 / 4	37
Bavaria	7 / 18 / 11 / 12 / 46 / 14	108
Baden-Württemberg	6 / 16 / 13 / 12 / 38 / 11	96
Saarland	1 / 3 / 1 / 1 / 3 / 1	10
Germany	69 / 153 / 67 / 80 / 246 / 94	709

=== Schleswig-Holstein ===
Party	Constituency			Party list			Total seats	+/–
Party	Votes	%	Seats	Votes	%	Seats	Total seats	+/–
Christian Democratic Union (CDU)	682,287	39.8	10	583,135	34.0	0	10	−1
Social Democratic Party (SPD)	493,279	28.8	1	399,505	23.3	5	6	−3
Free Democratic Party (FDP)	131,703	7.7	0	216,844	12.6	3	3	+3
Alliance 90/The Greens (GRÜNE)	163,580	9.5	0	205,471	12.0	3	3	0
Alternative for Germany (AfD)	128,641	7.5	0	140,362	8.2	2	2	+2
The Left (DIE LINKE)	90,574	5.3	0	124,678	7.3	2	2	+1
Die PARTEI	4,017	0.2	0	20,732	1.2	0	0	0
Free Voters	15,957	0.9	0	11,095	0.6	0	0	0
Basic Income Alliance	–	–	–	5,670	0.3	0	0	New
National Democratic Party	–	–	–	4,210	0.2	0	0	0
Ecological Democratic Party	–	–	–	3,116	0.2	0	0	0
Marxist–Leninist Party	1,381	0.1	0	823	0.0	0	0	0
Family Party	506	0.0	0	–	–	–	0	0
New Liberals	342	0.0	0	–	–	–	0	New
Others & Independents	755	0.0	0	–	–	–	0	–
Invalid/blank votes	16,172	–	–	13,553	–	–	–	–
Total	1,729,194	100	11	1,729,194	100	15	26	+2
Registered voters/turnout	2,266,012	76.3	–	2,266,012	76.3	–	–	–
Source: Federal Returning Officer

Constituency members
#	Constituency	Previous member	Elected member	Party	Votes	%	Margin	Runner-up
1	Flensburg – Schleswig	Sabine Sütterlin-Waack	Petra Nicolaisen	CDU	68,120	40.0	20,409	Clemens Teschendorf
2	Nordfriesland – Dithmarschen Nord	Ingbert Liebing	Astrid Damerow	CDU	62,256	45.1	27,571	Matthias Ilgen
3	Steinburg – Dithmarschen Süd	Mark Helfrich	Mark Helfrich	CDU	54,812	41.9	20,593	Karin Thissen
4	Rendsburg-Eckernförde	Johann Wadephul	Johann Wadephul	CDU	66,625	42.7	21,555	Sönke Rix
5	Kiel	Hans-Peter Bartels	Mathias Stein	SPD	46,991	31.0	431	Thomas Stritzl
6	Plön – Neumünster	Philipp Murmann	Melanie Bernstein	CDU	53,109	40.7	15,381	Birgit Malecha-Nissen
7	Pinneberg	Ole Schröder	Michael von Abercron	CDU	73,816	39.7	17,356	Ernst Dieter Rossmann
8	Segeberg – Stormarn-Mitte	Gero Storjohann	Gero Storjohann	CDU	78,824	41.1	26,390	Alexander Wagner
9	Ostholstein – Stormarn-Nord	Ingo Gädechens	Ingo Gädechens	CDU	56,996	41.5	14,764	Bettina Hagedorn
10	Herzogtum Lauenburg – Stormarn-Süd	Norbert Brackmann	Norbert Brackmann	CDU	75,737	39.5	23,566	Nina Scheer
11	Lübeck	Gabriele Hiller-Ohm	Claudia Schmidtke	CDU	45,432	35.3	1,854	Gabriele Hiller-Ohm

List members
SPD	FDP	GRÜNE
1. Bettina Hagedorn (1); 2. Sönke Rix (2); 3. Nina Scheer (3); 4. Ernst Dieter Rossmann (4); 5. Gabriele Hiller-Ohm (5)	1. Wolfgang Kubicki (1); 2. ~~Bernd Klaus Buchholz (2)~~ (Note: Buchholz declined his mandate after the election.); 3. Christine Aschenberg-Dugnus (3); 4. Gyde Jensen (4)	1. Luise Amtsberg (1); 2. Konstantin von Notz (2); 3. Ingrid Nestle (3)
AfD	LINKE	
1. Bruno Hollnagel (1); 2. Axel Gehrke (2)	1. Cornelia Möhring (1); 2. Lorenz Gösta Beutin (2)	

=== Mecklenburg-Vorpommern ===
Party	Constituency			Party list			Total seats	+/–
Party	Votes	%	Seats	Votes	%	Seats	Total seats	+/–
Christian Democratic Union (CDU)	316,662	34.2	6	307,263	33.1	0	6	0
Alternative for Germany (AfD)	168,456	18.2	0	172,409	18.6	3	3	+3
The Left (DIE LINKE)	171,130	18.5	0	165,368	17.8	3	3	0
Social Democratic Party (SPD)	161,437	17.4	0	139,689	15.1	2	2	−1
Free Democratic Party (FDP)	43,899	4.7	0	57,895	6.2	1	1	+1
Alliance 90/The Greens (GRÜNE)	33,746	3.6	0	39,514	4.3	1	1	0
Human Environment Animal Protection Party	2,161	0.2	0	12,507	1.3	0	0	0
National Democratic Party	7,977	0.9	0	10,408	1.1	0	0	0
Die PARTEI	4,631	0.5	0	9,309	1.0	0	0	0
Free Voters	13,794	1.5	0	7,543	0.8	0	0	0
Basic Income Alliance	–	–	–	3,034	0.3	0	0	New
Marxist–Leninist Party	1,666	0.2	0	1,366	0.1	0	0	0
Ecological Democratic Party	591	0.1	0	1,205	0.1	0	0	0
Others & Independents	695	0.1	0	–	–	–	0	–
Invalid/blank votes	11,742	–	–	11,077	–	–	–	–
Total	938,587	100	6	938,587	100	10	16	+3
Registered voters/turnout	1,324,614	70.9	–	1,324,614	70.9	–	–	–
Source: Federal Returning Officer

Constituency members
#	Constituency	Previous member	Elected member	Party	Votes	%	Margin	Runner-up
12	Schwerin – Ludwigslust-Parchim I – Nordwestmecklenburg I	Dietrich Monstadt	Dietrich Monstadt	CDU	49,733	32.1	15,466	Martina Tegtmeier
13	Ludwigslust-Parchim II – Nordwestmecklenburg II – Landkreis Rostock I	Karin Strenz	Karin Strenz	CDU	43,453	30.0	8,748	Frank Junge
14	Rostock – Landkreis Rostock II	Peter Stein	Peter Stein	CDU	47,923	29.5	7,721	Dietmar Bartsch
15	Vorpommern-Rügen – Vorpommern-Greifswald I	Angela Merkel	Angela Merkel	CDU	73,746	44.0	41,573	Leif-Erik Holm
16	Mecklenburgische Seenplatte I – Vorpommern-Greifswald II	Matthias Lietz	Philipp Amthor	CDU	48,269	31.2	11,996	Enrico Komning
17	Mecklenburgische Seenplatte II – Landkreis Rostock III	Eckhardt Rehberg	Eckhardt Rehberg	CDU	53,538	37.6	27,339	Ulrike Schielke-Ziesing

List members
AfD	LINKE	SPD
1. Leif-Erik Holm (1); 2. Enrico Komning (2); 3. Ulrike Schielke-Ziesing (3)	1. Dietmar Bartsch (1); 2. Heidrun Bluhm (2); 3. Kerstin Kassner (3)	1. Sonja Steffen (1); 2. Frank Junge (2)
FDP	GRÜNE	
1. Hagen Reinhold (1)	1. Claudia Müller (1)	

=== Hamburg ===
Party	Constituency			Party list			Total seats	+/–
Party	Votes	%	Seats	Votes	%	Seats	Total seats	+/–
Christian Democratic Union (CDU)	277,677	28.5	1	266,312	27.2	3	4	−1
Social Democratic Party (SPD)	311,889	32.0	5	229,862	23.5	0	5	0
Alliance 90/The Greens (GRÜNE)	114,485	11.7	0	136,371	13.9	2	2	0
The Left (DIE LINKE)	105,242	10.8	0	119,076	12.2	2	2	+1
Free Democratic Party (FDP)	69,178	7.1	0	105,610	10.7	2	2	+2
Alternative for Germany (AfD)	71,527	7.3	0	76,511	7.8	1	1	+1
Die PARTEI	11,426	1.2	0	15,388	1.6	0	0	0
Human Environment Animal Protection Party	–	–	–	8,813	0.9	0	0	0
Basic Income Alliance	–	–	–	4,573	0.5	0	0	New
Democracy in Motion	–	–	–	4,199	0.4	0	0	New
Free Voters	5,426	0.6	0	3,458	0.4	0	0	0
Ecological Democratic Party	3,369	0.3	0	2,778	0.3	0	0	0
V-Partei³	–	–	–	2,169	0.2	0	0	New
National Democratic Party	1,245	0.1	0	1,799	0.2	0	0	0
Marxist–Leninist Party	1,123	0.1	0	688	0.1	0	0	0
German Communist Party	–	–	–	511	0.1	0	0	New
Others & Independents	3,085	0.3	0	–	–	–	0	–
Invalid/blank votes	9,254	–	–	6,808	–	–	–	–
Total	984,926	100	6	984,926	100	10	16	+3
Registered voters/turnout	1,296,656	76.0	–	1,296,656	76.0	–	–	–
Source: Federal Returning Officer

Constituency members
#	Constituency	Previous member	Elected member	Party	Votes	%	Margin	Runner-up
18	Hamburg-Mitte	Johannes Kahrs	Johannes Kahrs	SPD	53,795	30.9	11,646	Christoph de Vries
19	Hamburg-Altona	Matthias Bartke	Matthias Bartke	SPD	41,947	28.9	4,372	Marcus Weinberg
20	Hamburg-Eimsbüttel	Niels Annen	Niels Annen	SPD	48,920	31.6	4,504	Rüdiger Kruse
21	Hamburg-Nord	Dirk Fischer	Christoph Ploß	CDU	59,441	33.5	4,746	Dorothee Martin
22	Hamburg-Wandsbek	Aydan Özoğuz	Aydan Özoğuz	SPD	59,086	34.6	8,264	Eckhard Graage
23	Hamburg-Bergedorf – Harburg	Metin Hakverdi	Metin Hakverdi	SPD	53,446	34.8	10,172	Herlind Gundelach

List members
CDU	GRÜNE	LINKE
1. Marcus Weinberg (1); 2. Rüdiger Kruse (2); 3. Christoph de Vries (3)	1. Anja Hajduk (1); 2. Manuel Sarrazin (2)	1. Fabio De Masi (1); 2. Żaklin Nastić (2)
FDP	AfD	
1. Katja Suding (1); 2. Wieland Schinnenburg (2)	1. Bernd Baumann (1)	

=== Lower Saxony ===
Party	Constituency			Party list			Total seats	+/–
Party	Votes	%	Seats	Votes	%	Seats	Total seats	+/–
Christian Democratic Union (CDU)	1,777,588	38.3	16	1,623,481	34.9	5	21	−10
Social Democratic Party (SPD)	1,557,197	33.6	14	1,275,172	27.4	6	20	−5
Free Democratic Party (FDP)	264,801	5.7	0	431,405	9.3	7	7	+7
Alternative for Germany (AfD)	369,663	8.0	0	422,362	9.1	7	7	+7
Alliance 90/The Greens (GRÜNE)	334,541	7.2	0	404,825	8.7	6	6	0
The Left (DIE LINKE)	273,064	5.9	0	322,979	7.0	5	5	+1
Die PARTEI	12,726	0.3	0	41,228	0.9	0	0	0
Human Environment Animal Protection Party	–	–	–	40,487	0.9	0	0	0
Free Voters	23,538	0.5	0	19,178	0.4	0	0	0
Pirate Party Germany	13,214	0.3	0	17,683	0.4	0	0	0
National Democratic Party	–	–	–	12,034	0.3	0	0	0
German Centre	–	–	–	8,146	0.2	0	0	New
Basic Income Alliance	–	–	–	8,084	0.2	0	0	New
Democracy in Motion	–	–	–	6,349	0.1	0	0	New
V-Partei³	–	–	–	6,076	0.1	0	0	New
Ecological Democratic Party	809	0.0	0	4,771	0.1	0	0	0
Marxist–Leninist Party	1,522	0.0	0	1,616	0.0	0	0	0
German Communist Party	1,331	0.0	0	1,100	0.0	0	0	New
Alliance C – Christians for Germany	953	0.0	0	–	–	–	0	New
Others & Independents	4,370	0.1	0	–	–	–	0	–
Invalid/blank votes	46,554	–	–	34,895	–	–	–	–
Total	4,681,871	100	30	4,681,871	100	36	66	0
Registered voters/turnout	6,124,582	76.4	–	6,124,582	76.4	–	–	–
Source: Federal Returning Officer

Constituency members
#	Constituency	Previous member	Elected member	Party	Votes	%	Margin	Runner-up
24	Aurich – Emden	Johann Saathoff	Johann Saathoff	SPD	69,231	49.6	30,700	Reinhard Hegewald
25	Unterems	Gitta Connemann	Gitta Connemann	CDU	87,406	50.0	38,447	Markus Paschke
26	Friesland – Wilhelmshaven – Wittmund	Karin Evers-Meyer	Siemtje Möller	SPD	54,504	39.7	9,967	Hans-Werner Kammer
27	Oldenburg – Ammerland	Dennis Rohde	Dennis Rohde	SPD	63,235	36.3	10,637	Stephan Albani
28	Delmenhorst – Wesermarsch – Oldenburg-Land	Astrid Grotelüschen	Astrid Grotelüschen	CDU	57,390	34.1	2,064	Susanne Mittag
29	Cuxhaven – Stade II	Enak Ferlemann	Enak Ferlemann	CDU	59,930	42.7	16,853	Susanne Puvogel
30	Stade I – Rotenburg II	Oliver Grundmann	Oliver Grundmann	CDU	67,463	44.4	24,634	Oliver Kellmer
31	Mittelems	Albert Stegemann	Albert Stegemann	CDU	95,815	53.6	48,708	Daniela De Ridder
32	Cloppenburg – Vechta	Franz-Josef Holzenkamp	Silvia Breher	CDU	93,545	57.7	60,548	Kristian Kater
33	Diepholz – Nienburg I	Axel Knoerig	Axel Knoerig	CDU	65,465	44.6	25,363	Tevfik Özkan
34	Osterholz – Verden	Andreas Mattfeldt	Andreas Mattfeldt	CDU	59,560	39.2	11,055	Christina Jantz-Herrmann
35	Rotenburg I – Heidekreis	Reinhard Grindel	Lars Klingbeil	SPD	51,938	41.2	6,428	Kathrin Rösel
36	Harburg	Michael Grosse-Brömer	Michael Grosse-Brömer	CDU	65,223	40.6	21,206	Svenja Stadler
37	Lüchow-Dannenberg – Lüneburg	Eckhard Pols	Eckhard Pols	CDU	46,740	33.5	7,571	Hiltrud Lotze
38	Osnabrück-Land	André Berghegger	André Berghegger	CDU	68,379	45.6	25,941	Rainer Spiering
39	Stadt Osnabrück	Mathias Middelberg	Mathias Middelberg	CDU	60,185	40.3	12,906	Antje Schulte-Schoh
40	Nienburg II – Schaumburg	Sebastian Edathy	Maik Beermann	CDU	59,128	40.6	11,513	Marja-Liisa Völlers
41	Stadt Hannover I	Kerstin Tack	Kerstin Tack	SPD	47,549	35.6	8,062	Maximilian Oppelt
42	Stadt Hannover II	Edelgard Bulmahn	Yasmin Fahimi	SPD	49,744	33.7	7,031	Ursula von der Leyen
43	Hannover-Land I	Hendrik Hoppenstedt	Hendrik Hoppenstedt	CDU	72,282	40.1	12,730	Caren Marks
44	Celle – Uelzen	Henning Otte	Henning Otte	CDU	68,655	42.7	20,466	Kirsten Lühmann
45	Gifhorn – Peine	Hubertus Heil	Hubertus Heil	SPD	63,294	37.8	2,949	Ingrid Pahlmann
46	Hameln-Pyrmont – Holzminden	Gabriele Lösekrug-Möller	Johannes Schraps	SPD	54,130	39.1	7,949	Michael Vietz
47	Hannover-Land II	Matthias Miersch	Matthias Miersch	SPD	69,104	37.0	3,289	Maria Flachsbarth
48	Hildesheim	Ute Bertram	Bernd Westphal	SPD	62,448	37.2	1,991	Ute Bertram
49	Salzgitter – Wolfenbüttel	Sigmar Gabriel	Sigmar Gabriel	SPD	66,587	42.8	21,277	Uwe Lagosky
50	Braunschweig	Carola Reimann	Carola Reimann	SPD	55,641	38.0	9,760	Carsten Müller
51	Helmstedt – Wolfsburg	Günter Lach	Falko Mohrs	SPD	51,646	38.0	4,230	Günter Lach
52	Goslar – Northeim – Osterode	Wilhelm Priesmeier	Roy Kühne	CDU	59,391	39.8	7,438	Marcus Seidel
53	Göttingen	Thomas Oppermann	Thomas Oppermann	SPD	59,032	34.9	2,782	Fritz Güntzler

List members
FDP	AfD	SPD
1. Christian Dürr (1); 2. Jens Beeck (2); 3. Grigorios Aggelidis (3); 4. Gero Clemens Hocker (4); 5. Ulla Ihnen (5); 6. Konstantin Kuhle (6); 7. Matthias Seestern-Pauly (7)	1. Armin-Paul Hampel (1); 2. Jörn König (2); 3. Thomas Ehrhorn (3); 4. Wilhelm von Gottberg (4); 5. Dietmar Friedhoff (5); 6. Jens Kestner (6); 7. Waldemar Herdt (7)	1. Susanne Mittag (2); 2. Daniela De Ridder (4); 3. Caren Marks (6); 4. Svenja Stadler (8); 5. Rainer Spiering (9); 6. Kirsten Lühmann (10)
GRÜNE	CDU	LINKE
1. Julia Verlinden (1); 2. Jürgen Trittin (2); 3. Filiz Polat (3); 4. Sven-Christian Kindler (4); 5. Katja Keul (5); 6. Ottmar von Holtz (6)	1. Ursula von der Leyen (1); 2. Maria Flachsbarth (4); 3. Stephan Albani (6); 4. Carsten Müller (8); 5. Fritz Güntzler (9)	1. Pia Zimmermann (1); 2. Diether Dehm (2); 3. Jutta Krellmann (3); 4. Victor Perli (4); 5. Amira Mohamed Ali (5)

=== Bremen ===
Party	Constituency			Party list			Total seats	+/–
Party	Votes	%	Seats	Votes	%	Seats	Total seats	+/–
Social Democratic Party (SPD)	105,119	31.8	2	88,944	26.8	0	2	0
Christian Democratic Union (CDU)	81,275	24.6	0	83,409	25.1	1	1	−1
The Left (DIE LINKE)	39,405	11.9	0	44,629	13.4	1	1	0
Alliance 90/The Greens (GRÜNE)	33,386	10.1	0	36,733	11.1	1	1	0
Alternative for Germany (AfD)	30,935	9.3	0	33,244	10.0	1	1	+1
Free Democratic Party (FDP)	30,457	9.2	0	31,056	9.3	0	0	0
Die PARTEI	7,753	2.3	0	5,511	1.7	0	0	0
Pirate Party Germany	–	–	–	1,958	0.6	0	0	0
Basic Income Alliance	–	–	–	1,804	0.5	0	0	New
V-Partei³	–	–	–	1,019	0.3	0	0	New
Human World	787	0.2	0	905	0.3	0	0	New
National Democratic Party	487	0.1	0	863	0.3	0	0	0
German Centre	–	–	–	607	0.2	0	0	New
Marxist–Leninist Party	500	0.2	0	273	0.1	0	0	0
German Communist Party	–	–	–	174	0.1	0	0	New
Invalid/blank votes	4,876	–	–	3,596	–	–	–	–
Total	335,919	100	2	335,919	100	4	6	0
Registered voters/turnout	474,151	70.8	–	474,151	70.8	–	–	–
Source: Federal Returning Officer

Constituency members
#	Constituency	Previous member	Elected member	Party	Votes	%	Margin	Runner-up
54	Bremen I	Carsten Sieling	Sarah Ryglewski	SPD	55,656	30.0	10,744	Elisabeth Motschmann
55	Bremen II – Bremerhaven	Uwe Beckmeyer	Uwe Schmidt	SPD	49,463	34.0	13,100	Bettina Hornhues

List members
CDU	LINKE
1. Elisabeth Motschmann (1)	1. Doris Achelwilm (1)
GRÜNE	AfD
1. Kirsten Kappert-Gonther (1)	1. Frank Magnitz (1)

=== Brandenburg ===
Party	Constituency			Party list			Total seats	+/–
Party	Votes	%	Seats	Votes	%	Seats	Total seats	+/–
Christian Democratic Union (CDU)	432,157	29.0	9	397,839	26.7	0	9	0
Alternative for Germany (AfD)	289,204	19.4	0	301,103	20.2	5	5	+5
Social Democratic Party (SPD)	304,896	20.5	1	261,822	17.6	3	4	−1
The Left (DIE LINKE)	256,497	17.2	0	255,721	17.2	4	4	−1
Free Democratic Party (FDP)	75,734	5.1	0	105,485	7.1	2	2	+2
Alliance 90/The Greens (GRÜNE)	67,253	4.5	0	74,971	5.0	1	1	0
Human Environment Animal Protection Party	–	–	–	26,243	1.8	0	0	0
Die PARTEI	17,385	1.2	0	19,471	1.3	0	0	0
Free Voters	28,547	1.9	0	17,762	1.2	0	0	0
National Democratic Party	1,369	0.1	0	12,993	0.9	0	0	0
Basic Income Alliance	–	–	–	6,066	0.4	0	0	New
German Centre	–	–	–	5,068	0.3	0	0	New
German Communist Party	4,668	0.3	0	2,514	0.2	0	0	New
Ecological Democratic Party	–	–	–	2,496	0.2	0	0	0
Marxist–Leninist Party	772	0.1	0	1,277	0.1	0	0	0
Pirate Party Germany	4,925	0.3	0	–	–	–	0	0
Others & Independents	4,995	0.3	0	–	–	–	0	–
Invalid/blank votes	23,743	–	–	21,314	–	–	–	–
Total	1,512,145	100	10	1,512,145	100	15	25	+5
Registered voters/turnout	2,051,559	73.7	–	2,051,559	73.7	–	–	–
Source: Federal Returning Officer

Constituency members
#	Constituency	Previous member	Elected member	Party	Votes	%	Margin	Runner-up
56	Prignitz – Ostprignitz-Ruppin – Havelland I	Sebastian Steineke	Sebastian Steineke	CDU	36,481	30.8	8,420	Dagmar Ziegler
57	Uckermark – Barnim I	Jens Koeppen	Jens Koeppen	CDU	39,102	30.6	13,298	Steffen John
58	Oberhavel – Havelland II	Uwe Feiler	Uwe Feiler	CDU	54,455	29.9	13,032	Benjamin Grimm
59	Märkisch-Oderland – Barnim II	Hans-Georg von der Marwitz	Hans-Georg von der Marwitz	CDU	47,594	28.4	9,873	Kerstin Kühn
60	Brandenburg an der Havel – Potsdam-Mittelmark I – Havelland III – Teltow-Fläming I	Frank-Walter Steinmeier	Dietlind Tiemann	CDU	39,991	31.8	8,443	Erardo Rautenberg
61	Potsdam – Potsdam-Mittelmark II – Teltow-Fläming II	Katherina Reiche	Manja Schüle	SPD	50,588	26.1	2,493	Saskia Ludwig
62	Dahme-Spreewald – Teltow-Fläming III – Oberspreewald-Lausitz I	Jana Schimke	Jana Schimke	CDU	56,607	30.7	19,249	Dietmar Ertel
63	Frankfurt (Oder) – Oder-Spree	Martin Patzelt	Martin Patzelt	CDU	37,344	27.1	7,083	Alexander Gauland
64	Cottbus – Spree-Neiße	Klaus-Peter Schulze	Klaus-Peter Schulze	CDU	36,855	28.4	4,079	Marianne Spring-Räumschüssel
65	Elbe-Elster – Oberspreewald-Lausitz II	Michael Stübgen	Michael Stübgen	CDU	35,633	29.5	5,803	Peter Holger Drenske

List members
AfD	LINKE	SPD
1. Alexander Gauland (1); 2. Roman Reusch (2); 3. René Springer (3); 4. Steffen Kotré (4); 5. Norbert Kleinwächter (5)	1. Kirsten Tackmann (1); 2. Thomas Nord (2); 3. Anke Domscheit-Berg (3); 4. Norbert Müller (4)	1. Dagmar Ziegler (1); 2. Ulrich Freese (2); 3. Stefan Zierke (3)
FDP	GRÜNE	
1. Linda Teuteberg (1); 2. Martin Neumann (2)	1. Annalena Baerbock (1)	

=== Saxony-Anhalt ===
Party	Constituency			Party list			Total seats	+/–
Party	Votes	%	Seats	Votes	%	Seats	Total seats	+/–
Christian Democratic Union (CDU)	401,454	32.4	9	377,411	30.3	0	9	0
Alternative for Germany (AfD)	210,127	16.9	0	244,401	19.6	4	4	+4
The Left (DIE LINKE)	238,047	19.2	0	220,858	17.7	4	4	−1
Social Democratic Party (SPD)	213,058	17.2	0	188,980	15.2	3	3	−1
Free Democratic Party (FDP)	81,211	6.5	0	96,555	7.8	2	2	+2
Alliance 90/The Greens (GRÜNE)	38,938	3.1	0	46,243	3.7	1	1	0
Animal Protection Alliance	4,102	0.3	0	18,715	1.5	0	0	New
Free Voters	28,163	2.3	0	14,392	1.2	0	0	0
Die PARTEI	2,186	0.2	0	13,554	1.1	0	0	0
National Democratic Party	15,364	1.2	0	9,737	0.8	0	0	0
Magdeburger Garden Party	2,570	0.2	0	5,617	0.5	0	0	New
Basic Income Alliance	–	–	–	3,762	0.3	0	0	New
Democracy in Motion	–	–	–	2,08	0.2	0	0	New
Marxist–Leninist Party	2,039	0.2	0	1,847	0.1	0	0	0
Others & Independents	3,266	0.3	0	–	–	–	0	–
Invalid/blank votes	22,949	–	–	18,494	–	–	–	–
Total	1,263,474	100	9	1,263,474	100	14	23	+4
Registered voters/turnout	1,854,891	68.1	–	1,854,891	68.1	–	–	–
Source: Federal Returning Officer

Constituency members
#	Constituency	Previous member	Elected member	Party	Votes	%	Margin	Runner-up
66	Altmark	Jörg Hellmuth	Eckhard Gnodtke	CDU	35,644	32.6	14,671	Matthias Höhn
67	Börde – Jerichower Land	Manfred Behrens	Manfred Behrens	CDU	55,110	37.8	25,494	Kerstin Auerbach
68	Harz	Heike Brehmer	Heike Brehmer	CDU	51,386	36.4	24,282	Evelyn Edler
69	Magdeburg	Tino Sorge	Tino Sorge	CDU	44,021	27.4	9,144	Burkhard Lischka
70	Dessau – Wittenberg	Ulrich Petzold	Sepp Müller	CDU	42,781	35.2	19,261	Andreas Mrosek
71	Anhalt	Kees de Vries	Kees de Vries	CDU	45,843	31.6	13,562	Kai-Uwe Ziegler
72	Halle	Christoph Bergner	Christoph Bernstiel	CDU	40,690	27.1	8,637	Karamba Diaby
73	Burgenland – Saalekreis	Dieter Stier	Dieter Stier	CDU	43,254	33.6	13,142	Uwe Gewiese
74	Mansfeld	Uda Heller	Torsten Schweiger	CDU	42,725	31.0	9,861	Uwe Scheidemann

List members
AfD	LINKE	SPD
1. Martin Reichardt (1); 2. Frank Pasemann (2); 3. Matthias Büttner (3); 4. Andreas Mrosek (4)	1. Petra Sitte (1); 2. Jan Korte (2); 3. Birke Bull-Bischoff (3); 4. Matthias Höhn (4)	1. Burkhard Lischka (1); 2. Katrin Budde (2); 3. Karamba Diaby (3)
FDP	GRÜNE	
1. Frank Sitta (1); 2. Marcus Faber (2)	1. Steffi Lemke (1)	

=== Berlin ===
Party	Constituency			Party list			Total seats	+/–
Party	Votes	%	Seats	Votes	%	Seats	Total seats	+/–
Christian Democratic Union (CDU)	460,296	24.7	4	424,321	22.7	2	6	−3
The Left (DIE LINKE)	377,564	20.2	4	351,170	18.8	2	6	0
Social Democratic Party (SPD)	391,772	21.0	3	334,253	17.9	2	5	−3
Alliance 90/The Greens (GRÜNE)	230,935	12.4	1	234,947	12.6	3	4	0
Alternative for Germany (AfD)	212,211	11.4	0	225,170	12.0	4	4	+4
Free Democratic Party (FDP)	105,053	5.6	0	167,046	8.9	3	3	+3
Die PARTEI	53,335	2.9	0	39,027	2.1	0	0	0
Human Environment Animal Protection Party	–	–	–	25,415	1.4	0	0	0
Pirate Party Germany	3,005	0.2	0	10,894	0.6	0	0	0
The Greys	4,300	0.2	0	10,009	0.5	0	0	New
Democracy in Motion	–	–	–	7,467	0.4	0	0	New
Basic Income Alliance	–	–	–	6,926	0.4	0	0	New
Free Voters	5,720	0.3	0	5,354	0.3	0	0	0
Party for Health Research	1,537	0.1	0	4,832	0.3	0	0	New
German Centre	–	–	–	4,212	0.2	0	0	New
Ecological Democratic Party	2,663	0.1	0	3,206	0.2	0	0	0
Human World	766	0.0	0	3,144	0.2	0	0	New
The Urbans	772	0.0	0	3,032	0.2	0	0	New
V-Partei³	–	–	–	2,733	0.1	0	0	New
German Communist Party	–	–	–	1,685	0.1	0	0	New
Marxist–Leninist Party	1,843	0.1	0	1,617	0.1	0	0	0
Civil Rights Movement Solidarity	3,033	0.2	0	1,198	0.1	0	0	0
Bergpartei, die "ÜberPartei"	672	0.0	0	911	0.0	0	0	New
Socialist Equality Party	472	0.0	0	473	0.0	0	0	0
National Democratic Party	1,951	0.1	0	–	–	–	0	0
Renter's Party	1,352	0.1	0	–	–	–	0	New
The Women	439	0.0	0	–	–	–	0	New
Others & Independents	5,783	0.3	0	–	–	–	0	–
Invalid/blank votes	26,660	–	–	23,092	–	–	–	–
Total	1,892,134	100	12	1,892,134	100	16	28	+1
Registered voters/turnout	2,503,070	75.6	–	2,503,070	75.6	–	–	–
Source: Federal Returning Officer

Constituency members
#	Constituency	Previous member	Elected member	Party	Votes	%	Margin	Runner-up
75	Berlin-Mitte	Eva Högl	Eva Högl	SPD	35,036	23.5	4,544	Stephan Rauhut
76	Berlin-Pankow	Stefan Liebich	Stefan Liebich	LINKE	53,618	28.8	17,189	Gottfried Ludewig
77	Berlin-Reinickendorf	Frank Steffel	Frank Steffel	CDU	49,654	36.8	17,772	Thorsten Karge
78	Berlin-Spandau – Charlottenburg North	Kai Wegner	Swen Schulz	SPD	41,965	32.1	1,593	Kai Wegner
79	Berlin-Steglitz-Zehlendorf	Karl-Georg Wellmann	Thomas Heilmann	CDU	63,085	35.4	19,284	Ute Finckh-Krämer
80	Berlin-Charlottenburg-Wilmersdorf	Klaus-Dieter Gröhler	Klaus-Dieter Gröhler	CDU	47,077	30.2	3,954	Tim Renner
81	Berlin-Tempelhof-Schöneberg	Jan-Marco Luczak	Jan-Marco Luczak	CDU	51,708	28.9	12,328	Mechthild Rawert
82	Berlin-Neukölln	Fritz Felgentreu	Fritz Felgentreu	SPD	37,777	26.8	3,184	Christina Schwarzer
83	Berlin-Friedrichshain-Kreuzberg – Prenzlauer Berg East	Hans-Christian Ströbele	Canan Bayram	GRÜNE	45,055	26.3	2,455	Pascal Meiser
84	Berlin-Treptow-Köpenick	Gregor Gysi	Gregor Gysi	LINKE	61,881	39.9	32,497	Niels Korte
85	Berlin-Marzahn-Hellersdorf	Petra Pau	Petra Pau	LINKE	46,782	34.2	16,302	Monika Grütters
86	Berlin-Lichtenberg	Gesine Lötzsch	Gesine Lötzsch	LINKE	51,249	34.4	22,344	Martin Pätzold

List members
AfD	GRÜNE	FDP
1. Beatrix von Storch (1); 2. Gottfried Curio (2); 3. Götz Frömming (3); 4. Birgit Malsack-Winkemann (4)	1. Lisa Paus (1); 2. Stefan Gelbhaar (2); 3. Renate Künast (3)	1. Christoph Meyer (1); 2. Daniela Kluckert (2); 3. Hartmut Ebbing (3)
CDU	LINKE	SPD
1. Monika Grütters (1); 2. Kai Wegner (2)	1. Pascal Meiser (4); 2. Evrim Sommer (5)	1. Cansel Kiziltepe (3); 2. Klaus Mindrup (4)

=== North Rhine-Westphalia ===
Party	Constituency			Party list			Total seats	+/–
Party	Votes	%	Seats	Votes	%	Seats	Total seats	+/–
Christian Democratic Union (CDU)	3,756,952	38.3	38	3,214,013	32.6	4	42	−21
Social Democratic Party (SPD)	3,073,698	31.3	26	2,557,876	26.0	15	41	−11
Free Democratic Party (FDP)	787,235	8.0	0	1,293,052	13.1	20	20	+20
Alternative for Germany (AfD)	799,777	8.1	0	928,425	9.4	15	15	+15
Alliance 90/The Greens (GRÜNE)	641,360	6.5	0	744,970	7.6	12	12	−1
The Left (DIE LINKE)	626,631	6.4	0	736,904	7.5	12	12	+2
Die PARTEI	38,617	0.4	0	81,576	0.8	0	0	0
Human Environment Animal Protection Party	–	–	–	73,941	0.8	0	0	0
Pirate Party Germany	28,162	0.3	0	43,580	0.4	0	0	0
AD-DEMOCRATS	–	–	–	41,251	0.4	0	0	New
Free Voters	26,201	0.3	0	27,788	0.3	0	0	0
National Democratic Party	–	–	–	21,287	0.2	0	0	0
Democracy in Motion	–	–	–	12,202	0.1	0	0	New
Ecological Democratic Party	5,331	0.1	0	12,044	0.1	0	0	0
V-Partei³	–	–	–	10,513	0.1	0	0	New
Basic Income Alliance	–	–	–	9,971	0.1	0	0	New
German Centre	–	–	–	9,859	0.1	0	0	New
Democracy by Referendum	6,316	0.1	0	9,631	0.1	0	0	0
Party for Health Research	–	–	–	9,043	0.1	0	0	New
Marxist–Leninist Party	10,466	0.1	0	6,425	0.1	0	0	0
The Humanists	–	–	–	5,991	0.1	0	0	New
German Communist Party	1,284	0.0	0	2,217	0.0	0	0	New
Socialist Equality Party	–	–	–	818	0.0	0	0	0
The Violets	984	0.0	0	–	–	–	0	0
Others & Independents	11,156	0.1	0	–	–	–	0	–
Invalid/blank votes	124,291	–	–	85,084	–	–	–	–
Total	9,938,461	100	64	9,938,461	100	78	142	+4
Registered voters/turnout	13,174,577	75.4	–	13,174,577	75.4	–	–	–
Source: Federal Returning Officer

Constituency members
#	Constituency	Previous member	Elected member	Party	Votes	%	Margin	Runner-up
87	Aachen I	Rudolf Henke	Rudolf Henke	CDU	47,011	33.7	1,702	Ulla Schmidt
88	Aachen II	Helmut Brandt	Claudia Moll	SPD	63,135	36.9	730	Helmut Brandt
89	Heinsberg	Wilfried Oellers	Wilfried Oellers	CDU	64,121	45.6	24,820	Norbert Spinrath
90	Düren	Thomas Rachel	Thomas Rachel	CDU	62,711	41.9	15,168	Dietmar Nietan
91	Rhein-Erft-Kreis I	Georg Kippels	Georg Kippels	CDU	74,207	39.2	15,415	Dierk Timm
92	Euskirchen – Rhein-Erft-Kreis II	Detlef Seif	Detlef Seif	CDU	79,493	42.8	30,901	Ute Meiers
93	Cologne I	Martin Dörmann	Karsten Möring	CDU	43,683	31.6	884	Martin Dörmann
94	Cologne II	Heribert Hirte	Heribert Hirte	CDU	68,657	34.9	15,777	Elfi Scho-Antwerpes
95	Cologne III	Rolf Mützenich	Rolf Mützenich	SPD	48,148	32.3	7,042	Gisela Manderla
96	Bonn	Ulrich Kelber	Ulrich Kelber	SPD	62,377	34.9	5,047	Claudia Lücking-Michel
97	Rhein-Sieg-Kreis I	Elisabeth Winkelmeier-Becker	Elisabeth Winkelmeier-Becker	CDU	79,987	44.3	29,999	Sebastian Hartmann
98	Rhein-Sieg-Kreis II	Norbert Röttgen	Norbert Röttgen	CDU	80,441	46.5	41,195	Bettina Bähr-Losse
99	Oberbergischer Kreis	Klaus-Peter Flosbach	Carsten Brodesser	CDU	67,603	43.7	26,298	Michaela Engelmeier
100	Rheinisch-Bergischer Kreis	Wolfgang Bosbach	Hermann-Josef Tebroke	CDU	68,948	40.0	26,850	Nikolaus Kleine
101	Leverkusen – Cologne IV	Karl Lauterbach	Karl Lauterbach	SPD	59,373	38.7	12,101	Helmut Nowak
102	Wuppertal I	Manfred Zöllmer	Helge Lindh	SPD	46,657	31.5	2,843	Rainer Spiecker
103	Solingen – Remscheid – Wuppertal II	Jürgen Hardt	Jürgen Hardt	CDU	61,871	38.2	12,008	Ingo Schäfer
104	Mettmann I	Michaela Noll	Michaela Noll	CDU	70,762	44.6	29,943	Jens Niklaus
105	Mettmann II	Peter Beyer	Peter Beyer	CDU	48,689	39.3	11,221	Kerstin Griese
106	Düsseldorf I	Thomas Jarzombek	Thomas Jarzombek	CDU	69,273	40.4	27,370	Philipp Tacer
107	Düsseldorf II	Sylvia Pantel	Sylvia Pantel	CDU	47,950	33.8	9,223	Andreas Rimkus
108	Neuss I	Hermann Gröhe	Hermann Gröhe	CDU	69,658	44.0	24,344	Daniel Rinkert
109	Mönchengladbach	Günter Krings	Günter Krings	CDU	57,766	44.3	26,000	Gülistan Yüksel
110	Krefeld I – Neuss II	Ansgar Heveling	Ansgar Heveling	CDU	65,228	42.4	26,086	Nicole Specker
111	Viersen	Uwe Schummer	Uwe Schummer	CDU	82,165	47.9	39,233	Udo Schiefner
112	Kleve	Ronald Pofalla	Stefan Rouenhoff	CDU	75,375	45.0	24,178	Barbara Hendricks
113	Wesel I	Sabine Weiss	Sabine Weiss	CDU	61,849	39.0	9,764	Jürgen Preuß
114	Krefeld II – Wesel II	Siegmund Ehrmann	Kerstin Radomski	CDU	48,817	37.0	6,598	Elke Buttkereit
115	Duisburg I	Bärbel Bas	Bärbel Bas	SPD	45,455	38.3	11,402	Thomas Mahlberg
116	Duisburg II	Mahmut Özdemir	Mahmut Özdemir	SPD	34,799	34.7	8,277	Volker Mosblech
117	Oberhausen – Wesel III	Dirk Vöpel	Dirk Vöpel	SPD	56,987	38.5	13,910	Marie-Luise Dött
118	Mülheim – Essen I	Arno Klare	Arno Klare	SPD	49,226	34.9	5,007	Astrid Timmermann-Fechter
119	Essen II	Dirk Heidenblut	Dirk Heidenblut	SPD	40,601	37.3	11,689	Jutta Eckenbach
120	Essen III	Matthias Hauer	Matthias Hauer	CDU	56,393	37.1	9,564	Gereon Wolters
121	Recklinghausen I	Frank Schwabe	Frank Schwabe	SPD	47,257	38.7	9,465	Michael Breilmann
122	Recklinghausen II	Michael Groß	Michael Groß	SPD	56,019	41.1	9,037	Rita Stockhofe
123	Gelsenkirchen	Joachim Poß	Markus Töns	SPD	45,017	38.3	15,249	Oliver Wittke
124	Steinfurt I – Borken I	Jens Spahn	Jens Spahn	CDU	78,579	51.3	38,995	Ingrid Arndt-Brauer
125	Bottrop – Recklinghausen III	Michael Gerdes	Michael Gerdes	SPD	55,128	36.8	4,794	Sven Volmering
126	Borken II	Johannes Röring	Johannes Röring	CDU	81,496	52.3	42,084	Ursula Schulte
127	Coesfeld – Steinfurt II	Karl Schiewerling	Marc Henrichmann	CDU	79,677	51.6	43,427	Ulrich Hampel
128	Steinfurt III	Anja Karliczek	Anja Karliczek	CDU	67,678	44.8	21,881	Jürgen Coße
129	Münster	Sybille Benning	Sybille Benning	CDU	70,606	37.2	15,828	Robert von Olberg
130	Warendorf	Reinhold Sendker	Reinhold Sendker	CDU	75,017	46.4	29,923	Bernhard Daldrup
131	Gütersloh I	Ralph Brinkhaus	Ralph Brinkhaus	CDU	81,298	46.6	32,356	Elvan Korkmaz
132	Bielefeld – Gütersloh II	Christina Kampmann	Wiebke Esdar	SPD	61,086	33.2	4,601	Michael Weber
133	Herford – Minden-Lübbecke II	Stefan Schwartze	Stefan Schwartze	SPD	61,205	36.7	1,634	Tim Ostermann
134	Minden-Lübbecke I	Steffen Kampeter	Achim Post	SPD	55,868	37.4	2,811	Oliver Vogt
135	Lippe I	Dirk Becker	Kerstin Vieregge	CDU	46,526	36.6	5,618	Henning Welslau
136	Höxter – Lippe II	Christian Haase	Christian Haase	CDU	69,910	44.3	27,699	Petra Rode-Bosse
137	Paderborn – Gütersloh III	Carsten Linnemann	Carsten Linnemann	CDU	99,004	53.3	62,021	Burkhard Blienert
138	Hagen – Ennepe-Ruhr-Kreis I	René Röspel	René Röspel	SPD	58,206	39.2	13,258	Cemile Giousouf
139	Ennepe-Ruhr-Kreis II	Ralf Kapschack	Ralf Kapschack	SPD	49,333	36.7	5,060	Ralf Brauksiepe
140	Bochum I	Axel Schäfer	Axel Schäfer	SPD	57,655	37.2	13,882	Christian Haardt
141	Herne – Bochum II	Michelle Müntefering	Michelle Müntefering	SPD	52,672	41.9	22,311	Paul Ziemiak
142	Dortmund I	Marco Bülow	Marco Bülow	SPD	59,990	38.8	15,762	Thorsten Hoffmann
143	Dortmund II	Sabine Poschmann	Sabine Poschmann	SPD	55,038	38.8	15,105	Steffen Kanitz
144	Unna I	Oliver Kaczmarek	Oliver Kaczmarek	SPD	58,019	38.8	10,567	Hubert Hüppe
145	Hamm – Unna II	Michael Thews	Michael Thews	SPD	61,717	36.4	2,017	Sylvia Jörrißen
146	Soest	Bernhard Schulte-Drüggelte	Hans-Jürgen Thies	CDU	73,595	42.7	23,137	Wolfgang Hellmich
147	Hochsauerlandkreis	Patrick Sensburg	Patrick Sensburg	CDU	73,185	48.0	32,138	Dirk Wiese
148	Siegen-Wittgenstein	Volkmar Klein	Volkmar Klein	CDU	64,484	40.1	15,924	Heiko Becker
149	Olpe – Märkischer Kreis I	Matthias Heider	Matthias Heider	CDU	72,158	47.9	32,459	Nezahat Baradari
150	Märkischer Kreis II	Dagmar Freitag	Dagmar Freitag	SPD	54,890	38.6	1,176	Christel Voßbeck-Kayser

List members
FDP	SPD	AfD
1. Christian Lindner (1); 2. Marie-Agnes Strack-Zimmermann (2); 3. Alexander Graf Lambsdorff (3); 4. Marco Buschmann (4); 5. Johannes Vogel (5); 6. Bijan Djir-Sarai (6); 7. Otto Fricke (7); 8. Reinhard Houben (8); 9. Frank Schäffler (9); 10. Karlheinz Busen (10); 11. Markus Herbrand (11); 12. Nicole Westig (12); 13. Bernd Reuther (13); 14. Carl-Julius Cronenberg (14); 15. Christian Sauter (15); 16. Manfred Todtenhausen (16); 17. Katrin Helling-Plahr (17); 18. Roman Müller-Böhm (18); 19. Olaf in der Beek (19); 20. Katharina Kloke (20)	1. Martin Schulz (1); 2. Barbara Hendricks (2); 3. Wolfgang Hellmich (3); 4. Kerstin Griese (4); 5. Bernhard Daldrup (7); 6. Ursula Schulte (8); 7. Dietmar Nietan (9); 8. Ulla Schmidt (10); 9. Udo Schiefner (11); 10. Gülistan Yüksel (12); 11. Dirk Wiese (13); 12. Ingrid Arndt-Brauer (14); 13. Sebastian Hartmann (15); 14. Elvan Korkmaz (16); 15. Andreas Rimkus (17)	1. Martin Renner (1); 2. Jochen Haug (2); 3. Harald Weyel (3); 4. Kay Gottschalk (4); 5. Jörg Schneider (5); 6. Fabian Jacobi (6); 7. Rüdiger Lucassen (7); 8. Udo Hemmelgarn (8); 9. Uwe Kamann (9); 10. Michael Espendiller (10); 11. Stefan Keuter (11); 12. Mario Mieruch (12); 13. Uwe Witt (13); 14. Roland Hartwig (14); 15. Berengar Elsner von Gronow (15)
GRÜNE	LINKE	CDU
1. Britta Haßelmann (1); 2. Oliver Krischer (2); 3. Katja Dörner (3); 4. Sven Lehmann (4); 5. Irene Mihalic (5); 6. Frithjof Schmidt (6); 7. Katharina Dröge (7); 8. Markus Kurth (8); 9. Maria Klein-Schmeink (9); 10. Kai Gehring (10); 11. Ulle Schauws (11); 12. Friedrich Ostendorff (12)	1. Sahra Wagenknecht (1); 2. Matthias Birkwald (2); 3. Sevim Dağdelen (3); 4. Andrej Hunko (4); 5. Ulla Jelpke (5); 6. Niema Movassat (6); 7. Kathrin Vogler (7); 8. Hubertus Zdebel (8); 9. Sylvia Gabelmann (9); 10. Alexander Neu (10); 11. Ingrid Remmers (11); 12. Friedrich Straetmanns (12)	1. Oliver Wittke (3); 2. Marie-Luise Dött (8); 3. Ralf Brauksiepe (9); 4. Paul Ziemiak (10)

=== Saxony ===
Party	Constituency			Party list			Total seats	+/–
Party	Votes	%	Seats	Votes	%	Seats	Total seats	+/–
Alternative for Germany (AfD)	628,048	25.4	3	669,940	27.0	8	11	+11
Christian Democratic Union (CDU)	756,206	30.6	12	665,751	26.9	0	12	−5
The Left (DIE LINKE)	432,722	17.5	1	398,627	16.1	5	6	−2
Social Democratic Party (SPD)	289,109	11.7	0	261,105	10.5	4	4	−2
Free Democratic Party (FDP)	165,449	6.7	0	203,662	8.2	3	3	+3
Alliance 90/The Greens (GRÜNE)	112,300	4.5	0	113,608	4.6	2	2	0
Human Environment Animal Protection Party	–	–	–	35,121	1.4	0	0	0
Die PARTEI	21,473	0.9	0	31,999	1.3	0	0	0
National Democratic Party	4,079	0.2	0	28,215	1.1	0	0	0
Free Voters	13,761	0.6	0	27,471	1.1	0	0	0
Pirate Party Germany	7,286	0.3	0	11,056	0.4	0	0	0
Basic Income Alliance	–	–	–	9,451	0.4	0	0	New
Ecological Democratic Party	3,622	0.1	0	6,809	0.3	0	0	0
Democracy in Motion	–	–	–	6,475	0.3	0	0	New
V-Partei³	–	–	–	4,058	0.2	0	0	New
Socialist Equality Party	334	0.0	0	–	–	–	0	0
Others & Independents	23,967	1.0	0	–	–	–	0	–
Invalid/blank votes	39,951	–	–	30,280	–	–	–	–
Total	2,509,684	100	16	2,509,684	100	22	38	+5
Registered voters/turnout	3,329,550	75.4	–	3,329,550	75.4	–	–	–
Source: Federal Returning Officer

Constituency members
#	Constituency	Previous member	Elected member	Party	Votes	%	Margin	Runner-up
151	Nordsachsen	Marian Wendt	Marian Wendt	CDU	38,207	32.8	6,963	Detlev Spangenberg
152	Leipzig I	Bettina Kudla	Jens Lehmann	CDU	43,919	27.5	11,217	Christoph Neumann
153	Leipzig II	Thomas Feist	Sören Pellmann	LINKE	43,948	25.3	1,170	Thomas Feist
154	Leipzig-Land	Katharina Landgraf	Katharina Landgraf	CDU	54,152	34.1	8,589	Lars Herrmann
155	Meißen	Thomas de Maizière	Thomas de Maizière	CDU	55,326	36.7	8,561	Carsten Hütter
156	Bautzen I	Maria Michalk	Karsten Hilse	AfD	52,770	33.2	4,191	Roland Ermer
157	Görlitz	Michael Kretschmer	Tino Chrupalla	AfD	49,834	32.4	1,578	Michael Kretschmer
158	Sächsische Schweiz-Osterzgebirge	Klaus Brähmig	Frauke Petry	AfD	57,554	37.4	13,200	Klaus Brähmig
159	Dresden I	Andreas Lämmel	Andreas Lämmel	CDU	44,388	24.6	4,008	Jens Maier
160	Dresden II – Bautzen II	Arnold Vaatz	Arnold Vaatz	CDU	47,185	25.5	5,983	Anka Willms
161	Mittelsachsen	Veronika Bellmann	Veronika Bellmann	CDU	48,230	32.4	1,403	Heiko Hessenkemper
162	Chemnitz	Frank Heinrich	Frank Heinrich	CDU	38,653	26.6	3,695	Nico Köhler
163	Chemnitzer Umland – Erzgebirgskreis II	Marco Wanderwitz	Marco Wanderwitz	CDU	48,012	35.1	11,624	Ulrich Oehme
164	Erzgebirgskreis I	Günter Baumann	Alexander Krauß	CDU	56,716	34.7	7,251	Karsten Teubner
165	Zwickau	Carsten Körber	Carsten Körber	CDU	48,347	33.7	11,466	Sabine Zimmermann
166	Vogtlandkreis	Robert Hochbaum	Yvonne Magwas	CDU	49,104	35.0	12,676	Ulrich Lupart

List members
AfD	LINKE	SPD
1. Jens Maier (2); 2. Siegbert Droese (3); 3. Detlev Spangenberg (4); 4. Heiko Heßenkemper (6); 5. Ulrich Oehme (7); 6. Verena Hartmann (9); 7. Lars Herrmann (10); 8. Christoph Neumann (11)	1. Katja Kipping (1); 2. André Hahn (2); 3. Caren Lay (3); 4. Michael Leutert (4); 5. Sabine Zimmermann (5)	1. Daniela Kolbe (1); 2. Thomas Jurk (2); 3. Susann Rüthrich (3); 4. Detlef Müller (4)
FDP	GRÜNE	
1. Torsten Herbst (1); 2. Jürgen Martens (2); 3. Frank Müller-Rosentritt (3)	1. Monika Lazar (1); 2. Stephan Kühn (2)	

=== Hesse ===
Party	Constituency			Party list			Total seats	+/–
Party	Votes	%	Seats	Votes	%	Seats	Total seats	+/–
Christian Democratic Union (CDU)	1,185,393	35.4	17	1,033,200	30.9	0	17	−4
Social Democratic Party (SPD)	974,954	29.2	5	788,427	23.5	7	12	−4
Alternative for Germany (AfD)	375,528	11.2	0	398,712	11.9	6	6	+6
Free Democratic Party (FDP)	238,437	7.1	0	386,742	11.5	6	6	+6
Alliance 90/The Greens (GRÜNE)	270,221	8.1	0	323,736	9.7	5	5	0
The Left (DIE LINKE)	220,145	6.6	0	271,158	8.1	4	4	+1
Human Environment Animal Protection Party	–	–	–	34,079	1.0	0	0	0
Die PARTEI	13,786	0.4	0	30,500	0.9	0	0	0
Free Voters	48,199	1.4	0	28,507	0.9	0	0	0
Pirate Party Germany	5,844	0.2	0	14,448	0.4	0	0	0
National Democratic Party	4,423	0.1	0	11,904	0.4	0	0	0
German Centre	–	–	–	6,393	0.2	0	0	New
Basic Income Alliance	–	–	–	6,320	0.2	0	0	New
Ecological Democratic Party	–	–	–	6,042	0.2	0	0	0
V-Partei³	–	–	–	5,246	0.2	0	0	New
Marxist–Leninist Party	1,869	0.1	0	1,627	0.0	0	0	0
German Communist Party	234	0.0	0	1,138	0.0	0	0	New
Civil Rights Movement Solidarity	–	–	–	721	0.0	0	0	0
The Violets	522	0.0	0	–	–	–	0	0
Socialist Equality Party	97	0.0	0	–	–	–	0	0
Others & Independents	4,900	0.1	0	–	–	–	0	–
Invalid/blank votes	50,889	–	–	46,541	–	–	–	–
Total	3,395,441	100	22	3,395,441	100	28	50	+5
Registered voters/turnout	4,408,986	77.0	–	4,408,986	77.0	–	–	–
Source: Federal Returning Officer

Constituency members
#	Constituency	Previous member	Elected member	Party	Votes	%	Margin	Runner-up
167	Waldeck	Thomas Viesehon	Esther Dilcher	SPD	49,341	35.1	2,072	Thomas Viesehon
168	Kassel	Ulrike Gottschalck	Timon Gremmels	SPD	58,759	35.6	14,334	Norbert Wett
169	Werra-Meißner – Hersfeld-Rotenburg	Michael Roth	Michael Roth	SPD	54,033	41.2	14,731	Timo Lübeck
170	Schwalm-Eder	Edgar Franke	Edgar Franke	SPD	53,892	37.7	10,378	Bernd Siebert
171	Marburg	Sören Bartol	Sören Bartol	SPD	50,214	35.7	3,326	Stefan Heck
172	Lahn-Dill	Sibylle Pfeiffer	Hans-Jürgen Irmer	CDU	58,417	38.3	13,042	Dagmar Schmidt
173	Gießen	Helge Braun	Helge Braun	CDU	57,610	35.1	11,394	Matthias Körner
174	Fulda	Michael Brand	Michael Brand	CDU	71,946	45.2	30,796	Birgit Kömpel
175	Main-Kinzig – Wetterau II – Schotten	Peter Tauber	Peter Tauber	CDU	49,479	36.4	11,018	Bettina Müller
176	Hochtaunus	Markus Koob	Markus Koob	CDU	57,579	39.9	24,378	Hans-Joachim Schabedoth
177	Wetterau I	Oswin Veith	Oswin Veith	CDU	49,891	36.4	10,118	Natalie Pawlik
178	Rheingau-Taunus – Limburg	Klaus-Peter Willsch	Klaus-Peter Willsch	CDU	71,555	41.8	28,128	Martin Rabanus
179	Wiesbaden	Kristina Schröder	Ingmar Jung	CDU	47,309	34.3	7,913	Simon Rottloff
180	Hanau	Katja Leikert	Katja Leikert	CDU	46,656	35.3	6,471	Sascha Raabe
181	Main-Taunus	Heinz Riesenhuber	Norbert Altenkamp	CDU	66,490	41.9	21,963	Ilja-Kristin Seewald
182	Frankfurt am Main I	Matthias Zimmer	Matthias Zimmer	CDU	43,663	30.5	4,959	Oliver Strank
183	Frankfurt am Main II	Erika Steinbach	Bettina Wiesmann	CDU	55,221	32.4	10,981	Ulli Nissen
184	Groß-Gerau	Franz Josef Jung	Stefan Sauer	CDU	45,963	35.1	3,621	Jan Deboy
185	Offenbach	Peter Wichtel	Björn Simon	CDU	58,565	36.4	18,459	Tuna Firat
186	Darmstadt	Brigitte Zypries	Astrid Mannes	CDU	58,216	30.7	1,684	Christel Sprößler
187	Odenwald	Patricia Lips	Patricia Lips	CDU	65,654	36.1	12,893	Jens Zimmermann
188	Bergstraße	Michael Meister	Michael Meister	CDU	59,781	38.9	18,373	Christine Lambrecht

List members
SPD	AfD	FDP
1. Christine Lambrecht (2); 2. Sascha Raabe (3); 3. Dagmar Schmidt (4); 4. Ulli Nissen (6); 5. Martin Rabanus (7); 6. Bettina Müller (8); 7. Jens Zimmermann (9)	1. Mariana Harder-Kühnel (1); 2. Joana Cotar (2); 3. Uwe Schulz (3); 4. Jan Nolte (4); 5. Albrecht Glaser (5); 6. Martin Hohmann (6)	1. Nicola Beer (1); 2. Stefan Ruppert (2); 3. Hermann Otto Solms (3); 4. Bettina Stark-Watzinger (4); 5. Till Mansmann (5); 6. Alexander Müller (6)
GRÜNE	LINKE	
1. Daniela Wagner (1); 2. Omid Nouripour (2); 3. Kordula Schulz-Asche (3); 4. Wolfgang Strengmann-Kuhn (4); 5. Bettina Hoffmann (5)	1. Sabine Leidig (1); 2. Achim Kessler (2); 3. Christine Buchholz (3); 4. Jörg Cezanne (4)	

=== Thuringia ===
Party	Constituency			Party list			Total seats	+/–
Party	Votes	%	Seats	Votes	%	Seats	Total seats	+/–
Christian Democratic Union (CDU)	408,513	31.6	8	372,258	28.8	0	8	−1
Alternative for Germany (AfD)	291,466	22.5	0	294,069	22.7	5	5	+5
The Left (DIE LINKE)	227,194	17.6	0	218,212	16.9	3	3	−2
Social Democratic Party (SPD)	188,802	14.6	0	171,032	13.2	3	3	0
Free Democratic Party (FDP)	71,579	5.5	0	101,129	7.8	2	2	+2
Alliance 90/The Greens (GRÜNE)	46,919	3.6	0	53,340	4.1	1	1	0
Free Voters	33,707	2.6	0	21,131	1.6	0	0	0
Die PARTEI	3,691	0.3	0	19,132	1.5	0	0	0
National Democratic Party	3,193	0.2	0	16,083	1.2	0	0	0
Ecological Democratic Party	5,292	0.4	0	6,398	0.5	0	0	0
Pirate Party Germany	2,844	0.2	0	6,057	0.5	0	0	0
Basic Income Alliance	–	–	–	5,307	0.4	0	0	New
German Centre	–	–	–	4,948	0.4	0	0	New
V-Partei³	1,201	0.1	0	3,450	0.3	0	0	New
Marxist–Leninist Party	1,293	0.1	0	1,902	0.1	0	0	0
Others & Independents	6,973	0.5	0	–	–	–	0	–
Invalid/blank votes	19,385	–	–	17,604	–	–	–	–
Total	1,312,052	100	8	1,312,052	100	14	22	+4
Registered voters/turnout	1,767,014	74.3	–	1,767,014	74.3	–	–	–
Source: Federal Returning Officer

Constituency members
#	Constituency	Previous member	Elected member	Party	Votes	%	Margin	Runner-up
189	Eichsfeld – Nordhausen – Kyffhäuserkreis	Manfred Grund	Manfred Grund	CDU	59,318	38.0	25,916	Jürgen Pohl
190	Eisenach – Wartburgkreis – Unstrut-Hainich-Kreis	Christian Hirte	Christian Hirte	CDU	55,378	34.4	21,326	Klaus Stöber
191	Jena – Sömmerda – Weimarer Land I	Johannes Selle	Johannes Selle	CDU	44,684	29.2	12,004	Ralph Lenkert
192	Gotha – Ilm-Kreis	Tankred Schipanski	Tankred Schipanski	CDU	42,221	29.0	7,423	Carsten Günther
193	Erfurt – Weimar – Weimarer Land II	Antje Tillmann	Antje Tillmann	CDU	45,305	27.3	14,357	Martina Renner
194	Gera – Greiz – Altenburger Land	Volkmar Vogel	Volkmar Vogel	CDU	52,980	30.4	5,422	Robby Schlund
195	Saalfeld-Rudolstadt – Saale-Holzland-Kreis – Saale-Orla-Kreis	Carola Stauche	Albert Weiler	CDU	52,311	30.9	7,417	Michael Kaufmann
196	Suhl – Schmalkalden-Meiningen – Hildburghausen – Sonneberg	Mark Hauptmann	Mark Hauptmann	CDU	56,316	33.5	17,965	Torsten Ludwig

List members
AfD	LINKE	SPD
1. Stephan Brandner (1); 2. Jürgen Pohl (2); 3. Marcus Bühl (3); 4. Robby Schlund (4); 5. Anton Friesen (5)	1. Martina Renner (1); 2. Ralph Lenkert (2); 3. Kersten Steinke (3)	1. Carsten Schneider (1); 2. Elisabeth Kaiser (2); 3. Christoph Matschie (3)
FDP	GRÜNE	
1. Thomas Kemmerich (1); 2. Gerald Ullrich (2)	1. Katrin Göring-Eckardt (1)	

=== Rhineland-Palatinate ===
Party	Constituency			Party list			Total seats	+/–
Party	Votes	%	Seats	Votes	%	Seats	Total seats	+/–
Christian Democratic Union (CDU)	932,382	39.6	14	848,003	35.9	0	14	−2
Social Democratic Party (SPD)	676,438	28.8	1	570,518	24.1	8	9	−1
Alternative for Germany (AfD)	223,659	9.5	0	265,688	11.2	4	4	+4
Free Democratic Party (FDP)	161,479	6.9	0	245,235	10.4	4	4	+4
Alliance 90/The Greens (GRÜNE)	140,906	6.0	0	179,233	7.6	3	3	0
The Left (DIE LINKE)	133,323	5.7	0	160,912	6.8	3	3	+1
Free Voters	54,294	2.3	0	32,263	1.4	0	0	0
Die PARTEI	10,970	0.5	0	23,957	1.0	0	0	0
Pirate Party Germany	3,830	0.2	0	10,792	0.5	0	0	0
Ecological Democratic Party	7,107	0.3	0	7,330	0.3	0	0	0
National Democratic Party	1,495	0.1	0	7,025	0.3	0	0	0
V-Partei³	–	–	–	6,203	0.3	0	0	New
Basic Income Alliance	–	–	–	4,505	0.2	0	0	New
Marxist–Leninist Party	581	0.0	0	842	0.0	0	0	0
New Liberals	542	0.0	0	–	–	–	0	New
The Union	371	0.0	0	–	–	–	0	New
Others & Independents	4,493	0.2	0	–	–	–	0	–
Invalid/blank votes	40,223	–	–	29,587	–	–	–	–
Total	2,392,093	100	15	2,392,093	100	22	37	+6
Registered voters/turnout	3,080,591	77.7	–	3,080,591	77.7	–	–	–
Source: Federal Returning Officer

Constituency members
#	Constituency	Previous member	Elected member	Party	Votes	%	Margin	Runner-up
197	Neuwied	Erwin Rüddel	Erwin Rüddel	CDU	76,933	43.2	25,937	Martin Diedenhofen
198	Ahrweiler	Mechthild Heil	Mechthild Heil	CDU	64,006	42.8	23,062	Andrea Nahles
199	Koblenz	Michael Fuchs	Josef Oster	CDU	61,594	41.3	18,817	Detlev Pilger
200	Mosel/Rhein-Hunsrück	Peter Bleser	Peter Bleser	CDU	58,596	44.1	25,119	Ivonne Horbert
201	Kreuznach	Antje Lezius	Antje Lezius	CDU	50,975	37.0	7,602	Joe Weingarten
202	Bitburg	Patrick Schnieder	Patrick Schnieder	CDU	63,719	51.2	31,702	Jan Pauls
203	Trier	Bernhard Kaster	Andreas Steier	CDU	56,611	37.9	6,328	Katarina Barley
204	Montabaur	Andreas Nick	Andreas Nick	CDU	68,727	43.3	21,415	Gabi Weber
205	Mainz	Ursula Groden-Kranich	Ursula Groden-Kranich	CDU	71,535	35.7	15,351	Carsten Kühl
206	Worms	Jan Metzler	Jan Metzler	CDU	68,685	41.1	24,116	Marcus Held
207	Ludwigshafen/Frankenthal	Maria Böhmer	Torbjörn Kartes	CDU	51,168	32.1	428	Doris Barnett
208	Neustadt – Speyer	Norbert Schindler	Johannes Steiniger	CDU	69,504	40.0	25,472	Isabel Mackensen
209	Kaiserslautern	Gustav Herzog	Gustav Herzog	SPD	57,482	33.9	4,460	Xaver Jung
210	Pirmasens	Anita Schäfer	Anita Schäfer	CDU	48,719	36.8	10,691	Angelika Glöckner
211	Südpfalz	Thomas Gebhart	Thomas Gebhart	CDU	68,588	40.3	24,364	Thomas Hitschler

List members
SPD	AfD	FDP
1. Andrea Nahles (1); 2. Katarina Barley (3); 3. Marcus Held (4); 4. Doris Barnett (5); 5. Thomas Hitschler (6); 6. Gabi Weber (7); 7. Detlev Pilger (8); 8. Angelika Glöckner (9)	1. Sebastian Münzenmaier (1); 2. Heiko Wildberg (2); 3. Andreas Bleck (3); 4. Nicole Höchst (4)	1. Manuel Höferlin (1); 2. Sandra Weeser (2); 3. Mario Brandenburg (3); 4. Carina Konrad (4)
GRÜNE	LINKE	
1. Tabea Rößner (1); 2. Tobias Lindner (2); 3. Corinna Rüffer (3)	1. Alexander Ulrich (1); 2. Katrin Werner (2); 3. Brigitte Freihold (3)	

=== Bavaria ===
Party	Constituency			Party list			Total seats	+/–
Party	Votes	%	Seats	Votes	%	Seats	Total seats	+/–
Christian Social Union in Bavaria (CSU)	3,255,487	44.2	46	2,869,688	38.8	0	46	−10
Social Democratic Party (SPD)	1,336,404	18.1	0	1,130,931	15.3	18	18	−4
Alternative for Germany (AfD)	773,542	10.5	0	916,300	12.4	14	14	+14
Free Democratic Party (FDP)	477,884	6.5	0	751,248	10.2	12	12	+12
Alliance 90/The Greens (GRÜNE)	661,356	9.0	0	722,116	9.8	11	11	+2
The Left (DIE LINKE)	384,368	5.2	0	450,803	6.1	7	7	+3
Free Voters	250,119	3.4	0	199,198	2.7	0	0	0
Ecological Democratic Party	119,103	1.6	0	66,801	0.9	0	0	0
Human Environment Animal Protection Party	–	–	–	66,218	0.9	0	0	0
Bavaria Party	62.622	0.8	0	58.037	0.8	0	0	0
Die PARTEI	13,205	0.2	0	51,607	0.7	0	0	0
Pirate Party Germany	10,421	0.1	0	26,866	0.4	0	0	0
National Democratic Party	583	0.0	0	20.611	0.3	0	0	0
V-Partei³	–	–	–	13,391	0.2	0	0	New
German Centre	–	–	–	12,689	0.2	0	0	New
Democracy in Motion	–	–	–	12,073	0.2	0	0	New
Basic Income Alliance	–	–	–	10,394	0.1	0	0	New
Party for Health Research	–	–	–	9,529	0.1	0	0	New
Marxist–Leninist Party	2,309	0.0	0	2,213	0.0	0	0	0
Civil Rights Movement Solidarity	2,130	0.0	0	1,284	0.0	0	0	0
German Communist Party	–	–	–	1,213	0.0	0	0	New
The Violets	670	0.0	0	–	–	–	0	0
Alliance C – Christians for Germany	358	0.0	0	–	–	–	0	New
Others & Independents	21,128	0.3	0	–	–	–	0	–
Invalid/blank votes	69,317	–	–	47,796	–	–	–	–
Total	7,441,006	100	46	7,441,006	100	62	108	+17
Registered voters/turnout	9,522,371	78.1	–	9,522,371	78.1	–	–	–
Source: Federal Returning Officer

Constituency members
#	Constituency	Previous member	Elected member	Party	Votes	%	Margin	Runner-up
212	Altötting	Stephan Mayer	Stephan Mayer	CSU	68,435	54.5	51,949	Oliver Multusch
213	Erding – Ebersberg	Andreas Lenz	Andreas Lenz	CSU	78,212	48.2	54,081	Ewald Schurer
214	Freising	Erich Irlstorfer	Erich Irlstorfer	CSU	79,545	43.0	54,629	Andreas Mehltretter
215	Fürstenfeldbruck	Gerda Hasselfeldt	Katrin Staffler	CSU	82,602	43.6	47,148	Michael Schrodi
216	Ingolstadt	Reinhard Brandl	Reinhard Brandl	CSU	90,383	49.5	65,584	Werner Widuckel
217	Munich North	Johannes Singhammer	Bernhard Loos	CSU	55,811	32.2	10,743	Florian Post
218	Munich East	Wolfgang Stefinger	Wolfgang Stefinger	CSU	68,255	36.8	28,634	Claudia Tausend
219	Munich South	Peter Gauweiler	Michael Kuffer	CSU	55,894	33.0	16,021	Sebastian Roloff
220	Munich West/Centre	Hans-Peter Uhl	Stephan Pilsinger	CSU	64,014	33.3	19,731	Bernhard Goodwin
221	Munich Land	Florian Hahn	Florian Hahn	CSU	85,347	43.5	53,404	Bela Bach
222	Rosenheim	Daniela Ludwig	Daniela Ludwig	CSU	84,981	45.9	60,993	Andreas Winhart
223	Bad Tölz-Wolfratshausen – Miesbach	New seat	Alexander Radwan	CSU	62,465	47.6	44,679	Karl Bär
224	Starnberg – Landsberg am Lech	Alexander Radwan	Michael Kießling	CSU	73,948	42.1	44,640	Christian Winklmeier
225	Traunstein	Peter Ramsauer	Peter Ramsauer	CSU	80,056	50.3	54,397	Bärbel Kofler
226	Weilheim	Alexander Dobrindt	Alexander Dobrindt	CSU	63,784	47.9	44,602	Enrico Corongiu
227	Deggendorf	Bartholomäus Kalb	Thomas Erndl	CSU	52,167	44.1	31,555	Rita Hagl-Kehl
228	Landshut	Florian Oßner	Florian Oßner	CSU	75,702	39.6	49,732	Anja König
229	Passau	Andreas Scheuer	Andreas Scheuer	CSU	61,835	47.5	37,224	Christian Flisek
230	Rottal-Inn	Max Straubinger	Max Straubinger	CSU	55,364	45.0	36,825	Stephan Protschka
231	Straubing	Alois Rainer	Alois Rainer	CSU	60,976	47.6	39,451	Johanna Ueckermann
232	Amberg	Alois Karl	Alois Karl	CSU	80,075	47.7	54,495	Johannes Foitzik
233	Regensburg	Philipp Lerchenfeld	Peter Aumer	CSU	78,858	40.1	45,996	Tobias Hammerl
234	Schwandorf	Karl Holmeier	Karl Holmeier	CSU	77,092	48.5	38,631	Marianne Schieder
235	Weiden	Albert Rupprecht	Albert Rupprecht	CSU	59,285	46.2	30,671	Uli Grötsch
236	Bamberg	Thomas Silberhorn	Thomas Silberhorn	CSU	60,675	42.1	31,200	Andreas Schwarz
237	Bayreuth	Hartmut Koschyk	Silke Launert	CSU	58,665	46.5	31,880	Anette Kramme
238	Coburg	Hans Michelbach	Hans Michelbach	CSU	55,078	45.3	22,915	Doris Aschenbrenner
239	Hof	Hans-Peter Friedrich	Hans-Peter Friedrich	CSU	59,182	47.0	29,541	Jörg Nürnberger
240	Kulmbach	Emmi Zeulner	Emmi Zeulner	CSU	74,105	55.4	52,611	Thomas Bauske
241	Ansbach	Josef Göppel	Artur Auernhammer	CSU	81,431	44.3	47,676	Lutz Egerer
242	Erlangen	Stefan Müller	Stefan Müller	CSU	62,767	42.7	31,802	Martina Stamm-Fibich
243	Fürth	Christian Schmidt	Christian Schmidt	CSU	78,559	39.9	33,504	Carsten Träger
244	Nuremberg North	Dagmar Wöhrl	Sebastian Brehm	CSU	45,340	31.3	8,272	Gabriela Heinrich
245	Nuremberg South	Michael Frieser	Michael Frieser	CSU	46,511	35.6	11,890	Martin Burkert
246	Roth	Marlene Mortler	Marlene Mortler	CSU	81,874	44.5	43,954	Alexander Horlamus
247	Aschaffenburg	Andrea Lindholz	Andrea Lindholz	CSU	68,708	48.1	45,048	Alexander Spatz
248	Bad Kissingen	Dorothee Bär	Dorothee Bär	CSU	86,603	51.1	54,220	Sabine Dittmar
249	Main-Spessart	Alexander Hoffmann	Alexander Hoffmann	CSU	72,406	46.6	37,258	Bernd Rützel
250	Schweinfurt	Anja Weisgerber	Anja Weisgerber	CSU	73,901	47.9	47,555	Markus Hümpfer
251	Würzburg	Paul Lehrieder	Paul Lehrieder	CSU	76,515	42.2	42,586	Eva Maria Linsenbreder
252	Augsburg-Stadt	Volker Ullrich	Volker Ullrich	CSU	52,769	34.8	23,484	Ulrike Bahr
253	Augsburg-Land	Hansjörg Durz	Hansjörg Durz	CSU	94,252	47.8	66,439	Herbert Woerlein
254	Donau-Ries	Ulrich Lange	Ulrich Lange	CSU	68,770	47.0	42,208	Christoph Schmid
255	Neu-Ulm	Georg Nüßlein	Georg Nüßlein	CSU	80,503	44.6	54,084	Karl-Heinz Brunner
256	Oberallgäu	Gerd Müller	Gerd Müller	CSU	88,357	50.4	66,906	Katharina Schrader
257	Ostallgäu	Stephan Stracke	Stephan Stracke	CSU	93,430	49.2	69,412	Christoph Maier

List members
SPD	AfD	FDP
1. Florian Pronold (1); 2. Anette Kramme (2); 3. Martin Burkert (3); 4. Ulrike Bahr (4); 5. Ewald Schurer (5); 6. Marianne Schieder (6); 7. Bernd Rützel (7); 8. Bärbel Kofler (8); 9. Florian Post (9); 10. Sabine Dittmar (10); 11. Uli Grötsch (11); 12. Claudia Tausend (12); 13. Andreas Schwarz (13); 14. Martina Stamm-Fibich (14); 15. Karl-Heinz Brunner (15); 16. Rita Hagl-Kehl (16); 17. Michael Schrodi (17); 18. Gabriela Heinrich (18)	1. Martin Hebner (1); 2. Peter Boehringer (2); 3. Corinna Miazga (3); 4. Petr Bystron (4); 5. Martin Sichert (5); 6. Hansjörg Müller (6); 7. Peter Felser (7); 8. Gerold Otten (8); 9. Stephan Protschka (9); 10. Paul Podolay (10); 11. Tobias Peterka (11); 12. Rainer Kraft (12); 13. Johannes Huber (13); 14. Wolfgang Wiehle (14)	1. Daniel Föst (1); 2. Karsten Klein (2); 3. Katja Hessel (3); 4. Jimmy Schulz (4); 5. Thomas Sattelberger (5); 6. Lukas Köhler (6); 7. Stephan Thomae (7); 8. Ulrich Lechte (8); 9. Britta Dassler (9); 10. Thomas Hacker (10); 11. Nicole Bauer (11); 12. Andrew Ullmann (12)
GRÜNE	LINKE	
1. Claudia Roth (1); 2. Anton Hofreiter (2); 3. Ekin Deligöz (3); 4. Uwe Kekeritz (4); 5. Beate Walter-Rosenheimer (5); 6. Dieter Janecek (6); 7. Manuela Rottmann (7); 8. Erhard Grundl (8); 9. Margarete Bause (9); 10. Stefan Schmidt (10); 11. Lisa Badum (11)	1. Klaus Ernst (1); 2. Nicole Gohlke (2); 3. Susanne Ferschl (3); 4. Harald Weinberg (4); 5. Simone Barrientos (5); 6. Andreas Wagner (6); 7. Eva Schreiber (7)	

=== Baden-Württemberg ===
Party	Constituency			Party list			Total seats	+/–
Party	Votes	%	Seats	Votes	%	Seats	Total seats	+/–
Christian Democratic Union (CDU)	2,350,054	39.3	38	2,061,687	34.4	0	38	−5
Social Democratic Party (SPD)	1,166,668	19.5	0	982,370	16.4	16	16	−4
Alliance 90/The Greens (GRÜNE)	801,880	13.4	0	807,205	13.5	13	13	+3
Free Democratic Party (FDP)	517,512	8.6	0	762,008	12.7	12	12	+12
Alternative for Germany (AfD)	690,128	11.5	0	730,499	12.2	11	11	+11
The Left (DIE LINKE)	325,019	5.4	0	380,727	6.4	6	6	+1
Human Environment Animal Protection Party	20,756	0.3	0	51,355	0.9	0	0	0
Die PARTEI	26,508	0.4	0	43,883	0.7	0	0	0
Free Voters	33,732	0.6	0	42,133	0.7	0	0	0
Pirate Party Germany	11,340	0.2	0	27,205	0.5	0	0	0
Ecological Democratic Party	18,341	0.3	0	21,813	0.4	0	0	0
National Democratic Party	2,056	0.0	0	15,745	0.3	0	0	0
Animal Protection Alliance	2,012	0.0	0	13,506	0.2	0	0	New
Basic Income Alliance	–	–	–	10,647	0.2	0	0	New
German Centre	–	–	–	10,395	0.2	0	0	New
Democracy in Motion	–	–	–	9,241	0.2	0	0	New
Human World	652	0.0	0	7,612	0.1	0	0	New
V-Partei³	–	–	–	7,601	0.1	0	0	New
Marxist–Leninist Party	7,045	0.1	0	4,276	0.1	0	0	0
The Right	1,142	0.0	0	2,054	0.0	0	0	New
German Communist Party	–	–	–	1,006	0.0	0	0	New
Alliance C – Christians for Germany	406	0.0	0	–	–	–	0	New
Civil Rights Movement Solidarity	199	0.0	0	–	–	–	–	0
Others & Independents	7,781	0.1	0	–	–	–	0	–
Invalid/blank votes	70,712	–	–	60,975	–	–	–	–
Total	6,053,943	100	38	6,053,943	100	58	96	+18
Registered voters/turnout	7,732,597	78.3	–	7,732,597	78.3	–	–	–
Source: Federal Returning Officer

Constituency members
#	Constituency	Previous member	Elected member	Party	Votes	%	Margin	Runner-up
258	Stuttgart I	Stefan Kaufmann	Stefan Kaufmann	CDU	51,118	32.0	3,688	Cem Özdemir
259	Stuttgart II	Karin Maag	Karin Maag	CDU	46,166	33.5	20,697	Michael Jantzer
260	Böblingen	Clemens Binninger	Marc Biadacz	CDU	75,323	38.8	37,270	Jasmina Hostert
261	Esslingen	Markus Grübel	Markus Grübel	CDU	53,665	40.0	27,968	Regina Rapp
262	Nürtingen	Michael Hennrich	Michael Hennrich	CDU	65,566	39.4	33,911	Nils Schmid
263	Göppingen	Hermann Färber	Hermann Färber	CDU	50,892	37.6	21,162	Heike Baehrens
264	Waiblingen	Joachim Pfeiffer	Joachim Pfeiffer	CDU	64,958	36.8	31,060	Sybille Mack
265	Ludwigsburg	Steffen Bilger	Steffen Bilger	CDU	66,430	38.3	35,459	Macit Karaahmetoğlu
266	Neckar-Zaber	Eberhard Gienger	Eberhard Gienger	CDU	73,689	40.0	37,362	Thomas Utz
267	Heilbronn	Thomas Strobl	Alexander Throm	CDU	64,591	35.3	22,136	Josip Juratovic
268	Schwäbisch Hall – Hohenlohe	Christian von Stetten	Christian von Stetten	CDU	68,717	40.5	37,311	Annette Sawade
269	Backnang – Schwäbisch Gmünd	Norbert Barthle	Norbert Barthle	CDU	55,595	41.2	28,624	Christian Lange
270	Aalen – Heidenheim	Roderich Kiesewetter	Roderich Kiesewetter	CDU	77,752	46.4	42,588	Leni Breymaier
271	Karlsruhe-Stadt	Ingo Wellenreuther	Ingo Wellenreuther	CDU	45,821	28.5	7,897	Parsa Marvi
272	Karlsruhe-Land	Axel Fischer	Axel Fischer	CDU	67,396	40.4	34,510	Patrick Diebold
273	Rastatt	Kai Whittaker	Kai Whittaker	CDU	68,259	44.1	38,773	Gabriele Katzmarek
274	Heidelberg	Karl A. Lamers	Karl A. Lamers	CDU	58,019	32.7	11,800	Lothar Binding
275	Mannheim	Egon Jüttner	Nikolas Löbel	CDU	41,812	29.3	2,017	Stefan Rebmann
276	Odenwald – Tauber	Alois Gerig	Alois Gerig	CDU	75,531	46.8	44,682	Dorothee Schlegel
277	Rhein-Neckar	Stephan Harbarth	Stephan Harbarth	CDU	57,788	37.4	20,902	Lars Castellucci
278	Bruchsal – Schwetzingen	Olav Gutting	Olav Gutting	CDU	63,166	41.5	33,482	Nezaket Yildirim
279	Pforzheim	Gunther Krichbaum	Gunther Krichbaum	CDU	60,476	36.4	28,865	Katja Mast
280	Calw	Hans-Joachim Fuchtel	Hans-Joachim Fuchtel	CDU	65,676	43.3	40,075	Saskia Esken
281	Freiburg	Matern von Marschall	Matern von Marschall	CDU	50,256	28.0	4,141	Kerstin Andreae
282	Lörrach – Müllheim	Armin Schuster	Armin Schuster	CDU	69,148	39.4	32,162	Jonas Hoffmann
283	Emmendingen – Lahr	Peter Weiß	Peter Weiß	CDU	62,476	37.6	23,004	Johannes Fechner
284	Offenburg	Wolfgang Schäuble	Wolfgang Schäuble	CDU	73,935	48.1	47,403	Elvira Drobinski-Weiß
285	Rottweil – Tuttlingen	Volker Kauder	Volker Kauder	CDU	64,558	43.0	40,703	Georg Sattler
286	Schwarzwald-Baar	Thorsten Frei	Thorsten Frei	CDU	58,149	47.0	37,477	Jens Löw
287	Konstanz	Andreas Jung	Andreas Jung	CDU	70,355	44.8	43,959	Tobias Volz
288	Waldshut	Thomas Dörflinger	Felix Schreiner	CDU	56,528	41.9	24,006	Rita Schwarzelühr-Sutter
289	Reutlingen	Michael Donth	Michael Donth	CDU	63,494	40.8	40,097	Rebecca Hummel
290	Tübingen	Annette Widmann-Mauz	Annette Widmann-Mauz	CDU	56,446	35.7	26,249	Christian Kühn
291	Ulm	Annette Schavan	Ronja Kemmer	CDU	74,849	42.7	39,393	Hilde Mattheis
292	Biberach	Josef Rief	Josef Rief	CDU	57,837	44.5	35,803	Martin Gerster
293	Bodensee	Lothar Riebsamen	Lothar Riebsamen	CDU	56,165	41.4	31,714	Leon Hahn
294	Ravensburg	Andreas Schockenhoff	Axel Müller	CDU	55,758	38.5	26,542	Agnieszka Brugger
295	Zollernalb – Sigmaringen	Thomas Bareiß	Thomas Bareiß	CDU	61,694	45.0	41,978	Stiliani Kirgiane-Efremidou

List members
SPD	GRÜNE	FDP
1. Leni Breymaier (1); 2. Christian Lange (2); 3. Rita Schwarzelühr-Sutter (3); 4. Lothar Binding (4); 5. Hilde Mattheis (5); 6. Nils Schmid (6); 7. Katja Mast (7); 8. Martin Gerster (8); 9. Ute Vogt (9); 10. Johannes Fechner (10); 11. Gabriele Katzmarek (11); 12. Lars Castellucci (12); 13. Heike Baehrens (13); 14. Martin Rosemann (14); 15. Saskia Esken (15); 16. Josip Juratovic (16)	1. Kerstin Andreae (1); 2. Cem Özdemir (2); 3. Sylvia Kotting-Uhl (3); 4. Gerhard Schick (4); 5. Agnieszka Brugger (5); 6. Christian Kühn (6); 7. Beate Müller-Gemmeke (7); 8. Harald Ebner (8); 9. Franziska Brantner (9); 10. Matthias Gastel (10); 11. Anna Christmann (11); 12. Danyal Bayaz (12); 13. Margit Stumpp (13)	1. Michael Theurer (1); 2. Judith Skudelny (2); 3. Michael Georg Link (3); 4. Pascal Kober (4); 5. Florian Toncar (5); 6. Marcel Klinge (6); 7. Renata Alt (7); 8. Benjamin Strasser (8); 9. Jens Brandenburg (9); 10. Christoph Hoffmann (10); 11. Alexander Kulitz (11); 12. Christian Jung (12)
AfD	LINKE	
1. Alice Weidel (1); 2. Lothar Maier (2); 3. Marc Jongen (3); 4. Markus Frohnmaier (4); 5. Thomas Seitz (5); 6. Jürgen Braun (6); 7. Martin Hess (7); 8. Volker Münz (8); 9. Marc Bernhard (9); 10. Dirk Spaniel (10); 11. Franziska Gminder (11)	1. Bernd Riexinger (1); 2. Heike Hänsel (2); 3. Gökay Akbulut (3); 4. Tobias Pflüger (4); 5. Jessica Tatti (5); 6. Michel Brandt (6)	

=== Saarland ===
Party	Constituency			Party list			Total seats	+/–
Party	Votes	%	Seats	Votes	%	Seats	Total seats	+/–
Christian Democratic Union (CDU)	211,855	36.2	3	189,573	32.4	0	3	−1
Social Democratic Party (SPD)	184,511	31.5	1	158,895	27.1	2	3	0
The Left (DIE LINKE)	65,712	11.2	0	75,448	12.9	1	1	0
Alternative for Germany (AfD)	54,587	9.3	0	58,920	10.1	1	1	+1
Free Democratic Party (FDP)	27,627	4.7	0	44,477	7.6	1	1	+1
Alliance 90/The Greens (GRÜNE)	26,116	4.5	0	35,117	6.0	1	1	0
Die PARTEI	3,950	0.7	0	7,475	1.3	0	0	0
Free Voters	6,959	1.2	0	4,825	0.8	0	0	0
National Democratic Party	947	0.2	0	3,106	0.5	0	0	0
Pirate Party Germany	2,325	0.4	0	2,937	0.5	0	0	0
V-Partei³	–	–	–	1.,14	0.3	0	0	New
Basic Income Alliance	–	–	–	1,025	0.2	0	0	New
German Centre	–	–	–	886	0.2	0	0	New
Party of Reason	242	0.0	0	533	0.1	0	0	0
Marxist–Leninist Party	572	0.1	0	427	0.1	0	0	0
Invalid/blank votes	10,008	–	–	10,153	–	–	–	–
Total	595,411	100	4	595,411	100	6	10	+1
Registered voters/turnout	777,264	76.6	–	777,264	76.6	–	–	–
Source: Federal Returning Officer

Constituency members
#	Constituency	Previous member	Elected member	Party	Votes	%	Margin	Runner-up
296	Saarbrücken	Anette Hübinger	Josephine Ortleb	SPD	46,688	32.1	1,024	Bernd Wegner
297	Saarlouis	Peter Altmaier	Peter Altmaier	CDU	60,102	38.0	9,430	Heiko Maas
298	St. Wendel	Nadine Schön	Nadine Schön	CDU	57,987	41.8	15,858	Christian Petry
299	Homburg	Alexander Funk	Markus Uhl	CDU	48,102	33.6	3,080	Esra Limbacher

List members
SPD	LINKE	AfD
1. Heiko Maas (1); 2. Christian Petry (2)	1. Thomas Lutze (1)	1. Christian Wirth (1)
FDP	GRÜNE	
1. Oliver Luksic (1)	1. Markus Tressel (1)	

== Gallery ==
CDU-CSU vote

SPD vote

AfD vote

FDP vote

Linke vote

Grüne vote

NPD vote

Turnout
