= Veronika Bellmann =

German politician and member of the CDU

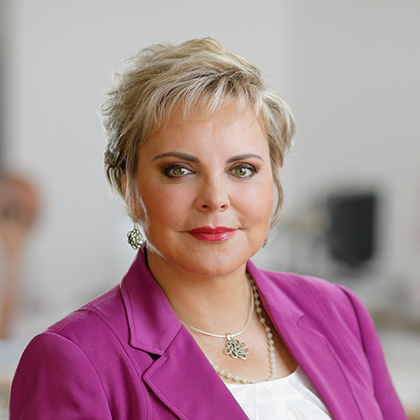
Veronika Bellmann

Veronika Maria Bellmann (née Wächter; born 20 November 1960 in Chemnitz, then Karl-Marx-Stadt in East Germany) is a German politician and member of the CDU.

She was Member of the German Bundestag for Mittelsachsen from 2002 until 2021, in which she lost her seat to Carolin Bachmann from the AfD.
