= Philipp Hartewig =

German politician (born 1994)

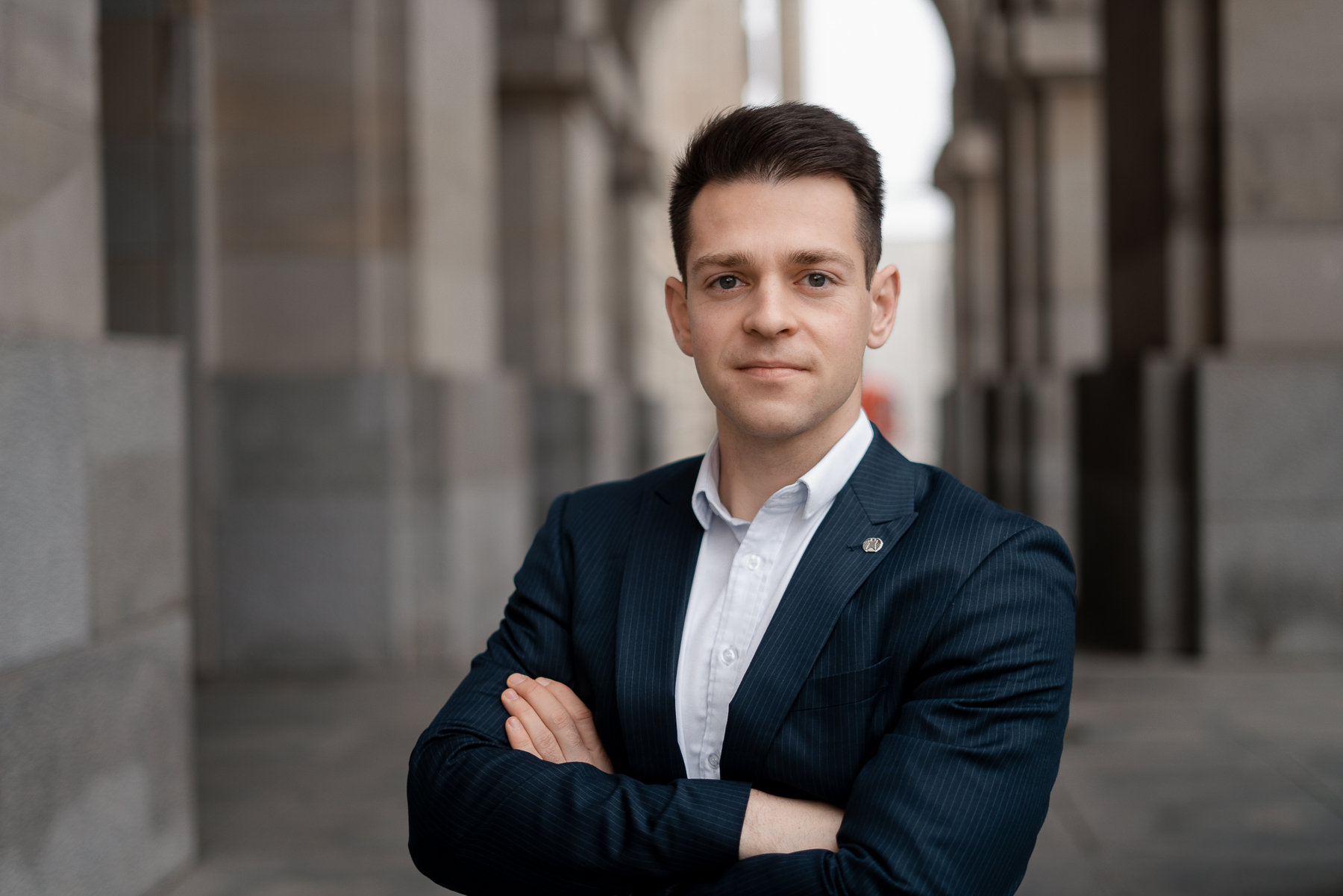
Philipp Hartewig in front of the Reichstag building

Philipp Hartewig (born 5 October 1994 in Chemnitz, Saxony ) is a German politician of the Free Democratic Party (FDP) who served as a member of the Bundestag from 2021 to 2025.

== Life ==
Philipp Hartewig studied law at the Leipzig University and Charles University in Prague after attending school in Lichtenau and Mittweida. Following his time as articled clerk, he passed his second state law examination in Dresden in 2021. In 2022 Hartewig was admitted to the bar as attorney at law. He is non-denominational and single.

== Political career ==
Hartewig has been a member of the Young Liberals since 2010. From 2015 to 2018, he was state chairman of the Young Liberal Action Saxony. He has been a member of the state executive committee of the Saxon FDP since 2015, from 2019 to 2021 as its deputy state chairman. On November 6, 2021, at the state party conference, he was elected secretary general of the FDP Saxony under the newly elected state chairwoman Anita Maaß.

For the 2021 federal election, Hartewig ran for the direct mandate in constituency 161 (Central Saxony). He was elected to the Bundestag via the state list (third place) of his party. In the 20th German Bundestag, Hartewig was a member of the Committee on Legal Affairs and the Sports Committee. He served as his parliamentary group's spokesperson for sports politics.
