= Robby Schlund =

German politician

Member of the Bundestag
- Incumbent
- Assumed office 24 October 2017

Personal details
- Born: 19 February 1967 (age 59)
- Party: AfD

Robby Schlund (born 19 February 1967) is a German politician for the populist Alternative for Germany (AfD) party and from 2017 to 2021 member of the Bundestag, the federal legislative body.

== Biography ==
Schlund was born 1967 in the East German town of Gera and was a professional soldier in the state socialist National People's Army of the GDR.

Schlund entered the newly founded populist AfD and delineates himself as a member of the right-wing factional cluster 'Der Flügel' (the wing) around Björn Höcke.

After the 2017 German federal election he became a member of the Bundestag.
