= Marc Jongen =

German politician (born 1968)

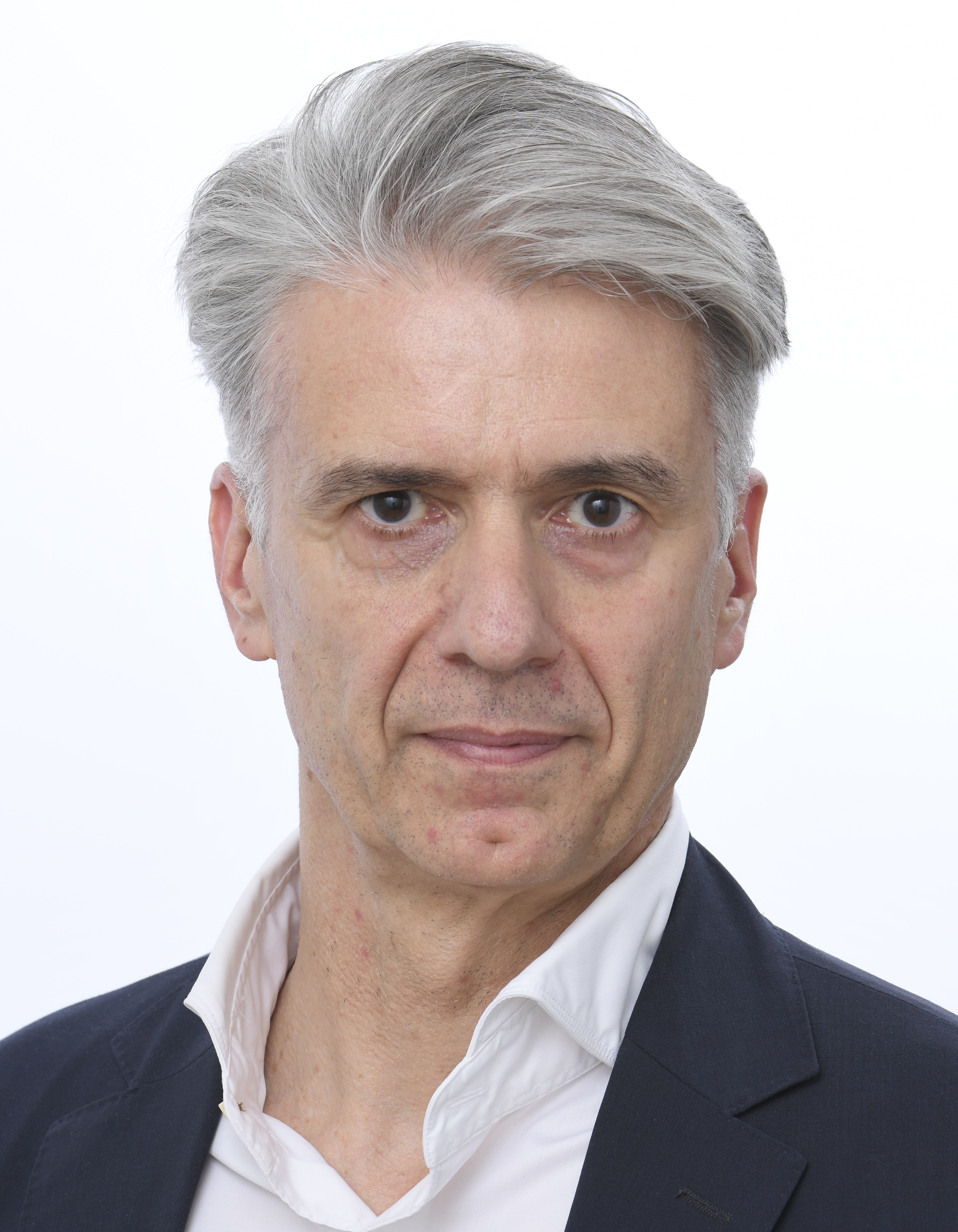

Member of the Bundestag
- In office 24 October 2017 – 2024

Member of the European Parliament
- Incumbent
- Assumed office July 2024

Personal details
- Born: 23 May 1968 (age 58)
- Party: AfD

Marc Stephan Jongen (born 23 May 1968) is a German politician (AfD). From 2003 to 2017 he was a research assistant for philosophy at the Staatliche Hochschule für Gestaltung Karlsruhe.

Jongen is regarded as a "party philosopher" of the right-wing AfD, having been called "chief ideologue" or "thought leader". He was the chairman of AfD Baden-Württemberg from March 2017 to February 2019 and has been its Deputy State leader ever since. With relatively high ranks on the AfD BW state list of candidates, he was elected to the Bundestag for the first time in the 2017 federal election, again in 2021, and to the European Parliament in 2024. His seat in the Bundestag was taken by Volker Münz.

== Biography ==
=== Origins ===
Jongen was born in Merano and grew up in Lana, South Tyrol. He had Dutch nationality through his father and Italian nationality through his mother.

=== Education and academia ===
He studied economics from 1987 to 1988 at the University of Vienna. Subsequently and until 1995, he studied philosophy, indology, German history, and philosophy of science. After three months in India, he wrote a master's thesis in 1996 entitled The essence of spiritual knowledge from the Advaita Vedanta Shri Shakaracharyas, which was published by Eugen Diederichs in 1998.

Between 1996 and 1999, he wrote for the Neue Südtiroler Tageszeitung in Bolzano, and worked on a "Philosophy of Astrology". In 1999, he started a PhD at the State University for Design (HfG) of Karlsruhe under Peter Sloterdijk, supported by the Leopold Ziegler foundation. From 2001 to 2003, he was supported by the state of Baden-Württemberg. In 2009, he obtained his PhD in philosophy and in 2011, received German citizenship.

In mid-October 2017, Jongen gave a lecture entitled “Does Democracy Need to be More Populist?” at the Hannah Arendt Center of Bard College in New York, on the occasion of the conference “Crises of Democracy: Thinking in Dark Times.” Jongen’s invitation to speak by the Hannah Arendt Center was criticized by professors in the US. The content and form of the lecture were also negatively assessed in the German press: The Frankfurter Allgemeine Zeitung called Jongen’s remarks “philosophically weak,” and Die Zeit compared them to a “beer tent speech” that consisted “solely of politically agitational claims that can be found in a similar form in the AfD party platform.”

=== Ideology ===
Stuttgarter Zeitung noted that Jongen has failed to adequately distance himself from the far-right Flügel faction of the party, led by Björn Höcke. Jongen also said that there are "differences in mentality between East and West Germany".
