= Lars Herrmann =

German police officer and politician

Member of the Bundestag
- In office 24 October 2017 – 26 October 2021

Personal details
- Born: 12 April 1977 (age 48)
- Party: CDU (2022-), AfD (2013-2019)

Lars Herrmann (born 12 April 1977) is a German police officer and politician for the Christian Democratic Union (CDU), having been a member of the Alternative for Germany (AfD) from 2013 until 2019. From 2017 to 2021, he was a member of the Bundestag, the federal legislative body. He used to a member of the völkisch-nationalistic Flügel of the AfD.

== Life and politics ==
Hermann was born 1977 in the East German town of Leisnig and became a police officer at the Federal Police (Bundespolizei).

Hermann entered the newly founded AfD in March 2013. He was said to be a fan of Frauke Petry, till she stepped out of the party.

He became a member of the Bundestag after the 2017 German federal election.

In 2019 Herrmann and some other AfD politicians signed a letter, in which the leader of Flüggel Björn Höcke got asked to concentrate on his legitimated position as chairman of AfD Thuringia and not to split the whole party nationwide.
