= Carolin Bachmann =

German politician (born 1988)

Member of the Bundestag for Mittelsachsen
- Incumbent
- Assumed office 2021

Personal details
- Born: 3 September 1988 (age 37) Freiberg, Saxony, Germany (then East Germany)
- Party: AFD

Carolin Bachmann (born 3 September 1988) is a German politician from Alternative for Germany (AfD). She has been Member of the German Bundestag for Mittelsachsen in Saxony since 2021.

== Life ==
Bachmann completed training as a bank clerk at DekaBank Deutsche Girozentrale in Frankfurt/Main. She later studied business administration (B.A.) at Hessische Berufsakademie.

She worked in customer service at a capital management company and in institutional major customer sales.

== Politics ==
Bachmann became member of the AfD in 2018. She was elected as Member of the German Bundestag for Mittelsachsen in Saxony in 2021. Bachmann is a member of the parliament committee for housing, city planning and communal affairs.

Bachmann speaks out in favor of nuclear power.
