= Volker Münz =

German politician

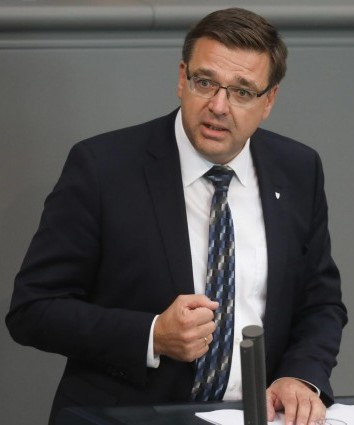

Member of the Bundestag
- Incumbent
- Assumed office 16 July 2024
- In office 24 October 2017 – 2021

Personal details
- Born: 8 August 1964 (age 61) Verden (Aller)
- Party: AfD

Volker Münz (born 8 August 1964 in Verden (Aller)) is a German banker and politician (Alternative for Germany). He is member of the nationalist wing Der Flügel and from 2017 to 2021 member of German Bundestag.

Münz worked in a bank and studied economic science at Universität Hannover. His last position was head of a department in Hypovereinsbank.

Münz spoke in the summer of 2019 against a candidacy of the Thuringia parliamentary leader Björn Höcke as federal chairman of AfD. He feared a consolidation of polarization within AfD if the prominent representative of the national wing came on the federal executive committee. "We do not need any sharp comments, we also do not need an inappropriate style." He criticized Höcke's style at the Kyffhäuser meeting. There, he had massively attacked the AfD Federal Board and asked his critics to leave the party. "He talks about unity, but he splits," said Münz in 2019.

In July 2024, he returned to the Bundestag, replacing Marc Jongen. In October 2024 he announced that he was not seeking re-election for Bundestag.
