= Detlev Spangenberg =

German politician

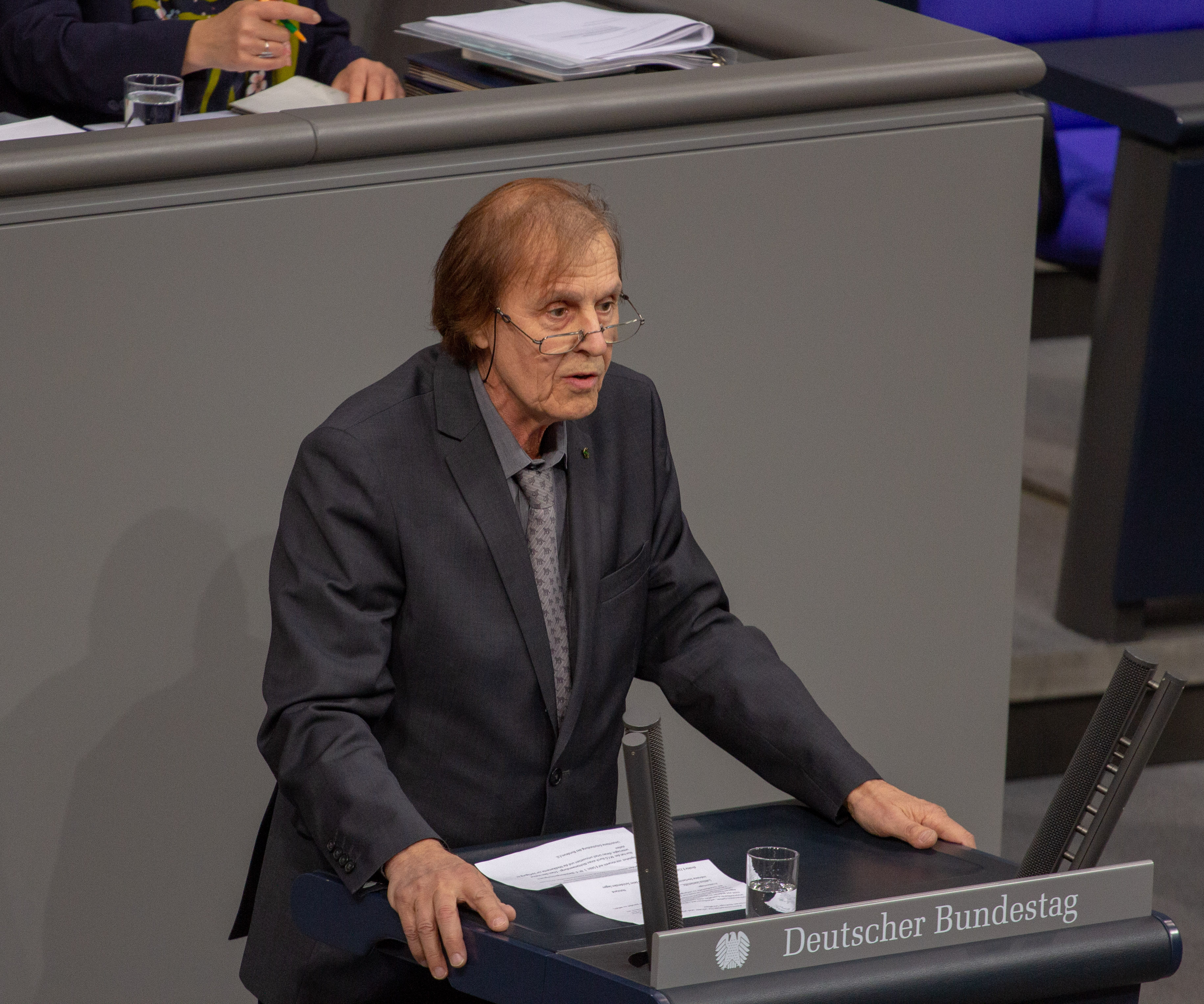
- Detlev Spangenberg in 2019

Member of the Bundestag
- Incumbent
- Assumed office 2017

Personal details
- Born: 10 April 1944 (age 80); Chemnitz, East Germany
- Political party: AfD

Detlev Spangenberg (born 10 April 1944) is a German politician who represents the Alternative for Germany (AfD). He has served as a member of the Bundestag from the state of Saxony since 2017.

== Biography ==
Spangenberg was born in Chemnitz, Saxony. During military service in East Germany, he was a spy for the Stasi. He became member of the Bundestag after the 2017 German federal election. He is a member of the Committee on Petitions and the Committee on Health.
