= Edgar Franke =

German politician (born 1960)

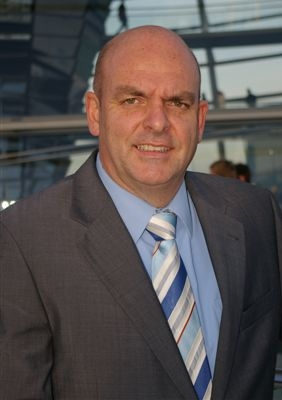
- Franke in 2009

Member of the Bundestag; for Schwalm-Eder
- In office 27 October 2009 – 25 March 2025
- Preceded by: Gerd Höfer
- Succeeded by: Seat vacant

Personal details
- Born: 21 January 1960 (age 66) Gudensberg, West Germany
- Party: Social Democratic
- Children: 2
- Education: University of Marburg; University of Giessen

Edgar Franke (born 21 January 1960) is a German politician of the Social Democratic Party (SPD) who served as a member of the Bundestag from the state of Hesse from 2009 2025.

In addition to his parliamentary work, Franke served as Parliamentary State Secretary at the Federal Ministry of Health in the government of Chancellor Olaf Scholz from 2021 to 2025.

== Early life and education ==
After graduating from the Albert-Schweitzer-School in Kassel and his civilian service with the district association of the Arbeiterwohlfahrt in Kassel, Franke studied political science and law in Marburg and Gießen. He passed the 1st state examination in law at the Justus-Liebig-University in Gießen and the 2nd state examination in law at the regional court in Kassel.

== Political career ==
Franke first became a member of the Bundestag in the 2009 German federal election, representing the Schwalm-Eder district. He was a member of the Committee on Health, which he chaired from 2014 until 2017. He also served as a member of the Committee on Legal Affairs from 2009 until 2016.

In addition to his committee assignments, Franke has been co-chairing the German-Iranian Parliamentary Friendship Group since 2018.

In 2018, Federal Minister of Justice Katarina Barley appointed Franke as the government's official commissioner for the victims of terrorist attacks. He served in this position until 2022.

Within his parliamentary group, Franke belongs to the Seeheim Circle.

In 2024, Franke announced that he would not seek re-election for the Bundestag.

== Other activities ==
- Kurt Schumacher Society, Member of the Board
- German United Services Trade Union (ver.di), Member
