= Ulrich Oehme =

German politician

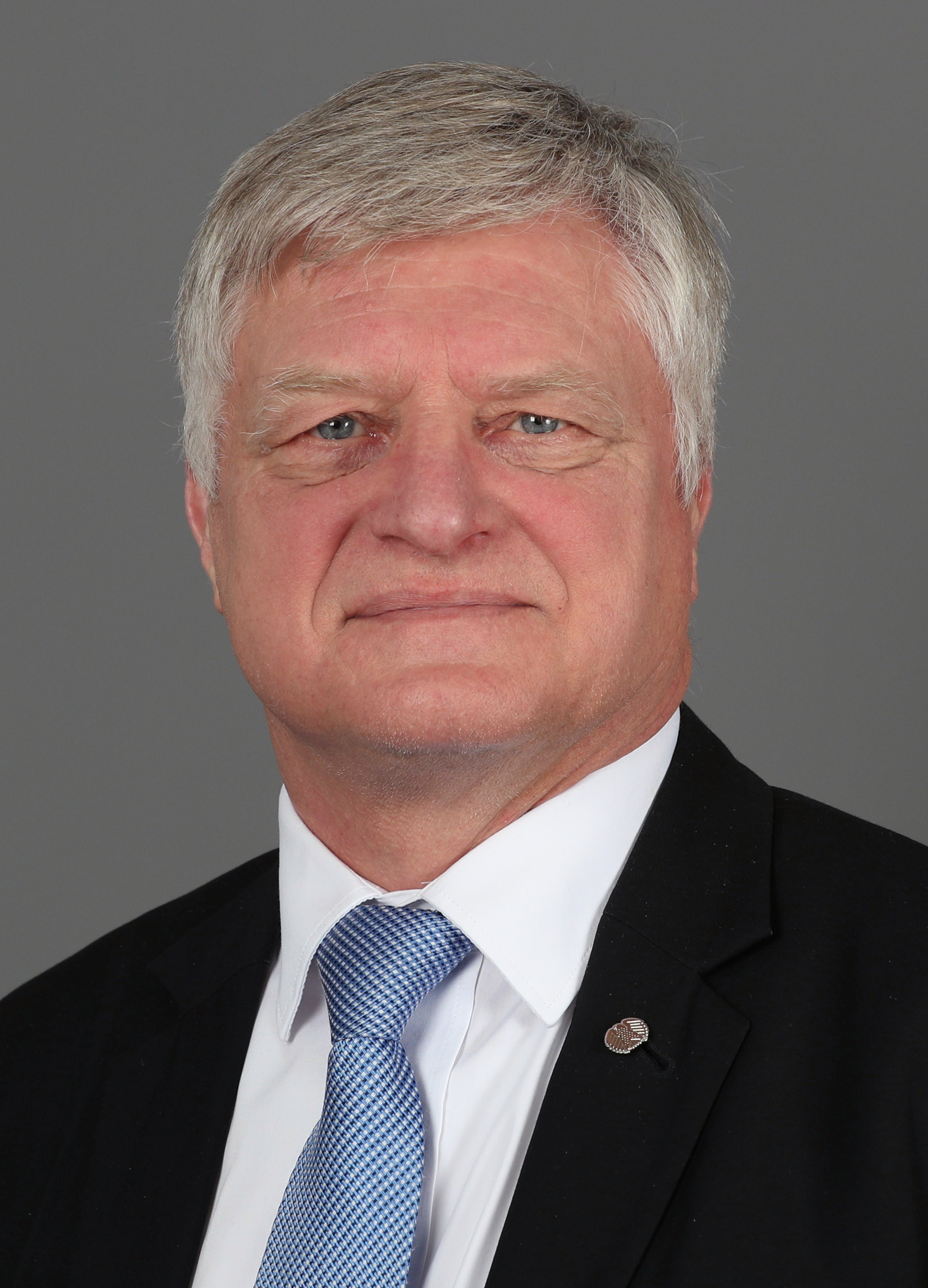
- Oehme in 2020

Member of the Bundestag
- Incumbent
- Assumed office 2017

Personal details
- Born: 7 February 1960 (age 66) Bischofswerda, East Germany (now Germany)
- Party: AfD

Ulrich Oehme (born 7 February 1960) is a German politician. He represents Alternative for Germany (AfD). Ulrich Oehme has served as a member of the Bundestag from the state of Saxony since 2017.

== Life ==
Oehme was born in Bischofswerda, Saxony. He became member of the Bundestag after the 2017 German federal election. He is a member of the Committee on Economic Cooperation and Development.
