= Bettina Hoffmann (politician) =

German politician (born 1960)

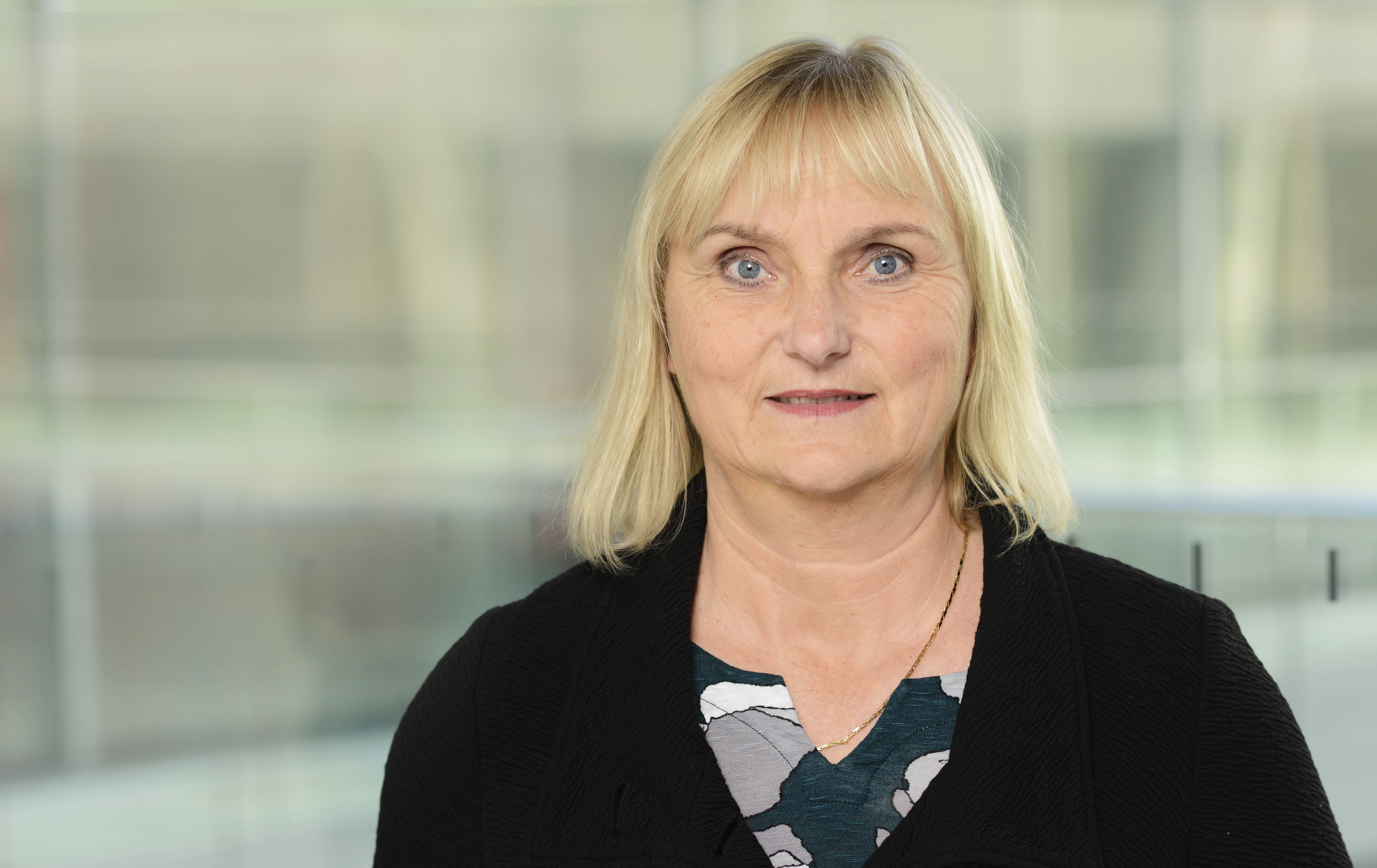

Member of the Bundestag
- Incumbent
- Assumed office 2017

Personal details
- Born: 18 January 1960 (age 66) Philippsthal, West Germany
- Party: Greens
- Education: University of Marburg

Bettina Hoffmann (born 18 January 1960) is a German politician of the Alliance 90/The Greens who has been serving as a member of the Bundestag since 2017.

In addition to her parliamentary work, Hoffmann served as Parliamentary State Secretary at the Federal Ministry for the Environment, Nature Conservation, Nuclear Safety and Consumer Protection in the coalition government of Chancellor Olaf Scholz from 2021 to 2025.

== Early life and career ==
After graduating from high school, studying biology and obtaining her doctorate at the University of Marburg, Hoffmann worked in her profession. From 1999 to 2017 she was managing director of an agency for planning and communication. Hoffman is married, mother of two children and of Protestant denomination.

== Political career ==
Hoffmann became a member of the Bundestag in the 2017 German federal election, representing the Schwalm-Eder district. She has since been serving on the Committee on the Environment, Nature Conservation and Nuclear Safety and on the Parliamentary Advisory Board on Sustainable Development. In addition to her committee assignments, she is part of the Parliamentary Friendship Group for Relations with the Andes States (Bolivia, Ecuador, Colombia, Peru, Venezuela).

Ahead of the 2017 elections, Hoffmann was elected to lead her party's campaign in the state of Hesse, replacing Daniela Wagner. In the negotiations to form a so-called traffic light coalition of the Social Democratic Party (SPD), the Green Party and the Free Democratic Party (FDP) following the 2021 elections, she was part of her party's delegation in the working group on environmental policy, co-chaired by Rita Schwarzelühr-Sutter, Steffi Lemke and Stefan Birkner.

== Other activities ==
- German Federal Environmental Foundation (DBU), Member of the Board of Trustees (since 2022)
