= Mittelsachsen (electoral district) =

Federal electoral district of Germany

160 Mittelsachsen
- Electoral district for the Bundestag
- Mittelsachsen in 2025
- State: Saxony
- Population: 240,300 (2019)
- Electorate: 193,828 (2021)
- Major settlements: Freiberg; Döbeln; Frankenberg
- Area: 1,675.6 km^{2}

Current electoral district
- Created: 2009
- Party: AfD
- Member: Carolin Bachmann
- Elected: 2021, 2025

Mittelsachsen (English: Central Saxony) is an electoral constituency (German: Wahlkreis) represented in the Bundestag. It elects one member via first-past-the-post voting. Under the current constituency numbering system, it is designated as constituency 169. It is located in central Saxony, comprising most of the Mittelsachsen district.

Mittelsachsen was created for the 2009 federal election. Since 2021, it has been represented by Carolin Bachmann of Alternative for Germany (AfD).

== Geography ==
Mittelsachsen is located in central Saxony. As of the 2021 federal election, it comprises the entirety of the Mittelsachsen district excluding the municipalities of Claußnitz, Erlau, Geringswalde, Hartmannsdorf, Königshain-Wiederau, Lichtenau, Lunzenau, Penig, and Wechselburg and the Verwaltungsgemeinschaften of Burgstädt and Rochlitz.

== History ==
Mittelsachsen was created in 2009 and contained parts of the abolished constituencies of Döbeln – Mittweida – Meißen II and Freiberg – Mittlerer Erzgebirgskreis. In the 2009 election, it was constituency 162 in the numbering system. In the 2013 through 2021 elections, it was number 161. From the 2025 election, it has been number 160. Its borders have not changed since its creation.

== Members ==
The constituency was first represented by Veronika Bellmann of the Christian Democratic Union (CDU) from 2009 to 2021. It was won by Carolin Bachmann of the Alternative for Germany (AfD) in 2021.

Election	Member	Party	%
2009	Veronika Bellmann	CDU	43.6
2013	Veronika Bellmann	CDU	51.9
2017	Veronika Bellmann	CDU	32.4
2021	Carolin Bachmann	AfD	33.4
2025	Carolin Bachmann	AfD	45.4

== Election results ==
=== 2025 election ===
Federal election (2025): Mittelsachsen
Notes:	Blue background denotes the winner of the electorate vote. Pink background denotes a candidate elected from their party list. Yellow background denotes an electorate win by a list member, or other incumbent. A ✓ or ✗ denotes status of any incumbent, win or lose respectively.						
Party	Candidate	Votes	%	±%	Party votes	%	±%
AfD	✓ Carolin Bachmann	66,689	45.4	▲11.9	64,097	43.5	▲13.4
CDU	Johann Haupt	39,663	27.0	▲3.2	30,403	20.6	▲3.1
BSW					13,920	9.4	New
SPD	Ralf Walper	13,320	9.1	▼8.6	11,145	7.6	▼10.9
Left	Nicole Weichhold	13,233	9.0	▲0.7	11,800	8.0	0.0
FW	Mark Sontowski	6,156	4.2	New	2,966	2.0	▼0.2
FDP	Philipp Hartewig	4,284	2.9	▼7.0	4,676	3.2	▼8.4
Greens	Sebastian Walter	3,680	2.5	▼1.2	5,172	3.5	▼1.2
Tierschutzpartei					1,525	1.0	▼0.9
Volt					575	0.4	▲0.2
PARTEI					561	0.4	▼0.6
BD					275	0.2	New
Pirates					182	0.1	▼0.2
Humanists					146	0.1	▼0.1
MLPD					43	<0.1	0.0
Informal votes		1,329			868		
Total valid votes		147,025			147,486		
Turnout		148,354	78.9	▲2.7			
AfD hold	Majority	27,026	18.4	▲8.8			

=== 2021 election ===
Federal election (2021): Mittelsachsen
Notes:	Blue background denotes the winner of the electorate vote. Pink background denotes a candidate elected from their party list. Yellow background denotes an electorate win by a list member, or other incumbent. A ✓ or ✗ denotes status of any incumbent, win or lose respectively.						
Party	Candidate	Votes	%	±%	Party votes	%	±%
AfD	Carolin Bachmann	48,725	33.4	▲1.9	43,821	30.0	▼1.2
CDU	✗ Veronika Bellmann	34,638	23.8	▼8.7	25,603	17.5	▼10.1
SPD	Alexander Geißler	25,727	17.7	▲5.7	27,000	18.5	▲8.8
FDP	Philipp Hartewig	14,420	9.9	▲4.1	16,897	11.6	▲3.7
Left	Stefan Hartmann	12,164	8.3	▼5.6	11,687	8.0	▼6.5
Greens	Lea Ursula Fränzl	5,398	3.7	▲0.6	6,822	4.7	▲1.9
FW					3,206	2.2	▲1.2
Tierschutzpartei					2,860	2.0	▲0.6
dieBasis	Thomas Linke	3,397	2.3		2,446	1.7	
PARTEI					1,366	0.9	0.0
Gesundheitsforschung					774	0.5	
NPD					713	0.5	▼0.8
ÖDP	Marcus Lieder	1,259	0.9		549	0.4	▲0.1
Pirates					514	0.4	▼0.1
Volt					336	0.2	
Team Todenhöfer					292	0.2	
Bündnis C					281	0.2	
The III. Path					257	0.2	
Humanists					246	0.2	
V-Partei3					120	0.1	0.0
DKP					116	0.1	
MLPD					86	0.1	0.0
Informal votes		2,005			1,741		
Total valid votes		145,728			145,992		
Turnout		147,733	76.2	▲1.5			
AfD gain from CDU	Majority	14,087	9.6				

=== 2017 election ===
Federal election (2017): Mittelsachsen
Notes:	Blue background denotes the winner of the electorate vote. Pink background denotes a candidate elected from their party list. Yellow background denotes an electorate win by a list member, or other incumbent. A ✓ or ✗ denotes status of any incumbent, win or lose respectively.						
Party	Candidate	Votes	%	±%	Party votes	%	±%
CDU	✓ Veronika Bellmann	48,230	32.4	▼19.5	41,189	27.7	▼17.7
AfD	Heiko Hessenkemper	46,827	31.5		46,522	31.2	▲25.0
Left	Falk Neubert	20,785	14.0	▼6.4	21,582	14.5	▼6.1
SPD	Simone Raatz	17,782	12.0	▼3.5	14,487	9.7	▼3.6
FDP	Philipp Hartewig	8,652	5.8	▲3.6	11,767	7.9	▲4.5
Greens	Matthias Wagner	4,626	3.1	▼0.1	4,112	2.8	▼0.5
NPD					1,967	1.3	▼2.4
Tierschutzpartei					1,960	1.3	
FW					1,549	1.0	▼0.2
PARTEI					1,442	1.0	
Pirates					651	0.4	▼1.7
ÖDP					350	0.2	
BGE					346	0.2	
DiB					253	0.2	
V-Partei³					174	0.1	
BüSo	Matthias Stoll	1,772	1.2		384	0.3	▲0.1
MLPD					154	0.1	0.0
Informal votes		1,974			1,759		
Total valid votes		148,674			148,889		
Turnout		150,648	74.7	▲5.6			
CDU hold	Majority	1,403	0.9	▼30.7			

=== 2013 election ===
Federal election (2013): Mittelsachsen
Notes:	Blue background denotes the winner of the electorate vote. Pink background denotes a candidate elected from their party list. Yellow background denotes an electorate win by a list member, or other incumbent. A ✓ or ✗ denotes status of any incumbent, win or lose respectively.						
Party	Candidate	Votes	%	±%	Party votes	%	±%
CDU	✓ Veronika Bellmann	74,209	51.9	▲8.3	64,971	45.3	▲6.8
Left	Lothar Schmidt	29,079	20.3	▼2.8	29,525	20.6	▼3.9
SPD	Simone Raatz	22,079	15.4	▲0.7	19,070	13.3	▲0.1
AfD					8,997	6.3	
NPD	Heidelore Karsten	6,702	4.7	▲0.2	5,305	3.7	▼0.7
Greens	Sebastian Tröbs	4,583	3.2	▼1.0	4,703	3.3	▼1.1
FDP	Marco Weißbach	3,203	2.2	▼7.7	4,933	3.4	▼10.5
Pirates	Stephan Pschera	3,131	2.2		3,042	2.1	
FW					1,848	1.3	
PRO					634	0.4	
BüSo					207	0.1	▼0.4
MLPD					139	0.1	▼0.1
Informal votes		2,592			2,204		
Total valid votes		142,986			143,374		
Turnout		145,578	69.1	▲4.7			
CDU hold	Majority	45,130	31.6	▲11.2			

=== 2009 election ===
Federal election (2009): Mittelsachsen
Notes:	Blue background denotes the winner of the electorate vote. Pink background denotes a candidate elected from their party list. Yellow background denotes an electorate win by a list member, or other incumbent. A ✓ or ✗ denotes status of any incumbent, win or lose respectively.						
Party	Candidate	Votes	%	±%	Party votes	%	±%
CDU	Veronika Bellmann	61,579	43.6	▲4.7	54,525	38.5	▲5.6
Left	Lothar Schmidt	32,744	23.2	▲1.5	34,630	24.5	▲1.5
SPD	Simone Raatz	20,800	14.7	▼6.6	18,677	13.2	▼8.4
FDP	Sandro Dierbeck	14,032	9.9	▲1.6	19,726	13.9	▲3.1
NPD	Peter Naumann	6,320	4.5	▼1.4	6,200	4.4	▼1.3
Greens	Claudia Glanz	5,921	4.2	▲1.9	6,208	4.4	▲1.1
BüSo					803	0.6	0.0
REP					483	0.3	▼0.1
MLPD					315	0.2	▲0.1
Informal votes		2,294			2,123		
Total valid votes		141,396			141,567		
Turnout		143,690	64.4	▼12.0			
CDU win new seat	Majority	28,835	20.4				
