= Hamburg-Eimsbüttel (electoral district) =

Federal electoral district of Germany

20 Hamburg-Eimsbüttel
- Electoral district for the Bundestag
- Hamburg-Eimsbüttel in 2025
- State: Hamburg
- Population: 260,300 (2019)
- Electorate: 193,823 (2021)
- Major settlements: Eimsbüttel
- Area: 49.6 km^{2}

Current electoral district
- Created: 1949
- Party: GRÜNE
- Member: Till Steffen
- Elected: 2021, 2025

Hamburg-Eimsbüttel is an electoral constituency (German: Wahlkreis) represented in the Bundestag. It elects one member via first-past-the-post voting. Under the current constituency numbering system, it is designated as constituency 20. It is located in northwestern Hamburg, comprising the Eimsbüttel borough.

Hamburg-Eimsbüttel was created for the inaugural 1949 federal election. Since 2021, it has been represented by Till Steffen of the Alliance 90/The Greens.

== Geography ==
Hamburg-Eimsbüttel is located in northwestern Hamburg. As of the 2021 federal election, it is coterminous with the borough of Eimsbüttel.

== History ==
Hamburg-Eimsbüttel was created in 1949, then known as Hamburg III. From 1965 through 1976, it was simply named Eimsbüttel. It acquired its current name in the 1980 election. In the inaugural Bundestag election, it was Hamburg constituency 1 in the numbering system. From 1953 through 1961, it was number 17. From 1965 through 1998, it was number 14. From 2002 through 2009, it was number 21. Since 2013, it has been constituency 20.

Originally, it comprised the entirety of the Eimsbüttel borough with the exception of the quarters of Rotherbaum, Harvestehude, and Hoheluft-West, and with the Ortsteile of Altona-Nord/Ost und Altona-Nord/Nord from the quarter of Altona-Nord. Since the 1965 election, it has been coterminous with the Eimsbüttel borough.

Election	No.	Name	Borders
1949	1	Hamburg III	Eimsbüttel borough (excluding Rotherbaum, Harvestehude, and Hoheluft-West quarters); Altona borough (only Altona-Nord/Ost and Altona-Nord/Nord Ortsteile)
1953	17	Hamburg III	Eimsbüttel borough (excluding Rotherbaum, Harvestehude, and Hoheluft-West quarters); Altona borough (only Altona-Nord/Ost and Altona-Nord/Nord Ortsteile)
1957	17	Hamburg III	Eimsbüttel borough (excluding Rotherbaum, Harvestehude, and Hoheluft-West quarters); Altona borough (only Altona-Nord/Ost and Altona-Nord/Nord Ortsteile)
1961	17	Hamburg III	Eimsbüttel borough (excluding Rotherbaum, Harvestehude, and Hoheluft-West quarters); Altona borough (only Altona-Nord/Ost and Altona-Nord/Nord Ortsteile)
1965	14	Eimsbüttel	Eimsbüttel borough
1969	14	Eimsbüttel	Eimsbüttel borough
1972	14	Eimsbüttel	Eimsbüttel borough
1976	14	Eimsbüttel	Eimsbüttel borough
1980	14	Hamburg-Eimsbüttel	Eimsbüttel borough
1983	14	Hamburg-Eimsbüttel	Eimsbüttel borough
1987	14	Hamburg-Eimsbüttel	Eimsbüttel borough
1990	14	Hamburg-Eimsbüttel	Eimsbüttel borough
1994	14	Hamburg-Eimsbüttel	Eimsbüttel borough
1998	14	Hamburg-Eimsbüttel	Eimsbüttel borough
2002	21	Hamburg-Eimsbüttel	Eimsbüttel borough
2005	21	Hamburg-Eimsbüttel	Eimsbüttel borough
2009	21	Hamburg-Eimsbüttel	Eimsbüttel borough
2013	20	Hamburg-Eimsbüttel	Eimsbüttel borough
2017	20	Hamburg-Eimsbüttel	Eimsbüttel borough
2021	20	Hamburg-Eimsbüttel	Eimsbüttel borough
2025	20	Hamburg-Eimsbüttel	Eimsbüttel borough

== Members ==
The constituency has been held by the Social Democratic Party (SPD) during all but five Bundestag terms since 1949; it returned a representative from the SPD in every federal election from 1957 until 2009. Its first representative was Gerd Bucerius of the CDU. In 1953, the constituency was won by Fritz Becker of the German Party (DP), who served for a single term. Blachstein won the constituency back for the SPD in 1957. In 1969, he was succeeded by Wilhelm Nölling, who was in turn succeeded in 1976 by Peter Paterna, who served until 1994, and then by Angelika Mertens until 2002. Niels Annen won the constituency in 2005. In 2009, Rüdiger Kruse of the Christian Democratic Union (CDU) became the first non-SPD member since 1953; he was defeated in 2013 by Niels Annen, who was re-elected in 2017. In 2021, Till Steffen of the Greens won the constituency.

Election	Member	Party	%
1949	Gerd Bucerius	CDU	37.6
1953	Fritz Becker	DP	47.7
1957	Peter Blachstein	SPD	47.6
1961	Peter Blachstein	SPD	47.9
1965	Peter Blachstein	SPD	47.1
1969	Wilhelm Nölling	SPD	55.9
1972	Wilhelm Nölling	SPD	58.7
1976	Peter Paterna	SPD	52.2
1980	Peter Paterna	SPD	52.5
1983	Peter Paterna	SPD	49.2
1987	Peter Paterna	SPD	41.5
1990	Peter Paterna	SPD	43.5
1994	Angelika Mertens	SPD	40.9
1998	Angelika Mertens	SPD	50.0
2002	Angelika Mertens	SPD	51.3
2005	Niels Annen	SPD	45.1
2009	Rüdiger Kruse	CDU	31.1
2013	Niels Annen	SPD	37.5
2017	Niels Annen	SPD	31.6
2021	Till Steffen	GRÜNE	29.8
2025	Till Steffen	GRÜNE	27.8

== Election results ==
=== 2025 election ===
Federal election (2025): Hamburg-Eimsbüttel
Notes:	Blue background denotes the winner of the electorate vote. Pink background denotes a candidate elected from their party list. Yellow background denotes an electorate win by a list member, or other incumbent. A ✓ or ✗ denotes status of any incumbent, win or lose respectively.						
Party	Candidate	Votes	%	±%	Party votes	%	±%
Greens	✓ Till Steffen	45,766	27.8	▼2.0	39,549	24.0	▼6.0
SPD	Wolfgang Schmidt	42,720	26.0	▼3.6	36,884	22.3	▼5.7
CDU	Roland Heintze	34,476	20.9	▲3.8	33,328	20.2	▲5.3
Left	Nikolai Drews	20,727	12.6	▲5.5	23,991	14.5	▲7.8
AfD	Alexander Wolf	12,671	7.7	▲4.3	12,450	7.5	▲4.0
FDP	Ria Schröder	6,658	4.0	▼4.1	8,099	4.9	▼6.4
BSW					5,377	3.3	New
Volt					2,703	1.6	▲1.1
Tierschutzpartei					1,319	0.8	▼0.2
PARTEI					633	0.4	▼0.5
FW	Jan Schacker	1,554	0.9	▲0.3	472	0.3	▼0.2
BD					166	0.1	New
MLPD					66	<0.1	0.0
Informal votes		1,139			674		
Total valid votes		164,572			165,037		
Turnout		165,711	85.1	▲2.1			
Greens hold	Majority	3,046	1.8	▲1.6			

=== 2021 election ===
Federal election (2021): Hamburg-Eimsbüttel
Notes:	Blue background denotes the winner of the electorate vote. Pink background denotes a candidate elected from their party list. Yellow background denotes an electorate win by a list member, or other incumbent. A ✓ or ✗ denotes status of any incumbent, win or lose respectively.						
Party	Candidate	Votes	%	±%	Party votes	%	±%
Greens	Till Steffen	47,734	29.8	▲14.8	47,983	29.9	▲12.9
SPD	✗ Niels Annen	47,375	29.6	▼2.0	44,911	28.0	▲5.7
CDU	Rüdiger Kruse	27,462	17.2	▼11.5	23,843	14.9	▼12.1
FDP	Carolin Hümpel	12,957	8.1	▲1.3	18,190	11.3	▲0.1
Left	Żaklin Nastić	11,351	7.1	▼3.3	10,847	6.8	▼5.7
AfD	Marc Cremer-Thursby	5,450	3.4	▼2.3	5,662	3.5	▼2.4
dieBasis	Inke Meyer	2,400	1.5		1,895	1.2	
Tierschutzpartei					1,682	1.0	▲0.2
PARTEI	Martin Sommer	2,334	1.5		1,358	0.8	▼0.7
Volt	Sören Horn	1,391	0.9		906	0.6	
Team Todenhöfer					850	0.5	
FW	Alexander Feltz	998	0.6		761	0.5	▲0.3
Pirates					500	0.3	
ÖDP	Hannes Lincke	450	0.3	▼0.4	235	0.1	▼0.1
du.					188	0.1	
Humanists					149	0.1	
V-Partei3					139	0.1	▼0.1
DKP					100	0.1	0.0
NPD					53	0.0	▼0.1
MLPD	Uwe Wagner	137	0.1	▼0.1	47	0.0	▼0.1
Bündnis 21					42	0.0	
LKR					24	0.0	
Informal votes		931			605		
Total valid votes		160,039			160,365		
Turnout		160,970	83.0	▲2.0			
Greens gain from SPD	Majority	359	0.2				

=== 2017 election ===
Federal election (2017): Hamburg-Eimsbüttel
Notes:	Blue background denotes the winner of the electorate vote. Pink background denotes a candidate elected from their party list. Yellow background denotes an electorate win by a list member, or other incumbent. A ✓ or ✗ denotes status of any incumbent, win or lose respectively.						
Party	Candidate	Votes	%	±%	Party votes	%	±%
SPD	✓ Niels Annen	48,920	31.6	▼5.9	34,575	22.3	▼9.1
CDU	Rüdiger Kruse	44,416	28.7	▼4.6	41,826	26.9	▼4.1
Greens	Anna Gallina	23,220	15.0	▲2.0	26,372	17.0	▲1.4
Left	Żaklin Nastić	16,123	10.4	▲3.5	19,290	12.4	▲3.9
FDP	Ria Schröder	10,537	6.8	▲4.5	17,463	11.3	▲6.1
AfD	Herbert Wolf	8,777	5.7	▲2.8	9,138	5.9	▲2.2
PARTEI					2,427	1.6	▲0.9
Independent	Marco Scheffler	1,457	0.9				
Tierschutzpartei					1,262	0.8	
ÖDP	Benjamin Krohn	983	0.6		442	0.3	▲0.1
DiB					738	0.5	
BGE					605	0.4	
V-Partei³					336	0.2	
FW					327	0.2	▼0.1
MLPD	Mustafa Kurt	297	0.2		126	0.1	0.0
NPD					184	0.1	▼0.3
DKP					92	0.1	
Informal votes		1,283			810		
Total valid votes		154,730			155,203		
Turnout		156,013	81.1	▲5.7			
SPD hold	Majority	4,504	2.9	▼1.3			

=== 2013 election ===
Federal election (2013): Hamburg-Eimsbüttel
Notes:	Blue background denotes the winner of the electorate vote. Pink background denotes a candidate elected from their party list. Yellow background denotes an electorate win by a list member, or other incumbent. A ✓ or ✗ denotes status of any incumbent, win or lose respectively.						
Party	Candidate	Votes	%	±%	Party votes	%	±%
SPD	Niels Annen	53,105	37.5	▲13.7	44,492	31.4	▲4.6
CDU	✗ Rüdiger Kruse	47,112	33.3	▲2.1	43,989	31.1	▲4.2
Greens	Anna Gallina	18,399	13.0	▼13.0	22,074	15.6	▼2.7
Left	Kersten Artus	9,728	6.9	▼2.1	12,137	8.6	▼1.9
AfD	Günther Siegert	4,034	2.9		5,197	3.7	
Pirates	Anne Alter	3,352	2.4		3,751	2.6	▲0.1
FDP	Burkhardt Müller-Sönksen	3,264	2.3	▼6.1	9,138	5.9	▼8.3
Independent	Marco Scheffler	1,469	1.0				
PARTEI					870	0.6	
NPD	Wolfgang Möller	548	0.4	▼0.3	551	0.4	▼0.2
RENTNER					525	0.4	▼0.3
FW	Gregor Voht	427	0.3		397	0.3	
ÖDP					293	0.2	▼0.1
MLPD					56	0.0	0.0
Informal votes		1,646			1,444		
Total valid votes		141,438			141,640		
Turnout		143,084	75.4	▼0.8			
SPD gain from CDU	Majority	5,993	4.2				

=== 2009 election ===
Federal election (2009): Hamburg-Eimsbüttel
Notes:	Blue background denotes the winner of the electorate vote. Pink background denotes a candidate elected from their party list. Yellow background denotes an electorate win by a list member, or other incumbent. A ✓ or ✗ denotes status of any incumbent, win or lose respectively.						
Party	Candidate	Votes	%	±%	Party votes	%	±%
CDU	Rüdiger Kruse	43,714	31.2	▼2.5	37,695	26.8	▼0.6
Greens	Krista Sager	36,518	26.1	▲13.5	25,819	18.3	▲0.4
SPD	Danial Ilkhanipour	33,364	23.8	▼21.2	37,722	26.8	▼10.5
Left	Herbert Schulz	12,540	8.9	▲4.6	14,732	10.5	▲4.3
FDP	Burkhardt Müller-Sönksen	11,732	8.4	▲4.7	18,851	13.4	▲3.9
Pirates					3,531	2.5	
Independent	Marco Scheffler	1,295	0.9				
NPD	Thorsten Schuster	969	0.7	0.0	799	0.6	▼0.1
RENTNER					934	0.7	
ÖDP					428	0.3	
DVU					144	0.1	
MLPD					70	0.0	0.0
Informal votes		1,891			1,298		
Total valid votes		140,132			140,725		
Turnout		142,023	76.2	▼4.8			
CDU gain from SPD	Majority	7,196	5.1				

=== 2005 election ===
Federal election (2005):Hamburg-Eimsbüttel
Notes:	Blue background denotes the winner of the electorate vote. Pink background denotes a candidate elected from their party list. Yellow background denotes an electorate win by a list member, or other incumbent. A ✓ or ✗ denotes status of any incumbent, win or lose respectively.						
Party	Candidate	Votes	%	±%	Party votes	%	±%
SPD	Niels Annen	65,610	45.1	▼6.3	54,488	37.3	▼3.1
CDU	Wolfgang Beuß	49,039	33.7	▲3.7	40,058	27.4	▲1.5
Greens	Till Steffen	18,249	12.5	▲1.5	26,223	18.0	▼2.2
Left	Florian Wilde	6,366	4.4	▲2.6	8,977	6.1	▲3.8
FDP	Stephan Freiherr von Hundelshausen	5,297	3.6	▼1.9	13,841	9.5	▲2.3
NPD	Peter Schäfer-Hansen	1,068	0.7		910	0.6	▲0.5
Tierschutzpartei					936	0.6	
PARTEI					365	0.2	
APPD					165	0.1	
MLPD					54	0.0	
Informal votes		1,725			1,337		
Total valid votes		145,629			146,017		
Turnout		147,354	81.0	▼1.9			
SPD hold	Majority	16,571	11.4				
