= Tijen Ataoğlu =

German politician (born 1989)

- Ataoğlu in 2026

Member of the Bundestag
- Incumbent
- Assumed office 25 March 2025
- Preceded by: Timo Schisanowski
- Constituency: Hagen – Ennepe-Ruhr-Kreis I

Personal details
- Born: 21 July 1989 (age 37) Wipperfürth, West Germany (now Germany)
- Party: Christian Democratic Union (since 2013)
- Education: University of Cologne

Tijen Ataoğlu (born 21 July 1989) is a German lawyer and politician of the Christian Democratic Union (CDU) who was elected as a member of the Bundestag in 2025, representing the Hagen – Ennepe-Ruhr-Kreis I district.

== Early career ==
Before entering parliament, Ataoğlu worked as chief of staff to Thorsten Schick in his capacity as chair of the CDU group in the State Parliament of North Rhine-Westphalia.

== Political career ==
In parliament, Ataoğlu has been serving on the Committee for the Scrutiny of Elections, Immunity and the Rules of Procedure and the Committee on Legal Affairs and Consumer Protection.

In addition to her committee assignments, Ataoğlu has been a member of the German delegation to the Parliamentary Assembly of the Council of Europe (PACE) since 2025. In the Assembly, she serves on Committee on Legal Affairs and Human Rights.
