= Hagen – Ennepe-Ruhr-Kreis I =

Constituency for the elections to the 19th German Bundestag 2017

137 Hagen – Ennepe-Ruhr-Kreis I
- Electoral district for the Bundestag
- Hagen – Ennepe-Ruhr-Kreis I in 2025
- State: North Rhine-Westphalia
- Population: 287,000 (2019)
- Electorate: 201,594 (2021)
- Major settlements: Hagen; Gevelsberg; Ennepetal
- Area: 324.1 km^{2}

Current electoral district
- Created: 1949
- Party: CDU
- Member: Tijen Ataoğlu
- Elected: 2025

Hagen – Ennepe-Ruhr-Kreis I is an electoral constituency (German: Wahlkreis) represented in the Bundestag. It elects one member via first-past-the-post voting. Under the current constituency numbering system, it is designated as constituency 137. It is located in the Ruhr region of North Rhine-Westphalia, comprising the city of Hagen and the southern part of the Ennepe-Ruhr-Kreis district.

Hagen – Ennepe-Ruhr-Kreis I was created for the inaugural 1949 federal election. From 2021 to 2025, it has been represented by Timo Schisanowski of the Social Democratic Party (SPD). Since 2025 it has been represented by Tijen Ataoğlu of the CDU.

== Geography ==
Hagen – Ennepe-Ruhr-Kreis I is located in the Ruhr region of North Rhine-Westphalia. As of the 2021 federal election, it comprises the independent city of Hagen and the municipalities of Breckerfeld, Ennepetal, Gevelsberg, and Schwelm from the Ennepe-Ruhr-Kreis district.

== History ==
Hagen – Ennepe-Ruhr-Kreis I was created in 1949, then known as Hagen. It acquired its current name in the 2002 election. In the 1949 election, it was North Rhine-Westphalia constituency 53 in the numbering system. From 1953 through 1961, it was number 114. From 1965 through 1976, it was number 113. From 1980 through 1998, it was number 108. From 2002 through 2009, it was number 139. In the 2013 through 2021 elections, it was number 138. From the 2025 election, it has been number 137.

Originally, the constituency was coterminous with the city of Hagen. It acquired its current borders in the 2002 election.

Election	No.	Name	Borders
1949	53	Hagen	Hagen city
1953	114	Hagen	Hagen city
1957	114	Hagen	Hagen city
1961	114	Hagen	Hagen city
1965	113	Hagen	Hagen city
1969	113	Hagen	Hagen city
1972	113	Hagen	Hagen city
1976	113	Hagen	Hagen city
1980	108	Hagen	Hagen city
1983	108	Hagen	Hagen city
1987	108	Hagen	Hagen city
1990	108	Hagen	Hagen city
1994	108	Hagen	Hagen city
1998	108	Hagen	Hagen city
2002	139	Hagen – Ennepe-Ruhr-Kreis I	Hagen city; Ennepe-Ruhr-Kreis district (only Breckerfeld, Gevelsberg, Schwelm, and Ennepetal municipalities)
2005	139	Hagen – Ennepe-Ruhr-Kreis I	Hagen city; Ennepe-Ruhr-Kreis district (only Breckerfeld, Gevelsberg, Schwelm, and Ennepetal municipalities)
2009	139	Hagen – Ennepe-Ruhr-Kreis I	Hagen city; Ennepe-Ruhr-Kreis district (only Breckerfeld, Gevelsberg, Schwelm, and Ennepetal municipalities)
2013	138	Hagen – Ennepe-Ruhr-Kreis I	Hagen city; Ennepe-Ruhr-Kreis district (only Breckerfeld, Gevelsberg, Schwelm, and Ennepetal municipalities)
2017	138	Hagen – Ennepe-Ruhr-Kreis I	Hagen city; Ennepe-Ruhr-Kreis district (only Breckerfeld, Gevelsberg, Schwelm, and Ennepetal municipalities)
2021	138	Hagen – Ennepe-Ruhr-Kreis I	Hagen city; Ennepe-Ruhr-Kreis district (only Breckerfeld, Gevelsberg, Schwelm, and Ennepetal municipalities)
2025	137	Hagen – Ennepe-Ruhr-Kreis I	Hagen city; Ennepe-Ruhr-Kreis district (only Breckerfeld, Gevelsberg, Schwelm, and Ennepetal municipalities)

== Members ==
The constituency has been held by the Social Democratic Party (SPD) during all but three Bundestag terms since its creation. It was first represented by Luise Rehling of the Christian Democratic Union (CDU) from 1949 to 1961. Fritz Steinhoff of the SPD was elected in 1961 and served until 1969, followed by Lothar Wrede until 1983. Hans-Günther Toetemeyer was then representative from 1983 to 1994. Dietmar Thieser served a single term from 1994 to 1998. René Röspel was elected in 1998, and re-elected in 2002, 2005, 2009, 2013, and 2017. He was succeeded by Timo Schisanowski in 2021. In 2025, after 64 years of SPD representation, Tijen Ataoğlu of the CDU was elected.

Election	Member	Party	%
1949	Luise Rehling	CDU	32.4
1953	Luise Rehling	CDU	48.2
1957	Luise Rehling	CDU	47.0
1961	Fritz Steinhoff	SPD	46.0
1965	Fritz Steinhoff	SPD	52.1
1969	Lothar Wrede	SPD	52.2
1972	Lothar Wrede	SPD	50.3
1976	Lothar Wrede	SPD	47.7
1980	Lothar Wrede	SPD	52.2
1983	Hans-Günther Toetemeyer	SPD	48.7
1987	Hans-Günther Toetemeyer	SPD	49.3
1990	Hans-Günther Toetemeyer	SPD	46.8
1994	Dietmar Thieser	SPD	51.8
1998	René Röspel	SPD	55.9
2002	René Röspel	SPD	55.2
2005	René Röspel	SPD	52.3
2009	René Röspel	SPD	43.0
2013	René Röspel	SPD	47.1
2017	René Röspel	SPD	39.2
2021	Timo Schisanowski	SPD	33.3
2025	Tijen Ataoğlu	CDU	28.9

== Election results ==
=== 2025 election ===
Federal election (2025): Hagen – Ennepe-Ruhr-Kreis I
Notes:	Blue background denotes the winner of the electorate vote. Pink background denotes a candidate elected from their party list. Yellow background denotes an electorate win by a list member, or other incumbent. A ✓ or ✗ denotes status of any incumbent, win or lose respectively.						
Party	Candidate	Votes	%	±%	Party votes	%	±%
CDU	Tijen Ataoğlu	44,053	28.9	▲2.6	43,380	28.4	▲4.6
SPD	✗ Timo Schisanowski	39,055	25.6	▼7.6	32,724	21.4	▼11.6
AfD	Michael Eiche	32,562	21.4	▲11.3	31,913	20.9	▲11.3
Greens	Janosch Dahmen	12,544	8.2	▼4.3	13,448	8.8	▼3.2
Left	Jürgen Senge	9,025	5.9	▲2.7	11,933	7.8	▲4.4
BSW	Andreas Kroll	6,481	4.3		7,316	4.8	
FDP	Katrin Helling-Plahr	5,190	3.4	▼6.0	5,897	3.9	▼7.4
Tierschutzpartei					2,363	1.5	▼0.1
FW	Karen Buchholz	1,1780	1.2	▼0.3	779	0.5	▼0.2
Team Todenhöfer	Ali Bülbül	1,425	0.9		631	0.4	▼0.6
PARTEI				▼2.0	804	0.5	▼0.6
Volt					672	0.4	▲0.3
dieBasis				▼1.0	302	0.2	▼0.6
PdF					233	0.2	▲0.1
MLPD	Reinhard Funk	231	0.2	0.0	89	0.1	0.0
BD					225	0.1	
Values					105	0.1	
MERA25					55	0.0	
Pirates							▼0.4
Gesundheitsforschung							▼0.1
Bündnis C							▼0.1
Humanists							▼0.1
ÖDP							▼0.1
SGP						0.0	0.0
Informal votes		1,523			1,000		
Total valid votes		152,346			152,869		
Turnout		153,869	78.5	▲6.7			
SPD hold	Majority	4,998	3.3				

=== 2021 election ===
Federal election (2021): Hagen – Ennepe-Ruhr-Kreis I
Notes:	Blue background denotes the winner of the electorate vote. Pink background denotes a candidate elected from their party list. Yellow background denotes an electorate win by a list member, or other incumbent. A ✓ or ✗ denotes status of any incumbent, win or lose respectively.						
Party	Candidate	Votes	%	±%	Party votes	%	±%
SPD	Timo Schisanowski	47,581	33.3	▼6.0	47,400	33.0	▲3.7
CDU	Christian Nienhaus	37,718	26.4	▼3.9	34,210	23.8	▼5.1
Greens	Janosch Dahmen	17,954	12.5	▲8.7	17,237	12.0	▲6.2
AfD	Andreas Geitz	14,419	10.1	▼1.2	13,760	9.6	▼2.3
FDP	Katrin Helling-Plahr	13,531	9.4	▲1.5	16,179	11.3	▼1.3
Left	Ingo Hentschel	4,552	3.2	▼2.2	4,857	3.4	▼3.8
Tierschutzpartei					2,392	1.7	▲0.6
PARTEI	Athanasios Sarakatsanos	2,830	2.0		1,591	1.1	▲0.3
Team Todenhöfer					1,448	1.0	
FW	Sara Buschner	2,122	1.5		1,031	0.7	▲0.4
dieBasis	Markus Effenberger	1,399	1.0		1,200	0.8	
Independent	Michael Tropp	809	0.6				
Pirates					573	0.4	▼0.1
Volt					235	0.2	
LIEBE					235	0.2	
Gesundheitsforschung					194	0.1	0.0
Bündnis C					169	0.1	
NPD					161	0.1	▼0.2
LfK					162	0.1	
Humanists					110	0.1	0.0
ÖDP					99	0.1	0.0
V-Partei3					91	0.1	0.0
MLPD	Reinhard Funk	185	0.1	▼0.1	76	0.1	▼0.1
du.					57	0.0	
PdF					56	0.0	
DKP					45	0.0	0.0
LKR					32	0.0	
SGP					9	0.0	0.0
Informal votes		1,651			1,142		
Total valid votes		143,100			143,609		
Turnout		144,751	71.8	▼0.5			
SPD hold	Majority	9,863	6.9	▼2.1			

=== 2017 election ===
Federal election (2017): Hagen – Ennepe-Ruhr-Kreis I
Notes:	Blue background denotes the winner of the electorate vote. Pink background denotes a candidate elected from their party list. Yellow background denotes an electorate win by a list member, or other incumbent. A ✓ or ✗ denotes status of any incumbent, win or lose respectively.						
Party	Candidate	Votes	%	±%	Party votes	%	±%
SPD	✓ René Röspel	58,206	39.2	▼7.8	43,548	29.3	▼7.4
CDU	Cemile Giousouf	44,948	30.3	▼3.8	42,972	28.9	▼6.4
AfD	Michael Eiche	16,716	11.3		17,622	11.8	▲7.5
FDP	Katrin Helling-Plahr	11,727	7.9	▲4.5	18,722	12.6	▲8.0
Left	Ralf Sondermeyer	8,045	5.4	▼0.2	10,743	7.2	▲0.5
Greens	Karen Haltaufderheide	5,752	3.9	▼0.6	8,673	5.8	▼0.9
Independent	Michael Tropp	2,627	1.8				
Tierschutzpartei					1,533	1.0	
PARTEI					1,202	0.8	▲0.4
AD-DEMOKRATEN					824	0.6	
Pirates					683	0.5	▼1.8
NPD					457	0.3	▼0.8
FW					410	0.3	0.0
Volksabstimmung					182	0.1	▼0.1
Gesundheitsforschung					177	0.1	
MLPD	Reinhard Funk	278	0.2	0.0	174	0.1	▲0.1
ÖDP					154	0.1	0.0
DM					153	0.1	
V-Partei³					149	0.1	
DiB					136	0.1	
BGE					120	0.1	
Die Humanisten					104	0.1	
DKP					41	0.0	
SGP					15	0.0	0.0
Informal votes		1,745			1,250		
Total valid votes		148,299			148,794		
Turnout		150,044	72.4	▲3.2			
SPD hold	Majority	13,258	8.9	▼4.1			

=== 2013 election ===
Federal election (2013): Hagen – Ennepe-Ruhr-Kreis I
Notes:	Blue background denotes the winner of the electorate vote. Pink background denotes a candidate elected from their party list. Yellow background denotes an electorate win by a list member, or other incumbent. A ✓ or ✗ denotes status of any incumbent, win or lose respectively.						
Party	Candidate	Votes	%	±%	Party votes	%	±%
SPD	✓ René Röspel	68,044	47.1	▲4.1	53,380	36.7	▲3.8
CDU	Cemile Giousouf	49,329	34.1	▲0.6	51,328	35.3	▲5.0
Left	Thomas Schock	8,181	5.7	▼2.5	9,820	6.8	▼2.9
Greens	Frank Steinwender	6,521	4.5	▼1.4	9,806	6.7	▼2.4
FDP	Katrin Helling-Plahr	4,978	3.4	▼4.1	6,604	4.5	▼7.7
AfD					6,374	4.4	
Pirates	Maja Tiegs	3,931	2.7		3,262	2.2	▲0.6
NPD	Udo Franke	2,822	2.0	▲0.2	1,611	1.1	▼0.1
PRO					744	0.5	
PARTEI					566	0.4	
FW					373	0.3	
REP					310	0.2	▼0.4
Volksabstimmung					305	0.2	▲0.1
RRP	Brigitte Schiltz	514	0.4		189	0.1	▼0.1
Nichtwahler					182	0.1	
ÖDP					159	0.1	▲0.1
BIG					142	0.1	
Party of Reason					113	0.1	
MLPD	Reinhard Funk	268	0.2		96	0.1	0.0
PSG					33	0.0	0.0
Die Rechte					29	0.0	
BüSo					20	0.0	0.0
Informal votes		2,595			1,737		
Total valid votes		144,588			145,446		
Turnout		147,183	69.1	▼0.1			
SPD hold	Majority	18,715	13.0	▲3.5			

=== 2009 election ===
Federal election (2009): Hagen – Ennepe-Ruhr-Kreis I
Notes:	Blue background denotes the winner of the electorate vote. Pink background denotes a candidate elected from their party list. Yellow background denotes an electorate win by a list member, or other incumbent. A ✓ or ✗ denotes status of any incumbent, win or lose respectively.						
Party	Candidate	Votes	%	±%	Party votes	%	±%
SPD	✓ René Röspel	63,980	43.0	▼9.3	49,061	32.9	▼12.9
CDU	Carmen Knollmann	49,893	33.5	▼1.2	45,225	30.3	▲0.5
Left	Thomas Friedrich Schock	12,188	8.2	▲4.1	14,448	9.7	▲3.9
FDP	Katrin Helling	11,251	7.6	▲4.0	18,246	12.2	▲3.7
Greens	Karen Haltaufderheide	8,836	5.9	▲3.1	13,557	9.1	▲2.7
Pirates					2,407	1.6	
NPD	Thorsten Crämer	2,679	1.8	▲0.5	1,774	1.2	▲0.2
Tierschutzpartei					1,231	0.8	0.0
REP					937	0.6	▲0.1
RENTNER					706	0.5	
FAMILIE					673	0.5	▲0.1
RRP					278	0.2	
Volksabstimmung					137	0.1	0.0
DVU					96	0.1	
MLPD					87	0.1	0.0
ÖDP					79	0.1	
Centre					72	0.0	0.0
BüSo					36	0.0	0.0
PSG					12	0.0	0.0
Informal votes		1,885			1,650		
Total valid votes		148,827			149,062		
Turnout		150,712	69.2	▼7.4			
SPD hold	Majority	14,087	9.5	▼8.3			

=== 2005 election ===
Federal election (2005): Hagen – Ennepe-Ruhr-Kreis I
Notes:	Blue background denotes the winner of the electorate vote. Pink background denotes a candidate elected from their party list. Yellow background denotes an electorate win by a list member, or other incumbent. A ✓ or ✗ denotes status of any incumbent, win or lose respectively.						
Party	Candidate	Votes	%	±%	Party votes	%	±%
SPD	✓ René Röspel	87,664	52.3	▼2.9	76,987	45.8	▼3.1
CDU	Wolfgang Röspel	58,191	34.7	▲1.9	50,197	2939	▼1.1
Left	Ralf Sondermeyer	6,837	4.1	▲3.1	9,701	5.8	▲4.6
FDP	Lisbeth Buschkühl	5,944	3.5	▼2.5	14,381	8.6	▼0.3
Greens	Jörg Obereiner	4,757	2.8	▼0.6	10,802	6.4	▼0.9
NPD	Wolfgang Mond	2,129	1.3		1,687	1.0	▲0.7
Tierschutzpartei	Michael Möllmann	1,988	1.2		1,414	0.8	▲0.4
REP					903	0.5	0.0
Familie					650	0.4	▲0.2
GRAUEN					552	0.3	▲0.1
PBC					284	0.2	
MLPD	Renate Höhne	188	0.1		152	0.1	
From Now on... Democracy Through Referendum					147	0.1	
Socialist Equality Party					70	0.0	
Centre					46	0.0	
BüSo					31	0.0	0.0
Informal votes		2,524			2,218		
Total valid votes		167,698			168,004		
Turnout		170,222	76.6	▼0.9			
SPD hold	Majority	29,473	17.6				
