= René Röspel =

German politician

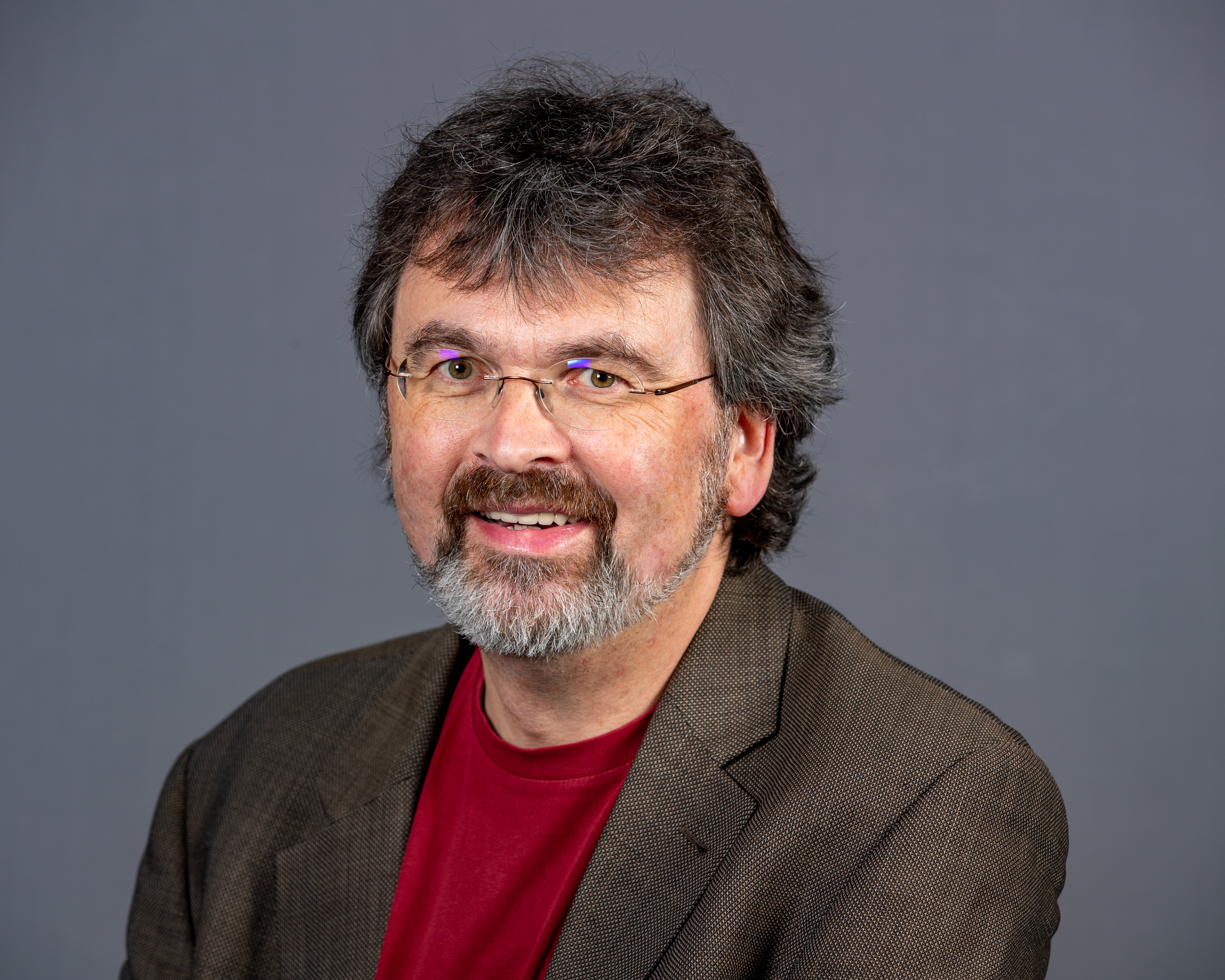
- René Röspel in 2014

Member of the Bundestag for Hagen – Ennepe-Ruhr-Kreis I (Hagen; 1998–2002)
- In office 26 October 1998 – 2021
- Preceded by: Dietmar Thieser
- Succeeded by: Timo Schisanowski

Personal details
- Born: 9 July 1964 (age 62) Hagen, West Germany (now Germany)
- Party: SPD
- Children: 4
- Education: Ruhr University Bochum

René Röspel (born 9 July 1964) is a German biologist and politician of the Social Democratic Party (SPD) who served as a member of the Bundestag from the state of North Rhine-Westphalia from 1998 to 2021.

== Political career ==
Röspel first became a member of the Bundestag in the 1998 German federal election. Throughout his time in parliament, he served on the Committee for Education, Research and Technology Assessment. In this capacity, he is his parliamentary group's rapporteur on health research. From 1998 until 2005, he was also a member of the Committee on the Environment, Nature Conservation and Nuclear Safety.

In addition to his committee assignments, Röspel was part of the German Parliamentary Friendship Group with the Baltic States.

In the negotiations to form a Grand Coalition of Chancellor Angela Merkel's Christian Democrats (CDU together with the Bavarian CSU) and the SPD following the 2013 federal elections, Röspel was part of the SPD delegation in the working group on education and research policy, led by Johanna Wanka and Doris Ahnen.

== Other activities ==
- Max Planck Institute for Chemical Energy Conversion, Member of the Board of Trustees
- Max Planck Institute of Molecular Physiology, Member of the Board of Trustees
- University of Hagen, Member of the Parliamentary Advisory Board
- Gegen Vergessen – Für Demokratie, Member
- Helmholtz Association of German Research Centres, Member of the Senate (2006–2021)
- German European Security Association (GESA), Member of the Political Advisory Board (2013-2017)
- Center of Advanced European Studies and Research (CAESAR), Member of the Foundation Board (2002-2007)

== Personal life ==
In Berlin, Raspel shared an apartment with Willi Brase.
