= Till Steffen =

German politician (born 1973)

Till Steffen MdB
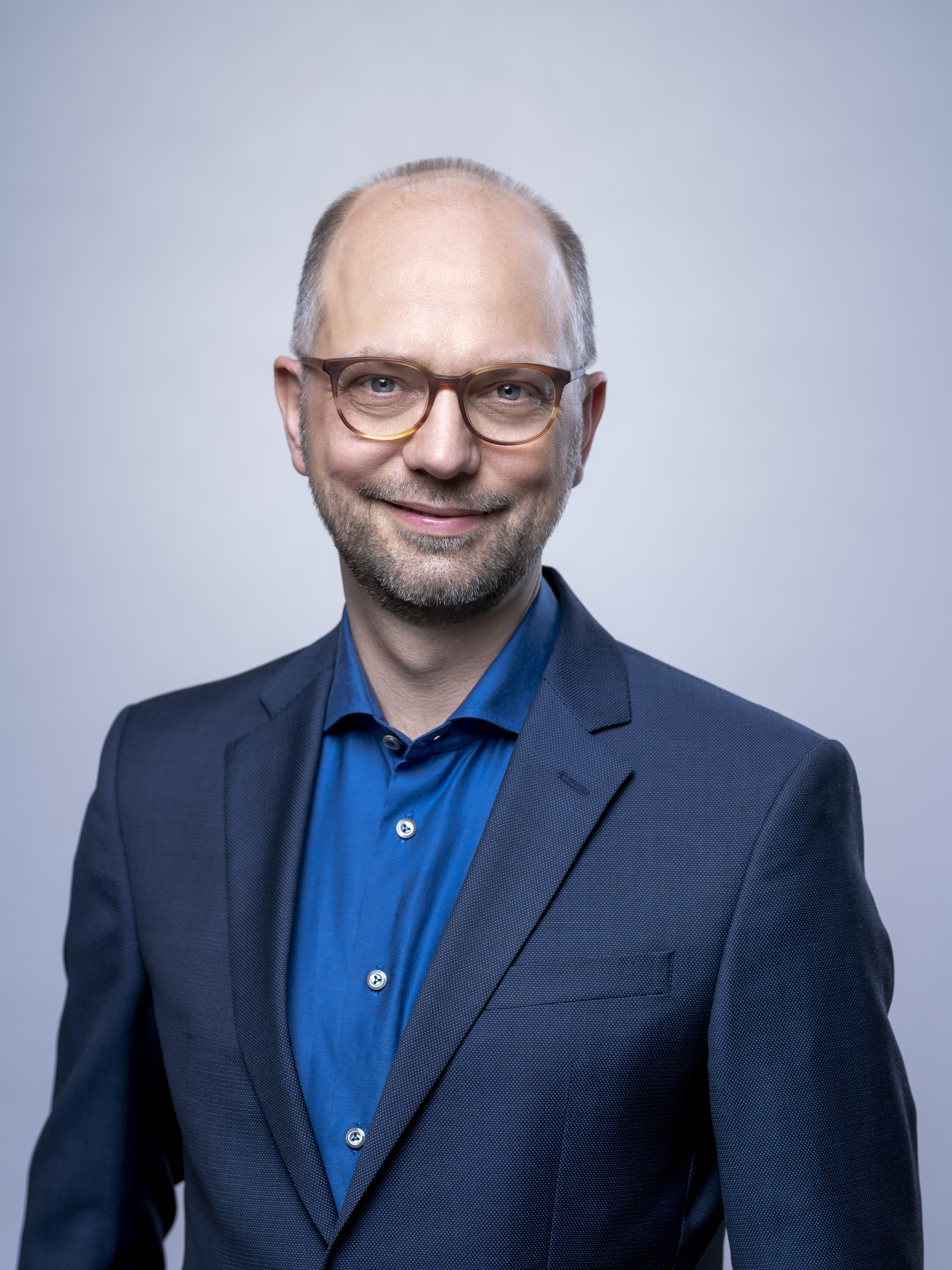
- Steffen in 2020

Member of the Bundestag; for Hamburg-Eimsbüttel
- Incumbent
- Assumed office 26 October 2021
- Preceded by: Niels Annen

Senator for Justice of Hamburg
- In office 15 April 2015 – 10 June 2020
- President: Olaf Scholz; Peter Tschentscher
- Preceded by: Jana Schiedek
- Succeeded by: Anna Gallina
- In office 7 May 2008 – 30 November 2010
- President: Ole von Beust; Christoph Ahlhaus
- Preceded by: Carsten-Ludwig Lüdemann
- Succeeded by: Heino Vahldieck

Member of the Hamburg Parliament
- In office 10 June 2020 – 20 October 2021
- Preceded by: Eva-Maria Botzenhart
- Succeeded by: Sonja Lattwesen
- Constituency: State list
- In office 30 November 2010 – 15 April 2015
- Preceded by: Jenny Weggen
- Succeeded by: Mareike Engels
- Constituency: Rotherbaum – Harvestehude – Eimsbüttel-Ost
- In office 17 March 2004 – 7 May 2008
- Preceded by: Multi-member district
- Succeeded by: Jenny Weggen
- Constituency: State list (2004–2008); Rotherbaum – Harvestehude – Eimsbüttel-Ost (2008)

Personal details
- Born: Till Benjamin Steffen; 22 July 1973 (age 53) Wiesbaden, West Germany
- Party: Alliance 90/The Greens
- Spouse: Heike Opitz (m. 2006)
- Children: 2
- Education: University of Mainz; University of Hamburg; University of Aberdeen

Till Steffen (born 22 July 1973) is a German lawyer and politician of Alliance 90/The Greens who has been serving as a member of the German Bundestag since the 2021 elections, representing the Hamburg-Eimsbüttel district.

From 2015 until 2020, Steffen served as Senator of Justice of the city state of Hamburg in the Senate Scholz II and again in the Senate Tschentscher. Already from 2008 to 2010 he held this office in the Senate von Beust III and Senate Ahlhaus.

== Early life and career ==
Till Steffen was born in Wiesbaden. He studied law at the universities of Mainz, Hamburg, and Aberdeen. He obtained his doctorate in the field of European nature conservation law. In 1997 he came to Hamburg and worked as a lawyer with a focus on administrative law first in the law firm von Harten and since 2008 as a partner in the law firm elblaw Rechtsanwälte.

== Political career ==
=== Career in state politics ===
Steffen has been a member of the Greens since 1990. Prior to his time in Hamburg, he worked from 1993 to 1997 as a city councilor in Wiesbaden. In 1994, he co-founded the Green Youth and was a member of the first federal executive. From 1999 to 2000 he was a member of the regional executive committee of the GAL Hamburg, the Hamburg section of Alliance 90/The Greens. Between 2001 and 2004 he was a group chairman of the GAL in the Eimsbüttel district meeting.

From 17 March 2004 Steffen was a member of the Hamburgische Bürgerschaft. In the 18th electoral term he was a member of the Committee on Internal Affairs, the Legal Committee, the Constitutional Committee and the Special Committee on Administrative Reform. In addition, he was in the supervisory committee "constitutional protection" and the parliamentary committee of inquiry "information dissemination".

As one of the state's representatives at the Bundesrat, Steffen was a member of the Committee on Legal Affairs from 2015 until 2020.

=== Member of the German Parliament (2021–present) ===
In 2020, Steffen announced his intention to run for a seat in the German Parliament in the 2021 German federal election.

In parliament, Steffen has since been serving on the Committee on Legal Affairs and the Committee on the Scrutiny of Elections, Immunity and the Rules of Procedure. Since 2022, he has also been serving on the parliamentary body in charge of appointing judges to the Highest Courts of Justice, namely the Federal Court of Justice (BGH), the Federal Administrative Court (BVerwG), the Federal Fiscal Court (BFH), the Federal Labour Court (BAG), and the Federal Social Court (BSG). From 2022 to 2023, he was part of the Commission for the Reform of the Electoral Law and the Modernization of Parliamentary Work, co-chaired by Johannes Fechner and Nina Warken.

In addition to his committee assignments, Steffen has been a member of the German delegation to the Franco-German Parliamentary Assembly since 2022.

After the 2025 German federal election, Steffen unsuccessfully challenged Konstantin von Notz in an internal vote on the role of deputy chair of the Green Party's parliamentary group.

== Other activities ==
- Stiftung Forum Recht, Member of the Board of Trustees (since 2022)

== Political positions ==
Amid the COVID-19 pandemic in Germany, Steffen joined forces with six other parliamentarians – Dirk Wiese, Heike Baehrens, Dagmar Schmidt, Janosch Dahmen, Katrin Helling-Plahr and Marie-Agnes Strack-Zimmermann – on a cross-party initiative in 2022 to support legislation that would have required all adults to be vaccinated.

Together with Marco Wanderwitz, Carmen Wegge and Martina Renner, Steffen was one of the initiators of a 2024 cross-party initiative to request that the Federal Constitutional Court issue a ban of the far-right Alternative for Germany party.
