= Heike Baehrens =

German politician

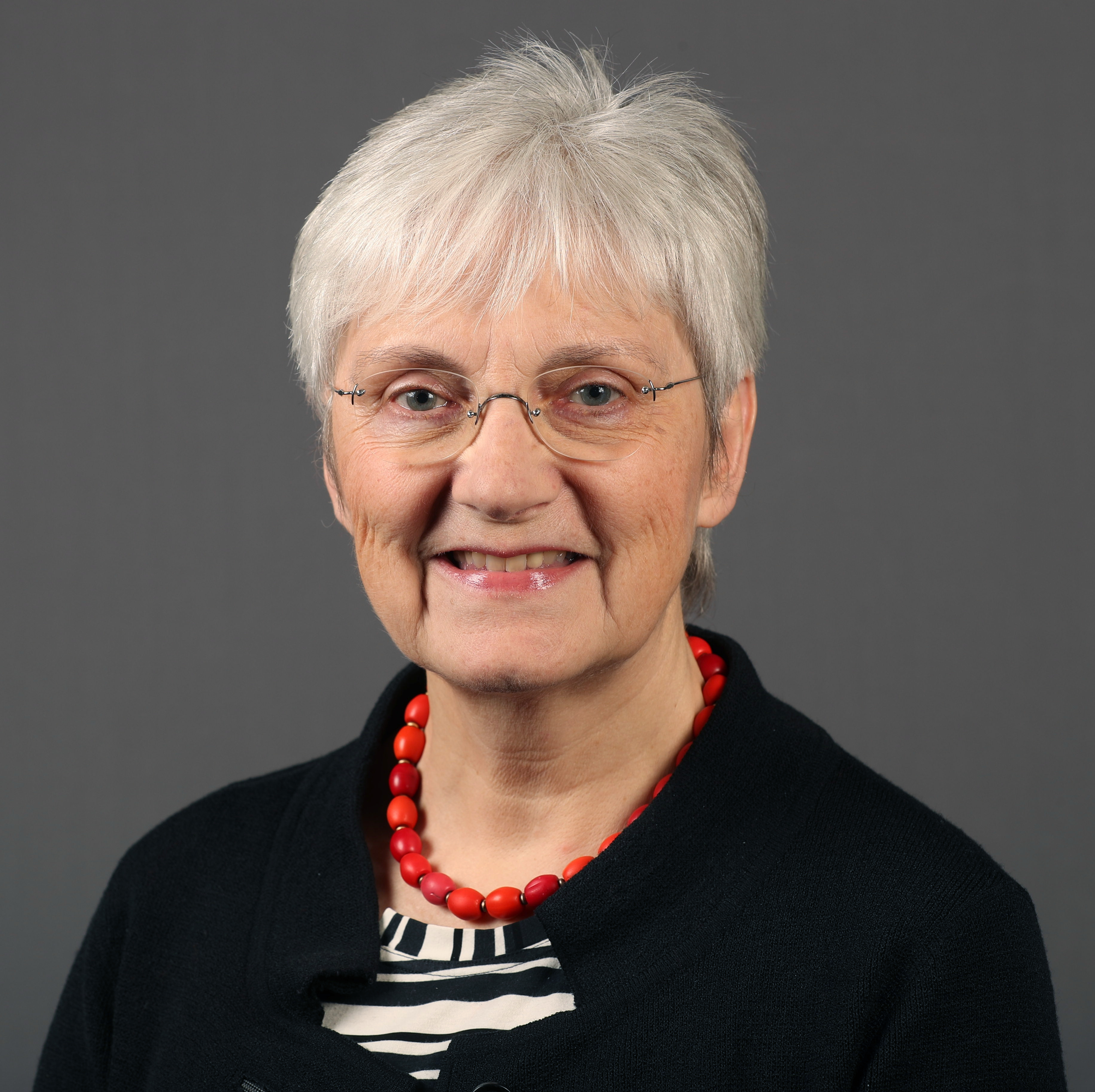

Member of the Bundestag
- In office 2013–2025

Personal details
- Born: 21 September 1955 (age 71) Bevern, Lower Saxony, West Germany (now Germany)
- Citizenship: German
- Party: SPD
- Children: 2

Heike Baehrens (born 21 September 1955) is a German deaconess, religious educator and politician of the Social Democratic Party (SPD) who served as a member of the German Bundestag from 2013 to 2025.

== Early life and career ==
After training as a bank clerk, Baehrens studied religious education. She worked as a deaconess in various church fields from 1977 to 1985. From 1996 to 2013 she has been managing director of the Diakonisches Werk Württemberg, and from 2002 to 2013 a member of the full-time board of directors of social policy fields and deputy chairman of the board. As a church councilor, she was a deputy to Dieter Kaufmann in the college of the Upper Church Council of the Evangelical-Lutheran Church in Württemberg.

== Political career ==
=== Career in local politics ===
Baehrens joined the SPD in 1988. From 1989 to 1996 she was a member of the Stuttgart municipal council. There she was first youth and social policy spokeswoman for the SPD group. From 1992 to 1996 she was deputy chairman of the SPD group in the Stuttgart municipal council.

=== Member of Parliament, 2013–2025 ===
In the 2013 federal elections, Baehrens moved to the German Bundestag via the SPD state list Baden-Württemberg for the Bundestag constituency Göppingen. In parliament, she was a member of the Committee on Health, where she was her parliamentary group's rapporteur on inclusion and European affairs. From 2018 to 2021, she also served as chairwoman of its Sub-Committee on Global Health.

In addition to her committee assignments, Baehrens served as Deputy Chairwoman of the German-Korean Parliamentary Group as well as Deputy Speaker of the Baden-Württemberg State Group of the SPD parliamentary group. She was a member of the non-partisan Europa-Union Deutschland, which is committed to a federal Europe and a far-reaching European unification process.

From the 2021 elections, Baehrens served as her parliamentary group's spokesperson for health. Amid the COVID-19 pandemic in Germany, she joined forces with six other parliamentarians – Dirk Wiese, Dagmar Schmidt, Janosch Dahmen, Till Steffen, Katrin Helling-Plahr and Marie-Agnes Strack-Zimmermann – on a cross-party initiative in 2022 to support legislation that would have required all adults to be vaccinated.

In April 2024, Baehrens announced that she would not stand in the 2025 federal elections but instead resign from active politics by the end of the parliamentary term.

== Other activities ==
- German Network against Neglected Tropical Diseases (DNTDs), Member of the Parliamentary Advisory Board (2018–2025)
- Berliner Republik, Member of the Editorial Board
- Evangelical Church in Germany (EKD), Member of the Committee on the Social Order
- VfB Stuttgart, Member

== Personal life ==
Baehrens has been married since 1977 and has two adult daughters and three grandchildren.
