= Janosch Dahmen =

German politician (born 1981)

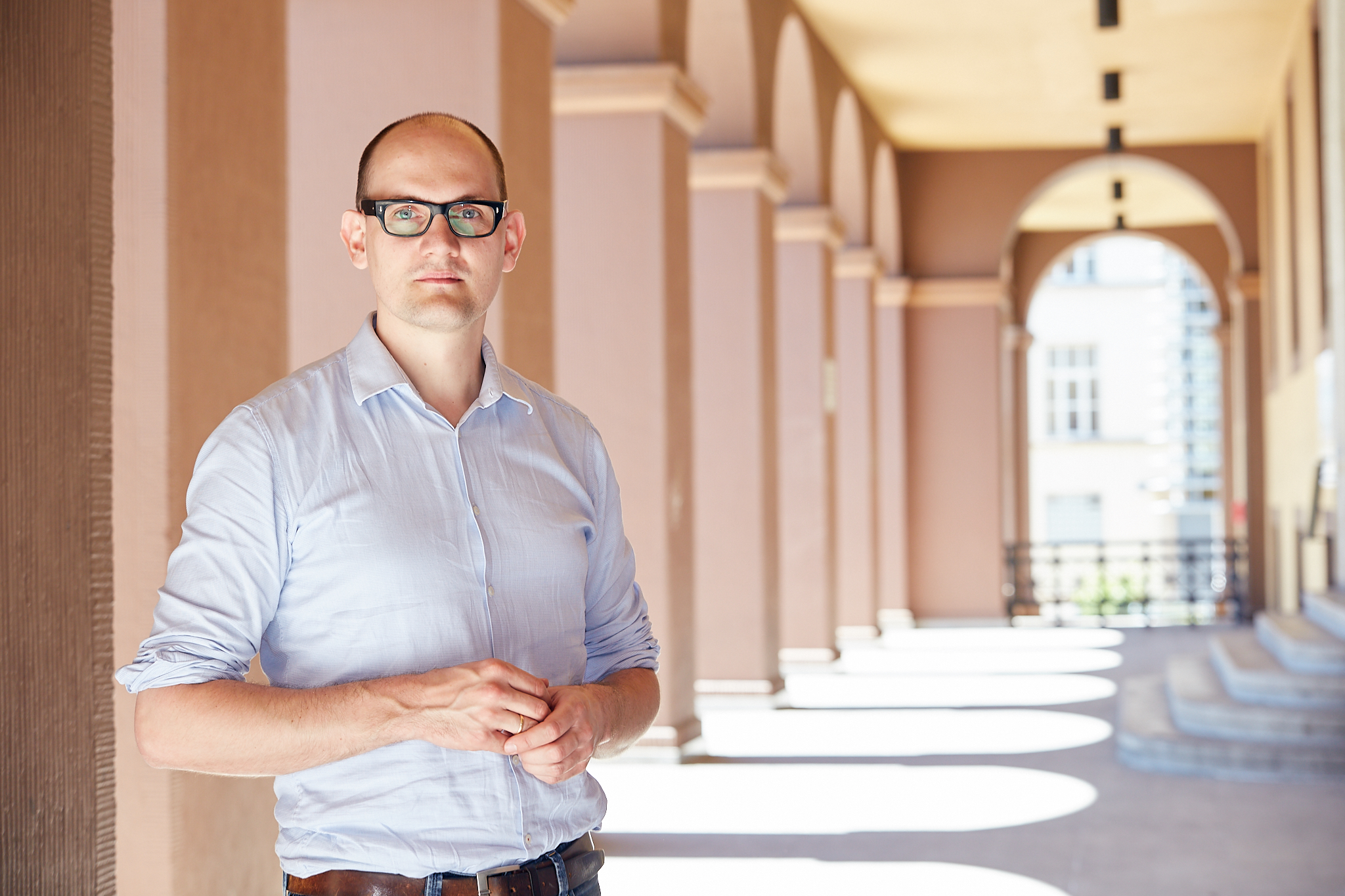
- Dahmen in 2020

Member of the Bundestag
- Incumbent
- Assumed office 12 November 2020

Personal details
- Born: 6 September 1981 (age 44) Berlin, West Germany (now Germany)
- Party: Greens
- Education: Witten/Herdecke University; American University of Beirut; University of California, San Diego

Janosch Dahmen (born 6 September 1981) is a German physician and politician of Alliance 90/The Greens who has been serving as a member of the Bundestag since 2020, representing the Hagen – Ennepe-Ruhr-Kreis I district.

== Early life and education ==
Born in Berlin, Dahmen first studied political science at University of Innsbruck for a year before moving to medicine.

From 2018 until 2020, Dahmen worked as medical director of the Berlin Fire Brigade.

== Political career ==
Dahmen joined Alliance 90/The Greens in 1998. From 2010 until 2018, he was part of the party's leadership in North Rhine-Westphalia, under co-chairs Sven Lehmann and Mona Neubaur.

Dahmen became a member of the Bundestag in 2020 when he replaced Katja Dörner who had resigned. In parliament, he has since been serving on the Committee on Health. Since 2021 he has been his parliamentary group's spokesperson on health policy. He is also the group's rapporteur on digital health.

In the negotiations to form a so-called traffic light coalition of the Social Democratic Party (SPD), the Green Party and the Free Democratic Party (FDP) following the 2021 German elections, Dahmen was part of his party's delegation in the working group on health, co-chaired by Katja Pähle, Maria Klein-Schmeink and Christine Aschenberg-Dugnus.

== Other activities ==
- Witten/Herdecke University, Member of the Supervisory Board
- German Interdisciplinary Association for Intensive and Emergency Medicine (DIVI), Member

== Political positions ==
Amid the COVID-19 pandemic in Germany, Dahmen joined forces with six other parliamentarians – Dirk Wiese, Heike Baehrens, Dagmar Schmidt, Till Steffen, Katrin Helling-Plahr and Marie-Agnes Strack-Zimmermann – on a cross-party initiative in 2022 to support legislation that would have required all adults to be vaccinated.

== Personal life ==
Dahmen is married and has three children. The family lives in Berlin's Kreuzberg district.
