= Peter Paterna =

German politician (1937–2018)

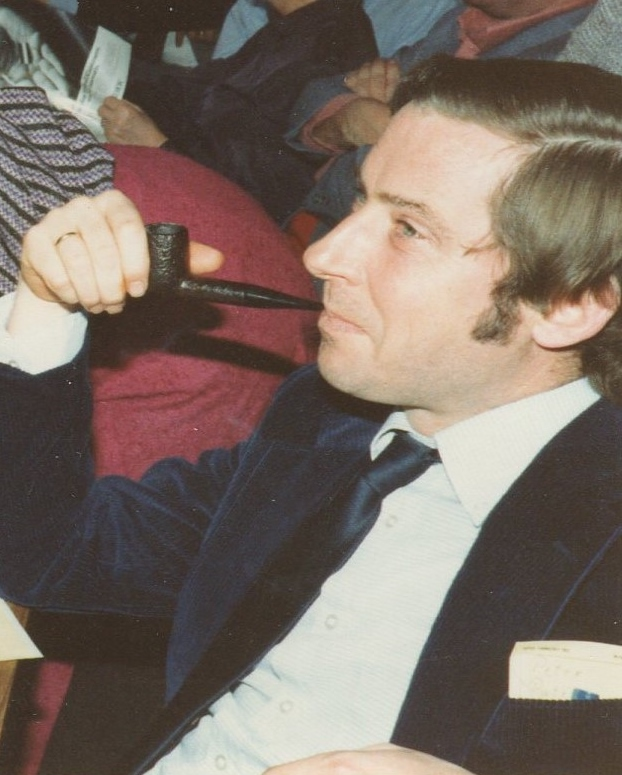
- Peter Paterna in 1981

Member of the Bundestag
- In office 14 December 1976 – 10 November 1994
- Preceded by: Claus Arndt
- Succeeded by: Angelika Mertens
- Constituency: Eimsbüttel (1976–1980); Hamburg-Eimsbüttel (1980–1994)

Personal details
- Born: 22 December 1937 Cuxhaven, Germany
- Died: 30 October 2018 (aged 80) Hamburg, Germany
- Resting place: Old Niendorf Cemetery
- Party: Social Democratic

Peter Paterna (22 December 1937 – 30 October 2018) was a German politician of the Social Democratic Party of Germany (SPD).

== Early life ==
Paterna studied to become a teacher in Innsbruck and Hamburg. He began teaching in 1963, most recently as deputy head teacher at the elementary and secondary school in Hamburg-Niendorf Sachsenweg. As a proponent of comprehensive education, he played a significant role in the establishment of the Julius-Leber-School in Hamburg-Schnelsen.

== Political career ==
In 1970, Paterna was elected to the Hamburg-Eimsbüttel district assembly, where he served as chairman of the SPD parliamentary group. Paterna joined the (SPD) in 1962. From 1976 to 1994, he was a member of the German Bundestag, always directly elected in the Eimsbüttel constituency (later Hamburg-Eimsbüttel).

In the Bundestag, he chaired the Committee on Post and Telecommunications (from 1989: Committee on Post and Telecommunications) from 1987 to 1994. His skepticism regarding the usefulness of data transmission via email remains well-known: after all, he argued, "we already have a functioning express courier system". Here he fought with all his might against the privatization of the postal service (Postreform) and the opening of public service media to private providers. In 1994, Paterna left the Bundestag after 18 years.

Paterna died in 2018 aged 80.

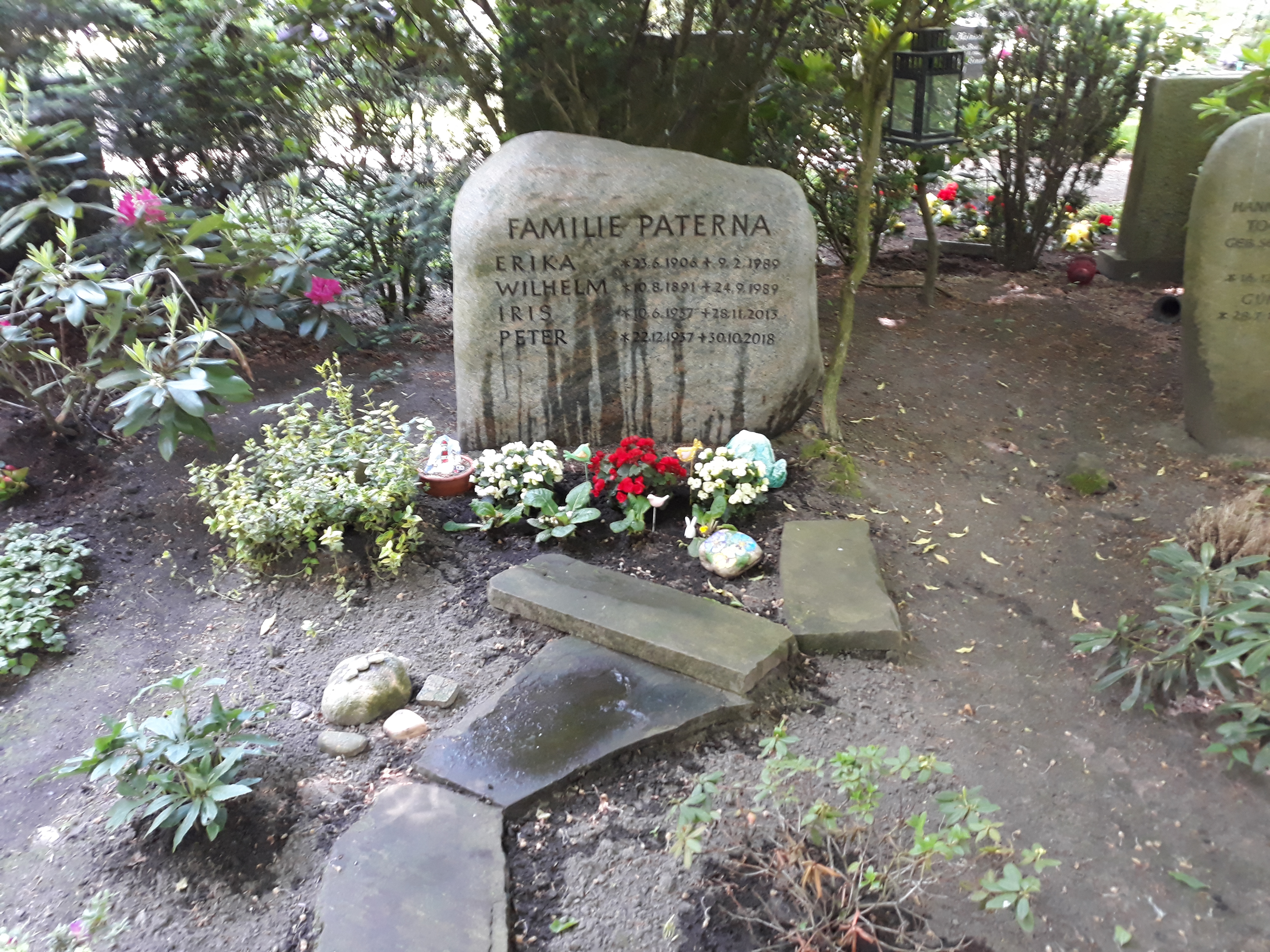
The grave of Peter Paterna and his wife Iris in the Old Niendorf Cemetery in Hamburg

== Literature ==
- Rudolf Vierhaus, Ludolf Herbst (Hrsg.), Bruno Jahn (Mitarb.): Biographisches Handbuch der Mitglieder des Deutschen Bundestages. 1949–2002. Bd. 2: N–Z. Anhang. K. G. Saur, München 2002, ISBN 978-3-598-23782-9, S. 631–632.
