= Mareike Engels =

German politician (born 1988)

Member of the Hamburg Parliament
- Incumbent
- Assumed office 14 April 2015
- Preceded by: Till Steffen
- Constituency: Altona

Personal details
- Born: 6 July 1988 (age 38) Weener
- Party: Alliance 90/The Greens (since 2008)

Mareike Engels (born 6 July 1988 in Weener) is a German politician serving as a member of the Hamburg Parliament since 2015. She has served as first vice president of the Parliament since 2020.
