= Katrin Helling-Plahr =

German lawyer and politician

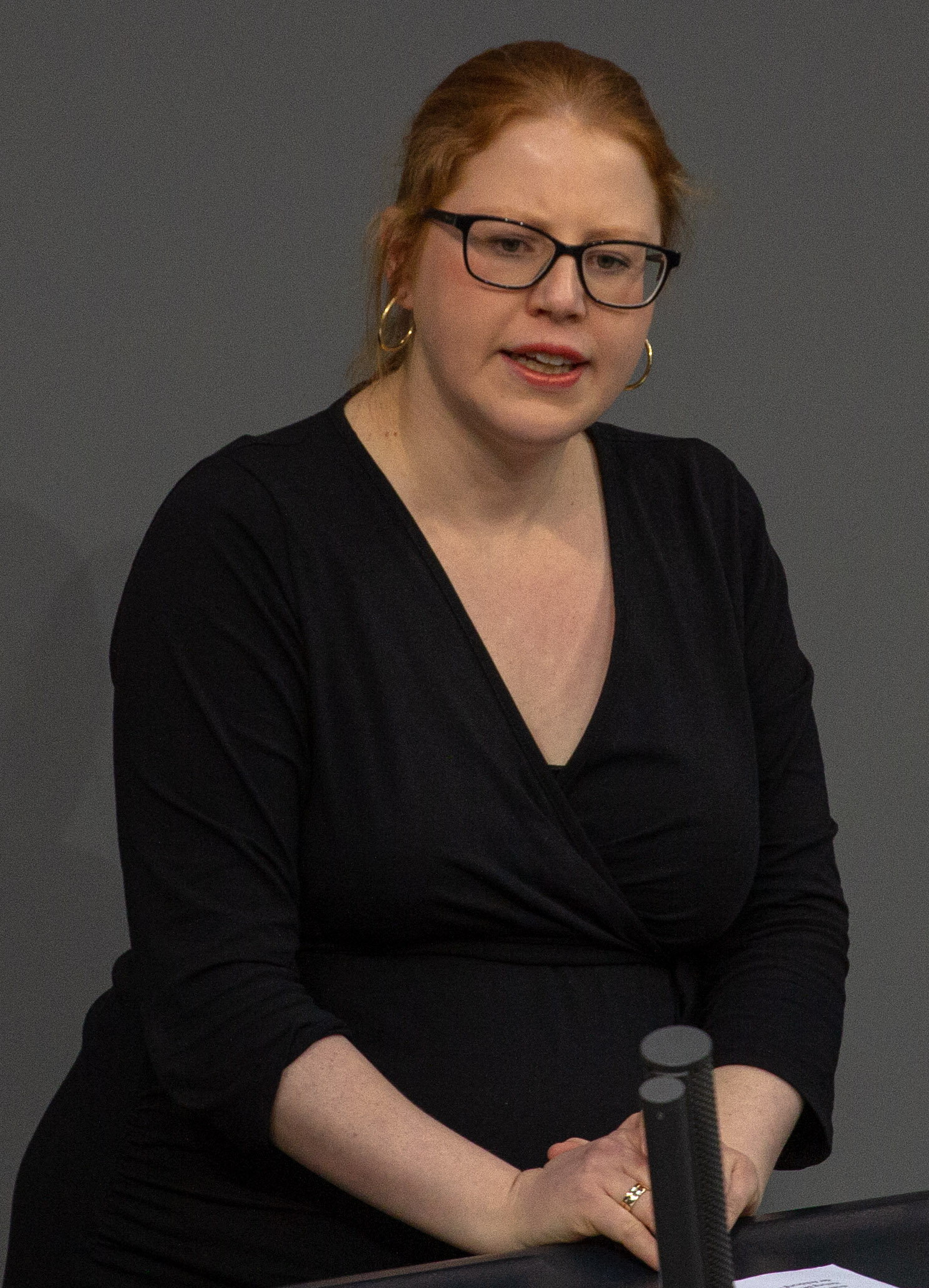
- Katrin Helling-Plahr in 2019

Member of the Bundestag
- In office 2017–2025

Personal details
- Born: 2 April 1986 (age 40) Hagen, West Germany (now Germany)
- Party: FDP
- Children: 2

Katrin Helling-Plahr (German pronunciation: [kaˈtʁiːn ˌhɛlɪŋˈplaːɐ̯, ˈkatʁiːn -]; born 2 April 1986) is a German lawyer and politician of the Free Democratic Party (FDP) who served as a member of the Bundestag from the 2017 to 2025.

== Early life and career ==
Helling-Plahr was born in Hagen. From 2005 to 2011, she studied law at the University of Münster. Since 2013 she has been practicing as a lawyer. From 2014 to 2015, she completed a postgraduate LL.M. program with a focus on medical law at Heinrich Heine University in Düsseldorf.

== Political career ==
=== Early beginnings ===
Helling-Plahr joined the FDP in 2005. From 2011 to 2014, she served as deputy chair of the party's youth organization, the Young Liberals.

=== Member of the German Parliament, 2017–2025 ===
Helling-Plahr first became a member of the German Bundestag in the 2017 federal election, representing the Hagen – Ennepe-Ruhr-Kreis I district. In parliament, she served on the Committee on Legal Affairs (2018–2025) and the Committee on Health (2018–2021). From 2018 to 2021, she was also a member of the Subcommittee on Global Health and the Committee on the Election of Judges (Wahlausschuss), which is in charge of appointing judges to the Federal Constitutional Court of Germany. Since 2022, she has been serving on the parliamentary body in charge of appointing judges to the Highest Courts of Justice, namely the Federal Court of Justice (BGH), the Federal Administrative Court (BVerwG), the Federal Fiscal Court (BFH), the Federal Labour Court (BAG), and the Federal Social Court (BSG).

As a health expert, Helling-Plar has been working on issues such as egg donation and surrogacy and assisted suicide. Since the 2021 elections, she served as her parliamentary group's spokesperson for legal affairs.

In the negotiations to form a coalition government between the SPD, the Green Party and FDP following the 2021 elections, Helling-Plahr was part of her party's delegation in the working group on equality, co-chaired by Petra Köpping, Ricarda Lang and Herbert Mertin.

== Other activities ==
- Stiftung Forum Recht, Member of the Board of Trustees (since 2022)

== Political positions ==
Along with Karl Lauterbach, Swen Schulz, Otto Fricke and Petra Sitte, Helling-Plahr was one of the authors of a cross-party initiative in 2021 to liberalize the legal framework for assisted suicide in Germany.

Amid the COVID-19 pandemic in Germany, Helling-Plahr joined forces with six other parliamentarians – Dirk Wiese, Heike Baehrens, Dagmar Schmidt, Janosch Dahmen, Till Steffen and Marie-Agnes Strack-Zimmermann – on a cross-party initiative in 2022 to support legislation that would have required all adults to be vaccinated.

== Personal life ==
Helling-Plahr is married to lawyer Alexander Plahr. The couple has two children.
