= Angelika Mertens =

German politician (1952–2019)

Member of the Bundestag; for Hamburg-Eimsbüttel
- In office 10 November 1994 – 18 October 2005
- Preceded by: Peter Paterna
- Succeeded by: Niels Annen

Personal details
- Born: 11 October 1952 Harsefeld, West Germany
- Died: 19 June 2019 (aged 66) Harsefeld, Germany
- Party: Social Democratic
- Education: Hamburg University of Economy and Politics

Angelika Mertens (11 October 1952 – 19 June 2019) was a German politician. She was parliamentary state secretary at the Federal Ministry of Transport, Building and Urban Affairs from 2000 until 2005.

== Early life ==
Mertens was born in 1952 in Harsefeld. She was a bookseller and studied economics. In 1969 she joined the Social Democratic Party of Germany (SPD) and was a member of the Young Socialists.

== Political career ==
Mertens held a municipal council position in Eimsbüttel from 1987 to 1994. After successfully running in the 1994 German federal election, Mertens was a member of the Bundestag, representing the Hamburg-Eimsbüttel electoral district. She was the SPD parliamentary group's spokesperson on transport and building policy from 1998, and then became parliamentary state secretary in the transport ministry during the first and second Schröder cabinet. She did not run in the 2005 election, ending her term in the Bundestag.

After leaving parliament, she was chairwoman of the Arbeiter-Samariter-Bund in Hamburg from 2006 until her unexpected death in June 2019.
