= Weener =

- Town
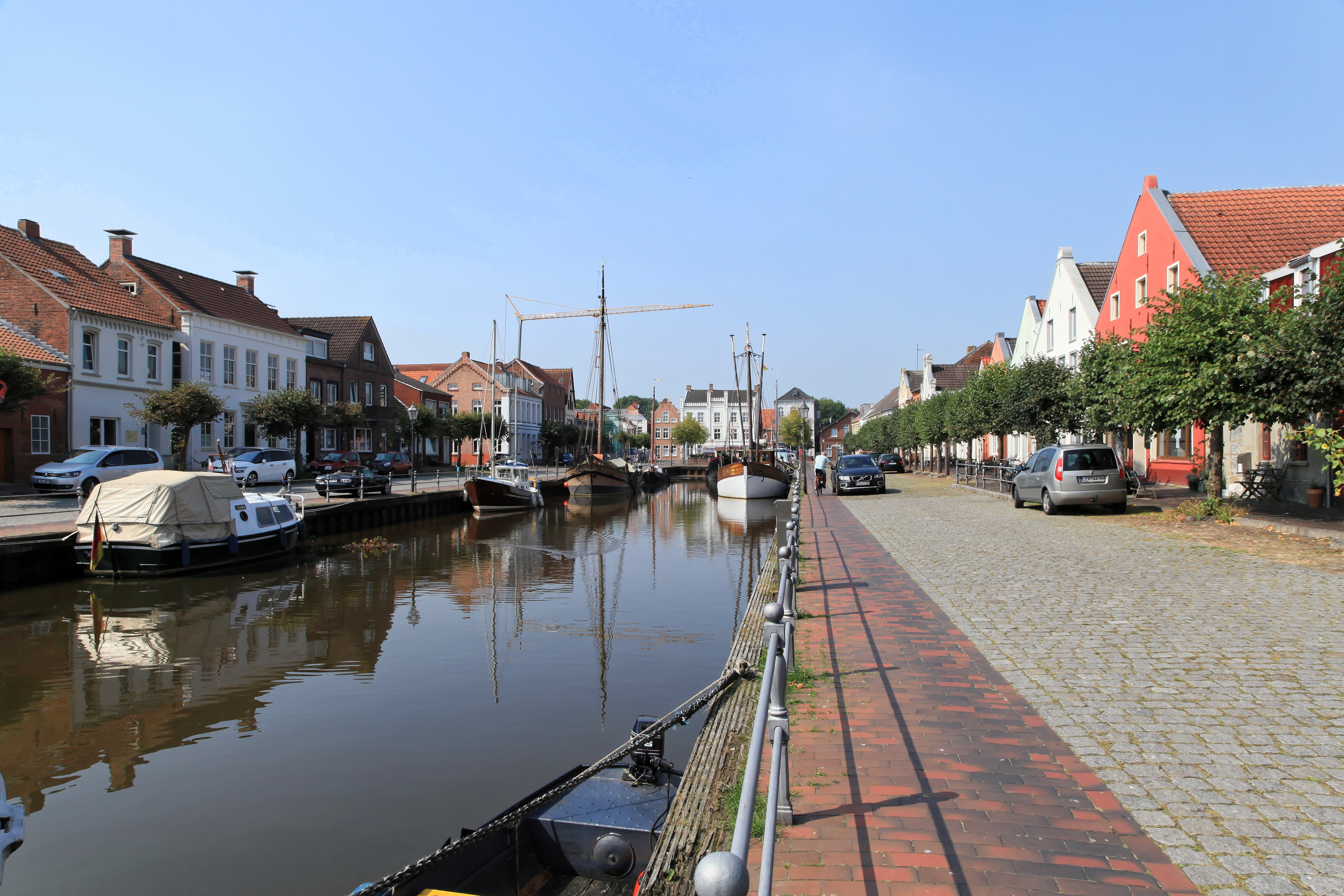
- View of Weener

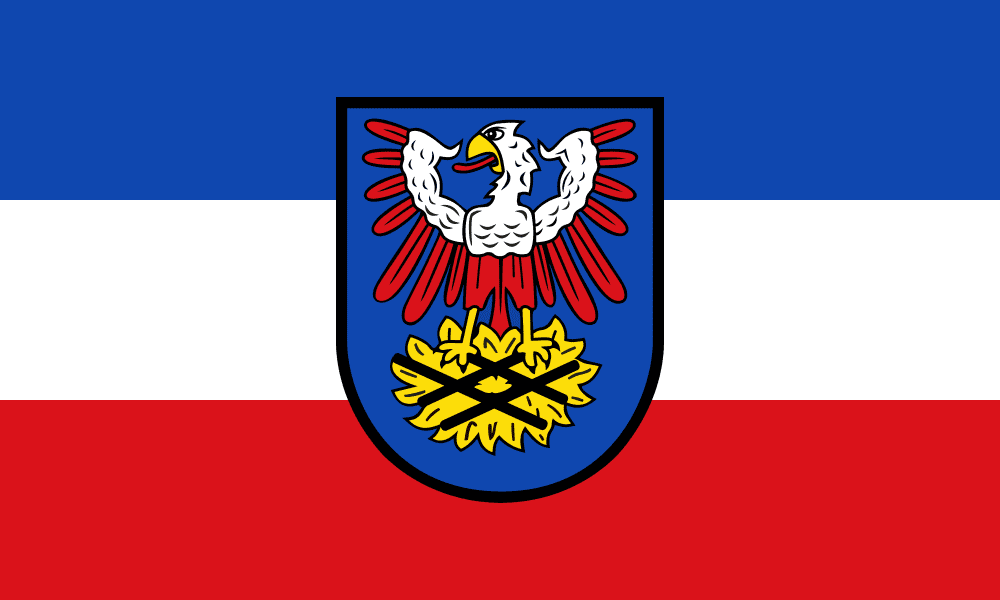
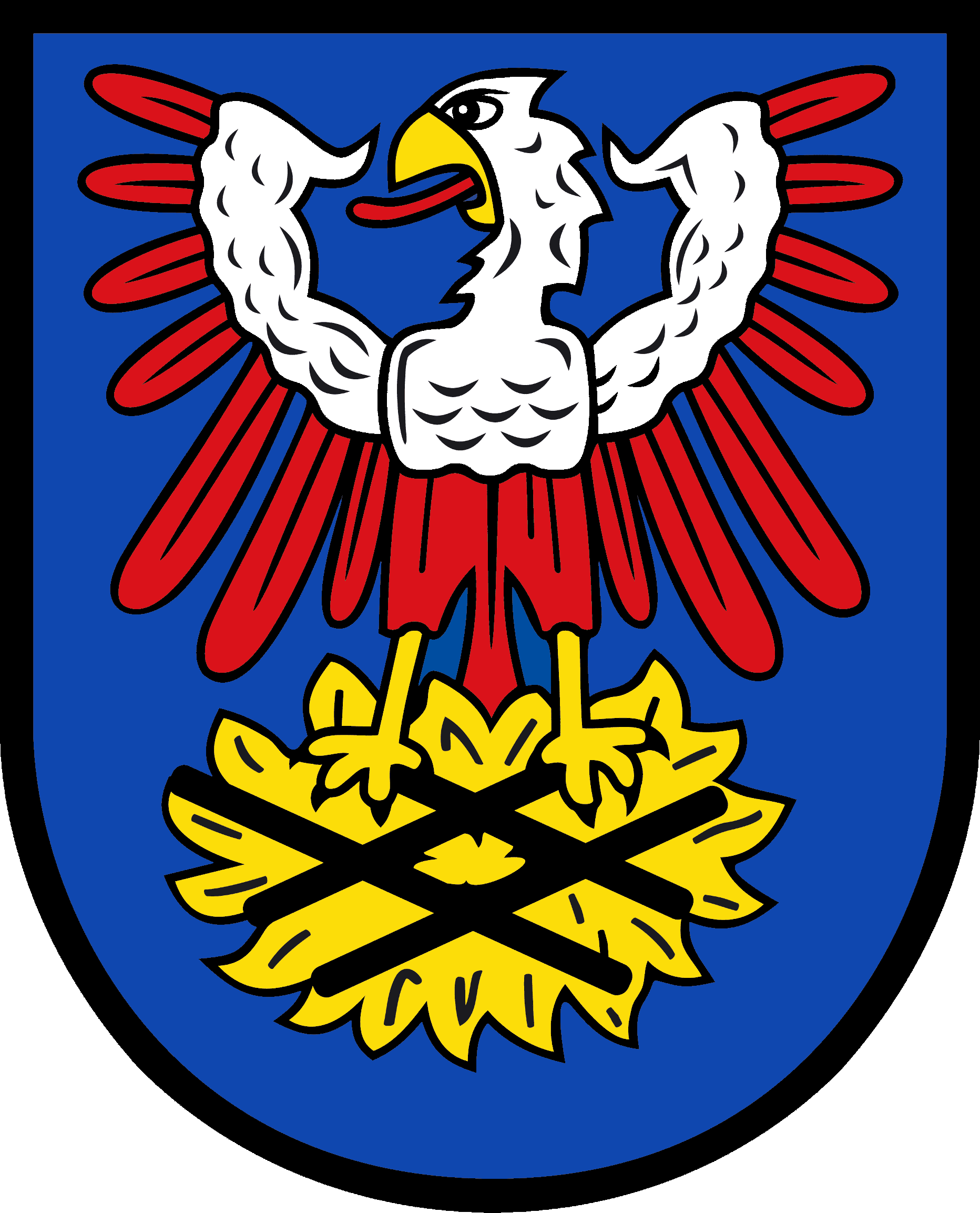
- Flag Coat of arms

- Location of Weener within Leer district
- Interactive map of Weener
- Location within Germany Location within Lower Saxony
- Coordinates: 53°10′09″N 07°21′23″E
- Country: Germany
- State: Lower Saxony
- District: Leer
- Subdivisions: 9 districts

Government
  - Mayor (2021–26): Heiko Abbas (CDU)

Area
  - Total: 81.23 km^{2} (31.36 sq mi)
- Elevation: 5 m (16 ft)

Population (2025-12-31)
  - Total: 15,243
  - Density: 187.7/km^{2} (486.0/sq mi)
- Time zone: UTC+01:00 (CET)
  - Summer (DST): UTC+02:00 (CEST)
- Postal codes: 26826
- Dialling codes: 04951
- Vehicle registration: LER
- Website: www.weener.de

Weener (German pronunciation: [ˈveːnɐ]) is a town in the district of Leer, in Lower Saxony, Germany. It is situated near the border with the Netherlands, on the river Ems. The town's population is at 15,654, making it the largest town of the region Rheiderland. It has a railway and autobahn connection to Groningen, Netherlands, Emden and Bremen.

The city was first mentioned in a monastery's records in 951.

== Town ==
=== Division of the town ===
The town of Weener consists of 9 districts:

- Weener
- Kirchborgum
- Diele
- Vellage / Halte
- Stapelmoor
- Holthusen
- Weenermoor / Möhlenwarf
- St. Georgiwold
- Beschotenweg

=== Neighbouring communities ===
In the district of Leer:

- Bunde
- Leer
- Jemgum
- Westoverledingen

In the district of Emsland:

- Papenburg
- Rhede

== Politics ==
=== Mayor ===
- 2006–2014: Wilhelm Dreesmann
- 2014–2021: Ludwig Sonnenberg
- 2021–incumbent: Heiko Abbas

=== Town Council ===
The composition of the town council for the 2021-2026 electoral period is:

- SPD = 15 seats
- CDU = 8 seats
- UWG = 2 seats
- Grüne = 3 seats
- AfD = 1 seat
- Ratsmitglied Junker = 1 seat
- Ratsmitglied S. Hinderks = 1 seat
- Bürgermeister Abbas = 1 seat

== International relations ==
Weener is twinned with:

- Eurajoki in Finland
- Les Pieux in France

== Demographics ==
Statistics are as of December 31 of each year:

- 1980 – 14.115
- 1985 – 14.245
- 1990 – 14.320
- 1995 – 14.831
- 2000 – 15.338
- 2001 – 15.406
- 2002 – 15.534
- 2003 – 15.625
- 2004 – 15.666
- 2005 – 15.602
- 2018 – 16.276

== Climate ==
Weener is in a temperate climate zone, influenced by the North Sea. During the summer, the temperatures are lower than those in the rest of Germany. In winter, the temperatures are higher than the other regions.

== Previous residents ==
Recent findings published in the academic periodical Zeitschrift für Geschichtswissenschaft (Journal of Historical Studies) by the German historian Jürgen Matthäus, show that Jakobus Onnen, a German citizen born in the adjoining hamlet of Tichelwarf, is erroneously listed as a war victim on the memorial located at the Heimatverein Rheiderland museum in Weener is the perpetrator photographed in "The Last Jew in Vinnitsa". This massacre was most likely carried out on 28 July 1941 in Berdychiv by the Einsatzgruppe C, a mobile death squad of the Nazi SS, of which Jakobus Onnen was a member.

== People ==
- Mareike Engels (born 1988), German politician
