= Dirk Wiese (politician) =

German politician (born 1983)

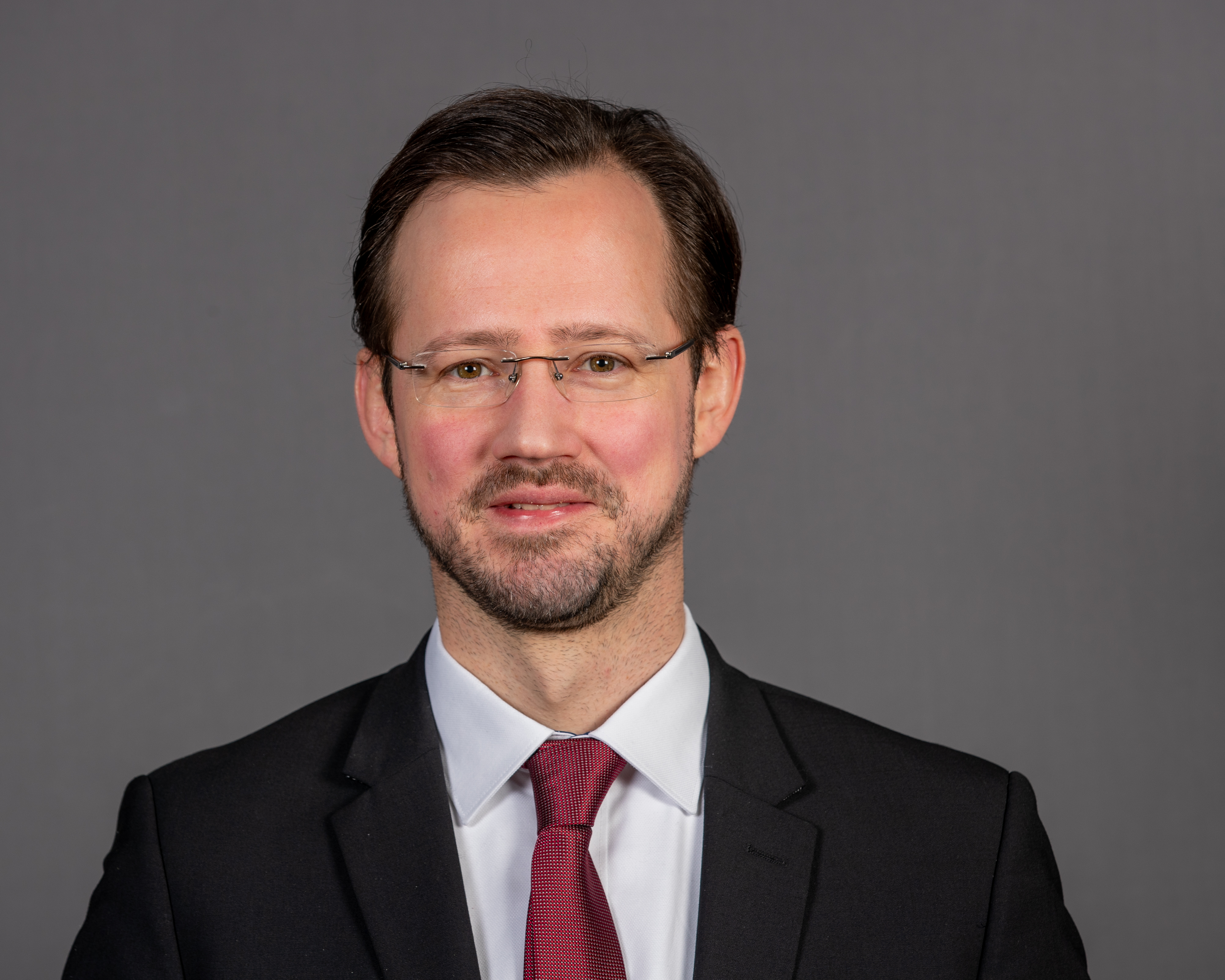
- Dirk Wiese in 2020

Member of the Bundestag
- Incumbent
- Assumed office 2013

Personal details
- Born: 11 July 1983 (age 43) Paderborn, West Germany (now Germany)
- Party: SPD
- Education: University of Münster

Dirk Wiese (born 11 July 1983) is a German politician of the Social Democratic Party (SPD) who has been serving as a member of the Bundestag from the state of North Rhine-Westphalia since 2013.

In addition to his parliamentary work, Wiese served as a Parliamentary State Secretary at the Federal Ministry of Economic Affairs and Energy under Minister Brigitte Zypries, in the coalition government of Chancellor Angela Merkel from 2017 until 2018. From 2018 until 2020, he was the German government's Coordinator for Inter-Societal Cooperation with Russia, Central Asia and the Eastern Partnership Countries at the Federal Foreign Office.

== Early career ==
From 2010 until 2013, Wiese worked as legislative advisor to Franz Müntefering.

== Political career ==
Wiese became a member of the Bundestag in the 2013 German federal election, representing the Hochsauerlandkreis district.

In parliament, Wiese has served as a member of the Committee on Food and Agriculture (2014-2015, 2018–2020), the Committee on Legal Affairs and Consumer Protection (2014-2017); the Subcommittee on the United Nations, International Organizations and Globalization (2014-2017); and the Committee on Economic Affairs and Energy (2015-2017). Since 2014, he has been an alternate member of the parliamentary body in charge of appointing judges to the Highest Courts of Justice, namely the Federal Court of Justice (BGH), the Federal Administrative Court (BVerwG), the Federal Fiscal Court (BFH), the Federal Labour Court (BAG), and the Federal Social Court (BSG).

In addition to his committee assignments, Wiese has been chairing the German-Indian Parliamentary Friendship Group since 2018. He is also part of a cross-party group in support of Schützenverein culture.

Within his parliamentary group, Wiese served as one of the three speakers of the Seeheim Circle from 2018 to 2025. From 2020 to 2025, he served as one of his parliamentary group's deputy chairpersons, under the leadership of chairman Rolf Mützenich. Since 2023, he has also been leading the Bundestag group of SPD parliamentarians from North Rhine-Westphalia, the largest delegation within the party’s parliamentary group, alongside Wiebke Esdar.

Since the 2025 elections, Wiese has been his parliamentary group's chief whip, under the leadership of chairman Matthias Miersch.

== Other activities ==
- Business Forum of the Social Democratic Party of Germany, Member of the Political Advisory Board (since 2020)
- German Foundation for International Legal Cooperation (IRZ), Member (since 2020)
- Memorial to the Murdered Jews of Europe Foundation, Member of the Board of Trustees (since 2020)
- Agency for Renewable Resources (FNR), Member of the advisory board (2018-2020)

== Political positions ==
Amid the COVID-19 pandemic in Germany, Wiese joined forces with six other parliamentarians – Heike Baehrens, Dagmar Schmidt, Janosch Dahmen, Till Steffen, Katrin Helling-Plahr and Marie-Agnes Strack-Zimmermann – on a cross-party initiative in 2022 to support legislation that would have required all adults to be vaccinated.
