= Niels Annen =

German politician and member of the SPD

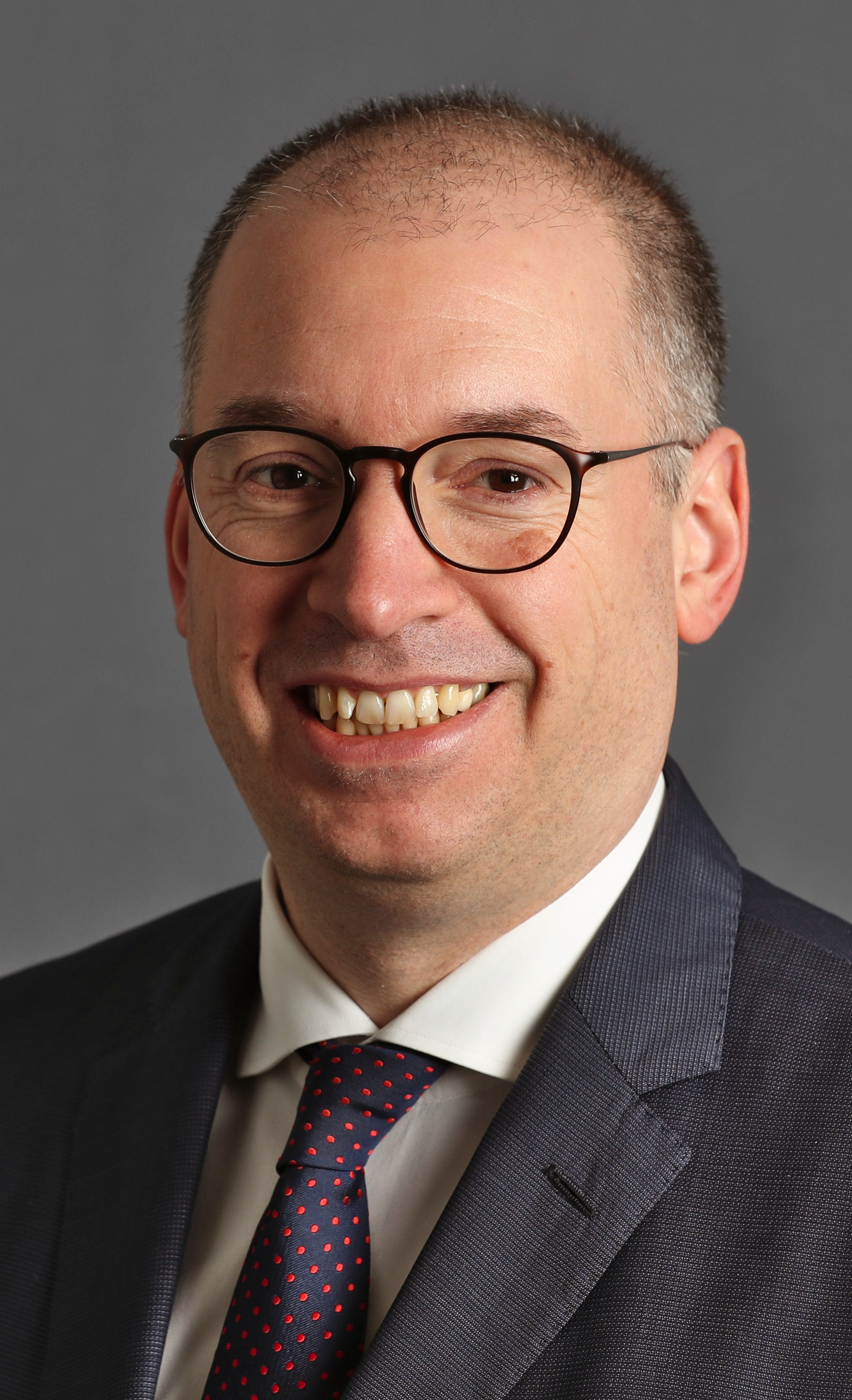
- Annen in 2020

Member of the Bundestag; from Hamburg
- In office 22 October 2013 – 25 March 2025
- Preceded by: Rüdiger Kruse
- Succeeded by: Multi-member district
- Constituency: Hamburg-Eimsbüttel (2013–2021); State list (2021–2025)
- In office 18 October 2005 – 27 October 2009
- Preceded by: Angelika Mertens
- Succeeded by: Rüdiger Kruse
- Constituency: Hamburg-Eimsbüttel

Personal details
- Born: 6 April 1973 (age 53) Eimsbüttel, Hamburg, West Germany
- Party: Social Democratic
- Education: Humboldt University of Berlin; Johns Hopkins University

Niels Annen (born 6 April 1973) is a German politician of the Social Democratic Party (SPD). Since May 2025, he has been serving as a State Secretary at the Federal Ministry for Economic Cooperation and Development (BMZ). From December 2021 until May 2025, he was Parliamentary State Secretary in the same ministry. Prior to that, from March 2018 to December 2021, he served as Minister of State at the Federal Foreign Office in the government of Chancellor Angela Merkel.

Niels Annen was elected to the German Bundestag four times, representing the constituency of Hamburg-Eimsbüttel from 2005 to 2009, and again from 2013 to 2025. After his first term in the Bundestag Annen was a Senior Transatlantic Resident at the German Marshall Fund in Washington between 2010 and 2011. From 2011 until 2013 he worked for the department for International Policy Analysis of the Friedrich Ebert Foundation in Berlin. Annen has served on the executive board of the SPD since 2003 after being chairman of the Young Socialists, the youth organization of the SPD, from 2001 to 2004.

== Early life and education ==
Born to a works council member of Lufthansa, Annen graduated from high school in 1992.

In 2009, Annen obtained a bachelor's degree in history from the Humboldt University of Berlin, with a thesis on the resettlement of Baltic Germans during World War 2. Subsequently, he obtained a master's degree in International Public Policy from the Paul H. Nitze School of Advanced International Studies at Johns Hopkins University in Washington, D.C. in 2011.

During his first term in the Bundestag from 2005 to 2009, Annen had been criticised as "an eternal student in the Bundestag", after quitting a history degree in which he had been enrolled for 14 years.

Besides his native language German, Annen speaks English and Spanish fluently. Moreover, he has basic knowledge of French and Portuguese.

== Political career ==
=== Chairman of the Young Socialists (2001–2004) ===
Annen served as national chairman of the SPD's youth organization from 2001 to 2004.

=== Career in national politics ===
Annen was elected to the Bundestag, the German federal parliament, at the 2005 election, representing the Hamburg-Eimsbüttel district. In parliament, he serves on the Committee on Foreign Affairs.

As a member of Committee on Foreign Affairs, Annen established himself as a left-wing SPD foreign policy expert, focusing largely on the German engagement in Afghanistan and the Middle East. Within the committee he has served on the Subcommittee for Arms Control and Non Proliferation as well as the Subcommittee for the United Nations.

Within the SPD parliamentary group, he was co-chairman of the Parliamentary Left, the largest political coalition within the SPD. Between 2005 and 2009, he also served as Deputy Chairman of the German-Spanish Parliamentary Friendship Group.

Under controversial circumstances Annen was deselected for the 2009 election, losing a primary election to Danial Ilkhanipour by 45 votes to 44. Ilkhanipour lost the seat at the 2009 election to the CDU candidate Rüdiger Kruse. In March 2010, Annen joined the German Marshall Fund as a Senior Fellow in Washington, D.C., for a six-month term. Between 2011 and 2013, he served as director of European policy analysis at the Berlin headquarters of the Friedrich Ebert Foundation, whose aim is to promote democracy, political education, and promote students of outstanding intellectual abilities and personality

Annen returned to the Bundestag at the 2013 election, regaining the Hamburg-Eimsbüttel district from the CDU. He soon re-entered the leadership of the Parliamentary Left in 2014. He also serves as chairman of the Parliamentary Friendship Group for Relations with the States of South Asia, including Afghanistan, Bangladesh, Bhutan, Maldives, Nepal, Pakistan, and Sri Lanka. Between 2014 and 2015, he represented his parliamentary group in a crossparty committee headed by former defense minister Volker Rühe to review the country's parliamentary rules on military deployments.

Within the SPD, Annen serves as chairman of the SPD's Commission for International Politics, alongside Martin Schulz. In the negotiations to form a coalition government under the leadership of Chancellor Angela Merkel following the 2017 federal elections, he was part of the working group on foreign policy, led by Ursula von der Leyen, Gerd Müller and Sigmar Gabriel.

Annen co-chaired the SPD's national conventions in Dortmund (2017) Wiesbaden (2018) and Berlin (2019).

=== Minister of State at the Federal Foreign Office (2018–2021) ===
In March 2018, Annen was appointed Minister of State at the German Federal Foreign Office in the fourth Merkel Cabinet, alongside Michael Roth and Michelle Müntefering.

=== Parliamentary State Secretary to the Minister of Economic Cooperation and Development ===
In December 2021, Annen was appointed Parliamentary State Secretary to the Minister of Economic Cooperation and Development.

In June 2024, Annen announced that he would not stand in the 2025 federal elections but instead resign from active politics by the end of the parliamentary term.

=== State Secretary to the Minister of Economic Cooperation and Development ===
Since May 2025, Annen is the State Secretary of the Federal Ministry for Economic Cooperation and Development. In this function, he is top administrative official and responsible for the ministry's administration and continuity, working closely with the minister to implement policies and manage the ministry's daily affairs.

=== Candidate for United Nations High Commissioner for Refugees (UNHCR) ===
In September 2024, the German government nominated Annen as its candidate to succeed Filippo Grandi in the position of United Nations High Commissioner for Refugees; the role instead went to Barham Salih.

== Other activities ==
=== Corporate boards ===
- GIZ, Member of the Supervisory Board (since 2025)
- German Investment Corporation (DEG), Chair of the Supervisory Board (2022–2025)

=== International organizations ===
- Asian Development Bank (ADB), Ex-Officio Member of the Board of Governors (2022–2025)
- Inter-American Development Bank (IDB), Ex-Officio Member of the Board of Governors (2022–2025)

=== Non-profit organizations ===
- Centre for International Peace Operations (ZIF), Ex-Officio Member of the Supervisory Board (since 2022)
- German Foundation for Peace Research (DSF), Ex-Officio Member of the Board (since 2022)
- European Council on Foreign Relations, Member
- German Council on Foreign Relations (DGAP), Member of the Presidium
- German Institute for International and Security Affairs (SWP), Member of the Council
- German Institute of Global and Area Studies (GIGA), Member of the Board of Trustees
- Gustav Heinemann Civic Award of the SPD, Member of the Board of Trustees
- Federal Chancellor Helmut Schmidt Foundation, Substitute Member of the Board of Trustees (since 2017)
- Herbert and Elsbeth Weichmann Foundation, Member of the Board of Trustees
- Institute for Peace Research and Security Policy at the University of Hamburg, Member of the Board of Trustees
- German United Services Trade Union (ver.di), Member

=== Editorial boards ===
- spw – Zeitschrift für sozialistische Politik und Wirtschaft, Member of the Editorial Board (since 2006)

== Political positions ==
=== Afghanistan and Pakistan ===
Annen is an advocate of continued German commitment in Afghanistan and has visited the country on multiple occasions during both of his terms in the Bundestag. Amid discussions in the Social Democratic Party on whether to terminate Germany's mandate for German elite commando troops within the US-run Operation Enduring Freedom (OEF) against Taliban fighters, Annen in 2007 said many SPD members were questioning Germany's continued role in the anti-terror battle in Afghanistan. He stated that "[m]any say [the SPD] is losing its way as a party oriented to finding peaceful solutions to international problems". Along with Green MP Jürgen Trittin, Annen claimed that the American counterinsurgency mission was hindering civilian reconstruction under the umbrella of the second mission, the International Security Assistance Force, because of what they called a heavy-handed approach by the U.S. military on the ground that was alienating the local population. In 2014, he voted in favor of continuing German participation in ISAF.

In April 2014, Annen accompanied Norbert Lammert as well as fellow members of the German Parliament Marieluise Beck and Hans-Peter Uhl on a visit to Pakistan, where they met with President Mamnoon Hussain, Chairman of the Senate Nayyar Hussain Bukhari and Interior Minister Nisar Ali Khan.

In April 2015, Annen went on another trip to the region with the German-South-Asian Parliamentary Group. In Afghanistan, the group met with delegates of both the upper and lower houses of parliament and it met with President Mamnoon Hussain during its trip to Pakistan. A central point of discussion in both countries was the security in the region. In a speech on 23 April 2015, after his return from the visit, Annen said that, amidst some negative developments, there were clear positive trends visible in Afghanistan especially regarding rising rates of school enrolment and the state of democratic elections.

=== Transatlantic relations ===
Annen has frequently expressed dissatisfaction with the information provided by NATO headquarters. Following statements by the Supreme Allied Commander Europe (SACEUR), General Philip M. Breedlove, on troop advances on the border between Russia and Ukraine in early 2015, Annen publicly complained that "NATO in the past has always announced a new Russian offensive just as, from our point of view, the time had come for cautious optimism." He added that "we parliamentarians were often confused by information regarding alleged troop movements that were inconsistent with the information we had."

In 2008, Annen called on the United States to remove all nuclear weapons stored in military bases in Germany after a U.S. Air Force report found that safety standards at most sites for nuclear weapons in Europe fall well short of Pentagon requirements.

In July 2015, Annen joined Germany's Foreign Minister Frank-Walter Steinmeier on a trip to Cuba; it was the first time a German foreign minister had visited the country since German reunification in 1990.

=== Military engagement on the African continent ===
Annen has in the past voted in favor of German participation in United Nations peacekeeping missions as well as in United Nations-mandated European Union peacekeeping missions on the African continent, such as in Somalia – Operation Atalanta (2014) and EUTM Somalia (2015 and 2016) –, Darfur/Sudan (2013, 2014, 2015, 2017 and 2018), South Sudan (2013, 2014, 2015, 2017 and 2018), the Central African Republic (2014) and Mali – both MINUSMA (2014, 2017 and 2018) and EUTM Mali (2015 and 2018).

=== Russo-Ukrainian war ===
Regarding the Russo-Ukrainian war since 2014, Annen has advocated for continued dialogue with the Russian Federation in order to facilitate "good neighbourly relations." However, he supported economic sanctions against Russia as well as its exclusion from the G7 saying that "Russia un-invited itself" with the internationally wrongful annexation of Crimea. Moreover, he supported the absence of Chancellor Angela Merkel from the festivities for the 70th anniversary of the end of the Second World War in Russia on 9 May 2015 stating that "the political conditions for a German participation in the festivities are currently not fulfilled."

Annen also responded angrily to statements by U.S. Senator John McCain, who said that Germany was pursuing appeasement policies akin to those of the 1930s. Furthermore, he stated that "nobody in Europe did as much to support peace in Europe as Steinmeier and Merkel" (the German Foreign Minister and Chancellor) and demanded a public apology from the Senator. Annen rejected American plans to supply arms to Ukrainian forces stating that it "would be a dangerous step towards the escalation of the Ukraine conflict."

=== Middle East ===
Annen has made public statements about the transnational conflict against Islamic State in Syria and Iraq. In an interview with Das Parlament on 15 September 2014, he underlined the relevance of the conflict for Germany, stating that the risk of terrorist attacks had risen as the result of German IS-fighters returning from the battlefield. Moreover, he supported the supply of German arms to the Kurdish Peshmerga forces claiming that he was well aware of the danger of future misuse of the weapons but saw no other way to help defend the city of Erbil from IS forces. Annen also considered the Syrian President Bashar al-Assad partially responsible for the formation and strength of Islamic State, and warned of legitimizing Assad as the lesser evil in the conflict.

In April 2014, Annen visited the Zaatari refugee camp in Jordan to learn more about the plight of Syrians fleeing the violence in the ongoing Syrian civil war that erupted in 2011.

== Controversy ==
In 2014, news media revealed that Annen had not paid taxes for his second home in Berlin during his first term as a member of the Bundestag from 2005 to 2009.
