= Cemile Giousouf =

German politician

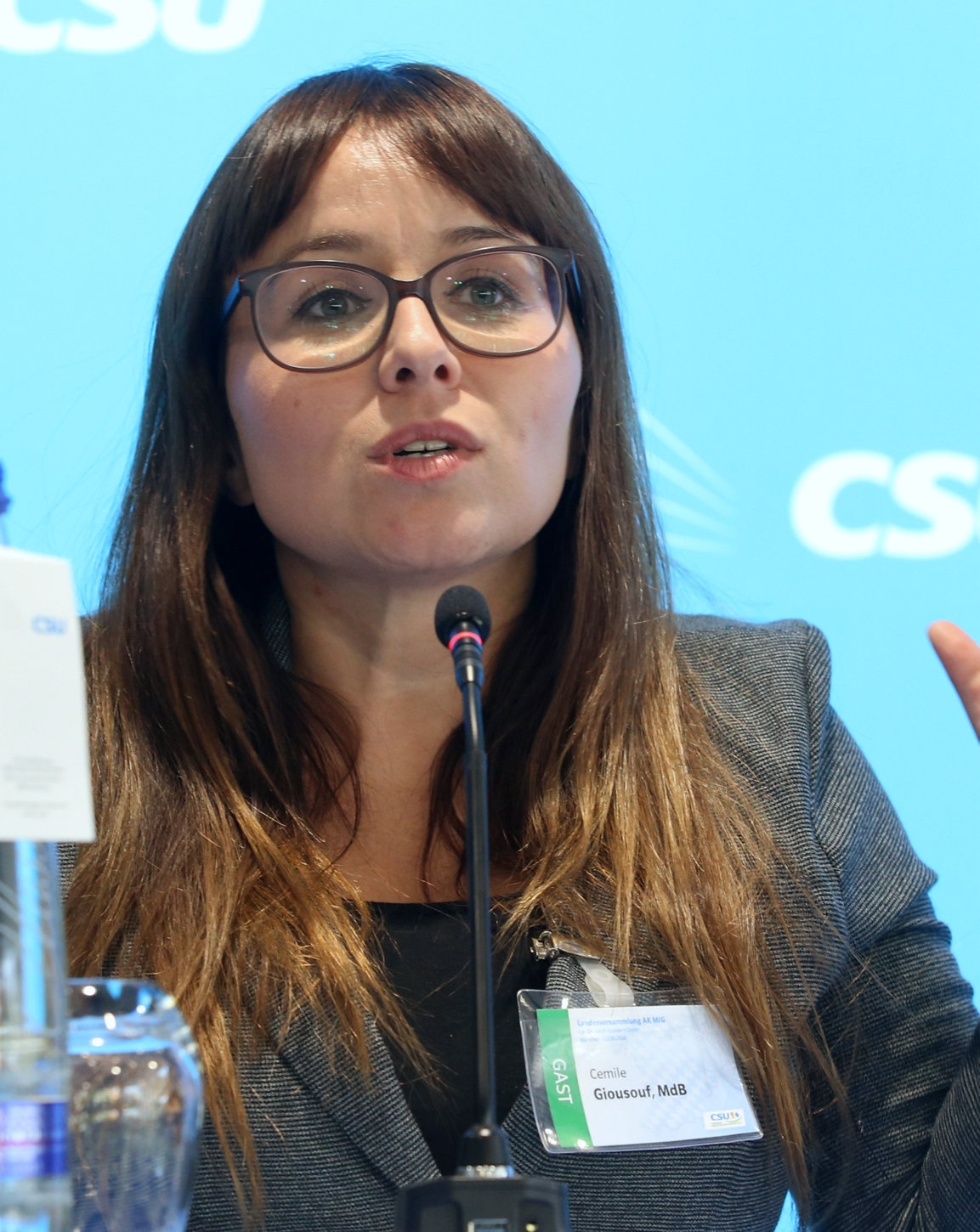
- Giousouf speaking in Munich in 2016

Personal details
- Born: 5 May 1978 (age 48) Leverkusen, Germany
- Citizenship: German, Greek
- Party: Christian Democratic Union (CDU)
- Education: University of Bonn
- Occupation: Politician
- Website: cemile-giousouf.de

Cemile Giousouf (Greek: Τζεμιλέ Γιουσούφ; Turkish: Cemile Yusuf; born 5 May 1978) is a German politician. She was the first ever Muslim member of the Christian Democratic Union (CDU), serving as Member of the Bundestag for one legislative term from 2013 until 2017. In January 2019, Giousouf was appointed Vice President of the Federal Agency for Civic Education.

== Early life and education ==
Giousouf was born on 5 May 1978 in Leverkusen to ethnic Turkish Gastarbeiter parents, who immigrated in the 1970s from Greece, where they had lived as a minority in Western Thrace. Soon after her birth, Giousouf was sent back to her uncle in Greece. At the age of two, Giousouf returned to her family in Germany. Giousouf has a brother.

The members of her immigrant family spoke Turkish as well as Greek at home as their native languages, denoting their ethnic ancestry and original nationality, as well as German. In addition to her German citizenship, Giousouf also holds Greek citizenship.

Following the completion of her high school education in Leverkusen with the Abitur, Giousouf studied political science, social science and Islamic science at the University of Bonn.

== Professional career ==
In 2008, Giousouf was employed as consultant in the State Ministry of Generations, Family, Women and Integration of North Rhine-Westphalia under the leadership of State Minister Armin Laschet. At the ministry, Giousouf was in charge of the "Women with Immigration History" dossier. From 2009, Giousouf served as consultant in the Department of Integration at the Ministry of Integration and Social Welfare of the same state.

== Political career ==
During her university years, Giousouf was active in the German-Turkish Forum, a subordinate organization of the Christian Democratic Union (CDU). In 2008, Giousouf was elected vice chairperson of the organization's North Rhine-Westphalia branch, to which she belonged since 2004. Giousouf was also active in the CDU's several other local organizations as well as in the city administration of Aachen.

With fashionable ponytails, hipster horn-rimmed glasses, and dressed in black Cemile Giousouf looks like the CDU as a whole would be like to be seen: urban, contemporary, elegant. The Muslim woman came to the Christian Democratic Union 15 years ago... As for the "C" [Christian] in the party name, she says "every child, regardless of religion, skin color and origin" should have the same chances in Germany.

Giousouf entered CDU's federal-level organization in 2011, where she was active on integration matters. On 30 June 2012 Giousouf was elected to the executive board of CDU state organization in North Rhine-Westphalia.

In 2013, the local organization of CDU in Hagen nominated Giousouf for the federal elections. In the next two preliminary inner-party elections, Giousouf was able to make her way for the federal election as direct candidate in the Ennepe-Ruhr-Kreis District in September 2013. Giousouf became the first ever Muslim politician of the CDU to be elected into the Bundestag.
In parliament, Giousouf was a member of the Committee on Education, Research and Technology Assessment. In this capacity, she was her parliamentary group’s rapporteur on state-funded scholarship schemes and the validation of foreign studies and degrees.

Giousouf, who was 24th on the state list of the CDU NRW and a direct candidate in the constituency Hagen – Ennepe-Ruhr-Kreis I, did not make it into the 19th German Bundestag.

In January 2019, Giousouf was appointed Vice President of the Federal Agency for Civic Education. This appointment was criticised in some quarters as Giousouf had "close contact" with "Turkish nationalists ('Grey Wolves'), Islamists (Millî Görüş) and Erdogan supporters (UETD)". Giousouf herself denied these accusations.

== Other activities ==
- Bonn International Award for Democracy, Member of the Board of Trustees
- Konrad Adenauer Foundation (KAS), Member of the Board of Trustees
- Avicenna-Studienwerk, Member of the Board of Trustees
- Council of Muslim Students and Academics (RAMSA), Member of the Board of Trustees
- Green Helmets, Member of the Board of Trustees
- Internationaler Bund (IB), Member of the Federal Counselling Committee
