= Rüdiger Kruse =

German politician (born 1961)

- Kruse in 2020

Member of the Bundestag; from Hamburg
- In office 27 October 2009 – 26 October 2021
- Preceded by: Niels Annen
- Succeeded by: Multi-member district
- Constituency: Hamburg-Eimsbüttel (2009–2013); State list (2013–2021)

Member of the Hamburg Parliament
- In office 10 October 2001 – September 2009
- Preceded by: Multi-member district
- Succeeded by: Vera Jürs
- Constituency: State list (2001–2008); Lokstedt – Niendorf – Schnelsen (2008–2009)

Personal details
- Born: 10 June 1961 (age 65) Hamburg, West Germany
- Party: Christian Democratic Union
- Education: University of Hamburg

Rüdiger Kruse (born 10 June 1961) is a German politician of the Christian Democratic Union (CDU) who served as a member of the German Bundestag from 2009 to 2021.

== Education and early career ==
Kruse was born in Hamburg, West Germany. After attending elementary school in Hamburg, Kruse studied medicine at University, but did not complete the course. In the year 2000, he was appointed managing director of the Eimsbuttel Einfal Initiative for working and learning. He subsequently became managing director of the Hamburg National Association for the Protection of German Forests and CEO of the Foundation Company Forest Germany – two shareholders of the Einfal company with 60 employees and approximately 900 participants. In addition, he served as a member of the Advisory Board of HSH Nordbank in Hamburg.

== Political career ==
=== Career in state politics ===
Kruse joined the CDU when he was 16. From 2001 until September 2009, he was a deputy in the Hamburg Parliament, where he was his parliamentary group's spokesman on policy development, finance, budget issues and sustainable development. He represented the CDU on several parliamentary committees, including the one on budgets, European affairs, environment and culture. In addition, he was a member of the Special Committee on Administrative Reform and two subcommittees, as well as finance areas and public companies. In 2007, Kruse was appointed to the City of Hamburg's Council on Climate Protection by Mayor Ole von Beust.

=== Career in national politics ===
Kruse was selected to contest the constituency of Hamburg-Eimsbüttel, which the CDU had never won and which the Social Democratic Party of Germany (SPD) had held since the 1950s. However, the crisis in the SPD presented an opportunity and in the 2009 federal election, the SPD vote collapsed, with the party finishing third. Kruse gained the seat for the CDU, despite a slight drop in the party's vote share.

In parliament, Kruse was a member of the Budget Committee and the Audit Committee. He was also a deputy member of the Committee on Environment, Nature Conservation and Nuclear Safety. A member of the Budget Committee from 2009, he served as his parliamentary group's rapporteur on the budgets of the Federal Chancellery; the Federal Government Commissioner for Culture and the Media; and the Federal Ministry of Transport and Digital Infrastructure (2018–2021). In the Audit Committee, he served as the rapporteur on the budget of the Federal Ministry of Defense (BMVg). Until 2017, he was also a member of the so-called Confidential Committee (Vertrauensgremium) of the Budget Committee, which provides budgetary supervision for Germany's three intelligence services, BND, BfV and MAD. In 2018, he also joined the Parliamentary Advisory Board for Sustainable Development.

In addition to his committee assignments, Kruse was a member of the German-British Parliamentary Friendship Group, the German-Israeli Parliamentary Friendship Group and the Parliamentary Friendship Group for Relations with the Baltic States (2009–2013). From 2019 to 2021, was a member of the German delegation to the Franco-German Parliamentary Assembly. In 2020, Kruse co-founded a cross-party working group on diversity and anti-racism.

In the negotiations to form a coalition government under the leadership of Chancellor Angela Merkel following the 2017 federal elections, Kruse was part of the working group on economic policy, led Thomas Strobl, Alexander Dobrindt and Brigitte Zypries.

== Other activities ==
=== Corporate boards ===
- UMPR Public Relations Agency, Member of the Advisory Board
- HSH Nordbank, Member of the Advisory Board (2009–2012)

=== Non-profit organizations ===
- Association for the Protection of the German Forest (SDW), Hamburg section, Managing Director
- German Industry Initiative for Energy Efficiency (DENEFF), Member of the Parliamentary Advisory Board
- Green Budget Germany (FÖS), Member of the Advisory Board
- Tarabya Academy, Member of the Advisory Board

== Political positions ==
Throughout his time on the Budget Committee, Kruse has been a proponent of the Merkel government's policy to refrain from any net new borrowing and instead focus all efforts on achieving a structurally balanced budget.

In June 2017, Kruse voted against his parliamentary group's majority and in favor of Germany's introduction of same-sex marriage.

Kruse opposes the extension of nuclear power plants.

In 2019, Kruse joined 14 members of his parliamentary group who, in an open letter, called for the party to rally around Angela Merkel and party chairwoman Annegret Kramp-Karrenbauer amid criticism voiced by conservatives Friedrich Merz and Roland Koch. He later endorsed Norbert Röttgen as Kramp-Karrenbauer's successor at the party's 2021 leadership election.
