= Danial Ilkhanipour =

German politician (born 1981)

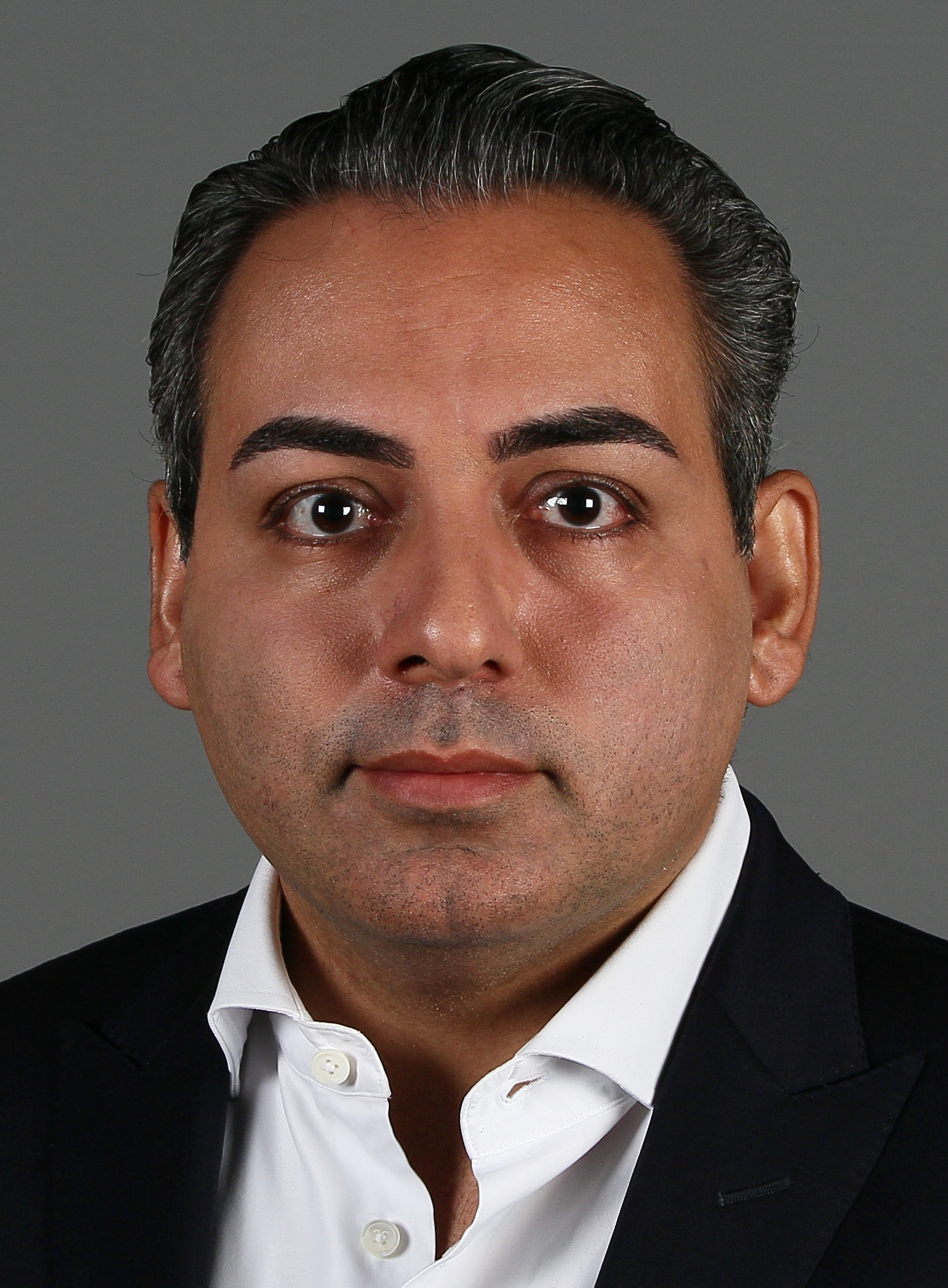
- Ilkhanipour in 2018

Member of the Hamburg Parliament
- Incumbent
- Assumed office 2 March 2015

Personal details
- Born: 16 October 1981 (age 44)
- Party: Social Democratic Party (since 1998)

Danial Ilkhanipour (born 16 October 1981) is a German politician serving as a member of the Hamburg Parliament since 2015. From 2007 to 2009, he served as chairman of Jusos in Hamburg.
