= Timo Schisanowski =

German politician

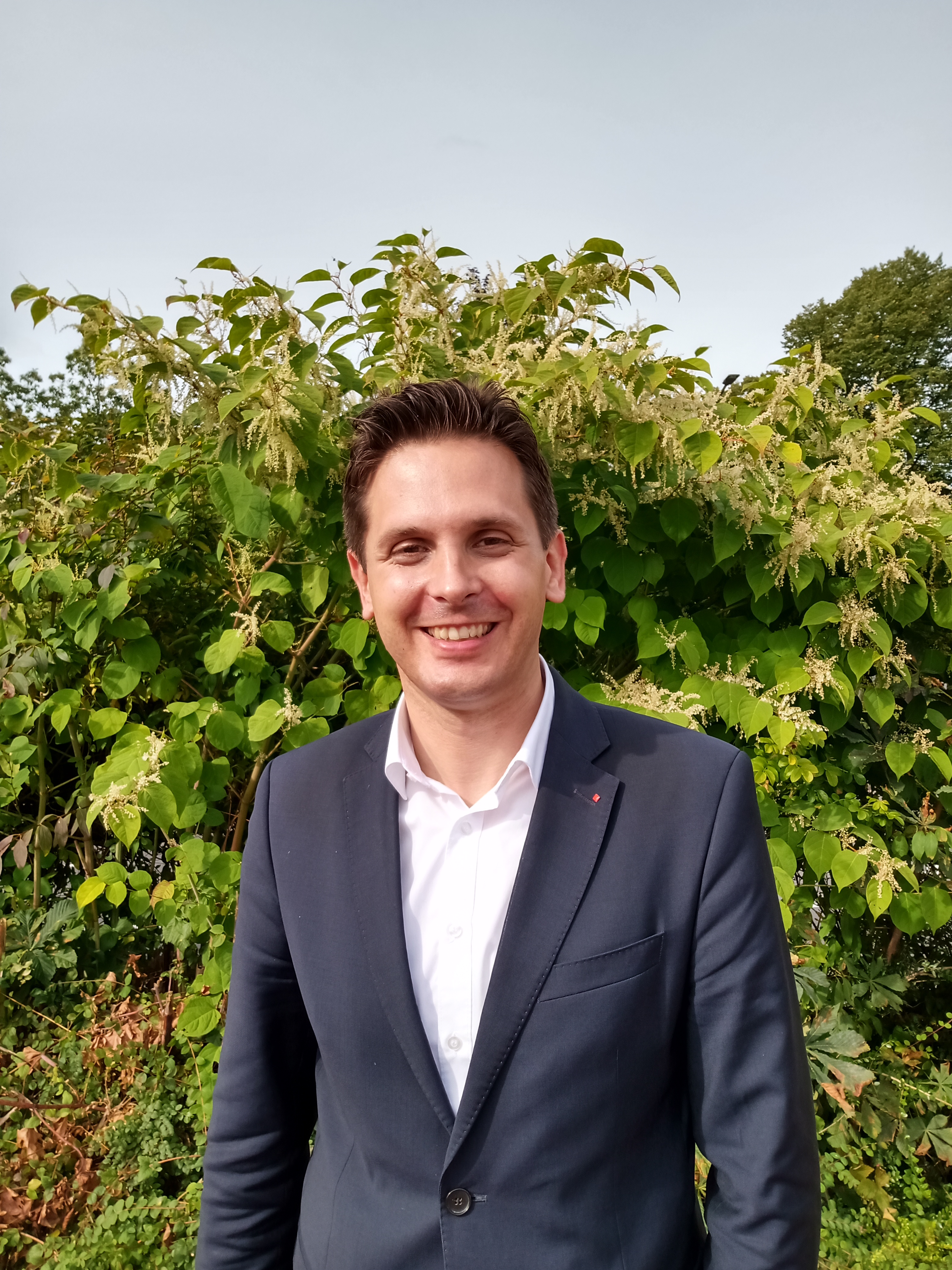
Timo Shisanowski

Timo Schisanowski (born 27 August 1981) is a German politician for the Social Democratic Party (SPD) who served as a member of the Bundestag from 2021 to 2025.

== Life and politics ==
Schisanowski was born 1981 in the West German city of Hagen and studied law.

Schisanowski became member of the Bundestag in 2021.
