= Candidates of the 2021 German federal election =

This is a list of candidates for the 2021 German federal election.

There were 6,211 candidates in total. Of these, 1,284 ran only in the 299 single-member constituencies while 2,851 ran only on party lists. 2,076 candidates ran in both a constituency and on a party list.

== Competing parties ==
A total of 47 parties and lists were approved to run in the 2021 federal election, including the seven which won seats in the 19th Bundestag. Of these, 40 ran party lists in at least one state, while 7 ran only direct candidates. Further, 196 independent candidates ran in the various direct constituencies.

In the table below, green shading indicates that the party ran a list in the indicated state. The number in each box indicates how many direct candidates the party ran in the indicated state.

Party	State															
Party	BW	BY	BE	BB	HB	HH	HE	MV	NI	NW	RP	SL	SN	ST	SH	TH
Christian Democratic Union of Germany (CDU)	38	–	12	10	2	6	22	6	30	64	15	4	16	9	11	8
Social Democratic Party of Germany (SPD)	38	46	12	10	2	6	22	6	30	64	15	4	16	9	11	8
Alternative for Germany (AfD)	38	44	12	10	2	6	22	6	27	63	15	4	16	9	11	8
Free Democratic Party (FDP)	38	46	12	10	2	6	22	6	30	64	15	4	16	9	11	8
The Left (DIE LINKE)	38	45	12	10	2	6	22	6	30	64	14	4	16	9	11	8
Alliance 90/The Greens (GRÜNE)	38	46	12	10	2	6	22	6	30	64	15	4	16	9	11	8
Christian Social Union in Bavaria (CSU)	–	46	–	–	–	–	–	–	–	–	–	–	–	–	–	–
Free Voters (FREIE WÄHLER)	38	46	7	9	2	5	21	6	22	57	15	4	12	8	11	6
Die PARTEI	33	31	12	9	2	2	9	2	8	52	10	4	11	2	7	7
Human Environment Animal Protection Party (Tierschutzpartei)	8	6	12	1	1	–	–	3	9	3	3	–	–	1	–	–
National Democratic Party of Germany (NPD)	–	1	–	–	–	4	–	–	–	–	–	–	–	–	–	–
Pirate Party Germany (PIRATEN)	3	6	6	5	1	2	4	3	8	4	1	–	3	–	–	1
Ecological Democratic Party (ÖDP)	16	46	10	7	2	5	–	–	5	2	9	4	13	1	–	4
V-Partei^{3} – Party for Change, Vegetarians and Vegans (V-Partei^{3})	1	11	–	–	1	–	–	–	1	1	–	–	2	–	1	–
Democracy in Motion (DiB)	6	–	–	–	–	–	–	–	–	–	–	–	–	–	–	–
Bavaria Party (BP)	–	24	–	–	–	–	–	–	–	–	–	–	–	–	–	–
Animal Protection Alliance (Tierschutzallianz)	–	–	–	–	–	–	–	–	–	–	–	–	–	2	–	–
Marxist–Leninist Party of Germany (MLPD)	22	9	7	1	2	6	5	4	6	31	1	1	4	2	2	8
Party for Health Research (Gesundheitsforschung)	–	–	2	–	–	–	–	–	–	–	–	–	1	–	–	–
German Communist Party (DKP)	–	–	–	4	–	–	1	–	2	12	1	–	–	–	3	–
Human World (MENSCHLICHE WELT)	1	–	1	–	–	–	–	–	–	–	–	–	–	–	–	–
The Greys – For all Generations (Die Grauen)	–	–	1	–	–	–	–	–	–	–	–	–	–	–	–	–
Civil Rights Movement Solidarity (BüSo)	2	5	–	–	–	–	1	–	–	–	–	–	1	–	–	–
Party of Humanists (Die Humanisten)	10	3	3	1	2	–	1	–	1	1	1	–	3	–	–	–
Garden Party (Gartenpartei)	–	–	–	–	–	–	–	–	–	–	–	–	–	1	–	–
The Urbans. A HipHop Party (du.)	–	2	1	–	–	–	–	–	–	–	–	–	–	–	3	–
Socialist Equality Party, Fourth International (SGP)	–	–	–	–	–	–	–	–	–	–	–	–	–	–	–	–
Grassroots Democratic Party of Germany (dieBasis)	36	46	11	10	2	6	21	5	27	60	15	4	16	9	11	7
Alliance C – Christians for Germany (Bündnis C)	1	2	–	–	–	–	4	–	–	2	–	–	2	–	–	–
The III. Path (III. Weg)	–	–	–	–	–	–	–	–	–	–	–	–	1	–	–	–
Citizens' Movement for Progress and Change (BÜRGERBEWEGUNG)	3	–	–	–	–	–	–	–	–	–	–	–	–	–	–	–
The Pinks/Alliance 21 (BÜNDNIS21)	–	–	1	–	–	–	1	–	–	–	–	–	–	–	–	–
European Party LOVE (LIEBE)	–	–	–	–	–	–	–	–	–	1	–	–	–	–	–	–
Liberal Conservative Reformers (LKR)	3	7	10	–	–	1	1	–	8	7	3	–	4	–	6	2
Party for Progress (PdF)	–	–	–	–	–	–	–	–	–	–	–	–	–	–	–	–
Lobbyists for Children (LfK)	–	–	–	–	–	–	–	–	–	–	–	–	–	–	–	–
South Schleswig Voters' Association (SSW) (Note: The South Schleswig Voters' Association is a recognised minority party representing the Danish and Frisian minorities of Southern Schleswig, and is exempt from the 5% electoral threshold in Germany.)	–	–	–	–	–	–	–	–	–	–	–	–	–	–	5	–
Team Todenhöfer – The Justice Party (Team Todenhöfer)	–	2	1	–	–	–	–	–	–	–	–	–	–	–	–	–
Independents for Citizen-oriented Democracy (UNABHÄNGIGE)	–	2	–	3	–	–	1	1	–	2	2	–	–	–	–	–
Volt Germany (Volt)	13	12	2	1	1	3	5	–	–	15	10	–	–	–	2	–
From now... Democracy by Referendum (Volksabstimmung)	–	–	–	–	–	–	–	–	–	–	2	–	–	–	–	–
Bergpartei, die "ÜberPartei" (B*)	–	–	1	–	–	–	–	–	–	–	–	–	–	–	–	–
The Others (sonstige)	–	–	1	–	–	–	–	–	–	–	–	–	–	–	–	–
Family Party of Germany (FAMILIE)	–	–	–	1	–	–	–	–	–	–	–	–	–	–	–	–
Grey Panthers (Graue Panther)	–	–	–	–	–	–	1	1	–	2	2	–	–	–	–	1
Climate List Baden-Württemberg (KlimalisteBW)	7	–	–	–	–	–	–	–	–	–	–	–	–	–	–	–
Thuringian Homeland Party (THP)	–	–	–	–	–	–	–	–	–	–	–	–	–	–	–	1
Independents and voter groups	15	26	9	18	–	2	15	2	21	31	22	1	22	7	2	3
Party	BW	BY	BE	BB	HB	HH	HE	MV	NI	NW	RP	SL	SN	ST	SH	TH
Total constituencies	38	46	12	10	2	6	22	6	30	64	15	4	16	9	11	8

== By state ==
In the tables below, green shading indicates that the candidate was an incumbent.

=== Schleswig-Holstein ===
#	Constituency	CDU/CSU	SPD	GRÜNE	AfD	FDP	LINKE	Other
1	Flensburg – Schleswig	Petra Nicolaisen	Franziska Brzezicha	Robert Habeck	Jan Petersen-Brendel	Christoph Anastasiadis	Katrine Hoop	Arne Olaf Jöhnk (FW); Marko Wölbing (dieBasis); Dariush Khorasgani (du.); Uwe Christiansen (LKR); Stefan Seidler (SSW)
2	Nordfriesland – Dithmarschen Nord	Astrid Damerow	Jens Peter Jensen	Denise Loop	Andrej Clasen	Gyde Jensen	Hartmut Jensen	Traymont Wilhelmi (FW); Sandor Stolz (dieBasis); Axel Frey (LKR); Sybilla Nitsch (SSW)
3	Steinburg – Dithmarschen Süd	Mark Helfrich	Karin Thissen	Ingrid Nestle	Jan Voigt	Wolfgang Kubicki	Michael Schilke	Jens Köster (FW); Stefan Habermann (dieBasis); Mark Riemann (LKR); Robert Pilgrim (V-Partei3)
4	Rendsburg-Eckernförde	Johann Wadephul	Sönke Rix	Jakob Blasel	Gereon Bollmann	Christine Aschenberg-Dugnus	Hauke Schultze	Nils-H. Saul (PARTEI); Bärbel Kahlund (FW); Holger Thiesen (dieBasis); Maylis Roßberg (SSW)
5	Kiel	Thomas Stritzl	Mathias Stein	Luise Amtsberg	Eike Reimers	Maximilian Mordhorst	Lorenz Gösta Beutin	Florian Wrobel (PARTEI); Christian Görtz (FW); Karin Zan Bi (MLPD); Björn Michel (dieBasis); Barbara Müller (DKP); Paula Abramik (du.); Marcel Schmidt (SSW); Simon Wadehn (Volt)
6	Plön – Neumünster	Melanie Bernstein	Kristian Klinck	Martin Drees	Alexis Giersch	Gunnar Schulz	Gabi Gschwind-Wiese	Jana Käding (PARTEI); Manfred Koch (FW); Karina Reiß (dieBasis); Jürgen Joost (LKR)
7	Pinneberg	Michael von Abercron	Ralf Stegner	Jens Herrndorff	Joachim Schneider	Philipp Rösch	Cornelia Möhring	Erkan Inak (PARTEI); Kathrin Arbeck (FW); Sabine Lehmann (dieBasis); Rainer Urban (LKR); Claudia Edmund (SSW)
8	Segeberg – Stormarn-Mitte	Gero Storjohann	Bengt Bergt	Nils Bollenbach	Sven Wendorf	Jan Schupp	Malin Schultz	Beate Schreiber (PARTEI); Julia Glagau (FW); Claudia Westphal (dieBasis)
9	Ostholstein – Stormarn-Nord	Ingo Gädechens	Bettina Hagedorn	Jakob Brunken	Uwe Witt	Jörg Hansen	Susanne Spethmann	David Gutzeit (FW); Michael Metzig (dieBasis); Mergim Schlüter (Ind.)
10	Herzogtum Lauenburg – Stormarn-Süd	Thomas Peters	Nina Scheer	Konstantin von Notz	Wiebke Neumann	Martin Turowski	Christoph Hinrichs	Arne Schönfelder (PARTEI); Christian Runge (FW); Matthias Micklich (dieBasis); Peter Schlüter (DKP)
11	Lübeck	Claudia Schmidtke	Tim Klüssendorf	Bruno Hönel	David Jenniches	Heike Stegemann	Emil Tankacheyev	Alexander Schacht (PARTEI); Gregor Voht (FW); Lüder Möller (MLPD); Uta Kemper (dieBasis); Wilfried Link (DKP); Jennifer Wobusa (du.); Lutz Nielsen (LKR); Fabio Sánchez Copano (Volt); Thorsten Kerkhoff (Ind.)

CDU list
#	Candidate	Constituency
1	Johann Wadephul	Rendsburg-Eckernförde
2	Astrid Damerow	Nordfriesland – Dithmarschen Nord
3	Ingo Gädechens	Ostholstein – Stormarn-Nord
4	Petra Nicolaisen	Flensburg – Schleswig
5	Gero Storjohann	Segeberg – Stormarn-Mitte
6	Melanie Bernstein	Plön – Neumünster
7	Mark Helfrich	Steinburg – Dithmarschen Süd
8	Claudia Schmidtke	Lübeck
9	Michael von Abercron	Pinneberg
10	Juliane Müller-Weigel	
11	Thomas Peters	Herzogtum Lauenburg – Stormarn-Süd
12	Bettina Spechtmeyer-Högel	
13	Thomas Stritzl	Kiel
14	Dagmar Steiner	
15	Timo Gaarz	
16	Ulrike Stentzler	
17	Leif Erik Bodin	
18	Sabine Mues	
19	Lars Kuhlmann	
20	Britta Röpke-Modenbach	
21	Henri Schmidt	
22	Stefanie Rönnau	
23	Nicolas Sölter	
24	Lena Grützmacher	
25	Tom Matzen	
26	Kerstin Seyfurt	
27	Jens Junkersdorf	
28	Vivien Claussen	
29	Marten Waller	
30	Christiane Ostermeyer	
31	Niklas Schwab	
32	Bärbel Feddersen	
33	Kole Gjoka	
34	Jasmin Anneliese Krause	
35	Anna Ruth Weidler	
36	Sven Voß	
37	Annette Glage	
38	Daniel Herzberger	

SPD list
#	Candidate	Constituency
1	Sönke Rix	Rendsburg-Eckernförde
2	Nina Scheer	Herzogtum Lauenburg – Stormarn-Süd
3	Ralf Stegner	Pinneberg
4	Bettina Hagedorn	Ostholstein – Stormarn-Nord
5	Tim Klüssendorf	Lübeck
6	Franziska Brzezicha	Flensburg – Schleswig
7	Mathias Stein	Kiel
8	Karin Thissen	Steinburg – Dithmarschen Süd
9	Bengt Bergt	Segeberg – Stormarn-Mitte
10	Dorothea Siemers	
11	Jens Peter Jensen	Nordfriesland – Dithmarschen Nord
12	Christiane Buhl	
13	Kristian Klinck	Plön – Neumünster
14	Aylin Cerrah	
15	Felix Ferber	
16	Katrin Fedrowitz	
17	Mats Marti Hansen	
18	Martina Claussen	
19	Tobias Schloo	
20	Miriam Huppermann	

Green list
#	Candidate	Constituency
1	Luise Amtsberg	Kiel
2	Robert Habeck	Flensburg – Schleswig
3	Ingrid Nestle	Steinburg – Dithmarschen Süd
4	Konstantin von Notz	Herzogtum Lauenburg – Stormarn-Süd
5	Denise Loop	Nordfriesland – Dithmarschen Nord
6	Bruno Hönel	Lübeck
7	Kerstin Mock-Hofeditz	
8	Jakob Blasel	Rendsburg-Eckernförde
9	Marlene Langholz-Kaiser	
10	Jens Herrndorff	Pinneberg
11	Jessica Kordouni	
12	Jakob Brunken	Ostholstein – Stormarn-Nord
13	Ulrike Täck	
14	Nils Bollenbach	Segeberg – Stormarn-Mitte
15	Nadine Mai	
16	Martin Drees	Plön – Neumünster
17	Uta Röpcke	
18	Dirk Kock-Rohwer	
19	Nelly Waldeck	
20	Luca Jan Köpping	
21	Hannah Wolf	
22	Lydia Johanna Rudow	
23	Hildegard Bedarff	
24	Jonathan Morsch	
25	Dorothee Schnitzler	

AfD list
#	Candidate	Constituency
1	Uwe Witt	Ostholstein – Stormarn-Nord
2	Gereon Bollmann	Rendsburg-Eckernförde
3	Kerstin Przygodda	
4	Wiebke Neumann	Herzogtum Lauenburg – Stormarn-Süd
5	Eike Julius Reimers	Kiel
6	Joachim Rudi Schneider	Pinneberg
7	Martina Dibbern	
8	Sven Wendorf	Segeberg – Stormarn-Mitte

FDP list
#	Candidate	Constituency
1	Wolfgang Kubicki	Steinburg – Dithmarschen Süd
2	Gyde Jensen	Nordfriesland – Dithmarschen Nord
3	Christine Aschenberg-Dugnus	Rendsburg-Eckernförde
4	Maximilian Mordhorst	Kiel
5	Philpp Rösch	Pinneberg
6	Christoph Anastasiadis	Flensburg – Schleswig
7	Heike Stegemann	Lübeck
8	Martin Turowski	Herzogtum Lauenburg – Stormarn-Süd
9	Gunnar Schulz	Plön – Neumünster
10	Jan Schupp	Segeberg – Stormarn-Mitte
11	Tobias Heisig	

Left list
#	Candidate	Constituency
1	Cornelia Möhring	Pinneberg
2	Lorenz Gösta Beutin	Kiel
3	Katrine Hoop	Flensburg – Schleswig
4	Susanne Spethmann	Ostholstein – Stormarn-Nord
5	Sophie Bachmann	
6	Maximilian Reimers	

=== Mecklenburg-Vorpommern ===
#	Constituency	CDU/CSU	SPD	GRÜNE	AfD	FDP	LINKE	Other
12	Schwerin – Ludwigslust-Parchim I – Nordwestmecklenburg I	Dietrich Monstadt	Reem Alaball-Radovan	Claudia Tamm	Steffen Beckmann	Yannik Meffert	Ina Latendorf	Alrik Stoffers (PARTEI); Anja Klähn (FW); Bert Beckmann (MLPD); Eberhard Gericke (dieBasis); Karsten Jagau (Piraten)
13	Ludwigslust-Parchim II – Nordwestmecklenburg II – Landkreis Rostock I	Simone Borchardt	Frank Junge	Martin Mölau	Andreas-Michael Mrachacz	Daniel Bohl	Judith Keller	Torsten Neitzel (FW); Stephanie Zajonc (dieBasis); Rainer Löwe (Ind.)
14	Rostock – Landkreis Rostock II	Peter Stein	Katrin Zschau	Andreas Tesche	Tobias Pontow	Hagen Reinhold	Dietmar Bartsch	Seraphine Jörn (Tierschutz); Christine Dubberke (FW); Eric Dunst (MLPD); Susanne Kreft (dieBasis); Jan-Peter Rühmann (Piraten)
15	Vorpommern-Rügen – Vorpommern-Greifswald I	Georg Günther	Anna Kassautzki	Claudia Müller	Leif-Erik Holm	Sebastian Adler	Kerstin Kassner	Robert Gabel (Tierschutz); Mark Pistor (PARTEI); Heidelind Holthusen (FW); Karl-Heinz Schulze (MLPD); Sylvio Schmeller (dieBasis); Friedrich Smyra (Piraten)
16	Mecklenburgische Seenplatte I – Vorpommern-Greifswald II	Philipp Amthor	Erik von Malottki	Katharina Horn	Enrico Komning	Christian Bartelt	Toni Jaschinski	Anja Hübner (Tierschutz); Matthias Andiel (FW); Wolfgang Wodarg (dieBasis); Sören Krüger (Ind.); Sophie Maus (Ind.)
17	Mecklenburgische Seenplatte II – Landkreis Rostock III	Stephan Bunge	Johannes Arlt	Falk Jagszent	Ulrike Schielke-Ziesing	Tobias Schubert	Amina Kanew	Klaus-Dieter Gabbert (FW); Lena Goltz (MLPD)

CDU list
#	Candidate	Constituency
1	Philipp Amthor	Mecklenburgische Seenplatte I – Vorpommern-Greifswald II
2	Dietrich Monstadt	Schwerin – Ludwigslust-Parchim I – Nordwestmecklenburg I
3	Simone Borchardt	Ludwigslust-Parchim II – Nordwestmecklenburg II – Landkreis Rostock I
4	Georg Günther	Vorpommern-Rügen – Vorpommern-Greifswald I
5	Stephan Bunge	Mecklenburgische Seenplatte II – Landkreis Rostock III
6	Peter Stein	Rostock – Landkreis Rostock II
7	Theresa Schöler	
8	Hannelore Glagla	

SPD list
#	Candidate	Constituency
1	Frank Junge	Ludwigslust-Parchim II – Nordwestmecklenburg II – Landkreis Rostock I
2	Anna Kassautzki	Vorpommern-Rügen – Vorpommern-Greifswald I
3	Erik von Malottki	Mecklenburgische Seenplatte I – Vorpommern-Greifswald II
4	Katrin Zschau	Rostock – Landkreis Rostock II
5	Johannes Arlt	Mecklenburgische Seenplatte II – Landkreis Rostock III
6	Reem Alabali-Radovan	Schwerin – Ludwigslust-Parchim I – Nordwestmecklenburg I
7	Christian Reinke	
8	Lena Gerber	
9	Johannes Barsch	
10	Peggy Lehm	
11	Janna Schulz	

Green list
#	Candidate	Constituency
1	Claudia Müller	Vorpommern-Rügen – Vorpommern-Greifswald I
2	Katharina Horn	Mecklenburgische Seenplatte I – Vorpommern-Greifswald II
3	Regina Dorfmann	
4	Andreas Tesche	Rostock – Landkreis Rostock II

AfD list
#	Candidate	Constituency
1	Leif-Erik Holm	Vorpommern-Rügen – Vorpommern-Greifswald I
2	Enrico Komning	Mecklenburgische Seenplatte I – Vorpommern-Greifswald II
3	Ulrike Schielke-Ziesing	Mecklenburgische Seenplatte II – Landkreis Rostock III
4	Tobias Pontow	Rostock – Landkreis Rostock II
5	Roswita Katscher	
6	Steffen Beckmann	Schwerin – Ludwigslust-Parchim I – Nordwestmecklenburg I

FDP list
#	Candidate	Constituency
1	Hagen Reinhold	Rostock – Landkreis Rostock II
2	Christian Bartelt	Mecklenburgische Seenplatte I – Vorpommern-Greifswald II
3	Sebastian Adler	Vorpommern-Rügen – Vorpommern-Greifswald I
4	Daniel Bohl	Ludwigslust-Parchim II – Nordwestmecklenburg II – Landkreis Rostock I
5	Katja Wolter	
6	Bernd Lange	
7	Yannik Meffert	Schwerin – Ludwigslust-Parchim I – Nordwestmecklenburg I
8	Tobias Schubert	Mecklenburgische Seenplatte II – Landkreis Rostock III

Left list
#	Candidate	Constituency
1	Dietmar Bartsch	Rostock – Landkreis Rostock II
2	Ina Latendorf	Schwerin – Ludwigslust-Parchim I – Nordwestmecklenburg I
3	Amina Kanew	Mecklenburgische Seenplatte II – Landkreis Rostock III
4	Toni Jaschinski	Mecklenburgische Seenplatte I – Vorpommern-Greifswald II
5	Judith Keller	Ludwigslust-Parchim II – Nordwestmecklenburg II – Landkreis Rostock I
6	Lajos Orban	

=== Hamburg ===
#	Constituency	CDU/CSU	SPD	GRÜNE	AfD	FDP	LINKE	Other
18	Hamburg-Mitte	Christoph de Vries	Falko Droßmann	Manuel Muja	Nicole Jordan	James Blum	David Stoop	Arne Ihlenfeld (PARTEI); Ralf Relmer (FW); Sebastian Bollien (ÖDP); Lennart Schwarzbach (NPD); Joachim Griesbaum (MLPD); Dennis Sommer (dieBasis); Odin Janoske-Kizildag (Ind.)
19	Hamburg-Altona	Marcus Weinberg	Matthias Bartke	Linda Heltmann	Bernd Baumann	Fabrice Hernicl	Cansu Özdemir	Daniel Meincke (FW); Kalotta Ahrens (ÖDP); Christian Kölle (MLPD); Ulrike Zens (dieBasis); Frieder Kirsch (Piraten); Bérangère Bultheel (Ind.)
20	Hamburg-Eimsbüttel	Rüdiger Kruse	Niels Annen	Till Steffen	Marc Cremer-Thursby	Carolin Hümpel	Żaklin Nastić	Martin Sommer (PARTEI); Alexander Feltz (FW); Hannes Lincke (ÖDP); Uwe Wagner (MLPD); Inke Meyer (dieBasis); Sören Horn (Volt)
21	Hamburg-Nord	Christoph Ploß	Dorothee Martin	Katharina Beck	Benjamin Mennerich	Robert Bläsing	Deniz Celik	Almut Becker (FW); Ingo Stawitz (NPD); Susanne Bader (MLPD); Jörn Böttcher (dieBasis); Steffan Nethe (LKR)
22	Hamburg-Wandsbek	Franziska Hoppermann	Aydan Özoğuz	Daniel Grimm	Dietmar Wagner	Wieland Schinnenburg	Johan Graßhoff	Matthias Deutsch (ÖDP); Helmut Saß (NPD); Renate Dohrn (MLPD); Michael Stein (dieBasis); Arthur Kaiser (Piraten); Luca Beitz (Volt)
23	Hamburg-Bergedorf – Harburg	Uwe Schneider	Metin Hakverdi	Manuel Sarrazin	Olga Petersen	Sonja Jacobsen	Stephan Jarsch	Thomas Lindner (FW); Manuela Körlin (ÖDP); Manfred Dammann (NPD); Narziss Nianur (MLPD); Katja Schäfer (dieBasis); Jan-Martin Thoden (Volt)

CDU list
#	Candidate	Constituency
1	Christoph Ploß	Hamburg-Nord
2	Franziska Hoppermann	Hamburg-Wandsbek
3	Christoph de Vries	Hamburg-Mitte
4	Rüdiger Kruse	Hamburg-Eimsbüttel
5	Anke Frieling	
6	Uwe Schneider	Hamburg-Bergedorf – Harburg
7	Dennis Gladiator	
8	Herlind Gundelach	
9	Birgit Stöver	
10	Katharina Schuwalski	
11	Antonia-Katharina Goldner	
12	Ali Toprak	
13	Sybille Möller-Fiedler	

SPD list
#	Candidate	Constituency
1	Aydan Özoğuz	Hamburg-Wandsbek
2	Niels Annen	Hamburg-Eimsbüttel
3	Dorothee Martin	Hamburg-Nord
4	Matthias Bartke	Hamburg-Altona
5	Ronja Schmager	
6	Metin Hakverdi	Hamburg-Bergedorf – Harburg
7	Meryem Celikkol	
8	Christian Bernzen	
9	Dafina Berisha	
10	Carsten Gerloff	
11	Anja Quast	
12	Gabriele Dobusch	

Green list
#	Candidate	Constituency
1	Katharina Beck	Hamburg-Nord
2	Till Steffen	Hamburg-Eimsbüttel
3	Emilia Fester	
4	Manuel Sarrazin	Hamburg-Bergedorf – Harburg
5	Linda Heitmann	Hamburg-Altona
6	Manuel Muja	Hamburg-Mitte
7	Phyliss Demirel	
8	Katja Husen	
9	Christa Möller-Metzger	
10	Michael Gwosdz	
11	Sonja Lattwesen	
12	Clara Goldmann	

AfD list
#	Candidate	Constituency
1	Bernd Baumann	Hamburg-Altona
2	Olga Petersen	Hamburg-Bergedorf – Harburg
3	Nicole Jordan	Hamburg-Mitte
4	Dietmar Wagner	Hamburg-Wandsbek
5	Benjamin Mennerich	Hamburg-Nord

FDP list
#	Candidate	Constituency
1	Michael Kruse	
2	Ria Schröder	
3	Andreas Moring	
4	Cetin Akbulut	
5	Robert Bläsing	Hamburg-Nord
6	Carolin Hümpel	Hamburg-Eimsbüttel
7	James Blum	Hamburg-Mitte
8	Magnus Mayer	
9	Barnabas Crocker	
10	Jutta Krümmer	

Left list
#	Candidate	Constituency
1	Żaklin Nastić	Hamburg-Eimsbüttel
2	Deniz Celik	Hamburg-Nord
3	Nuran Sarica	
4	Johan Graßhoff	Hamburg-Wandsbek
5	Wiebke Haßelbusch	

=== Lower Saxony ===
#	Constituency	CDU/CSU	SPD	GRÜNE	AfD	FDP	LINKE	Other
24	Aurich – Emden	Joachim Kleen	Johann Saathoff	Stefan Maas		Sarah Buss	Friedrich-Bernd Albers	Diedrich Kleen (Tierschutz); Detlev Krüger (FW); David Frerichs (Ind.); Anton Lenz (Ind.)
25	Unterems	Gitta Connemann	Anja Troff-Schaffarzyk	Julian Pahlke	Holger Kühnlenz	Ferhat Asi	Kai Jesiek	Rafael Gil Brand (dieBasis); Siegfried Balzer (Ind.)
26	Friesland – Wilhelmshaven – Wittmund	Anne Janssen	Siemtje Möller	Sina Beckmann	Joachim Wundrak	Hendrik Theemann	Hans-Henning Adler	Andreas Tönjes (PARTEI); Andreas Lang (FW); Carsten Zimmer (MLPD); Andrea Henning (dieBasis)
27	Oldenburg – Ammerland	Stephan Albani	Dennis Rohde	Susanne Menge	Andreas Paul	Daniel Rüdel	Amira Mohamed Ali	Nicole Striess (FW); Holger Lubitz (Piraten); Michael Krüger (ÖDP); Johanna Jensen (MLPD); Werner Berends (dieBasis); Jens Ahrends (LKR)
28	Delmenhorst – Wesermarsch – Oldenburg-Land	Philipp Albrecht	Susanne Mittag	Christina-Johanne Schröder	Adam Golkontt	Christian Dürr	Christian Suhr	Kevin Laukenings (PARTEI); Dieter Holsten (FW); Frank-Rüdiger Halt (dieBasis); Thomas Rappers (LKR)
29	Cuxhaven – Stade II	Enak Ferlemann	Daniel Schneider	Stefan Wenzel	Hans Kappelt	Günter Wichert	Dietmar Buttler	Dirk Sieling (PARTEI); Susanne Berghoff (Tierschutz); Claudia Theis (FW); Peter von der Geest (dieBasis)
30	Stade I – Rotenburg II	Oliver Grundmann	Kai Koeser	Claas Goldenstein	Marie-Thérèse Kaiser	Steven Hermeling	Klemens Kowalski	Richard Klaus (Piraten); Kai Bartos (dieBasis)
31	Mittelems	Albert Stegemann	Daniela De Ridder	Everhard Hüseman	Danny Meiners	Jens Beeck	Helmuth Hoffmann	Mario Kehl (dieBasis)
32	Cloppenburg – Vechta	Silvia Breher	Alexander Bartz	Tanja Meyer	Waldemar Herdt	Carolin Abeln	Tom Dobrowolski	Melanie Lorenz (dieBasis)
33	Diepholz – Nienburg I	Axel Knoerig	Peggy Schierenbeck	Sylvia Holste-Hagen	Alfons Muhle	Jan Hinderks	Jürgen Abelmann	Detlev Pigors (dieBasis); Rüdiger Gums (Ind.)
34	Osterholz – Verden	Andreas Mattfeldt	Michael Harjes	Lena Gumnior		Gero Hocker	Mizgin Ciftci	Dominique Paetz (FW); Anton Körner (dieBasis)
35	Rotenburg I – Heidekreis	Carsten Büttinghaus	Lars Klingbeil	Michael Kopatz	Volker Körlin	Alexander Künzle	Kathrin Otte	Günter Scheunemann (FW)
36	Harburg	Michael Grosse-Brömer	Svenja Stadler	Nadja Weippert	Henning Schwieger	Nino Ruschmeyer	Joachim Kotteck	Mona Jonas-Tadjik (Tierschutz); Willy Klingenberg (FW); Christian Bahr (dieBasis); Hans-Christian Schröder (LKR)
37	Lüchow-Dannenberg – Lüneburg	Eckhard Pols	Jakob Blankenburg	Julia Verlinden	Armin-Paulus Hampel	Edzard Schmidt-Jortzig	Thorben Peters	Meike Hilbeck (PARTEI); Volker Heinecke (FW); Tristan Großkopf (MLPD); Sören Köppen (dieBasis); Fronke Gerken (LKR)
38	Osnabrück-Land	André Berghegger	Anke Hennig	Filiz Polat	Roland Lapinskas	Matthias Seestern-Pauly	Swen Adams	Josef Vagedes (FW); Jürgen Wehlburg (dieBasis)
39	Stadt Osnabrück	Mathias Middelberg	Manuel Gava	Thomas Klein	Florian Meyer	Nemir Ali	Heidi Reichinnek	Joachim Bigus (DKP); Maria Haunhorst (dieBasis)
40	Nienburg II – Schaumburg	Maik Beermann	Marja-Liisa Völlers	Katja Keul	Thorsten Althaus	Anton van der Born	Lennart Dahms	Gabriele Tautz (Tierschutz); Sabine Hartung (FW); Rainer Schippers (dieBasis); Heinz Weich (Ind.)
41	Stadt Hannover I	Maximilian Oppelt	Adis Ahmetovic	Swantje Michaelsen	Jörn König	Katharina Wieking	Hans-Herbert Ullrich	Jens Bolm (PARTEI); Corinna Günther (Tierschutz); Ronald Rüdiger (FW); Reiner Budnick (Piraten); Iko Schneider (ÖDP); Anke Nierstenhöfer (MLPD); Bader Karl-Heinz (dieBasis)
42	Stadt Hannover II	Diana Rieck-Vogt	Yasmin Fahimi	Sven-Christian Kindler	Reinhard Hirche	Knut Gerschau	Parwaneh Bokah	Juli Klippert (PARTEI); Christian Wulff (Tierschutz); Andreas Hey (FW); Thomas Ganskow (Piraten); Käthe Kleffel (MLPD); Niels Heinrich (dieBasis); Eduard Kirschmann (PDV)
43	Hannover-Land I	Hendrik Hoppenstedt	Rebecca Schamber	Jens Palandt	Dietmar Friedhoff	Grigorios Aggelidis	Michael Braedt	Ýr Langhorst (PARTEI); Jens Klingebiel (Tierschutz); Olaf Engel (Piraten); Kober Inessa (MLPD); Iris Krobjinski (dieBasis); Mirco Zschoch (LKR)
44	Celle – Uelzen	Henning Otte	Dirk-Ulrich Mende	Markus Jordan	Thomas Ehrhorn	Anja Schulz	Christoph Podstawa	Philip Siebold (FW); Andrew Schlüter (MLPD)
45	Gifhorn – Peine	Ingrid Pahlmann	Hubertus Heil	Henrik Werner	Stefan Marzischewski-Drewes	Thomas Schellhorn	Andreas Mantzke	Marika Orend (Tierschutz); Wolfgang Gemba (FW); Marita Draheim (dieBasis); Nadine Schladebeck (LKR); Angela Kunick (Ind.); Ute Neumann (Ind.)
46	Hameln-Pyrmont – Holzminden	Mareike Wulf	Johannes Schraps	Helge Limburg	Delia Klages	Moritz Mönkemeyer	Stephan Marquardt	Carsten Schürmann (FW); Andreas Janus (dieBasis)
47	Hannover-Land II	Tilman Kuban	Matthias Miersch	Simone Meyer	Dirk Brandes	Nadin Zaya	Thorsten Kuhn	Lisa-Marie Rosien (PARTEI); Claudia Klitz (Tierschutz); Moritz Krienke (FW); Uwe Kopec (Piraten); Eva-Maria Görres (dieBasis); Wolfgang Göller (Ind.)
48	Hildesheim	Ute Bertram	Bernd Westphal	Ottmar von Holtz	Frank Rinck	Henrik Jacobs	Rita Krüger	Heinrich Kalvelage (FW); Phil Höfer (Piraten); Henry Kucz (ÖDP); Otwin Herzig (MLPD); Michael Fritsch (dieBasis); Reinhard Wieczorek (Ind.)
49	Salzgitter – Wolfenbüttel	Holger Bormann	Dunja Kreiser	Claudia Bei der Wieden	Thomas Günther	Max Weitemeier	Victor Perli	Günter Gehmert (FW); Jens Golland (Piraten); Paul Deutsch (MLPD); Volker Eyssen (dieBasis); Christiane Jagau (Ind.)
50	Braunschweig	Carsten Müller	Christos Pantazis	Margaux Erdmann	Frank Weber	Anikó Glogowski-Merten	Alper Özgür	Eike Jankun (FW); Anna Wolters (V-Partei3); Klaus Arndt (ÖDP); Philipp Schwartz (MLPD); Christoph Bedürftig (dieBasis); Christian Helck (LKR); Erdmann Gust (Ind.); Peter Rosenbaum (Ind.); Andreas Wolter (Ind.)
51	Helmstedt – Wolfsburg	Andreas Weber	Falko Mohrs	Frank Bsirske	Stephanie Scharfenberg	Kristin Krumm	Bernd Mex	Frank Schrödl (FW); Dora Weigl (ÖDP); Johann Hönig (Ind.); Peter Kunick (Ind.); Wilfried Wiesenthal (Ind.)
52	Goslar – Northeim – Osterode	Roy Kühne	Frauke Heiligenstadt	Karoline Otte	Jens Kestner	Jan Schwede	Eva Brunnemann	Christian Warzecha (FW); Jürgen Schäuble-Leopold (MLPD); Janine Reinecke (dieBasis)
53	Göttingen	Fritz Güntzler	Andreas Philippi	Jürgen Trittin		Konstantin Kuhle	Thomas Goes	Kay Langemeier (MLPD); Gabriele Winkel (dieBasis); Olaf Töpperwien (LKR); Manfred Sohn (Ind.)

CDU list
#	Candidate	Constituency
1	Hendrik Hoppenstedt	Hannover-Land I
2	Michael Grosse-Brömer	Harburg
3	Gitta Connemann	Unterems
4	Mathias Middelberg	Stadt Osnabrück
5	Enak Ferlemann	Cuxhaven – Stade II
6	Anne Janssen	Friesland – Wilhelmshaven – Wittmund
7	Tilman Kuban	Hannover-Land II
8	Carsten Müller	Braunschweig
9	Mareike Wulf	Hameln-Pyrmont – Holzminden
10	Fritz Güntzler	Göttingen
11	Stephan Albani	Oldenburg – Ammerland
12	Ingrid Pahlmann	Gifhorn – Peine
13	Henning Otte	Celle – Uelzen
14	Ute Bertram	Hildesheim
15	Maximilian Oppelt	Stadt Hannover I
16	Diana Rieck-Vogt	Stadt Hannover II
17	Eckhard Pols	Lüchow-Dannenberg – Lüneburg
18	Oliver Grundmann	Stade I – Rotenburg II
19	Andreas Weber	Helmstedt – Wolfsburg
20	Holger Bormann	Salzgitter – Wolfenbüttel
21	Andreas Mattfeldt	Osterholz – Verden
22	André Berghegger	Osnabrück-Land
23	Roy Kühne	Goslar – Northeim – Osterode
24	Axel Knoerig	Diepholz – Nienburg I
25	Maik Beermann	Nienburg II – Schaumburg
26	Philipp Albrecht	Delmenhorst – Wesermarsch – Oldenburg-Land
27	Joachim Kleen	Aurich – Emden
28	Carsten Büttinghaus	Rotenburg I – Heidekreis
29	Albert Stegemann	Mittelems
30	Silvia Breher	Cloppenburg – Vechta
31	Britta Witte	
32	Annelene Bornmann	
33	Kathleen Radeck	
34	Rainer Hajek	
35	Barbara Woltmann	
36	Andrea Risius	
37	Olaf Lichy	
38	Cornelia Hesselmann	
39	Anika Bittner	
40	Till Voß	
41	Jonas Schlossarek	
42	Maria von Berg	
43	Nesrin Odabasi	
44	Alexander Börger	
45	Silke Kollster	
46	Monika Insinger	
47	Jobst-Alexander Dreß	
48	Juliane Große-Neugebauer	
49	Petra Averbeck	
50	Benjamin Müller	
51	Diana Siedentopf	
52	Kerstin Lorentsen	
53	Kai-Christian Schönwald	
54	Anja Thiede	
55	Beate Senholdt	
56	Frank Germeshausen	
57	Klara Horst	
58	Claudia Staiger	
59	Andreas Ahnefeld	
60	Meike Lübbers	
61	Heike Benecke	
62	Cornell-Anette Babendererde	

SPD list
#	Candidate	Constituency
1	Hubertus Heil	Gifhorn – Peine
2	Susanne Mittag	Delmenhorst – Wesermarsch – Oldenburg-Land
3	Matthias Miersch	Hannover-Land II
4	Svenja Stadler	Harburg
5	Lars Klingbeil	Rotenburg I – Heidekreis
6	Siemtje Möller	Friesland – Wilhelmshaven – Wittmund
7	Dennis Rohde	Oldenburg – Ammerland
8	Yasmin Fahimi	Stadt Hannover II
9	Johannes Schraps	Hameln-Pyrmont – Holzminden
10	Frauke Heiligenstadt	Goslar – Northeim – Osterode
11	Johann Saathoff	Aurich – Emden
12	Dunja Kreiser	Salzgitter – Wolfenbüttel
13	Bernd Westphal	Hildesheim
14	Anja Troff-Schaffarzyk	Unterems
15	Jakob Blankenburg	Lüchow-Dannenberg – Lüneburg
16	Marja-Liisa Völlers	Nienburg II – Schaumburg
17	Andreas Philippi	Göttingen
18	Anke Hennig	Osnabrück-Land
19	Falko Mohrs	Helmstedt – Wolfsburg
20	Peggy Schierenbeck	Diepholz – Nienburg I
21	Manuel Gava	Stadt Osnabrück
22	Rebecca Schamber	Hannover-Land I
23	Daniel Schneider	Cuxhaven – Stade II
24	Daniela De Ridder	Mittelems
25	Alexander Bartz	Cloppenburg – Vechta
26	Christos Pantazis	Braunschweig
27	Dirk-Ulrich Mende	Celle – Uelzen
28	Anna Hohmann	
29	Adis Ahmetovic	Stadt Hannover I
30	Michael Harjes	Osterholz – Verden
31	Silke Gardlo	
32	Kai Köser	Stade I – Rotenburg II
33	Eckhard Wagner	
34	Barbara Fahncke	
35	Daniel Schweer	
36	Daniela Rump	
37	Niels Schockemöhle	
38	Thomas Grambow	
39	Brigitte Brinkmann	
40	Doris Brandt	
41	Bastian Schenk	
42	Reinhard Dobelmann	
43	Eva-Marie Flügge	
44	Sonja von Berg	
45	Andrea Eibs-Lüpcke	
46	Kristina Harings	
47	Marten Gäde	
48	Amina Yousaf	
49	Benedikt Pape	
50	Heike Beckord	
51	Holger Kromminga	
52	Carl Niederste Frielinghaus	
53	Manon Luther	
54	Lina-Johanna Menke	
55	Tomke Meier	
56	Katja Brößling	
57	Maria Winter	
58	Jonas Farwig	
59	Dennis Grages	
60	Louisa-Bärbel Baumgarten	
61	Nicole Piechotta	
62	Marek Wischnewski	
63	Dennis True	
64	Hannes Henze	
65	Aynur Colpan	

Green list
#	Candidate	Constituency
1	Filiz Polat	Osnabrück-Land
2	Sven-Christian Kindler	Stadt Hannover II
3	Christina-Johanne Schröder	Delmenhorst – Wesermarsch – Oldenburg-Land
4	Jürgen Trittin	Göttingen
5	Julia Verlinden	Lüchow-Dannenberg – Lüneburg
6	Frank Bsirske	Helmstedt – Wolfsburg
7	Katja Keul	Nienburg II – Schaumburg
8	Helge Limburg	Hameln-Pyrmont – Holzminden
9	Karoline Otte	Goslar – Northeim – Osterode
10	Stefan Wenzel	Cuxhaven – Stade II
11	Swantje Michaelsen	Stadt Hannover I
12	Julian Pahlke	Unterems
13	Susanne Menge	Oldenburg – Ammerland
14	Ottmar von Holtz	Hildesheim
15	Margaux Erdmann	Braunschweig
16	Thomas Klein	Stadt Osnabrück
17	Lena Gumnior	Osterholz – Verden
18	Henrik Werner	Gifhorn – Peine
19	Nadja Weippert	Harburg
20	Tanja Meyer	Cloppenburg – Vechta
21	Sina Beckmann	Friesland – Wilhelmshaven – Wittmund
22	Claas Goldenstein	Stade I – Rotenburg II
23	Simone Meyer	Hannover-Land II
24	Jens Palandt	Hannover-Land I
25	Claudia Bei der Wieden	Salzgitter – Wolfenbüttel
26	Everhard Hüsemann	Mittelems
27	Sylvia Holste-Hagen	Diepholz – Nienburg I
28	Michael Kopatz	Rotenburg I – Heidekreis
29	Bela Lange	
30	Stefan Maas	Aurich – Emden
31	Begüm Langefeld	
32	Markus Jordan	Celle – Uelzen
33	Svenja Appuhn	
34	Dirk-Claas Ulrich	
35	Liliana Josek	
36	Patrick Drenske	
37	Judith Frauen	
38	Ernst-Eckhard Tietke	
39	Pia Scholten	
40	Hagen Langosch	

AfD list
#	Candidate	Constituency
1	Joachim Wundrak	Friesland – Wilhelmshaven – Wittmund
2	Frank Rinck	Hildesheim
3	Thomas Ehrhorn	Celle – Uelzen
4	Dietmar Friedhoff	Hannover-Land I
5	Jörn König	Stadt Hannover I
6	Dirk Brandes	Hannover-Land II
7	Danny Meiners	Mittelems
8	Harald Wiese	
9	Stefan Marzischewski-Drewes	Gifhorn – Peine
10	Mirco Hanker	
11	Volker Körlin	Rotenburg I – Heidekreis
12	Thomas Schlick	

FDP list
#	Candidate	Constituency
1	Christian Dürr	Delmenhorst – Wesermarsch – Oldenburg-Land
2	Jens Beeck	Mittelems
3	Anja Schulz	Celle – Uelzen
4	Konstantin Kuhle	Göttingen
5	Knut Gerschau	Stadt Hannover II
6	Gero Clemens Hocker	Osterholz – Verden
7	Matthias Seestern-Pauly	Osnabrück-Land
8	Anikó Glogowski-Merten	Braunschweig
9	Henrik Jacobs	Hildesheim
10	Daniel Rüdel	Oldenburg – Ammerland
11	Sarah Buss	Aurich – Emden
12	Nino Ruschmeyer	Harburg
13	Nadin Zaya	Hannover-Land II
14	Steven Hermeling	Stade I – Rotenburg II
15	Carolin Abeln	Cloppenburg – Vechta
16	Nemir Ali	Stadt Osnabrück
17	Kristin Krumm	Helmstedt – Wolfsburg
18	Moritz Mönkemeyer	Hameln-Pyrmont – Holzminden
19	Anton van den Born	Nienburg II – Schaumburg
20	Hendrik Theemann	Friesland – Wilhelmshaven – Wittmund
21	Max Weitemeier	Salzgitter – Wolfenbüttel
22	Ferhat Asi	Unterems
23	Claus Künzle	Rotenburg I – Heidekreis
24	Katharina Wieking	Stadt Hannover I
25	Thomas Schellhorn	Gifhorn – Peine
26	Jan Hinderks	Diepholz – Nienburg I
27	Günter Wichert	Cuxhaven – Stade II
28	Grigorios Aggelidis	Hannover-Land I

Left list
#	Candidate	Constituency
1	Amira Mohamed Ali	Oldenburg – Ammerland
2	Victor Perli	Salzgitter – Wolfenbüttel
3	Heidi Reichinnek	Stadt Osnabrück
4	Mizgin Ciftci	Osterholz – Verden
5	Jörg-Diether Dehm-Desoi	
6	Behiye Uca	
7	Andreas Mantzke	Gifhorn – Peine
8	Eva-Maria Brunnemann	Goslar – Northeim – Osterode
9	Lars-Alexander Hirsch	
10	Vivienne-Janice Widawski	
11	Linus Petersen	
12	Birgit Reimers	
13	Raphael Maas	
14	Lewia Gerlinger	
15	Stephan Rocznik	
16	Jana Thomas	
17	Isi-Doreen Knigge	

=== Bremen ===
#	Constituency	CDU/CSU	SPD	GRÜNE	AfD	FDP	LINKE	Other
54	Bremen I	Thomas Röwekamp	Sarah Ryglewski	Kirsten Kappert-Gonther	Heinrich Löhmann	Volker Redder	Cindi Tuncel	Merle Andersen (PARTEI); Patrick Strauß (FW); Wolfgang Lange (MLPD); Ronald-Oliver Marahrens (dieBasis); Antje Piegsa (ÖDP); Bennet Henking (PDV); Cornelia Balog-Broschinski (Tierschutz); Michael Speer (Volt)
55	Bremen II – Bremerhaven	Wiebke Winter	Uwe Schmidt	Michael Labetzke	Thomas Jürgewitz	Gökhan Akkamis	Doris Achelwilm	Ralf Fasmers (PARTEI); Katharina Büntjen (FW); Rolf Bode (V-Partei3); Jürgen Bader (MLPD); Annette Kaufmann (dieBasis); Kara Tober (ÖDP); Mathis Härtel (PDV); Christian Daum (Piraten)

CDU list
#	Candidate	Constituency
1	Thomas Röwekamp	Bremen I
2	Christine Schnittker	
3	Wiebke Winter	Bremen II – Bremerhaven
4	Theresa Gröninger	
5	Florian Dietrich	

SPD list
#	Candidate	Constituency
1	Sarah Ryglewski	Bremen I
2	Uwe Schmidt	Bremen II – Bremerhaven
3	Selin Ece Arpaz	
4	Derik Eicke	
5	Lizza Besecke	
6	Dominique Ofcarek	

Green list
#	Candidate	Constituency
1	Kirsten Kappert-Gonther	Bremen I
2	Michael Labetzke	Bremen II – Bremerhaven
3	Alexandra Werwath	
4	Paul-Nikos Günther	
5	Sahhanim Görgü-Philipp	
6	Marcus Wewer	

AfD list
#	Candidate	Constituency
1	Hans Kappelt	Cuxhaven – Stade II
2	Heinrich Löhmann	Bremen I

FDP list
#	Candidate	Constituency
1	Volker Redder	Bremen I
2	Lencke Wischhusen	
3	Gökhan Akkamis	Bremen II – Bremerhaven
4	Marcel Schröder	
5	Bettina Schiller	
6	Fynn Voigt	
7	Gwen Marei Sohns	
8	Tom Daniel	
9	Celine Eberhardt	
10	Frank Seidel	
11	Dennis Stojic	
12	Sören Gorniak	

Left list
#	Candidate	Constituency
1	Doris Achelwilm	Bremen II – Bremerhaven
2	Cindi Tuncel	Bremen I
3	Medine Yildiz	
4	Charlotte Schmitz	
5	Sofia Leonidakis	
6	Christian Gerlin	

=== Brandenburg ===
#	Constituency	CDU/CSU	SPD	GRÜNE	AfD	FDP	LINKE	Other
56	Prignitz – Ostprignitz-Ruppin – Havelland I	Sebastian Steineke	Wiebke Papenbrock	Maximilian Kowol	Dominik Kaufner	Thomas Essig	Anja Mayer	Corvin Drößler (PARTEI); Michael Güldener (FW); Stephan Dietzsch (dieBasis); Axel Heidkamp (Piraten); Norbert Glamann (Ind.); Willi Eckelmann (Ind.)
57	Uckermark – Barnim I	Jens Koeppen	Stefan Zierke	Michael Kellner	Hannes Gnauck	Friedhelm Boginski	Isabelle Czok-Alm	Niels Neudeck (PARTEI); Thomas Löb (ÖDP); Christoph Graf von Schlippenbach (Ind.)
58	Oberhavel – Havelland II	Uwe Feiler	Ariane Fäscher	Anne Schumacher	Ulrich Storm	Ralf Tiedemann	Anke Domscheit-Berg	Rick Grothe (PARTEI); Stefanie Gebauer (FW); Nathanael Uhlig (ÖDP); Sven Lingreen (dieBasis); Thomas Ney (Piraten)
59	Märkisch-Oderland – Barnim II	Sabine Buder	Simona Koß	Kim Stattaus	Lars Günther	Mirko Dachroth	Niels-Olaf Lüders	Mario Schlauß (PARTEI); Hans-Günther Schleife (DKP); Roman Kutschick (ÖDP); Dirk Herzog (dieBasis); Ralf Lorenz (Ind.)
60	Brandenburg an der Havel – Potsdam-Mittelmark I – Havelland III – Teltow-Fläming I	Dietlind Tiemann	Sonja Eichwede	Alexandra Pichl	Axel Brösicke	Patrick Meinhardt	Tobias Bank	Isabell Knauff (PARTEI); Michael Müller (FW); Martina Schallert (ÖDP); Guido Esser (dieBasis); Mathias Täge (Piraten); Thomas Rödiger (Unabhängige); Corinna Conrad (Ind.); Klaas Hinners (Ind.)
61	Potsdam – Potsdam-Mittelmark II – Teltow-Fläming II	Saskia Ludwig	Olaf Scholz	Annalena Baerbock	Tim Krause	Linda Teuteberg	Norbert Müller	Orson Baecker (PARTEI); Andreas Menzel (FW); Frank Ehrhardt (DKP); Daniel Margraf (ÖDP); Antje Grütte (MLPD); Dorit Rust (dieBasis); Lukas Minogue (PDV); Benjamin Körner (Volt); Lu Yen Roloff (Ind.); Edmund Müller (Ind.); Ingo Charnow (Ind.)
62	Dahme-Spreewald – Teltow-Fläming III – Oberspreewald-Lausitz I	Jana Schimke	Sylvia Lehmann	Gerhard Kalinka	Steffen Kotré	Lars Hartfelder	Carsten Preuß	Christiane Müller-Schmolt (Tierschutz); Uwe Tanneberger (FW); Susanne Steinhardt (DKP); Ralf Nobel (ÖDP); Torsten Bartels (dieBasis); Guido Körber (Piraten); Michael Gabler (Ind.); Roald Hitzer (Ind.); Volker Commentz (Ind.); Andreas Beer (Familie)
63	Frankfurt (Oder) – Oder-Spree	Daniel Rosentreter	Mathias Papendieck	Marcus Winter	Wilko Möller	Jasmin Stüwe	Stefan Kunath	Cindy Rosenkranz (PARTEI); Kai Hamacher (FW); Norman Heß (ÖDP); Dieter Weihrauch (MLPD); Thomas Wötzel (dieBasis); Ralf Kaun (Ind.); Manuela Marquardt (Ind.)
64	Cottbus – Spree-Neiße	Markus Niggemann	Maja Wallstein	Heide Schinowsky	Daniel Münschke	Laura Schieritz	Christian Görke	Michael Matschke (PARTEI); Andreas Richter (FW); Gisela Vierrath (DKP); Lysann Kobbe (dieBasis); Ingo Weidelt (Unabhängige)
65	Elbe-Elster – Oberspreewald-Lausitz II	Knut Abraham	Hannes Walter	Paul-Philipp Neumann	Silvio Wolf	Martin Neumann	Yvonne Mahlo	Bianca Schröder (PARTEI); Roxana Trasper (FW); Ilona Janda (MLPD); Kay-Uwe Blietz (dieBasis); Marcel Respa (Unabhängige)

CDU list
#	Candidate	Constituency
1	Jens Koeppen	Uckermark – Barnim I
2	Uwe Feiler	Oberhavel – Havelland II
3	Jana Schimke	Dahme-Spreewald – Teltow-Fläming III – Oberspreewald-Lausitz I
4	Knut Abraham	Elbe-Elster – Oberspreewald-Lausitz II
5	Sebastian Steineke	Prignitz – Ostprignitz-Ruppin – Havelland I
6	Dietlind Tiemann	Brandenburg an der Havel – Potsdam-Mittelmark I – Havelland III – Teltow-Fläming I
7	Saskia Ludwig	Potsdam – Potsdam-Mittelmark II – Teltow-Fläming II
8	Sabine Buder	Märkisch-Oderland – Barnim II
9	Markus Niggemann	Cottbus – Spree-Neiße
10	Daniel Rosentreter	Frankfurt (Oder) – Oder-Spree
11	Sebastian Rick	
12	Carolin Bucher-Schulz	
13	Larissa Markus	

SPD list
#	Candidate	Constituency
1	Olaf Scholz	Potsdam – Potsdam-Mittelmark II – Teltow-Fläming II
2	Maja Wallstein	Cottbus – Spree-Neiße
3	Stefan Zierke	Uckermark – Barnim I
4	Sylvia Lehmann	Dahme-Spreewald – Teltow-Fläming III – Oberspreewald-Lausitz I
5	Mathias Papendieck	Frankfurt (Oder) – Oder-Spree
6	Sonja Eichwede	Brandenburg an der Havel – Potsdam-Mittelmark I – Havelland III – Teltow-Fläming I
7	Hannes Walter	Elbe-Elster – Oberspreewald-Lausitz II
8	Simona Koß	Märkisch-Oderland – Barnim II
9	Martin Ehlers	
10	Ariane Fäscher	Oberhavel – Havelland II
11	Remo Ortmann	
12	Wiebke Papenbrock	Prignitz – Ostprignitz-Ruppin – Havelland I
13	Finn Kuhne	
14	Friederike Linke	
15	Sven Szramek	
16	Jana Gruber	
17	Stefan Labahn	
18	Ria Geyer	
19	Catharina Bockelmann	

Green list
#	Candidate	Constituency
1	Annalena Baerbock	Potsdam – Potsdam-Mittelmark II – Teltow-Fläming II
2	Michael Kellner	Uckermark – Barnim I
3	Anna Emmendörffer	
4	Jan Sommer	
5	Heide Schinowsky	Cottbus – Spree-Neiße
6	Antonius Naumann	
7	Annemarie Schumacher	Oberhavel – Havelland II
8	Maximilian Kowol	Prignitz – Ostprignitz-Ruppin – Havelland I
9	Julia Schmidt	
10	Clemens Wehr	

AfD list
#	Candidate	Constituency
1	Alexander Gauland	
2	René Springer	
3	Steffen Kotré	Dahme-Spreewald – Teltow-Fläming III – Oberspreewald-Lausitz I
4	Norbert Kleinwächter	
5	Hannes Gnauck	Uckermark – Barnim I
6	Leyla Bilge	
7	Dominik Kaufner	Prignitz – Ostprignitz-Ruppin – Havelland I
8	Daniela Oeynhausen	
9	Benjamin Filter	

FDP list
#	Candidate	Constituency
1	Linda Teuteberg	Potsdam – Potsdam-Mittelmark II – Teltow-Fläming II
2	Friedhelm Boginski	Uckermark – Barnim I
3	Laura Schieritz	Cottbus – Spree-Neiße
4	Mirko Dachroth	Märkisch-Oderland – Barnim II
5	Johanna Mandelkow	
6	Ralf Tiedemann	Oberhavel – Havelland II
7	Sören Gerulat	
8	Lars Hartfelder	Dahme-Spreewald – Teltow-Fläming III – Oberspreewald-Lausitz I
9	Günther Jonitz	
10	Ralph Lindner	

Left list
#	Candidate	Constituency
1	Christian Görke	Cottbus – Spree-Neiße
2	Anke Domscheit-Berg	Oberhavel – Havelland II
3	Anja Mayer	Prignitz – Ostprignitz-Ruppin – Havelland I
4	Stefan Kunath	Frankfurt (Oder) – Oder-Spree
5	Martina Trauth	
6	Tobias Bank	Brandenburg an der Havel – Potsdam-Mittelmark I – Havelland III – Teltow-Fläming I
7	Isabelle Czok-Alm	Uckermark – Barnim I
8	Niels-Olaf Lüders	Märkisch-Oderland – Barnim II
9	Yvonne Mahlo	Elbe-Elster – Oberspreewald-Lausitz II
10	Björn Krüger	

=== Saxony-Anhalt ===
#	Constituency	CDU/CSU	SPD	GRÜNE	AfD	FDP	LINKE	Other
66	Altmark	Uwe Harms	Herbert Wollmann	Gregor Laukert	Arno Bausemer	Marcus Faber	Matthias Höhn	Nils Krümmel (FW); Martin Schwab (dieBasis); Danny Bibiella (Ind.); Heiko Janowski (Ind.)
67	Börde – Jerichower Land	Gerry Weber	Franziska Kersten	Thomas Schlenker	Jan Schmidt	Mathias Schulte	David Schliesing	Marcel Nakoinz (Tierschutzallianz); André Futh (FW); Bettina Graf (dieBasis); Carina Hansen (Tierschutz)
68	Harz	Heike Brehmer	Maik Berger	Wolfgang Strauhs	Sören Stefanowicz	Denise Köcke	Karsten Lippmann	Carlo Gottschalk (FW); Thomas Barth (MLPD); Uwe Rohrbeck (dieBasis)
69	Magdeburg	Tino Sorge	Martin Kröber	Urs Liebau	Frank Pasemann	Fabian Horn	Chris Scheunchen	Aila Fassl (Tierschutzallianz); Eckhard Schröder (FW); Luisa Graviat (PARTEI); Roland Zander (Gartenpartei); Daniel Wiegenstein (MLPD); Reiner Füllmich (dieBasis); Peter von Pokrzywnicki (ÖDP); Franka Kretschmer (Ind.)
70	Dessau – Wittenberg	Sepp Müller	Leonard Schneider	Steffi Lemke	Andreas Mrosek	Alexander Oppelt	Johannes Hüthel	Steven Slavicek (FW); Ernst Wolff (dieBasis); Mario Rohne (Ind.); Günther Wassenaar (Ind.)
71	Anhalt	Frank Wyszkowski	Anne Stamm	Hans Schweizer	Kay-Uwe Ziegler	Thorben Fiedler	Jan Korte	Ronny Schneider (FW); Alkje Fontes (dieBasis); Johanna Zimmermann (Ind.)
72	Halle	Christoph Bernstiel	Karamba Diaby	Inés Brock	Alexander Raue	Yana Mark	Petra Sitte	Andrea Menke (FW); Jakob Brand (PARTEI); Adrian Mauson (MLPD); Stephan Kohn (dieBasis)
73	Burgenland – Saalekreis	Dieter Stier	Jens Wojtyscha	Martina Hoffmann	Martin Reichardt	Carsten Sonntag	Birke Bull-Bischoff	Jens Jahr (dieBasis)
74	Mansfeld	Torsten Schweiger	Katrin Budde	Mika-Sören Erdmann	Robert Farle	Ingo Bodtke	Daniel Feuerberg	Sarah Biedermann (FW); Pierre Kynast (dieBasis)

CDU list
#	Candidate	Constituency
1	Heike Brehmer	Harz
2	Dieter Stier	Burgenland – Saalekreis
3	Tino Sorge	Magdeburg
4	Christoph Bernstiel	Halle
5	Sepp Müller	Dessau – Wittenberg
6	Torsten Schweiger	Mansfeld
7	Uwe Harms	Altmark
8	Gerry Weber	Börde – Jerichower Land
9	Frank Wyszkowski	Anhalt
10	Anna Kreye	
11	Claus-Christian Kühne	
12	Kathrin Rösel	
13	Henry Klipp	

SPD list
#	Candidate	Constituency
1	Karamba Diaby	Halle
2	Katrin Budde	Mansfeld
3	Martin Kröber	Magdeburg
4	Franziska Kersten	Börde – Jerichower Land
5	Maik Berger	Harz
6	Anne Stamm	Anhalt
7	Leonard Schneider	Dessau – Wittenberg
8	Herbert Wollmann	Altmark
9	Jens Wojtyschak	Burgenland – Saalekreis

Green list
#	Candidate	Constituency
1	Steffi Lemke	Dessau – Wittenberg
2	Urs Liebau	Magdeburg
3	Inés Brock	Halle
4	Gregor Laukert	Altmark
5	Nicola Mühling	
6	Hans Schweizer	Anhalt

AfD list
#	Candidate	Constituency
1	Martin Reichardt	Burgenland – Saalekreis
2	Jan Schmidt	Börde – Jerichower Land
3	Arno Bausemer	Altmark
4	Andreas Mrosek	Dessau – Wittenberg
5	Heinz-Peter Günther	
6	Birgit Albrecht	
7	Marvin Friese	

FDP list
#	Candidate	Constituency
1	Marcus Faber	Altmark
2	Ingo Bodtke	Mansfeld
3	Denise Köcke	Harz
4	Fabian Horn	Magdeburg
5	Alexander Oppelt	Dessau – Wittenberg

Left list
#	Candidate	Constituency
1	Jan Korte	Anhalt
2	Petra Sitte	Halle
3	Birke Bull-Bischoff	Burgenland – Saalekreis
4	Matthias Höhn	Altmark
5	Anja Krimmling-Schoeffler	
6	Karsten Lippmann	Harz
7	Nadja Lüttich	
8	David Schliesing	Börde – Jerichower Land
9	Sabine Künzel	
10	Daniel Feuerberg	Mansfeld

=== Berlin ===
#	Constituency	CDU/CSU	SPD	GRÜNE	AfD	FDP	LINKE	Other
75	Berlin-Mitte	Ottilie Klein	Annika Klose	Hanna Steinmüller	Beatrix von Storch	Anna Kryszan	Martin Neise	Martin Pohlmann (PARTEI); Georg Tsambasis (Tierschutz); Torsten Schwald (Piraten); Richard Borrmann (ÖDP); Annegret Höcker (MLPD); Rudolf Fritz (LKR); Juliane Mörsel (PDV); Valerie Irvani (Volt); Ulrike Fischer (dieBasis); Michael Fielsch (Ind.); Ayman Zebian (Ind.)
76	Berlin-Pankow	Manuela Anders-Granitzki	Klaus Mindrup	Stefan Gelbhaar	Götz Frömming	Daniela Kluckert	Udo Wolf	Jannis Kiesewalter (PARTEI); Elke Weihusen (Tierschutz); Marianne Utz (Piraten); Ilja Martin (FW); Felix Werth (Gesundheit); Thomas Kuhn (ÖDP); Paul Seifert (LKR); Paul von Loeper (Volt)
77	Berlin-Reinickendorf	Monika Grütters	Torsten Einstmann	Bernd Schwarz	Sebastian Maack	Friedrich Ohnesorge	Hakan Taş	Pauline Klimas (PARTEI); Friederike Nabrdalik (Tierschutz); Michael Schulz (Grauen); Dirk Steffel (FW); Andreas Neumann (ÖDP); Manfred Salzmann (dieBasis)
78	Berlin-Spandau – Charlottenburg North	Joe Chialo	Helmut Kleebank	Steffen Laube	Lukas Garnis	Dominik Znanewitz	Evrim Sommer	Rhavin Grobert (PARTEI); Aida Castañeda (Tierschutz); Jens-Eberhard Jahn (ÖDP); Esther Engel (MLPD); Nicole Jädicke (LKR); Philipp Zühlke (dieBasis); Michael Dönicke (B21); Lucia Bunte (Ind.)
79	Berlin-Steglitz-Zehlendorf	Thomas Heilmann	Ruppert Stüwe	Nina Stahr	Birgit Malsack-Winkemann	Hanns-Henning Krumrey	Marcus Otto	Erik Westmann (PARTEI); Laura Höll (Tierschutz); Georg Boroviczény (Piraten); Klaus-Peter von Lüdeke (FW); Karl-Friedrich Harter (Gesundheit); Alina Sahl (ÖDP); Carsten Schanz (LKR); Claus-Henning Hacker (dieBasis)
80	Berlin-Charlottenburg-Wilmersdorf	Klaus-Dieter Gröhler	Michael Müller	Lisa Paus	Eva-Marie Doerfler	Christoph Meyer	Michael Efler	Lennart Schwertfeger (PARTEI); Henriette Spiering (Tierschutz); Therese Lehnen (Piraten); Marcel Luthe (FW); Lars Arnold (ÖDP); Christian Schmidt (LKR); Barend Wolf (PDV); Carolin Linge (dieBasis); Norbert Voß (Ind.)
81	Berlin-Tempelhof-Schöneberg	Jan-Marco Luczak	Kevin Kühnert	Renate Künast	Frank-Christian Hansel	Lars Lindemann	Alexander King	Marie Geissler (PARTEI); Martin Ullrich (Tierschutz); Alexander Spies (Piraten); Mario Rhode (FW); Kirsten Jäkel (ÖDP); Thomas Speich (LKR); Karsten Wappler (dieBasis); Sahin Azbak (Mensch)
82	Berlin-Neukölln	Christina Schwarzer	Hakan Demir	Andreas Audretsch	Marcel Goldammer	Janine Falkenberg	Lucia Schnell	Thomas Tegtow (PARTEI); Ishai Rosenbaum (Tierschutz); Mohamad Tawil (MLPD); Christian Lieberam (LKR); Havva Öruc (Todenhöfer); Wilfried Meyer (dieBasis); Ramona Cole (Ind.); Christian Pape (Ind.); Thomas Lindlmair (Ind.); Kilian Moser (Ind.)
83	Berlin-Friedrichshain-Kreuzberg – Prenzlauer Berg East	Kevin Kratzsch	Cansel Kiziltepe	Canan Bayram	Sibylle Schmidt	Ann Riedel	Pascal Meiser	Martin Sonneborn (PARTEI); Marie Motzkus (Tierschutz); Franz Schmitt (Piraten); Hagen Albers (ÖDP); Nicole Drakos (du.); Chaker Araki (MLPD); Christian Lieberam (LKR); Stephan Haym (PDV); Carola Muysers (dieBasis); Zarah-Louise Roth (B*); Frigga Wendt (Ind.); Oliver Snelinski (Ind.)
84	Berlin-Treptow-Köpenick	Claudia Pechstein	Ana-Maria Trăsnea	Annkatrin Esser	Denis Henkel	Carl Grouwet	Gregor Gysi	Daniel Günther (PARTEI); Markus Anhalt (Tierschutz); Michael Knape (FW); Steffen Kadow (ÖDP); Claudius Reich (MLPD); Randy Witte (LKR); Maria Macheleidt (dieBasis)
85	Berlin-Marzahn-Hellersdorf	Mario Czaja	Enrico Bloch	Anne Thiel-Klein	Thomas Braun	Alice Schmidt	Petra Pau	Andrea Schulteisz (PARTEI); Ina Seidel-Grothe (Tierschutz); Christa Wolfer (MLPD); Axel Scherka (LKR); Dietmar Lucas (dieBasis)
86	Berlin-Lichtenberg	Wilfried Nünthel	Anja Ingenbleek	Laura Dornheim	Dietmar Drewes	Lina Thiel	Gesine Lötzsch	Nora Röhner (PARTEI); Katja Michel (Tierschutz); Tobias Bauer (FW); Lisa Stemmer (ÖDP); Dagmar Arnecke (MLPD); Matthias Bruse (LKR); Ulrich Klieboldt (dieBasis)

CDU list
#	Candidate	Constituency
1	Monika Grütters	Berlin-Reinickendorf
2	Jan-Marco Luczak	Berlin-Tempelhof-Schöneberg
3	Ottilie Klein	Berlin-Mitte
4	Thomas Heilmann	Berlin-Steglitz-Zehlendorf
5	Klaus-Dieter Gröhler	Berlin-Charlottenburg-Wilmersdorf
6	Claudia Pechstein	Berlin-Treptow-Köpenick
7	Christina Schwarzer	Berlin-Neukölln
8	Kevin Kratzsch	Berlin-Friedrichshain-Kreuzberg – Prenzlauer Berg East
9	Jörg Schumacher	
10	Vanessa Tietz	

SPD list
#	Candidate	Constituency
1	Michael Müller	Berlin-Charlottenburg-Wilmersdorf
2	Cansel Kiziltepe	Berlin-Friedrichshain-Kreuzberg – Prenzlauer Berg East
3	Kevin Kühnert	Berlin-Tempelhof-Schöneberg
4	Annika Klose	Berlin-Mitte
5	Ruppert Stüwe	Berlin-Steglitz-Zehlendorf
6	Ana-Maria Trăsnea	Berlin-Treptow-Köpenick
7	Torsten Einstmann	Berlin-Reinickendorf
8	Anja Ingenbleek	Berlin-Lichtenberg
9	Enrico Bloch	Berlin-Marzahn-Hellersdorf
10	Alexandra Frölich	
11	Ulrike Rosensky	
12	Barbara Loth	

Green list
#	Candidate	Constituency
1	Lisa Paus	Berlin-Charlottenburg-Wilmersdorf
2	Stefan Gelbhaar	Berlin-Pankow
3	Renate Künast	Berlin-Tempelhof-Schöneberg
4	Andreas Audretsch	Berlin-Neukölln
5	Nina Stahr	Berlin-Steglitz-Zehlendorf
6	Laura Dornheim	Berlin-Lichtenberg
7	Annkatrin Esser	Berlin-Treptow-Köpenick
8	Juliana Wimmer	
9	Hanna Steinmüller	Berlin-Mitte
10	Bernd Schwarz	Berlin-Reinickendorf
11	Maya Richter	
12	Philip Hiersemenzel	
13	Susanne Jahn	
14	Simon Müller	
15	Nicole Holtz	
16	Torsten Kirschke	
17	Bianka Denfeld	
18	Steffen Laube	Berlin-Spandau – Charlottenburg North
19	Johanna Haffner	
20	Tarek Annan	

AfD list
#	Candidate	Constituency
1	Beatrix von Storch	Berlin-Mitte
2	Gottfried Curio	
3	Götz Frömming	Berlin-Pankow
4	Georg Pazderski	
5	Birgit Malsack-Winkemann	Berlin-Steglitz-Zehlendorf
6	Marcel Goldammer	Berlin-Neukölln
7	Denis Henkel	Berlin-Treptow-Köpenick
8	Mêtonou Démagbo	

FDP list
#	Candidate	Constituency
1	Christoph Meyer	Berlin-Charlottenburg-Wilmersdorf
2	Daniela Kluckert	Berlin-Pankow
3	Lars Lindemann	Berlin-Tempelhof-Schöneberg
4	Hanns-Henning Krumrey	Berlin-Steglitz-Zehlendorf
5	Ann Riedel	Berlin-Friedrichshain-Kreuzberg – Prenzlauer Berg East
6	Janine Falkenberg	Berlin-Neukölln
7	Anna Kryszan	Berlin-Mitte

Left list
#	Candidate	Constituency
1	Petra Pau	Berlin-Marzahn-Hellersdorf
2	Pascal Meiser	Berlin-Friedrichshain-Kreuzberg – Prenzlauer Berg East
3	Gesine Lötzsch	Berlin-Lichtenberg
4	Udo Wolf	Berlin-Pankow
5	Evrim Sommer	Berlin-Spandau – Charlottenburg North
6	Martin Neise	Berlin-Mitte
7	Lucia Schnell	Berlin-Neukölln
8	Alexander King	Berlin-Tempelhof-Schöneberg
9	Anika Taschke	
10	Marcus Otto	Berlin-Steglitz-Zehlendorf

=== North Rhine-Westphalia ===
#	Constituency	CDU/CSU	SPD	GRÜNE	AfD	FDP	LINKE	Other
87	Aachen I	Rudolf Henke	Ye-One Rhie	Oliver Krischer	Roger Lebien	Katharina Willkomm	Andrej Hunko	Elke Zobel (PARTEI); Hans-Jürgen Fink (FW); Stephan Korupp (dieBasis); Adonis Böving (Ind.); Niklas Teßmann (Ind.)
88	Aachen II	Catarina dos Santos Firnhaber	Claudia Moll	Lukas Benner	Michael Winterich	Birgit Havenath	Johannes Koch	Helmut Keischgens (FW); Axel Susen (dieBasis)
89	Heinsberg	Wilfried Oellers	Norbert Spinrath	Dignanllely Meurer	Hermann Navel	Alexander Dorner	Rüdiger Birmann	Mark Benecke (PARTEI); Hans-Peter Weiland (FW); Michael Aggelidis (dieBasis)
90	Düren	Thomas Rachel	Dietmar Nietan	Chris Andrä	Wolfgang Kochs	Laura Jacobsen-Littig	Valentin Veithen	Stephan Staß (PARTEI); Philipp Eismar (Piraten); Frank Bank (FW); Werner Hürttlen (dieBasis); Peter Helmer (Ind.)
91	Rhein-Erft-Kreis I	Georg Kippels	Aaron Spielmanns	Rüdiger Warnecke	Eugen Schmidt	Stefan Westerschulze	Sirin Seitz	Kristian Katzmarek (Piraten); Ulrich Wokulat (FW); Patrik Müller (dieBasis); Helene Susojev (LIEBE)
92	Euskirchen – Rhein-Erft-Kreis II	Detlef Seif	Dagmar Andres	Marion Sand	Rüdiger Lucassen	Markus Herbrand	Stefan Söhngen	Jan-Luis Wolter (PARTEI); Stefano Tuchsherer (Piraten); Jörg Esser (FW); Paulo Pinto (dieBasis)
93	Cologne I	Karsten Möring	Sanae Abdi	Lisa-Marie Friede	Fabian Jacobi	Reinhard Houben	Madeine Eisfeld	Aaron Baron von Kruedener (PARTEI); Detlef Hagenbruch (FW); Elisabeth Höchtl (MLPD); Ralf Schäfer (dieBasis); Rebekka Müller (Volt); Martin Przybylski (Ind.)
94	Cologne II	Sandra von Möller	Marion Sollbach	Sven Lehmann	Luca Leittersdorf	Joachim Krämer	Matthias Birkwald	Judit Géczi (PARTEI); Torsten Ilg (FW); Mahdi Rezai (MLPD); Walter Stehling (DKP); Markus Hoffleit (dieBasis); Olivier Fuchs (Volt)
95	Cologne III	Gisela Manderla	Rolf Mützenich	Katharina Dröge	Jochen Haug	Volker Görzel	Michael Weisenstein	Stefan Pott (PARTEI); Norbert Theiß (FW); Reiner Dworschak (MLPD); Songül Schlürscheid (dieBasis); Christopher Peterka (Volt); Christoph Goldbeck (Ind.); Maciej Podjaski (Ind.)
96	Bonn	Christoph Jansen	Jessica Rosenthal	Katrin Uhlig	Hans Neuhoff	Alexander Graf Lambsdorff	Ilja Bergen	Moritz Van den Bergh (PARTEI); Jutta Acar (FW); Roger Stamm (MLPD); Gregor Berneiser (dieBasis); Reinhard Limbach (LKR); Livia Juliane Genn (Volt)
97	Rhein-Sieg-Kreis I	Elisabeth Winkelmeier-Becker	Sebastian Hartmann	Lisa Anschütz	Hans Günter Eifler	Ralph Lorenz	Alexander Neu	Andreas Langel (PARTEI); Andreas Irion (FW); Ellen Hölzer (dieBasis); Christian Sontag (Volt); Helmut Fleck (Volksabstimmung)
98	Rhein-Sieg-Kreis II	Norbert Röttgen	Katja Stoppenbrink	Richard Ralfs	Roger Beckamp	Nicole Westig	Andreas Danne	Marcel Klingenstein (PARTEI); Michael Stehr (FW); Nathalie Friedrich (dieBasis); Jörg Drenkelfort (LKR); Philipp Prause (Volt)
99	Oberbergischer Kreis	Carsten Brodesser	Michaela Engelmeier	Sabine Grützmacher	Bernd Rummler	Jörg Von Polheim	Diyar Agu	Philipp Wüster (PARTEI); Christian Abstoß (FW); Markos Pavlidis (dieBasis)
100	Rheinisch-Bergischer Kreis	Hermann-Josef Tebroke	Kastriot Krasniqi	Maik Außendorf	Harald Weyel	Christian Lindner	Isabelle Casel	Uwe Wirges (FW); Helfa Aufmkolk (dieBasis); Markus Blümke (Volt)
101	Leverkusen – Cologne IV	Serap Güler	Karl Lauterbach	Nyke Slawik	Christer Cremer	Cornelia Besser	Beate Hane-Knoll	Frauke Petzold (PARTEI); Stephan Heintze (FW); Jonathan Meier (MLPD); Dirk Sattelmaier (dieBasis); Jacqueline Blum (Ind.)
102	Wuppertal I	Caroline Lünenschloss	Helge Lindh	Anja Liebert	Martin Liedtke-Bentlage	Manfred Todtenhausen	Till Sörensen-Siebel	Thomas Hofmann (PARTEI); Henrik Dahlmann (FW); Nuran Cakmakli-Kraft (MLPD); Alexander Grefarth (dieBasis); Lars Herbold (Volt)
103	Solingen – Remscheid – Wuppertal II	Jürgen Hardt	Ingo Schäfer	Silvia Vaeckenstedt	Frederick Kühne	Robert Weindl	Mohamad Shoan Vaisi	Judith Röder (PARTEI); Jan Klein (FW); Christoph Gärtner (MLPD); Volker Dörner (dieBasis); Peter Kramer (Ind.)
104	Mettmann I	Klaus Wiener	Christian Steinacker	Roland Schüren	Martin Renner	Nicole Burda	Lutz Gallasch	Mathias Huning (FW); Marc Gutknecht (dieBasis); Bernd Herrmann (Ind.); Thorsten Klimczak (Ind.)
105	Mettmann II	Peter Beyer	Kerstin Greise	Ophelia Nick	Jessica Malisch	Jessica Denné-Weiß	Birgit Onori	Mario De Falco (PARTEI); Mario Sülz (FW); Horst Dotten (MLPD); Editha Roetger (dieBasis); Marcel Stubbe (Bündnis C); Andrea Konorza (LKR); Jason Richter (Ind.)
106	Düsseldorf I	Thomas Jarzombek	Zanda Martens	Frederik Hartmann	Andrea Kraljic	Marie-Agnes Strack-Zimmermann	Helmut Born	Jan Knichala (PARTEI); Burkhard Harting (FW); Paul Straif (MLPD); Susanne Bachmann (dieBasis); Nadin Lindermann (LKR); Jennifer Scharpenberg (Volt); Lara Baumanns (Ind.)
107	Düsseldorf II	Sylvia Pantel	Andreas Rimkus	Sara Nanni	Uta Opelt	Christoph Stork	Julia Marmulla	Robin Bartz (PARTEI); Hans-Joachim Grumbach (FW); Daniela Maus (MLPD); Lucia Petarus (dieBasis); Falk Thörmer (Volt)
108	Neuss I	Hermann Gröhe	Daniel Rinkert	Petra Schenke	Stefan Hrdy	Bijan Djir-Sarai	Falk vom Dorff	Lisa Granderath (PARTEI); Bastian Schönbeck (dieBasis); Ernst Herbert (Ind.)
109	Mönchengladbach	Günter Krings	Gülistan Yüksel	Kathrin Henneberger	Peter Müller	Peter König		Maximilian Bergmann (PARTEI); Annette Schrader-Schoutz (FW); Marcel Rommerskirchen (DKP); Mona Aranea Guillén (dieBasis)
110	Krefeld I – Neuss II	Ansgar Heveling	Philipp Einfalt	Katharina Voller	Christof Rausch	Otto Fricke	Julia Suermondt	Konstantin Florenz (PARTEI); Ralf Krings (FW); Heiko Grupp (MLPD); Stefan Marzinowski (dieBasis)
111	Viersen	Martin Plum	Udo Schiefner	Rene Heesen	Kay Gottschalk	Eric Scheuerle	Britta Pietsch	Marion Weißkopf (PARTEI); Georg Alsdorf (FW); Natalie Frohn (dieBasis)
112	Kleve	Stefan Rouenhoff	Bodo Wißen	Friederike Janitza	Gerd Plorin	Georg Cluse	Norbert Hayduk	Adriana Hellmann (FW); Andreas Reiß (dieBasis)
113	Wesel I	Sabine Weiss	Rainer Keller	Hans-Peter Weiß	Holger Raumann	Bernd Reuther	Sidney Lewandowski	Dirk Zerressen (PARTEI); Christian Link (FW); Wolf-Dieter Rochlitz (MLPD); Matthias Moser (dieBasis)
114	Krefeld II – Wesel II	Kerstin Radomski	Jan Dieren	Ulle Schauws	Hauke Finger	Michael Terwiesche	Sebastian Schubert	Carsten Butterwegge (PARTEI); Hans-Günther Schmitz (FW); Genja Raboteau (MLPD); Lars Kosma (dieBasis)
115	Duisburg I	Thomas Mahlberg	Bärbel Bas	Lamya Kaddor	Sascha Lensing	Charline Kappes	Mirze Edis	Jan Richter (FW); Günther Bittel (MLPD); Felix Engelke (dieBasis); Fatma Ergin (Ind.); Boris Opfer (Ind.)
116	Duisburg II	Volker Mosblech	Mahmut Özdemir	Felix Banaszak	Rainer Holfeld	Markus Giesler	Christian Leye	Mark Altenschmidt (FW); Peter Römmele (MLPD); Beate Buchra (dieBasis); Roland Helmer (Ind.); Marliese Lens (Ind.); Ayfer Saygili (Ind.)
117	Oberhausen – Wesel III	Marie-Luise Dött	Dirk Vöpel	Stefanie Weyland	Olaf Wilhelm	Roman Müller-Böhm	Sascha H. Wagner	Hans-Joachim Sommers (PARTEI); Guido Horn (FW); Simon Thomas (V-Partei3); Erhan Aktürk (MLPD); Ralf Wosnek (dieBasis)
118	Mülheim – Essen I	Astrid Timmermann-Fechter	Sebastian Fiedler	Franziska Krumwiede-Steiner	Alexander von Wrese	Joachim vom Berg	Eliseo Maugeri	Pascal Plew (PARTEI); Joachim Kluft (FW); Hannes Stockert (MLPD); Peter Köster (DKP); Nicole Weber (dieBasis); Horst Bilo (Ind.)
119	Essen II	Florian Fuchs	Dirk Heidenblut	Christine Müller-Hechfellner	Andrea Poußet	Martin Hollinger	Jules El-Khatib	Christian Gröll (PARTEI); Wilfried Adamy (FW); Gabi Fechtner (MLPD); Siw Mammitzsch (DKP); Frank Solga (dieBasis)
120	Essen III	Matthias Hauer	Gereon Wolters	Kai Gehring	Stefan Keuter	Rüdiger König	Ezgi Güyildar	Martin O. Lange (PARTEI); Kai Hemsteeg (FW); Dirk Willing (MLPD); Diana Kummer (DKP); Volker Wild (dieBasis); Dirk Schmidt (LKR)
121	Recklinghausen I	Michael Breilmann	Frank Schwabe	Nils Stennei	Lutz Wagner	Marlies Greve	Uwe Biletzke	Carsten Majewski (PARTEI); Klaus Dumberger (MLPD); Werner Sarbok (DKP)
122	Recklinghausen II	Lars Ehm	Brian Nickholz	Robin Conrad	Bernard Keber	Robert Heinze	Ulrike Eifler	Angelina Klementz (PARTEI); Sabine Leopold (MLPD); Detlev Beyer-Peters (DKP)
123	Gelsenkirchen	Laura Rosen	Markus Töns	Irene Mihalic	Jörg Schneider	Marco Buschmann	Ayten Kaplan	Claudia Kapuschinski (PARTEI); Frank Perlik (FW); Lisa Gärtner (MLPD); Frank Lustig (dieBasis); Ronald Wetklo (Ind.)
124	Steinfurt I – Borken I	Jens Spahn	Sarah Lahrkamp	Alexandra Schoo	Torsten Etgeton	Alexander Brockmeier	Gerrit Bresch	Lars Nowak (PARTEI)
125	Bottrop – Recklinghausen III	Sven Volmering	Michael Gerdes	Kim Wiesweg	Detlef Bauer	Sebastian Steinzen	Lisa Ellermann	Ingo Lilienthal (PARTEI); Bärbel Kersken (MLPD); Jörg Wingold (DKP); Norbert Manniegel (dieBasis); Klausjochen Berger (LKR)
126	Borken II	Anne König	Nadine Heselhaus	Bernhard Lammersmann	Michael Espendiller	Karlheinz Busen	Michael Frieg	Tobias Finke (PARTEI); Bastian Nitsche (FW)
127	Coesfeld – Steinfurt II	Marc Henrichmann	Johannes Waldmann	Anne-Monika Spallek	Leonhard Martin	René Arning	Klaus Stegemann	Stephan Heitbaum (FW); Heinz Eul (dieBasis)
128	Steinfurt III	Anja Karliczek	Jürgen Coße	Jan-Niclas Gesenhues	Florian Elixmann	Christian Markert	Kathrin Vogler	Heidi Pelster (PARTEI); Gabriele Georgiou (Ind.); Hendrik Kaldewei (Ind.)
129	Münster	Stefan Nacke	Svenja Schulze	Maria Klein-Schmeink	Helmut Birke	Klaus Kretzer	Kira Sawilla	Roland Scholle (PARTEI); Olaf Wirl (FW); Alina Möller (ÖDP); Andrea Dumberger (MLPD); Manfred Stolper (DKP); Peter Balint (dieBasis); Carina Beckmann (Volt); Sarah Geselbracht (Ind.)
130	Warendorf	Henning Rehbaum	Bernhard Daldrup	Jessica Wessels	Dennis Dinter	Oliver Niedostadek	Reiner Jenkel	Ludger Gerhardt (ÖDP); Thomas Hesse (dieBasis); Marius Brehm (Ind.)
131	Gütersloh I	Ralph Brinkhaus	Elvan Korkmaz	Sebastian Stölting	Axel Nußbaum	Patrick Büker	Camila Cirlini	Ann-Katrin Hanneforth (PARTEI); Kai Funke (FW); Anna Zajonc (MLPD); René Markmann (dieBasis); Werner Martinschledde (Ind.)
132	Bielefeld – Gütersloh II	Angelika Westerwelle	Wiebke Esdar	Britta Haßelmann	Maximilian Kneller	Jan Schlifter	Friedrich Straetmanns	Tjark Nitsche (PARTEI); Reinhard Schultka (MLPD); Jürgen Wächter (dieBasis); Stefan Upmeier zu Belzen (Volt)
133	Herford – Minden-Lübbecke II	Joachim Ebmeyer	Stefan Schwartze	Maik Babenhauserheide	Sebastian Schulze	Jens Teutrine	Jan Lieberum	Laura Möller (PARTEI); Evelyn Taborsky (FW); Radisa Amidzic (dieBasis); Martin Sonnabend (Ind.)
134	Minden-Lübbecke I	Oliver Vogt	Achim Post	Schahina Gambir	Sebastian Landwehr	Frank Schäffler	Jule Kegel	Sebastian Schmitz (PARTEI); Michael Müller (FW); Stephan Lorenzen (dieBasis); Dietrich Janzen (Bündnis C)
135	Lippe I	Kerstin Vieregge	Jürgen Berghahn	Robin Wagener	Udo Hemmelgarn	Christian Sauter	Walter Brinkmann	Niklas Hartmann (PARTEI); Ralf Ochsenfahrt (FW); Enrico Haberkorn (dieBasis); Michael Haupt (LKR)
136	Höxter – Gütersloh III – Lippe II	Christian Haase	Ulrich Kros	Nik Riesmeier	Klaus Lange	Tanja Kuffner	Alina Wolf	Annalena Thiel (PARTEI); Michael Schröder (FW); Sandra Fröhlingsdorf (dieBasis)
137	Paderborn	Carsten Linnemann	Burkhard Blienert	Jörg Schlüter	Günter Koch	Roze Özmen	Martina Schu	Rosanna Martens (PARTEI); Günter Arlt (FW); Anna Löper (dieBasis)
138	Hagen – Ennepe-Ruhr-Kreis I	Christian Nienhaus	Timo Schisanowski	Janosch Dahmen	Andreas Geitz	Katrin Helling-Plahr	Ingo Hentschel	Athanasios Sarakatsanos (PARTEI); Sara Buschner (FW); Reinhard Funk (MLPD); Markus Effenberger (dieBasis); Michael Tropp (Ind.)
139	Ennepe-Ruhr-Kreis II	Hartmut Ziebs	Axel Echeverria	Ina Gießwein	Carl-Dietrich Korte	Anna Neumann	Clemens Jost	Michael Hanses (PARTEI); Eric Tiggemann (Piraten); Thorsten Michaelis (FW); Achim Czylwick (MLPD); Michael Kirchner (dieBasis)
140	Bochum I	Fabian Schütz	Axel Schäfer	Max Lucks		Olaf in der Beek	Sevim Dagdelen	Lena Bormann (PARTEI); Anna Vöhringer (MLPD); Yan Ugodnikov (PDV); Andreas Triebel (dieBasis)
141	Herne – Bochum II	Christoph Bußmann	Michelle Müntefering	Jacob Liedtke	Markus Dossenbach	Klaus Füßmann	Felix Oekentorp	Nana Sippel (PARTEI); Andreas Walter (FW); Peter Weispfenning (MLPD); Sven Heiermann (dieBasis)
142	Dortmund I	Klaus Wegener	Jens Peick	Markus Kurth	Heinrich Garbe	Roman Senga	Ann-Christin Huber	Marco Bülow (PARTEI)
142	Dortmund I	Klaus Wegener	Jens Peick	Markus Kurth	Heinrich Garbe	Roman Senga	Ann-Christin Huber	Michael Badura (Tierschutz); Mario Krause (FW); Sarah Rißmann (MLPD); Hanfried Brenner (DKP); Achim Lohse (dieBasis); Daniel Staiger (Volt); Paul Hofmann (Ind.); Noah Trojanowski (Ind.)
143	Dortmund II	Michael Depenbrock	Sabine Poschmann	Anke Weber	Matthias Helferich	Frieder Löhrer	Sonja Lemke	Sandra Goerdt (PARTEI); Stephanie Linde (Tierschutz); Iris Häger (FW); Klara Kossack (MLPD); Nils Märtin (DKP); Nancy Meyer (Volt)
144	Unna I	Hubert Hüppe	Oliver Kaczmarek	Michael Sacher	Ulrich Lehmann	Suat Gülden	Andreas Meier	Thomas Cieszynski (FW); Tobias Thylmann (MLPD); Artur Helios (dieBasis); Nadine Peiler (Ind.)
145	Hamm – Unna II	Arnd Hilwig	Michael Thews	Martin Kesztyüs	Robert Hennig	Lucas Slunjski	Rebekka Kämpfe	Folke Hellmig (FW); Dominik Pfau (dieBasis)
146	Soest	Hans-Jürgen Thies	Wolfgang Hellmich	Shahabuddin Miah	Berengar Elsner von Gronow	Fabian Griewel	Helle Robert	Wolfgang Sälzer (dieBasis)
147	Hochsauerlandkreis	Friedrich Merz	Dirk Wiese	Maria Tillmann	Otto Strauß	Carl-Julius Cronenberg	Karl-Ludwig Gössling	Andreas Hövelmann (PARTEI); Sebastian Vielhaber (FW); Klaus Selter (dieBasis)
148	Siegen-Wittgenstein	Volkmar Klein	Luiza Licina-Bode	Laura Kraft	Henning Zoz	Guido Müller	Ekkard Büdenbender	Tobias Wied (PARTEI); Horst Linde (FW); Roland Meister (MLPD); Hubert Weber (dieBasis); Inka Berg (Volt)
149	Olpe – Märkischer Kreis I	Florian Müller	Nezahat Baradari	Holger Thamm	Klaus Heger	Johannes Vogel	Otto Ersching	Sabrina Dieckmann (FW); Engelbert Prevorcic (DKP); Dagmar Welz (dieBasis)
150	Märkischer Kreis II	Paul Ziemiak	Bettina Lugk	Ingo Stuckmann	Daniel Bläsing	Jochen Lipproß	Michael Thomas-Lienkämper	Michael Siethoff (Tierschutz); Hans Herbers (FW); Stefan Radtke (dieBasis)

CDU list
#	Candidate	Constituency
1	Armin Laschet	
2	Anja Karliczek	Steinfurt III
3	Ralph Brinkhaus	Gütersloh I
4	Jens Spahn	Steinfurt I – Borken I
5	Elisabeth Winkelmeier-Becker	Rhein-Sieg-Kreis I
6	Paul Ziemiak	Märkischer Kreis II
7	Günter Krings	Mönchengladbach
8	Serap Güler	Leverkusen – Cologne IV
9	Thomas Rachel	Düren
10	Astrid Timmermann-Fechter	Mülheim – Essen I
11	Matthias Hauer	Essen III
12	Thomas Jarzombek	Düsseldorf I
13	Sabine Weiss	Wesel I
14	Hermann Gröhe	Neuss I
15	Catarina dos Santos Firnhaber	Aachen II
16	Michael Breilmann	Recklinghausen I
17	Kerstin Vieregge	Lippe I
18	Stefan Nacke	Münster
19	Oliver Vogt	Minden-Lübbecke I
20	Kerstin Radomski	Krefeld II – Wesel II
21	Hubert Hüppe	Unna I
22	Jürgen Hardt	Solingen – Remscheid – Wuppertal II
23	Marie-Luise Dött	Oberhausen – Wesel III
24	Volkmar Klein	Siegen-Wittgenstein
25	Arnd Hilwig	Hamm – Unna II
26	Gisela Manderla	Cologne III
27	Thomas Mahlberg	Duisburg I
28	Peter Beyer	Mettmann II
29	Georg Kippels	Rhein-Erft-Kreis I
30	Laura Rosen	Gelsenkirchen
31	Hans-Jürgen Thies	Soest
32	Angelika Westerwelle	Bielefeld – Gütersloh II
33	Rudolf Henke	Aachen I
34	Christoph Jansen	Bonn
35	Sandra von Möller	Cologne II
36	Stefan Rouenhoff	Kleve
37	Joachim Ebmeyer	Herford – Minden-Lübbecke II
38	Carsten Brodesser	Oberbergischer Kreis
39	Fabian Schütz	Bochum I
40	Sylvia Pantel	Düsseldorf II
41	Hermann-Josef Tebroke	Rheinisch-Bergischer Kreis
42	Karsten Möring	Cologne I
43	Detlef Seif	Euskirchen – Rhein-Erft-Kreis II
44	Caroline Lünenschloss	Wuppertal I
45	Hartmut Ziebs	Ennepe-Ruhr-Kreis II
46	Katharina Kotulla	
47	Wilfried Oellers	Heinsberg
48	Martin Plum	Viersen
49	Christian Nienhaus	Hagen – Ennepe-Ruhr-Kreis I
50	Michael Depenbrock	Dortmund II
51	Klaus Wiener	Mettmann I
52	Barbara Aßmann	
53	Christoph Bußmann	Herne – Bochum II
54	Lars Ehm	Recklinghausen II
55	Andrea Dangela	
56	Florian Fuchs	Essen II
57	Heinrich Zertik	
58	Veronika Rilke-Haerst	
59	Volker Mosblech	Duisburg II
60	Bernhard Schulte	
61	Katrin Schulze Zurmussen	
62	Hanno Kehren	
63	Klaus Wegener	Dortmund I
64	Birgit Tornau	
65	Patrick Sensburg	
66	Stephan Krüger	
67	Elisabeth Dusdal	
68	Michael Weber	
69	Heiko Hendriks	
70	Kerstin Brauer	
71	Hans-Martin Schuster	
72	Mathias Edwin Höschel	
73	Simone Stehr	
74	Sebastian Wladarz	
75	Helena Brüggemann	

SPD list
#	Candidate	Constituency
1	Rolf Mützenich	Cologne III
2	Svenja Schulze	Münster
3	Sebastian Hartmann	Rhein-Sieg-Kreis I
4	Kerstin Griese	Mettmann II
5	Dirk Wiese	Hochsauerlandkreis
6	Sabine Poschmann	Dortmund II
7	Udo Schiefner	Viersen
8	Claudia Moll	Aachen II
9	Bernhard Daldrup	Warendorf
10	Nadine Heselhaus	Borken II
11	Stefan Schwartze	Herford – Minden-Lübbecke II
12	Bärbel Bas	Duisburg I
13	Achim Post	Minden-Lübbecke I
14	Bettina Lugk	Märkischer Kreis II
15	Oliver Kaczmarek	Unna I
16	Wiebke Esdar	Bielefeld – Gütersloh II
17	Dietmar Nietan	Düren
18	Dagmar Andres	Euskirchen – Rhein-Erft-Kreis II
19	Andreas Rimkus	Düsseldorf II
20	Jessica Rosenthal	Bonn
21	Wolfgang Hellmich	Soest
22	Gülistan Yüksel	Mönchengladbach
23	Karl Lauterbach	Leverkusen – Cologne IV
24	Sarah Lahrkamp	Steinfurt I – Borken I
25	Frank Schwabe	Recklinghausen I
26	Nezahat Baradari	Olpe – Märkischer Kreis I
27	Helge Lindh	Wuppertal I
28	Zanda Martens	Düsseldorf I
29	Jürgen Coße	Steinfurt III
30	Ye-One Rhie	Aachen I
31	Axel Echeverria	Ennepe-Ruhr-Kreis II
32	Luiza Licina-Bode	Siegen-Wittgenstein
33	Daniel Rinkert	Neuss I
34	Elvan Korkmaz	Gütersloh I
35	Norbert Spinrath	Heinsberg
36	Michelle Müntefering	Herne – Bochum II
37	Bodo Wißen	Kleve
38	Michaela Engelmeier	Oberbergischer Kreis
39	Johannes Waldmann	Coesfeld – Steinfurt II
40	Sanae Abdi	Cologne I
41	Michael Gerdes	Bottrop – Recklinghausen III
42	Katja Stoppenbrink	Rhein-Sieg-Kreis II
43	Ingo Schäfer	Solingen – Remscheid – Wuppertal II
44	Marion Sollbach	Cologne II
45	Kastriot Krasniqi	Rheinisch-Bergischer Kreis
46	Jürgen Berghahn	Lippe I
47	Aaron Spielmanns	Rhein-Erft-Kreis I
48	Michael Thews	Hamm – Unna II
49	Jan Dieren	Krefeld II – Wesel II
50	Brian Nickholz	Recklinghausen II
51	Timo Schisanowski	Hagen – Ennepe-Ruhr-Kreis I
52	Burkhard Blienert	Paderborn
53	Gereon Wolters	Essen III
54	Axel Schäfer	Bochum I
55	Christian Steinacker	Mettmann I
56	Markus Töns	Gelsenkirchen
57	Jens Peick	Dortmund I
58	Philipp Einfalt	Krefeld I – Neuss II
59	Ulrich Kros	Höxter – Gütersloh III – Lippe II
60	Dirk Presch	
61	Rainer Keller	Wesel I
62	Sebastian Fiedler	Mülheim – Essen I
63	Dirk Vöpel	Oberhausen – Wesel III
64	Mahmut Özdemir	Duisburg II
65	Dirk Heidenblut	Essen II
66	Jörg Lorenz	
67	Joachim Schmidt	
68	Frank Mederlet	
69	Claus Homm	
70	Jörg Biesterfeld	
71	Ingo Stucke	
72	Karsten Gerlach	
73	Carsten Ganser	
74	Felix Höppner	
75	Florian Westerwalbesloh	
76	Michael Richter	
77	Florian Götting	
78	Tobias Hetz	
79	Ulrich Pock	
80	Heinz Mix	
81	Helge Sulfrian	
82	Johannes Stracke	

Green list
#	Candidate	Constituency
1	Britta Haßelmann	Bielefeld – Gütersloh II
2	Oliver Krischer	Aachen I
3	Irene Mihalic	Gelsenkirchen
4	Sven Lehmann	Cologne II
5	Katharina Dröge	Cologne III
6	Felix Banaszak	Duisburg II
7	Maria Klein-Schmeink	Münster
8	Jan-Niclas Gesenhues	Steinfurt III
9	Ulle Schauws	Krefeld II – Wesel II
10	Robin Wagener	Lippe I
11	Nyke Slawik	Leverkusen – Cologne IV
12	Lamya Kaddor	Duisburg I
13	Ophelia Nick	Mettmann II
14	Max Lucks	Bochum I
15	Katrin Uhlig	Bonn
16	Kai Gehring	Essen III
17	Sara Nanni	Düsseldorf II
18	Maik Außendorf	Rheinisch-Bergischer Kreis
19	Schahina Gambir	Minden-Lübbecke I
20	Kathrin Henneberger	Mönchengladbach
21	Anne-Monika Spallek	Coesfeld – Steinfurt II
22	Markus Kurth	Dortmund I
23	Laura Kraft	Siegen-Wittgenstein
24	Janosch Dahmen	Hagen – Ennepe-Ruhr-Kreis I
25	Sabine Grützmacher	Oberbergischer Kreis
26	Lukas Benner	Aachen II
27	Anja Liebert	Wuppertal I
28	Michael Sacher	Unna I
29	Franziska Krumwiede-Steiner	Mülheim – Essen I
30	Rene Heesen	Viersen
31	Maria Tillmann	Hochsauerlandkreis
32	Roland Schüren	Mettmann I
33	Ina Gießwein	Ennepe-Ruhr-Kreis II
34	Sebastian Stölting	Gütersloh I
35	Lisa-Marie Friede	Cologne I
36	Richard Ralfs	Rhein-Sieg-Kreis II
37	Alexandra Schoo	Steinfurt I – Borken I
38	Shahabuddin Miah	Soest
39	Katharina Voller	Krefeld I – Neuss II
40	Maik Babenhauserheide	Herford – Minden-Lübbecke II
41	Anna Kipp	
42	Anas Al-Qur'an	
43	Anke Weber	Dortmund II
44	Alexander Tietz-Latza	
45	Lisa Anschütz	Rhein-Sieg-Kreis I
46	Chris Andrä	Düren
47	Annette von dem Bottlenberg	
48	Jacob Liedtke	Herne – Bochum II
49	Petra Schenke	Neuss I
50	Parisa Ariatabar	
51	Regina Kaiser	
52	Robin Conrad	Recklinghausen II
53	Sabine von der Beck	
54	Nik Riesmeier	Höxter – Gütersloh III – Lippe II
55	Kim Wiesweg	Bottrop – Recklinghausen III
56	Fabian Müller	
57	Nicola Dichant	
58	Martin Kesztyüs	Hamm – Unna II
59	Antje Westhues	
60	Sascha Gajewski-Schneck	
61	Elisabeth Schaper	
62	Hans-Peter Weiß	Wesel I
63	Stefanie Weyland	Oberhausen – Wesel III
64	Thomas Reinert	
65	Anna-Lena Winkler	
66	Martha Stötzel	
67	Emelie Segler	
68	Anja Boenke	
69	Cylia Ungar	
70	Frederik Hartmann	Düsseldorf I
71	Marie Haas	
72	Dennis Hoffmann	
73	Franziska Schwinge	
74	Benjamin Zander	
75	Kim Schröter	
76	Vera Jandt	
77	Janne Mijdam	
78	Dieter Koenemann	
79	Christine Müller-Hechfellner	Essen II
80	Frederik Antary	

AfD list
#	Candidate	Constituency
1	Rüdiger Lucassen	Euskirchen – Rhein-Erft-Kreis II
2	Kay Gottschalk	Viersen
3	Fabian Jacobi	Cologne I
4	Martin Renner	Mettmann I
5	Jörg Schneider	Gelsenkirchen
6	Michael Espendiller	Borken II
7	Matthias Helferich	Dortmund II
8	Roger Beckamp	Rhein-Sieg-Kreis II
9	Harald Weyel	Rheinisch-Bergischer Kreis
10	Eugen Schmidt	Rhein-Erft-Kreis I
11	Jochen Haug	Cologne III
12	Stefan Keuter	Essen III
13	Udo Hemmelgarn	Lippe I
14	Uta Opelt	Düsseldorf II
15	Christer Cremer	Leverkusen – Cologne IV
16	Maximilian Kneller	Bielefeld – Gütersloh II
17	Jessica Malisch	Mettmann II
18	Lutz Wagner	Recklinghausen I
19	Martin Liedtke-Bentlage	Wuppertal I
20	Rainer Holfeld	Duisburg II

FDP list
#	Candidate	Constituency
1	Christian Lindner	Rheinisch-Bergischer Kreis
2	Marie-Agnes Strack-Zimmermann	Düsseldorf I
3	Alexander Graf Lambsdorff	Bonn
4	Marco Buschmann	Gelsenkirchen
5	Johannes Vogel	Olpe – Märkischer Kreis I
6	Bijan Djir-Sarai	Neuss I
7	Otto Fricke	Krefeld I – Neuss II
8	Reinhard Houben	Cologne I
9	Frank Schäffler	Minden-Lübbecke I
10	Nicole Westig	Rhein-Sieg-Kreis II
11	Karlheinz Busen	Borken II
12	Markus Herbrand	Euskirchen – Rhein-Erft-Kreis II
13	Bernd Reuther	Wesel I
14	Carl-Julius Cronenberg	Hochsauerlandkreis
15	Katrin Helling-Plahr	Hagen – Ennepe-Ruhr-Kreis I
16	Christian Sauter	Lippe I
17	Olaf in der Beek	Bochum I
18	Jens Teutrine	Herford – Minden-Lübbecke II
19	Manfred Todtenhausen	Wuppertal I
20	Katharina Willkomm	Aachen I
21	Fabian Griewel	Soest
22	Oliver Niedostadek	Warendorf
23	Robert Heinze	Recklinghausen II
24	Charline Kappes	Duisburg I
25	Patrick Büker	Gütersloh I
26	Jessica Denné-Weiß	Mettmann II
27	Jörg Von Polheim	Oberbergischer Kreis
28	Anna Neumann	Ennepe-Ruhr-Kreis II
29	Laura Jacobsen-Littig	Düren
30	Stefan Westerschulze	Rhein-Erft-Kreis I
31	Joachim vom Berg	Mülheim – Essen I
32	Cornelia Besser	Leverkusen – Cologne IV
33	Robert Weindl	Solingen – Remscheid – Wuppertal II
34	Jan Schlifter	Bielefeld – Gütersloh II
35	Eric Scheuerle	Viersen
36	Klaus Kretzer	Münster
37	Roze Özmen	Paderborn
38	Suat Gülden	Unna I
39	Guido Müller	Siegen-Wittgenstein
40	Volker Görzel	Cologne III
41	Alexander Brockmeier	Steinfurt I – Borken I
42	Nicole Burda	Mettmann I
43	Klaus Füßmann	Herne – Bochum II
44	Joachim Krämer	Cologne II
45	Michael Terwiesche	Krefeld II – Wesel II
46	Marlies Greve	Recklinghausen I
47	Tanja Kuffner	Höxter – Gütersloh III – Lippe II
48	Birgit Havenath	Aachen II
49	Christian Markert	Steinfurt III
50	René Arning	Coesfeld – Steinfurt II
51	Christoph Stork	Düsseldorf II
52	Martin Hollinger	Essen II
53	Markus Giesler	Duisburg II
54	Sebastian Steinzen	Bottrop – Recklinghausen III
55	Lucas Slunjski	Hamm – Unna II
56	Rüdiger König	Essen III
57	Ralph Lorenz	Rhein-Sieg-Kreis I
58	Jochen Lipproß	Märkischer Kreis II

Left list
#	Candidate	Constituency
1	Sahra Wagenknecht	
2	Matthias Birkwald	Cologne II
3	Sevim Dağdelen	Bochum I
4	Andrej Hunko	Aachen I
5	Kathrin Vogler	Steinfurt III
6	Christian Leye	Duisburg II
7	Ulrike Eifler	Recklinghausen II
8	Alexander Neu	Rhein-Sieg-Kreis I
9	Britta Pietsch	Viersen
10	Friedrich Straetmanns	Bielefeld – Gütersloh II
11	Ezgi Güyildar	Essen III
12	Mohamad Shoan Vaisi	Solingen – Remscheid – Wuppertal II
13	Martina Schu	Paderborn – Gütersloh III
14	Hanno von Raußendorf	
15	Nicole Fritsche-Schmidt	
16	Stefan Söhngen	Euskirchen – Rhein-Erft-Kreis II
17	Mehriban Özdogan	
18	Diyar Agu	Oberbergischer Kreis
19	Isabelle Casel	Rheinisch-Bergischer Kreis
20	Felix Oekentorp	Herne – Bochum II
21	Gabriele Granrath	
22	Thomas Bell	
23	Carmen Hornung-Jahn	
24	Christian Kißler	

=== Saxony ===
#	Constituency	CDU/CSU	SPD	GRÜNE	AfD	FDP	LINKE	Other
151	Nordsachsen	Christiane Schenderlein	Rüdiger Kleinke	Denis Korn	René Bochmann	Martin Richter	Philipp Rubach	Karsten Gutjahr (PARTEI); Chris Daiser (FW); Uta Strenger (ÖDP); Doreen Klinger (dieBasis); Sven Asmus (Ind.); Sandro Oschkinat (Ind.)
152	Leipzig I	Jens Lehmann	Holger Mann	Marie Müser	Christoph Neumann	René Hobusch	Nina Treu	Katharina Subat (PARTEI); Thomas Weidinger (FW); Rahel Wehemeyer-Blum (ÖDP); Gudrun Kimmerle (MLPD); Kerry Cherki (dieBasis); Kristina Weidner (PDV); Ronald Härtlein (Ind.); Karl-Heinz Hummitzsch (Ind.); Ralf Kohl (Ind.); Martin Bayer (Ind.)
153	Leipzig II	Jessica Heller	Nadja Sthamer	Paula Piechotta	Siegbert Droese	Peter Jess	Sören Pellmann	Thomas Kumbernuß (PARTEI); André Soudah (FW); Thomas Köhler (Piraten); Tobias Kretschmer (ÖDP); Philipp Gäbel (MLPD); Matti Rabold (dieBasis); Jonas Lehn (PDV); Ulrika Schöllner (Ind.)
154	Leipzig-Land	Georg-Ludwig von Breitenbuch	Franziska Mascheck	Matthias Vialon	Edgar Naujok	Olaf Winne	Julia Schramm	Sabine Küchler (PARTEI); Denise Wendt (FW); Harald Vauk (ÖDP); Christian Toloczyki (dieBasis); Daniel Zimmet (Ind.)
155	Meißen	Sebastian Fischer	Stephanie Dzeyk	Karin Beese	Barbara Lenk	Johannes Ramos	Markus Pohle	Theresa Bergmann (PARTEI); André Langerfeld (FW); Steffen Förster (ÖDP); Maik Hoppe (dieBasis); Uwe Enge (LKR)
156	Bautzen I	Roland Ermer	Kathrin Michel	Lukas Mosler	Karsten Hilse	Matthias Schniebel	Caren Lay	Steffi Thomas (PARTEI); Dirk Nasdala (FW); Daniela Trittmacher (dieBasis); Maik Lehmann (LKR)
157	Görlitz	Florian Oest	Harald Prause‑Kosubek	Annett Jagiela	Tino Chrupalla	Rudolf Grüner	Marko Schmidt	Siegmund Hänchen (FW); Bernhard Blickle (MLPD); Stefan Heinke (dieBasis); Harald Twupack (LKR)
158	Sächsische Schweiz-Osterzgebirge	Corinna Franke‑Wöller	Fabian Funke	Nino Haustein	Steffen Janich	Dirk Jahn	André Hahn	Christoph Fröse (FW); Dirk Zimmermann (ÖDP); Roberto Mauksch (dieBasis); Klaus Brähmig (Ind.); Helga Queck (Ind.)
159	Dresden I	Markus Reichel	Rasha Nasr	Kassem Taher Saleh	Jens Maier	Torsten Herbst	Katja Kipping	Robert Küttner (PARTEI); Stephanie Henkel (Piraten); Markus Taubert (ÖDP); Andrea Ebert (MLPD); Constanze Grottker (dieBasis); Janko Vieweg (Bündnis C); Robert Ritter (PDV); Marcus Fuchs (Ind.); Lothar Häupl (Ind.)
160	Dresden II – Bautzen II	Lars Rohwer	Stephan Schumann	Merle Spellerberg	Andreas Harlaß	Silke Müller	Silvio Lang	Charlotte Brock (PARTEI); Korvin Lemke (FW); Anne Herpertz (Piraten); Florian Busch (ÖDP); Günter Slave (MLPD); Anke Althoff (dieBasis); Andreas Kabus (Gesundheit); Michael Gründler (BüSo); Frank Hannig (Ind.); Jens Düvelshaupt (Ind.)
161	Mittelsachsen	Veronika Bellmann	Alexander Geißler	Lea Fränzl	Carolin Bachmann	Philipp Hartewig	Stefan Hartmann	Marcus Lieder (ÖDP); Thomas Linke (dieBasis)
162	Chemnitz	Frank Heinrich	Detlef Müller	Karola Köpferl	Michael Klonovsky	Frank Müller-Rosentritt	Tim Detzner	Paul Vogel (PARTEI); Bert Rohne (ÖDP); Thomas Lörinczy (V-Partei3); Jörg Weidemann (MLPD); Normen Lienow (dieBasis); Daniel Richter (Ind.); Hans Röhder (Ind.)
163	Chemnitzer Umland – Erzgebirgskreis II	Marco Wanderwitz	Carlos Kasper	Bernhard Herrmann	Mike Moncsek	Monique Woiton	Sebastian Bernhardt	André Hofmann (PARTEI); Moritz Schüller (FW); Sebastian Högen (ÖDP); Jürgen Dreher (dieBasis)
164	Erzgebirgskreis I	Alexander Krauß	Silvio Heider	Sebastian Walter	Thomas Dietz	Ulrike Harzer	Clara Bünger	Carsten Staat (PARTEI); Andreas Schmiedel (FW); Jennifer Schilling (V-Partei3); Grit Weiß (dieBasis); Simon Haustein (Bündnis C); Sandro Reichel (Ind.)
165	Zwickau	Carsten Körber	Gundula Schubert	Wolfgang Wetzel	Matthias Moosdorf	Nico Tippelt	Sabine Zimmermann	Christiane Drechsel (FW); Daniel Micklisch (ÖDP); Christoph Heinritz‑Bechtel (dieBasis); Thomas Krajak (Ind.)
166	Vogtlandkreis	Yvonne Magwas	Kay Burmeister	Olaf Horlbeck	Mathias Weiser	André Ludwig	Johannes Höfer	Dietmar Eichhorn (ÖDP); Mario Falcke (dieBasis); Udo Sieghart (III. Weg); Claus Joachim Gerisch (Ind.); David Drechsel (LKR)

CDU list
#	Candidate	Constituency
1	Marco Wanderwitz	Chemnitzer Umland – Erzgebirgskreis II
2	Christiane Schenderlein	Nordsachsen
3	Markus Reichel	Dresden I
4	Yvonne Magwas	Vogtlandkreis
5	Carsten Körber	Zwickau
6	Jessica Heller	Leipzig II
7	Jens Lehmann	Leipzig I
8	Corinna Franke‑Wöller	Sächsische Schweiz-Osterzgebirge
9	Roland Ermer	Bautzen I
10	Veronika Bellmann	Mittelsachsen
11	Frank Heinrich	Chemnitz
12	Sebastian Fischer	Meißen
13	Bianca Erdmann-Reusch	
14	Sylke Jennewein	
15	Christina Ruge	
16	Heike Helbig	
17	Florian Stehl	
18	Anne Heimann	
19	Birgit Elsner	

SPD list
#	Candidate	Constituency
1	Holger Mann	Leipzig I
2	Kathrin Michel	Bautzen I
3	Detlef Müller	Chemnitz
4	Rasha Nasr	Dresden I
5	Carlos Kasper	Chemnitzer Umland – Erzgebirgskreis II
6	Nadja Sthamer	Leipzig II
7	Fabian Funke	Sächsische Schweiz-Osterzgebirge
8	Franziska Mascheck	Leipzig-Land
9	Alexander Geißler	Mittelsachsen
10	Gundula Schubert	Zwickau
11	Stephan Schumann	Dresden II – Bautzen II
12	Rüdiger Kleinke	Nordsachsen
13	Silvio Heider	Erzgebirgskreis I
14	Harald Prause‑Kosubek	Görlitz

Green list
#	Candidate	Constituency
1	Paula Piechotta	Leipzig II
2	Bernhard Herrmann	Chemnitzer Umland – Erzgebirgskreis II
3	Merle Spellerberg	Dresden II – Bautzen II
4	Kassem Taher Saleh	Dresden I
5	Annett Jagiela	Görlitz
6	Norman Volger	
7	Marie Müser	Leipzig I
8	Lukas Mosler	Bautzen I
9	Lea Fränzl	Mittelsachsen
10	Horst Grummich	
11	Karola Köpferl	Chemnitz
12	Olaf Horlbeck	Vogtlandkreis
13	Carolin Renner	
14	Carina Flores	
15	Karin Beese	Meißen

AfD list
#	Candidate	Constituency
1	Tino Chrupalla	Görlitz
2	Jens Maier	Dresden I
3	Siegbert Droese	Leipzig II
4	Karsten Hilse	Bautzen I
5	Andreas Harlaß	Dresden II – Bautzen II
6	Steffen Janich	Sächsische Schweiz-Osterzgebirge
7	Barbara Lenk	Meißen
8	Ulrich Oehme	
9	Christoph Neumann	Leipzig I
10	Christian Wesemann	
11	Frank-Michael Trenkler	
12	Martin Braukmann	
13	Thomas Dietz	Erzgebirgskreis I
14	Mike Moncsek	Chemnitzer Umland – Erzgebirgskreis II
15	René Bochmann	Nordsachsen
16	Edgar Naujok	Leipzig-Land
17	Holger Zielinski	
18	Nico Köhler	
19	Holger Prade	
20	Dirk Eckardt	

FDP list
#	Candidate	Constituency
1	Torsten Herbst	Dresden I
2	Frank Müller-Rosentritt	Chemnitz
3	Philipp Hartewig	Mittelsachsen
4	Ulrike Harzer	Erzgebirgskreis I
5	Nico Tippelt	Zwickau
6	Martin Richter	Nordsachsen
7	André Ludwig	Vogtlandkreis
8	Silke Müller	Dresden II – Bautzen II
9	Sylvia Kaufhold	
10	Peter Jess	Leipzig II
11	Johannes Ramos	Meißsen
12	René Hobusch	Leipzig I
13	Matthias Schniebel	Bautzen I
14	Monique Woiton	Chemnitzer Umland – Erzgebirgskreis II
15	Rudolf Grüner	Görlitz
16	Dirk Jahn	Sächsische Schweiz-Osterzgebirge

Left list
#	Candidate	Constituency
1	Katja Kipping	Dresden I
2	Sören Pellmann	Leipzig II
3	Caren Lay	Bautzen I
4	André Hahn	Sächsische Schweiz-Osterzgebirge
5	Clara Bünger	Erzgebirgskreis I
6	Tim Detzner	Chemnitz
7	Nina Treu	Leipzig I
8	Philipp Rubach	Nordsachsen
9	Nancy Hochstein	
10	Johannes Höfer	Vogtlandkreis
11	Claudia Scholz	
12	Marko Schmidt	Görlitz
13	Nora-Helene Scholz	
14	Markus Pohle	Meißen

=== Hesse ===
#	Constituency	CDU/CSU	SPD	GRÜNE	AfD	FDP	LINKE	Other
167	Waldeck	Armin Schwarz	Esther Dilcher	Peter Koswig	Jan Nolte	Jochem Rube	Regina Preysing	Kira Hauser (FW); Barbara Meyer (MLPD); Daniele Saracino (dieBasis); Gerd Müller (Ind.)
168	Kassel	Michael Aufenanger	Timon Gremmels	Boris Mijatović	Inge Johst	Matthias Nölke	Stephanie Schury	Franz Czisch (PARTEI); Michael Scheffler (FW); Klaus Bremer (MLPD); Stefan Fydrich (dieBasis); Wolfgang Peuckert (Bündnis C); Stephan Mascher (Ind.); Cornelius El-Fayoumy (Ind.)
169	Werra-Meißner – Hersfeld-Rotenburg	Wilhelm Gebhard	Michael Roth	Awet Tesfaiesus	Gerhard Schenk	Jorias Bach	Sabine Leidig	Rainer Janisch (FW); Heidi Schmidt (MLPD); Beate Gerke (dieBasis); Berthold Hartmann (B21)
170	Schwalm-Eder	Anna-Maria Bischof	Edgar Franke	Bettina Hoffmann	Albrecht Glaser	Bastian Belz	Heidemarie Scheuch-Paschkewitz	Clara Baumann (PARTEI); Markus Lappe (FW); Hermann-Theodor Ploppa (dieBasis); Alfred Härtzsch (Bündnis C); Alexander Klement (Ind.)
171	Marburg	Stefan Heck	Sören Bartol	Stephanie Theiss	Julian Schmidt	Niklas Hannott	Maximilian Peter	Karin Marinello (MLPD); Rüdiger Schapner (dieBasis); Gökhan Özdemir (Volt); Simon Carstensen (Ind.)
172	Lahn-Dill	Hans-Jürgen Irmer	Dagmar Schmidt	Caroline Krohn	Willi Wagner	Carsten Seelmeyer	Christian Ohnacker	Niklas Hartmann (PARTEI); Karsten Stahl (FW); Heiko Schuster (dieBasis); Manuel Haunsner (Ind.)
173	Gießen	Helge Braun	Felix Döring	Behzad Borhani	Uwe Schulz	Dennis Pucher	Ali Al-Dailami	Darwin Walter (PARTEI); Diego Semmler (FW); Henning Mächerle (DKP); Stephan Krüdener (dieBasis)
174	Fulda	Michael Brand	Birgit Kömpel	Gabriela Zimmermann	Martin Hohmann	Jürgen Lenders	Nuha Sharif-Ali	Peter Klug (FW); Petra Herchenröder (dieBasis); Peter Schäfer-von Reetnitz (Bündnis C); Eva Hemm (Ind.)
175	Main-Kinzig – Wetterau II – Schotten	Johannes Wiegelmann	Bettina Müller	Knut Kiesel	Mariana Harder-Kühnel	Andrea Rahn-Farr	Stella Smith	Carsten Hildebrandt (FW); Brigitte Meyer-Simon (dieBasis)
176	Hochtaunus	Markus Koob	Alicia Bokler	Christian Tramnitz	Henning Thöne	Katja Adler	André Pabst	Hubert Horn (FW); Carsten Baums (Piraten); Thomas Schumbert (dieBasis)
177	Wetterau I	Armin Häuser	Natalie Pawlik	Michaela Colletti	Andreas Lichert	Peter Heidt	Julian Eder	Cenk Gönül (FW); Stephan Flindt (Piraten); Eva Rosen (dieBasis)
178	Rheingau-Taunus – Limburg	Klaus-Peter Willsch	Martin Rabanus	Anna Lührmann	Marcus Resch	Alexander Müller	Zill Valentin	Bianka Rössler (FW); Jens Meyer (dieBasis); Reinhard Seiler (Bündnis C); Carsten Schlossbauer (Ind.)
179	Wiesbaden	Ingmar Jung	Nadine Ruf	Uta Brehm	Erich Heidkamp	Lucas Schwalbach	Daniel Winter	Lukas Haker (PARTEI); Andre Wittmann (FW); Yasmin Schulze (Piraten); Ulrike Fröhlich (dieBasis); Lucien Peter (LKR); Felicitas Klings (PDV); Samater Liban (Volt); Alexander Hartmann (BüSo)
180	Hanau	Katja Leikert	Lennard Oehl	Marcus Bocklet	Erich Albrecht	Henrik Statz	Alexander Kuhne	Christian Clauß (FW); Ralf Haußels (dieBasis); Peter Rehbein (Ind.)
181	Main-Taunus	Norbert Altenkamp	Ilja-Kristin Seewald	Kordula Schulz-Asche	Gerhard Bergmann	Bettina Stark-Watzinger	Paul Laslop	Florian Sauer (PARTEI); Frank Bergmann (FW)
182	Frankfurt am Main I	Axel Kaufmann	Armand Zorn	Deborah Düring	Patrick Schenk	Frank Maiwald	Janine Wissler	Eric Pärisch (FW); Karsten Wappelt (MLPD); Martin Heipertz (dieBasis); Maximilian Zänker (Volt)
183	Frankfurt am Main II	Bettina Wiesmann	Kaweh Mansoori	Omid Nouripour	Joana Cotar	Thorsten Lieb	Achim Kessler	Dieter Breidt (FW); Tufan Aydin (MLPD); Konstantinos Marketakis (dieBasis)
184	Groß-Gerau	Stefan Sauer	Melanie Wegling	Lars Nitschke	Thorsten Blümlein	Stephan Dehler	Jörg Cezanne	Daniel Weber (PARTEI); Achim Weidner (FW); Johannes Rücker (MLPD); Thomas Unverzagt (dieBasis)
185	Offenbach	Björn Simon	Tuna Firat	Wolfgang Strengmann-Kuhn	Christin Thüne	Ernestos Varvaroussis	Christine Buchholz	Stephanie Birkle (PARTEI); Dennis Lehmann (FW); Gregory Engels (Piraten); Stefan Billing (dieBasis); Felix Kautz (Volt)
186	Darmstadt	Astrid Mannes	Andreas Larem	Daniela Wagner	Meysam Ehtemai	Julia von Buttlar	Fırat Turğut-Wenzel	Mario Pingel (PARTEI); Harald Uhl (FW); Anna Schupp (MLPD); Gerold Hiemenz (dieBasis); Mitja Stachowiak (Ind.)
187	Odenwald	Patricia Lips	Jens Zimmermann	Philip Krämer	Georg Hashagen	Mathias Zeuner	Marlene Wenzl	Laura Schulz (FW); Dieter Stein (MLPD); Werner Krebs (dieBasis); Kim Pfaff (Volt)
188	Bergstraße	Michael Meister	Sven Wingerter	Moritz Müller	Thomas Fetsch	Till Mansmann	Sascha Bahl	Kerstin Buchner (FW); Ina Rodewald (dieBasis); Heike Grammbitter (Ind.); Gabriele Ermen (Ind.)

CDU list
#	Candidate	Constituency
1	Helge Braun	Gießen
2	Patricia Lips	Odenwald
3	Michael Meister	Bergstraße
4	Michael Brand	Fulda
5	Katja Leikert	Hanau
6	Armin Schwarz	Waldeck
7	Stefan Heck	Marburg
8	Bettina Wiesmann	Frankfurt am Main II
9	Klaus-Peter Willsch	Rheingau-Taunus – Limburg
10	Markus Koob	Hochtaunus
11	Astrid Mannes	Darmstadt
12	Ingmar Jung	Wiesbaden
13	Hans-Jürgen Irmer	Lahn-Dill
14	Anna-Maria Bischof	Schwalm-Eder
15	Stefan Sauer	Groß-Gerau
16	Norbert Altenkamp	Main-Taunus
17	Björn Simon	Offenbach
18	Michael Aufenanger	Kassel
19	Armin Häuser	Wetterau I
20	Wilhelm Gebhard	Werra-Meißner – Hersfeld-Rotenburg
21	Johannes Wiegelmann	Main-Kinzig – Wetterau II – Schotten
22	Axel Kaufmann	Frankfurt am Main I
23	Ann-Kristin Müller	
24	André Stolz	
25	Albina Nazarenus-Vetter	
26	Kai-Uwe Hemmerich	
27	Christel Gontrum	
28	Johannes Volkmann	
29	Maik Behschad	
30	Pascal Reddig	
31	Christian Wendel	
32	Christoph Fay	
33	Anna-Maria Schölch	
34	Sebastian Sehlbach	
35	Kim-Sarah Speer	
36	Kevin Schmauß	
37	Katharina Wagner	
38	Matthias Hundertmark	
39	Leonie Bierent	
40	Steffen Korell	
41	Kathrin Grüntker	
42	Christoph Lübcke	
43	Jana Edelmann-Rauthe	
44	Jens Seipp	
45	Alexandra Weirich	
46	Anna Schütz	
47	Elke Jesinghausen	
48	Ralph Pittich	
49	Maria Knorr	
50	Thomas Müller	
51	Simon Iolin	
52	Irmgard Klaff-Isselmann	
53	Katja Gehrmann	

SPD list
#	Candidate	Constituency
1	Michael Roth	Werra-Meißner – Hersfeld-Rotenburg
2	Dagmar Schmidt	Lahn-Dill
3	Kaweh Mansoori	Frankfurt am Main II
4	Bettina Müller	Main-Kinzig – Wetterau II – Schotten
5	Sören Bartol	Marburg
6	Natalie Pawlik	Wetterau I
7	Jens Zimmermann	Odenwald
8	Esther Dilcher	Waldeck
9	Martin Rabanus	Rheingau-Taunus – Limburg
10	Nadine Ruf	Wiesbaden
11	Edgar Franke	Schwalm-Eder
12	Ilja-Kristin Seewald	Main-Taunus
13	Tuna Firat	Offenbach
14	Alicia Bokler	Hochtaunus
15	Andreas Larem	Darmstadt
16	Birgit Kömpel	Fulda
17	Felix Döring	Gießen
18	Melanie Wegling	Groß-Gerau
19	Sven Wingerter	Bergstraße
20	Sophie Frühwald	
21	Lennard Oehl	Hanau
22	Hibba Kauser	
23	Armand Zorn	Frankfurt am Main I
24	Serpil Sarikaya	
25	Timon Gremmels	Kassel
26	Tanja Pfenning	
27	Harald Schaaf	
28	Jelena Rothermel	
29	Maximilian Ziegler	
30	Monika Vaupel	
31	Jan Böcher	
32	Yasmin Schilling	
33	René Petzold	
34	Stefanie Minkley	
35	Kevin Trah-Bente	
36	Berivan Tayboga	
37	Patrick Gebauer	
38	Stefanie Kraft	
39	Lukas Becker	
40	Ulrike Schmidbauer	
41	Silke Lüderwald	
42	Nicole Felkl	
43	Cornelia Fürpahs-Zipp	
44	Cornelia Bethke	
45	Stefanie Then	
46	Beate Fischer	
47	Sigrid Sauer	
48	Marianne Wölk	
49	Waltraud Mai-Wehnes	
50	Claudia Sälzer	
51	Monika Oertel	

Green list
#	Candidate	Constituency
1	Bettina Hoffmann	Schwalm-Eder
2	Omid Nouripour	Frankfurt am Main II
3	Kordula Schulz-Asche	Main-Taunus
4	Wolfgang Strengmann-Kuhn	Offenbach
5	Anna Lührmann	Rheingau-Taunus – Limburg
6	Philip Krämer	Odenwald
7	Deborah Düring	Frankfurt am Main I
8	Boris Mijatović	Kassel
9	Awet Tesfaiesus	Werra-Meißner – Hersfeld-Rotenburg
10	Marcus Bocklet	Hanau
11	Kristina Jeromin	
12	Behzad Borhani	Gießen
13	Daniela Wagner	Darmstadt
14	Christian Tramnitz	Hochtaunus
15	Caroline Krohn	Lahn-Dill
16	Moritz Müller	Bergstraße
17	Uta Brehm	Wiesbaden
18	Lars Nitschke	Groß-Gerau
19	Stephanie Theiss	Marburg
20	Ekkehard Darge	
21	Jana Peters	
22	Knut Kiesel	Main-Kinzig – Wetterau II – Schotten
23	Gabriela Zimmermann	Fulda
24	Marcus Schmitt	
25	Isabella McNicol	
26	Jacob Spanke	
27	Michaela Colletti	Wetterau I
28	Thomas Zebunke	
29	Hülya Kiraylar	
30	Robert Schuppan	

AfD list
#	Candidate	Constituency
1	Mariana Harder-Kühnel	Main-Kinzig – Wetterau II – Schotten
2	Joana Cotar	Frankfurt am Main II
3	Uwe Schulz	Gießen
4	Jan Nolte	Waldeck
5	Albrecht Glaser	Schwalm-Eder
6	Martin Hohmann	Fulda
7	Johannes Marxen	
8	Pierre Lamely	
9	Julian Schmidt	Marburg
10	Meysam Ehtemai	Darmstadt
11	Gerhard Bärsch	
12	Markus Fuchs	
13	Karsten Bletzer	
14	Patrick Schenk	Frankfurt am Main I

FDP list
#	Candidate	Constituency
1	Bettina Stark-Watzinger	Main-Taunus
2	Thorsten Lieb	Frankfurt am Main II
3	Till Mansmann	Bergstraße
4	Alexander Müller	Rheingau-Taunus – Limburg
5	Jürgen Lenders	Fulda
6	Katja Adler	Hochtaunus
7	Peter Heidt	Wetterau I
8	Dennis Pucher	Gießen
9	Jochem Rube	Waldeck
10	Julia von Buttlar	Darmstadt
11	Lucas Schwalbach	Wiesbaden
12	Ernestos Varvaroussis	Offenbach
13	Niklas Hannott	Marburg
14	Bastian Belz	Schwalm-Eder
15	Henrik Statz	Hanau
16	Stephan Dehler	Groß-Gerau
17	Jorias Bach	Werra-Meißner – Hersfeld-Rotenburg
18	Andrea Rahn-Farr	Main-Kinzig – Wetterau II – Schotten
19	Mathias Zeuner	Odenwald
20	Carsten Seelmeyer	Lahn-Dill
21	Frank Maiwald	Frankfurt am Main I
22	Matthias Nölke	Kassel

Left list
#	Candidate	Constituency
1	Janine Wissler	Frankfurt am Main I
2	Ali Al-Dailami	Gießen
3	Christine Buchholz	Offenbach
4	Jörg Cezanne	Groß-Gerau
5	Stephanie Schury	Kassel
6	Nuha Sharif-Ali	Fulda
7	Christian Ohnacker	Lahn-Dill
8	Daniel Winter	Wiesbaden
9	Pearl Hahn	
10	Fırat Turğut-Wenzel	Darmstadt
11	Marlene Wenzl	Odenwald
12	Paul Laslop	Main-Taunus
13	Regina Preysing	Waldeck
14	Benjamin Roth	

=== Thuringia ===
#	Constituency	CDU/CSU	SPD	GRÜNE	AfD	FDP	LINKE	Other
189	Eichsfeld – Nordhausen – Kyffhäuserkreis	Manfred Grund	Anne Bressem	Heike Möller	Jürgen Pohl	Patrick Kurth	Sigrud Hupach	Helmut Günther (FW); Katja Staffehl (PARTEI); Marius Braun (ÖDP); Kurt-Peter Kleffel (MLPD); Andreas Schneider (dieBasis)
190	Eisenach – Wartburgkreis – Unstrut-Hainich-Kreis	Christian Hirte	Tina Rudolph	Justus Heuer	Klaus Stöber	Leon Bender	Martina Renner	Andreas Böhme (FW); Stephan Hinze (PARTEI); Peter Schneider (ÖDP); Lea Weinmann (MLPD); Andreas Wolfschlag (dieBasis); Wladislaw Schel (LKR)
191	Jena – Sömmerda – Weimarer Land I	Mike Mohring	Holger Becker	Heiko Knopf	Torben Braga	Tim Wagner	Ralph Lenkert	Marion Schneider (FW); Simon Wagner (PARTEI); Anatole Braungart (MLPD); Karsten Geschwandtner (dieBasis); Frank Wycislok (LKR)
192	Gotha – Ilm-Kreis	Tankred Schipanski	Michael Müller	Stephan Ostermann	Marcus Bühl	Martin Mölders	Cornelia Wanderer	Sylke Mönch (FW); Frank-Peter Prüger (PARTEI); Louisa von Freytag-Löringhoff (MLPD); Sven-Jarno Bien (dieBasis); André Pfannschmidt (Graue); Timo Pradel (Ind.)
193	Erfurt – Weimar – Weimarer Land II	Antje Tillmann	Carsten Schneider	Katrin Göring-Eckardt	Sascha Schlösser	Christian Poloczek-Becher	Susanne Hennig-Wellsow	Sindy Malsch (PARTEI); Tassilo Timm (MLPD); Ulrich Masuth (dieBasis)
194	Gera – Greiz – Altenburger Land	Volkmar Vogel	Elisabeth Kaiser	Doreen Rath	Stephan Brandner	Marco Thiele	Björn Harras	Klaus-Dieter Ilius (MLPD); Günther Langer (dieBasis); Bernd Nebeler (Ind.); Gebhard Berger (Ind.)
195	Saalfeld-Rudolstadt – Saale-Holzland-Kreis – Saale-Orla-Kreis	Albert Weiler	Cornelius Ilgmann	Susanne Martin	Michael Kaufmann	Reginald Hanke	Frank Tempel	Torsten Heilmann (FW); Gerry Fiedler (PARTEI); Michael Gehrmann-Gacasa (ÖDP); Janine Walter-Rupprecht (MLPD); Saskia Graupe (dieBasis)
196	Suhl – Schmalkalden-Meiningen – Hildburghausen – Sonneberg	Hans-Georg Maaßen	Frank Ullrich	Stephanie Erben	Jürgen Treutler	Gerald Ullrich	Sandro Witt	Detlef Pappe (FW); Christian Fichtner (PARTEI); Stefan Schellenberg (ÖDP); Christian Horn (Piraten); Andreas Eifler (MLPD); Marko Bieling (Ind.)

CDU list
#	Candidate	Constituency
1	Christian Hirte	Eisenach – Wartburgkreis – Unstrut-Hainich-Kreis
2	Antje Tillmann	Erfurt – Weimar – Weimarer Land II
3	Volkmar Vogel	Gera – Greiz – Altenburger Land
4	Manfred Grund	Eichsfeld – Nordhausen – Kyffhäuserkreis
5	Tankred Schipanski	Gotha – Ilm-Kreis
6	Kristina Nordt	
7	Mike Mohring	Jena – Sömmerda – Weimarer Land I
8	Albert Weiler	Saalfeld-Rudolstadt – Saale-Holzland-Kreis – Saale-Orla-Kreis
9	Franca Bauernfeind	
10	Cornelius Golembiewski	
11	Christian Klein	
12	Lilia Rau	
13	Hardy Herbert	
14	Konstantin Müller	
15	Hans-Arno Simon	
16	Andreas Kinder	

SPD list
#	Candidate	Constituency
1	Carsten Schneider	Erfurt – Weimar – Weimarer Land II
2	Elisabeth Kaiser	Gera – Greiz – Altenburger Land
3	Frank Ullrich	Suhl – Schmalkalden-Meiningen – Hildburghausen – Sonneberg
4	Tina Rudolph	Eisenach – Wartburgkreis – Unstrut-Hainich-Kreis
5	Holger Becker	Jena – Sömmerda – Weimarer Land I
6	Anne Bressem	Eichsfeld – Nordhausen – Kyffhäuserkreis
7	Michael Müller	Gotha – Ilm-Kreis
8	Cordelius Ilgmann	Saalfeld-Rudolstadt – Saale-Holzland-Kreis – Saale-Orla-Kreis
9	Alexander Meinhardt-Heib	

Green list
#	Candidate	Constituency
1	Katrin Göring-Eckardt	Erfurt – Weimar – Weimarer Land II
2	Heiko Knopf	Jena – Sömmerda – Weimarer Land I
3	Susanne Martin	Saalfeld-Rudolstadt – Saale-Holzland-Kreis – Saale-Orla-Kreis
4	Justus Heuer	Eisenach – Wartburgkreis – Unstrut-Hainich-Kreis
5	Doreen Rath	Gera – Greiz – Altenburger Land
6	Stephan Ostermann	Gotha – Ilm-Kreis
7	Heike Möller	Eichsfeld – Nordhausen – Kyffhäuserkreis
8	Matthias Schlegel	
9	Renate Wittmann	
10	Steven Köhler	
11	Isabell Welle	
12	Holger Haugk	
13	Katharina Pätzold	
14	Hendrik Knop	

AfD list
#	Candidate	Constituency
1	Stephan Brandner	Gera – Greiz – Altenburger Land
2	Jürgen Pohl	Eichsfeld – Nordhausen – Kyffhäuserkreis
3	Michael Kaufmann	Saalfeld-Rudolstadt – Saale-Holzland-Kreis – Saale-Orla-Kreis
4	Torben Braga	Jena – Sömmerda – Weimarer Land I
5	Marcus Bühl	Gotha – Ilm-Kreis
6	Robby Schlund	
7	Anton Friesen	
8	Jürgen Treutler	Suhl – Schmalkalden-Meiningen – Hildburghausen – Sonneberg
9	Sascha Schlösser	Erfurt – Weimar – Weimarer Land II
10	Markus Klimpel	

FDP list
#	Candidate	Constituency
1	Gerald Ullrich	Suhl – Schmalkalden-Meiningen – Hildburghausen – Sonneberg
2	Reginald Hanke	Saalfeld-Rudolstadt – Saale-Holzland-Kreis – Saale-Orla-Kreis
3	Tim Wagner	Jena – Sömmerda – Weimarer Land I
4	Marco Thiele	Gera – Greiz – Altenburger Land
5	Jan Siegemund	
6	Stefanie Hantke	
7	Martin Mölders	Gotha – Ilm-Kreis
8	Christian Poloczek-Becher	Erfurt – Weimar – Weimarer Land II
9	Patrick Kurth	Eichsfeld – Nordhausen – Kyffhäuserkreis
10	Michelle Richter	
11	Sebastian Bethge	
12	Martin Simon	
13	Roberto Daniel	
14	Margot Hirsemann	
15	Hagen Hultzsch	

Left list
#	Candidate	Constituency
1	Susanne Hennig-Wellsow	Erfurt – Weimar – Weimarer Land II
2	Ralph Lenkert	Jena – Sömmerda – Weimarer Land I
3	Martina Renner	Eisenach – Wartburgkreis – Unstrut-Hainich-Kreis
4	Frank Tempel	Saalfeld-Rudolstadt – Saale-Holzland-Kreis – Saale-Orla-Kreis
5	Sigrud Hupach	Eichsfeld – Nordhausen – Kyffhäuserkreis
6	Björn Harras	Gera – Greiz – Altenburger Land
7	Cornelia Wanderer	Gotha – Ilm-Kreis
8	Paul Schwendrat	
9	Sebastian Bach	

=== Rhineland-Palatinate ===
#	Constituency	CDU/CSU	SPD	GRÜNE	AfD	FDP	LINKE	Other
197	Neuwied	Erwin Rüddel	Martin Diedenhofen	Kevin Lenz	Andreas Bleck	Sandra Weeser	Jochen Bülow	Marianne Altgeld (FW); Christian Link (PARTEI); Klaus Asbach (dieBasis); Markus Erdmann (Ind.); Norbert Schmitt (Ind.)
198	Ahrweiler	Mechthild Heil	Christoph Schmitt	Martin Schmitt	Rüdiger Nothnick	Jannick Simon	Aziz Aldemir	Stefan Bernhard Mies (FW); Brigitte Doege (ÖDP); Franz-Gerhard Hoyer (dieBasis); Alina Mandel (Ind.)
199	Koblenz	Josef Oster	Thorsten Rudolph	Lena Etzkorn	Carsten Dittmann	Markus Wieseler	Oliver Antpöhler-Zwiernek	Kathrin Laymann (FW); Michael Brüggemann (PARTEI); Carolin Schmidt (ÖDP); Mark Schneider (dieBasis); Roman Snegur (Volt); Alexandra Sayn (Ind.)
200	Mosel/Rhein-Hunsrück	Marlon Bröhr	Michael Maurer	Julian Joswig	Harald Bechberger	Carina Konrad		Heinz Wößner (FW); Erik Hofmann (ÖDP); Wolfgang Link (dieBasis); Detlef Barsuhn (Volt); Hermann Krämer (Ind.)
201	Kreuznach	Julia Klöckner	Joe Weingarten	Christoph Benze	Nicole Höchst	Marvin Griesbach	Bianca Steimle	Rouven Hebel (FW); Fabian Krug (PARTEI); Eva Eisenhardt-Borsche (ÖDP); Stefan Viehl (dieBasis); Stephan Schlitz (LKR); Ron-David Röder (Volt); Doris Vollmer (Ind.)
202	Bitburg	Patrick Schnieder	Lena Werner	Dorothea Hafner	Beate Härig-Dickersbach	Ralf Berlingen	Manuel Eppers	Petra Fischer (FW); Markus Riebschläger (PARTEI); Clemens Ruhl (ÖDP); Christoph Lutz (dieBasis)
203	Trier	Andreas Steier	Verena Hubertz	Corinna Rüffer	Otto Hiller von Gaertringen	Benjamin Palfner	Katrin Werner	Sascha Kohlmann (FW); Michael Zeeb (PARTEI); Paul Lippl (ÖDP); Anna Batholomé (MLPD); Filiz Plenter (dieBasis); Bettina Wolff (Volt); Simon Becker (DKP); Ingrid Moritz (Ind.); Jens Ahnemüller (Ind.)
204	Montabaur	Andreas Nick	Tanja Machalet	Torsten Klein	Robin Classen	Dennis Sturm	Natalie Brosch	Sascha Kraft (FW); Claudia Boas (PARTEI); Jens-Christian Steuler (dieBasis); Wotan Engels (Ind.)
205	Mainz	Ursula Groden-Kranich	Daniel Baldy	Tabea Rößner	Sebastian Münzenmaier	Klaus Sartorius	Gerhard Trabert	Gerhard Wenderoth (FW); Daniela Zaun (PARTEI); Bodo Noeske (Piraten); Michael Ruf (ÖDP); Jörg Heuser (dieBasis); David Kaufmann (PDV); Florian Köhler-Langes (Volt); Sebastian Seiffert (Ind.); Markus Heil (Ind.)
206	Worms	Jan Metzler	David Maier	Christian Engelke	Carsten Propp	Manuel Höferlin	Anja Läwen	Danniene Wete (FW); Marcus Eschborn (ÖDP); David Hess (dieBasis); Marius Müller (Volt); Chiara Pohl (Ind.)
207	Ludwigshafen/Frankenthal	Torbjörn Kartes	Christian Schreider	Armin Grau	Stefan Scheil	Michael Goldschmidt	Liborio Ciccarello	Hans Arndt (FW); Lieselotte Seiberth (MLPD); Alexander Kiesow (dieBasis); Markus Böhm (LKR); Bernd Hackel (Ind.); Martin Schöne (Ind.); Reiner Bechtel (Ind.)
208	Neustadt – Speyer	Johannes Steiniger	Isabel Mackensen-Geis	Hannah Heller	Thomas Stephan	Bianca Hofmann	Stefan Huber-Aydemir	Stefan Krumm-Dudenhausen (FW); Jürgen Schwerdt (dieBasis); Sebastian Sklubal (Volt); Jonas Wittner (Ind.)
209	Kaiserslautern	Xaver Jung	Matthias Mieves	Michael Kunte	Marco Staudt	Jana Lumbur	Alexander Ulrich	Thomas Lebkücher (FW); Derya Sujana-Şen (PARTEI); Dietrich Schwang (MLPD); Torsten Friedrichs (dieBasis); Petra Winkler (LKR); Patrick Kühn-Breisch (Tierschutz); Malte Schümann (Volt); Dirk Hoppe (Ind.); Marius Lauer (Ind.)
210	Pirmasens	Florian Bilic	Angelika Glöckner	Susanne Bendig	Ferdinand Weber	Erika Watson	Frank Eschrich	Roswitha Jeckel (FW); Marc-Oliver Riedinger (PARTEI); Klaus Dietrich (dieBasis); Barbara Schwarz (Tierschutz); Andreas Winkler (Volt); Verena Hofmann (Ind.)
211	Südpfalz	Thomas Gebhart	Thomas Hitschler	Tobias Lindner	Bernd Schattner	Volker Wissing	Tobias Schreiner	Steffen Weiß (FW); Lukas Rammefanger (PARTEI); Sven Leuthner (ÖDP); Jacqueline Sharma (dieBasis); Bernd Kriebel (Tierschutz); Alexandra Barsuhn (Volt); Cyrus Mobasheri (Ind.); Erdal Koccu (Ind.); Holger Volger (Ind.)

CDU list
#	Candidate	Constituency
1	Julia Klöckner	Kreuznach
2	Patrick Schnieder	Bitburg
3	Thomas Gebhart	Südpfalz
4	Ursula Groden-Kranich	Mainz
5	Mechthild Heil	Ahrweiler
6	Jan Metzler	Worms
7	Erwin Rüddel	Neuwied
8	Johannes Steiniger	Neustadt – Speyer
9	Andreas Nick	Montabaur
10	Torbjörn Kartes	Ludwigshafen/Frankenthal
11	Andreas Steier	Trier
12	Josef Oster	Koblenz
13	Xaver Jung	Kaiserslautern
14	Marlon Bröhr	Mosel/Rhein-Hunsrück
15	Florian Bilic	Pirmasens
16	Kristina Brixius	
17	Michael Korden	
18	Andrea Schmitt	
19	Robert Leonards	
20	Diana Hofmann	
21	Amal Fischer	
22	Lena Hirschinger	
23	Stephanie Balthasar-Schäfer	
24	Jutta Albrecht	
25	Maike Malzahn	
26	Aljoscha Schmidt	
27	Sebastian Borger	
28	Lukas Ellerich	
29	Frank Hoffmann	
30	Vivien Schmitz-Solheid	
31	Caroline Brömmelhues	
32	Maximilian Göbel	
33	Pia Hüsch-Schäfer	
34	Jan Schneider	
35	Marcel Schäfer	
36	Natalie Baum	
37	Carolin Hostert-Hack	
38	Jonas Breßler	
39	Gregory Meyer	
40	Nikolaus Poppitz	

SPD list
#	Candidate	Constituency
1	Thomas Hitschler	Südpfalz
2	Tanja Machalet	Montabaur
3	Thorsten Rudolph	Koblenz
4	Isabel Mackensen-Geis	Neustadt – Speyer
5	Daniel Baldy	Mainz
6	Verena Hubertz	Trier
7	Martin Diedenhofen	Neuwied
8	Angelika Glöckner	Pirmasens
9	Matthias Mieves	Kaiserslautern
10	Lena Werner	Bitburg
11	David Maier	Worms
12	Michael Maurer	Mosel/Rhein-Hunsrück
13	Christian Schreider	Ludwigshafen/Frankenthal
14	Joe Weingarten	Kreuznach
15	Christoph Schmitt	Ahrweiler
16	Jana Schneiß	
17	Janick Schmitz	
18	Theresa Lambrich	
19	Thomas Messer	
20	Marie-Christin Schlüter	
21	Thomas Neises	
22	Heiko Scheib	
23	Jan Hellinghausen	
24	Jochen Geilenkirchen	

Green list
#	Candidate	Constituency
1	Tabea Rößner	Mainz
2	Tobias Lindner	Südpfalz
3	Corinna Rüffer	Trier
4	Armin Grau	Ludwigshafen/Frankenthal
5	Misbah Khan	
6	Julian Joswig	Mosel/Rhein-Hunsrück
7	Hannah Heller	Neustadt – Speyer
8	Martin Schmitt	Ahrweiler
9	Sara Pasuki	
10	Christoph Benze	Kreuznach
11	Andrea Müller-Bohn	
12	Michael Kunte	Kaiserslautern
13	Ricarda Rosemann	
14	Robin Krüger	
15	Claudia Laux	

AfD list
#	Candidate	Constituency
1	Sebastian Münzenmaier	Mainz
2	Nicole Höchst	Kreuznach
3	Andreas Bleck	Neuwied
4	Bernd Schattner	Südpfalz
5	Robin Classen	Montabaur
6	Andreas Wondra	
7	Martin Dames	
8	Boris Schnee	
9	Klaus-Jürgen Hochscheid	
10	Carsten Dittmann	Koblenz

FDP list
#	Candidate	Constituency
1	Volker Wissing	Südpfalz
2	Carina Konrad	Mosel/Rhein-Hunsrück
3	Mario Brandenburg	
4	Sandra Weeser	Neuwied
5	Manuel Höferlin	Worms
6	Bianca Hofmann	Neustadt – Speyer
7	Benjamin Palfner	Trier
8	Markus Wieseler	Koblenz
9	Erika Watson	Pirmasens
10	Michael Goldschmidt	Ludwigshafen/Frankenthal
11	Kerstin Geesdorf	
12	Dennis Sturm	Montabaur
13	Jana Lumbur	Kaiserslautern
14	Klaus Sartorius	Mainz
15	Ralf Berlingen	Bitburg
16	Alexandra Lieb	
17	Christian Kopp	
18	Irene Wach	
19	Andreas Selke	
20	Michael Schwarz	
21	Thomas Bursian	
22	Christian Völker	
23	Tobias Glahn	
24	Emanuel Letz	
25	Tobias Knuth	

Left list
#	Candidate	Constituency
1	Alexander Ulrich	Kaiserslautern
2	Katrin Werner	Trier
3	Bianca Steimle	Kreuznach
4	Jochen Bülow	Neuwied
5	Heike Mehlmann	
6	Liborio Ciccarello	Ludwigshafen/Frankenthal

=== Bavaria ===
#	Constituency	CDU/CSU	SPD	GRÜNE	AfD	FDP	LINKE	Other
212	Altötting	Stephan Mayer	Annette Heidrich	Christoph Arz	Klaus Lang	Sandra Bubendorfer-Licht	Sebastian Misselhorn	Ilse Ertl (FW); Bernhard Suttner (ÖDP); Simon Wahl (BP); Edgar Siemund (dieBasis)
213	Erding – Ebersberg	Andreas Lenz	Magdalena Wagner	Christoph Lochmüller	Peter Junker	Marc Salih	Tobias Boegelein	Birgit Obermaier (FW); Charlotte Schmid (ÖDP); Simone Binder (BP); Alexandra Motschmann (dieBasis)
214	Freising	Erich Irlstorfer	Andreas Mehltretter	Leon Eckert	Johannes Huber	Eva-Maria Schmidt	Nicolas-Pano Graßy	Karl Ecker (FW); Emilia Kirner (ÖDP); Florian Geisenfelder (BP); Daniel Weigelt (PARTEI); Magdalena Lippa (V-Partei3); Karl Reineke (dieBasis); Hans Boljahn (Volt)
215	Fürstenfeldbruck	Katrin Staffler	Michael Schrodi	Beate Walter-Rosenheimer	Florian Jäger	Ulrich Bode	Ernestine Martin-Köppl	Susanne Droth (FW); Stephanie Sichelschmidt (ÖDP); Fabian Handfest (PARTEI); Christian Kreiß (dieBasis); Daniel Burandt (Volt)
216	Ingolstadt	Reinhard Brandl	Jessica Meier	Joachim Siebler	Lukas Rehm	Theresa Ley	Roland Meier	Christian Ponzer (FW); Jakob Sedlmeier (ÖDP); Wolfgang Distler (BP); Sebastian Zahn (PARTEI); Helmut Groß (dieBasis)
217	Munich North	Bernhard Loos	Florian Post	Doris Wagner	Petr Bystron	Daniel Föst	Christian Schwarzenberger	Linus Springer (FW); Beate Merkel (ÖDP); Thomas Kreidemeier (Tierschutz); Maximilian Langenecker (BP); Philipp Rückel (PARTEI); Andreas Naumann (V-Partei3); Birgit Schiel-Zollner (MLPD); Andreas Sönnichsen (dieBasis); Achim Seger (du.); Julia Amtmann (Volt); Martin Hennig (BüSo); Karl Hilz (Ind.)
218	Munich East	Wolfgang Stefinger	Claudia Tausend	Vaniessa Rashid	Wilfried Biedermann	Daniela Hauck	Julian Zieglmaier	Martin Blasi (FW); Rosa Marghescu (ÖDP); Kathrin Schmid (Tierschutz); Mario Gafus (BP); Oliver-Steve Skerlec (PARTEI); Roland Görög (dieBasis); Horst-Jürgen Wodarz (Bündnis C); Jürgen Todenhöfer (Todenhöfer); Lisa Meurer (Volt); Sabine Zuse (BüSo); Simon Klopstock (Ind.)
219	Munich South	Michael Kuffer	Sebastian Roloff	Jamila Schäfer	Wolfgang Wiehle	Thomas Sattelberger	Kerem Schamberger	Loraine Bender-Schwering (FW); Martina Bonertz (ÖDP); Stephanie Weiser (Tierschutz); Anja Mebes (PARTEI); Patrick Ziegler (MLPD); Anna Petukova (dieBasis); Christa Kaiser (BüSo)
220	Munich West/Centre	Stephan Pilsinger	Seija Knorr-Köning	Dieter Janecek	Paul Podolay	Lukas Köhler	Nicole Gohlke	Andreas Staufenbiel (FW); Ben-Said Samani (ÖDP); Susanne Wittmann (Tierschutz); Philipp Drabinski (PARTEI); Angelika Selbmann (V-Partei3); Claudia Roedel (dieBasis); Pia Chojnacki (du.); Sophie Griesbacher (Volt); Werner Zuse (BüSo); Önder-Vedat Dönmez (Ind.); Oskar Sommerfeldt (Ind.)
221	Munich Land	Florian Hahn	Korbinian Rüger	Anton Hofreiter	Gerold Otten	Axel Schmidt	Katinka Burz	Gerhard Kißlinger (FW); Yannick Rouault (ÖDP); Manfred Kellberger (Tierschutz); Stefanie Ruck (BP); Bernhard Senft (PARTEI); Stefan Rode (dieBasis)
222	Rosenheim	Daniela Ludwig	Pankraz Schaberl	Victoria Broßart	Andreas Kohlberger	Michael Linnerer	Ates Gürpinar	Gerhard Schloots (FW); Ludwig Maier (ÖDP); Stephan Fröhlich (BP); Nikolaus Starkmeth (PARTEI); Nino Kornhaß (dieBasis); Gerald Strickner (BüSo)
223	Bad Tölz-Wolfratshausen – Miesbach	Alexander Radwan	Hannes Gräbner	Karl Bär		Béatrice Vesterling	Erich Utz	Christian Kaul (FW); Jan-Philipp van Olfen (ÖDP); Marinus Thurnhuber (BP); Florian Merkl (PARTEI); Susanne Ehlers (dieBasis)
224	Starnberg – Landsberg am Lech	Michael Kießling	Carmen Wegge	Martina Neubauer	Rainer Groß	Britta Hundesrügge	Simone Ketterl	Rasso von Ehrenwiesen (FW); Stella Sadowsky (ÖDP); Christoph Raab (PARTEI); Cornelia Fiegel (V-Partei3); Manfred Heinlein (dieBasis); Joachim Nibbe (Volt)
225	Traunstein	Peter Ramsauer	Bärbel Kofler	Wolfgang Ehrenlechner	Horst Bernshausen	Patrick Weiß	Leon Buchwald	Andrea Wittmann (FW); Bruno Siglreitmaier Jr. (ÖDP); Stefan Glas (BP); Marie Stefan (PARTEI); Martin Hartmann (dieBasis); Sebastian Oberholzner (LKR); Felicitas Englisch (Ind.)
226	Weilheim	Alexander Dobrindt	Sigrid Meierhofer	Elisabeth Löwenbourg-Brzezinski	Gerrit Huy	Karl Sielmann	Rolf Walther	Arnold-Günther Reuss (FW); Maiken Winter (ÖDP); Johann Gattinger (BP); Juina Wessel (dieBasis); Werner Knigge (Volt); Ricard Ryssel (Ind.)
227	Deggendorf	Thomas Erndl	Rita Hagl-Kehl	Matthias Schwinger	Hans Fellner	Muhanad Al-Halak	Melanie Demmelhuber	Martin Behringer (FW); Rolf Sihr (ÖDP); Thomas Pfeffer (BP); Janina Nizik (PARTEI); Josef Reichardt (Piraten); Johann Kiermaier (V-Partei3); Lothar Wandtner (dieBasis)
228	Landshut	Florian Oßner	Vincent Hogenkamp	Maria Krieger	Elena Fritz	Nicole Bauer	Veronika Lackerbauer	Kerstin Haimerl-Kunze (FW); Bernd Wimmer (ÖDP); Gertraud Götz-Volkmann (Tierschutz); Robert Neuhauser (BP); Marion Schmidt (dieBasis); Gerhard Pettenkoffer (Ind.); Robert Manz (Ind.)
229	Passau	Andreas Scheuer	Johannes Schätzl	Stefanie Auer	Ralf Stadler	Martin Probst	Josef Ilsanker	Roswitha Toso (FW); Johanna Seitz (ÖDP); Christian Boiger (PARTEI); Leo Frankl (dieBasis); Michael Ziegelmeir (PDV)
230	Rottal-Inn	Max Straubinger	Severin Eder	Marlene Schönberger	Stephan Protschka	Claus Rothlehner	Rudolf Schöberl	Werner Schießl (FW); Daniela Blankenburg (ÖDP); Anton Maller (BP); Robert Tolksdorf (PARTEI); Eva Maria Ströhm (dieBasis)
231	Straubing	Alois Rainer	Dennis Schötz	Erhard Grundl	Corinna Miazga	Klaus Herpel	Maximilian Spielbauer	Helmut Muhr (FW); Michael Hirtreiter (ÖDP); Thomas Schmid (BP); Marco Schmipfhauser (PARTEI); Tobias Huf (dieBasis); Johann Janik (Todenhöfer); Thomas Knott (Ind.)
232	Amberg	Susanne Hierl	Johannes Foitzik	Karl-Heinz Herbst	Peter Boehringer	Nils Gründer	Markus Sendelbeck	Daisy Miranda (FW); Susanne Witt (ÖDP); Alwin Baumert (dieBasis); Nikolaus Gradl (Ind.)
233	Regensburg	Peter Aumer	Carolin Wagner	Stefan Schmidt	Dieter Arnold	Ulrich Lechte	Eva-Maria Schreiber	Rainer-Michael Rößler (FW); Robert Fischer (ÖDP); Andreas Schambeck (BP); Romy Freund (PARTEI); Jörg Brunschweiger (dieBasis); Roland Gruber (LKR); Jakob Friedl (Ind.)
234	Schwandorf	Martina Englhardt-Kopf	Marianne Schieder	Tina Winklmann	Wolfgang Pöschl	Ines Tegtmeier	Manfred Preischl	Christian Schindler (FW); Sönke Siebold (ÖDP); Constanze Beck (V-Partei3); Andreas Duschinger (dieBasis); Thomas Faltermeier (LKR)
235	Weiden	Albert Rupprecht	Uli Grötsch	Anneliese Droste	Manfred Schiller	Silke Klotz	Christian Weidner	Tobias Groß (FW); Christian Wallmeyer (ÖDP); Roland Bayer (BP); Dietmar Assel (dieBasis); Helmut Bauer (Ind.); Konrad Dippel (Ind.)
236	Bamberg	Thomas Silberhorn	Andreas Schwarz	Lisa Badum	Michael Weiß	Sven Bachmann	Jan Jaegers	Jens Herzog (FW); Lisa Lösel (ÖDP); Thomas Dotzler (BP); Paul Mari (PARTEI); Therese Gmelch (MLPD); Sabine Wezel (dieBasis); Hans-Günter Brünker (Volt); Andreas Roensch (Ind.)
237	Bayreuth	Silke Launert	Anette Kramme	Susanne Bauer	Tobias Peterka	Thomas Hacker	Sven Schröder	Corey Dressendörfer (FW); Dominic Hopp (ÖDP); Florens Weiß (PARTEI); Markus Engel (dieBasis)
238	Coburg	Jonas Geissler	Ramona Brehm	Johannes Wagner	Sebastian Görtler	Jan-Uwe Peter	Ulf Wunderlich	Rainer Möbus (FW); Tristan Wolf (ÖDP); Andre Wächter (BP); Tim Ströhlein (PARTEI); Tim Ströhlein (MLPD); Nicole Fredriksen (dieBasis)
239	Hof	Hans-Peter Friedrich	Jörg Nürnberger	Ralf Reusch	Gerd Kögler	Gabriel Wölfel	Janson Damasceno	Thomas Schinner (FW); Roland Müller (ÖDP); Steffen Pokorny (PARTEI); Walter Kunisch (dieBasis); Verena Thümmel (Bündnis C); Martin Löhnert (Ind.)
240	Kulmbach	Emmi Zeulner	Simon Moritz	Martin Pfeiffer	Theo Taubmann	Claus Ehrhardt	Ludwig Baumgartner	Jochen Bergmann (FW); Kay-Uwe Zenker (ÖDP); Gunther Sedlmeyer (BP); Sven Goller (PARTEI); Otto Gebelein (dieBasis)
241	Ansbach	Artur Auernhammer	Harry Scheuenstuhl	Herbert Sirois	Daniel Lösch	Thomas Kestler	Erkan Dinar	Sylvia Bogenreuther (FW); Kilian Welser (ÖDP); Markus Wanger (Piraten); Maik Langen (NPD); Markus Engelhardt (dieBasis)
242	Erlangen	Stefan Müller	Martina Stamm-Fibich	Tina Prietz	Christian Beßler	Ralf Schwab		Anna-Carina Häußler (FW); Christian Stadelmann (ÖDP); Stefan Müller (PARTEI); Jürgen Purzner (Piraten); Richard Straub (MLPD); Torsten Weber (dieBasis); Adam Kunstmann (Ind.); Rüdiger Kalupner (Ind.); Susanne Henig (Ind.)
243	Fürth	Tobias Winkler	Carsten Träger	Uwe Kekeritz	Thomas Klaukien	Daniel Bayer	Hermann Ruttmann	Stefan Mielchen (FW); Klaus John (ÖDP); Fatimah Brendecke (BP); Catalina Walther (PARTEI); Katrin Reber (dieBasis); Stephan Wiedenmann (PDV); Andreas Schmidtell (Volt)
244	Nuremberg North	Sebastian Brehm	Gabriela Heinrich	Tessa Ganserer	Martin Sichert	Katja Hessel	Titus Schüller	Thomas Estrada (FW); Christian Rechholz (ÖDP); Lukas Küffner (Piraten); Michel Barimis (MLPD); Klaus Kinzel (dieBasis); Christian Penninger (Volt); Markus Eppel (Ind.)
245	Nuremberg South	Michael Frieser	Thomas Grämmer	Sascha Müller	Matthias Vogler	Marco Preißinger	Kathrin Gomez	Sonja Mack (FW); Claudia Zankl (ÖDP); Karoline Polster-Strobl (dieBasis); Deniz Çelik (Volt)
246	Roth	Ralph Edelhäußer	Jan Plobner	Felix Erbe	Klaus Norgall	Kristine Lütke	Evelyn Schötz	Felix Locke (FW); Pascal Henninger (ÖDP); Max Weggenmann (PARTEI); Julian Häffner (Piraten); Stefan Kuschel (dieBasis); Marcus Nehring (LKR); Udo Schlot (Ind.)
247	Aschaffenburg	Andrea Lindholz	Tobias Wüst	Niklas Wagener	Jörg Baumann	Karsten Klein	Florian Hofmann	Benjamin Withauer (FW); Katharina Dehn (ÖDP); Andreas Reiniger (BP); Andreas Portscher (PARTEI); Bendrick Arnold (MLPD); Sylvia Pflug (dieBasis); Holger Stenger (LKR); Ralf Lembach (Ind.)
248	Bad Kissingen	Dorothee Bär	Sabine Dittmar	Manuela Rottmann	Freia Lippold-Eggen	Graf Karl von Stauffenberg	Claus Scheeres	Frank Helmerich (FW); Michaela Reinhard (ÖDP); Sonja Johannes (PARTEI); Marco Garnache (dieBasis)Michael Kaiser (Ind.)
249	Main-Spessart	Alexander Hoffmann	Bernd Rützel	Armin Beck	René Jentzsch	Werner Jannek	Andreas Adrian	Jessica Klug (FW); Wolfgang Winter (ÖDP); Sabine Schmitt (dieBasis); Daniel Roth (LKR)
250	Schweinfurt	Anja Weisgerber	Markus Hümpfer	Nicolas Lommatzsch	Bernd Schuhmann	Daniel Stark	Klaus Ernst	Andrea Graham (FW); Stefan Hrnicek-Hubert (ÖDP); Cedrick Van Huet (BP); Manfred Setter (MLPD); Pasquale Trasente (dieBasis); Herbert Lorey (Unabhängige)
251	Würzburg	Paul Lehrieder	Freya Altenhöner	Sebastian Hansen		Andrew Ullmann	Simone Barrientos	Robert Starosta (FW); Stefanie Wierlemann (ÖDP); Robert Hämmelmann (dieBasis); Thomas Herter (PDV); Horst Schürer (Ind.)
252	Augsburg-Stadt	Volker Ullrich	Ulrike Bahr	Claudia Roth	Raimond Scheirich	Alexander Meyer	Maximilian Hintermayr	Bernhard Müller (FW); Alexander Mai (ÖDP); Anton Steinböck (BP); Roland Kurschat (PARTEI); Anna Weingart (V-Partei3); Emil Bauer (MLPD); Klaus Jaeger (dieBasis); Nelly Rüttiger (Volt); Alexandra Kolb (Ind.); Ediz Sirin (Ind.)
253	Augsburg-Land	Hansjörg Durz	Heike Heubach	Stefan Lindauer	Rainer Kraft	Matthias Krause	Cengiz Tuncer	Marina Jakob (FW); Thomas Lidl (ÖDP); Alexander Denner (dieBasis); Sami Baydar (Ind.)
254	Donau-Ries	Ulrich Lange	Christoph Schmid	Stefan Norder	Edeltraud Schwarz	Marcus Schürdt	Manfred Seel	Ulrich Reiner (FW); Dieter Feldmeier (ÖDP); Kristin Burger (V-Partei3); Dagmar Riesner (dieBasis); Erich Zühlke (LKR); Harald Gerke (Unabhängige)
255	Neu-Ulm	Alexander Engelhard	Karl-Heinz Brunner	Ekin Deligöz	Gerd Mannes	Anke Hillmann-Richter	Xaver Merk	Daniel Mayer (FW); Krimhilde Dornach (ÖDP); Bastian Röhm (Tierschutz); Philipp Meier (Piraten); Roman Albrecht (dieBasis); Martin Lipp (Volt); Martin Langhans (Ind.)
256	Oberallgäu	Mechthilde Wittmann	Martin Holderied	Pius Bandte	Rainer Rothfuß	Stephan Thomae	Engelbert Blessing	Annette Hauser-Felberbaum (FW); Franz Natterer-Babych (ÖDP); Tommy Schwellinger (PARTEI); Marcel Frey (V-Partei3); Dietrich Busacker (dieBasis); Alfred Dorn (Ind.)
257	Ostallgäu	Stephan Stracke	Regina Leenders	Daniel Pflügl	Christian Sedlmeir	Kai Fackler	Susanne Ferschl	Mariana Braunmiller (FW); Alexander Abt (ÖDP); Christian Armster (PARTEI); Christiana Hofer (V-Partei3); Florian Mayr (dieBasis)

CSU list
#	Candidate	Constituency
1	Alexander Dobrindt	Weilheim
2	Dorothee Bär	Bad Kissingen
3	Andreas Scheuer	Passau
4	Daniela Ludwig	Rosenheim
5	Hans-Peter Friedrich	Hof
6	Andrea Lindholz	Aschaffenburg
7	Florian Hahn	Munich Land
8	Anja Weisgerber	Schweinfurt
9	Stefan Müller	Erlangen
10	Emmi Zeulner	Kulmbach
11	Michael Kuffer	Munich South
12	Martina Englhardt-Kopf	Schwandorf
13	Michael Frieser	Nuremberg South
14	Mechthilde Wittmann	Oberallgäu
15	Sebastian Brehm	Nuremberg North
16	Silke Launert	Bayreuth
17	Stephan Pilsinger	Munich West/Centre
18	Katrin Staffler	Fürstenfeldbruck
19	Volker Ullrich	Augsburg-Stadt
20	Susanne Hierl	Amberg
21	Bernhard Loos	Munich North
22	Stefanie Hümpfner	
23	Bernd Fabritius	
24	Gudrun Zollner	
25	Konrad Baur	
26	Barbara Gerl	
27	Reiner Meier	
28	Cornelia Griesbeck	
29	Markus Täuber	
30	Caroline Brielmair	
31	Florian Fleig	
32	Ulrike Grimm	
33	Paul Lehrieder	Würzburg
34	Anna-Maria Auerhahn	
35	Tobias Winkler	Fürth
36	Laura Wastlhuber	
37	Alexander Zink	
38	Stefanie Dippl	
39	Huberth Rosner	
40	Anna Hajek	
41	Daniel Blech	
42	Julia Grote	
43	Carlo Schöpp	
44	Julia Lang	
45	Marco Gmelch	
46	Bettina Werner	
47	Johannes Wolfrum	
48	Tina Pickert	
49	Niklas Neumeyer	
50	Birgit Barth	
51	Manuel Blenk	
52	Astrid Meyer-Bülow	
53	Simon Ettl	
54	Nina Bezold	
55	Lucas Reisacher	
56	Veronika Schraut	
57	Markus Stumpf	
58	Michelle Fall	
59	Florentin Siegert	
60	Anna Schmitt	
61	Tobias Kurzmaier	
62	Sabrina Stemplowski	
63	Quentin Wolf	
64	Nicole Alesik	
65	Peter Brandner	
66	Dorothea Deneke-Stoll	
67	Michael Sauer	
68	Franziska Geß	
69	Nico Kauper	
70	Susanne Herding	
71	Christian Machon	
72	Anne-Marie Karam	
73	David Fink	
74	Ursula Henseler	
75	Markus Hartmann	
76	Dagmar Nachtigall	
77	Florian Füger	
78	Jessica Schilling	
79	Christoph Mettel	
80	Kathrin Grosch	
81	Moritz Meyer	
82	Anja Burkhardt	
83	Stefan Kluge	
84	Jasmin Roth	
85	Michael Hofmann	
86	Christine Feiler	
87	Julian Seelig	
88	Michaela Frauendorfer	
89	Thomas Buchner	
90	Regina Wenzl	
91	Richard Redlingshöfer	
92	Monika Simon-Deinlein	

SPD list
#	Candidate	Constituency
1	Uli Grötsch	Weiden
2	Bärbel Kofler	Traunstein
3	Carsten Träger	Fürth
4	Anette Kramme	Bayreuth
5	Sebastian Roloff	Munich South
6	Rita Hagl-Kehl	Deggendorf
7	Bernd Rützel	Main-Spessart
8	Gabriela Heinrich	Nuremberg North
9	Christoph Schmid	Donau-Ries
10	Claudia Tausend	Munich East
11	Andreas Schwarz	Bamberg
12	Marianne Schieder	Schwandorf
13	Michael Schrodi	Fürstenfeldbruck
14	Sabine Dittmar	Bad Kissingen
15	Andreas Mehltretter	Freising
16	Ulrike Bahr	Augsburg-Stadt
17	Johannes Schätzl	Passau
18	Martina Stamm-Fibich	Erlangen
19	Jörg Nürnberger	Hof
20	Carmen Wegge	Starnberg – Landsberg am Lech
21	Markus Hümpfer	Schweinfurt
22	Carolin Wagner	Regensburg
23	Jan Plobner	Roth
24	Heike Heubach	Augsburg-Land
25	Hannes Gräbner	Bad Tölz-Wolfratshausen – Miesbach
26	Ramona Brehm	Coburg
27	Severin Eder	Rottal-Inn
28	Magdalena Wagner	Erding – Ebersberg
29	Johannes Foitzik	Amberg
30	Freya Altenhöner	Würzburg
31	Thomas Grämmer	Nuremberg South
32	Seija Knorr-Köning	Munich West/Centre
33	Harry Scheuenstuhl	Ansbach
34	Regina Leenders	Ostallgäu
35	Simon Moritz	Kulmbach
36	Annette Heidrich	Altötting
37	Tobias Wüst	Aschaffenburg
38	Sigrid Meierhofer	Weilheim
39	Vincent Hogenkamp	Landshut
40	Jessica Meier	Ingolstadt
41	Martin Holderied	Oberallgäu
42	Pankraz Schaberl	Rosenheim
43	Dennis Schötz	Straubing
44	Christian Wenzel	
45	Stefan Werner	
46	Alexander Klehr	

Green list
#	Candidate	Constituency
1	Claudia Roth	Augsburg-Stadt
2	Anton Hofreiter	Munich Land
3	Ekin Deligöz	Neu-Ulm
4	Dieter Janecek	Munich West/Centre
5	Manuela Rottmann	Bad Kissingen
6	Sascha Müller	Nuremberg South
7	Jamila Schäfer	Munich South
8	Erhard Grundl	Straubing
9	Lisa Badum	Bamberg
10	Stefan Schmidt	Regensburg
11	Saskia Weishaupt	
12	Karl Bär	Bad Tölz-Wolfratshausen – Miesbach
13	Tessa Ganserer	Nuremberg North
14	Niklas Wagener	Aschaffenburg
15	Marlene Schönberger	Rottal-Inn
16	Johannes Wagner	Coburg
17	Tina Winklmann	Schwandorf
18	Leon Eckert	Freising
19	Beate Walter-Rosenheimer	Fürstenfeldbruck
20	Uwe Kekeritz	Fürth
21	Elisabeth Löwenbourg-Brzezinski	Weilheim
22	Margarete Bause	
23	Wiebke Richter	
24	Daniel Pflügl	Ostallgäu
25	Victoria Broßart	Rosenheim
26	Sebastian Hansen	Würzburg
27	Doris Wagner	Munich North
28	Maria Krieger	Landshut
29	Tina Prietz	Erlangen
30	Anna-Maria Lanzinger	
31	Martina Neubauer	Starnberg – Landsberg am Lech
32	Susanne Bauer	Bayreuth
33	Stefanie Auer	Passau
34	Pius Bandte	Oberallgäu
35	Corinna Ullrich	
36	Herbert Sirois	Ansbach
37	Vaniessa Rashid	Munich East
38	Christoph Lochmüller	Erding – Ebersberg
39	Maria Wißmiller	
40	Felix Erbe	Roth
41	Anneliese Droste	Weiden
42	Joachim Siebler	Ingolstadt
43	Isabell Löschner	
44	Peter Heilrath	
45	Andrea Rauch	
46	Stefan Lindauer	Augsburg-Land
47	Agnes Krumwiede	
48	Matthias Schwinger	Deggendorf
49	Sabeeka Gangjee-Well	
50	Karl-Heinz Herbst	Amberg
51	Erna-Kathrein Groll	
52	Christoph Arz	Altötting
53	Antje Laux	
54	Wolfgang Ehrenlechner	Traunstein
55	Lakhena Leng	
56	Armin Beck	Main-Spessart
57	Lisa Renz-Hübner	
58	Stefan Norder	Donau-Ries
59	Eveline Kuhnert	
60	Ralf Reusch	Hof
61	Ursula Frank-Mayer	
62	Martin Pfeiffer	Kulmbach
63	Ina Hofmann	
64	Ruprecht Steinhübl	

AfD list
#	Candidate	Constituency
1	Peter Boehringer	Amberg
2	Corinna Miazga	Straubing
3	Stephan Protschka	Rottal-Inn
4	Petr Bystron	Munich North
5	Martin Sichert	Nuremberg North
6	Johannes Huber	Freising
7	Wolfgang Wiehle	Munich South
8	Rainer Kraft	Augsburg-Land
9	Gerold Otten	Munich Land
10	Tobias Peterka	Bayreuth
11	Peter Felser	
12	Gerrit Huy	Weilheim
13	Rainer Rothfuß	Oberallgäu
14	Klaus Lang	Altötting
15	Manfred Schiller	Weiden
16	Gerd Kögler	Hof
17	Christian Beßler	Erlangen
18	Peter Junker	Erding – Ebersberg
19	Lukas Rehm	Ingolstadt
20	Bernd Schuhmann	Schweinfurt
21	Andreas Kohlberger	Rosenheim
22	Michael Weiß	Bamberg
23	Wolfgang Pöschl	Schwandorf
24	Horst Bernshausen	Traunstein
25	Raimond Scheirich	Augsburg-Stadt
26	Elena Fritz	Landshut

FDP list
#	Candidate	Constituency
1	Daniel Föst	Munich North
2	Katja Hessel	Nuremberg North
3	Karsten Klein	Aschaffenburg
4	Lukas Köhler	Munich West/Centre
5	Thomas Sattelberger	Munich South
6	Stephan Thomae	Oberallgäu
7	Nicole Bauer	Landshut
8	Ulrich Lechte	Regensburg
9	Sandra Bubendorfer-Licht	Altötting
10	Andrew Ullmann	Würzburg
11	Maximilian Funke-Kaiser	
12	Kristine Lütke	Roth
13	Thomas Hacker	Bayreuth
14	Muhanad Al-Halak	Deggendorf
15	Nils Gründer	Amberg
16	Ulrich Bode	Fürstenfeldbruck
17	Ines Tegtmeier	Schwandorf
18	Britta Hundesrügge	Starnberg – Landsberg am Lech
19	Marc Salih	Erding – Ebersberg
20	Theresa Ley	Ingolstadt
21	Axel Schmidt	Munich Land
22	Graf Karl von Stauffenberg	Bad Kissingen
23	Michael Linnerer	Rosenheim
24	Eva-Maria Schmidt	Freising
25	Béatrice Vesterling	Bad Tölz-Wolfratshausen – Miesbach
26	Marco Preißinger	Nuremberg South
27	Daniela Hauck	Munich East
28	Philip Hackemann	
29	Patrick Weiß	Traunstein
30	Huu Loi Vo	
31	Anke Hillmann-Richter	Neu-Ulm
32	Matthias Krause	Augsburg-Land
33	Gabriel Wölfel	Hof
34	Tarek Carls-Littwin	
35	Katharina Diem	
36	Alexander Meyer	Augsburg-Stadt
37	Claus Rothlehner	Rottal-Inn
38	Daniel Bayer	Fürth
39	Martin Probst	Passau
40	Kai Fackler	Ostallgäu
41	Ilka Enger	
42	Werner Jannek	Main-Spessart
43	Silke Klotz	Weiden
44	Sascha Renner	
45	Thomas Jännert	
46	Michael Limmer	
47	Marcus Schürdt	Donau-Ries
48	Ulla Schäfer	
49	Karl Sielmann	Weilheim
50	Mathias Baur	
51	Birgit Kerckhoff	
52	Isabelle Schweitzer	
53	Klaus Herpel	Straubing
54	Sven Bachmann	Bamberg
55	Jan-Uwe Peter	Coburg
56	Simon Roloff	
57	Stefanie Wagner-Schroiff	
58	Ralf Schwab	Erlangen
59	Dominik Winkel	
60	Florian Wittmann	
61	Daniel Stark	Schweinfurt
62	Jens Rohn	
63	Karl Hauser	
64	Claus Ehrhardt	Kulmbach
65	Jörg Heimbeck	
66	Frank Sommerfeld	
67	Philipp Karlsson	
68	Julian Kleber	
69	Rolf-Peter Döll	
70	Sascha Anton	
71	Martin Koske	

Left list
#	Candidate	Constituency
1	Nicole Gohlke	Munich West/Centre
2	Klaus Ernst	Schweinfurt
3	Susanne Ferschl	Ostallgäu
4	Ates Gürpinar	Rosenheim
5	Simone Barrientos	Würzburg
6	Titus Schüller	Nuremberg North
7	Eva Schreiber	Regensburg
8	Maximilian Hintermayr	Augsburg-Stadt
9	Kathrin Gomez	Nuremberg South
10	Hermann Ruttmann	Fürth
11	Evelyn Schötz	Roth
12	Kerem Schamberger	Munich South
13	Margarita Kavali	
14	Lukas Eitel	
15	Josephine Taucher	
16	Malik Diao	
17	Veronika Lackerbauer	Landshut
18	Nicolas-Pano Graßy	Freising
19	Simone Ketterl	Starnberg – Landsberg am Lech
20	Janson Damasceno	Hof
21	Katinka Burz	Munich Land
22	Tobias Boegelein	Erding – Ebersberg
23	Hanna Wanke	
24	Jason Seger	
25	Sarah Eichberg	
26	Engelbert Blessing	Oberallgäu

=== Baden-Württemberg ===
#	Constituency	CDU/CSU	SPD	GRÜNE	AfD	FDP	LINKE	Other
258	Stuttgart I	Stefan Kaufmann	Lucia Schanbacher	Cem Özdemir	Dirk Spaniel	Judith Skudelny	Bernd Riexinger	Marcel Krohn (Tierschutz); Xenia Lehmann (PARTEI); Klaus Wirthwein (FW); Heinz Jabokeit (DiB); Julia Scheller (MLPD); Miriam Nikola (dieBasis); Ralph Schertlen (Bewegung); Berthold Stegemann (PDV); Julia Böcklen (Volt); Marc Schuller (BüSo); Werner Ressdorf (Ind.)
259	Stuttgart II	Maximilian Mörseburg	Dejan Perc	Anna Christmann	Michael Mayer	Timur Lutfullin	Johanna Tiarks	Matthias Gottfried (Tierschutz); Fabian Westenberg (PARTEI); Ralf Wendel (FW); Volker Kraft (MLPD); Thomas Kucher (dieBasis); René Greiner (Bewegung); Konstantin Ksensow (PDV); Jan König (Volt); Christoph Mohs (BüSo); Erkan Demir (Ind.)
260	Böblingen	Marc Biadacz	Jasmina Hostert	Tobias Bacherle	Markus Frohnmaier	Florian Toncar	Richard Pitterle	Tim Manojlović (PARTEI); Norbert Volz (FW); André Mondry (ÖDP); Guido Drehsen (DiB); Johanna Jäckh-Vermeulen (MLPD); Annabel Jones (dieBasis); Birgit Seibel (Volt); Friedhild Miller (Ind.); Hans Tolzin (Ind.)
261	Esslingen	Markus Grübel	Argyri Paraschaki	Sebastian Schäfer	Boris Malewski	Robert Langer	Anil Beşli	Daniela Negt (PARTEI); Holger Fritz (FW); Hubert Bauer (MLPD); Stefan Zweifel (dieBasis); Wolfgang Hamberger (PDV); Andreas Jakobi (Volt)
262	Nürtingen	Michael Hennrich	Nils Schmid	Matthias Gastel	Kerstin Hanske	Renata Alt	Hüseyin Sahin	Daniel Friesch (PARTEI); Markus Mangold (FW); Sigrid Ott (DiB); Dieter Rupp (MLPD); Ilona Timmermann (dieBasis)
263	Göppingen	Hermann Färber	Heike Baehrens	Viktoria Kruse	Volker Münz	Jan Olsson	Eva-Maria Glathe-Braun	Christian Treder (PARTEI); Andreas Cerrotta (FW); Christel Beck (MLPD); Karlheinz Siegmund (dieBasis)
264	Waiblingen	Christina Stumpp	Urs Abelein	Annedore Kowatsch	Jürgen Braun	Stephan Seiter	Luigi Pantisano	Friedrich Häfner (PARTEI); Volker Hepp (FW); Kai Dorra (DiB); Dieter Böttcher (MLPD); Brigitte Aldinger (dieBasis); Anna Schorn (Volt)
265	Ludwigsburg	Steffen Bilger	Macit Karaahmetoǧlu	Sandra Detzer	Martin Hess	Oliver Martin	Andreas Frisch	Emanuele Annunziata (PARTEI); Martin Pfaff (FW); Michael Dornhausen (ÖDP); Stephan Johne (dieBasis); Jördis Hollnagel (Volt); David Gibanica (Ind.); Jakob Novotny (Ind.)
266	Neckar-Zaber	Fabian Gramling	Thomas Utz	Lars Schweizer	Marc Jongen	Marcel Distl	Emma Weber	Alexander Wezel (PARTEI); Jan Rittaler (FW); Gerd Bogisch (ÖDP); Wolfgang Schaible (DiB); Sven Kerzel (dieBasis); Werner Hartmann (Ind.)
267	Heilbronn	Alexander Throm	Josip Juratovic	Isabell Steidel	Franziska Gminder	Michael Georg Link	Konrad Wanner	Milena Götz (PARTEI); Uwe Basler (FW); Peter Rügner (MLPD); Dirk Piper (dieBasis); Markus Schneider (PDV)
268	Schwäbisch Hall – Hohenlohe	Christian von Stetten	Kevin Leiser	Harald Ebner	Jens Moll	Valentin Abel	Cedric Schiele	Knud Wetzel (PARTEI); Jürgen Braun (FW); Friedrich Zahn (ÖDP); Wilhelm Maier (MLPD); Marcus Rohrbach (dieBasis)
269	Backnang – Schwäbisch Gmünd	Ingeborg Gräßle	Tim-Luka Schwab	Ricarda Lang	Andreas Wörner	David-Sebastian Hamm	Annette Keles	Michael Schoder (PARTEI); Gabriele Regele (FW); Marianne Kolb (MLPD); Stefan Schmidt (dieBasis)
270	Aalen – Heidenheim	Roderich Kiesewetter	Leni Breymaier	Margit Stumpp	Jan-Hendrik Czada	Arian Kriesch	Tim Steckbauer	Alexander Ortmann (PARTEI); Peter Koptisch (FW); Roland Maier (MLPD); Steffen Weller (dieBasis); Pia Großer (Volt)
271	Karlsruhe-Stadt	Ingo Wellenreuther	Parsa Marvi	Zoe Mayer	Marc Bernhard	Michael Theurer	Michel Brandt	Daniel Barth (PARTEI); Bernhard Barutta (FW); Franz-Josef Behr (ÖDP); Jonas Dachner (MLPD); Martin Buchfink (dieBasis); Klaus-Jürgen Raphael (Bündnis C); Andreas Schäfer (PDV); Tassi Giannikopoulos (Volt); Markus Schmoll (Klimaliste)
272	Karlsruhe-Land	Nicolas Zippelius	Patrick Diebold	Sebastian Grässer	René Rotzinger	Hans-Günther Lohr	Jörg Rupp	David Braitmaier (PARTEI); Steffen Schmid (FW); Georg Austermann (ÖDP); Ralf Baßler (dieBasis); Niklas Goerke (PDV); Heidemarie Mund (Ind.)
273	Rastatt	Kai Whittaker	Gabriele Katzmarek	Thomas Gönner	Verena Bäuerle	Sven Gehrke	Tudor Costin	Lara Schindler (FW); Wolfgang Rapps (MLPD); Marion Hofmann (dieBasis); Robin Gscheidle (Volt); Günther Beikert (Klimaliste)
274	Heidelberg	Alexander Föhr	Elisabeth Krämer	Franziska Brantner	Malte Kaufmann	Dennis Nusser	Zara Kızıltaş	Franziskus Schmitz (PARTEI); Daniel Brenzel (FW); Bernhard Schweigert (MLPD); Ulrich Becker (dieBasis); Wasilios Vlachopoulos (PDV); Verena Willaredt (Volt); Friederike Benjes (Klimaliste)
275	Mannheim	Roland Hörner	Isabel Cademartori	Melis Sekmen	Jörg Finkler	Konrad Stockmeier	Gökay Akbulut	Simon Matheis (PARTEI); Stephan Frauenkron (FW); Joachim Förster (ÖDP); Josef Buck (MLPD); Lars Ebert (dieBasis); Johanna Legnar (Klimaliste)
276	Odenwald – Tauber	Nina Warken	Anja Lotz	Charlotte Schneidewind-Hartnagel	Christina Baum	Timo Breuninger	Robert Binder	Dominik Leuser (PARTEI); Stefan Grimm (FW); Dieter Schwarz (dieBasis)
277	Rhein-Neckar	Moritz Oppelt	Lars Castellucci	Jürgen Kretz	Stefan Holzmann	Jens Brandenburg	Ecevit Emre	Domenic Arnold (FW); Michael Dietz (dieBasis); Daniel Schmitt (Ind.)
278	Bruchsal – Schwetzingen	Olav Gutting	Nezaket Yildirim	Nicole Heger	Ruth Rickersfeld	Christopher Gohl	Alena Schmitt	Gerd Wolf (PARTEI); Alexander Geyer (FW); Frank Theis (dieBasis); Jonas Fritsch (Ind.)
279	Pforzheim	Gunther Krichbaum	Katja Mast	Stephanie Aeffner	Diana Zimmer	Rainer Semet	Meltem Çelik	Matthias Ebner (Tierschutz); Alexander Krenz (PARTEI); Sabine Zeitler (FW); Siegmar Herrlinger (MLPD); Susanne Dufke (dieBasis); Andreas Kubisch (Bewegung)
280	Calw	Klaus Mack	Saskia Esken	Sara Haug	Marcus Lotzin	Michael König	Thomas Hanser	Dirk Witzelmaier (Tierschutz); Yvonne Vogler (PARTEI); Markus Mast (FW); Egon Nagel (dieBasis); Frank Negwer (LKR); Tina Frey (Klimaliste)
281	Freiburg	Matern von Marschall	Julia Söhne	Chantal Kopf	Marco Näger	Claudia Raffelhüschen	Tobias Pflüger	Hanna Kohl (PARTEI); Anke Glenz (FW); Mira Kaizl (MLPD); Sabine Kropf (dieBasis); Simon Grimm (PDV); Anna Rasputina (Volt); Alexander Grevel (Klimaliste)
282	Lörrach – Müllheim	Diana Stöcker	Takis Mehmet Ali	Gerhard Zickenheiner	Martina Kempf	Christoph Hoffmann	Moritz Kenk	Alexander Riesener (PARTEI); Ulrich Kissel (FW); Sabine Schumacher (Piraten); Zeki Ates (MLPD); Juliane Prentice (dieBasis); Severine Vollmer (LKR); Lea Stocker (V-Partei3)
283	Emmendingen – Lahr	Yannick Bury	Johannes Fechner	Heike Dorow	Thomas Seitz	Tino Ritter	Imke Pirch	Jürgen Durke (Tierschutz); Dirk Ruppenthal (PARTEI); Matthias Stulz (FW); Michael Kefer (ÖDP); Ralph Herschlein (dieBasis); Milena Schiller-Ninô (Volt)
284	Offenburg	Wolfgang Schäuble	Matthias Katsch	Thomas Zawalski	Taras Maygutiak	Martin Gaßner-Herz	Simon Bärmann	Cornelius Lötsch (PARTEI); Adolf Huber (FW); Peter Cleiß (dieBasis)
285	Rottweil – Tuttlingen	Maria-Lena Weiss	Mirko Witkowski	Annette Reif	Joachim Bloch	Andreas Anton	Aynur Karlikli	Carmen Spiegelhalder-Schäfer (FW); Tobias Raffelt (ÖDP); Andreas Moritz (dieBasis); Mario Caraggiu (PDV)
286	Schwarzwald-Baar	Thorsten Frei	Derya Türk-Nachbaur	Thomas Bleile	Martin Rothweiler	Marcel Klinge	Heinrich Hermann	Marius Maier (FW); Helmut Kruse-Günter (MLPD); Marie-Therese Herrmann (dieBasis)
287	Konstanz	Andreas Jung	Lina Seitzl	Sebastian Lederer	Michael Hug	Ann-Veruschka Jurisch	Sibylle Röth	Björn Langer (PARTEI); Gordon Nothig (FW); Franz Weber (ÖDP); Michael Streitberger (LKR); Matthias Harting (Ind.); Helmut Ringger (Ind.)
288	Waldshut	Felix Schreiner	Rita Schwarzelühr-Sutter	Jan-Lukas Schmitt	Andrea Zürcher	Jareem Khawaja	Robert Kuhlmann	Dominik Brox (FW); Kilian Kronimus (ÖDP); Ursula Halfmann (dieBasis); Domenic Gehrmann (Volt)
289	Reutlingen	Michael Donth	Ulrich Bausch	Beate Müller-Gemmeke	Hansjörg Schrade	Pascal Kober	Jessica Tatti	Andreas Schwarz (PARTEI); Eberhard Sigloch (FW); Elke Weidner (MLPD); Sofia El Mestary (dieBasis)
290	Tübingen	Annette Widmann-Mauz	Martin Rosemann	Christian Kühn	Ingo Reetzke	Julian Grünke	Heike Hänsel	Oliver Mohr (Tierschutz); Christiane Lawrenz (PARTEI); Andreas Weber (FW); Kornelius Schultka (ÖDP); Stefan Klepp (DiB); Claudia Lenger-Atan (MLPD); Johanna Pardo (dieBasis)
291	Ulm	Ronja Kemmer	Jan Rothenbacher	Marcel Emmerich	Kristoff Heitmann	Alexander Kulitz	David Rizzotto	Miriam Broux (Tierschutz); Paul Eberhardt (PARTEI); Oliver Lang (FW); Anja Hirschel (Piraten); Gülay Öztoprak (MLPD); Andreas Steinau (PDV); Daniel Wagner (Klimaliste)
292	Biberach	Josef Rief	Martin Gerster	Anja Reinalter	Rebecca Weißbrodt	Florian Hirt	Rainer Schaaf	Simone Bischoff (Tierschutz); Sven Milverstaedt (PARTEI); Ulrich Bossler (FW); Samuel Schmid (Piraten); Norbert Huchler (ÖDP); Jan-Christopher Zubel (dieBasis)
293	Bodensee	Volker Mayer-Lay	Leon Hahn	Maria Heubuch	Alice Weidel	Christian Steffen-Stiehl	Sander Frank	Dominik Steuer (PARTEI); Thomas Brillisauer (FW); Annedore Schmid (ÖDP); Franziska Schmidt (MLPD); Johanna Findeisen-Juskowiak (dieBasis)
294	Ravensburg	Axel Müller	Heike Engelhardt	Agnieszka Brugger	Christoph Högel	Benjamin Strasser	Jasmin Runge	Lukas Rein (PARTEI); Günter Ruchti (FW); Siegfried Scharpf (ÖDP); Karl-Heinz Pauli (MLPD); Julian Aicher (dieBasis); Sona Pietsch (Mensch)
295	Zollernalb – Sigmaringen	Thomas Bareiß	Robin Mesarosch	Johannes Kretschmann	Nicolas Gregg	Stephan Link	Marco Hausner	Dominik Ochs (PARTEI); Jürgen Schiller (FW); Christine Koch-Kuhring (ÖDP); Renate Schmidt (MLPD); Volker Beil (dieBasis)

CDU list
#	Candidate	Constituency
1	Wolfgang Schäuble	Offenburg
2	Annette Widmann-Mauz	Tübingen
3	Andreas Jung	Konstanz
4	Steffen Bilger	Ludwigsburg
5	Ingeborg Gräßle	Backnang – Schwäbisch Gmünd
6	Alexander Föhr	Heidelberg
7	Stefan Kaufmann	Stuttgart I
8	Ingo Wellenreuther	Karlsruhe-Stadt
9	Johannes Rothenberger	
10	Christian Natterer	
11	Monica Wüllner	
12	Margaret Horb	
13	Alexander Throm	Heilbronn
14	Roman Baumgartner	
15	Ronja Kemmer	Ulm
16	Sarah Schmid	
17	Annette Dietl-Faude	
18	Carmen Jäger	
19	Dominik Schloßstein	
20	Melissa Schneider	
21	Lilly Hummel	
22	Helena Kapp	
23	Dominik Apel	
24	Luisa Koch	
25	Rainer Staib	
26	Maximilian Klingele	
27	Marie-Sophie Lanig	
28	Felix Ockenfuß	
29	Carsten Mohrhardt	
30	Kristoffer Werner	
31	Julia Alt	
32	Alessandro Pagella	
33	Marcel Kammerer	
34	Brigitte Schick	
35	Christiane Haase	
36	Norbert Strohmaier	
37	Valérie Neumann	
38	Vera Huber	
39	Annette Groschupp	
40	Roland Hörner	Mannheim
41	Alice Dorison	
42	Miriam Kammerer	
43	Matthias Heindl	
44	Ekaterina Hartung	
45	Heike Bruch	
46	Barbara Wild	
47	Ann-Cathrin Müller	
48	Tobias Walter	
49	Robert Märsch	
50	Susanne Weiher	
51	Wolfgang Falk	
52	Alexandra Sauter	
53	Florian Nußbaumer	
54	Tom-Lukas Lambrecht	
55	Daniel Kößler	
56	Elvira Große	
57	Iulia Reznitcaia	
58	Axel Häberle	
59	Ingrid Bauer	
60	Hanns Zalder	

SPD list
#	Candidate	Constituency
1	Saskia Esken	Calw
2	Nils Schmid	Nürtingen
3	Rita Schwarzelühr-Sutter	Waldshut
4	Martin Rosemann	Tübingen
5	Katja Mast	Pforzheim
6	Johannes Fechner	Emmendingen – Lahr
7	Leni Breymaier	Aalen – Heidenheim
8	Martin Gerster	Biberach
9	Jasmina Hostert	Böblingen
10	Lars Castellucci	Rhein-Neckar
11	Gabriele Katzmarek	Rastatt
12	Parsa Marvi	Karlsruhe-Stadt
13	Heike Baehrens	Göppingen
14	Macit Karaahmetoǧlu	Ludwigsburg
15	Lina Seitzl	Konstanz
16	Robin Mesarosch	Zollernalb – Sigmaringen
17	Isabel Cademartori	Mannheim
18	Josip Juratovic	Heilbronn
19	Derya Türk-Nachbaur	Schwarzwald-Baar
20	Kevin Leiser	Schwäbisch Hall – Hohenlohe
21	Heike Engelhardt	Ravensburg
22	Takis Mehmet Ali	Lörrach – Müllheim
23	Lucia Schanbacher	Stuttgart I
24	Leon Hahn	Bodensee
25	Nezaket Yildirim	Bruchsal – Schwetzingen
26	Thomas Utz	Neckar-Zaber
27	Elisabeth Krämer	Heidelberg
28	Mirko Witkowski	Rottweil – Tuttlingen
29	Anja Lotz	Odenwald – Tauber
30	Dejan Perc	Stuttgart II
31	Argyri Paraschaki	Esslingen
32	Matthias Katsch	Offenburg
33	Julia Söhne	Freiburg
34	Patrick Diebold	Karlsruhe-Land
35	Ulrich Bausch	Reutlingen
36	Tim-Luka Schwab	Backnang – Schwäbisch Gmünd

Green list
#	Candidate	Constituency
1	Franziska Brantner	Heidelberg
2	Cem Özdemir	Stuttgart I
3	Agnieszka Brugger	Ravensburg
4	Christian Kühn	Tübingen
5	Sandra Detzer	Ludwigsburg
6	Beate Müller-Gemmeke	Reutlingen
7	Harald Ebner	Schwäbisch Hall – Hohenlohe
8	Anna Christmann	Stuttgart II
9	Matthias Gastel	Nürtingen
10	Ricarda Lang	Backnang – Schwäbisch Gmünd
11	Marcel Emmerich	Ulm
12	Zoe Mayer	Karlsruhe-Stadt
13	Tobias Bacherle	Böblingen
14	Chantal Kopf	Freiburg
15	Stephanie Aeffner	Pforzheim
16	Melis Sekmen	Mannheim
17	Sebastian Schäfer	Esslingen
18	Anja Reinalter	Biberach
19	Jürgen Kretz	Rhein-Neckar
20	Margit Stumpp	Aalen – Heidenheim
21	Johannes Kretschmann	Zollernalb – Sigmaringen
22	Viktoria Kruse	Göppingen
23	Gerhard Zickenheiner	Lörrach – Müllheim
24	Charlotte Schneidewind-Hartnagel	Odenwald – Tauber
25	Thomas Zawalski	Offenburg
26	Annedore Kowatsch	Waiblingen
27	Thomas Bleile	Schwarzwald-Baar
28	Maria Heubach	Bodensee
29	Sebastian Lederer	Konstanz
30	Isabell Steidel	Heilbronn
31	Jan-Lukas Schmitt	Waldshut
32	Sara Haug	Calw
33	Lars Schweizer	Neckar-Zaber
34	Annette Reif	Rottweil – Tuttlingen
35	Patrick Haermeyer	
36	Amelie Pfeiffer	
37	Thomas Gönner	Rastatt
38	Heike Dorow	Emmendingen – Lahr
39	Alexander Link	
40	Jamsin Ateia	
41	Sebastian Grässer	Karlsruhe-Land
42	Gülay Kücük	
43	Baran Topal	
44	Sarah Heim	
45	Julia Link	
46	Sybille Klenzendorf	
47	Björn Bohnenkamp	
48	Ina Schultz	
49	Tizio Pfänder	
50	Amal Labbouz	
51	Lukas Weber	
52	Naomie Hübler	
53	Julian Dietzschold	
54	Clara Wellhäußer	
55	Markus Schmidt	
56	Susanne Häcker	
57	Ulrich Drescher	
58	Birgit Gerhard-Hentschel	
59	Henry Krüger	

AfD list
#	Candidate	Constituency
1	Alice Weidel	Bodensee
2	Martin Hess	Ludwigsburg
3	Dirk Spaniel	Stuttgart I
4	Markus Frohnmaier	Böblingen
5	Marc Jongen	Neckar-Zaber
6	Marc Bernhard	Karlsruhe-Stadt
7	Malte Kaufmann	Heidelberg
8	Christina Baum	Odenwald – Tauber
9	Thomas Seitz	Emmendingen – Lahr
10	Jürgen Braun	Waiblingen
11	Volker Münz	Göppingen
12	Rebecca Weißbrodt	Biberach

FDP list
#	Candidate	Constituency
1	Michael Theurer	Karlsruhe-Stadt
2	Judith Skudelny	Stuttgart I
3	Michael Georg Link	Heilbronn
4	Pascal Kober	Reutlingen
5	Florian Toncar	Böblingen
6	Benjamin Strasser	Ravensburg
7	Renata Alt	Nürtingen
8	Jens Brandenburg	Rhein-Neckar
9	Christoph Hoffmann	Lörrach – Müllheim
10	Christian Jung	
11	Stephan Seiter	Waiblingen
12	Valentin Abel	Schwäbisch Hall – Hohenlohe
13	Konrad Stockmeier	Mannheim
14	Ann-Veruschka Jurisch	Konstanz
15	Rainer Semet	Pforzheim
16	Martin Gaßner-Herz	Offenburg
17	Claudia Raffelhüschen	Freiburg
18	Julian Grünke	Tübingen
19	Michael König	Calw
20	Jan Olsson	Göppingen
21	Timur Lutfullin	Stuttgart II
22	Dennis Nusser	Heidelberg
23	Shristian Steffen-Stiehl	Bodensee
24	Marcel Distl	Neckar-Zaber
25	Arian Kriesch	Aalen – Heidenheim
26	Alexander Kulitz	Ulm
27	Timo Breuninger	Odenwald – Tauber
28	Sven Gehrke	Rastatt
29	Florian Hirt	Biberach
30	Oliver Martin	Ludwigsburg
31	Stephan Link	Zollernalb – Sigmaringen
32	David-Sebastian Hamm	Backnang – Schwäbisch Gmünd
33	Andreas Anton	Rottweil – Tuttlingen
34	Chris Brocke	
35	Tino Ritter	Emmendingen – Lahr
36	Jareem Khawaja	Waldshut

Left list
#	Candidate	Constituency
1	Bernd Riexinger	Stuttgart I
2	Gökay Akbulut	Mannheim
3	Jessica Tatti	Reutlingen
4	Michel Brandt	Karlsruhe-Stadt
5	Heike Hänsel	Tübingen
6	Tobias Pflüger	Freiburg
7	Zara Kızıltaş	Heidelberg
8	Ecevit Emre	Rhein-Neckar
9	Imke Pirch	Emmendingen – Lahr
10	Luigi Pantisano	Waiblingen
11	Jasmin Runge	Ravensburg
12	Sander Frank	Bodensee
13	Johanna Tiarks	Stuttgart II
14	Hüseyin Sahin	Nürtingen
15	Meltem Çelik	Pforzheim
16	Anil Beşli	Esslingen
17	Emma Weber	Neckar-Zaber
18	Jörg Rupp	Karlsruhe-Land
19	Sibylle Röth	Konstanz
20	Tim Steckbauer	Aalen – Heidenheim

=== Saarland ===
#	Constituency	CDU/CSU	SPD	GRÜNE	AfD	FDP	LINKE	Other
296	Saarbrücken	Annegret Kramp-Karrenbauer	Josephine Ortleb	Gerhard Wenz	Boris Huebner	Helmut Isringhaus	Mark Baumeister	Lukas Matheis (PARTEI); Hans Pflug (FW); Rolf Tickert (MLPD); Steffi Richter (dieBasis); Nico Herrmann (ÖDP); Stephan Poss (Ind.)
297	Saarlouis	Peter Altmaier	Heiko Maas	Ute Lessel	Carsten Becker	Angelika Hießerich-Peter	Dagmar Ensch-Engel	Sam Schröder (PARTEI); Klaus Hoffmann (FW); Marc Ensch (dieBasis); Philipp-Noah Groß (ÖDP)
298	St. Wendel	Nadine Schön	Christian Petry	Uta Sullenberger	Axel Magar	Oliver Luksic	Rosa Maria Grewenig	Denis Schröder (PARTEI); Clemens Werle (FW); Hans-Theo Both (dieBasis); Andrea Honecker (ÖDP)
299	Homburg	Markus Uhl	Esra-Leon Limbacher	Maria Luise Herber	Christian Wirth	Ralf Armbrüster	Florian Spaniol	Evelyne Görlinger (PARTEI); Axel Kammerer (FW); Ute Weisang (dieBasis); Claus Jacob (ÖDP)

CDU list
#	Candidate	Constituency
1	Annegret Kramp-Karrenbauer	Saarbrücken
2	Peter Altmaier	Saarlouis
3	Nadine Schön	St. Wendel
4	Markus Uhl	Homburg
5	Philipp Hoffmann	
6	Julia Albert	
7	Sirin Özfirat	
8	Markus Groß	
9	Ralph Schmidt	
10	Sandra Brühl	
11	Markus Franz	
12	Sandra Derschang-Sailer	
13	Jonas Reiter	
14	Alberina Karaxha	
15	Larissa Klein-Kallenborn	
16	Judith Jung	
17	Eva Bastian	
18	Susanne Tornes	
19	Alina Körner	
20	Fabian Laßotta	

SPD list
#	Candidate	Constituency
1	Heiko Maas	Saarlouis
2	Josephine Ortleb	Saarbrücken
3	Christian Petry	St. Wendel
4	Emily Vontz	
5	Esra-Leon Limbacher	Homburg
6	Fabienne Eli	
7	Bernhard Dick	
8	Katharine Trauden	
9	Patrick Müller	
10	Michaela Müller	
11	Janusz Ehrlich	
12	Anja Gelzleichter	
13	Michael Fixemer	
14	Rosemarie Moog	
15	Jan Stähly	

AfD list
#	Candidate	Constituency
1	Christian Wirth	Homburg
2	Carsten Becker	Saarlouis
3	Vanessa Haas	
4	Werner Schwaben	
5	Eduard Kockelmann	

FDP list
#	Candidate	Constituency
1	Oliver Luksic	St. Wendel
2	Helmut Isringhaus	Saarbrücken
3	Angelika Hießerich-Peter	Saarlouis
4	Dennis Ditz	
5	Benjamin Rausch	
6	Danny Meyer	
7	Jeannine Bonaventura	
8	Vera Haböck	
9	Sabine Reiter	
10	Heike Müller	

Left list
#	Candidate	Constituency
1	Thomas Lutze	
2	Andrea Neumann	
3	Dagmar Ensch-Engel	Saarlouis
4	Michael Bleines	
5	Thomas Jenal	
6	Herbert Jacob	

== Retiring deputies ==
=== CDU/CSU ===
- Norbert Barthle
- Manfred Behrens
- Sybille Benning
- Peter Bleser
- Norbert Brackmann
- Maria Flachsbarth
- Hans-Joachim Fuchtel
- Alois Gerig
- Eberhard Gienger
- Astrid Grotelüschen
- Mark Hauptmann
- Matthias Heider
- Heribert Hirte
- Karl Holmeier
- Alois Karl
- Volker Kauder, former CDU/CSU parliamentary leader
- Andreas Lämmel
- Karl A. Lamers
- Katharina Landgraf
- Nikolas Löbel
- Thomas de Maizière, former Minister of the Interior
- Hans-Georg von der Marwitz
- Angela Merkel, incumbent Chancellor
- Hans Michelbach
- Elisabeth Motschmann
- Gerd Müller, incumbent Minister of Economic Cooperation and Development
- Michaela Noll
- Georg Nüßlein
- Martin Patzelt
- Joachim Pfeiffer
- Eckhardt Rehberg
- Lothar Riebsamen
- Anita Schäfer
- Klaus-Peter Schulze
- Uwe Schummer
- Patrick Sensburg
- Frank Steffel
- Karin Strenz
- Peter Tauber
- Arnold Vaatz
- Kees de Vries
- Peter Weiß
- Marian Wendt
- Tobias Zech

=== SPD ===
- Bela Bach
- Lothar Binding
- Ingrid Arndt-Brauer
- Fritz Felgentreu
- Ulrich Freese
- Dagmar Freitag
- Barbara Hendricks, former minister of Federal Ministry of the Environment, Nature Conservation and Nuclear Safety
- Marcus Held
- Gustav Herzog
- Thomas Jurk
- Arno Klare
- Daniela Kolbe
- Ralf Kapschack
- Christine Lambrecht, incumbent Minister for Justice and Consumer Protection
- Christian Lange
- Kirsten Lühmann
- Caren Marks
- Christoph Matschie
- Hilde Mattheis
- Markus Paschke
- Florian Pronold
- Sascha Raabe
- Ernst Dieter Rossmann
- Ulla Schmidt, former minister of Federal Ministry of Health
- Ursula Schulte
- Martin Schulz, SPD candidate for Chancellor in the 2017 federal election
- Swen Schulz
- Rainer Spiering
- Sonja Steffen
- Kerstin Tack
- Gabi Weber
- Dagmar Ziegler, incumbent Vice President of the Bundestag

=== AfD ===
- Axel Gehrke
- Wilhelm von Gottberg
- Heiko Heßenkemper
- Lothar Maier
- Roman Reusch
- Heiko Wildberg

=== FDP ===
- Grigorios Aggelidis
- Britta Dassler
- Hartmut Ebbing
- Ulla Ihnen
- Marcel Klinge
- Alexander Kulitz
- Roman Müller-Böhm
- Martin Neumann
- Wieland Schinnenburg
- Frank Sitta
- Hermann Otto Solms, Father of the House
- Katja Suding

=== The Left ===
- Heidrun Bluhm-Förster
- Sylvia Gabelmann
- Fabio De Masi
- Ulla Jelpke
- Sabine Leidig
- Stefan Liebich
- Michael Leutert
- Niema Movassat
- Kirsten Tackmann
- Andreas Wagner
- Hubertus Zdebel

=== Greens ===
- Anja Hajduk
- Sylvia Kotting-Uhl
- Monika Lazar
- Friedrich Ostendorff
- Frithjof Schmidt

=== Independents ===
- Frauke Petry, former leader of AfD

== Sources ==
- "Schleswig-Holstein – Lists for individual Länder of parties". Federal Returning Officer.
- "Mecklenburg-Vorpommern – Lists for individual Länder of parties". Federal Returning Officer.
- "Hamburg – Lists for individual Länder of parties". Federal Returning Officer.
- "Niedersachsen – Lists for individual Länder of parties". Federal Returning Officer.
- "Bremen – Lists for individual Länder of parties". Federal Returning Officer.
- "Brandenburg – Lists for individual Länder of parties". Federal Returning Officer.
- "Sachsen-Anhalt – Lists for individual Länder of parties". Federal Returning Officer.
- "Berlin – Lists for individual Länder of parties". Federal Returning Officer.
- "Nordrhein-Westfalen – Lists for individual Länder of parties". Federal Returning Officer.
- "Sachsen – Lists for individual Länder of parties". Federal Returning Officer.
- "Hessen – Lists for individual Länder of parties". Federal Returning Officer.
- "Thüringen – Lists for individual Länder of parties". Federal Returning Officer.
- "Rheinland-Pfalz – Lists for individual Länder of parties". Federal Returning Officer.
- "Bayern – Lists for individual Länder of parties". Federal Returning Officer.
- "Baden-Württemberg – Lists for individual Länder of parties". Federal Returning Officer.
- "Saarland – Lists for individual Länder of parties". Federal Returning Officer.
