= Lippe I =

Federal electoral district of Germany

134 Lippe I
- Electoral district for the Bundestag
- Lippe I in 2025
- State: North Rhine-Westphalia
- Population: 293,200 (2019)
- Electorate: 224,415 (2017)
- Major settlements: Detmold; Bad Salzuflen; Lemgo
- Area: 889.2 km^{2}

Current electoral district
- Created: 1980
- Party: CDU
- Member: Kerstin Vieregge
- Elected: 2025

Lippe I is an electoral constituency (German: Wahlkreis) represented in the Bundestag. It elects one member via first-past-the-post voting. Under the current constituency numbering system, it is designated as constituency 134. It is located in eastern North Rhine-Westphalia, comprising the northern part of the Lippe district.

Lippe I was created for the 1980 federal election. From 2021 to 2025, it has been represented by Jürgen Berghahn of the Social Democratic Party (SPD). Since 2025 it has been represented by Kerstin Vieregge of the CDU.

== Geography ==
Lippe I is located in eastern North Rhine-Westphalia. As of the 2021 federal election, it comprises the entirety of the Lippe district excluding the municipalities of Augustdorf, Horn-Bad Meinberg, Lügde, Schieder-Schwalenberg, and Schlangen.

== History ==
Lippe I was created in 1980 and contained parts of the abolished constituency of Detmold – Lippe. In the 1980 through 1998 elections, it was constituency 105 in the numbering system. From 2002 through 2009, it was number 136. In the 2013 through 2021 elections, it was number 135. From the 2025 election, it has been number 134. In the 2021 election, the constituency acquired the municipality of Detmold.

Election	No.	Name	Borders
1980	105	Lippe I	Lippe district (excluding Augustdorf, Detmold, Horn-Bad Meinberg, Lügde, Schieder-Schwalenberg, and Schlangen municipalities)
1983	105	Lippe I	Lippe district (excluding Augustdorf, Detmold, Horn-Bad Meinberg, Lügde, Schieder-Schwalenberg, and Schlangen municipalities)
1987	105	Lippe I	Lippe district (excluding Augustdorf, Detmold, Horn-Bad Meinberg, Lügde, Schieder-Schwalenberg, and Schlangen municipalities)
1990	105	Lippe I	Lippe district (excluding Augustdorf, Detmold, Horn-Bad Meinberg, Lügde, Schieder-Schwalenberg, and Schlangen municipalities)
1994	105	Lippe I	Lippe district (excluding Augustdorf, Detmold, Horn-Bad Meinberg, Lügde, Schieder-Schwalenberg, and Schlangen municipalities)
1998	105	Lippe I	Lippe district (excluding Augustdorf, Detmold, Horn-Bad Meinberg, Lügde, Schieder-Schwalenberg, and Schlangen municipalities)
2002	136	Lippe I	Lippe district (excluding Augustdorf, Detmold, Horn-Bad Meinberg, Lügde, Schieder-Schwalenberg, and Schlangen municipalities)
2005	136	Lippe I	Lippe district (excluding Augustdorf, Detmold, Horn-Bad Meinberg, Lügde, Schieder-Schwalenberg, and Schlangen municipalities)
2009	136	Lippe I	Lippe district (excluding Augustdorf, Detmold, Horn-Bad Meinberg, Lügde, Schieder-Schwalenberg, and Schlangen municipalities)
2013	135	Lippe I	Lippe district (excluding Augustdorf, Detmold, Horn-Bad Meinberg, Lügde, Schieder-Schwalenberg, and Schlangen municipalities)
2017	135	Lippe I	Lippe district (excluding Augustdorf, Detmold, Horn-Bad Meinberg, Lügde, Schieder-Schwalenberg, and Schlangen municipalities)
2021	135	Lippe I	Lippe district (excluding Augustdorf, Horn-Bad Meinberg, Lügde, Schieder-Schwalenberg, and Schlangen municipalities)
2025	134	Lippe I	Lippe district (excluding Augustdorf, Horn-Bad Meinberg, Lügde, Schieder-Schwalenberg, and Schlangen municipalities)

== Members ==
The constituency was first represented by Erhard Mahne of the Social Democratic Party (SPD) from 1980 to 1983, when it was won by Klaus Daweke of the CDU for a single term. Karl Hermann Haack of the SPD was elected in 1987 and served until 2005. Fellow party member Dirk Becker was then representative for three terms. Kerstin Vieregge of the CDU was elected in 2017. Jürgen Berghahn regained the constituency for the SPD in 2021. In 2025 Kerstin Vieregge regained her old seat.

Election	Member	Party	%
1980	Erhard Mahne	SPD	49.8
1983	Klaus Daweke	CDU	46.3
1987	Karl Hermann Haack	SPD	45.0
1990	Karl Hermann Haack	SPD	47.7
1994	Karl Hermann Haack	SPD	46.7
1998	Karl Hermann Haack	SPD	52.2
2002	Karl Hermann Haack	SPD	49.5
2005	Dirk Becker	SPD	48.0
2009	Dirk Becker	SPD	40.2
2013	Dirk Becker	SPD	41.1
2017	Kerstin Vieregge	CDU	36.6
2021	Jürgen Berghahn	SPD	30.7
2025	Kerstin Vieregge	CDU	31.3

== Election results ==
=== 2025 election ===
Federal election (2025): Lippe I
Notes:	Blue background denotes the winner of the electorate vote. Pink background denotes a candidate elected from their party list. Yellow background denotes an electorate win by a list member, or other incumbent. A ✓ or ✗ denotes status of any incumbent, win or lose respectively.						
Party	Candidate	Votes	%	±%	Party votes	%	±%
CDU	Kerstin Vieregge	56,640	31.3	▲5.1	49,204	27.1	▲4.3
SPD	Julien Thiede	42,552	23.5	▼7.2	37,926	20.9	▼10.2
AfD	Udo Hemmelgarn	39,427	21.8	▲12.3	39,517	21.8	▲12.0
Greens	Robin Wagener	21,911	12.1	▼3.7	19,245	10.6	▼3.0
Left	Eduard Schneider	10,896	6.0	▲2.9	12,324	6.8	▲3.0
BSW					8,069	4.4	
FDP	Torben Hundsdörfer	5,474	3.0	▼6.7	7,713	4.3	▼7.6
FW	Ralf Ochsenfahrt	3,857	2.1	▲0.9	1,440	0.8	0.0
Tierschutzpartei					2,255	1.2	▼0.1
PARTEI				▼1.8	1,059	0.6	▼0.5
Volt					825	0.5	▲0.3
dieBasis				▼1.7	575	0.3	▼1.2
PdF					324	0.2	▲0.1
Team Todenhöfer					312	0.2	▲0.1
BD					244	0.1	
Values					239	0.1	
MERA25					51	0.0	
MLPD					33	0.0	0.0
Bündnis C							▼0.7
Pirates							▼0.4
Gesundheitsforschung							▼0.1
ÖDP							▼0.1
Humanists							▼0.1
SGP						0.0	0.0
Informal votes		1,922			1,324		
Total valid votes		180,757			181,355		
Turnout		182,679	82.4	▲5.6			
CDU gain from SPD	Majority	14,088	7.8				

=== 2021 election ===
Federal election (2021): Lippe I
Notes:	Blue background denotes the winner of the electorate vote. Pink background denotes a candidate elected from their party list. Yellow background denotes an electorate win by a list member, or other incumbent. A ✓ or ✗ denotes status of any incumbent, win or lose respectively.						
Party	Candidate	Votes	%	±%	Party votes	%	±%
SPD	Jürgen Berghahn	52,359	30.7	▼1.2	53,130	31.1	▲3.5
CDU	✗ Kerstin Vieregge	44,650	26.2	▼9.9	39,001	22.8	▼8.4
Greens	Robin Wagener	26,932	15.8	▲9.1	23,276	13.6	▲6.2
FDP	Christian Sauter	16,648	9.8	▲1.6	20,221	11.8	▼0.5
AfD	Udo Hemmelgarn	16,221	9.5	▼0.4	16,789	9.8	▼1.0
Left	Walter Brinkmann	5,283	3.1	▼2.7	6,414	3.8	▼3.3
PARTEI	Niklas Hartmann	3,070	1.8		1,781	1.0	▲0.4
dieBasis	Enrico Haberkorn	2,936	1.7		2,559	1.5	
Tierschutzpartei					2,216	1.3	▲0.6
FW	Ralf Ochsenfahrt	2,171	1.3	0.0	1,348	0.8	▲0.1
Bündnis C					1,244	0.7	
Pirates					637	0.4	▼0.1
Team Todenhöfer					520	0.3	
Volt					289	0.2	
LIEBE					231	0.1	
Gesundheitsforschung					190	0.1	0.0
LfK					173	0.1	
NPD					170	0.1	▼0.1
ÖDP					154	0.1	0.0
Humanists					136	0.1	0.0
V-Partei3					96	0.1	0.0
du.					90	0.1	
LKR	Michael Haupt	235	0.1		85	0.0	
PdF					59	0.0	
MLPD					25	0.0	0.0
DKP					23	0.0	0.0
SGP					14	0.0	0.0
Informal votes		1,897			1,531		
Total valid votes		170,505			170,871		
Turnout		172,402	76.8	▲1.4			
SPD gain from CDU	Majority	7,709	4.5				

=== 2017 election ===
Federal election (2017): Lippe I
Notes:	Blue background denotes the winner of the electorate vote. Pink background denotes a candidate elected from their party list. Yellow background denotes an electorate win by a list member, or other incumbent. A ✓ or ✗ denotes status of any incumbent, win or lose respectively.						
Party	Candidate	Votes	%	±%	Party votes	%	±%
CDU	Kerstin Vieregge	46,526	36.6	▼3.6	40,214	31.5	▼7.7
SPD	Henning Welslau	40,908	32.1	▼9.0	35,509	27.8	▼7.3
AfD	Olaf Tünker	13,005	10.2	▲7.7	14,147	11.1	▲7.3
FDP	Christian Sauter	10,690	8.4	▲6.1	15,916	12.5	▲7.9
Greens	Ute Koczy	7,671	6.0	▲0.3	8,869	7.0	▼0.4
Left	Ursula Jacob-Reisinger	6,870	5.4	▲1.2	8,399	6.6	▲1.5
Tierschutzpartei					879	0.7	
FW	Monika Prüßner-Claus	1,607	1.3	▲0.6	871	0.7	0.0
PARTEI					784	0.6	▲0.3
Pirates					553	0.4	▼1.6
NPD					278	0.2	▼0.6
AD-DEMOKRATEN					185	0.1	
DM					182	0.1	
ÖDP					121	0.1	0.0
Volksabstimmung					121	0.1	▼0.1
BGE					117	0.1	
Gesundheitsforschung					100	0.1	
V-Partei³					95	0.1	
DiB					78	0.1	
Die Humanisten					56	0.0	
MLPD					37	0.0	0.0
DKP					19	0.0	
SGP					7	0.0	0.0
Informal votes		1,661			1,401		
Total valid votes		127,277			127,537		
Turnout		128,938	75.6	▲2.7			
CDU gain from SPD	Majority	5,618	4.5				

=== 2013 election ===
Federal election (2013): Lippe I
Notes:	Blue background denotes the winner of the electorate vote. Pink background denotes a candidate elected from their party list. Yellow background denotes an electorate win by a list member, or other incumbent. A ✓ or ✗ denotes status of any incumbent, win or lose respectively.						
Party	Candidate	Votes	%	±%	Party votes	%	±%
SPD	✓ Dirk Becker	50,934	41.1	▲0.9	43,583	35.1	▲0.5
CDU	Cajus Julius Caesar	49,783	40.2	▲3.3	48,776	39.3	▲7.2
Greens	Ute Koczy	7,070	5.7	▼1.0	9,123	7.3	▼0.8
Left	Berndt Wobig	5,186	4.2	▼2.6	6,369	5.1	▼2.0
FDP	Markus Schiek	2,873	2.3	▼7.1	5,698	4.6	▼8.6
Pirates	Jürgen van Schwamen	2,814	2.3		2,498	2.0	▲0.2
AfD	Michael Hentschel	3,154	2.5		4,758	3.8	
NPD					1,020	0.8	0.0
FW	Fabian Hagen Freitag	868	0.7		788	0.6	
Independent	Dittmar Teschke	664	0.5				
Independent	Alexander Gutsch	565	0.5				
PARTEI					379	0.3	
PRO					266	0.2	
Volksabstimmung					238	0.2	▲0.1
REP					139	0.1	▼0.2
ÖDP					133	0.1	0.0
Nichtwahler					105	0.1	
Party of Reason					95	0.1	
BIG					60	0.0	
RRP					56	0.0	▼0.1
PSG					36	0.0	0.0
Die Rechte					29	0.0	
MLPD					27	0.0	0.0
BüSo					18	0.0	0.0
Informal votes		1,797			1,514		
Total valid votes		123,911			124,194		
Turnout		125,708	72.9	▼0.3			
SPD hold	Majority	1,151	0.9	▼2.4			

=== 2009 election ===
Federal election (2009): Lippe I
Notes:	Blue background denotes the winner of the electorate vote. Pink background denotes a candidate elected from their party list. Yellow background denotes an electorate win by a list member, or other incumbent. A ✓ or ✗ denotes status of any incumbent, win or lose respectively.						
Party	Candidate	Votes	%	±%	Party votes	%	±%
SPD	✓ Dirk Becker	50,688	40.2	▼7.8	43,628	34.5	▼8.5
CDU	Cajus Julius Caesar	46,447	36.9	▼1.7	40,545	32.1	▼1.0
FDP	Gudrun Kopp	11,879	9.4	▲5.0	16,627	13.2	▲3.6
Left	Manfred Lurz	8,492	6.7	▲3.3	9,059	7.2	▲2.7
Greens	Ute Koczy	8,431	6.7	▲3.1	10,270	8.1	▲1.6
Pirates					2,283	1.8	
NPD					1,039	0.8	0.0
FAMILIE					779	0.6	▲0.2
Tierschutzpartei					728	0.6	▲0.2
RENTNER					397	0.3	
REP					358	0.3	0.0
RRP					139	0.1	
ÖDP					119	0.1	
Volksabstimmung					95	0.1	0.0
DVU					94	0.1	
Centre					66	0.1	0.0
BüSo					36	0.0	0.0
MLPD					23	0.0	0.0
PSG					10	0.0	0.0
Informal votes		1,880			1,522		
Total valid votes		125,937			126,295		
Turnout		127,817	73.2	▼7.0			
SPD hold	Majority	4,241	3.3	▼6.1			

=== 2005 election ===
Federal election (2005): Lippe I
Notes:	Blue background denotes the winner of the electorate vote. Pink background denotes a candidate elected from their party list. Yellow background denotes an electorate win by a list member, or other incumbent. A ✓ or ✗ denotes status of any incumbent, win or lose respectively.						
Party	Candidate	Votes	%	±%	Party votes	%	±%
SPD	Dirk Becker	66,665	48.0	▼1.5	59,814	43.1	▼2.8
CDU	Cajus Caesar	53,607	38.6	▲2.3	45,987	33.1	▼0.5
FDP	Gudrun Kopp	6,165	4.4	▼2.9	13,358	9.6	▲0.6
Greens	Jutta Dümpe-Krüger	4,990	3.6	▼0.48	9,016	6.5	▼0.48
Left	Frank Bartel	4,800	3.5	▲2.5	6,183	4.5	▲3.5
NPD	Rüdiger Kahsner	1,331	1.0		1,137	0.8	▲0.6
PBC	Stefan Mehrwald	1,318	0.9	▲0.2	1,339	1.0	▲0.2
Tierschutzpartei					577	0.4	▲0.1
Familie					536	0.4	▲0.2
REP					446	0.3	▼0.3
GRAUEN					279	0.2	▲0.1
From Now on... Democracy Through Referendum					134	0.1	
Socialist Equality Party					57	0.0	
BüSo					32	0.0	
Centre					41	0.0	
MLPD					22	0.0	
Informal votes		2,156			2,094		
Total valid votes		138,876			138,938		
Turnout		141,032	80.3	▼2.8			
SPD hold	Majority	13,058	9.4				
