= Glimke =

River in Germany

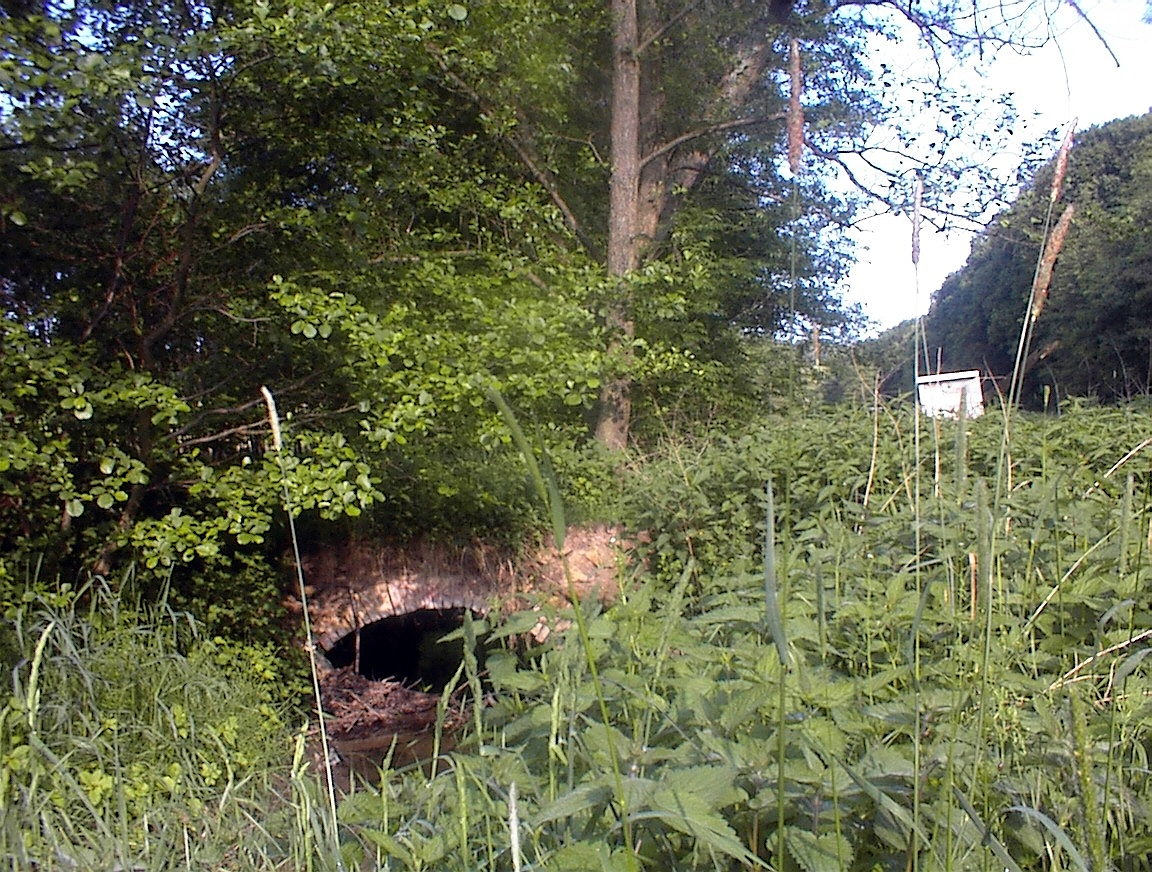

Location
- Country: Germany
- States: North Rhine-Westphalia

Physical characteristics
- Mouth
  - location: Salze
  - coordinates: 52.1242°N 8.7792°E

Basin features
- Progression: Salze→ Bega→ Werre→ Weser→ North Sea

Glimke is a small river of North Rhine-Westphalia, Germany. It is 6.2 km long and flows into the Salze near Bad Salzuflen.

== See also ==
- List of rivers of North Rhine-Westphalia
