= Christian Sauter =

Christian Sauter is the name of:

- Christian Sauter (footballer), German footballer
- Christian Sauter (politician), German politician
