= Jürgen Berghahn =

German politician (born 1960)

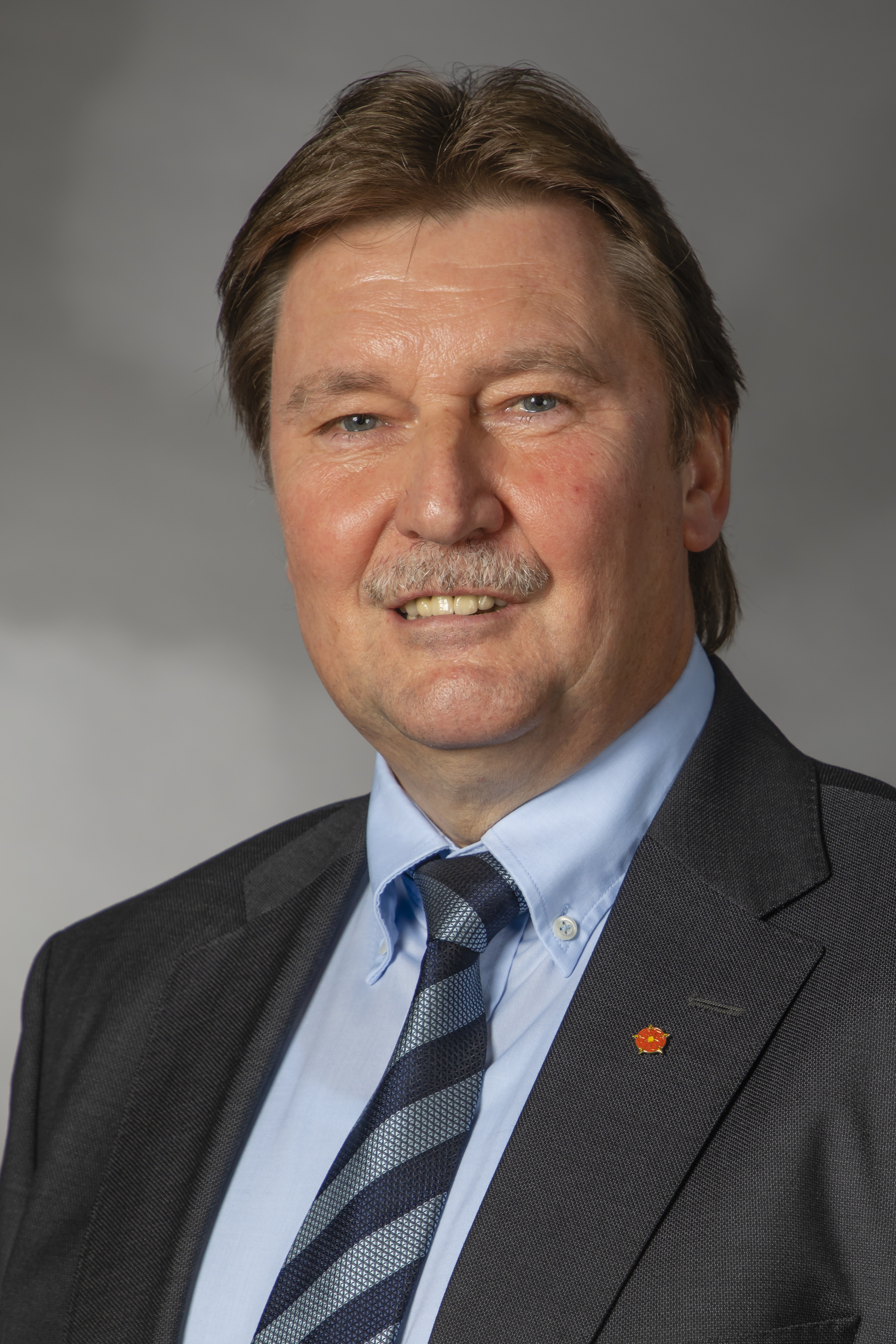

Member of the Bundestag
- In office 2021–2025

Personal details
- Born: 5 July 1960 (age 66) Blomberg, North Rhine-Westphalia, West Germany (now Germany)
- Party: SPD

Jürgen Berghahn (born 5 July 1960 in Blomberg) is a German politician of the Social Democratic Party (SPD) who has been serving as a member of the German Bundestag for Lippe I since the 2021 German federal election. Previously, he was a member of the North Rhine-Westphalia state parliament from 2010 to 2021.

== Early life and career ==
Berghahn did an apprenticeship as an electrician. He worked for Schieder Möbel for 26 years until the company's insolvency. He was a member of the company's works council from 1994 to 2008 and served as deputy chairman of the group workers council from 2002 until 2008. Berghahn is a lecturer in adult education for private and trade union educational institutions. He has been a member of IG Metall since 1984.

== Political career ==
Berghahn has been a member of the Blomberg town council and local chairman of Istrup since 2004. He has been the chairman of the Blomberg real estate and property management since 2004. He is chairman of the SPD local association Istrup/Wellentrup.

Berghahn was elected as a member of the State Parliament of North Rhine-Westphalia in the state parliamentary constituency of Lippe II in the state elections of 2010, 2012, and 2017.

=== Member of the German Parliament, 2021–present ===
Berghahn ran as an SPD direct candidate for the federal constituency Lippe I and won the direct mandate in the 2021 federal election. In the course of this, he resigned his state parliament mandate. Nina Andrieshen succeeded him in the state parliament.

In parliament, Berghahn has been serving on the Committee on Transport. Within his parliamentary group, he belongs to the Parliamentary Left, a left-wing movement.

In 2024, Berhahn announced that he isn't seeking re-election to the Bundestag in the 2025 German federal election.

== Personal life ==
Berghahn is married and the father of two children.

== See also ==
- List of members of the 20th Bundestag
