= Karl Hermann Haack =

Karl Hermann Haack (born 17 February 1940) is a German politician of the Social Democratic Party of Germany (SPD). Trained as a pharmacist, he was a member of the Bundestag from 1987 to 2005, representing the Lippe I constituency in North Rhine-Westphalia by direct mandate throughout. From 1998 to 2005 he was the German federal government's Commissioner for the Interests of People with Disabilities (Beauftragter der Bundesregierung für die Belange behinderter Menschen), and from 2005 to 2009 he was president of the German Disabled Sports Association (Deutscher Behindertensportverband, DBS).

== Early life ==
Haack was born in Extertal-Bösingfeld in the district of Lippe. He completed his Abitur in 1961 and did a pharmacy internship in Oerlinghausen before studying pharmacy at the Free University of Berlin from 1964, qualifying as a pharmacist in 1967. He went on to study history, political science and sociology in Berlin from 1967 to 1969, and afterwards worked until 1971 for the Bundesverband der Pharmazeutischen Industrie (Federal Association of the Pharmaceutical Industry) in Frankfurt am Main.

He joined the SPD in 1968. He is married and has two children.

== Political career ==
=== Local politics ===
Haack was a member of the district council (Kreistag) of the district of Lippe from 1973 to 1987, and of the Landschaftsverband Westfalen-Lippe from 1978 to 1987. He joined the municipal council of Extertal in 1975 and served as its mayor from 1979 to 1994.

=== Member of the Bundestag ===
Haack was elected to the Bundestag in 1987 and sat there until 2005, winning the direct mandate for the Lippe I constituency at each election; he took 52.2 percent of the first-vote ballots in 1998 and 49.5 percent in 2002. During his time in parliament he was a member of the SPD parliamentary group's executive committee and worked on health and social policy, including psychiatric care reform in eastern Westphalia.

=== Federal Commissioner for the Interests of People with Disabilities ===
From 1998 to 2005, Haack held the post of Commissioner of the Federal Government for the Interests of People with Disabilities under Chancellor Gerhard Schröder, succeeding Otto Regenspurger; he was in turn succeeded by Karin Evers-Meyer. During his tenure the Bundestag passed three laws on disability policy: a 2000 law aimed at reducing unemployment among people with severe disabilities, the Social Code Book IX on rehabilitation and participation of people with disabilities, which took effect on 1 July 2001, and the 2002 Equal Opportunities Act for People with Disabilities, which recognised German Sign Language and set out a right to a barrier-free environment. The European Year of People with Disabilities, held in 2003 under the slogan "Nothing about us without us" (Nicht über uns ohne uns), fell within his term as commissioner.

He received the German Society for Social Medicine and Prevention's Salomon Neumann Medal in 2003. The German Association of the Deaf (Deutscher Gehörlosen-Bund) gave him its Kulturpreis (culture prize) in 2003. On 17 November 2004 the Arbeitsgemeinschaft Deutscher Berufsförderungswerke (Working Group of German Vocational Training Centres) presented him with a further award for his work on disability policy.

=== President of the German Disabled Sports Association ===
Haack was president of the German Disabled Sports Association from 2005 to 2009. He did not stand again at the association's general assembly, held on 19–20 June 2009 in Cologne, where Friedhelm Julius Beucher was elected as his successor.

== Electoral history ==
Election	Constituency	Party	Constituency vote	Result
1998	Lippe I	SPD	52.2%	Elected
2002	Lippe I	SPD	49.5%	Elected

Political offices
Preceded by Otto Regenspurger	Federal Government Commissioner for the Interests of People with Disabilities; 1998–2005	Succeeded by Karin Evers-Meyer
Sporting positions
Preceded by	President of the German Disabled Sports Association; 2005–2009	Succeeded by Friedhelm Julius Beucher
