= Horst Steinmann =

German economist

- Born: July 17, 1934 (age 91); Bad Salzuflen, Lippe
- Known for: Economic study; professor of management economics and economic theory

Horst Steinmann (born 17 July 1934) is a German economist and professor emeritus of management economics and business administration at the University of Erlangen-Nuremberg.

His scholarly papers have been featured in the Social Science Research Network, and he has contributed to many books and journals, such as Working Across Cultures, the theme of the Ninth Annual Conference of the European Business Ethics Network, and Corporate Governance and Directors' Liabilities with his essay "The Enterprise as a Political System".

== Select works ==
- Corporate Ethics and Management Theory, co-written with Andreas Georg Scherer.
- Some Remarks on the Problem of Incommensurability in Organization Studies, co-written with Andreas Georg Scherer.
- Managing the Multinational Enterprise in a World of Different Cultures: Some Fundamental Remarks on the Pluralism of Cultures and its Managerial Consequences, co-written with Andreas Georg Scherer.
- Global Rules and Private Actors: Some Remarks on the Role of Corporate Ethics in the Process of Globalization.
