= Robin Wagener =

German politician (born 1980)

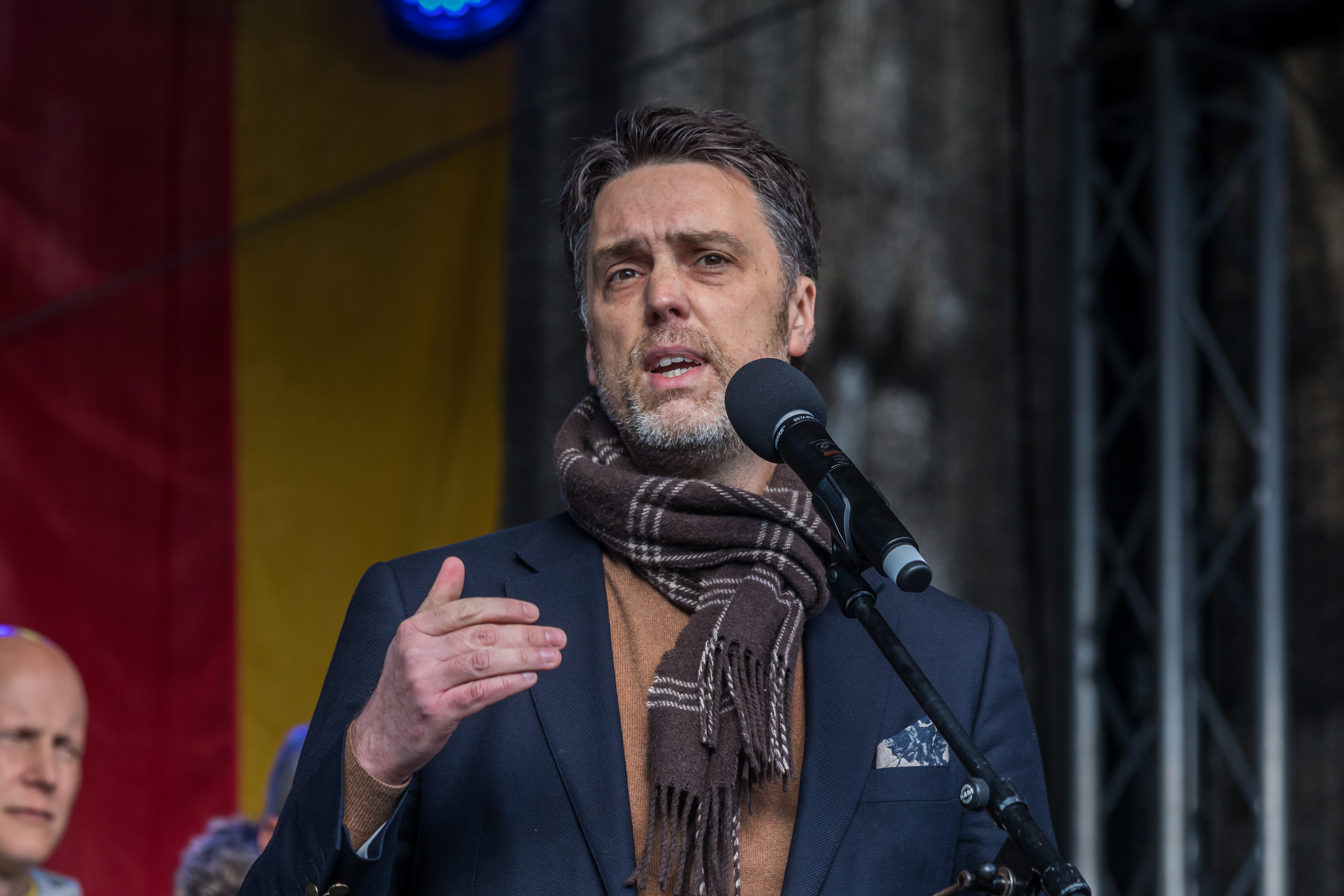
- Wagener in 2024

Member of the Bundestag
- Incumbent
- Assumed office 26 October 2021

Personal details
- Born: 16 August 1980 (age 46) Bielefeld, West Germany (now Germany)
- Party: Alliance 90/The Greens Alliance 90/The Greens
- Education: Bielefeld University
- Website: robin-wagener.de

Robin Till Nils Johannes Wagener (born 16 August 1980) is a German judge and politician of the Alliance 90/The Greens who has been a member of the Bundestag in the 2021 German federal election, representing the Lippe I district.

In addition to his parliamentary mandate, Wagener has been serving as the Coordinator for Intersocietal Cooperation with the Southern Caucasus, the Republic of Moldova and Central Asia at the Federal Foreign Office since 2023.

== Political career ==
In parliament, Wagener has been serving on the Committee on Foreign Affairs and the Committee on European Affairs. In this capacity, he is also his parliamentary group’s rapporteur on Russia and Ukraine.

In addition to his committee assignments, Wagener has been chairing the German delegation to the Parliamentary Assembly of the Organization for Security and Co-operation in Europe since 2022. He is also the chairman of the German-Ukrainian Parliamentary Friendship Group.

In the negotiations to form a coalition government of the Christian Democratic Union (CDU) and the Green Party under Minister-President of North Rhine-Westphalia Hendrik Wüst following the 2022 state elections, Wagener and Verena Schäffer led their party’s delegation in the working group on internal and legal affairs; their counterparts from the CDU were Herbert Reul and Peter Biesenbach.

== Other activities ==
- German Red Cross (DRK), Member

== Personal life ==
Wagener is married and has two children. The family lives in Bad Salzuflen.
