= Salze (Bega) =

River in Germany

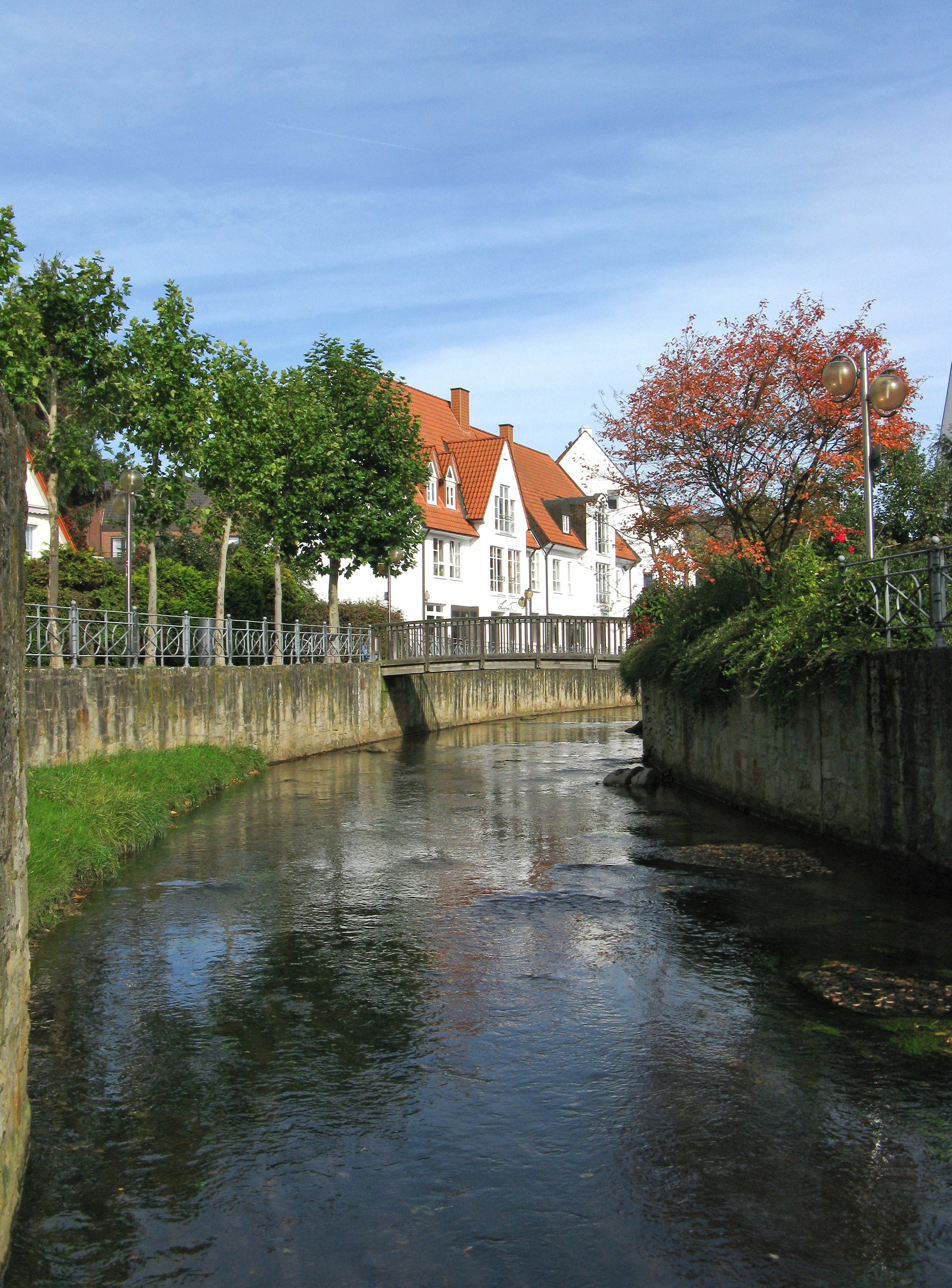

Location
- Country: Germany
- State: North Rhine-Westphalia

Physical characteristics
- Mouth
  - location: Bega
  - coordinates: 52.0799°N 8.7434°E
- Length: 14.8 km (9.2 mi)

Basin features
- Progression: Bega→ Werre→ Weser→ North Sea

Salze (German pronunciation: [ˈzaltsə]) is a river of North Rhine-Westphalia, Germany. It is a right tributary of the Bega in Bad Salzuflen.

== See also ==
- List of rivers of North Rhine-Westphalia
