= Nina Andrieshen =

German politician (born 1980)

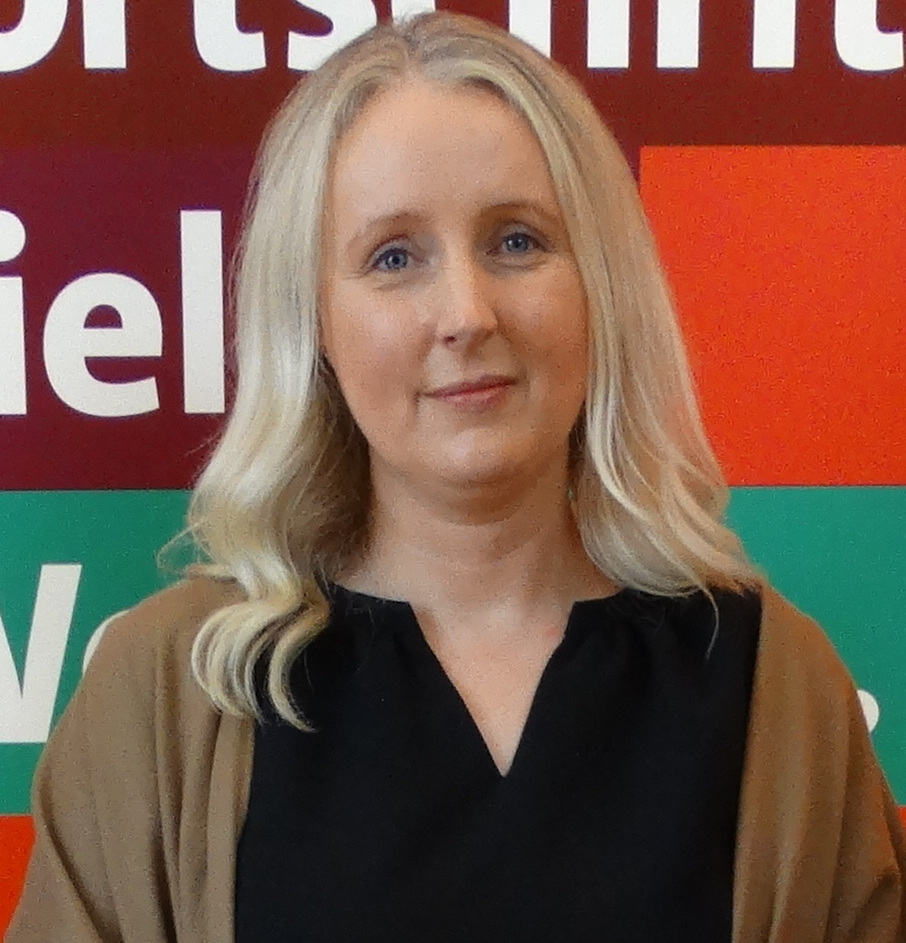
- Andrieshen in 2021

Member of the Landtag of North Rhine-Westphalia
- Incumbent
- Assumed office 2 November 2021
- Preceded by: Jürgen Berghahn

Personal details
- Born: 19 March 1980 (age 46)
- Party: Social Democratic Party (since 2011)

Nina Andrieshen (born 19 March 1980) is a German politician serving as a member of the Landtag of North Rhine-Westphalia since 2021. She has served as chairwoman of the Child Protection Committee since 2024.
