= Johann Schröder (physician) =

German physician (1600–1664)

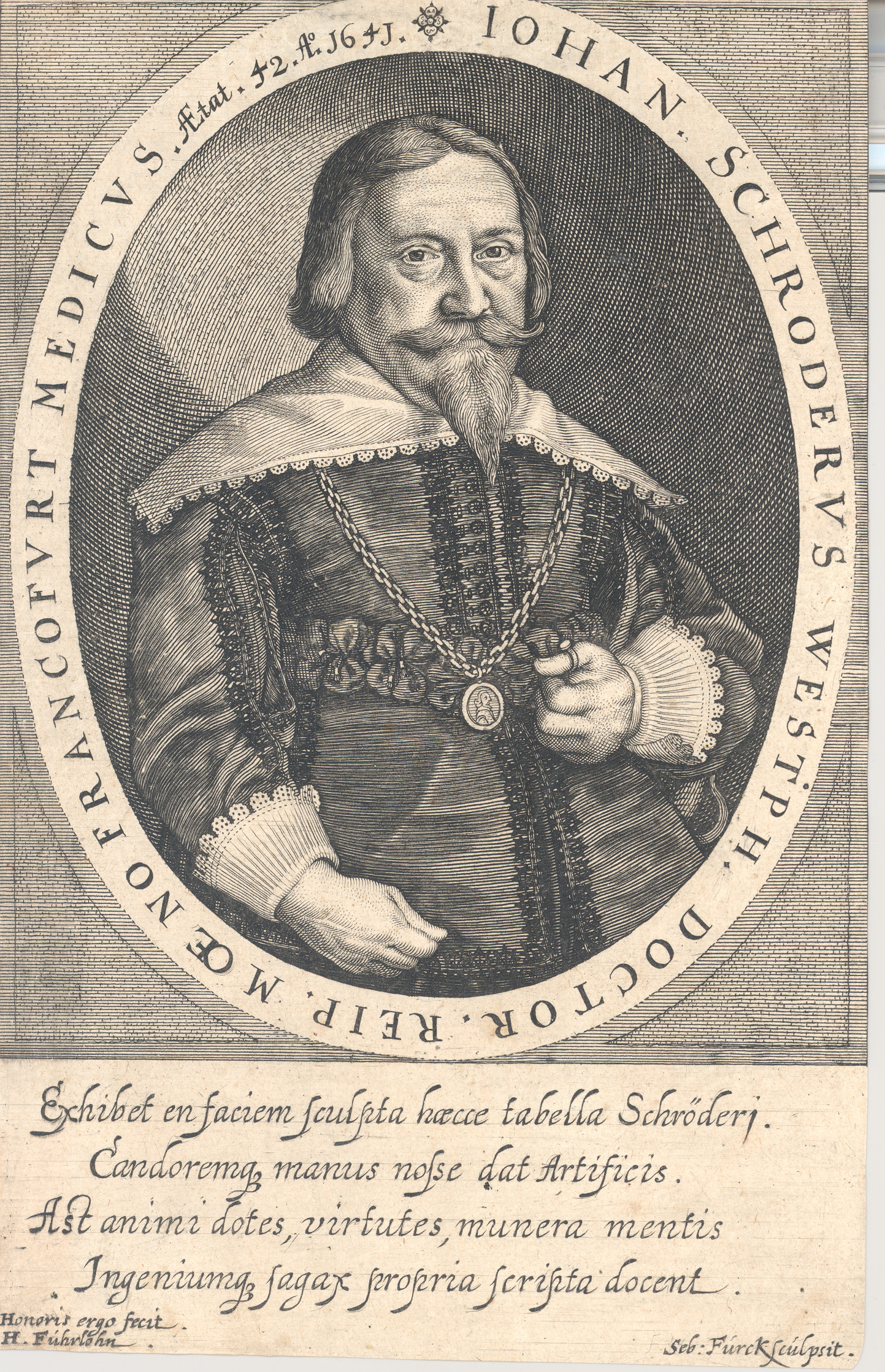
Schröder in a 1641 illustration

Johann Schröder (1600, Bad Salzuflen – 1664) was a German physician and pharmacologist who was the first person to recognise that arsenic was an element. In 1649, he produced the elemental form of arsenic by heating its oxide, and published two methods for its preparation.

== Works ==
- Pharmacopoeia medico-chymica sive thesaurus pharmacologicus : quo composita quaeque celebriora, hinc mineralia, vegetabilia & animalia chymico-medice describuntur, atque insuper principia physicae hermetico-hippocraticae candide exhibentur; opus, non minus utile physicis quam medicis . Gerlin, Ulm Ed. secunda correctum & auctum 1644 Digital edition / 1649 Digital edition / Opus, editione quarta, plurimis in locis auctum ac emendatum 1656 Digital edition / Editione ultima, plurimis in locis auctum, correctum ac emendatum 1665 Digital edition / Hac septima emendatum, omissis locupletatum, notisque auctum / a Joanne Ludovico Witzelio 1677 Digital edition by the University and State Library Düsseldorf
- La pharmacopée raisonnée de Schroder . Vol. 1&2 . Amaulry, Lyon 1698 Digital edition by the University and State Library Düsseldorf
- Vollständige und nutz-reiche Apotheke/ Oder: Trefflich versehener Medicin-Chymischer höchstkostbarer Artzney-Schatz : Nebst D. Friedrich Hoffmanns darüber verfasseten herrlichen Anmerckungen; in fünff Bücher eingetheilt ... . Hoffmann & Streck, Franckfurt [u.a.] Nun aber bey dieser Zweyten Edition Um ein merckliches vermehret und verbessert 1709 Digital edition / Nun aber bey dieser dritten Edition um ein merckliches vermehret, verbessert 1718 Digital edition by the University and State Library Düsseldorf
