= Bega (Werre) =

River in Germany

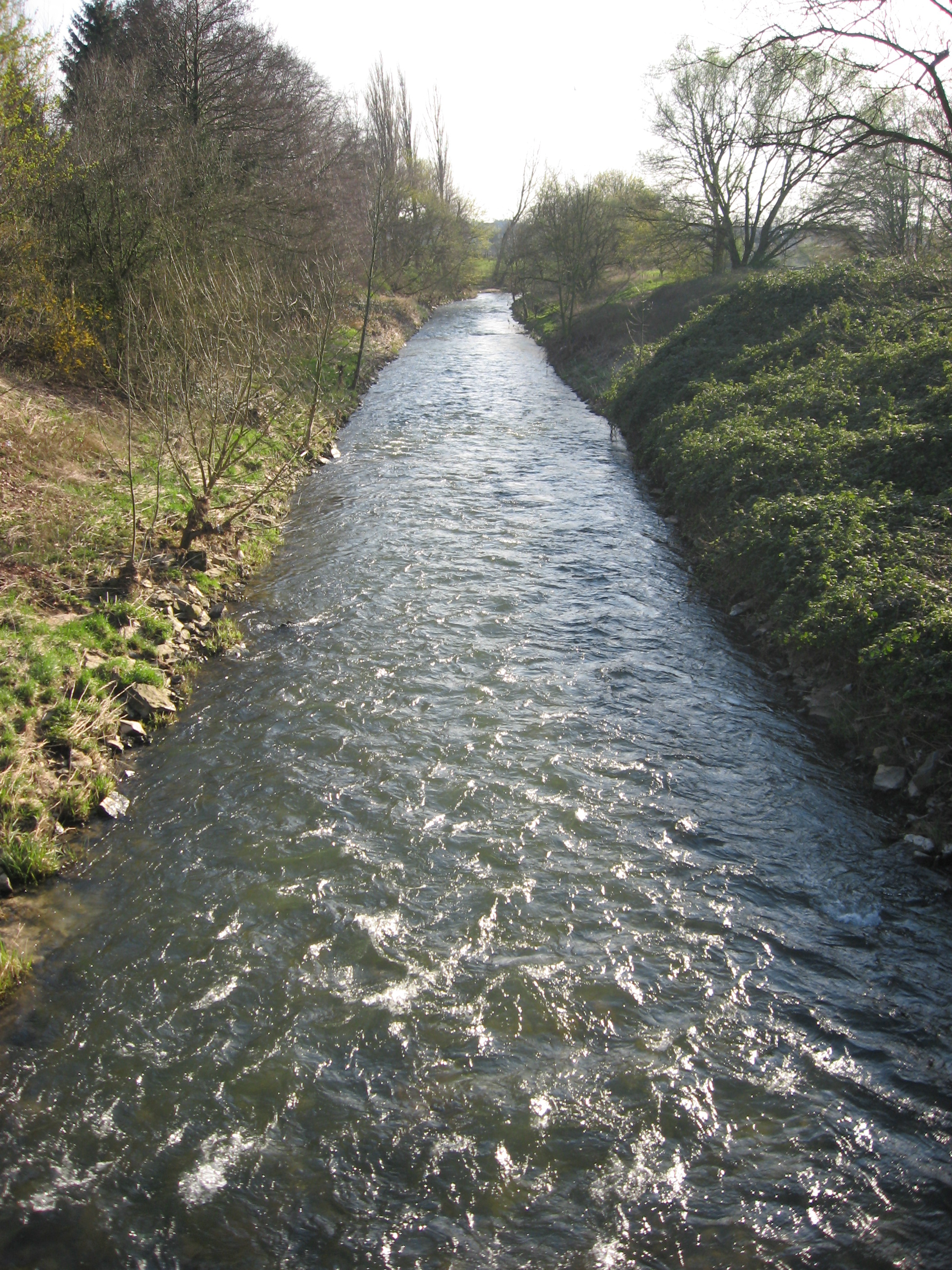

Location
- Country: Germany
- State: North Rhine-Westphalia

Physical characteristics
- Mouth
  - location: Werre
  - coordinates: 52°04′39″N 8°44′25″E
- Length: 42.9 km (26.7 mi)
- Basin size: 377 km^{2} (146 sq mi)

Basin features
- Progression: Werre→ Weser→ North Sea

Bega (German pronunciation: [ˈbeːɡaː]) is a river of North Rhine-Westphalia, Germany. It is a right tributary of the Werre, which it joins in Bad Salzuflen.

== See also ==
- List of rivers of North Rhine-Westphalia
