= Dirk Becker =

German politician (born 1966)

Dirk Becker (born 4 May 1966 in Bielefeld, North Rhine-Westphalia) is a German politician and member of the SPD.

From 2005 to 2015 he was a member of the Bundestag. Since 2015 he has been the mayor of Oerlinghausen.
