= Klaus Daweke =

German politician (1943–2020)

Member of the Bundestag
- In office 14 December 1976 – 20 December 1990

Personal details
- Born: 14 May 1943 Lemgo
- Died: 28 March 2020 (aged 76) Detmold, North Rhine-Westphalia, Germany
- Party: CDU

Klaus Daweke (14 May 1943 – 28 March 2020) was a German politician of the Christian Democratic Union (CDU) and former member of the German Bundestag.

== Life ==
Daweke had been a member of the CDU since 1964. He was chairman of the CDU district association of Lippe from 1977 to 1991 and chairman of the CDU district association of Westphalia-Lippe from 1981 to 1987. He was a member of the German Bundestag from 1976 to 1990. From 1983 to 1987, he represented the constituency of Lippe I in parliament, and in 1976 and 1987, he entered the Bundestag via the state list of the CDU North Rhine-Westphalia. Daweke was a member of the Committee for Education and Science in all election periods.

== Literature ==
Herbst, Ludolf; Jahn, Bruno (2002). Vierhaus, Rudolf (ed.). Biographisches Handbuch der Mitglieder des Deutschen Bundestages. 1949–2002 [Biographical Handbook of the Members of the German Bundestag. 1949–2002] (in German). München: De Gruyter - De Gruyter Saur. p. 1715. ISBN 978-3-11-184511-1.
