= Bad Salzuflen =

- Town
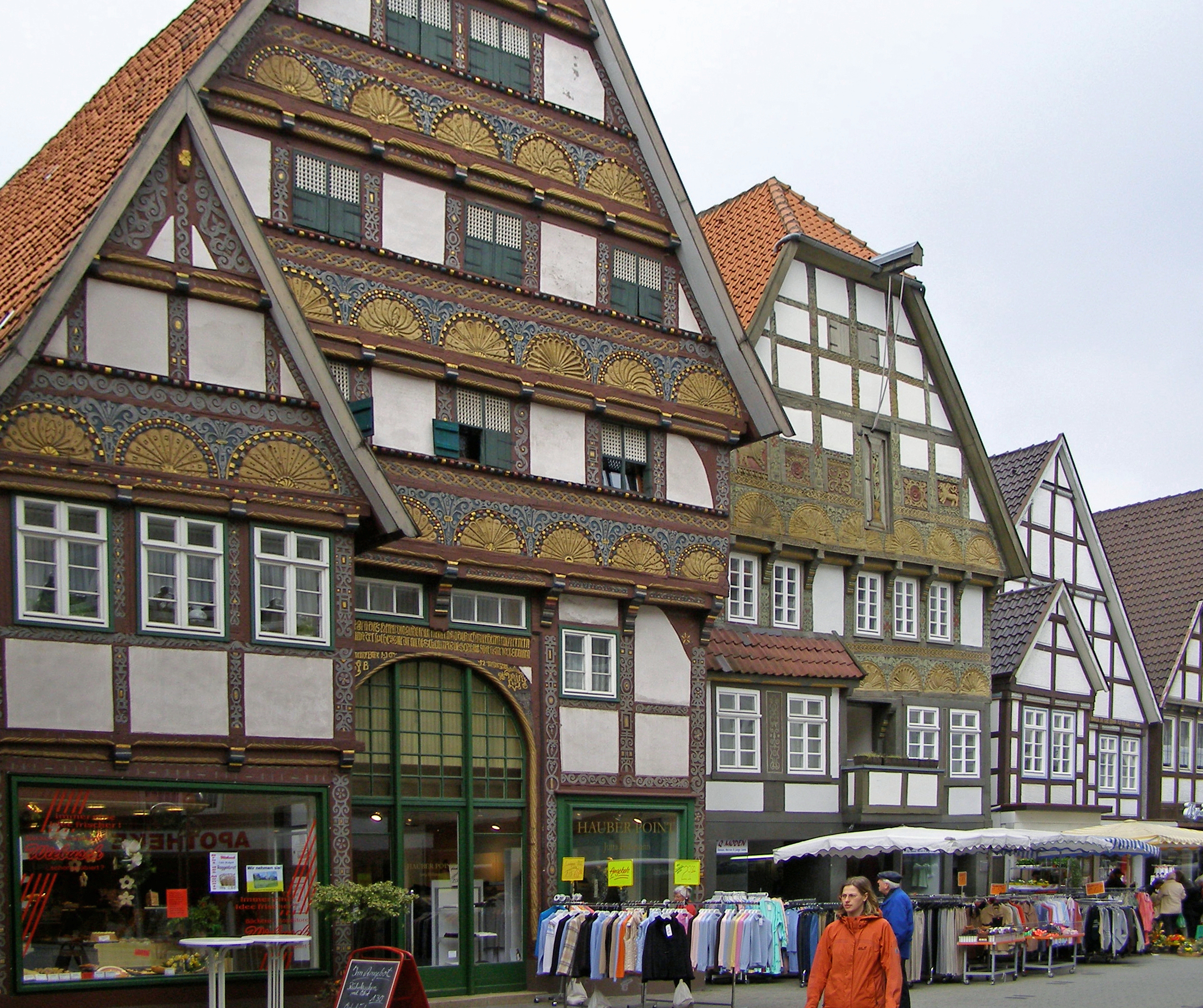

- Coat of arms

- Location of Bad Salzuflen within Lippe district
- Interactive map of Bad Salzuflen
- Location within Germany Location within North Rhine-Westphalia
- Coordinates: 52°05′00″N 08°44′48″E
- Country: Germany
- State: North Rhine-Westphalia
- Admin. region: Detmold
- District: Lippe
- Subdivisions: 11

Government
  - Mayor (2025–30): Dirk Tolkemitt (CDU)

Area
  - Total: 100.05 km^{2} (38.63 sq mi)
- Elevation: 72 m (236 ft)

Population (2025-12-31)
  - Total: 53,807
  - Density: 537.80/km^{2} (1,392.9/sq mi)
- Time zone: UTC+01:00 (CET)
  - Summer (DST): UTC+02:00 (CEST)
- Postal codes: 32105, 32107, 32108
- Dialling codes: 05222, in border areas 0521, 05221, 05232, 05266, 05208, 05228
- Vehicle registration: LIP
- Website: www.stadt-bad-salzuflen.de

Bad Salzuflen (German pronunciation: [baːt zaltsˈʔʊflən]) is a town and thermal spa resort in the Lippe district of North Rhine-Westphalia, Germany. At the end of 2013, it had 52,121 inhabitants.

== Geography ==
Bad Salzuflen lies on the eastern edge of the Ravensberg Basin, at the confluence of the rivers Salze (Bega) with the Werre. Compared with other North Lippe communities it is densely populated. The city centre is surrounded by districts with a village-like feel to them and agricultural land. North east of the River Werre and Salze (Bega) a strand of the Lipper highlands runs through the largely wooded hills with elevations up to 250 metres in the city. The lowest point is on the border of the River Werre at Herford at about 70 metres. Since 2008 the city has been part of the Teutoburg Forest Nature Park / Eggegebirge.

The municipal area is crossed by the river floodplains of the Werre and the Salze. Podzol and Stagnosol brown soils prevail as soil types. The podzolic soils are mainly found in layers from the Tertiary Period, which are crossed by fault block from the Mesozoic. Characteristic of Bad Salzuflen are the saline springs that emerge at these geological folds and which give the region the name of "Germany's healing garden".

Name	Drilled in:	Depth [m]	Temperature [°C]	Used for:	Image
Paulinenquelle	1802	63	12,2	Inhalation; Gradierung	
Loosequelle	1889/91	400	14,25	Drinking Cure	
Leopold- Thermalsprudel	1904/6	534	21,7	Bathing	
Neubrunnen	1913	54	12,2	Bathing	
Gustav Horstmann; Thermalsprudel	1919/27	1018	38,0	Bathing	
Inselquelle	1936	52,4	12,6	Drinking Cure	
Sophienbrunnen	1953	12,5	11,7	Drinking Cure	
Thermalsprudel III	1956/60	412,75	21,4	Bathing	
Sophienquellen (a und b)	1962	49,6; 9,0	13,05; 13,55	Gradation Bathing	

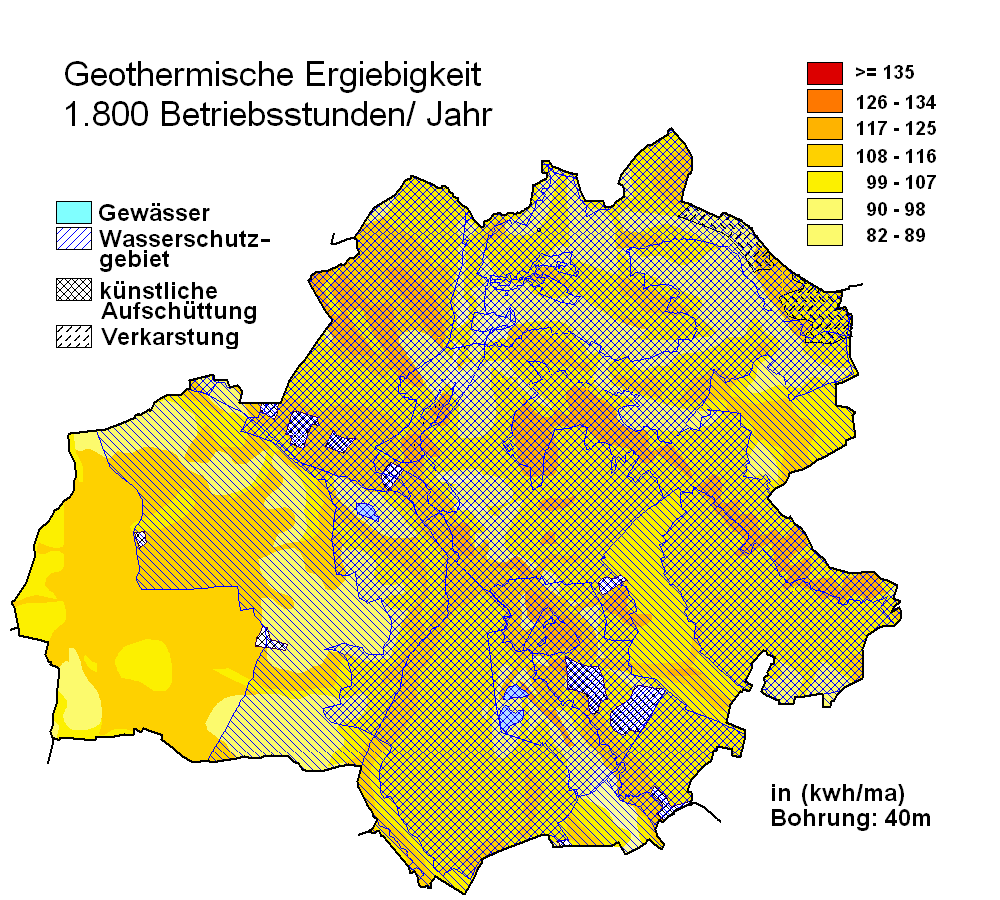
Bad Salzuflen Geothermal map

The geothermal heat sources are of sufficient quality that it makes it viable to use heat recovery systems utilising borehole heat exchangers and heat pumps.

=== Expansion and use of the urban area ===
The part of Bad Salzulfen classified as the main central town covers an area of 100.06 km^{2} (38.63 sq mi). The municipal area has a roughly oval shape, with a maximum extension in east–west direction and 13 km in north–south direction of 11 km.

Area by Use	Agriculture	Forest	Buildings and open space	Traffic area	Water	Sport and green area	Other use	Total
Area in km^{2}	57.51	15.01	17.20	6.30	1.22	2.42	0.40	100.06

=== Neighbouring settlements ===
Bad Salzuflen is bordered to the east by the town of Lemgo, to the south by Lage and on the southwest by Leopoldshöhe. All three communities are part of the district of Lippe. To the west lies the county town of Bielefeld and in the north west, the city of Herford. To the north Bad Salzuflen borders on Vlotho in the district of Herford. Together with Herford, Bad Salzuflen belongs to conurbation of Bielefeld.

=== Areas of the town ===
The city is divided into twelve districts Bad Salzuflen, Biemsen-Ahmsen, Ehrsen-Breden, Grastrup-Hölsen (with Hölserheide), Holzhausen (with Sylbach), Lockhausen, Papenhausen (with Volkhausen) Retzen, Schotmar, Werl-Aspe (with Knetterheide), Wülfer-Bexten and the largest area in the district of Wüsten (with Frettholz, Glimke, Heller Hausen, Hollenstein, Pehlen, Pillenbruch, Voßhagen and Waldemeine). The most populous districts are Bad Salzuflen with about 19,700 inhabitants, Schotmar with 8,900, Werl-Aspe with 7,500 and Wüsten with 4,000 inhabitants (as of 31 December 2006). Together, these four districts over 70% of the population of Bad Salzuflen. The districts of Bad Salzuflen, Schotmar, Werl-Aspe, Holzhausen and Ehrsen-Breden form a continuous area of settlement.

=== Climate ===
Bad Salzuflen displays the typical fully humid temperate climate for Central Europe, with its maximum rainfall during the summer. The annual average temperature of 9.3 °C corresponds to the latitude and the altitude, however, the annual sum of precipitation is 743 mm which is slightly higher than the North German (640 mm) or the German average (690 mm), but due to its location in the rain shadow of the Teutoburg Forest, is slightly lower than the average for Lippe (877 mm).

Climate data for Bad Salzuflen (1991–2020 normals)
Month	Jan	Feb	Mar	Apr	May	Jun	Jul	Aug	Sep	Oct	Nov	Dec	Year
Mean daily maximum °C (°F)	4.3 (39.7)	5.5 (41.9)	9.3 (48.7)	14.3 (57.7)	18.2 (64.8)	21.1 (70.0)	23.4 (74.1)	23.2 (73.8)	19.0 (66.2)	13.8 (56.8)	8.4 (47.1)	5.1 (41.2)	13.8 (56.8)
Daily mean °C (°F)	2.1 (35.8)	2.6 (36.7)	5.5 (41.9)	9.6 (49.3)	13.3 (55.9)	16.2 (61.2)	18.3 (64.9)	18.0 (64.4)	14.3 (57.7)	10.1 (50.2)	5.9 (42.6)	2.9 (37.2)	9.9 (49.8)
Mean daily minimum °C (°F)	−0.2 (31.6)	−0.1 (31.8)	2.0 (35.6)	4.9 (40.8)	8.2 (46.8)	11.2 (52.2)	13.4 (56.1)	13.4 (56.1)	10.3 (50.5)	6.9 (44.4)	3.5 (38.3)	0.7 (33.3)	6.2 (43.2)
Average precipitation mm (inches)	76.8 (3.02)	58.6 (2.31)	57.2 (2.25)	45.8 (1.80)	60.0 (2.36)	70.6 (2.78)	78.6 (3.09)	79.7 (3.14)	67.7 (2.67)	67.0 (2.64)	65.9 (2.59)	75.3 (2.96)	799.1 (31.46)
Average precipitation days (≥ 1.0 mm)	18.9	16.7	16.4	13.6	14.5	14.7	16.2	15.2	14.2	17.0	18.5	20.0	195.6
Average snowy days (≥ 1.0 cm)	6.2	6.6	2.6	0.1	0	0	0	0	0	0	1.2	5.1	21.8
Average relative humidity (%)	84.9	81.2	76.1	69.7	71.1	72.9	72.7	73.3	78.9	83.2	86.1	86.6	78.1
Mean monthly sunshine hours	49.5	71.8	117.1	168.2	202.6	199.2	204.5	189.4	142.8	106.5	52.5	41.3	1,536.6
Source: World Meteorological Organization

== History ==
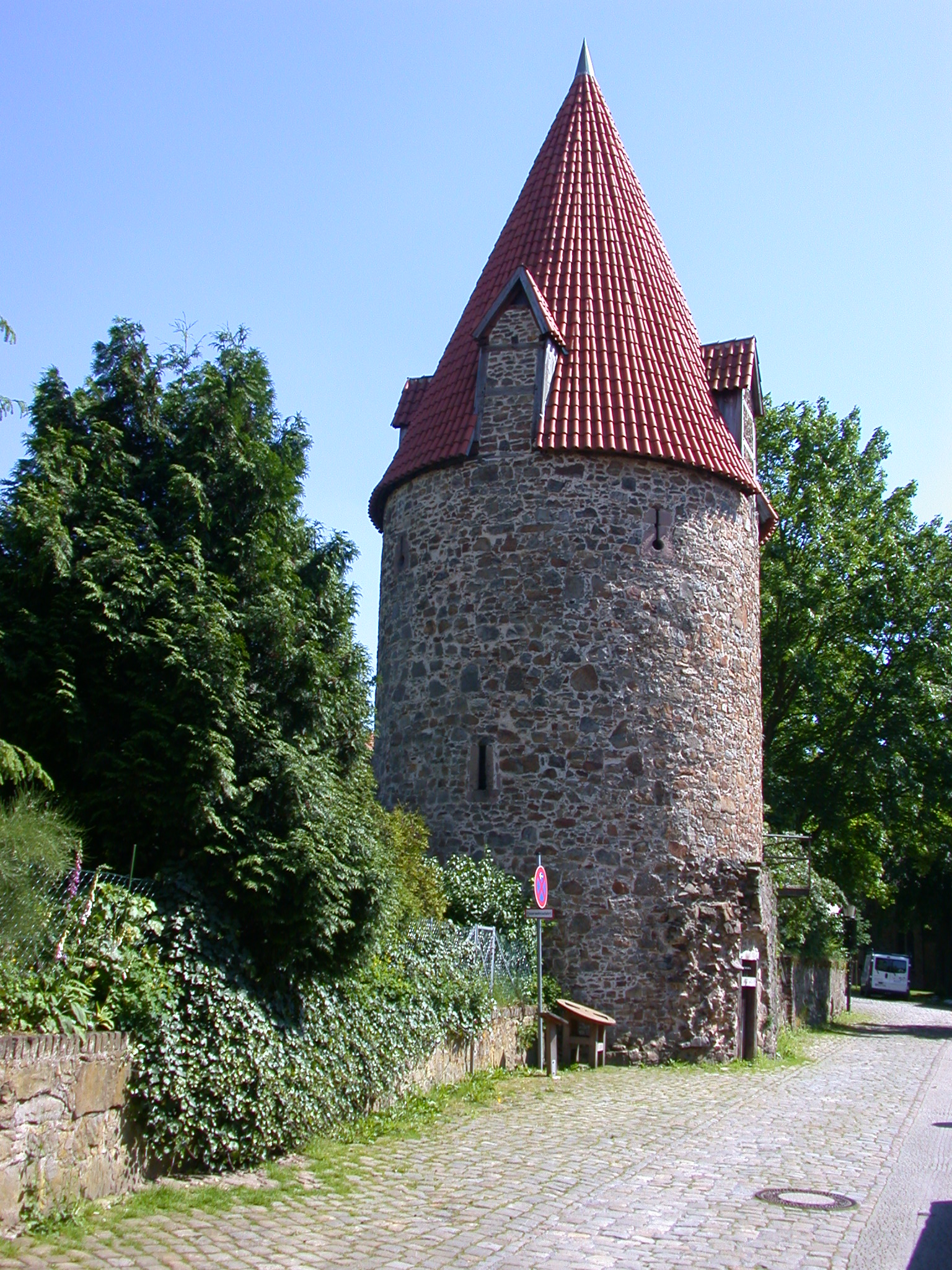
Der Katzenturm

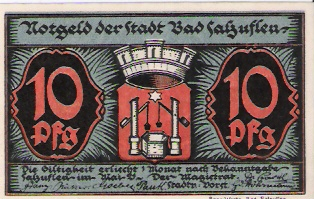
Notgeld der Stadt Bad Salzuflen

The first mention of the settlement of Uflon comes in the middle of the eleventh century and of a place of salt nearby. In Old High German "Uflon" means The Woods/Forest. This later evolved into Uflen, Mitteluflen and Dorf Uflen. Therefore, the entire name means The salt baths in the woods.

It was the use of the Pauline salt source in the Middle Ages that led to the establishment of the first Saline. These salt workshops were located at a place which is still called the Salt Yard or Salzhof and the well is represented in the town's coat of arms. Thanks to the lucrative salt trade and the promotion of the town to a city by the Counts of Sternberg, it was fortified with a circular wall and four gates. The Schliepsteiner gateway lies to the north (toward Exter), Heßkamper gateway to North East (toward Wüsten), Arminius to the southeast (toward Schotmar) and Herford Gateway to the West (toward Herford) with three fortified towers which also included the Katzenturm which can still be seen today. Until the Thirty Years' War, trading flourished with the white gold and brought great wealth to the town. The old houses, the sumptuous Bürgerhäuser and the Town Hall built in 1545/47 bear witness to this. The oldest surviving building in the city today is a three-storey Traufenbau of 1520.

Map of the city wall

Bad Salzuflen was made famous by its cures. With its three drinking water, three thermal and three salt springs it had the status of a Lippischer State bath. Although the founding of the royal Solebads was made nearly 100 years ago, Salzuflen only received the additional name "Bad" on 14 April 1914.

Bad Salzuflen was one of the few cities in the Middle Ages that did not suffer from financial difficulties because of its salt production, its topographical position and its thriving commercial development. This is proven today by the many beautiful houses with their typical architectural style for that time. The high healing properties of the water meant that new bath houses were built and other sources were drilled, such as the Leopoldsprudel whose sacred well is in the midst of today's spa gardens. The development of the resort led to significant changes in the cityscape. The saltworks on the Salzhof discontinued salt production and is now the "town square" where the weekly market and town festivals take place. The Gradierwerke developed into a place that people with respiratory diseases retreated to. Over time, the long-established industry sectors disappeared and were replaced by the trading and spa industry, which benefited the numerous inns of the city.

The economic boom in the nineteenth century was also closely followed by the founding in 1850 of the Hoffmann starch factories that later rose to be the biggest European starch producers. The strategic location of Bad Salzuflen was rather insignificant and so was preserved largely during the Second World War from Allied bombing raids, and survived the war relatively unscathed after the war ended.

Between 1909 and 1924, the Bad Salzufler und Schötmarschen Straßenbahn GmbH plied their trade between those towns. From 1963, the Herford Light railway ran between the towns of Wallenbrück, Spenge, Herford, Vlotho, Weserhafen and the west of Herford.

== Population ==
Historical population

Year	Pop.	±% p.a.
1965	45,977	—
1970	49,571	+1.52%
1975	50,921	+0.54%
1980	51,245	+0.13%
1985	50,809	−0.17%
1990	53,771	+1.14%
1995	55,029	+0.46%

Year	Pop.	±% p.a.
2000	55,028	−0.00%
2005	54,673	−0.13%
2010	53,893	−0.29%
2015	53,341	−0.21%
2020	54,166	+0.31%
2025	53,807	−0.13%

Source: Landesdatabank Nordrhein-Westfalen

== Religion ==
In Bad Salzuflen, there are a variety of different religious communities. As the town is in the Protestant dominated Lippe District, they outweigh other evangelical Christians. The Evangelical Reformed Congregation are a part of the reformed Lippe Church and the Evangelical Lutheran congregation are unique in the town. There is a small Roman Catholic presence in the town as well as Baptists, Methodists, Gospel Christians, Mennonite Brethren, New Apostolics and Seventh-day Adventists. There is also a small Muslim community with a mosque in the town.

According to the 2011 census, there were 11.6% Roman Catholic Church and 54.5% Evangelical Church with other religions and those stating no religion making up the remaining 33.9%.

=== Churches ===
At the site of today's Evangelical Reformed Church of St. Kilian (neogothic) on the Kirchplatz in Schotmar stood the original building from around the year 800 AD, the first Christian church in the region. She is the mother parish for many villages in the surrounding area. It is a three-aisled neo-Gothic hall church. The west tower has an octagonal floor, which is crowned by a lantern-like roof riders with steep roof.

The Evangelical Reformed City Church is located on the area known as Hallenbrink, the highest elevation within the old town. The core of the late medieval hall building was rebuilt in 1762 after a fire. In 1892 there was a comprehensive renovation and expansion of the building. The most important piece is the pulpit made in 1765 by Heinrich Kamp Meyer. The community center near the town church is a stucco building with stepped gables, built in 1928 in expressionist style.

The Evangelical Lutheran Church of the Redeemer in the Martin-Luther-Straße is run under supervision by Karl Siebold (Schildesche), a neo-Romanesque church built around 1891–1892 after a design by architect Hermann Held (Bethel). The foundation stone was laid on 12 July 1891, the inauguration took place on 8 May 1892, the Jubilate Sunday. In 1908–1909 the church was enlarged by Karl Siebold to the western part with tower. A new extension was carried out in 1939 by Gerhard Balke (Bethel).

The Catholic Church of Our Lady is at the corner of Grabenstraße and Woldemarstraße. The groundbreaking ceremony was on 23 September 1956 which began construction of the church, which was designed by the architect Joseph Lucas in Paderborn, with the foundation stone laid on 8 December 1956. The consecration took place on 8 March 1959 under the title: "Mary, Our Lady, Queen of Peace."

The Evangelical Lutheran Church of the Resurrection on the corner Gröchteweg and Volkhausenstraße was built in 1964–1966 by the architect Loos (Bad Salzuflen). A significant contribution by the artist couple Hans-Helmuth von Rath and Margarete von Rath (Bad Salzuflen) can be seen in the artwork. The foundation stone was laid on 13 July 1964, and on 1 May 1966 the Jubilate Sunday, the church was consecrated. The Church of the Resurrection is used by the Lutheran and Reformed churches.

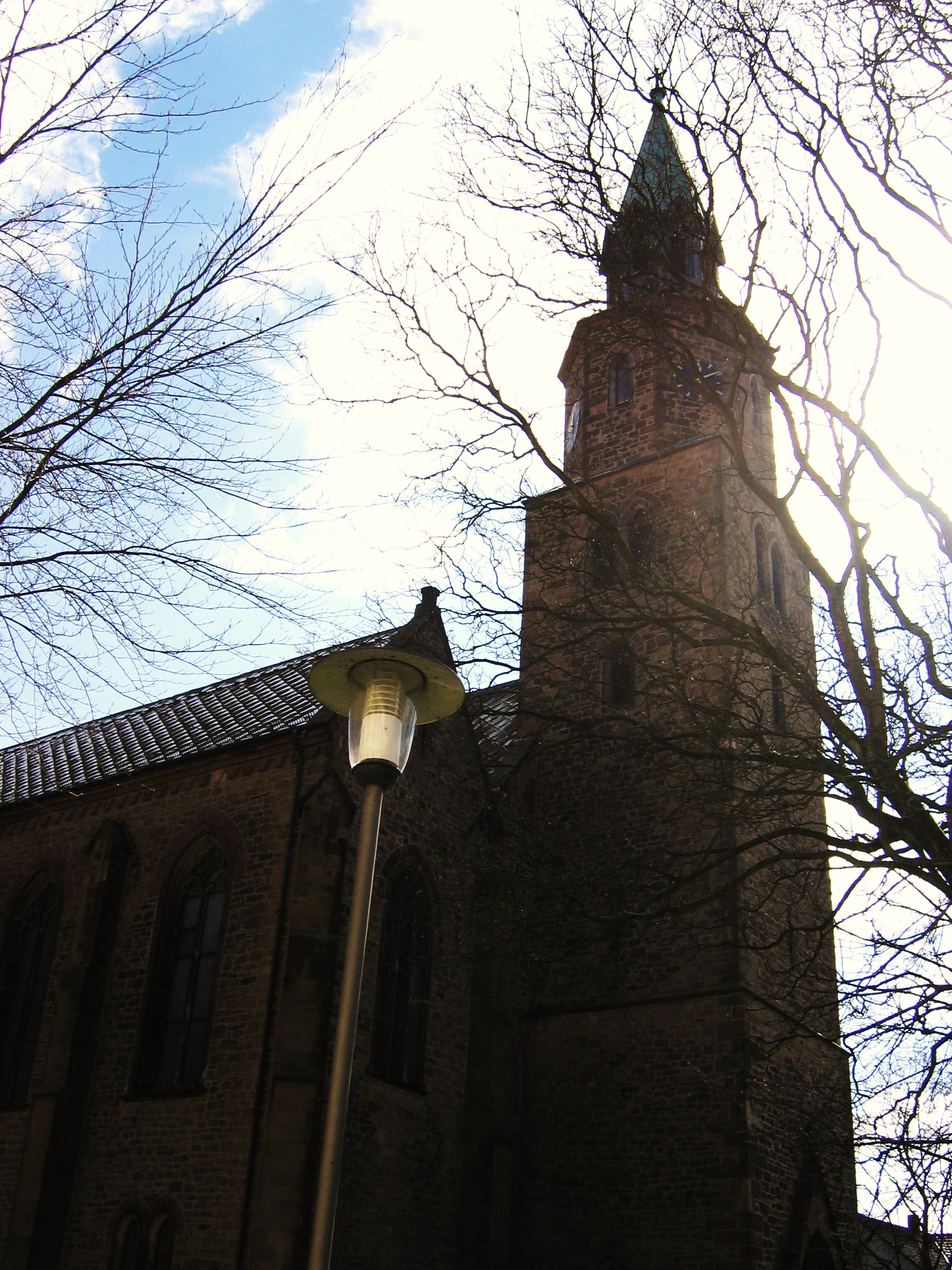
Kilianskirche - Evangelical Reformed Church of St. Kilian

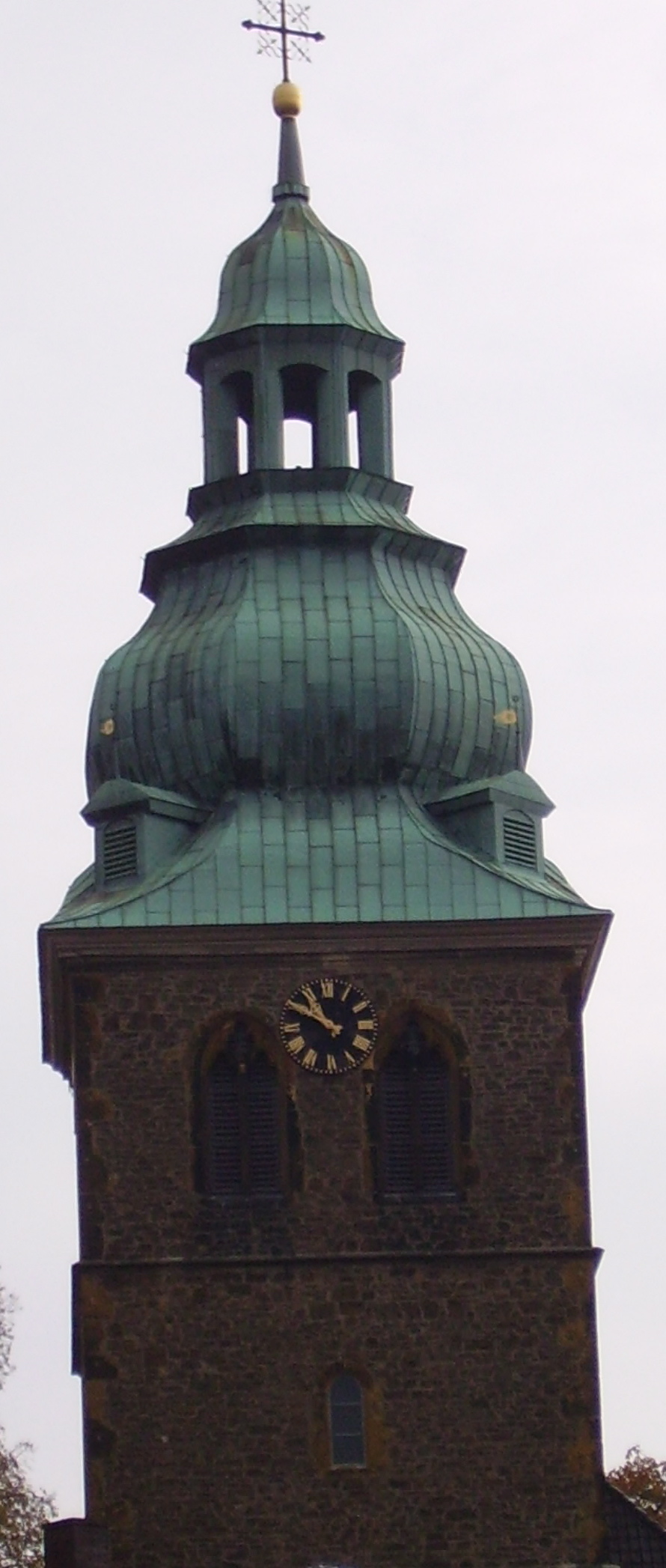
Tower of the Stadtkirche on the Hallenbrink

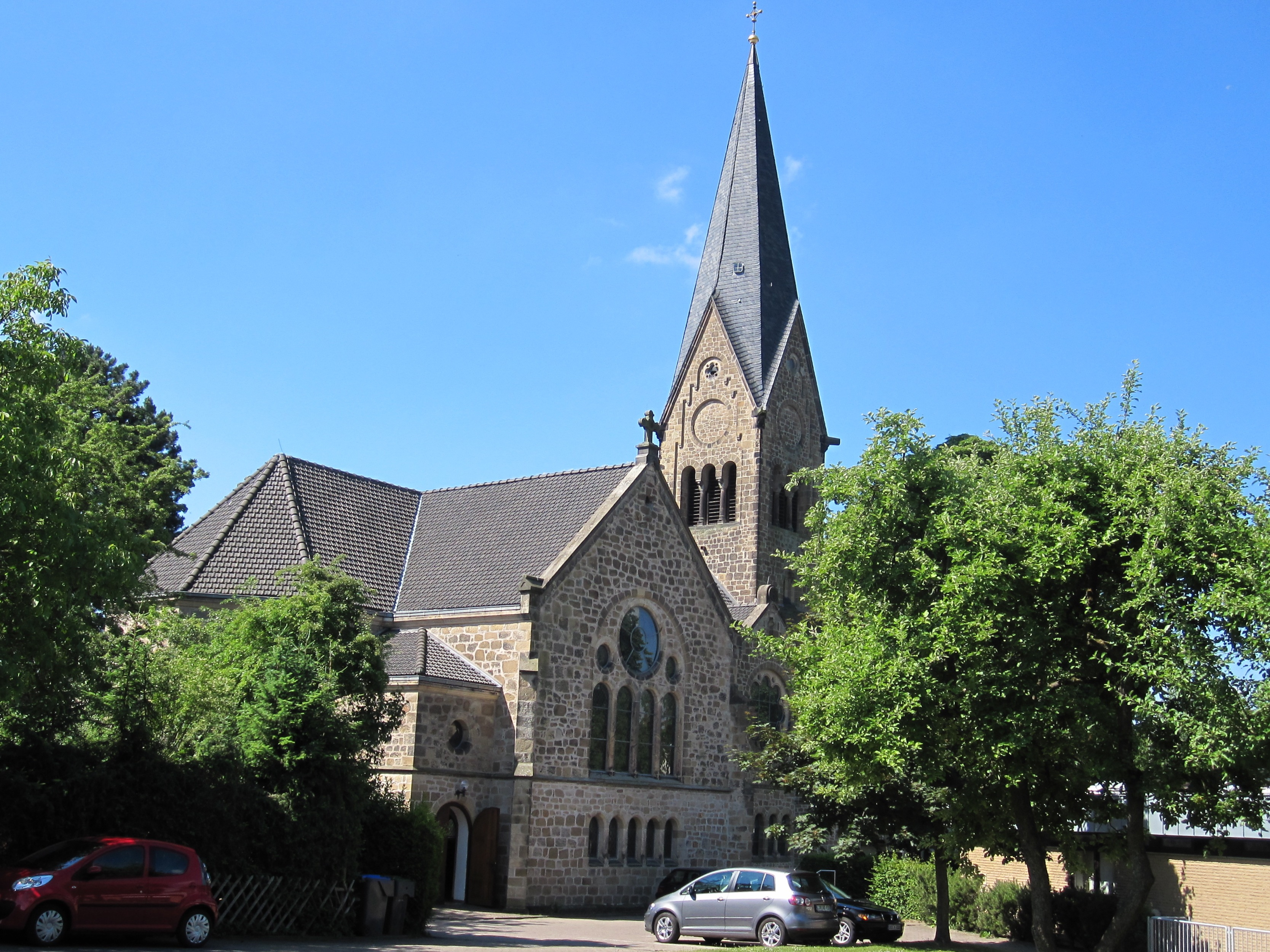
Erlöserkirche - Evangelical Lutheran Church of the Redeemer

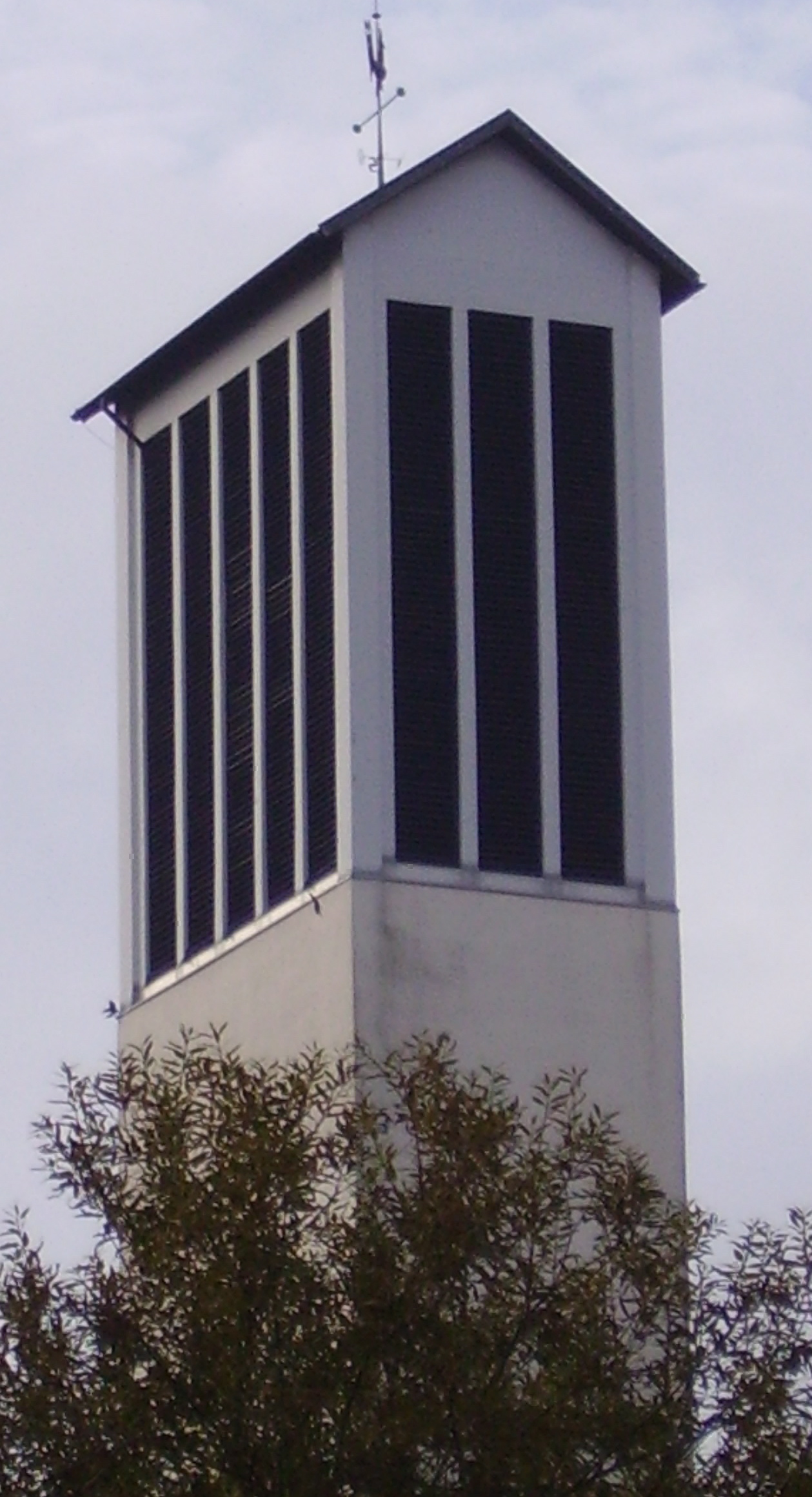
Liebfrauenkirche - Catholic Church of Our Lady

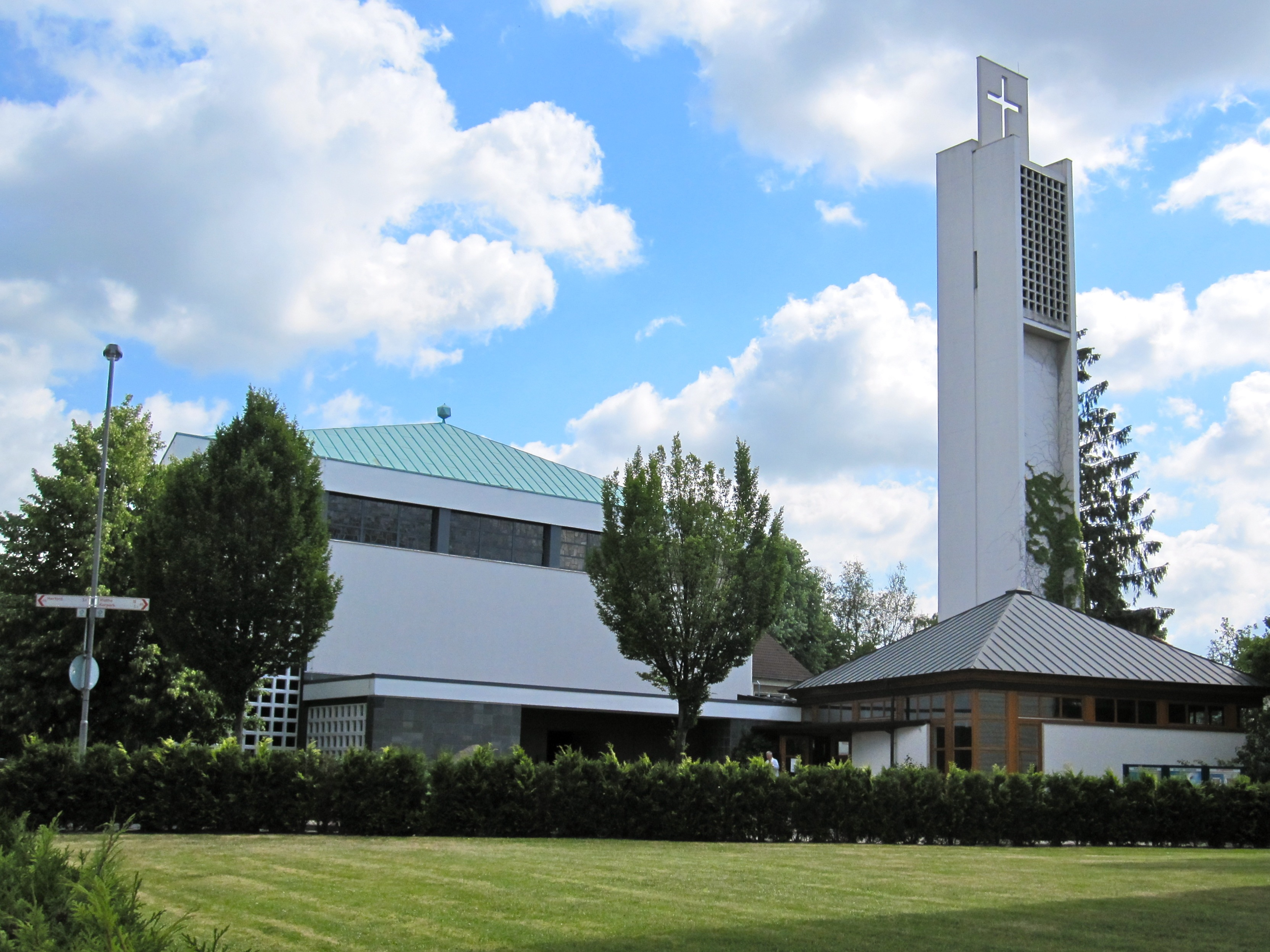
Auferstehungskirche - Evangelical Lutheran Church of the Resurrection

== Governance ==
Two years after the division of the Free State of Lippe into districts, Bad Salzuflen was incorporated into in the county of Lemgo in 1934. On 1 January 1969, as part of the implementation of the "Law for the reorganization of the district Lemgo", part of the North Rhine-Westphalian territorial reform, the new town of Bad Salzuflen was formed from the two towns of Bad Salzuflen and Schotmar and the ten municipalities Biemsen-Ahmsen, Ehrsen-Breden, Grastrup-Hölsen, Holzhausen, Lockhausen, Papenhausen, Retzen, Werl-Aspe, Wülfer-Bexten and Wüsten.

As part of the implementation of the Bielefeld Act, the districts of Lemgo and Detmold were, on the first January 1973, merged to form the new District of Lippe, to which Bad Salzuflen has since belonged.

Bad Salzuflen is part of the parliamentary constituency Lippe I, which is represented by Kerstin Vieregge (CDU), Robin Wagener (The Greens) and Udo Hemmelgarn (AfD) since the 2025 federal election.

=== City Council ===
The City Council currently has 48 seats. The Chairman of the City Council is mayor Dirk Tolkemitt (CDU) who has voting rights. The following table shows the local election results since 1975:

	2025		2020		2014		2009		2004		1999		1994		1989		1984		1979		1975	
Party	Seats	%	Seats	%	Seats	%	Seats	%	Seats	%	Seats	%	Seats	%	Seats	%	Seats	%	Seats	%	Seats	%
CDU	22	31,05	22	33,82	17	36,32	17	35,47	18	37,69	25	52,87	23	46,83	20	37,34	21	39,77	24	46,23	24	46,31
SPD	15	22,13	16	25,28	16	34,1	16	34,15	18	36,58	16	32,48	20	40,42	24	46,38	23	43,83	23	45,86	23	44,40
FDP	3	3,86	4	6,41	3	6,12	5	10,13	4	6,99	3	5,07	0	4,84	4	8,88	3	6,87	4	7,92	4	9,29
GRÜNE	8	10,77	12	18,3	4	8,67	4	8,38	4	7,35	2	4,75	4	7,91	3	7,40	4	9,44	–	–	–	–
AfD	13	19,02	3	5,48	–	–	–	–	–	–	–	–	–	–	–	–	–	–	–	–	–	–
FWG^{1}	1	2,01	3	4,43	3	5,75	2	3,81	2	5,18	2	4,83	–	–	–	–	–	–	–	–	–	–
LINKE	4	5,38	1	2,02	2	3,82	2	3,40	0	2,38	–	–	–	–	–	–	–	–	–	–	–	–
AUFBRUCH C^{2}	–	–	1	1,33	–	–	–	–	–	–	–	–	–	–	–	–	–	–	–	–	–	–
PIRATEN	–	–	0	0,88	1	2,12	–	–	–	–	–	–	–	–	–	–	–	–	–	–	–	–
USD^{3}	4	5,07	–	–	–	–	–	–	–	–	–	–	–	–	–	–	–	–	–	–	–	–
WFU^{4}	–	–	–	–	–	–	1	2,62	2	3,83	–	–	–	–	–	–	–	–	–	–	–	–
BLBS^{5}	–	–	–	–	1	1,52	–	–	–	–	–	–	–	–	–	–	–	–	–	–	–	–
BIZ^{6}	–	–	0	0,98	1	1,59	1	2,06	–	–	–	–	–	–	–	–	–	–	–	–	–	–
DKP	–	–	–	–	–	–	–	–	–	–	–	–	–	–	–	–	0	0,10	–	–	–	–
Total^{7}	70	100	62	100	48	100	48	100	48	100	48	100	47	100	51	100	51	100	51	100	51	100
Turnout	53,04		49,30		49,49		52,47		57,62		55,62		82,72		67,76		70,24		75,38		88,24	

^{1}Free Voters Community
^{2}Departure C – Christian Values for humane politics
^{3}Independent Salzufler Democrats e.V..
^{4}All for one
^{5}Colourful List Bad Salzuflen e.V.
^{6}Citizens Initiative for Future
^{7}regardless of rounding errors

=== Mayor ===
Since 2020, Dirk Tolkemitt (CDU) has been the full-time mayor of the city. He was preceded by Roland Thomas (SPD, 2015–2020), Wolfgang Honsdorf (SPD, 2004–2015), Gerhard Kleemann (CDU, 1999–2004) and Heinz-Wilhelm Quentmeier (SPD, 1982–1999).

=== Coat of arms ===
The Bad Salzuflen coat of arms shows a hexagonal blue red well shaft with two silver (white) Galgen trees, on which hangs a rising gold (yellow) bucket to the front and behind, below a golden (yellow) eight-pointed star. The star indicates the town formerly belonging to the County of Sternberg.

== Demography ==
Population development by the end of 1968, only Salzuflen, *= census results:

Year	1590	1633	1636 (to Pest)	1760	1885 * (1.12.)	1892 * (7.12.)	1900	1916	1933	1946	1960 (21.7.)	1968 (31.12.)
Population	~ 2.000	1.472	865	1.003	3.992	4.300	5.396	7.919	9.217	14.090	17.273	16.690

With the establishment of the "new" town of Bad Salzuflen on 1 January 1969, Bad Salzuflen and Schotmar with the ten districts, there were 47,930 inhabitants, which corresponds to a population density of 479 inhabitants per square kilometer (currently 543 inhabitants / km ²)

Population in the districts of Bad Salzuflen on 1 January 1969:

District	Population	Area (km^{2})	Population/km^{2}
Bad Salzuflen	16.690	13,76	1.213
Schötmar	9.132	4,89	1.867
Biemsen-Ahmsen	1.493	5,90	253
Ehrsen-Breden	2.498	7,00	357
Grastrup-Hölsen	1.019	7,90	129
Holzhausen	2.865	8,36	343
Lockhausen	2.706	9,32	290
Papenhausen	115	3,12	37
Retzen	1.436	7,14	201
Werl-Aspe	5.083	6,31	806
Wülfer-Bexten	1.683	7,74	217
Wüsten	3.181	18,62	171
Total	47.901	100,06	479

Development of the population as of 1 January 1969, all data for the town of Bad Salzuflen in the borders since 1969, as each 31 December of the previous year

Year	1969	2000	2002	2003	2004	2005	2006	2007	2013
Population	47.901	55.028	55.145	54.020	54.772	54.673	54.413	54.273	52.121

== Culture and community ==
=== Theatre ===
The spa and town theatre has 498 seats but does not have its own ensemble. It is regularly played by the National Detmold and other visiting ensembles. The Detmold State ensemble regularly plays at the theatre.

=== Parks ===
On Kurgastzentrum is the entrance to the Kurpark and is adjacent to the Country Park. There are 120 acres available for long walks and are one of the largest town parklands in Germany.

The Kurpark of 1907 extends along the Salze river with lawns, mature trees and a large floral inventory with entrance controlled by a ticket attendant. Exiting at the large Kurparksee, where can be found a fountain and boat hire, charges do not apply and landscaped gardens can be found emptying onto the urban forest with hiking and biking trails up to the Salzuflen Bismarck Tower on the Vierenberg, Loose and the Herford Bismarck tower.

Located in the middle of Kurpark stands the landmark of Bad Salzuflen. The fountain temple of the Leopold thermal bubble. With the development of the spa in 1906 to a 534 m depth, it linked Salzuflen to the thermal bath.

In the district Schotmar part of the castle of Stietencron contains a park with old trees.

=== Sport ===
Nationally successful clubs are the SG Knetterheide/Schotmar that play in the Women's Regional Handball Leagues and in table tennis the clubs of TuS Bexterhagen and SC Bad Salzuflen, both of which compete at the national league level. Also of some importance was the HC 93 Bad Salzuflen, which in the past competed in the 2nd Handball-Bundesliga, before being dissolved. Since the 2008/2009 season, the football team of the SC Bad Salzuflen plays in the Landesliga.

=== Regular events ===
Farmer's Markets in Schotmar take place in the market on Wednesdays and Saturdays, and on the Salzhof, weekly on Tuesdays, Thursdays and Saturdays in the morning. In the winter months the Thursday market is omitted from the beginning of November.

The Bad-Salzuflen Marathon takes place annually, since it first ran in 1993, on the last Saturday in February. It is organized by the LC 92 Bad Salzuflen. Kilian Festival is an annual festival in honor of St. Kilian Schotmar held in October. The Salzsiederfest is held annually in May in honor of the saltworkers. The Weihnachtstraum is an annual Christmas market on the Salzhof and throughout the city from the end of November to Christmas.

== Economy ==
=== Transport ===
==== Roads ====
Bad Salzuflen lies on Bundesstraße 239. The A2 (E34) runs near the city and has easy accessibility to Junction 28 from the Ostwestfalenstraße and Junction 29 from the 239 feeder road. Today Lockhauser Straße connects the eastern and the western part of the city. The two previously existing roads over the Bega and Werre rivers were not able to accommodate the traffic in the city. Therefore, in the early 1980s the construction of a four-lane elevated highway was needed in the city.

==== Bus and rail ====
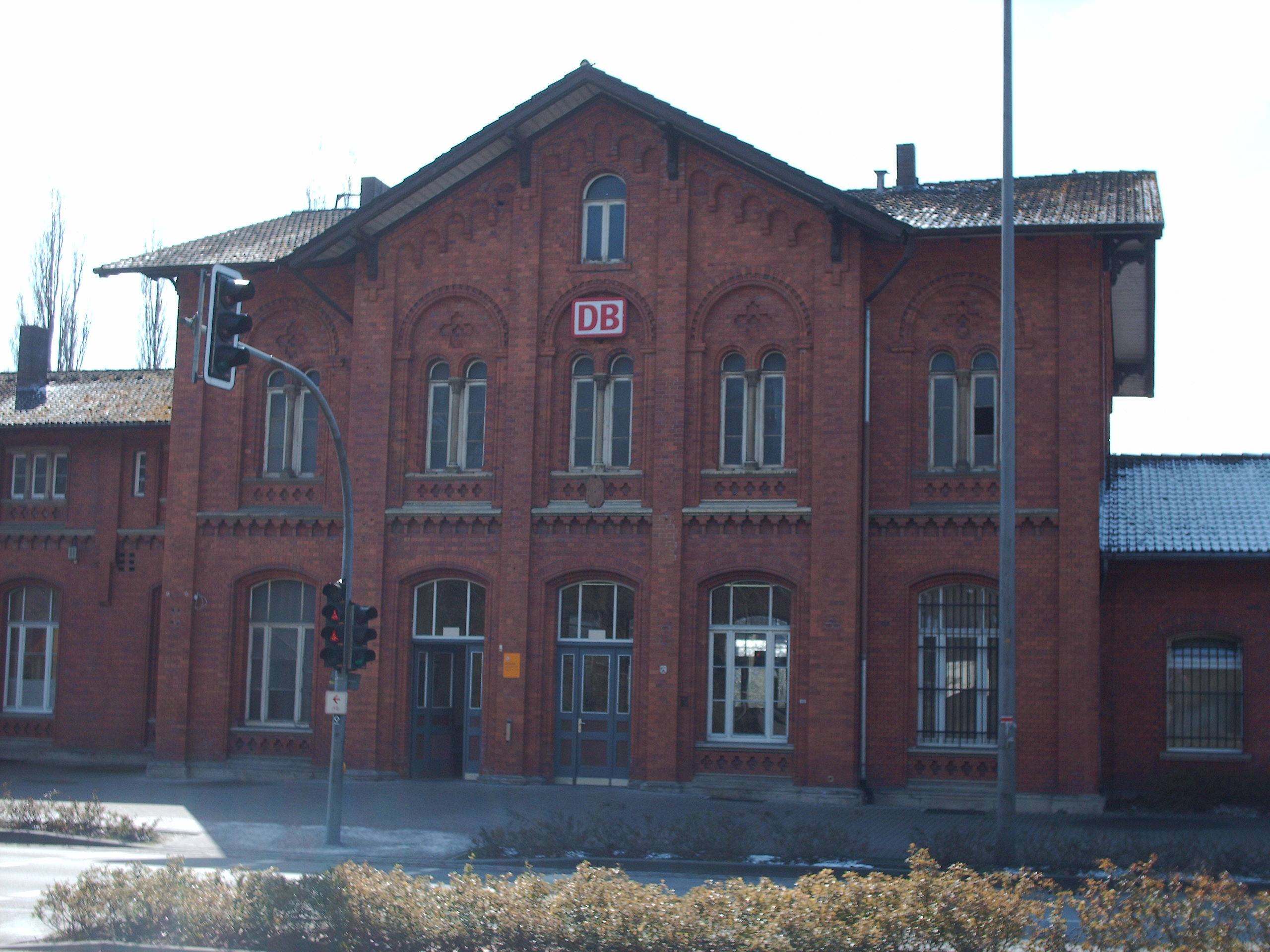
Empfangsgebäude des Bahnhofs Bad Salzuflen Entrance Hall of the Station

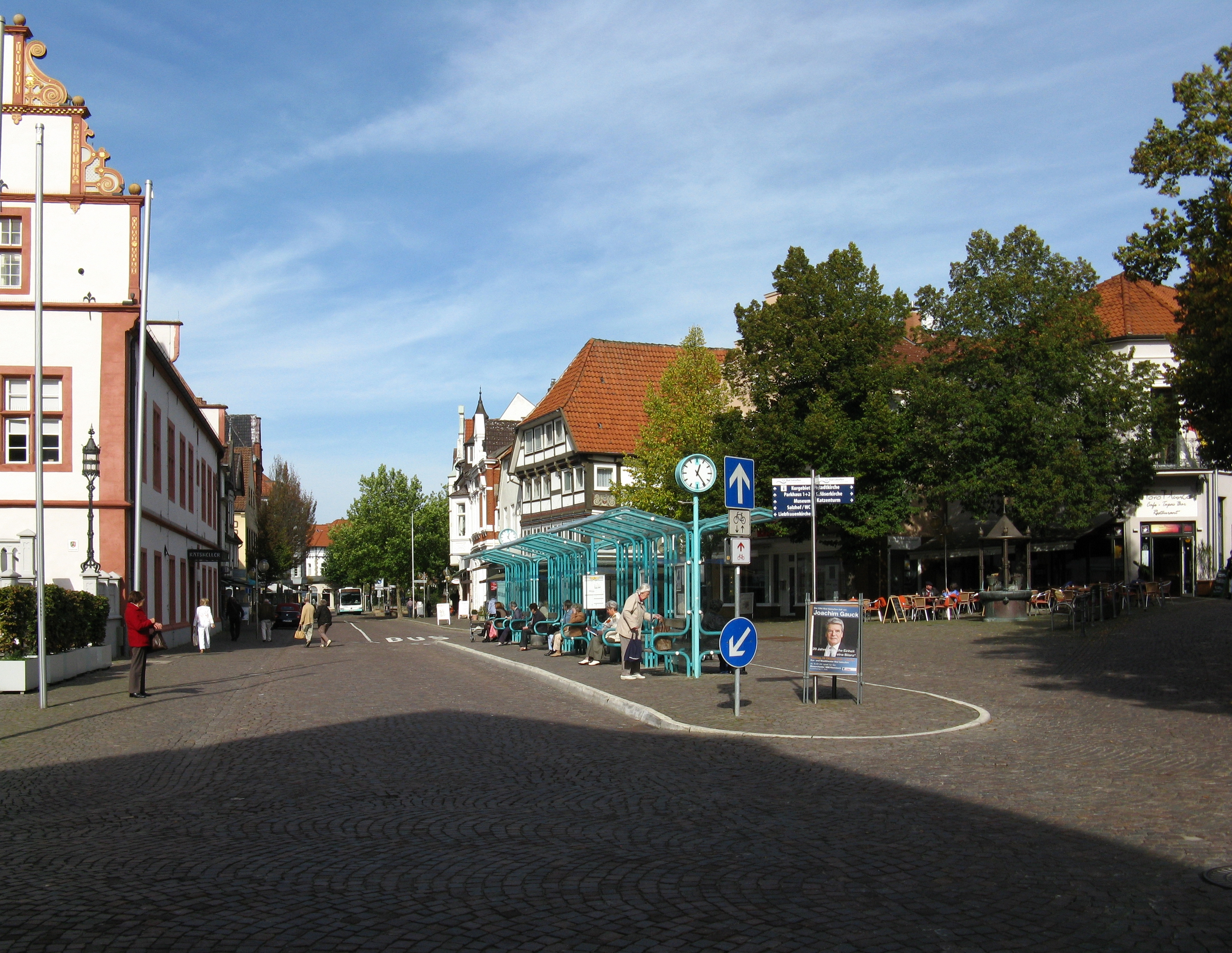
Zentraler Bustreffpunkt „Am Markt" Central bus terminus (2016)

The central Bus station is called Am Markt. The city has four bus routes running hourly services which all run through Am Markt. All routes are operated by Bad Salzuflen GmbH, a subsidiary of Stadtwerke Bad Salzuflen. The surrounding cities of Bielefeld, Herford, Lemgo and on weekdays Oerlinghausen Vlotho-Exter are accessible by local buses from the bus station. Bad Salzuflen is part of the tariff association known as "The Six" (OWL Transport GmbH). In the spa area operates a round route tourist service, the "Pauline-train". Starting point is the main entrance to the spa, at the Gradierwerk.

Commissioned in 1881, the Bad Saluflen Rail Station lay on the Herford to Altenbeken line. Now it is known as Regional Railway route 72, the Ostwestfalenbahn, running an hourly service calling at Herford, Lage, Detmold, Altenbeken, Paderborn. Additianl stops in the town are at Schötmar and Holzhausen (Haltepunkt Sylbach).

==== Cycling ====
The long-distance Wellness cycle path and cycle route from Weser to Lippe traverse Bad Salzuflen. In addition, there are local bike paths, including the Soleradweg cycle path. In the Landschaftskurpark is a bike lane marked, but all other paths in the park are closed to cyclists. A heavily utilized cycling and footpath leads directly to the Werre along to Herford.

=== Notable businesses ===
Alba Moda, a mail order company for women's wear and swim wear. Essmann, manufacturing and sales roof lighting, venting and drainage, smoke and heat removal, smoke and fire. Dorma Glass, producer of fittings for glass doors. Maritim Hotel Company, specializes in conferences and congresses, as the second largest hotel chain in Germany. Median clinics operate the Burggrabenkliniken and the hospital Flachsheide. Sollich KG, maker of special machines for the confectionery industry. Lippische Nervenklinik Dr. Spernau GmbH & Co run a psychiatric-psychotherapeutic acute hospital in the district of Lippe.

Hoffmann's Stärkefabriken, starch manufacturing, was among the oldest industrial companies in Bad Salzuflen. The factory was established on 29 September 1850 by Henry Salomon Hoffmann and was founded on today's Hoffmannstraße. The largest European producers of starch at its height employed, around the turn of the century, about 1,200 employees and was not only the most powerful business enterprises in Salzuflen, but also in Lippe. The Ciba-Geigy AG of Basel took over the majority of shares in 1981, and in 1985 was taken over by the British firm Reckitt & Colman PLC, which ceased production at the site in Salzuflen in 1990. The distribution of Hoffmann's products is done today by Reckitt Benckiser from Slough near London.

=== Education ===
The town has eight primary schools and twenty-three Kindergartens. The districts of Lohfeld and Aspe each have a secondary school, junior high school and high school. In addition, there is the Erich Kästner-Schule, a school for children with learning difficulties. In 2007, the schools in the town had 372 teachers who taught a total of 5614 students, of which 36.5% in primary schools, 13.3% of secondary schools and 21% of secondary schools, 25.3% of high schools, as well as 3, 9% at the special school.

== Spa and health facilities ==
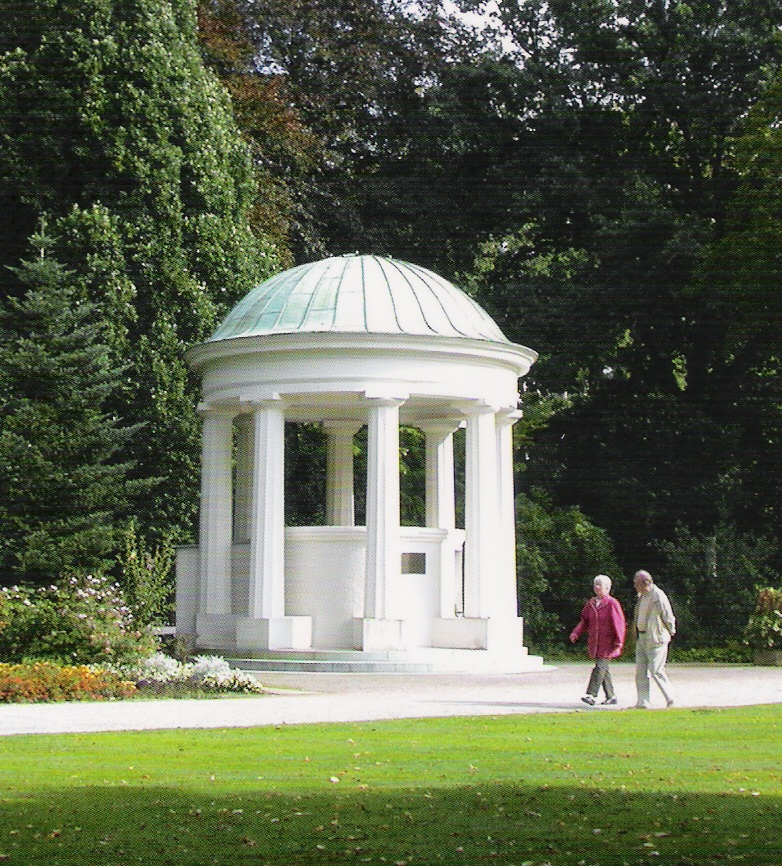
Leopoldsprudel in the Kur- und Landschaftspark Bad Salzuflen

A remnant of the salt mining, the Gradierwerke had a total length of 424 meters before today's length of about 300 m. Of the original four existing salt works, only two are completely preserved. A third, whose origins date back to the seventeenth century, had to be closed due to disrepair. It was rebuilt after a Council decision as Erlebnisgradierwerk and inaugurated again on 28 July 2007 Festival in July 2007. The salt works are now operated only for short cures. The brine trickles down, the air is enriched near the salt works with the salt, the water droplets bind particles in the air. Inhaling salty air moistens the respiratory tract and positively affects the walls of the respiratory organs. In addition, the fine salt crystals have an expectoprant action on secretions, which intensively cleanse the respiratory of bacteria and can reduce swelling of the mucous membranes.

Health resort and spa in the city theater, Parkstraße and Wandelhalle (1960–1961) and Konzerthalle (1962–1963) in the park are excellent examples of resort architecture of the 1960s. Kurgastzentrum (1980–1983) designed by the architectural firm Behnisch & Partner. In 1985 it won awards by the Association of German Architects of North Rhine-Westphalia.

The Vitalzentrum with the Institute for tinnitus research and treatment. The Vitasol thermal bath is housed under one roof several salt baths with up to 38 °C thermal water from a depth of 1,018 m, and widely integrated into the landscape are a sauna park, health club, beauty and wellness center, a health restaurant, sports and exercise therapy, children's club.

The former bathhouses are still partly preserved, but they are used for other purposes. The "inhalator" is a medical forum, the former "Bath House I" was the private clinic Salinenpark and the former "Leopoldbad" restaurant.

== Monuments ==
Monument to the saltworkers – The monument at the salt yard represents a salt boiler around 800 BC. It was designed and executed by the sculptor Marianne Herford Bleeke – Ehret and installed in May 1988. Salzuflen Tree of Life is a sculpture in bronze and granite stands in front of the new City Hall on the Rudolph Brandes Ave. It was created by Axel Seyler ( University of East Westphalia -Lippe, Detmold campus ) and erected on 8 September 1984. Rudolph Brandes Obelisk is in honor of the pharmacist Rudolph Brandes (1795–1842) and stands on a small lawn area at the confluence of the Riestestraße and Rudolph Brandes Avenue since 1979. Monument to Eduard Hoffmann, son of the founder of Hoffmann 's starch factories, dedicated in 1900 to commemorate the 50th anniversary of the factory of the workforce. The monument stands at the Hoffman Road, between the cemetery and the former fire station. Just across the street was once the main entrance to the factory. Monument to the gallows dispute The monument stands between Salzuflen and Schotmar at the former city limits, at the intersection Rudolph-Brandes-Allee/Walhallastraße Salzuflen. The Council of Schotmar had asked the Council Salzuflen to be able to use the gallows. This request and the response is written on the relief. On the left, two councilors and the crest are shown, the right Kilianskirche and laughing children, in the midst of sinners under the gallows. The gallows dispute is the subject of the 50-pfennig Notgeldscheines.

== Notable buildings ==
The historic City Hall, on located at Am Markt. By Easter 1530 it was already in use (recent studies mention 1545–1547) and was built for the needs of both management and the council. It has been a Tavern, wedding, dance and guild house, court room, party room and records chamber, fire equipment room and ammunition room for shooters and linen storage rooms for grain tithe. About the architect of the house there has been no information, though it was built in the Renaissance style with narrow gable front gable. The three heraldic stones on the facade (city coat of arms, rose and star) were inserted later there. Similarly, the staircase at the front, which was grown in 1853 to plans by the Saline Director Gödecke.

== Memorials ==
=== Memorial "Old Synagogue" in the Mauerstraße ===
In the pogrom of 9 to 10 November 1938 the Salzuflen synagogue was descrated and destroyed after 83 years of being the house of prayer of the local Jewish community. The attempt of arson was prevented by the duty Polizei Obermeister. Police managed to save scriptures and sacred objects from destruction. The remains of the synagogue were, on 12 November 1938, cleared by the local branch of Technical Emergency in Bad Salzuflen. On 9 November 1982 a plaque was attached to a wall adjacent to the site of the synagogue following a proposal from the local chapter of DKP Bad Salzuflen . The text reads "Here stood the synagogue / of the Israelites / town of Bad Salzuflen / was on 9 November 1938 / destroyed by the Nazis / Exodus 3.5 ". In 1998 the current memorial 1998 was built on the site of the synagogue, designed by architect Paul Meier Dahl.

=== Memorial "Jewish Cemetery" at the Werler Straße ===
The Jewish cemetery is closed today, but was most probably created around 1543–1603. It was destroyed in the time of Nazi rule. The remaining grave stones were re-erected after the war. In 1988, the city had acquired the remainder of the area under private ownership, the building demolished and designed the new cemetery. On the monument in the form of a seven-branched candelabrum (menorah) 50 names were inscribed. In 2009, were added another 14 names. On the stone is engraved with the following text:

A reminder to the Jewish victims of Salzuflen and Schötmar that the suffering and injury to you under the National Socialist dictatorship between 1933 and 1945 were wrong and should not be forgot.

and in Hebrew

ת. נ. צ. ב. ה (T.N.Z.W.H.)

Te’hi Nischmató zrurá Bi’zrór Ha’Chajim meaning (May his soul be bound in league of (eternal) life)

=== Stolpersteine ===
Since November 2010, the artist Gunter Demnig has been laying Stolpersteine, or stumbling blocks. The Stolpersteine are a memorial detailing the Jewish victims of the Nazi's on the pavement outside the last known home of that person.

=== War memorials ===
War memorials are found in various cemeteries dedicated to the victims of war. On the sports field in Ehrsen-Breden is a memorial stone, at the cemetery in Biemsen-Ahmsen. In Wüsten, Retzen, Wülfer-Bexten and in the park in Schotmar are cenotaphs. The war memorial in Bad Salzuflen is above the upper mountain cemetery in the woods. It was designed by Hermann Hosaeus and built in 1923. Memorial Day commemorative events are held in all these places every year.

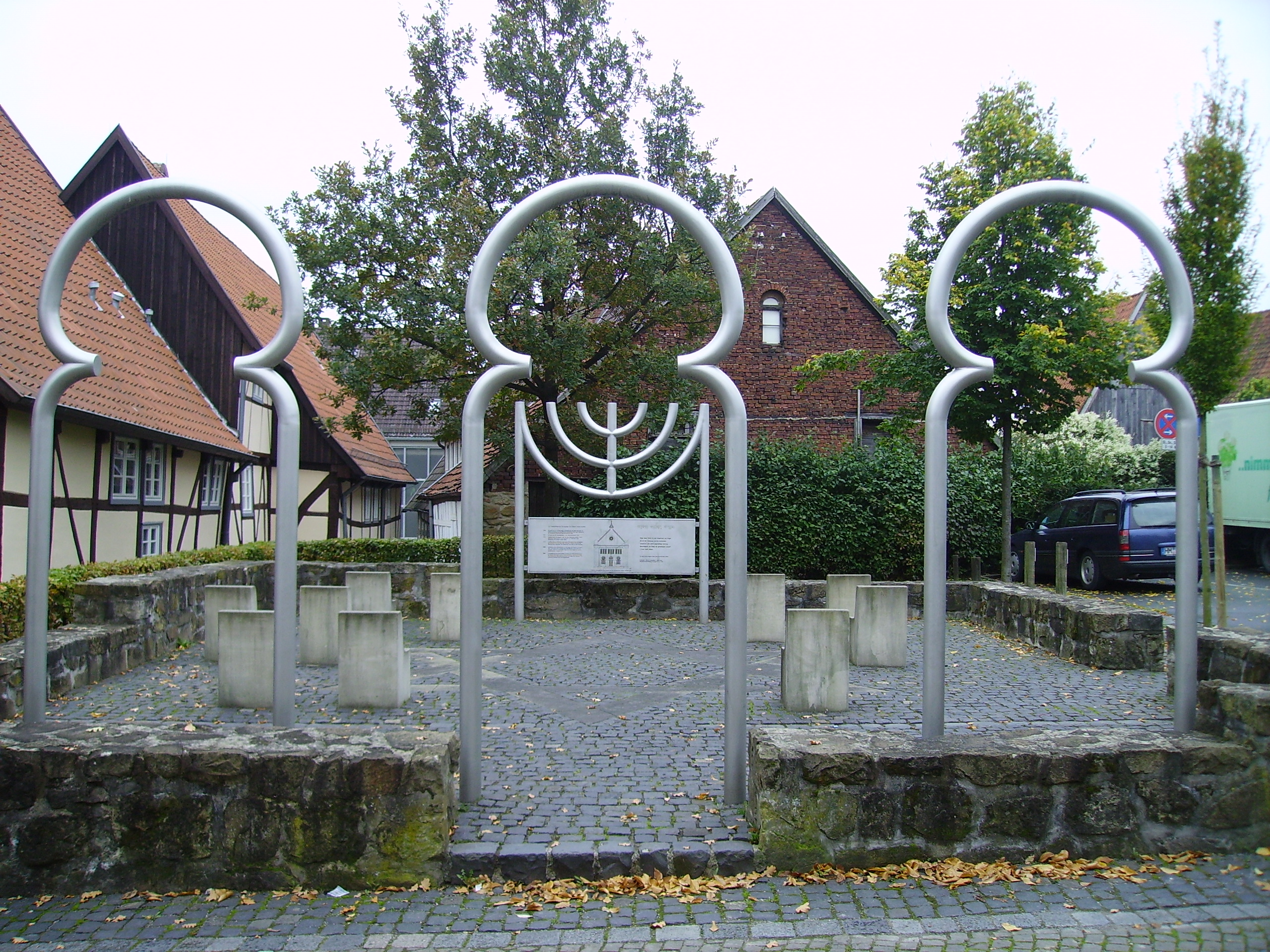
Mahnmal
„Alte Synagoge“ Mauerstraße - Old Synagogue

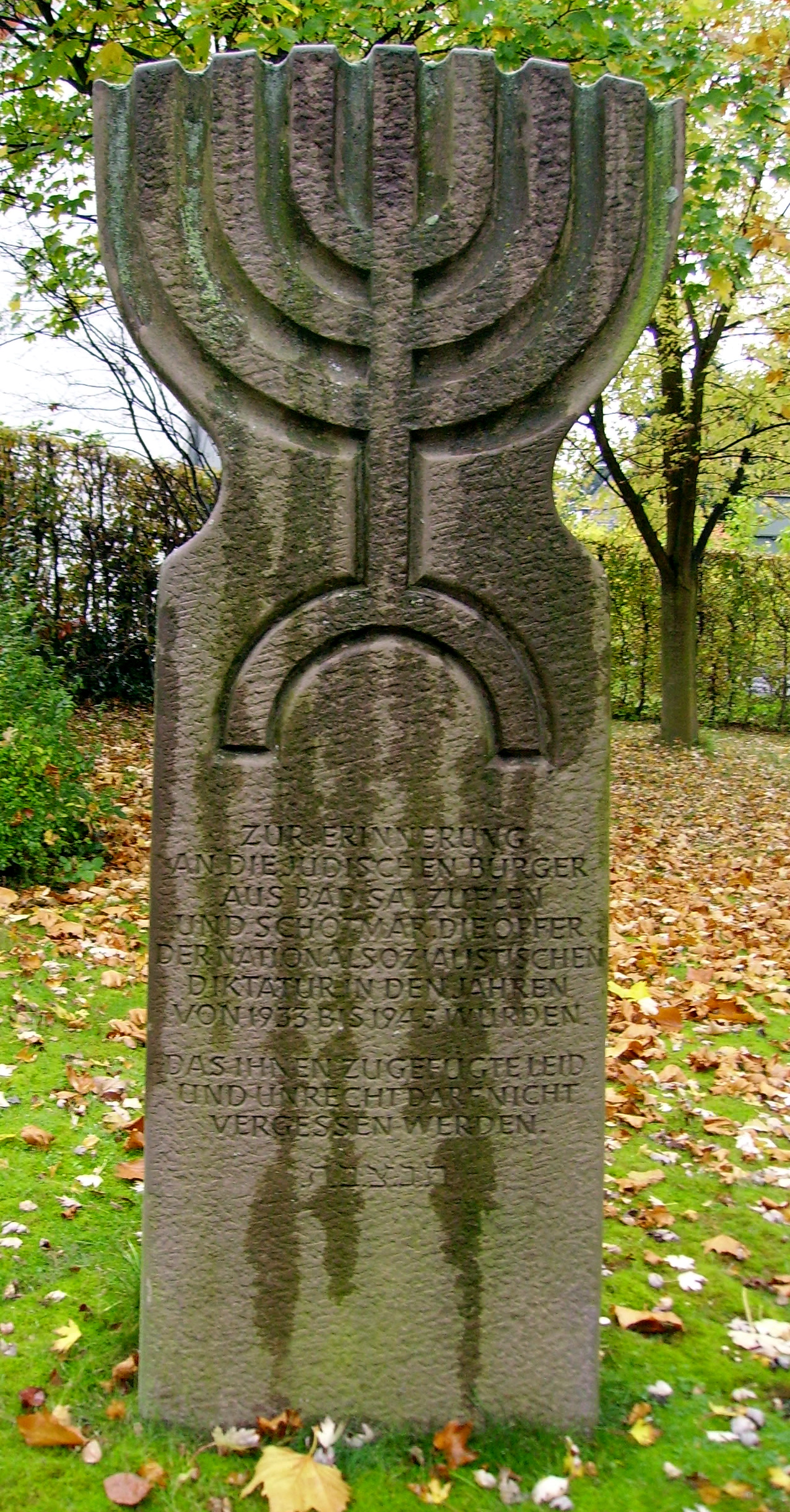
Mahnmal
Jüdischer Friedhof
Werler Straße - Jewish Cemetery

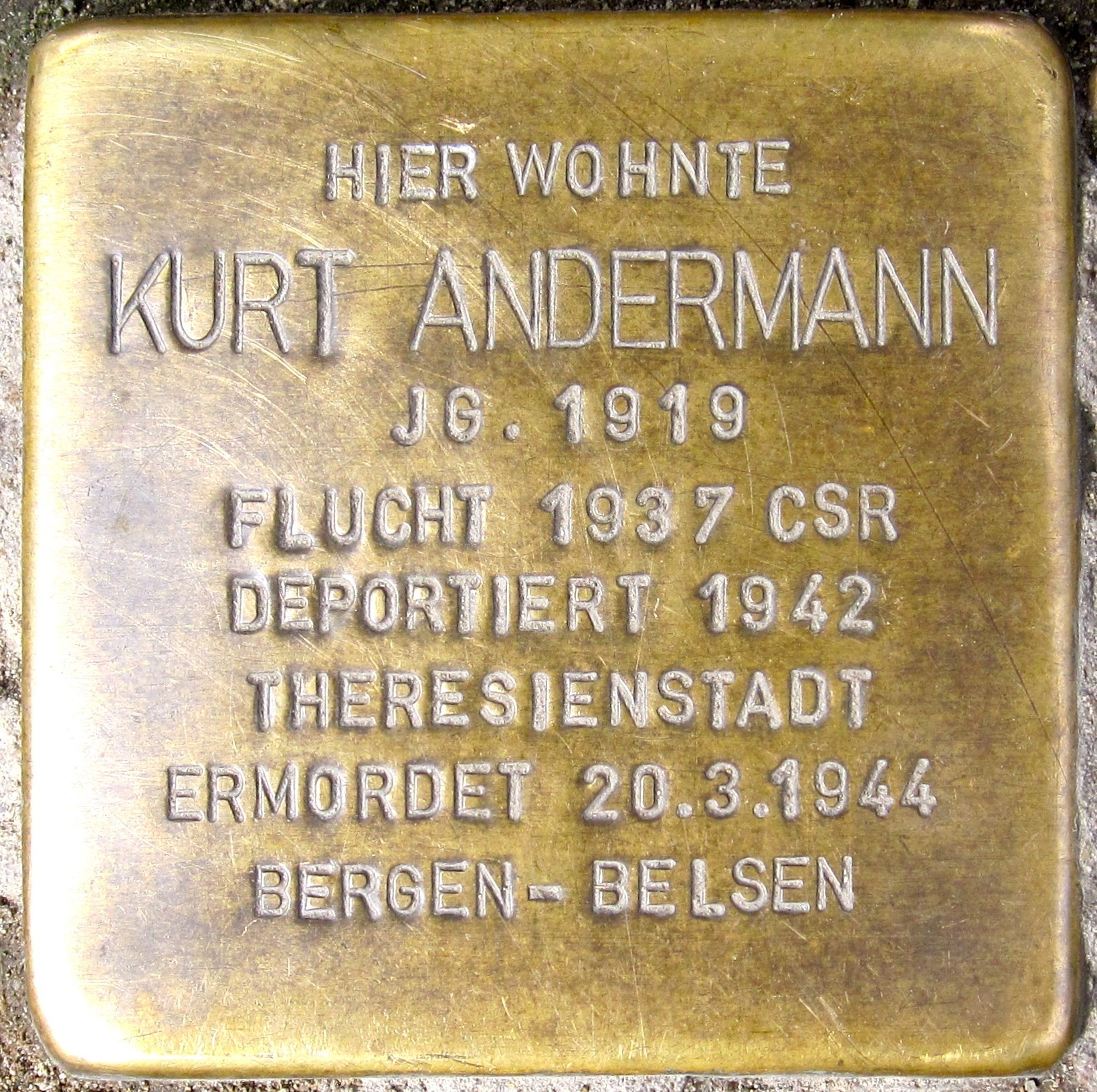
Stolperstein Am Markt 22

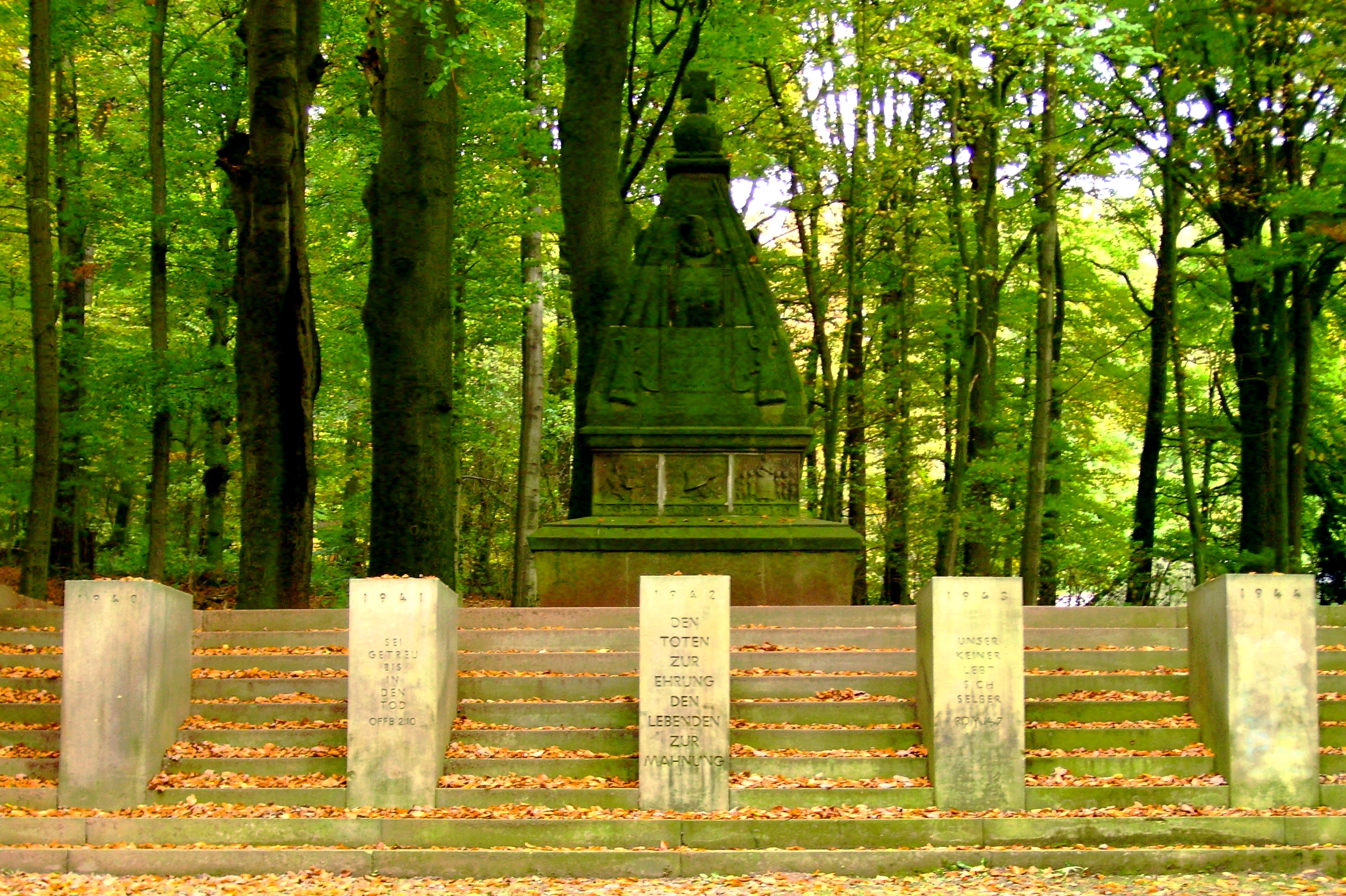
Kriegerehrenmal
am Obernberg - War Memorial

== Twin towns – sister cities ==
Bad Salzuflen is twinned with:

- Luckenwalde, Germany (1990)
- Millau, France (1975)

== Notable people ==
The following personalities were born in Bad Salzuflen or are connected to the city

- Johann Schröder (1600–1664), physician and pharmacist
- Heinrich Hasse (1791–1868), medical officer and city physician in Bad Salzuflen and initiator of the bathing establishment
- Rudolph Brandes (born 1795), founder of Pharmacists Association (today's German Pharmacists Association) and namesake of Rudolph Brandes High School in the school center Lohfeld
- Korl Biegemann (born 1854), doctor and Lippe Dialektliteratur
- Friedrich Frisius (1895–1970), vice admiral
- Hans Leo Kornberg (1928–2019), biochemist and professor at Boston University
- Ingrid Hartmann (1930–2006), canoeist
- Muhammad Salim Abdullah (born 1931), journalist and Senior Director of the Central Institute Islam Archive Germany
- Horst Steinmann (born 1934), economist and emeritus professor of business administration and management
- Arnold Schönhage (born 1934), mathematicians, computer scientists, and Professor Emeritus at the University of Bonn
- Hildegard Ochse (1935–1997), photographer
- Jürgen von der Lippe (born 1948), TV presenter and comedian
- Michael Diekmann (born 1954), German manager
- Ute Frevert (born 1954), historian
- Peter Klein (born 1959), athlete
- Bettina Herlitzius (born 1960), politician (Alliance 90/The Greens)
- Jörg Sasse (born 1962), photographer
- Bernd Begemann (born 1962), musician, connected to the music movement Hamburger Schule
- Thomas Helmer (born 1965), former German footballer
- Frank Spilker (born 1966), musician (Die Sterne)
- Bernadette La Hengst (born 1967), musician (Die Braut haut ins Auge)
- Andreas Schmidt (born 1978), scientist and entrepreneur, founder of AYOXXA Biosystems and Proteona
- Wiebke Muhsal (born 1986), politician (Alternative for Germany)

== See also ==
- List of spa towns in Germany
