= Udo Hemmelgarn =

German politician

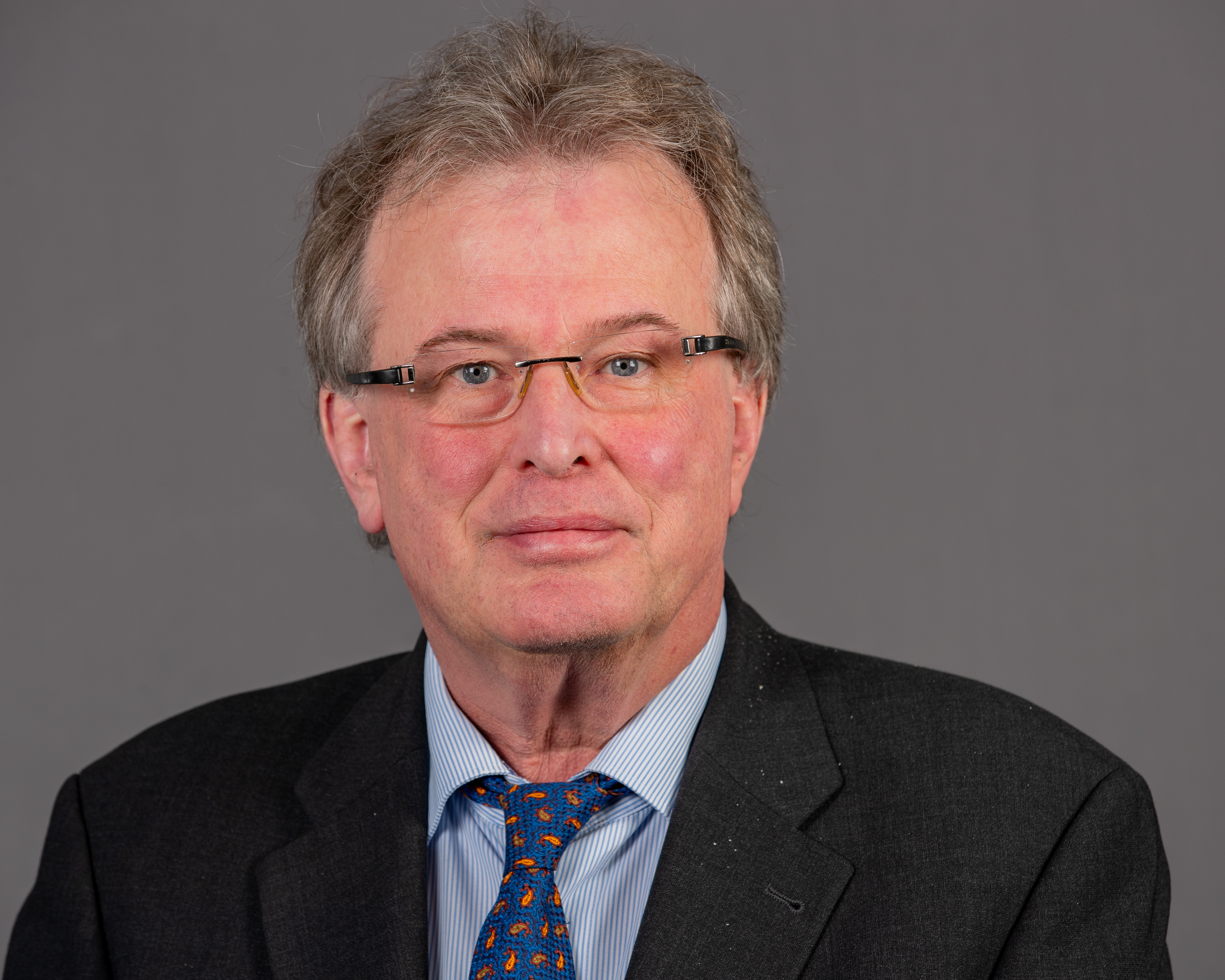

Personal details
- Born: 4 May 1959 (age 67) Harsewinkel, North Rhine-Westphalia, West Germany
- Party: AfD (2013-present)

Udo Hemmelgarn (born 4 May 1959) is a German politician for the party Alternative for Germany (AfD) and a member of the Bundestag from 2017 to 2021.

== Life and politics ==
Hemmelgarn was born 1959 in the West German town of Harsewinkel and worked as self-reliant merchandiser. He entered the newly founded AfD in 2013 and became a member of the Bundestag, the primary law-making body, after the 2017 German federal election.

== Positions and Controversies ==
Hemmelgarn denies the scientific consensus on climate change.

Hemmelgarn was alleged to be part of the far right-wing Reichsbürgerbewegung, but he contested the allegations.

In 2019, Hemmelgarn organized a secret travel of four AfD members of Bundestag to Syria. He was a strong supporter of a "new Syria policy" in the Bundestag. For AfD that meant a backing of the Assad regime and German government support for Russian involvement in the region.

In 2020, Hemmelgarn was one of several AfD delegates implicated in bringing guests into the Reichstag building who then proceeded to intimidate members of the government and other delegates.
