= Christian Sauter (politician) =

German politician

Member of the Bundestag
- In office 2017–2025

Personal details
- Born: 11 February 1980 (age 46) Rinteln, West Germany (now Germany)
- Party: FDP

Christian Sauter (born 11 February 1980) is a German politician of the Free Democratic Party (FDP) who served as a member of the Bundestag from the state of North Rhine-Westphalia from 2017 to 2025.

== Early life and education ==
Sauter was born in Rinteln in 1980 and grew up in the Extertal, where he still lives today. After passing his Abitur (A-levels) at the Gymnasium Barntrup and completing his military service, he completed his studies in 2006 as a graduate industrial engineer (FH) in the field of logistics and subsequently became active in this field. He is an active member of the Association of German Armed Forces Reservists.

== Political career ==
Sauter became a member of the Bundestag after the 2017 German federal election. In parliament, he served a member of the Defence Committee.

In February 2024, Sauter announced that he would not stand in the 2025 federal elections.
