= Kerstin Vieregge =

German politician

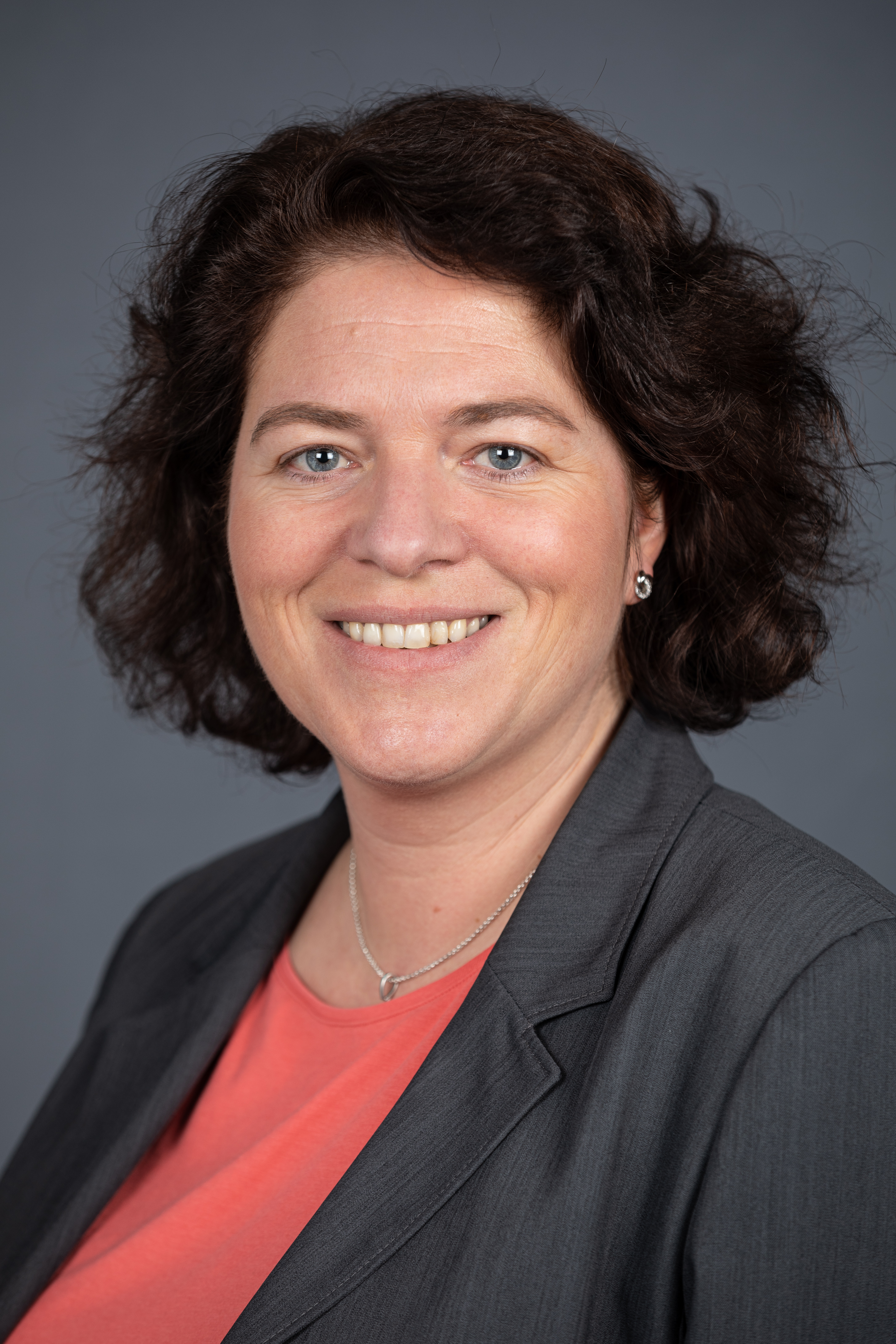
- Kerstin Vieregge in 2020

Member of the Bundestag
- Incumbent
- Assumed office 24 October 2017

Personal details
- Born: 6 September 1979 (age 46) Rinteln, West Germany (now Germany)
- Party: CDU

Kerstin Vieregge (born 6 September 1979) is a German politician. Born in Rinteln, Lower Saxony, she represents the CDU. Kerstin Vieregge has served as a member of the Bundestag from the state of North Rhine-Westphalia since 2017.

== Political career ==
Vieregge became a member of the Bundestag after the 2017 German federal election. She is a member of the Defence Committee and the Tourism Committee. Since 2022, she has also been part of the German delegation to the Parliamentary Assembly of the Organization for Security and Co-operation in Europe.
