= Wilthen =

- Town
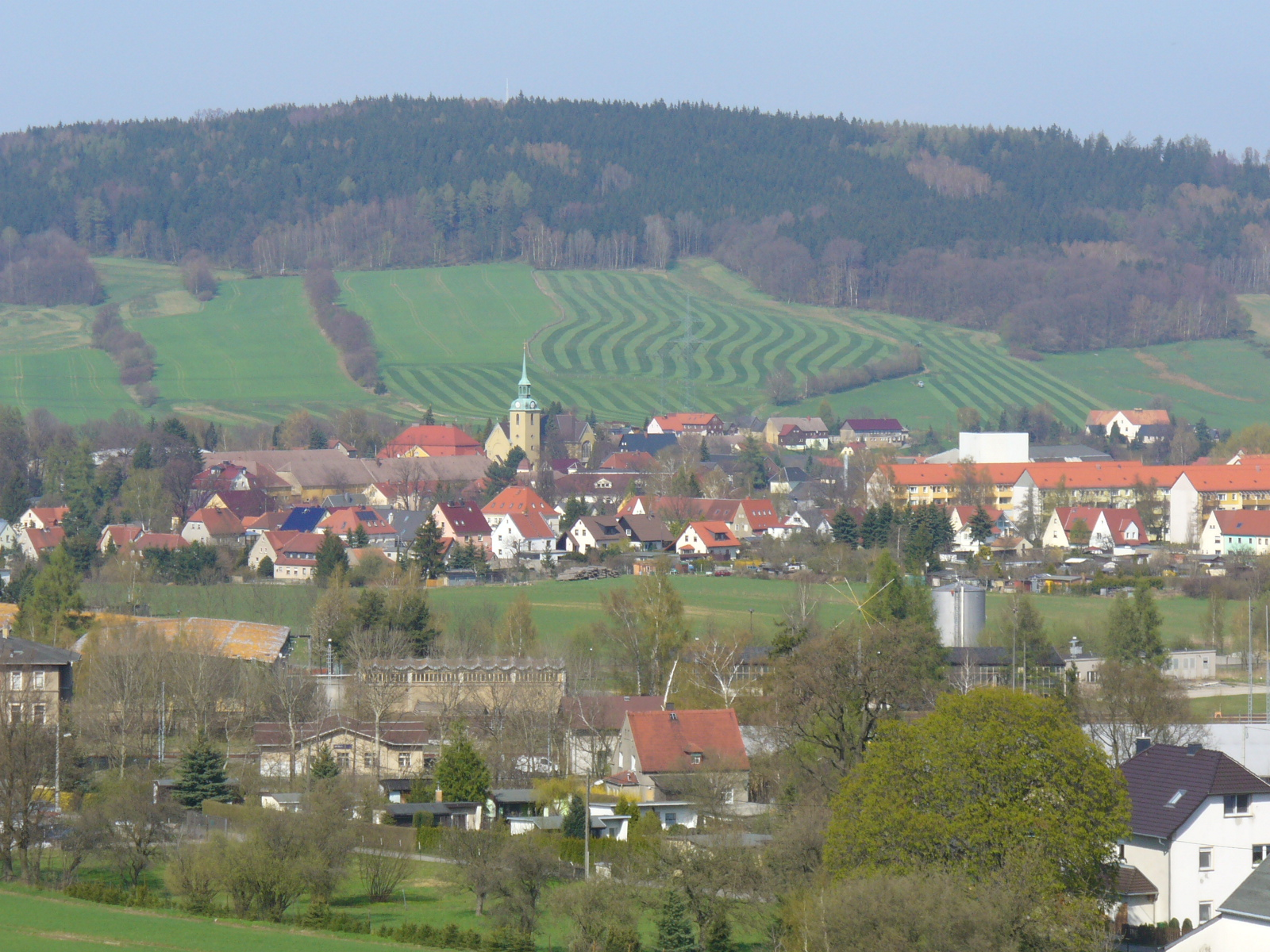

- Coat of arms

- Location of Wilthen within Bautzen district
- Interactive map of Wilthen
- Location within Germany Location within Saxony
- Coordinates: 51°6′N 14°24′E
- Country: Germany
- State: Saxony
- District: Bautzen
- Subdivisions: 3

Government
  - Mayor (2022–29): Michael Herfort (CDU)

Area
  - Total: 17.04 km^{2} (6.58 sq mi)
- Elevation: 288 m (945 ft)

Population (2025-12-31)
  - Total: 4,596
  - Density: 269.7/km^{2} (698.6/sq mi)
- Time zone: UTC+01:00 (CET)
  - Summer (DST): UTC+02:00 (CEST)
- Postal codes: 02679–02681
- Dialling codes: 03592
- Vehicle registration: BZ, BIW, HY, KM
- Website: Official website

Wilthen (German pronunciation: [ˈvɪltn̩]; Upper Sorbian: Wjelećin, pronounced [ˈwʲɛlɛtʃin]) is a town in the district of Bautzen, in Saxony, Germany. It is near the border with the Czech Republic, 9 kilometres (5.6 mi) south of Bautzen and 50 kilometres (31 mi) east of Dresden.

== Geography ==
Nearby communities are Obergurig/Hornja Hórka, Großpostwitz/Budestecy, Kirschau, Schirgiswalde, and Steinigtwolmsdorf. Wilthen today consists of a central settlement and some smaller villages. The parts of the community are named Sora, Ingersdorf and Tautewalde. The place is well known in Germany because of its biggest employer, an alcohol-producing company.

== History ==
Wilthen arose out of an old Sorbian village that was mentioned first in 1222. In 1669 the village received the status of a town and marketplace. It still was regarded to as a village because only a few markets are located there each year. Three hundred years later, it became a town again. Since 1972, Wilthen has been an official place of recovery (Erholungsort).

== Mayors ==
- Horst Hönig: 1974–1987
- Gabriele Parakeninks: 1988–1990
- Bernd Wucke: May 1990–January 1991
- Manfred Melior (CDU): Januar 1991–August 1991
- Knut Vetter (FDP): 1991–2008
- Michael Herfort (CDU): since August 2008

== Culture, sights and tourism ==
The town is situated in the "Lausitzer Bergland", a hillregion between Saxon Switzerland and the Zittauer Gebirge in the Lusatian Mountains. Wilthen offers many possibilities of touring like many look outs upon the hilltops and nearby restaurants. Another touring-route leads through the small pond-district. Some remains of the old rural culture and weaving tradition of the region can be found in a small camber of home "Heimatstube". With a group of more than ten people it is also possible to get into the distillery "Wilthener Weinbrennerei", founded in 1843 and since 1992 owned by the company Hardenberg-Wilthen. Few of the old houses of the town has been preserved like some old craftsmen-houses.

== Economy ==
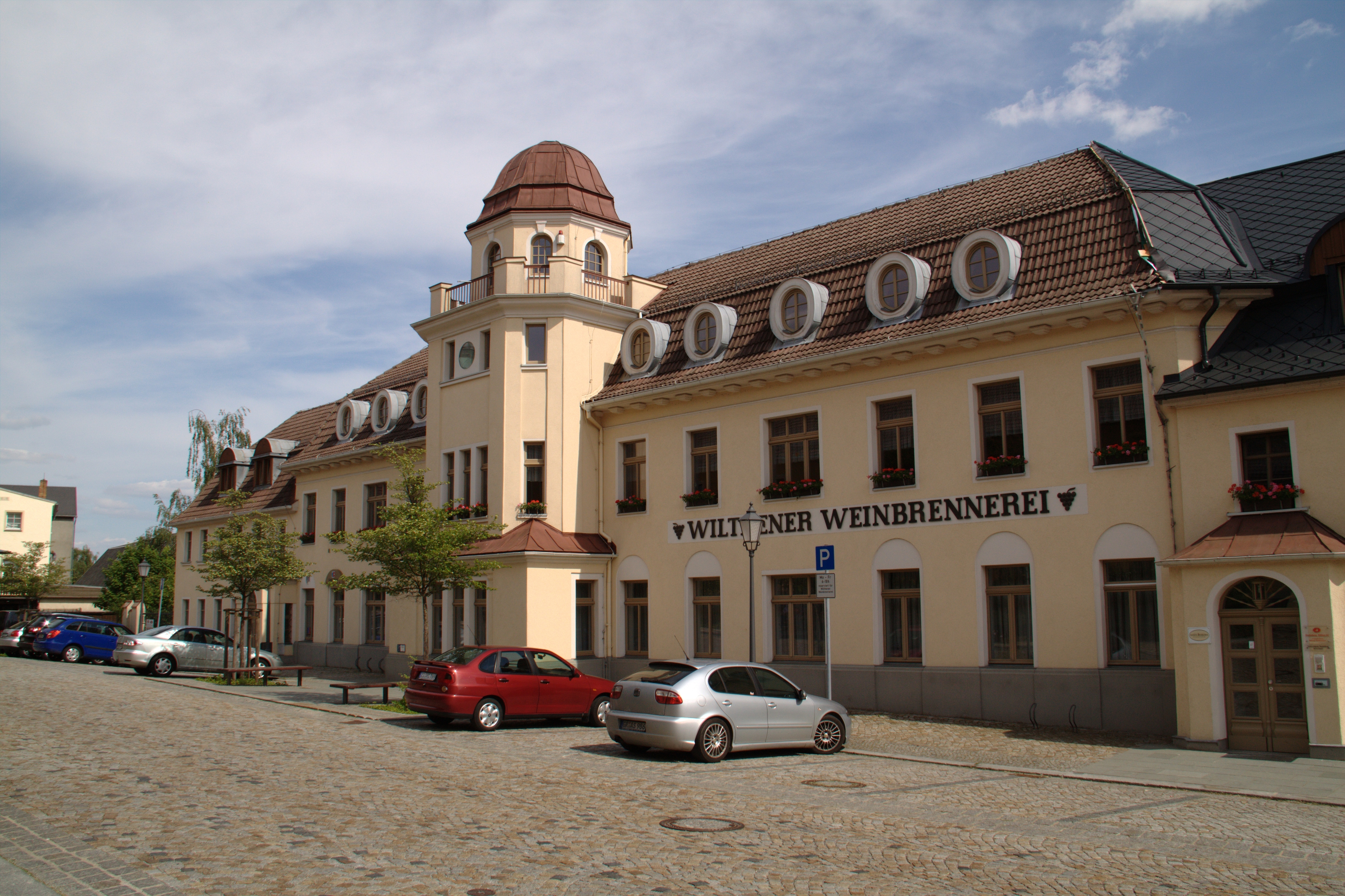
Wilthen distillery

At the beginning of the 19th century the town started to become a well known place of textile industry, machine building, plastic production and alcohol production. Important enterprises today are: The distillery Wilthener Weinbrennerei (Hardenberg-Wilthen AG), KEW Kunststofferzeugnisse GmbH Wilthen, Lakowa GmbH Kunststoffbe- und verarbeitung, VTN Härterei Wilthen GmbH, SLM GmbH and Schumann Kies- und Hartsteinwerke.
