= Wolfgang Vogt =

German politician (1929–2006)

- Wolfgang Vogt as Parliamentary State Secretary

Member of the Bundestag
- In office 20 October 1969 – 26 October 1998
- Constituency: Düren (1972–1994); North Rhine-Westphalia (1969–1972, 1994–1998)

Parliamentary State Secretary at the Federal Ministry of Labour and Social Affairs
- In office October 1982 – 24 January 1991

Mayor of Düren
- In office 9 May 1972 – 13 December 1983

Personal details
- Born: 1 December 1929 Schirgiswalde, Free State of Saxony, Weimar Republic
- Died: 12 December 2006 (aged 77) Düren, North Rhine-Westphalia, Germany
- Party: Christian Democratic Union
- Education: University of Cologne
- Occupation: Economist, journalist, politician

Wolfgang Vogt (1 December 1929 – 12 December 2006) was a German economist, journalist and politician of the Christian Democratic Union (CDU). He was a member of the Bundestag from 1969 to 1998, representing the Düren constituency by direct mandate from 1972 to 1994 and North Rhine-Westphalia via the state list in his other terms. He was mayor of Düren from 1972 to 1983 and Parliamentary State Secretary at the Federal Ministry of Labour and Social Affairs under Norbert Blüm from 1982 to 1991. From 1975 to 1995, he chaired the Christian Democratic Employees' Association (CDA) at state level in North Rhine-Westphalia.

== Early life and education ==
Vogt was born in Schirgiswalde in the Bautzen district of Saxony. He joined the CDU in the Soviet occupation zone and, after completing his Abitur in 1949, worked for the party in Bautzen until he fled to West Berlin in 1950. He studied economics and social sciences at the University of Cologne, graduating as a Diplom-Volkswirt in 1956, and worked as a research assistant at the university's sociology seminar until 1959.

== Early career ==
Vogt was an education officer for the Katholische Arbeitnehmer-Bewegung (KAB), the Catholic workers' movement, and a lecturer at the Katholisch-Soziales Institut in Bad Honnef. In 1959 he became editor-in-chief of the Ketteler-Wacht, the KAB's weekly newspaper. He belonged to the trade union IG Bau-Steine-Erden and was vice-president of the Arbeitsgemeinschaft der Verbraucherverbände (AgV), the umbrella organisation of West German consumer associations. He moved to Düren in 1970.

== Political career ==
=== Local politics ===
After the death of Oberbürgermeister Heinz Kotthaus in March 1972, Vogt was elected to the Düren town council on 23 April 1972 and chosen as Oberbürgermeister on 9 May. He was re-elected in 1975 and 1979. During his tenure, the title of the office was changed to Bürgermeister, after a 1975 decree by the state interior minister restricted the title Oberbürgermeister to independent cities; the town amended its charter in 1977. Vogt resigned as mayor on 13 December 1983 and was succeeded by Hans Becker. He was again a member of the town council from 1984 to 1989.

=== Member of the Bundestag ===
Vogt was elected to the Bundestag in the 1969 federal election on the CDU's North Rhine-Westphalia state list and won the Düren constituency directly from 1972 to 1990. Before the 1994 election, he faced a rival candidate within the party; Thomas Rachel won the Düren seat for the CDU, and Vogt returned via the state list. He left the Bundestag in 1998 after eight terms.

In May 1971 he asked the Brandt government in question time whether the price target in its annual economic report could be met, and about a forecast of the cost-of-living index by the consumer associations. His main field was social policy. In 1982 he opposed cuts to housing benefit proposed by Gerhard Stoltenberg, arguing that housing benefit could not be reduced if the party accepted rising rents to encourage housebuilding. He chaired the employees' group (Arbeitnehmergruppe) of the CDU/CSU parliamentary group. In August 1996 he proposed a tiered value-added tax, with a rate of 20 per cent on luxury goods, a general rate of 17 per cent, and 7 per cent on food and cultural goods.

In his last term, he was a member of the Committee on Labour and Social Affairs, the Committee on Economic Cooperation and Development, and the Mediation Committee, and a deputy member of the Health Committee.

=== Parliamentary State Secretary ===
Vogt was Parliamentary State Secretary at the Federal Ministry of Labour and Social Affairs under Minister Norbert Blüm in the government of Chancellor Helmut Kohl from October 1982 to 24 January 1991. He left office when a new cabinet was formed after the 1990 German federal election. In November 1982 he said that a supplementary income tax, which the trade unions and the Social Democrats had demanded, was politically spent for the new coalition; the coalition introduced a repayable compulsory loan, the investment aid levy, instead. He remained mayor of Düren until December 1983.

In 1984 Vogt was one of twenty serving and three former members of the Bundestag investigated by tax investigators and prosecutors on suspicion of aiding tax evasion in connection with donations to political parties, as part of the party donations affair. The proceedings against him were discontinued in 1988 for lack of sufficient suspicion.

=== Christian Democratic Employees' Association (CDA) ===
From 1975, Vogt chaired the CDA's Rhineland association and, after its merger with the Westphalian association, the CDA in North Rhine-Westphalia, until 1995. He was a member of the CDA's state executive, first in the Rhineland and later in North Rhine-Westphalia.

After the CDU's defeat in the 1980 state election, he rejected the view of the CSU leader and chancellor candidate Franz Josef Strauß that the state party's campaign had caused the loss. In 1981, as treasurer of the CDU under Blüm, he supported a Bundestag resolution calling on the government to secure codetermination in the coal and steel industry. In 1985, during the debate on merging the Rhineland and Westphalian CDU associations, he opposed Kurt Biedenkopf.

By 1987 Vogt was a deputy federal chairman of the CDA. When Blüm stepped down as federal chairman that year, Vogt did not stand for the post, as his government office bound him to cabinet discipline; Heinz Soenius was chosen instead.

In January 1993, during the negotiations on the Solidarity Pact to finance reconstruction in eastern Germany, he published a position paper opposing further cuts in social benefits. He argued that the share of national income going to employees had fallen from 76.9 to 70.8 per cent between 1982 and 1991, and that a proposed three per cent cut in social assistance would be unconstitutional. He proposed reducing contributions to the Federal Labour Office (now the Federal Employment Agency) by two percentage points, financed by a temporary surcharge on income and corporation tax.

He helped establish the Stiftung Christlich-Soziale Politik and its conference centre, the Arbeitnehmer-Zentrum Königswinter, which opened in Königswinter in 1986. The CDA in North Rhine-Westphalia later made him its honorary chairman.

== Personal life and death ==
Vogt was a Catholic, was married and had two children. He died in Düren on 12 December 2006, aged 77, after a long illness. His memoirs, Bohrer und Brett, edited by Karl-Albert Eßer, were published in 2007.

== Honours ==
- Commander's Cross of the Order of Merit of the Federal Republic of Germany
- Heinrich Brauns Prize of the Diocese of Essen (1998)
- Ring of Honour of the town of Düren (2004)

== Selected works ==
- Vogt, Wolfgang (1965). Der Staat in der Soziallehre der Kirche. Bibliothek Ekklesia (in German). Vol. 24. Aschaffenburg: Pattloch.
- Vogt, Wolfgang (2006). "Geschichte wiederholt sich nicht, Geschichten schon – Ein Querdenker erinnert sich". Soziale Ordnung (in German). 59 (4): 60.
- Vogt, Wolfgang (2007). Eßer, Karl-Albert (ed.). Bohrer und Brett: Erinnern und Reflektieren (in German). Merzenich: Porschen & Bergsch.
