= Düren (electoral district) =

Federal electoral district of Germany

89 Düren
- Electoral district for the Bundestag
- Düren in 2025
- State: North Rhine-Westphalia
- Population: 264,600 (2019)
- Electorate: 199,656 (2021)
- Major settlements: Düren; Jülich
- Area: 941.5 km^{2}

Current electoral district
- Created: 1949
- Party: CDU
- Member: Thomas Rachel
- Elected: 2005, 2009, 2013, 2017, 2021, 2025

Düren is an electoral constituency (German: Wahlkreis) represented in the Bundestag. It elects one member via first-past-the-post voting. Under the current constituency numbering system, it is designated as constituency 89. It is located in western North Rhine-Westphalia, comprising the Düren district.

Düren was created for the inaugural 1949 federal election. Since 2005, it has been represented by Thomas Rachel of the Christian Democratic Union (CDU).

== Geography ==
Düren is located in western North Rhine-Westphalia. As of the 2021 federal election, it is coterminous with the Düren district.

== History ==
Düren was created in 1949, then known as Düren – Monschau – Schleiden. It acquired its current name in the 1965 election. In the 1949 election, it was North Rhine-Westphalia constituency 4 in the numbering system. In the 1953 through 1961 elections, it was number 63. From 1965 through 1998, it was number 56. From 2002 through 2009, it was number 91. In the 2013 through 2021 elections, it was number 90. From the 2025 election, it has been number 89.

Originally, the constituency comprised the districts of Düren, Monschau, and Schleiden. In the 1972 election, it was coterminous with Düren district. In the 1976 election, it also contained the municipalities of Bedburg and Elsdorf from the Erftkreis district. It acquired its current borders in the 1980 election.

Election	No.	Name	Borders
1949	4	Düren – Monschau – Schleiden	Düren district; Monschau district; Schleiden district
1953	63	Düren – Monschau – Schleiden	Düren district; Monschau district; Schleiden district
1957	63	Düren – Monschau – Schleiden	Düren district; Monschau district; Schleiden district
1961	63	Düren – Monschau – Schleiden	Düren district; Monschau district; Schleiden district
1965	56	Düren	Düren district; Monschau district; Schleiden district
1969	56	Düren	Düren district; Monschau district; Schleiden district
1972	56	Düren	Düren district
1976	56	Düren	Düren district; Erftkreis district (only Bedburg and Elsdorf municipalities)
1980	56	Düren	Düren district
1983	56	Düren	Düren district
1987	56	Düren	Düren district
1990	56	Düren	Düren district
1994	56	Düren	Düren district
1998	56	Düren	Düren district
2002	91	Düren	Düren district
2005	91	Düren	Düren district
2009	91	Düren	Düren district
2013	90	Düren	Düren district
2017	90	Düren	Düren district
2021	90	Düren	Düren district
2025	89	Düren	Düren district

== Members ==
The constituency has been held by the Christian Democratic Union (CDU) during all but two Bundestag terms since its creation. It was first represented by Bernhard Günther from 1949 to 1965, followed by Bert Even and Herbert Hermesdorf, each for a single term. Wolfgang Vogt was elected in 1972 and served until 1994. Thomas Rachel was elected in the 1994 election but defeated in 1998, when Dietmar Nietan of the Social Democratic Party (SPD) won the constituency. In 2005, Rachel regained it for the CDU. He was re-elected in 2009, 2013, 2017, 2021 and 2025.

Election	Member	Party	%
1949	Bernhard Günther	CDU	61.5
1953	Bernhard Günther	CDU	69.3
1957	Bernhard Günther	CDU	73.0
1961	Bernhard Günther	CDU	66.6
1965	Bert Even	CDU	64.7
1969	Herbert Hermesdorf	CDU	60.0
1972	Wolfgang Vogt	CDU	51.2
1976	Wolfgang Vogt	CDU	52.8
1980	Wolfgang Vogt	CDU	50.1
1983	Wolfgang Vogt	CDU	54.6
1987	Wolfgang Vogt	CDU	49.2
1990	Wolfgang Vogt	CDU	44.8
1994	Thomas Rachel	CDU	46.2
1998	Dietmar Nietan	SPD	47.1
2002	Dietmar Nietan	SPD	45.5
2005	Thomas Rachel	CDU	45.0
2009	Thomas Rachel	CDU	46.4
2013	Thomas Rachel	CDU	50.4
2017	Thomas Rachel	CDU	41.9
2021	Thomas Rachel	CDU	36.7
2025	Thomas Rachel	CDU	39.9

== Election results ==
=== 2025 election ===
Federal election (2025): Düren
Notes:	Blue background denotes the winner of the electorate vote. Pink background denotes a candidate elected from their party list. Yellow background denotes an electorate win by a list member, or other incumbent. A ✓ or ✗ denotes status of any incumbent, win or lose respectively.						
Party	Candidate	Votes	%	±%	Party votes	%	±%
CDU	✓ Thomas Rachel	64,996	39.9	▲3.2	54,483	33.3	▲3.0
SPD	Walter Daniel	35,854	22.0	▼8.8	30,306	18.5	▼10.4
AfD	Nadine Heuser	33,137	20.3	▲11.8	33,517	20.5	▲11.9
Greens	Katya Bäcker	12,153	7.5	▼1.9	13,843	8.5	▼2.7
Left	Valentin Veithen	9,105	5.6	▲3.3	10,498	6.4	▲3.4
BSW					6,931	4.2	
FDP	Philipp Klose	4,591	2.8	▼4.6	7,006	4.3	▼7.0
FW	Tanja Lenzen-Brückmann	3,264	2.0	▲0.6	1,178	0.7	▼0.1
Tierschutzpartei					2,549	1.6	▼0.1
Volt					916	0.6	▲0.2
PARTEI				▼1.5	835	0.5	▼0.4
dieBasis				▼1.0	395	0.2	▼0.8
PdF					323	0.2	▲0.2
Team Todenhöfer					249	0.2	▼0.3
BD					208	0.1	
Values					107	0.1	
MERA25					44	0.0	
MLPD					31	0.0	0.0
Pirates				▼0.8			▼0.5
Gesundheitsforschung							▼0.1
Bündnis C							▼0.1
ÖDP							▼0.1
Humanists							▼0.1
SGP							0.0
Informal votes		1,449			1,130		
Total valid votes		163,100			163,419		
Turnout		164,549	82.6	▲5.6			
CDU hold	Majority	29,142	17.9				

=== 2021 election ===
Federal election (2021): Düren
Notes:	Blue background denotes the winner of the electorate vote. Pink background denotes a candidate elected from their party list. Yellow background denotes an electorate win by a list member, or other incumbent. A ✓ or ✗ denotes status of any incumbent, win or lose respectively.						
Party	Candidate	Votes	%	±%	Party votes	%	±%
CDU	✓ Thomas Rachel	55,719	36.7	▼5.2	46,217	30.4	▼4.5
SPD	Dietmar Nietan	46,734	30.8	▼1.0	44,058	29.0	▼0.2
Greens	Chris Andrä	14,174	9.3	▲3.8	16,951	11.1	▲5.7
AfD	Wolfgang Kochs	12,947	8.5	▼0.4	13,171	8.7	▼1.0
FDP	Laura Jacobsen-Littig	11,237	7.4	▲1.5	17,104	11.2	▼0.2
Left	Valentin Veithen	3,449	2.3	▼2.1	4,570	3.0	▼2.9
Tierschutzpartei					2,465	1.6	▲0.8
PARTEI	Stephan Staß	2,298	1.5		1,387	0.9	▲0.3
FW	Frank Bank	2,196	1.4	▲0.7	1,296	0.9	▲0.5
dieBasis	Werner Hürttlen	1,565	1.0		1,545	1.0	
Pirates	Philipp Eismar	1,146	0.8	▼0.2	730	0.5	0.0
Team Todenhöfer					641	0.4	
Volt					514	0.3	
Unabhängige	Peter Helmer	473	0.3				
LIEBE					260	0.2	
Gesundheitsforschung					222	0.1	0.0
NPD					179	0.1	▼0.2
LfK					166	0.1	
Bündnis C					162	0.1	
du.					90	0.1	
ÖDP					88	0.1	0.0
Humanists					87	0.1	0.0
V-Partei3					83	0.1	0.0
PdF					54	0.0	
LKR					34	0.0	
DKP					32	0.0	0.0
MLPD					12	0.0	0.0
SGP					10	0.0	0.0
Informal votes		1,707			1,516		
Total valid votes		151,938			152,129		
Turnout		153,645	77.0	▲1.0			
CDU hold	Majority	8,985	5.9	▼4.2			

=== 2017 election ===
Federal election (2017): Düren
Notes:	Blue background denotes the winner of the electorate vote. Pink background denotes a candidate elected from their party list. Yellow background denotes an electorate win by a list member, or other incumbent. A ✓ or ✗ denotes status of any incumbent, win or lose respectively.						
Party	Candidate	Votes	%	±%	Party votes	%	±%
CDU	✓ Thomas Rachel	62,711	41.9	▼8.5	52,412	34.9	▼9.4
SPD	Dietmar Nietan	47,543	31.7	▼2.5	43,816	29.2	▼0.5
AfD	Bernd Essler	13,404	8.9		14,432	9.6	▲5.6
FDP	Katharina Kloke	8,788	5.9	▲4.0	17,155	11.4	▲6.5
Greens	Oliver Krischer	8,235	5.5	▲0.6	8,198	5.5	▼0.6
Left	Valentin Veithen	6,611	4.4	▼0.7	8,809	5.9	▲0.5
Tierschutzpartei					1,293	0.9	
PARTEI					844	0.6	▲0.1
Pirates	Gunther Neubert	1,420	0.9	▼2.5	789	0.5	▼1.9
FW	Walter Leo Schreinemacher	1,126	0.8		500	0.3	▲0.1
NPD					411	0.3	▼0.8
AD-DEMOKRATEN					392	0.3	
Volksabstimmung					170	0.1	▼0.1
Gesundheitsforschung					143	0.1	
ÖDP					142	0.1	0.0
DiB					133	0.1	
V-Partei³					129	0.1	
DM					117	0.1	
BGE					112	0.1	
Die Humanisten					69	0.0	
MLPD					32	0.0	0.0
DKP					27	0.0	
SGP					9	0.0	0.0
Informal votes		1,757			1,461		
Total valid votes		149,838			150,134		
Turnout		151,595	75.9	▲3.0			
CDU hold	Majority	15,168	10.2	▼6.0			

=== 2013 election ===
Federal election (2013): Düren
Notes:	Blue background denotes the winner of the electorate vote. Pink background denotes a candidate elected from their party list. Yellow background denotes an electorate win by a list member, or other incumbent. A ✓ or ✗ denotes status of any incumbent, win or lose respectively.						
Party	Candidate	Votes	%	±%	Party votes	%	±%
CDU	✓ Thomas Rachel	71,903	50.4	▲4.0	63,532	44.3	▲6.6
SPD	Dietmar Nietan	48,849	34.2	▲3.4	42,549	29.7	▲4.2
Left	Michael Aggelidis	7,288	5.1	▼2.0	8,120	5.7	▼2.7
Greens	Oliver Krischer	6,951	4.9	▼1.5	8,729	6.1	▼1.7
Pirates	Marcus Friedrich	4,867	3.4		3,478	2.4	▲0.8
FDP	Jörn Langefeld	2,722	1.9	▼5.7	7,102	5.0	▼10.1
AfD					5,732	4.0	
NPD					1,565	1.1	▼0.4
PARTEI					652	0.5	
Volksabstimmung					373	0.3	▲0.1
FW					344	0.2	
PRO					311	0.2	
Nichtwahler					238	0.2	
Independent	Mehmet Babatankuz	196	0.1				
REP					183	0.1	▼0.1
ÖDP					148	0.1	▲0.1
Party of Reason					122	0.1	
RRP					74	0.1	▼0.1
BIG					67	0.0	
Die Rechte					46	0.0	
PSG					40	0.0	0.0
BüSo					35	0.0	0.0
MLPD					31	0.0	0.0
Informal votes		2,765			2,070		
Total valid votes		142,776			143,471		
Turnout		145,541	72.9	▲0.9			
CDU hold	Majority	23,054	16.2	▲0.6			

=== 2009 election ===
Federal election (2009): Düren
Notes:	Blue background denotes the winner of the electorate vote. Pink background denotes a candidate elected from their party list. Yellow background denotes an electorate win by a list member, or other incumbent. A ✓ or ✗ denotes status of any incumbent, win or lose respectively.						
Party	Candidate	Votes	%	±%	Party votes	%	±%
CDU	✓ Thomas Rachel	65,662	46.4	▲1.3	53,597	47.7	▼0.8
SPD	Dietmar Nietan	43,655	30.8	▼12.0	36,209	25.5	▼12.2
FDP	Jörn Langefeld	10,745	7.6	▲3.9	21,383	15.1	▲5.6
Left	Valentin Veithen	10,079	7.1	▲2.8	11,924	8.4	▲2.9
Greens	Oliver Krischer	8,956	6.3	▲3.4	11,102	7.8	▲2.1
Pirates					2,273	1.6	
NPD	Ingo Haller	2,514	1.8	▲0.6	2,066	1.5	▲0.5
Tierschutzpartei					1,100	0.8	▲0.2
FAMILIE					891	0.6	▲0.1
RENTNER					592	0.4	
REP					259	0.2	▼0.1
RRP					207	0.1	
Volksabstimmung					201	0.1	0.0
DVU					74	0.1	
Centre					72	0.1	0.0
ÖDP					62	0.0	
BüSo					28	0.0	▼0.0
MLPD					20	0.0	0.0
PSG					19	0.0	0.0
Informal votes		2,447			1,979		
Total valid votes		141,611			142,079		
Turnout		144,058	72.1	▼5.5			
CDU hold	Majority	22,007	15.6	▲13.4			

=== 2005 election ===
Federal election (2005): Düren
Notes:	Blue background denotes the winner of the electorate vote. Pink background denotes a candidate elected from their party list. Yellow background denotes an electorate win by a list member, or other incumbent. A ✓ or ✗ denotes status of any incumbent, win or lose respectively.						
Party	Candidate	Votes	%	±%	Party votes	%	±%
CDU	Thomas Rachel	68,166	45.0	▲1.7	58,467	38.5	▼1.3
SPD	✗ Dietmar Nietan	52,148	37.3	▲0.4	45,723	32.5	▼3.4
FDP	Helmut Jansen	5,628	3.7	▼9.3	14,298	9.4	▲0.4
Left	Paul Schäfer	6,504	4.3	▲3.4	8,317	5.5	▲4.6
Greens	Philipp Obladen	4,476	3.0	▼0.6	8,672	5.7	▼1.0
NPD					1,516	1.0	▲0.8
Tierschutzpartei					891	0.6	▲0.2
Familie					784	0.5	▲0.3
GRAUEN					671	0.4	▲0.1
REP					384	0.3	
PBC					207	0.1	
From Now on... Democracy Through Referendum					172	0.1	
Socialist Equality Party					70	0.0	
Centre					58	0.0	
BüSo					36	0.0	
MLPD					24	0.0	0.0
Informal votes		2,707			2,385		
Total valid votes		151,408			151,730		
Turnout		154,115	77.6	▼2.8			
CDU gain from SPD	Majority	3,308	2.2				
