= Crostau =

- Ortsteil of Schirgiswalde-Kirschau
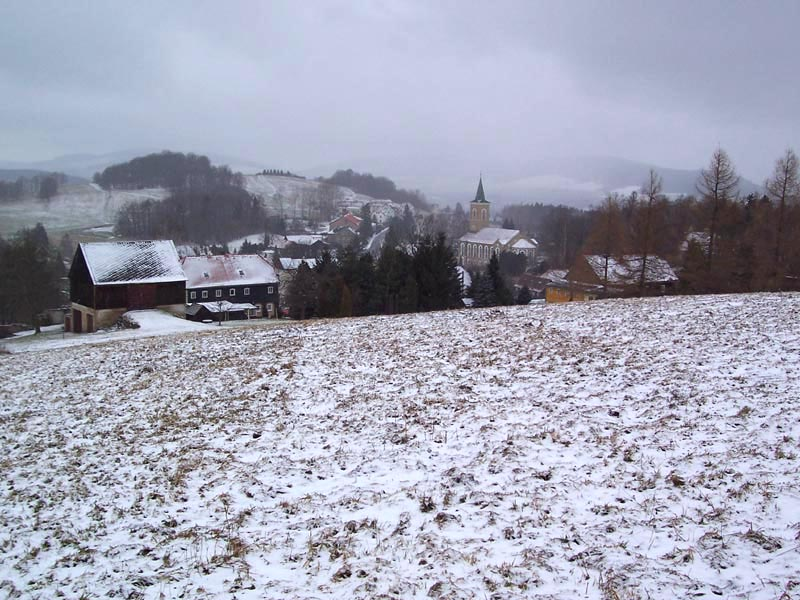

- Coat of arms
- Interactive map of Crostau
- Location within Germany Location within Saxony
- Coordinates: 51°5′N 14°27′E
- Country: Germany
- State: Saxony
- District: Bautzen
- Town: Schirgiswalde-Kirschau

Area
  - Total: 9.32 km^{2} (3.60 sq mi)
- Elevation: 363 m (1,191 ft)
- Time zone: UTC+01:00 (CET)
  - Summer (DST): UTC+02:00 (CEST)
- Postal codes: 02681
- Dialling codes: 03592
- Vehicle registration: BZ
- Website: www.crostau.de

Crostau (German pronunciation: [ˈkʁɔstaʊ]; Upper Sorbian: Chróstawa, pronounced [ˈkʁʊstawa]) is a village and former municipality in Upper Lusatia in the Bautzen district of eastern Saxony in Germany. It became part of the municipality of Schirgiswalde-Kirschau on 1 January 2011.

== Geography ==
Crostau is situated in the hills of Upper Lusatia. It is surrounded by several significant hills, such as the Kälbersteine (487 m), the Potsberg (448 m), the Wolfsberg (347 m), the Horken (307 m), and the Callenberger Berg (360 m).

Crostau is divided into two parts: Lower Crostau, with Kroste Castle, and Upper Crostau, with an old mansion and the church.

== History ==
Crostau is in an old settlement area, although the traces of settlement are not as old as those in the nearby Upper Lusatian Gefilde. In Lower Crostau, the first Slavic settlement dates back to the year 800 CE. With the big German settlement in the 10th up to the 12th century an older place was transformed into the small castle, called "Kroste". First it was used to secure trade routes, later it became a place of robbers. In 1352, the castle was destroyed by the "Six-cities-alliance" of Upper Lusatia, which was the first time Crostau was mentioned in a written work. Crostau has for centuries been a seat of several noble families, such as the Von Rechenbergs and the Von Watzdorfs. Within the German Empire (1871–1918), Crostau was part of the Kingdom of Saxony. In 1934 the formerly independent communities of Callenberg (Sorbian: Chemmberk), Carlsberg, and Wurbis formed the community of Crostau. In 1972 Halbendorf (Sorbian: Wbohow) also became part of Crostau.

== Religion ==
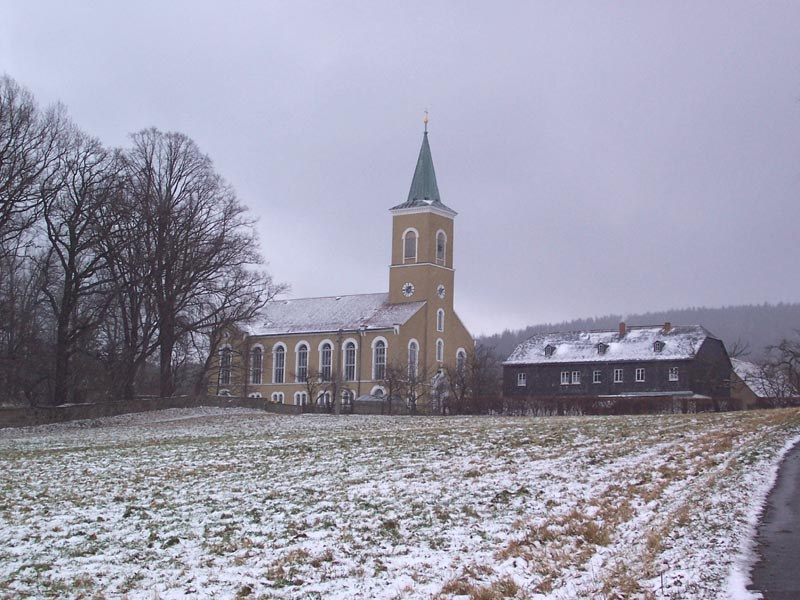
Crostau church

The present church was built in 1869 on the site of an older church that contained a 1732 organ by Gottfried Silbermann. The Silbermann organ is now in the newer church. Crostau is traditionally a Lutheran village. Today the churches of Crostau, Kirschau, and Schirgiswalde work closely together.

== Politics ==
Since German reunification, the CDU (conservative party) has been the leading political force in the community.

== Economy ==
Crostau is far from the important highways of the region and has no industry, but it is linked to tourist routes and has beautiful surroundings. Most of the inhabitants work in other towns or villages in the area.
