= Lerchenberg =

Lerchenberg may refer to:

== Places ==
=== Germany ===
- Lerchenberg (Bannewitz), a hill near Döhlen Basin in Saxony, Germany
- Lerchenberg (Dachwig), a hill of Thuringia
- Lerchenberg (Hildesheim), a hill in the Hildesheim Forest near Neuhof, Hildesheim, Niedersachsen
- Lerchenberg (Plauen), a hill of Saxony
- Lerchenberg (Gäu), a mountain near Wildberg, Baden-Württemberg
- Lerchenberg (Seulingswald), a hill in the Seulingswald in Thuringia
- Mainz-Lerchenberg, a quarter of Mainz, Rhineland-Palatinate
- A hamlet in the municipality of Konradsreuth, Hof, Bavaria
- A village of Wildberg, Baden-Württemberg

=== Other places ===
- Stare Serby (German: Lerchenberg), a village in Głogów, Lower Silesia, Poland
- A village of Erlenbach, Switzerland

== Other uses ==
- Lerchenberg (TV series), a German sitcom with Stephan Kampwirth
- Michael Lerchenberg (born 1953), German actor in TV series including Löwengrube – Die Grandauers und ihre Zeit

== See also ==
- Lerchenborg
- Lärchenberg
