= Upper Lusatian house =

Swiss log house type

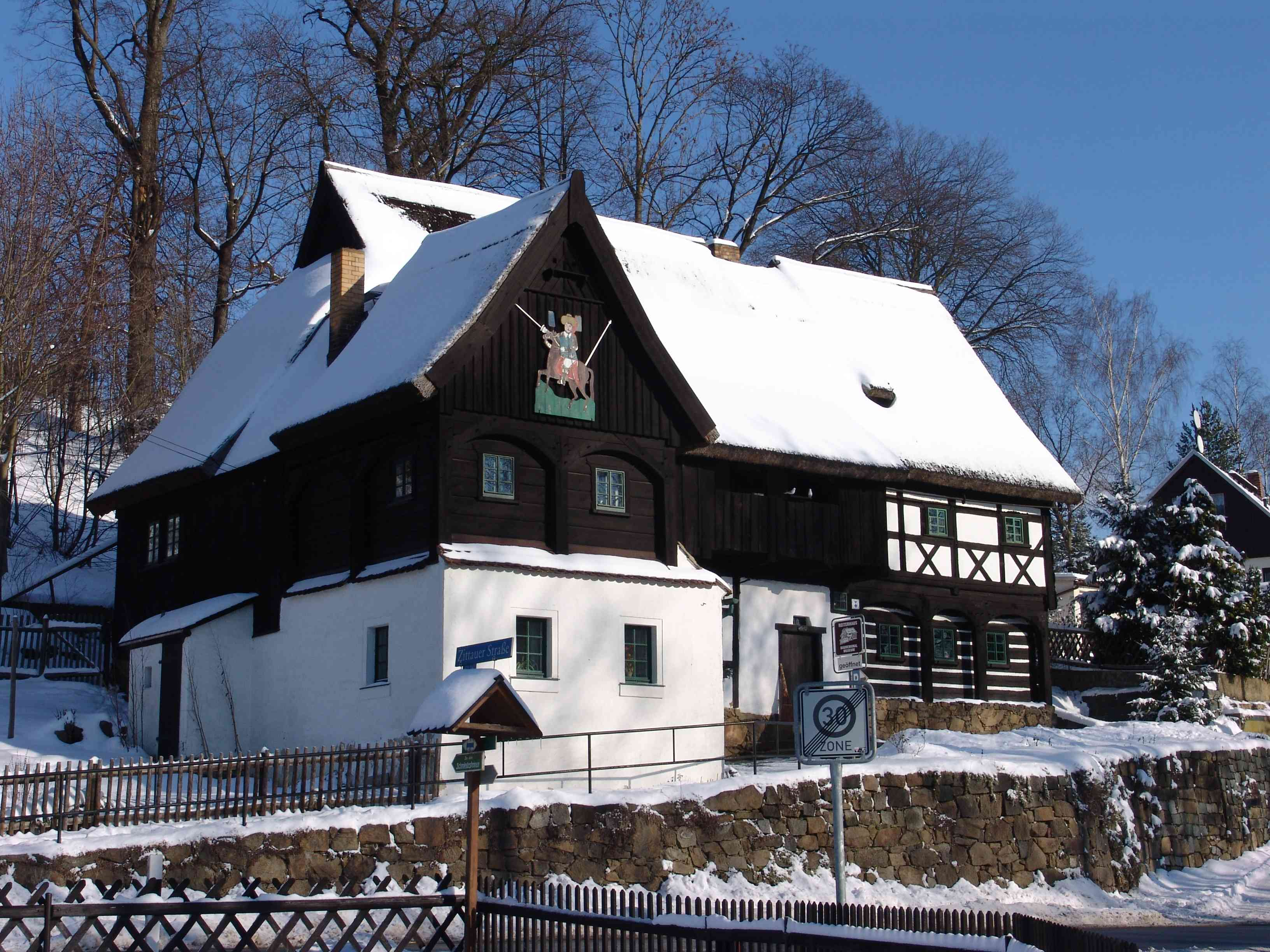
Reiterhaus in Neusalza-Spremberg

The Upper Lusatian house (Czech: Podstávkový dům) or Umgebindehaus is a special type of house that combines log house, timber-framing and building stone methods of construction. It is especially common in the region running from Silesia through Upper Lusatia and North Bohemia and into Saxon Switzerland, as well as East Thuringia.

== Characteristics ==
The Upper Lusatian house is defined by the constructional separation of its living area from the roof, or its living area from the upper story and roof. The main characteristic of the normal type is "a wooden support system, which runs around the living area of the house made of logs or boards, which has the job of freeing the frame of the living area from the weight of the roof (in single-storey houses) or the roof and upper storey (in two-storey houses)."

Upper Lusatian houses are transversely divided Middle German houses or Ernhäuser. The hallway runs transversely across the house and separates the ground floor into living and working areas. The living area or Blockstube is usually located at the eastern or southern gable end in order to protect it from damp. The working area, of solid construction (usually rubble stone) is located opposite the Blockstube. This is where the animal stalls or stables, store rooms and barn are housed. A building in which the solid section is replaced by another Blockstube is known as a Doppelstubenhaus ("double living area house").

Above the Blockstube (Handweberstube) the upper storey or roof rests on wooden posts that are stabilised by triangulation with jetty brackets (Knagge) or braces (Kopfverbund). It is thus independent of the carrying elements below it and may be freely worked on. The upper storey is usually of timber framed construction. By contrast, especially in North Bohemia, the upper storey is made of log cabin construction.

== Emergence of the construction method ==
The log cabin had proved its worth among the Slavic population (see also Schrotholzhäuser) in the regional climates. The German settlers, mainly from Franconia and Thuringia, who settled here in the 13th century, brought with them the timber frame, already known to the Germanic tribes, as a wood-saving, stable construction method: it also made it possible to erect multi-story buildings. However, it was difficult to unite the two construction methods, since the loss of length of wood with the grain is much less. Therefore, for centuries, village craftsmen developed the Umgebinde as their own folk construction method. At the end of the 18th century, the typical Umgebinde arch, which gives the houses their name, was created. This combined functionality and durability with beauty.

== Gallery ==
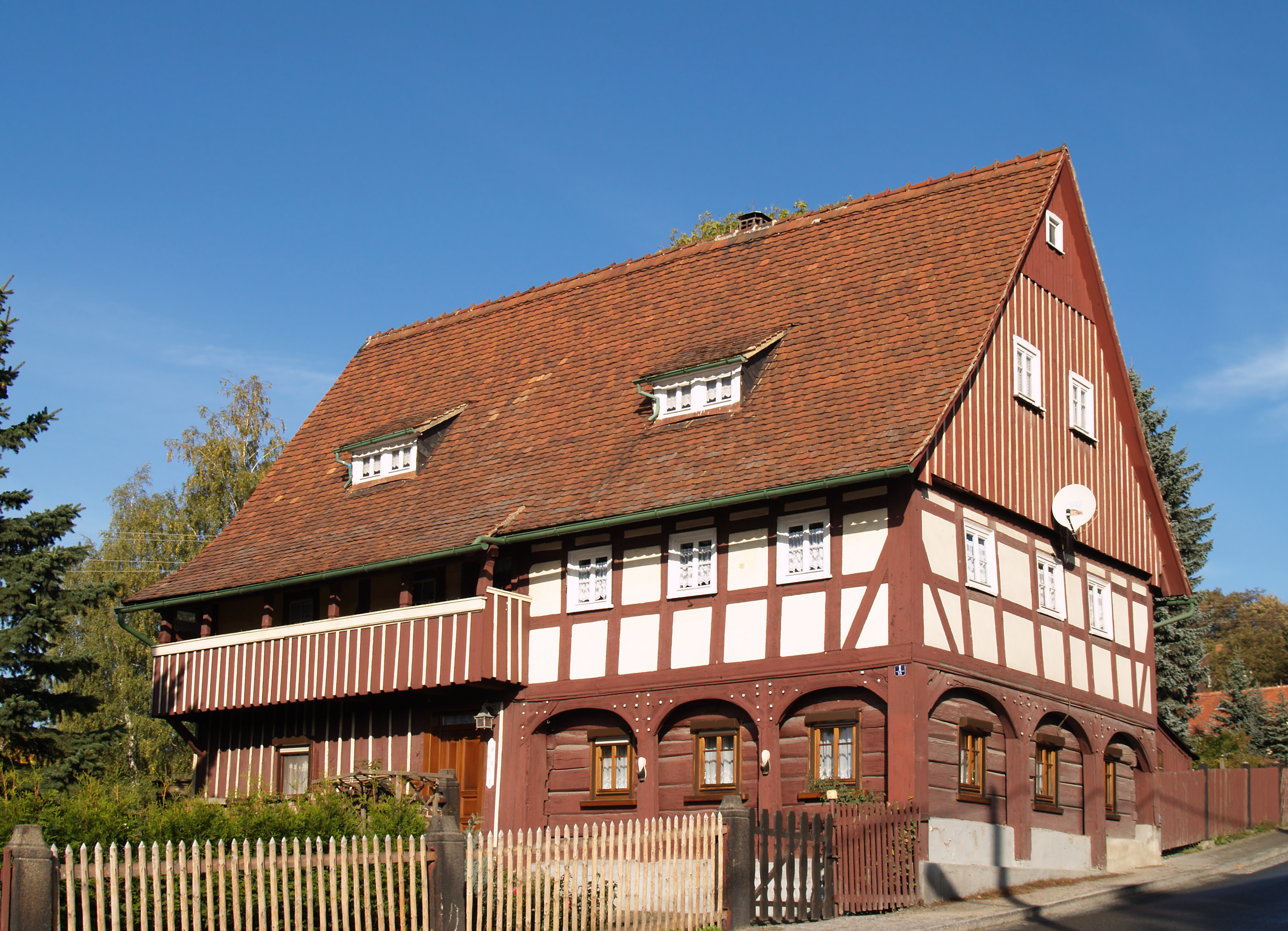
Umgebindehaus in Ebersbach/Sa.

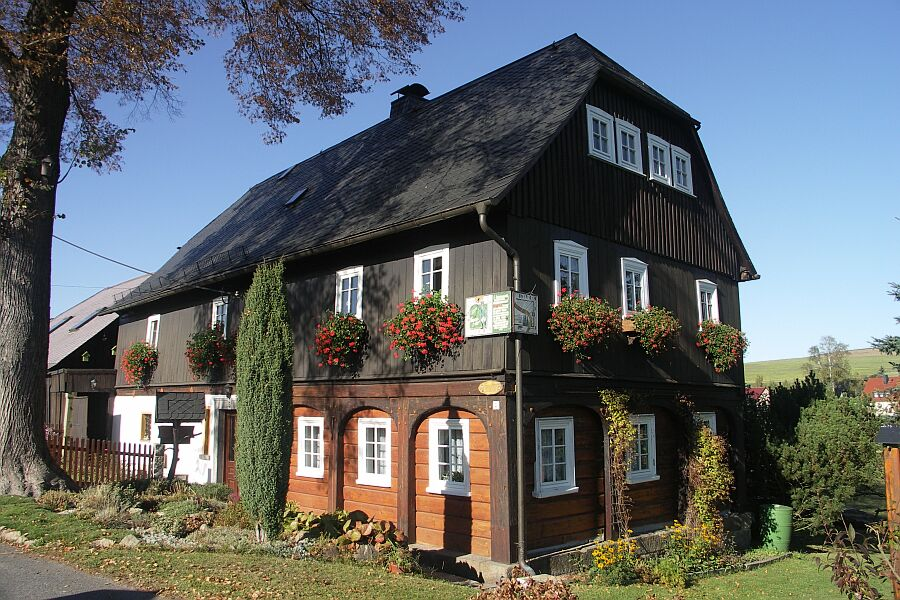
Umgebindehaus in Taubenheim

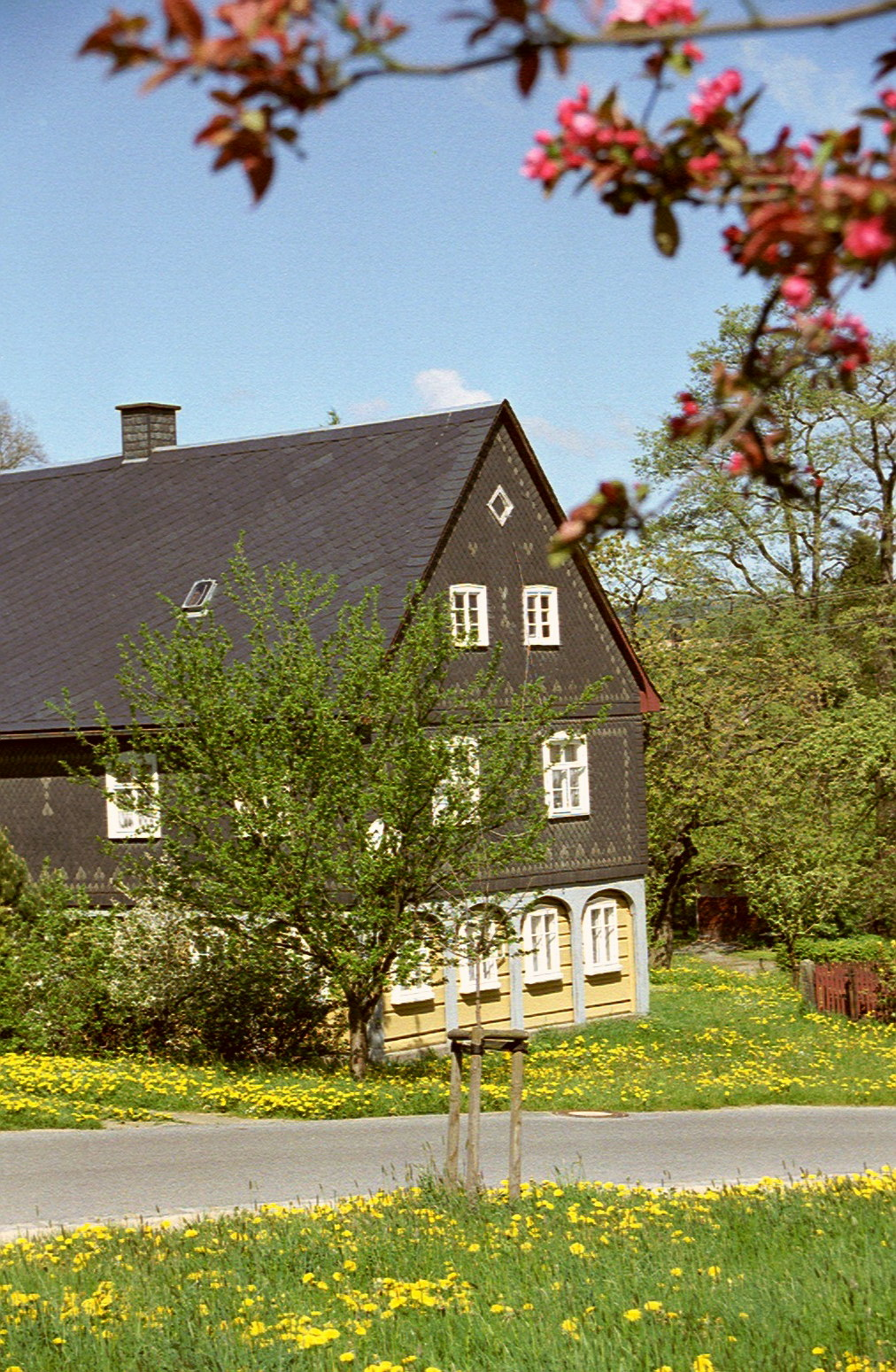
Umgebindehaus in Sohland

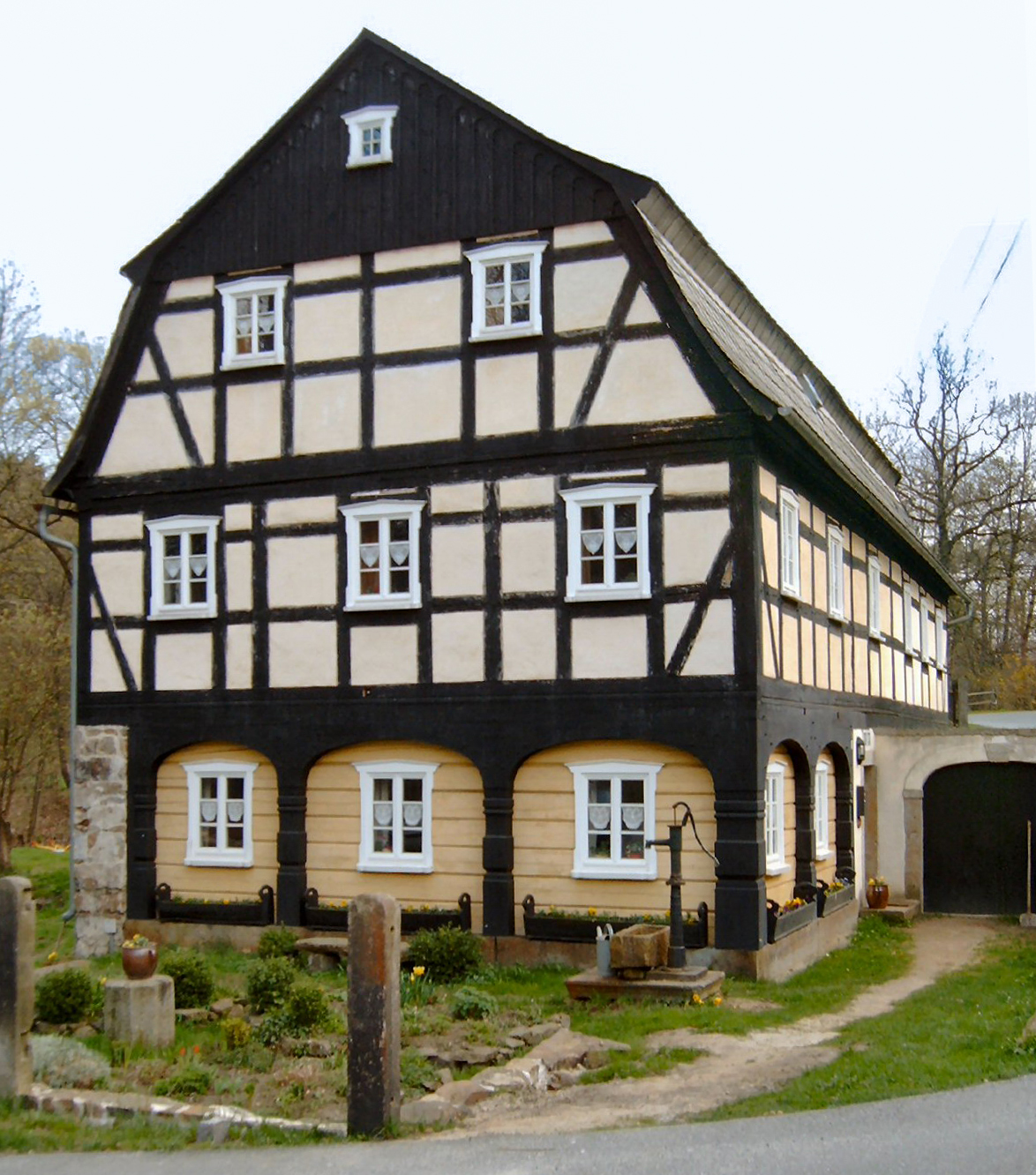
Former mill in Schirgiswalde

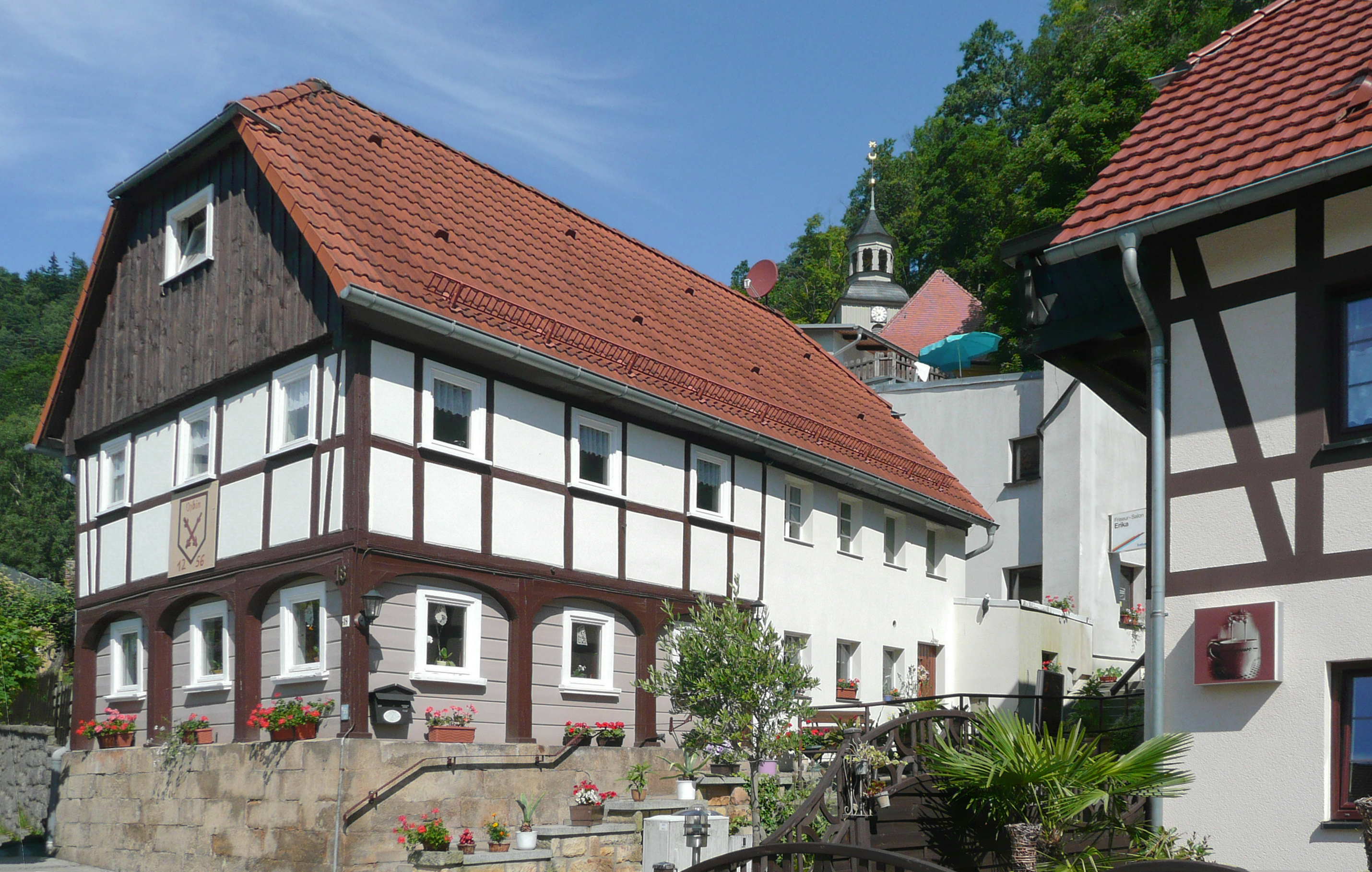
Umgebindehaus in Oybin

== Bibliography ==
- Manfred Hammer: Bauernhäuser, Bauernhöfe, Dörfer. Historisch wertvolle Gebäude und Dorfanlagen im Kreis Löbau-Zittau. Verein Ländliche Bauwerte in Sachsen e.V., Dresden 2009
- Jürgen Cieslak (Hrsg.): Umgebinde : eine einzigartige Bauweise im Dreiländereck Deutschland - Polen - Tschechien. Sächsischer Verein für Volksbauweise e.V., Langewiesche, Königstein i. Ts. 2007, ISBN 978-3-7845-5210-1
- Karl Bernert: Umgebindehäuser. VEB Verlag für Bauwesen, Berlin 1988, ISBN 3-345-00001-6
- Frank Delitz: Umgebinde im Überblick : Zu Fragen der Geschichte, Verbreitung und landschaftlichen Ausprägung einer Volksbauweise. Graph. Werk. Zittau, Zittau 1987
- Karl Bernert, Jürgen Cieslak: Wir wohnen in einem Umgebindehaus : Arbeitsmaterial zur Erhaltung u. sachgemäßen Pflege d. Umgebindebauweise in d. Oberlausitz. Ges. für Denkmalpflege im Kulturbund d. DDR, Dresden 1982
