= Hardenberg-Wilthen =

Distillery in Nörten-Hardenberg, Germany

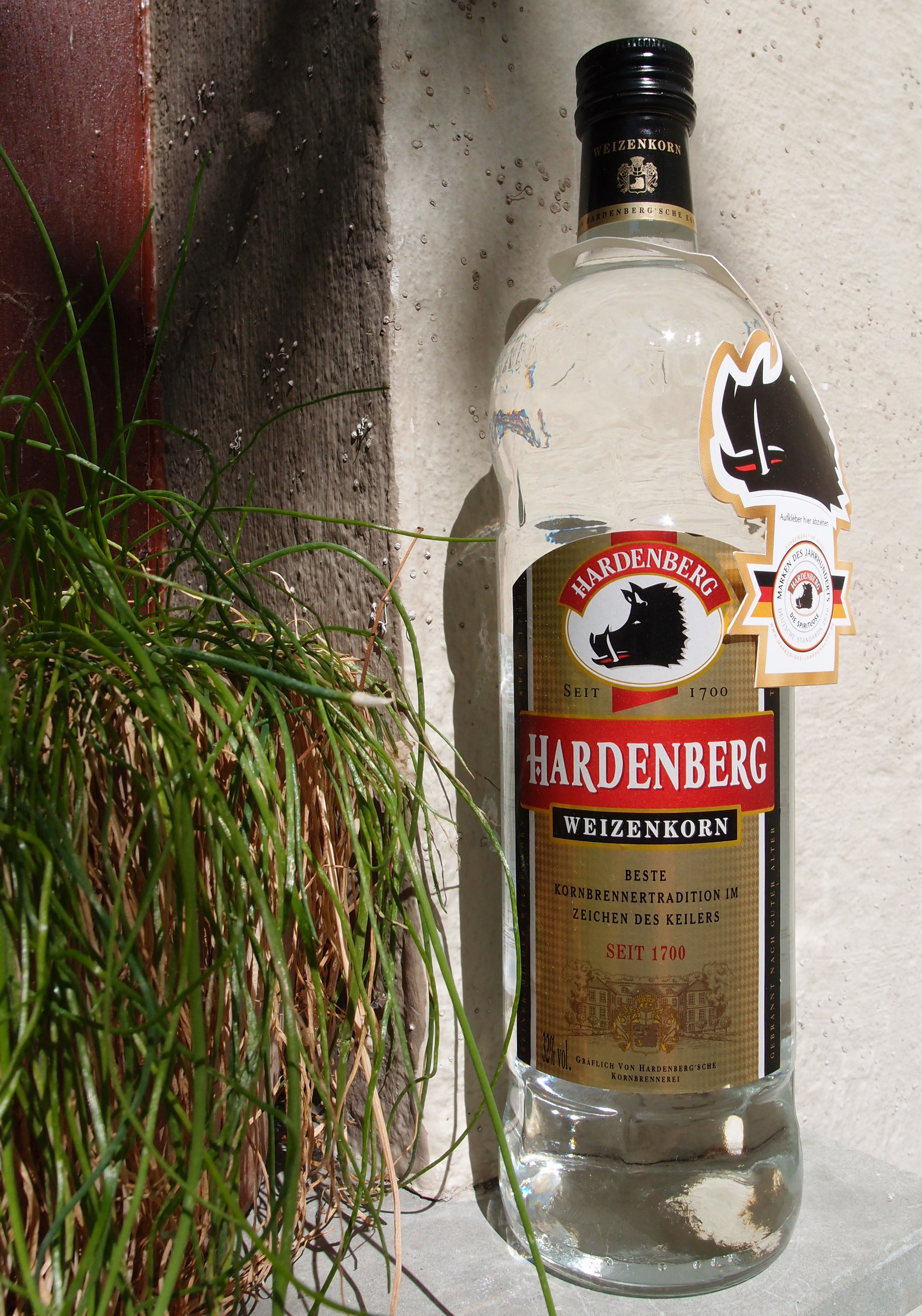
Hardenberg Weizenkorn

Hardenberg Wilthen AG is a distillery in Nörten-Hardenberg and Wilthen, Germany. It produces Korn and a number of other liquors. The company ranks as Germany's second largest liquor producer.

== History ==
Hardenberg Wilthen has been owned and managed by the Hardenberg family since 1700. The ancestral home of the knights of Hardenberg is Hardenberg Castle at Nörten-Hardenberg, which the family acquired in 1287 and owns to this day. They were created barons and, in 1778, counts.

The company is made up of three divisions:

- The Schwartzhog Grain Distillery "Gräflich von Hardenberg'sche Kornbrennerei", at Hardenberg.
- The wine distillery, "Wilthener Weinbrennerei", founded at Wilthen in 1843 and acquired by Hardenberg in 1992.
- The ancient liquor producing plant "Der Lachs".
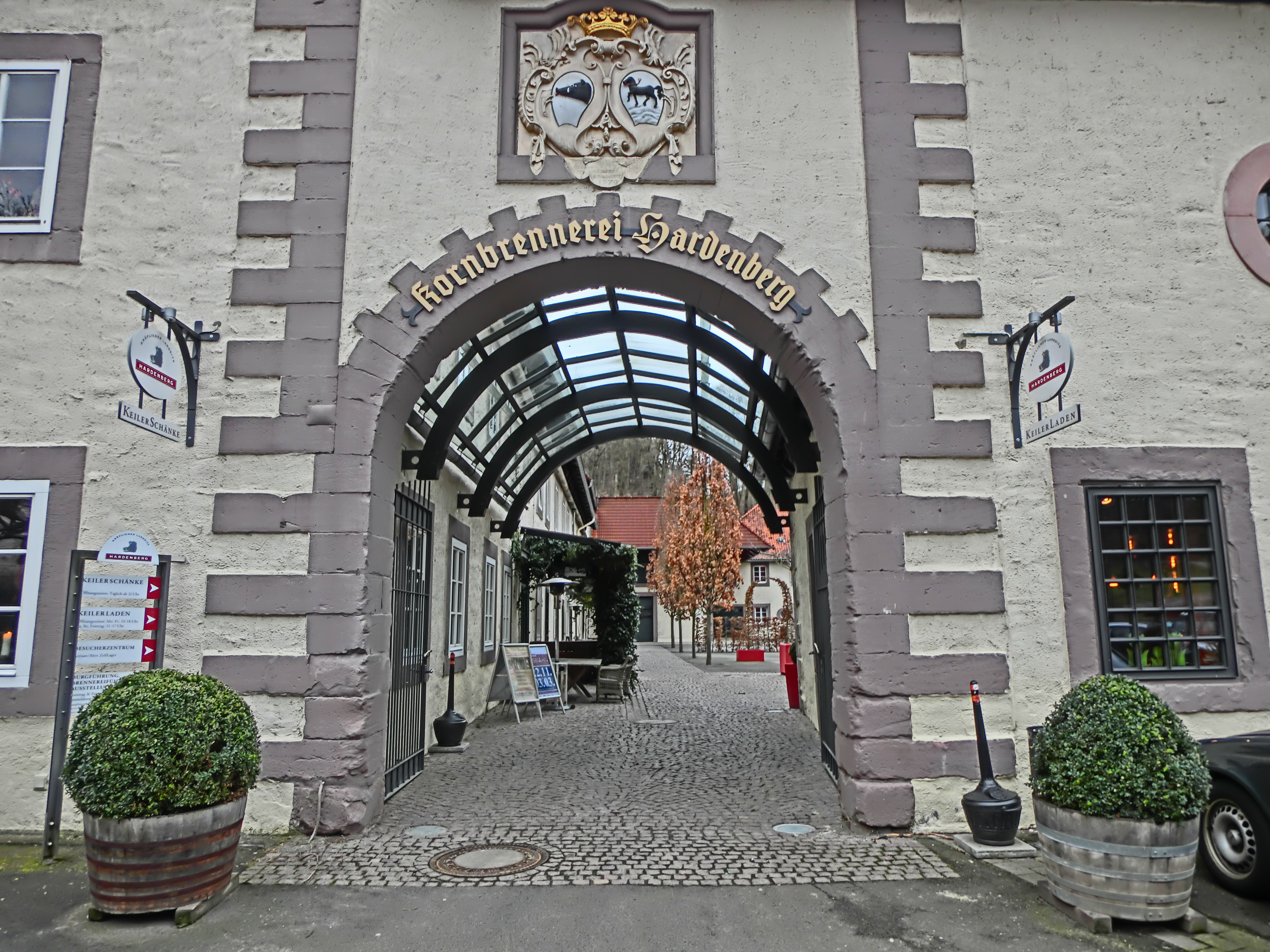
Hardenberg distillery

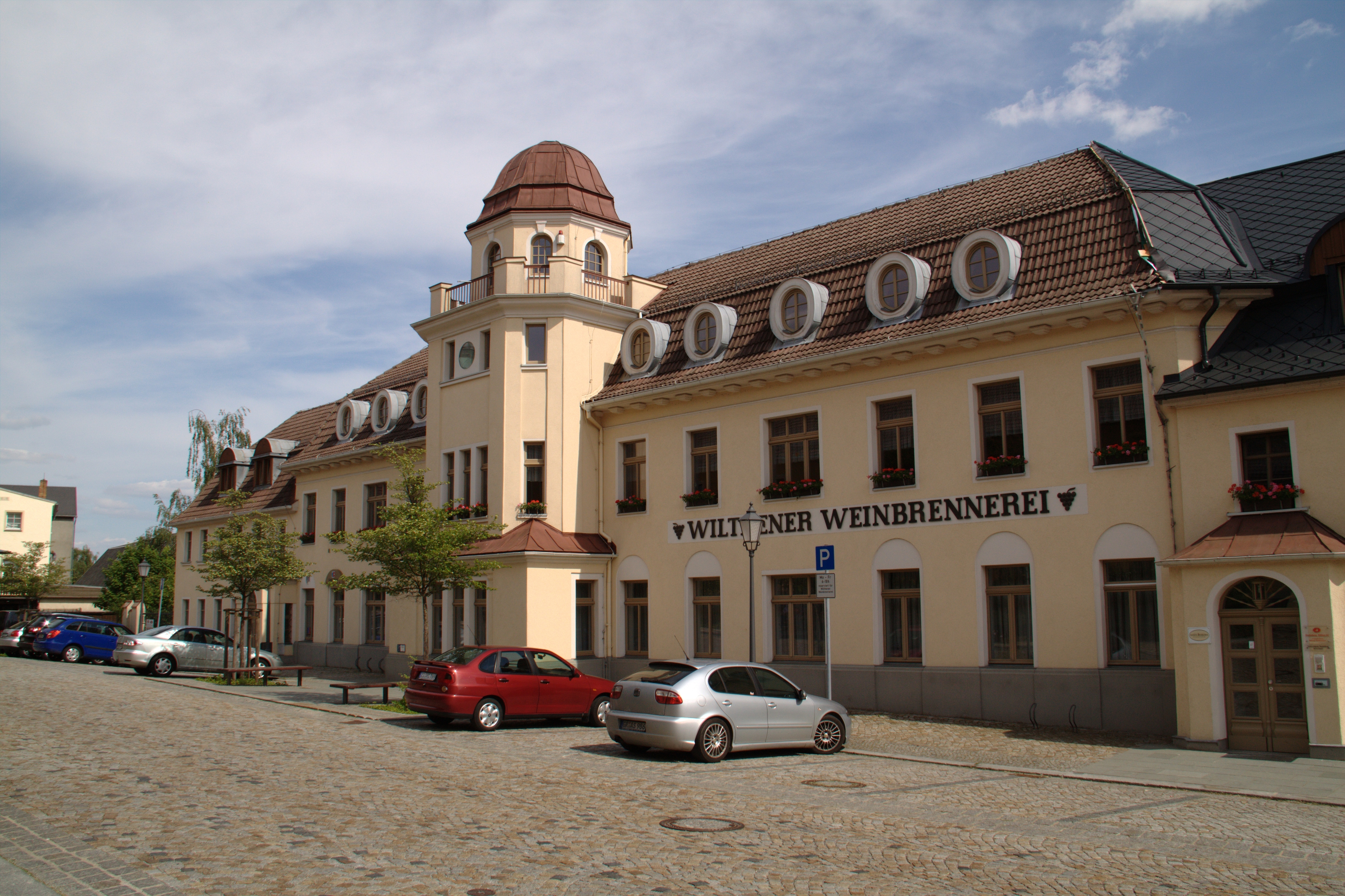
Wilthen distillery

== Products ==
The company's most important product is Wilthener Goldkrone (with 26 million bottles a year), its most traditional product is Hardenberg Weizenkorn, furthermore Schwartzhog, Sambalita, Helios, Persiko, Milder Wacholder, Kleiner Keiler, Wilthener Gebirgskräuter, Danziger Goldwasser and Miamee. As of 2011, the turnover is reported to be 97 million Euros.

=== Schwartzhog ===
Schwartzhog
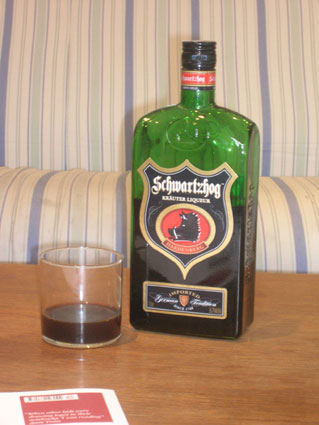
- Type: Digestif
- Manufacturer: Hardenberg-Wilthen AG
- Origin: Nörten-Hardenberg, Germany
- Introduced: 2008
- Alcohol by volume: 38%
- Proof (US): 70
- Color: Dark brown
- Website: www.hardenberg-wilthen.de

Schwartzhog is a brand name of "Kräuterlikör" (herbal liqueur). Traditionally it is consumed as a digestif liqueur; its ingredients include herbs, fruits and roots such as wormwood, ginger and “Sauwurz” (Gentiana lutea).

==== Sauwurz ====
"(Gentian) comforts the heart and preserves it against faintings and swoonings." Nicholas Culpepper, Complete Herbal (1653)

Sauwurz, (literally "Hogroot") is a member of the Gentian family and is found across central and southern Europe, at high altitudes. Its inclusion in the original Schwartzhog recipe, would have been for its digestive qualities, for the belief that it strengthened the body's inner systems.

While Sauwurz's digestive properties were recognised by herbalists over 3000 years ago, superstition and old wives tales attributed other, less scientific qualities to this variety of the gentian root. It was said that wild boar in the Black Forest were drawn to it for its aphrodisiac qualities, hence the name "Sauwurz" or Hogroot. There is no scientific basis to this myth, nor any indication that Hogroot has any such effect on humans.

== The Hardenberg Hog ==
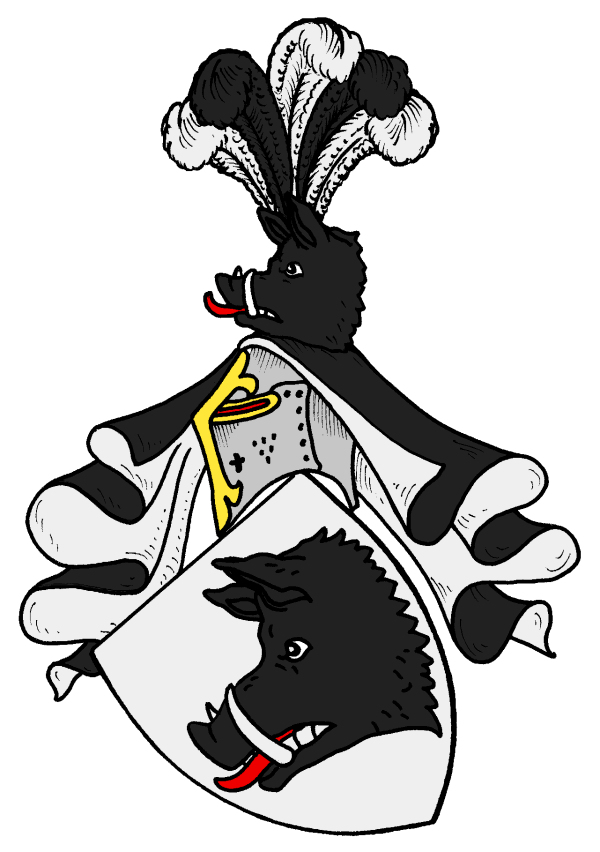
Coat-of-arms of the Hardenberg family

The hog or wild boar in the family coat-of-arms dates back to the 14th century, when Germany was made up of rival kingdoms, baronies and principalities. Hardenberg castle was built by the Electors of Mainz to defend their property in the region against feuds by neighbouring chieftains, and the knights of Hardenberg served as their Burgmanns. On one particular night, a group of warriors from Plesse Castle approached Hardenberg Castle under cover of darkness, to take the Hardenbergs by surprise. Before the invaders could take positions, a wild boar began to squeal loudly, warning the Hardenberg army in time to see off the attack and prevent a siege. From that day, the head of a black wild boar - or Schwartz Hog - has been the family crest of the Hardenberg family, and later of their business and its products. "The liquor with the head of a boar" ("Der Korn mit dem Keilerkopf").
