= Schirgiswalde-Kirschau =

- Town
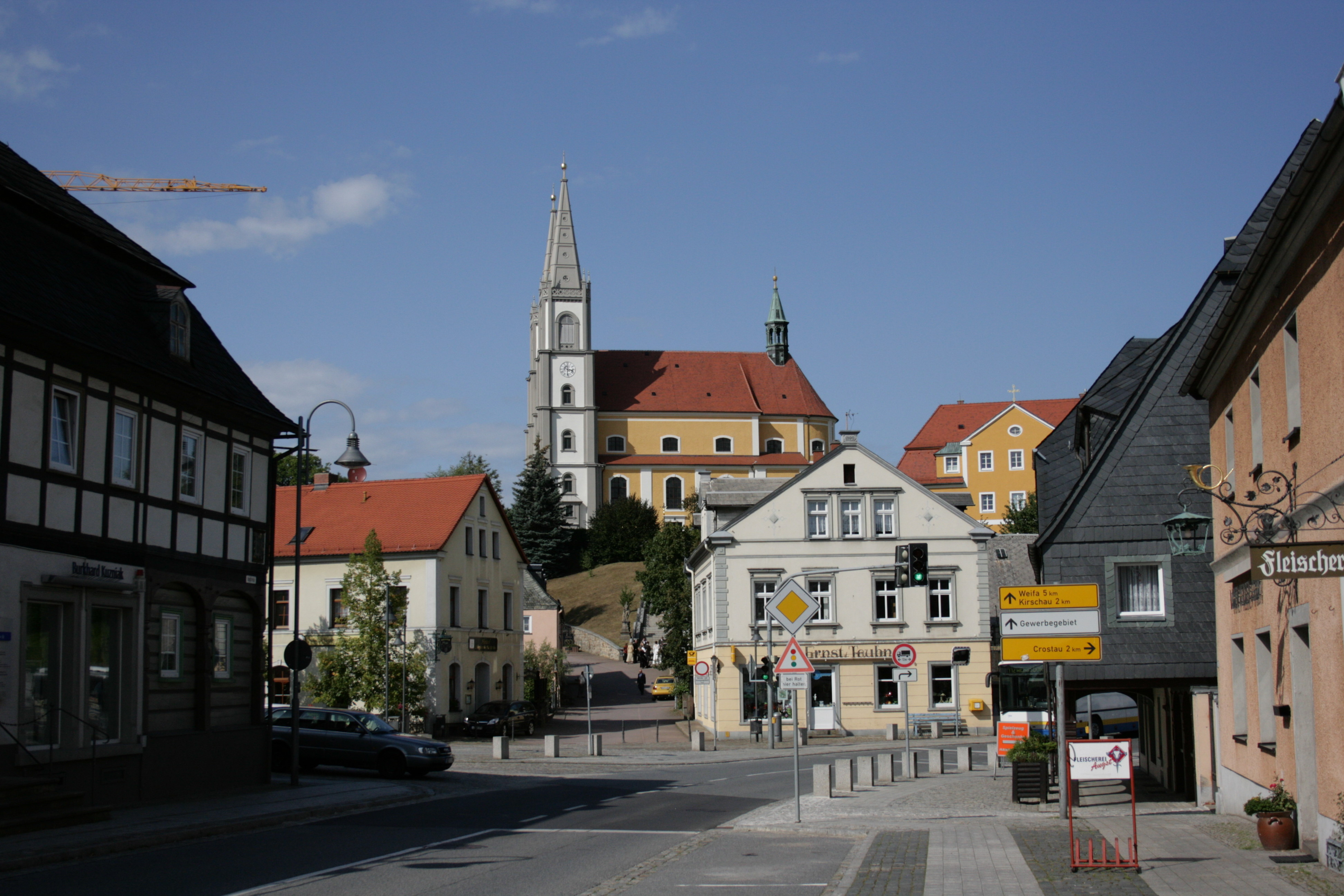
- Main street with the Church of the Assumption of the Virgin Mary

- Location of Schirgiswalde-Kirschau within Bautzen district
- Interactive map of Schirgiswalde-Kirschau
- Location within Germany Location within Saxony
- Coordinates: 51°6′N 14°26′E
- Country: Germany
- State: Saxony
- District: Bautzen

Government
  - Mayor (2018–25): Sven Gabriel (FDP)

Area
  - Total: 24.34 km^{2} (9.40 sq mi)
- Elevation: 250 m (820 ft)

Population (2025-12-31)
  - Total: 5,754
  - Density: 236.4/km^{2} (612.3/sq mi)
- Time zone: UTC+01:00 (CET)
  - Summer (DST): UTC+02:00 (CEST)
- Postal codes: 02681
- Dialling codes: 03592, 035938
- Vehicle registration: BZ, BIW, HY, KM
- Website: https://www.stadt-schirgiswalde-kirschau.de/

Schirgiswalde-Kirschau (German pronunciation: [ʃɪʁɡɪsˈvaldə ˈkɪʁʃaʊ]; Upper Sorbian: Šěrachow-Korzym, pronounced [ˈʃɪʁaxɔf ˈkɔʁzɨm]) is a town in the district of Bautzen, in Saxony, Germany. It was formed on January 1, 2011 by the merger of the former municipalities Schirgiswalde, Kirschau and Crostau.
