= Kälbersteine =

MOUNTAIN

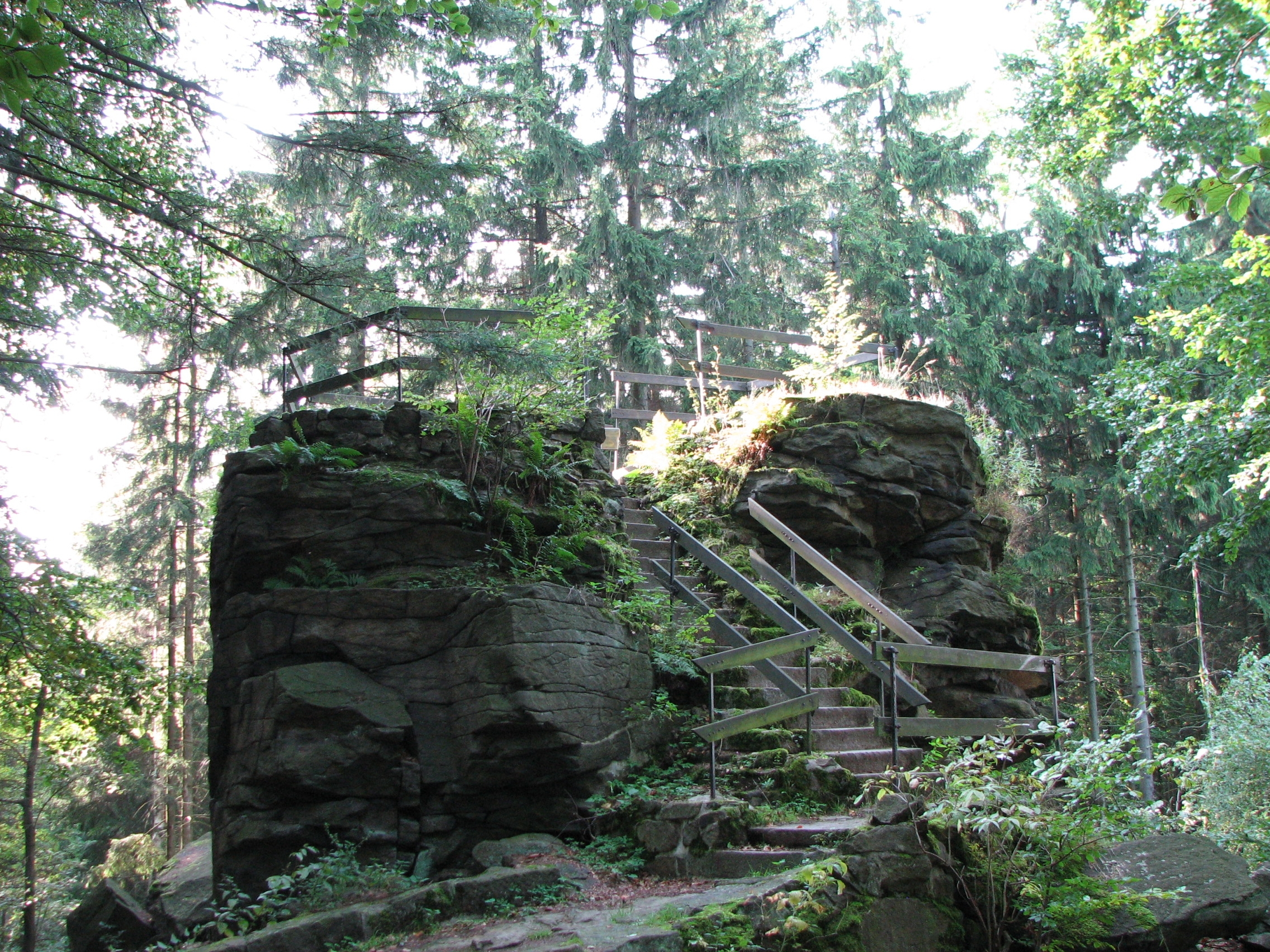
- Kälbersteine summit

Highest point
- Elevation: 487 m (1,598 ft)
- Coordinates: 51°04′22″N 14°27′11″E

Geography
- Location within Saxony
- Location: Saxony, Germany
- Parent range: Lusatian Mountains

Kälbersteine (Upper Sorbian: Ćelatakamjenje) is a mountain in the district of Bautzen, Saxony. It is a member of the Lusatian Mountains and is located roughly a km south of Crostau.

== Geography ==
The mountain summit consists of a small granite outcrop, located 205 meters above the valley floor. The majority of the mountains woodland is spruce, although red beech, sycamore and English Oak are also occasionally seen.
