= Dietmar Nietan =

German politician

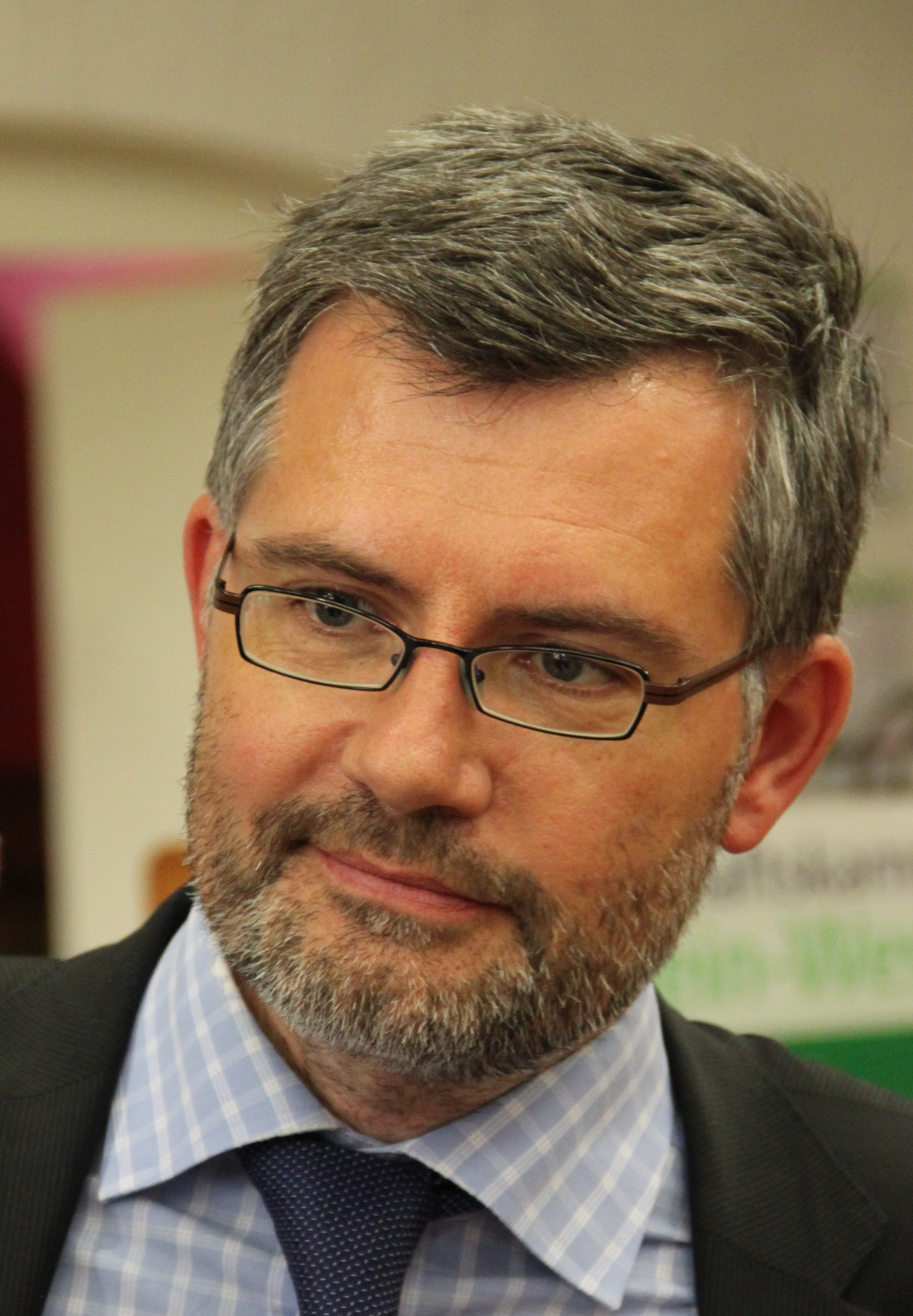
- Dietmar Nietan in 2013

Treasurer of the Social Democratic Party
- Incumbent
- Assumed office 26 January 2014
- Leader: Sigmar Gabriel; Martin Schulz; Andrea Nahles; Norbert Walter-Borjans; Saskia Esken; Lars Klingbeil
- Preceded by: Barbara Hendricks

Member of the Bundestag
- In office 2005–2025
- In office 1998–2002

Personal details
- Born: 25 May 1964 (age 62) Düren, West Germany (now Germany)
- Party: SPD
- Education: University of Cologne

Dietmar Heinrich Nietan (born 25 May 1964) is a German politician of the Social Democratic Party (SPD) who served as a member of the Bundestag from the state of North Rhine-Westphalia from 1998 to 2002 and again from 2005 to 2025.

In addition to his parliamentary work, Nietan served as Coordinator of German-Polish Intersocietal and Cross-Border Cooperation at the Federal Foreign Office in the coalition government of Chancellor Olaf Scholz from 2022 to 2025.

In 2014, Nietan became the SPD's treasurer, making him part of the party's national leadership under current co-chairs Saskia Esken and Lars Klingbeil.

== Political career ==
Nietan became a member of the Bundestag for the second time in the 2017 German federal election. He was a member of the Committee on Foreign Affairs; in this capacity, he served as his parliamentary group's rapporteur on the European Union's Common Foreign and Security Policy and relations to Turkey. He also served on the Committee on European Affairs from 1998 until 2005 and from 2009 until 2013.

In addition to his committee assignments, Nietan was part of the German-Polish Parliamentary Friendship Group. From 2005 until 2009, he chaired the German Parliamentary Friendship Group with Belgium and Luxembourg.

Within the SPD parliamentary group, Nietan belonged to the Parliamentary Left, a left-wing movement.

In the negotiations to form a coalition government under the leadership of Chancellor Angela Merkel following the 2017 federal elections, Nietan was part of the working group on energy, climate protection and the environment, led by Armin Laschet, Georg Nüßlein and Barbara Hendricks.

In the negotiations to form a so-called traffic light coalition of the SPD, the Green Party and the Free Democratic Party (FDP) following the 2021 federal elections, Nietan was part of his party's delegation in the working group on foreign policy, defence, development cooperation and human rights, co-chaired by Heiko Maas, Omid Nouripour and Alexander Graf Lambsdorff.

In April 2024, Nietan announced that he would not stand in the 2025 federal elections but instead resign from active politics by the end of the parliamentary term.

== Other activities ==
=== Corporate boards ===
- Deutsche Druck- und Verlagsgesellschaft (ddvg), Member of the Supervisory Board

=== Non-profit organizations ===
- European Council on Foreign Relations (ECFR), Member (since 2020)
- German Poland Institute (DPI), Member of the Board of Trustees
- German-Polish Science Foundation (DPWS), Member of the Board of Trustees
- Foundation "Remembrance, Responsibility and Future", Member of the Board of Trustees
- Gustav Heinemann Civic Award, Member of the Board of Trustees
- Education and Science Workers' Union (GEW), Member
- German Federation for the Environment and Nature Conservation (BUND), Member
