= Thomas Rachel =

German politician

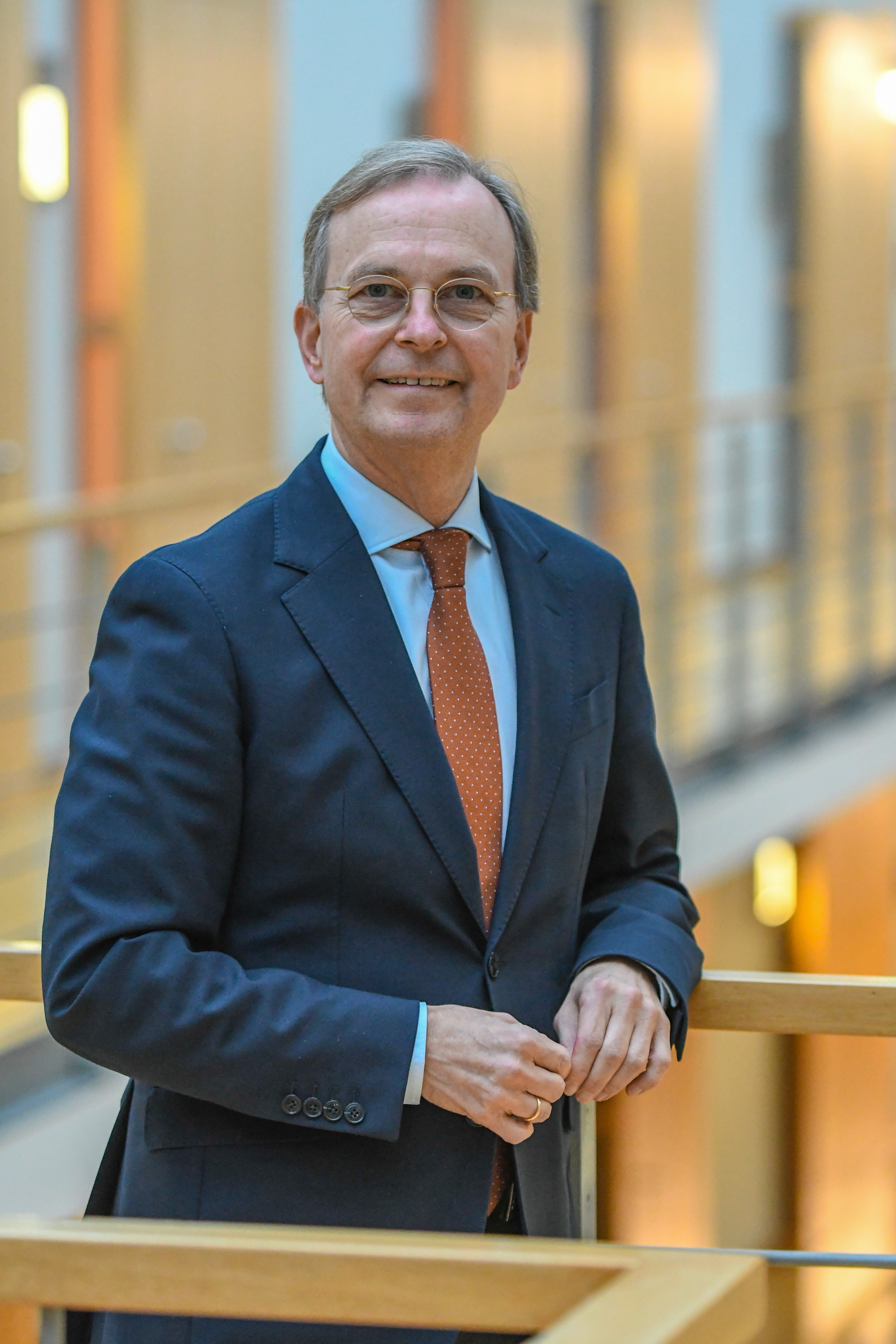
- Thomas Rachel in 2020

Member of the Bundestag
- Incumbent
- Assumed office 1994

Personal details
- Born: Thomas Walther Rachel; 17 May 1962 (age 64) Düren, West Germany (now Germany)
- Party: CDU
- Education: University of Bonn

Thomas Walther Rachel (born 17 May 1962) is a German politician of the Christian Democratic Union (CDU) who has been serving as a member of the Bundestag from the state of North Rhine-Westphalia since 1994. He has been representing the Düren (electoral district) since 2005.

In addition to his parliamentary work, Rachel served as Parliamentary State Secretary at the Federal Ministry of Education and Research in the government of Chancellor Angela Merkel from 2005 to 2021. Since 2025, he has been serving as Commissioner for Global Freedom of Religion at the Federal Foreign Office in the government of Chancellor Friedrich Merz.

== Early career ==
From 1986 until 1987, Rachel worked as parliamentary assistant to Matthias Wissmann.

== Political career ==
Rachel first became a member of the Bundestag in the 1994 German federal election. From 1994 until 2005, he served on the Committee for Education, Research and Technology Assessment. In addition to his committee assignments, he also served as deputy chairman of the German-Greek Parliamentary Friendship Group from 1997 until 2005 and 2021 until 2024. Since 2025 he is the chairman of the German-Greek parliamentary group.

Since 2003, Rachel has been chairing the Evangelical Working Group of the CDU/CSU (EAK).

From the 2005 elections until today, Rachel served as Parliamentary State Secretary at the Federal Ministry of Education and Research in the government of Chancellor Angela Merkel, under the leadership of successive ministers Annette Schavan (2005–2013, Johanna Wanka (2013–2018) and Anja Karliczek (2018–2021).

In the negotiations to form a "grand coalition" of Chancellor Angela Merkel's Christian Democrats (CDU together with the Bavarian CSU) and the Social Democrats (SPD) following the 2013 federal elections, Rachel was part of the CDU/CSU delegation in the working group on education and research policy. In similar negotiations following the 2017 federal elections, he was again part of the working group on education policy.

From 2021until today, Rachel served on the Committee on Economic Cooperation and Development.

He has been a member of the Committee on Foreign Affairs since 2025.

In the negotiations to form a coalition government of the CDU and Green Party under Minister-President of North Rhine-Westphalia Hendrik Wüst following the 2022 state elections, Rachel was part of his party’s delegation in the working group on science, digitization and innovation.

== Other activities ==
=== Corporate boards ===
- Westenergie, Member of the Future Council (since 2023)

=== Non-profit organizations ===
- German Institute for Development Evaluation (DEval), Member of the Advisory Board (from 2022 until 2025)
- Leo Baeck Foundation, Member of the Board of Trustees (since 2022)
- Evangelical Church in Germany (EKD), Member of the council (since 2015)
