= Schirgiswalde =

- Ortschaft of Schirgiswalde-Kirschau
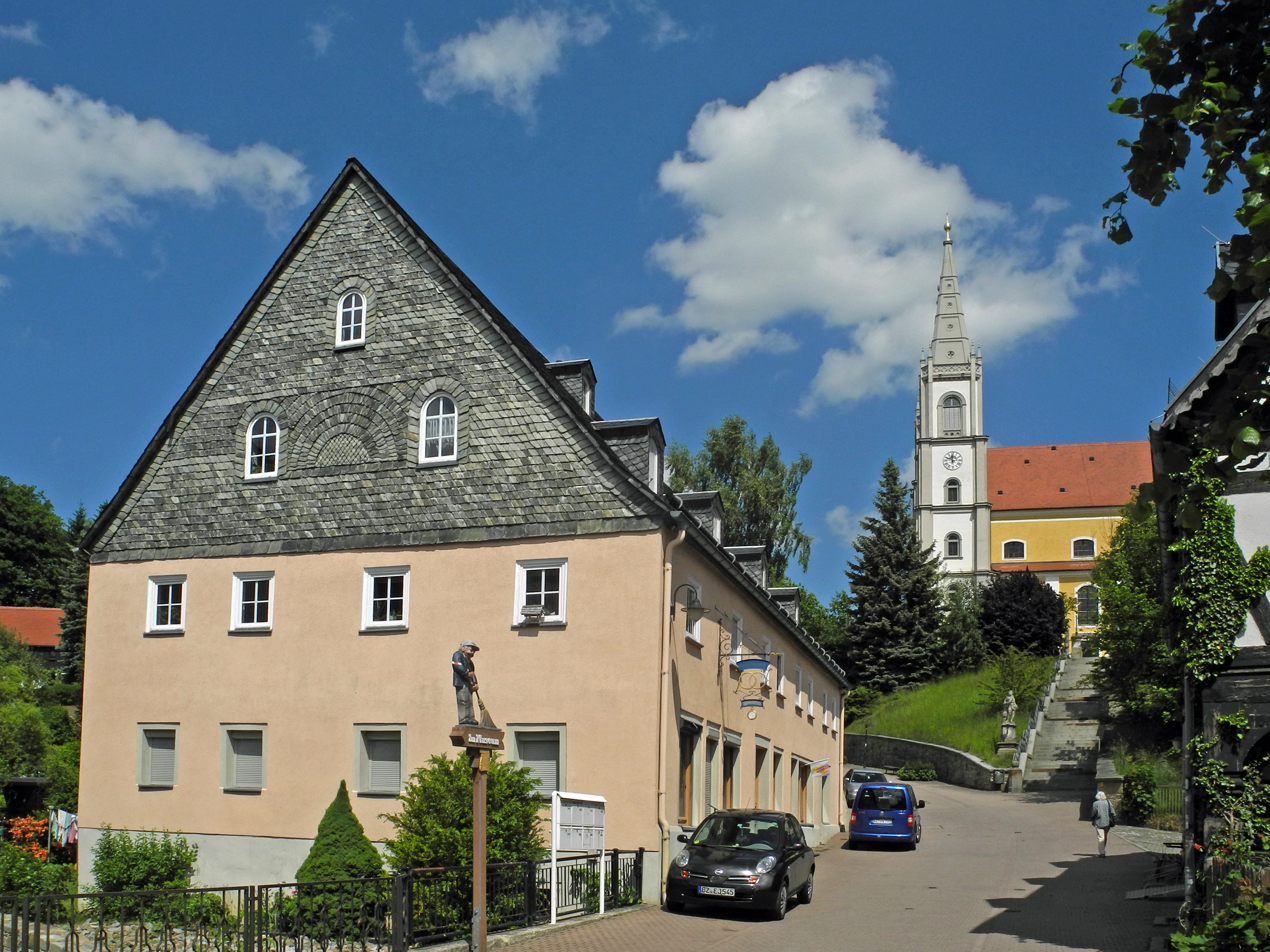
- Main street with the Church of the Assumption of the Virgin Mary

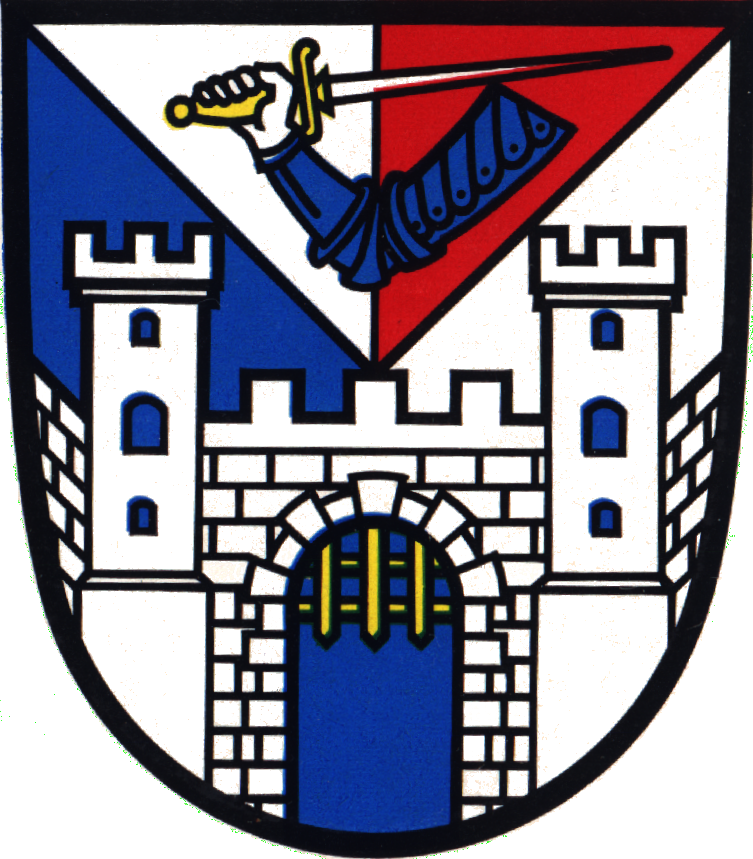
- Coat of arms
- Interactive map of Schirgiswalde
- Location within Germany Location within Saxony
- Coordinates: 51°04′37″N 14°25′43″E
- Country: Germany
- State: Saxony
- District: Bautzen
- Town: Schirgiswalde-Kirschau

Area
  - Total: 8.48 km^{2} (3.27 sq mi)
- Elevation: 342 m (1,122 ft)

Population (2009-12-31)
  - Total: 2,883
  - Density: 340/km^{2} (881/sq mi)
- Time zone: UTC+01:00 (CET)
  - Summer (DST): UTC+02:00 (CEST)
- Postal codes: 02681
- Dialling codes: 03592
- Vehicle registration: BZ
- Website: stadt-schirgiswalde-kirschau.de

Schirgiswalde (German pronunciation: [ʃɪʁɡɪsˈvaldə]; Upper Sorbian: Šěrachów, pronounced [ˈʃɪʁaxɔf]; Czech: Šerachov; Polish: Zerachów) is a town and a former municipality in the district of Bautzen in Saxony in eastern Germany. Since 1 January 2011, it is part of the town Schirgiswalde-Kirschau. It is located on the river Spree, 15 km south of Bautzen, near the border with the Czech Republic. The small town is an official place of relaxation (staatlich anerkannter Erholungsort). Schirgiswalde is an Ortschaft of the town Schirgiswalde-Kirschau. It consists of the Ortsteile Schirgiswalde and Neuschirgiswalde.

== History ==
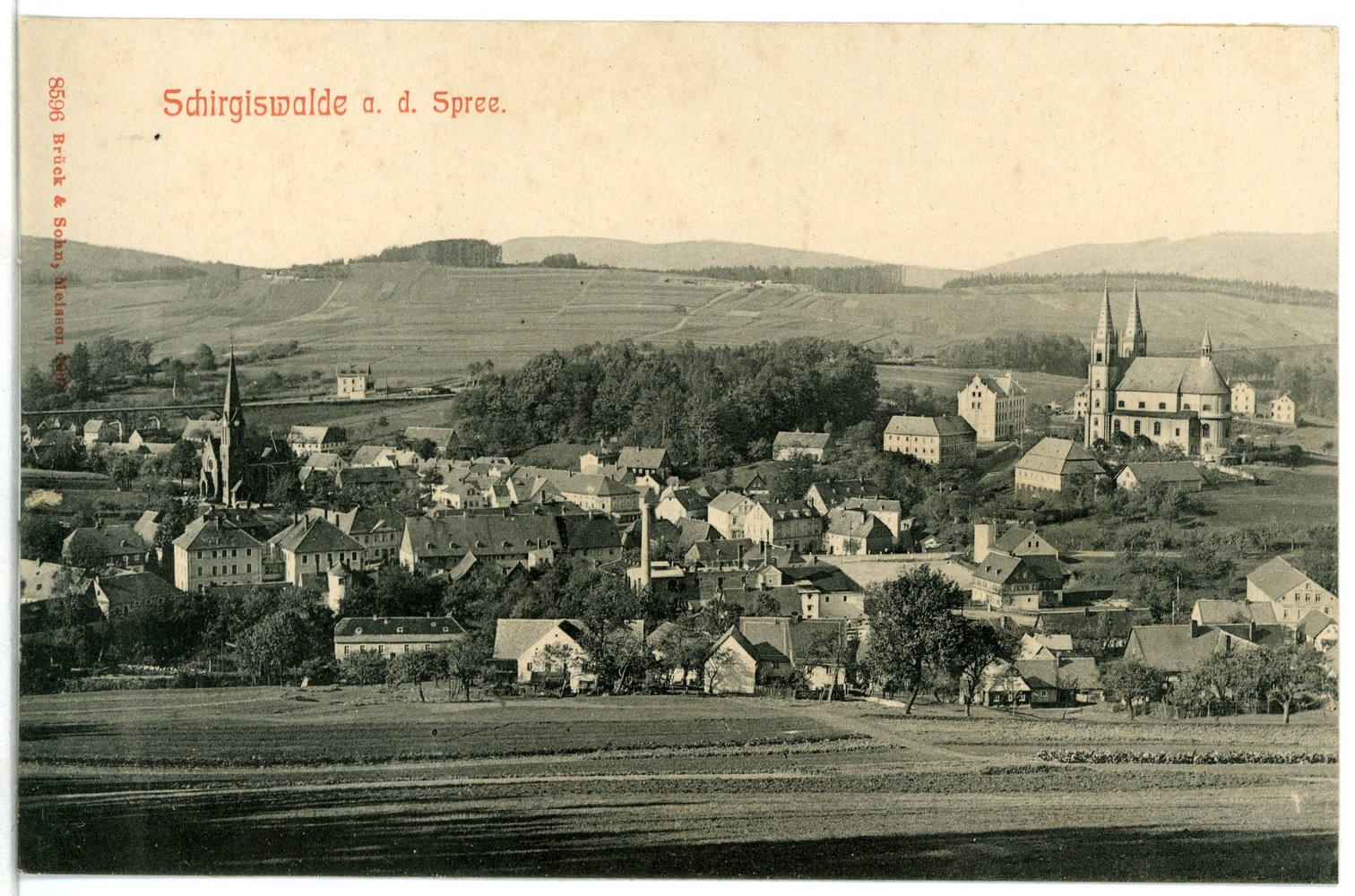
Postcard from 1907

The village of Schirgiswalde was first mentioned in a document from 1346, when it was part of the Bohemian Crown. During the Thirty Years' War, most of the settlement was destroyed with the majority of the populace perishing in the conflict. To aid the rebuilding and economic reconstruction of the community, the lord of the manor of Schirgiswalde made it a town in 1665. Later, the small town became part of the land owned by the Domstift in Bautzen, effectively turning it into a property of the church. Until the midst of the 19th century, it stayed under the regime and the right of the Domstift.

In 1635, the region of Upper Lusatia became part of Saxony, but Schirgiswalde/Šerachov still belonged to the Kingdom of Bohemia as an exclave. As a consequence to that, an influx of new settlers turned the town into a mostly Catholic settlement. This peculiar situation as a Bohemian island in Saxony continued until 1809, after which the diplomatic status of the town became unclear for a period of 36 years, as protracted diplomatic arguments between Saxony and Austria over a possible exchange of territories struggled to yield any tangible results, despite the Saxon army taking over the city as early as 1810. The subsequent power vacuum in the town was extensively exploited by robbers, thieves and political refugees. An official solution became even less likely in 1813, as war broke out once more with Saxony and Austria finding themselves on opposing sides. It ultimately took until 1845 to resolve the conflict, with Schirgiswalde finally becoming part of the Kingdom of Saxony. In 1871, it became part of the German Empire. After Germany's defeat in World War II, it formed part of East Germany from 1949 until 1990.

On January 1, 2011, the town of Schirgiswalde joined the municipalities of Kirschau and Crostau to form the new town of Schirgiswalde-Kirschau.

== Museums and sights ==
The municipal museum can be found near the main street and near the park of the town. It offers an overview over all typical handicrafts and some archaeological findings and documents concerning the history of the town. It is also possible to take a look at the old tapestry-room belonging to the old manor of the Domstift. In the baroque catholic church upon a hill in the inner city some old figures and a so-called Eule-organ can be found. Like in other villages and towns of the southern Upper Lusatia the typical Umgebindehäuser are some of the most important sights in Schirgiswalde.
