= Bernhard Günther =

German politician (1906–1981)

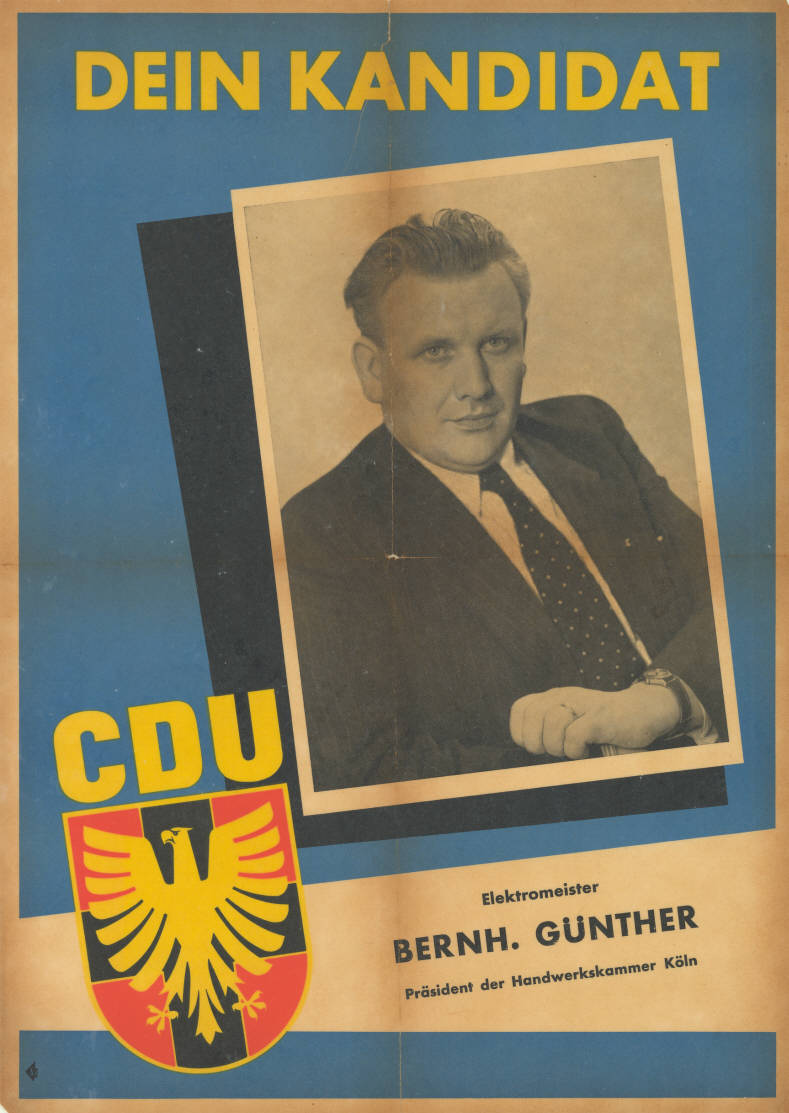
- Candidate poster Bernhard Günthers for the Federal Elections of 1953

Member of the Bundestag
- In office 7 September 1949 – 17 October 1965

Personal details
- Born: 4 November 1906 Koblenz
- Died: 31 October 1981 (aged 74) Köln, North Rhine-Westphalia, Germany
- Party: CDU

Bernhard Günther (November 4, 1906 – October 31, 1981) was a German politician of the Christian Democratic Union (CDU) and former member of the German Bundestag.

== Life ==
In 1945 he was a co-founder of the CDU in Cologne.

Since 1947, Günther was a city councillor in Cologne, in 1948 he was elected by the state parliament to the economic council of the Bizone. Günther was a member of the German Bundestag from its first election in 1949 to 1965. He was always directly elected to parliament in the constituency of Düren-Monschau-Schleiden. Günther was a member of the Bundestag's finance and transport committees.

== Literature ==
Herbst, Ludolf; Jahn, Bruno (2002). Vierhaus, Rudolf (ed.). Biographisches Handbuch der Mitglieder des Deutschen Bundestages. 1949–2002 [Biographical Handbook of the Members of the German Bundestag. 1949–2002] (in German). München: De Gruyter - De Gruyter Saur. p. 1715. ISBN 978-3-11-184511-1.

== See also ==
- Media related to Bernhard Günther (politician) at Wikimedia Commons
