= Lärchenberg =

Mountain in Germany

Coordinates: 51°05′26″N 14°38′17″E

Highest point
- Elevation: 330.8 m (1,085 ft)

Geography
- Location: Saxony, Germany

Lärchenberg (330.8 m) is a mountain of Saxony, Germany. It is located in the Upper Lusatian Highlands, southwest of Löbau.
