= Kirschau =

- Ortsteil of Schirgiswalde-Kirschau
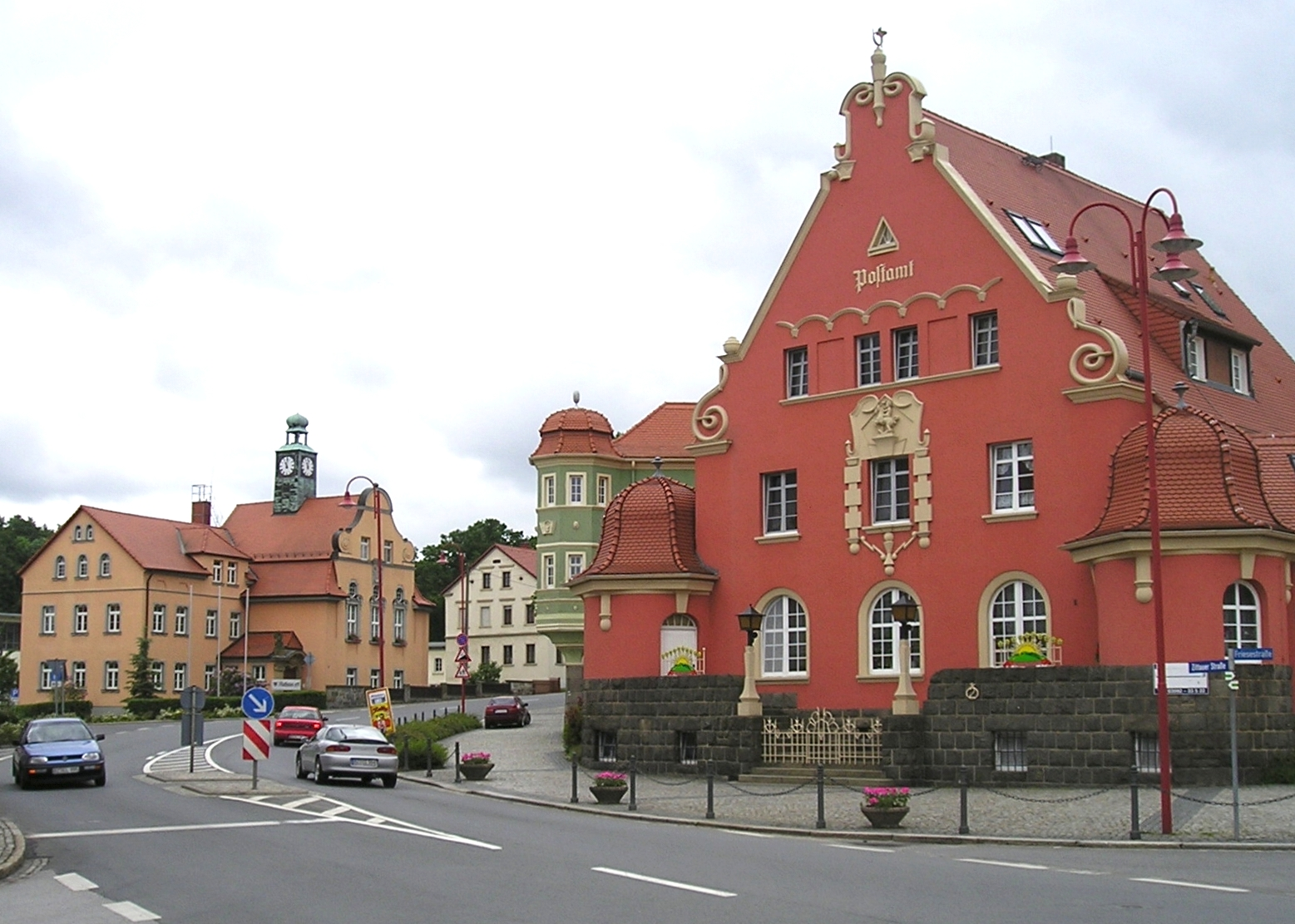
- Town hall (left) and post office (right)

- Coat of arms
- Interactive map of Kirschau
- Location within Germany Location within Saxony
- Coordinates: 51°6′N 14°25′E
- Country: Germany
- State: Saxony
- District: Bautzen
- Town: Schirgiswalde-Kirschau

Area
  - Total: 6.52 km^{2} (2.52 sq mi)
- Elevation: 250 m (820 ft)

Population (2009-12-31)
  - Total: 2,442
  - Density: 375/km^{2} (970/sq mi)
- Time zone: UTC+01:00 (CET)
  - Summer (DST): UTC+02:00 (CEST)
- Postal codes: 02681
- Dialling codes: 03592 (035938 in Bederwitz, Rodewitz und Sonnenberg)
- Vehicle registration: BZ
- Website: www.kirschau.de

Kirschau (German pronunciation: [ˈkɪʁʃaʊ]; Upper Sorbian: Korzym, pronounced [ˈkɔʁzɨm]) is a village and a former municipality in Upper Lusatia in the district of Bautzen in Saxony in Germany. Since 1 January 2011, it is part of the town Schirgiswalde-Kirschau. It is situated in a region called Lausitzer Bergland in the valley of the Spree and the Pilke, between the "Mönchswalderberg" (449 m) and the "Lärchenberg" (354 m) and belongs in respects of administration to the district of Bautzen.

The community is separated into four different parts called (with the sorbian name additional): Bederwitz (Bjedrusk), Kleinpostwitz (Bójswecy), Rodewitz (Rozwodecy) and Sonnenberg (Słónčna Hora).

== History ==
In the document that tells about the destruction of the castle "Körse" the community of Kirschau first has been mentioned in 1352 in a written source. When Upper Lusatia became a part of the Electorate of Saxony in 1634, at the time of the Thirty-years-war, Kirschau became a village near the border. A tax station was opened because of the near border to Bohemia. From 1806 to 1918 Kirschau was part of the Kingdom of Saxony. Until 1845 Kirschau was a poor and unimportant village, but helped by Gotthelf August Friese industry started to develop in this small village - especially the textile industry. Other industries followed and because of its richness the community acquired the name "Village of the Golden Roofs" - some of the old wealth is still visible in the core of the village and in the fine houses of the rich men. After the second world-war in the time of the GDR most enterprises became VEB, meaning they now belonged to the newly born communist state of East Germany. At this time the production of textile products remained important - as did the production of agricultural machines in the "Kombinat Fortschritt Landmaschinen Neustadt. Since reunification just a small proportion of the former textile industry remains in the region. Today a big bath called "Körse-Therme" which can be used every season is the main attraction in the village.

== Culture and sights ==
In the village there can be found two museum, one shows the history of the castle "Körse" and the village, the other one shows the rural tradition and old handicraft of the region.

The most important monuments are the ruins of the castle "Körse", the church of St. John (built in 1924 in Jugendstil) and the houses of the inner city in the same style.
