= Cologne I =

Federal electoral district of Germany

92 Cologne I
- Electoral district for the Bundestag
- Cologne I in 2025
- State: North Rhine-Westphalia
- Population: 297,600 (2019)
- Electorate: 190,630 (2021)
- Major settlements: Cologne (partial)
- Area: 128.3 km^{2}

Current electoral district
- Created: 1949
- Party: SPD
- Member: Sanae Abdi
- Elected: 2021, 2025

Cologne I (German: Köln I) is an electoral constituency (German: Wahlkreis) represented in the Bundestag. It elects one member via first-past-the-post voting. Under the current constituency numbering system, it is designated as constituency 92. It is located in western North Rhine-Westphalia, comprising the southeastern part of the city of Cologne.

Cologne I was created for the inaugural 1949 federal election. Since 2021, it has been represented by Sanae Abdi of the Social Democratic Party (SPD).

== Geography ==
Cologne I is located in western North Rhine-Westphalia. As of the 2021 federal election, it comprises the southeastern part of the independent city of Cologne, specifically the districts of Porz, Kalk, and the Stadtteile of Altstadt-Nord, Deutz, and Neustadt-Nord from Innenstadt.

== History ==
Cologne I was created in 1949. In the 1949 election, it was North Rhine-Westphalia constituency 7 in the numbering system. From 1953 through 1961, it was number 66. From 1965 through 1998, it was number 59. From 2002 through 2009, it was number 94. In the 2013 through 2021 elections, it was number 93. From the 2025 election, it has been number 92.

Originally, the constituency comprised the area of Cologne on the left bank of the Rhine and north of the line made by Aachener Straße and Innere Kanalstraße. In the 1965 through 1976 elections, it comprised today's Innenstadt district as well as Kalk, Humboldt-Gremberg, and Poll. In the 1980 through 1998 elections, it comprised Innenstadt and Porz. It acquired its current borders in the 2002 election.

Election	No.	Name	Borders
1949	7	Köln I	Cologne city (only the area on the left bank of the Rhine and north of the line made by Aachener Straße and Innere Kanalstraße)
1953	66	Köln I	Cologne city (only the area on the left bank of the Rhine and north of the line made by Aachener Straße and Innere Kanalstraße)
1957	66	Köln I	Cologne city (only the area on the left bank of the Rhine and north of the line made by Aachener Straße and Innere Kanalstraße)
1961	66	Köln I	Cologne city (only the area on the left bank of the Rhine and north of the line made by Aachener Straße and Innere Kanalstraße)
1965	59	Köln I	Cologne city (only Innenstadt, Kalk, Humboldt-Gremberg, and Poll districts)
1969	59	Köln I	Cologne city (only Innenstadt, Kalk, Humboldt-Gremberg, and Poll districts)
1972	59	Köln I	Cologne city (only Innenstadt, Kalk, Humboldt-Gremberg, and Poll districts)
1976	59	Köln I	Cologne city (only Innenstadt, Kalk, Humboldt-Gremberg, and Poll districts)
1980	59	Köln I	Cologne city (only Porz and Innenstadt districts)
1983	59	Köln I	Cologne city (only Porz and Innenstadt districts)
1987	59	Köln I	Cologne city (only Porz and Innenstadt districts)
1990	59	Köln I	Cologne city (only Porz and Innenstadt districts)
1994	59	Köln I	Cologne city (only Porz and Innenstadt districts)
1998	59	Köln I	Cologne city (only Porz and Innenstadt districts)
2002	94	Köln I	Cologne city (only Porz and Kalk districts and Altstadt-Nord, Deutz, and Neustadt-Nord Stadtteile from Innenstadt district)
2005	94	Köln I	Cologne city (only Porz and Kalk districts and Altstadt-Nord, Deutz, and Neustadt-Nord Stadtteile from Innenstadt district)
2009	94	Köln I	Cologne city (only Porz and Kalk districts and Altstadt-Nord, Deutz, and Neustadt-Nord Stadtteile from Innenstadt district)
2013	93	Köln I	Cologne city (only Porz and Kalk districts and Altstadt-Nord, Deutz, and Neustadt-Nord Stadtteile from Innenstadt district)
2017	93	Köln I	Cologne city (only Porz and Kalk districts and Altstadt-Nord, Deutz, and Neustadt-Nord Stadtteile from Innenstadt district)
2021	93	Köln I	Cologne city (only Porz and Kalk districts and Altstadt-Nord, Deutz, and Neustadt-Nord Stadtteile from Innenstadt district)
2025	92	Köln I	Cologne city (only Porz and Kalk districts and Altstadt-Nord, Deutz, and Neustadt-Nord Stadtteile from Innenstadt district)

== Members ==
The constituency was first represented by Aenne Brauksiepe of the Christian Democratic Union (CDU) from 1949 to 1965. It was won by the Social Democratic Party (SPD)'s candidate Hans-Jürgen Wischnewski in 1965. The SPD held the constituency until 2017. Wischnewski represented it until 1990, when he was succeeded by Walter Rempe, who served a single term. Volkmar Schultz was elected in 1994 and served until 2002, followed by Martin Dörmann. Karsten Möring of the CDU was elected in 2017. Sanae Abdi regained the constituency for the SPD in 2021 and was subsequently reelected in 2025.

Election	Member	Party	%
1949	Aenne Brauksiepe	CDU	42.2
1953	Aenne Brauksiepe	CDU	53.5
1957	Aenne Brauksiepe	CDU	58.4
1961	Aenne Brauksiepe	CDU	50.0
1965	Hans-Jürgen Wischnewski	SPD	46.0
1969	Hans-Jürgen Wischnewski	SPD	54.1
1972	Hans-Jürgen Wischnewski	SPD	58.5
1976	Hans-Jürgen Wischnewski	SPD	52.5
1980	Hans-Jürgen Wischnewski	SPD	50.5
1983	Hans-Jürgen Wischnewski	SPD	48.9
1987	Hans-Jürgen Wischnewski	SPD	47.3
1990	Walter Rempe	SPD	45.2
1994	Volkmar Schultz	SPD	45.0
1998	Volkmar Schultz	SPD	51.6
2002	Martin Dörmann	SPD	50.0
2005	Martin Dörmann	SPD	48.6
2009	Martin Dörmann	SPD	35.0
2013	Martin Dörmann	SPD	37.0
2017	Karsten Möring	CDU	31.6
2021	Sanae Abdi	SPD	27.9
2025	Sanae Abdi	SPD	24.9

== Election results ==
=== 2025 election ===
Federal election (2025): Cologne I
Notes:	Blue background denotes the winner of the electorate vote. Pink background denotes a candidate elected from their party list. Yellow background denotes an electorate win by a list member, or other incumbent. A ✓ or ✗ denotes status of any incumbent, win or lose respectively.						
Party	Candidate	Votes	%	±%	Party votes	%	±%
SPD	✓ Sanae Abdi	37,717	24.9	▼3.0	29,775	19.6	▼6.8
CDU	Serap Güler	37,261	23.6	▲2.0	33,934	22.3	▲2.5
Greens	Roman Schulte	30,496	20.1	▼3.8	27,273	17.9	▼6.0
AfD	Fabian Jacobi	20,022	12.2	▲6.9	18,853	12.4	▲6.4
Left	Kalle Gerigk	16,894	11.1	▲6.0	22,716	14.9	▲9.0
BSW					7,170	4.7	
FDP	Fardad Hooghoughi	4,672	3.1	▼5.1	6,409	4.2	▼6.5
Volt	Mihir Nayak	2,698	1.8	▲0.1	1,671	1.1	▲0.1
Tierschutzpartei					1,598	1.0	▼0.2
FW	Dominik Meißner	1,488	1.0	▲0.2	580	0.4	▼0.2
PARTEI				▼2.0	851	0.6	▼0.6
MLPD	Elisabeth Höchtl	347	0.2	▲0.1	96	0.1	0.0
Team Todenhöfer					344	0.2	▼0.2
PdF					310	0.2	▲
dieBasis				▼1.2	297	0.2	▼0.8
BD					181	0.1	
MERA25					125	0.1	
Values					50	0.0	
Pirates							▼0.4
Humanists							▼0.1
Gesundheitsforschung							▼0.1
ÖDP							▼0.1
Bündnis C							▼0.1
SGP							0.0
Informal votes		1,515			877		
Total valid votes		151,595			152,233		
Turnout		153,110	80.2	▲6.3			
SPD hold	Majority	456	1.3				

=== 2021 election ===
Federal election (2021): Cologne I
Notes:	Blue background denotes the winner of the electorate vote. Pink background denotes a candidate elected from their party list. Yellow background denotes an electorate win by a list member, or other incumbent. A ✓ or ✗ denotes status of any incumbent, win or lose respectively.						
Party	Candidate	Votes	%	±%	Party votes	%	±%
SPD	Sanae Abdi	38,985	27.9	▼3.1	36,933	26.4	▲2.1
Greens	Lisa-Marie Friede	33,405	23.9	▲14.1	33,501	23.9	▲12.5
CDU	✗ Karsten Möring	31,636	22.6	▼9.0	27,695	19.8	▼6.6
FDP	Reinhard Houben	11,490	8.2	▲0.5	15,040	10.7	▼2.3
AfD	Fabian Jacobi	8,789	6.3	▼2.4	8,363	6.0	▼2.9
Left	Madeine Eisfeld	7,213	5.2	▼3.5	8,267	5.9	▼5.1
Team Todenhöfer					1,768	1.3	
Tierschutzpartei					1,704	1.2	▲0.4
PARTEI	Aaron Baron von Kruedener	2,768	2.0	▼0.5	1,607	1.1	▼0.2
Volt	Rebekka Müller	2,353	1.7		1,340	1.0	
dieBasis	Ralf Schäfer	1,615	1.2		1,327	0.9	
FW	Detlef Hagenbruch	1,108	0.8		753	0.5	▲0.3
Pirates					548	0.4	▼0.1
Independent	Martin Przybylski	261	0.2				
LIEBE					173	0.1	
Humanists					152	0.1	0.0
Gesundheitsforschung					127	0.1	0.0
du.					116	0.1	
V-Partei3					109	0.1	▼0.1
LfK					105	0.1	
ÖDP					88	0.1	▼0.1
NPD					76	0.1	▼0.1
Bündnis C					72	0.1	
PdF					67	0.0	
MLPD	Elisabeth Höchtl	181	0.1	▼0.1	64	0.0	▼0.1
DKP					43	0.0	0.0
LKR					27	0.0	
SGP					15	0.0	0.0
Informal votes		1,097			821		
Total valid votes		139,804			140,080		
Turnout		140,901	73.9	▲1.4			
SPD gain from CDU	Majority	5,580	4.0				

=== 2017 election ===
Federal election (2017): Cologne I
Notes:	Blue background denotes the winner of the electorate vote. Pink background denotes a candidate elected from their party list. Yellow background denotes an electorate win by a list member, or other incumbent. A ✓ or ✗ denotes status of any incumbent, win or lose respectively.						
Party	Candidate	Votes	%	±%	Party votes	%	±%
CDU	Karsten Möring	43,683	31.6	▼5.1	36,565	26.4	▼7.0
SPD	✗ Martin Dörmann	42,799	31.0	▼6.0	33,666	24.3	▼6.7
Greens	Hans Schwanitz	13,535	9.8	▼0.5	15,800	11.4	▼0.8
AfD	Fabian Jacobi	11,952	8.6	▲5.7	12,290	8.9	▲4.8
Left	Murat Yilmaz	11,898	8.6	▲2.1	15,271	11.0	▲2.9
FDP	Reinhard Houben	10,652	7.7	▲5.2	18,067	13.0	▲7.5
PARTEI	Sabine Kader	3,369	2.4		1,905	1.4	▲0.7
Tierschutzpartei					1,068	0.8	
AD-DEMOKRATEN					970	0.7	
Pirates					689	0.5	▼2.2
DiB					398	0.3	
FW					356	0.3	0.0
BGE					233	0.2	
NPD					224	0.2	▼0.6
V-Partei³					184	0.1	
ÖDP					164	0.1	0.0
MLPD	Reiner Dworschak	308	0.2		155	0.1	▲0.1
Die Humanisten					150	0.1	
Gesundheitsforschung					146	0.1	
DM					140	0.1	
Volksabstimmung					136	0.1	▼0.1
DKP					38	0.0	
SGP					16	0.0	0.0
Informal votes		1,522			1,087		
Total valid votes		138,196			138,631		
Turnout		139,718	72.6	▲3.1			
CDU gain from SPD	Majority	884	0.6				

=== 2013 election ===
Federal election (2013): Cologne I
Notes:	Blue background denotes the winner of the electorate vote. Pink background denotes a candidate elected from their party list. Yellow background denotes an electorate win by a list member, or other incumbent. A ✓ or ✗ denotes status of any incumbent, win or lose respectively.						
Party	Candidate	Votes	%	±%	Party votes	%	±%
SPD	✓ Martin Dörmann	48,632	37.0	▲2.0	40,759	31.0	▲4.1
CDU	Karsten Möring	48,232	36.7	▲3.1	43,863	33.3	▲6.2
Greens	Berivan Aymaz	13,513	10.3	▼2.1	16,056	12.2	▼3.7
Left	Heinz Peter Karl Fischer	8,583	6.5	▼1.9	10,709	8.1	▼1.5
AfD	Hendrik Rottmann	3,885	3.0		5,367	4.1	
Pirates	Gerald Günther Teybig	3,361	2.6		3,501	2.7	▲0.7
FDP	Stefanie Ruffen	3,243	2.5	▼6.2	7,235	5.5	▼9.6
NPD	Melanie Händelkes	1,329	1.0	▼0.6	1,032	0.8	▼0.3
PARTEI					883	0.7	
FW	Christine-Maria Hudyma	444	0.3		337	0.3	
PRO					411	0.3	
BIG					254	0.2	
Nichtwahler					241	0.2	
Volksabstimmung					208	0.2	0.0
ÖDP					204	0.2	0.0
REP					168	0.1	▼0.2
Party of Reason					111	0.1	
RRP					80	0.1	▼0.1
MLPD					73	0.1	0.0
BüSo	Tamas Antal Bech	170	0.1		61	0.0	0.0
PSG					31	0.0	0.0
Die Rechte					18	0.0	
Informal votes		1,445			1,235		
Total valid votes		131,392			131,602		
Turnout		132,837	69.4	▲1.5			
SPD hold	Majority	400	0.3	▼1.1			

=== 2009 election ===
Federal election (2009): Cologne I
Notes:	Blue background denotes the winner of the electorate vote. Pink background denotes a candidate elected from their party list. Yellow background denotes an electorate win by a list member, or other incumbent. A ✓ or ✗ denotes status of any incumbent, win or lose respectively.						
Party	Candidate	Votes	%	±%	Party votes	%	±%
SPD	✓ Martin Dörmann	43,837	35.0	▼13.6	33,774	26.8	▼12.8
CDU	Ursula Heinen-Esser	42,094	33.6	▼0.3	34,195	27.2	0.0
Greens	Max Löffler	15,557	12.4	▲5.1	20,019	15.9	▲2.6
FDP	Alexander Vogel	10,902	8.7	▲4.7	18,981	15.1	▲4.0
Left	Cindy Kolter	10,614	8.5	▲3.5	12,092	9.6	▲3.5
Pirates					2,522	2.0	
NPD	Benedikt Frings	1,971	1.6	▲0.6	1,398	1.1	▲0.3
Tierschutzpartei					816	0.6	▲0.2
RENTNER					454	0.4	
FAMILIE					433	0.3	0.0
REP					368	0.3	0.0
Independent	Mali Dieckmann	318	0.3				
RRP					214	0.2	
Volksabstimmung					179	0.1	0.0
ÖDP					146	0.1	
Centre					74	0.1	0.0
MLPD					70	0.1	0.0
DVU					53	0.0	
BüSo					25	0.0	0.0
PSG					20	0.0	▼0.1
Informal votes		1,718			1,178		
Total valid votes		125,293			125,833		
Turnout		127,011	68.0	▼6.5			
SPD hold	Majority	1,743	1.4	▼13.3			

=== 2005 election ===
Federal election (2005): Cologne I
Notes:	Blue background denotes the winner of the electorate vote. Pink background denotes a candidate elected from their party list. Yellow background denotes an electorate win by a list member, or other incumbent. A ✓ or ✗ denotes status of any incumbent, win or lose respectively.						
Party	Candidate	Votes	%	±%	Party votes	%	±%
SPD	✓ Martin Dörmann	66,317	48.6	▼1.4	54,131	39.6	▼3.3
CDU	Ursula Heinen-Esser	46,224	33.9	▲1.5	37,104	27.1	▼9.3
Greens	Max Löffler	9,992	7.3	▼1.8	18,127	13.3	▼9.3
Left	Cindy Kolter	6,717	4.9	▲3.3	8,340	6.1	▲4.2
FDP	Alexander Vogel	5,516	4.0	▼1.4	15,085	11.0	▲2.4
NPD					1,079	0.8	▲0.5
GRAUEN					912	0.7	▲0.3
Tierschutzpartei					591	0.4	▲0.1
REP					411	0.3	▼0.1
Familie					405	0.3	▲0.2
Independent	Mali Dieckmann	404	0.3				
From Now on... Democracy Through Referendum					157	0.1	
PBC					105	0.1	
Socialist Equality Party					91	0.1	
BüSo					38	0.0	
Centre					47	0.0	
MLPD					61	0.0	0.0
Informal votes		708			480		
Total valid votes		136,456			136,684		
Turnout		137,164	74.5	▼1.2			
SPD hold	Majority	20,093	14.7				
