= Serap Güler =

German politician (born 1980)

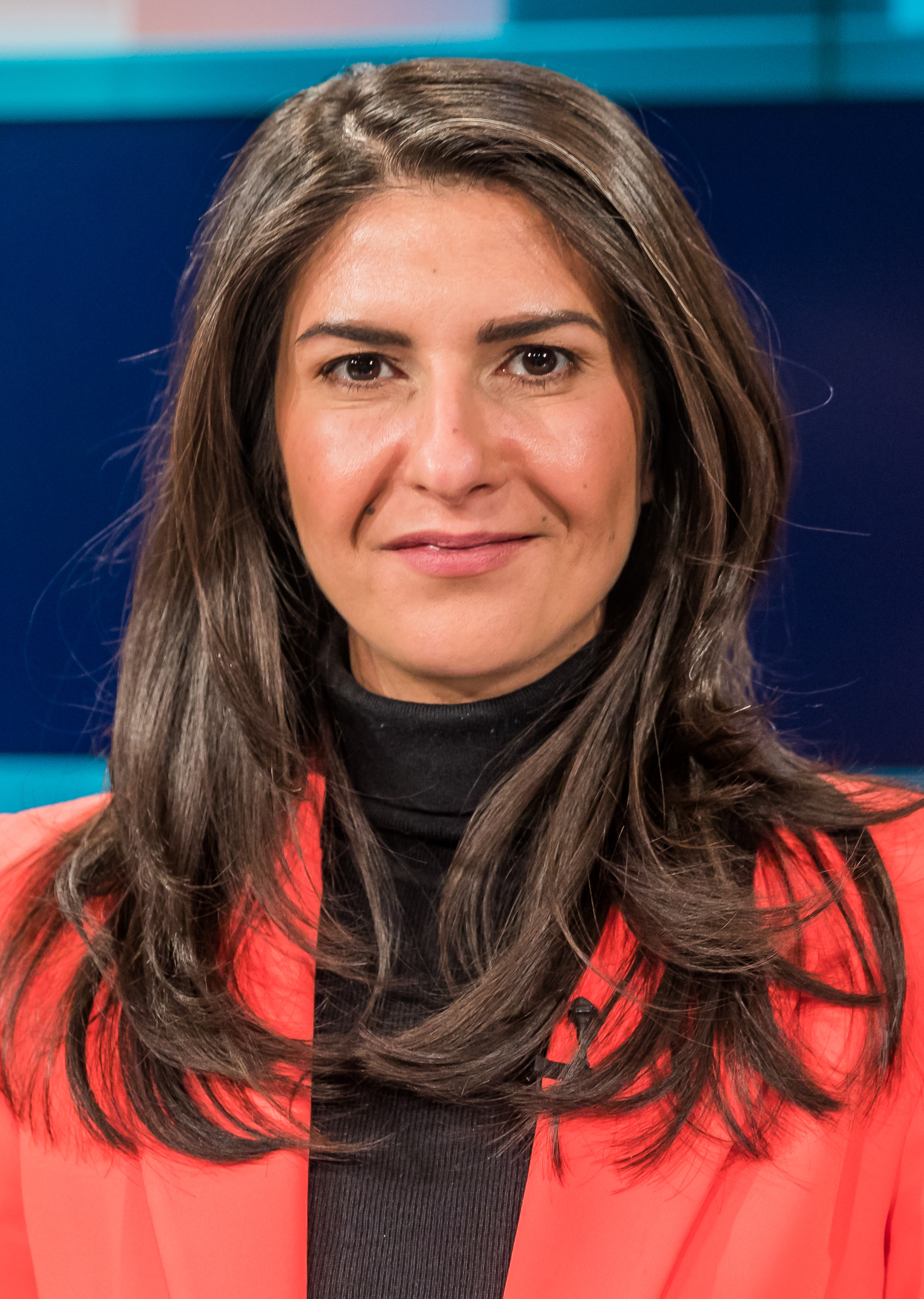
- Güler in 2024

Member of the Bundestag
- Incumbent
- Assumed office 26 September 2021
- Constituency: North Rhine-Westphalia

Member of the Landtag of North Rhine-Westphalia
- In office 13 May 2012 – 26 September 2021

Personal details
- Born: 7 July 1980 (age 46) Marl, West Germany (now Germany)
- Party: CDU (since 2009)
- Education: University of Duisburg-Essen

Serap Güler (born 7 July 1980) is a German politician of the Christian Democratic Union (CDU) who has been serving as a Member of the German Bundestag since 2021, representing the Leverkusen – Cologne IV district.

In addition to her work in parliament, Güler has been serving as Minister of State at the Federal Foreign Office in the government of Chancellor Friedrich Merz since 2025.

== Early life and career ==
Güler grew up as the child of Turkish guest workers in Germany. After training as a hotel manager, she graduated in communication studies and German studies from University of Duisburg-Essen.

Upon graduation, Güler worked as advisor to State Minister for Generations, Family, Women and Integration Armin Laschet and State Minister of Health Barbara Steffens.

== Political career ==
Güler was elected to the Landtag of North Rhine-Westphalia in the 2012 North Rhine-Westphalia state election; at the time, she was her parliamentary group's first member of Turkish origin. From 2012 until 2017, she served as her parliamentary group's spokesperson on integration.

In 2015, Güler was part of a CDU working group on a reform of Germany's legislation on immigration, chaired by Armin Laschet. Together with Thomas Strobl, Peter Hintze, Michael Kretschmer, David McAllister, Christina Schwarzer and Annette Widmann-Mauz, she co-chaired the CDU's 2015 national convention in Karlsruhe.

Following the 2017 state elections, Güler was appointed State Secretary of Integration at the State Ministry for Children, Families, Refugees, and Integration, in the cabinet of Minister-President Armin Laschet. In the negotiations to form a fourth coalition government under Chancellor Angela Merkel following the 2017 federal elections, she was part of the working group on migration policy, led by Volker Bouffier, Joachim Herrmann and Ralf Stegner.

=== Member of the German Parliament, 2021–present ===
In the 2021 German federal election, Güler contested Leverkusen – Cologne IV but came second to Karl Lauterbach. She was elected to the Bundestag on the state list. She has since been serving on the Defence Committee. She also joined a study commission set up to investigate the entire period of German involvement in Afghanistan from 2001 to 2021 and to draw lessons for foreign and security policy in future.

From 2022 to 2024, Güler served as deputy chair – alongside Mario Voigt – of a working group in charge of drafting the CDU's new party platform, under the leadership of Carsten Linnemann.

In the negotiations to form a coalition government under the leadership of Minister-President of North Rhine-Westphalia Hendrik Wüst following the 2022 state elections, Güler was part of her party's delegation.

In the 2025 German federal election, Güler was a direct candidate in Cologne I and achieved 23.6% of the first vote narrowly coming second to Sanae Abdi who got 24.9%.

Since April 2025, Güler has been the chairwoman of the CDU in Cologne; she is the first woman to hold that position.

== Political positions ==
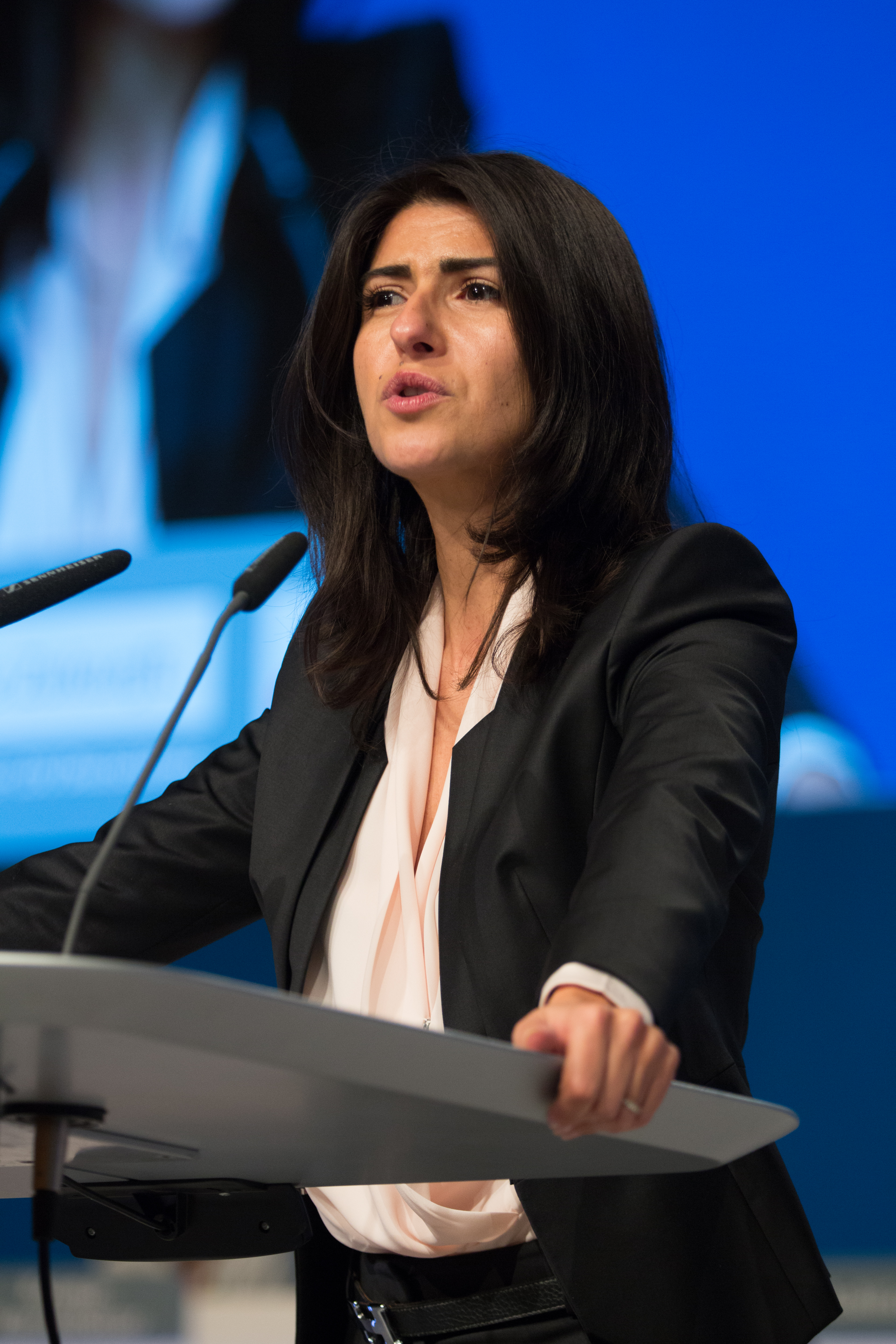
Güler in 2016

Güler is a part of the social wing of the CDU, and is a member of the Christian Democratic Employees' Association.

As a practising Muslim, Güler opposes abortion. She opposes children being forced to wear hijab.

Güler is a critic of President of Turkey Recep Tayyip Erdoğan.

== Other activities ==
- Islamkolleg Deutschland (IKD), Member of the Board of Trustees
- Institute for European Politics (IEP), Member of the Board of Trustees
- Otto Benecke Foundation, Member of the Board of Trustees
