= Karsten Möring =

German politician

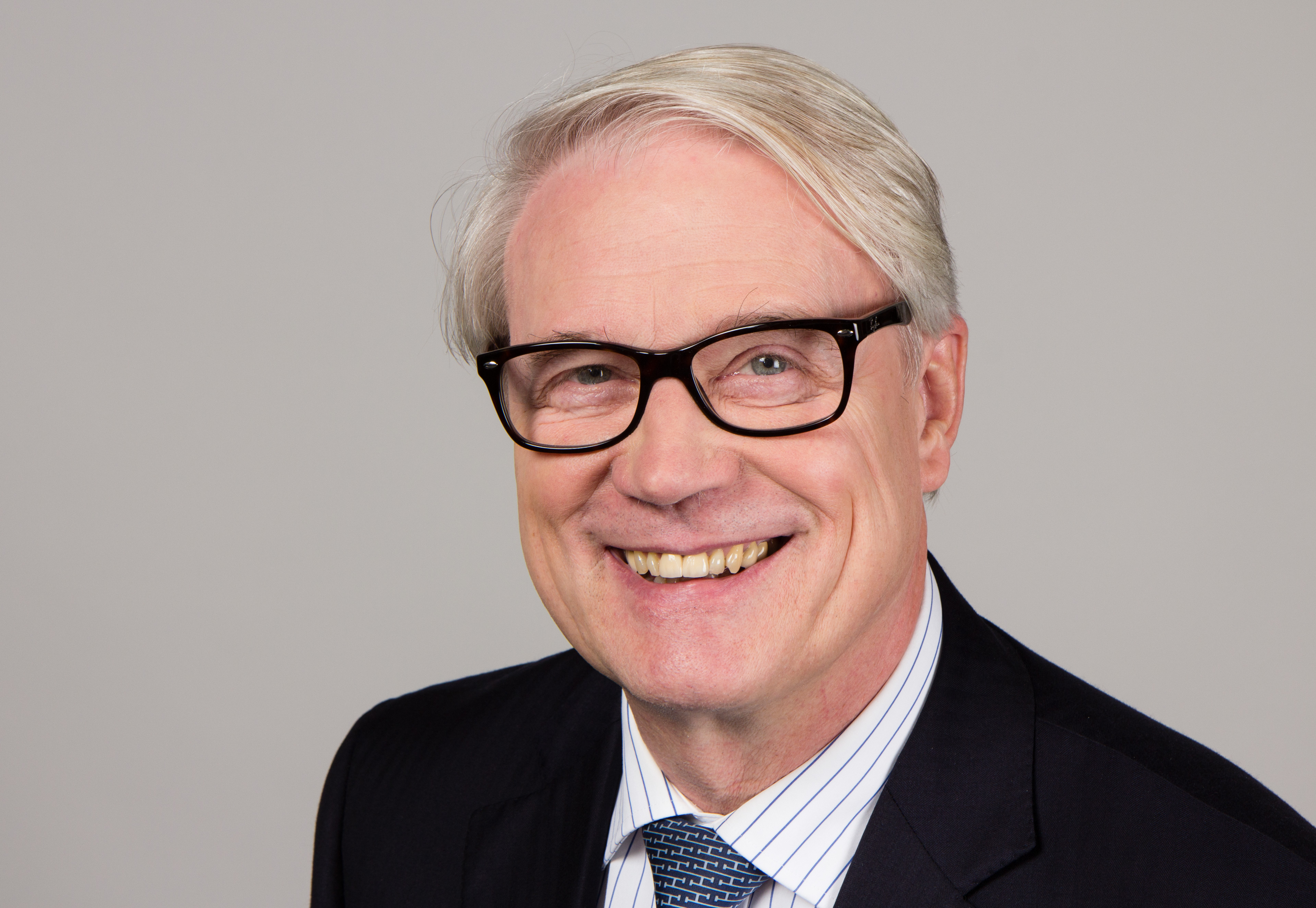
- in 2019

Member of the Bundestag for North Rhine-Westphalia
- In office 22 October 2013 – 26 October 2021
- Succeeded by: Sanae Abdi

Personal details
- Born: 30 August 1949 (age 76) Schneverdingen, West Germany (now Germany)
- Party: CDU

Karsten Möring (born 30 August 1949) is a German teacher and politician of the Christian Democratic Union (CDU) who served as a member of the Bundestag from the state of North Rhine-Westphalia from 2013 until 2021.

== Political career ==
Born in Schneverdingen, Lower Saxony, Möring became a member of the Bundestag in the 2013 German federal election, representing Cologne. He was a member of the Committee on Construction, Housing, Urban Development and Communities and the Committee on the Environment, Nature Conservation and Nuclear Safety.

He was elected in Cologne I in 2017, defeating Martin Dörmann from the SPD.
