= Leverkusen – Cologne IV =

Electoral constituency represented in the Bundestag in Germany

100 Leverkusen – Cologne IV
- Electoral district for the Bundestag
- Leverkusen – Cologne IV in 2025
- State: North Rhine-Westphalia
- Population: 313,500 (2019)
- Electorate: 209,102 (2021)
- Major settlements: Leverkusen; Cologne (partial)
- Area: 131.1 km^{2}

Current electoral district
- Created: 2002
- Party: SPD
- Member: Karl Lauterbach
- Elected: 2005, 2009, 2013, 2017, 2021, 2025

Leverkusen – Cologne IV (German: Leverkusen – Köln IV) is an electoral constituency (German: Wahlkreis) represented in the Bundestag. It elects one member via first-past-the-post voting. Under the current constituency numbering system, it is designated as constituency 100. It is located in western North Rhine-Westphalia, comprising the city of Leverkusen and the northeastern part of Cologne.

Leverkusen – Cologne IV was created for the 2002 federal election. Since 2005, it has been represented by Karl Lauterbach of the Social Democratic Party (SPD).

== Geography ==
Leverkusen – Cologne IV is located in western North Rhine-Westphalia. As of the 2021 federal election, it comprises the independent city of Leverkusen and the district of Mülheim from the independent city of Cologne.

== History ==
Leverkusen – Cologne IV was created in 2002 and contained parts of the abolished constituencies of Leverkusen – Rheinisch-Bergischer Kreis II and Köln IV. In the 2002 through 2009 elections, it was constituency 102 in the numbering system. In the 2013 through 2021 elections, it was number 101. From the 2025 election, it has been number 100.

== Members ==
The constituency was first represented by Ernst Küchler of the Social Democratic Party (SPD) from 2002 to 2005. He was succeeded by fellow SPD member Karl Lauterbach in the 2005 election. Lauterbach was re-elected in 2009, 2013, 2017, 2021, and 2025.

Election	Member	Party	%
2002	Ernst Küchler	SPD	50.0
2005	Karl Lauterbach	SPD	48.6
2009	Karl Lauterbach	SPD	37.1
2013	Karl Lauterbach	SPD	41.3
2017	Karl Lauterbach	SPD	38.7
2021	Karl Lauterbach	SPD	45.6
2025	Karl Lauterbach	SPD	32.7

== Election results ==
=== 2025 election ===
Federal election (2025): Leverkusen – Cologne IV
Notes:	Blue background denotes the winner of the electorate vote. Pink background denotes a candidate elected from their party list. Yellow background denotes an electorate win by a list member, or other incumbent. A ✓ or ✗ denotes status of any incumbent, win or lose respectively.						
Party	Candidate	Votes	%	±%	Party votes	%	±%
SPD	✓ Karl Lauterbach	53,574	32.7	▼12.9	34,871	21.2	▼7.9
CDU	Siegmar Heß	41,855	25.6	▲5.1	40,450	24.6	▲2.9
AfD	Yannick Noe	25,439	15.5	▲8.5	25,392	15.5	▲8.3
Greens	Nyke Slawik	18,081	11.0	▼0.3	23,355	14.2	▼5.0
Left	Vedat Akter	14,848	9.1	▲5.4	19,137	11.6	▲6.9
BSW					7,786	4.7	
FDP	Rolf Albach	5,102	3.1	▼4.1	6,418	3.9	▼6.5
Volt	Friedrich Jeschke	2,558	1.6		1,475	0.9	▲0.2
Tierschutzpartei					2,106	1.3	▼0.1
FW	Jörg Badura	1,984	1.2	▲0.2	695	0.4	▼0.2
PARTEI				▼1.8	1,100	0.7	▼0.7
Team Todenhöfer					409	0.2	▼0.8
dieBasis				▼1.5	364	0.2	▼0.9
MLPD	Reiner Dworschak	330	0.2	▲0.1	117	0.1	0.0
PdF					287	0.2	▲0.1
BD					169	0.1	
Values					103	0.1	
MERA25					100	0.1	
Pirates							▼0.4
Gesundheitsforschung					216	0.1	▲0.1
Humanists							▼0.1
ÖDP							▼0.1
Bündnis C							▼0.1
SGP						0.0	0.0
Informal votes		1,595			1,032		
Total valid votes		163,771			163,334		
Turnout		165,366	80.2	▲6.4			
SPD hold	Majority	11,719	7.1				

=== 2021 election ===
Federal election (2021): Leverkusen – Cologne IV
Notes:	Blue background denotes the winner of the electorate vote. Pink background denotes a candidate elected from their party list. Yellow background denotes an electorate win by a list member, or other incumbent. A ✓ or ✗ denotes status of any incumbent, win or lose respectively.						
Party	Candidate	Votes	%	±%	Party votes	%	±%
SPD	✓ Karl Lauterbach	69,662	45.6	▲6.9	44,586	29.1	▲2.0
CDU	Serap Güler	31,197	20.4	▼10.4	33,246	21.7	▼6.4
Greens	Nyke Slawik	17,290	11.3	▲5.6	29,329	19.2	▲10.4
FDP	Cornelia Besser	11,050	7.2	▲0.6	15,931	10.4	▼1.8
AfD	Christer Cremer	10,797	7.1	▼1.7	10,966	7.2	▼2.6
Left	Beate Hane-Knoll	5,657	3.7	▼2.4	7,318	4.8	▼4.5
Tierschutzpartei					2,081	1.4	▲0.6
PARTEI	Frauke Petzold	2,782	1.8	▼0.8	2,076	1.4	0.0
dieBasis	Dirk Sattelmaier	2,222	1.5		1,715	1.1	
Team Todenhöfer					1,669	1.1	
Volt					996	0.7	
FW	Stephan Heintze	1,479	1.0		918	0.6	▲0.4
Pirates					664	0.4	▼0.1
Independent	Jacqueline Blum	412	0.3				
Gesundheitsforschung					216	0.1	▲0.1
LIEBE					195	0.1	
LfK					149	0.1	
V-Partei3					139	0.1	0.0
Humanists					124	0.1	0.0
NPD					123	0.1	▼0.1
ÖDP					112	0.1	0.0
Bündnis C					100	0.1	
du.					98	0.1	
MLPD	Jonathan Meier	212	0.1	▼0.1	96	0.1	▼0.1
PdF					57	0.0	
LKR					36	0.0	
DKP					36	0.0	0.0
SGP					24	0.0	0.0
Informal votes		1,403			1,163		
Total valid votes		152,760			153,000		
Turnout		154,163	73.7	▲0.6			
SPD hold	Majority	38,465	25.2	▲17.3			

=== 2017 election ===
Federal election (2017): Leverkusen – Cologne IV
Notes:	Blue background denotes the winner of the electorate vote. Pink background denotes a candidate elected from their party list. Yellow background denotes an electorate win by a list member, or other incumbent. A ✓ or ✗ denotes status of any incumbent, win or lose respectively.						
Party	Candidate	Votes	%	±%	Party votes	%	±%
SPD	✓ Karl Lauterbach	59,373	38.7	▼2.7	41,671	27.1	▼5.6
CDU	Helmut Nowak	47,272	30.8	▼8.5	43,175	28.1	▼7.5
AfD	Günter Theodor Witzmann	13,408	8.7		14,970	9.7	▲5.8
FDP	Rolf William Albach	10,114	6.6	▲4.3	18,719	12.2	▲7.3
Left	Beate Hane-Knoll	9,430	6.1	▲0.4	14,284	9.3	▲2.1
Greens	Lisa-Marie Friede	8,722	5.7	▼1.5	13,472	8.8	▼0.9
PARTEI	Mark Benecke	3,990	2.6	▲1.6	2,102	1.4	▲0.7
Tierschutzpartei					1,153	0.8	
AD-DEMOKRATEN					1,007	0.7	
Independent	Daniel Werner	861	0.6				
Pirates					774	0.5	▼2.1
FW					373	0.2	▼0.2
NPD					352	0.2	▼0.8
DiB					265	0.2	
MLPD	Ernst Albert Herbert	350	0.2	0.0	207	0.1	0.0
V-Partei³					194	0.1	
Volksabstimmung					192	0.1	▼0.1
BGE					176	0.1	
DM					164	0.1	
ÖDP					155	0.1	0.0
Gesundheitsforschung					126	0.1	
Die Humanisten					116	0.1	
DKP					36	0.0	
SGP					28	0.0	0.0
Informal votes		1,619			1,328		
Total valid votes		153,520			153,711		
Turnout		155,139	73.1	▲3.0			
SPD hold	Majority	12,101	7.9	▲5.9			

=== 2013 election ===
Federal election (2013): Leverkusen – Cologne IV
Notes:	Blue background denotes the winner of the electorate vote. Pink background denotes a candidate elected from their party list. Yellow background denotes an electorate win by a list member, or other incumbent. A ✓ or ✗ denotes status of any incumbent, win or lose respectively.						
Party	Candidate	Votes	%	±%	Party votes	%	±%
SPD	✓ Karl Lauterbach	61,172	41.3	▲4.3	48,511	32.7	▲4.4
CDU	Helmut Nowak	58,201	39.3	▲3.9	52,884	35.6	▲5.8
Greens	Rainer Blum	10,589	7.2	▼2.1	14,283	9.6	▼2.8
Left	Hamide Akbayir	8,554	5.8	▼2.3	10,615	7.2	▼2.3
FDP	Guido Fischer	3,447	2.3	▼5.5	7,212	4.9	▼9.4
AfD					5,807	3.9	
Pirates					3,816	2.6	▲0.8
NPD	Bernhard Blankenheim	2,450	1.7	0.0	1,578	1.1	▼0.2
FW	Bettina Bernhard	1,604	1.1		632	0.4	
PARTEI	Torsten Arnold Tofahrn	1,529	1.0		993	0.7	
PRO					514	0.3	
Volksabstimmung					315	0.2	▲0.1
BIG					277	0.2	
Nichtwahler					230	0.2	
ÖDP					202	0.1	▲0.1
REP					177	0.1	▼0.2
MLPD	Ernst Albert Herbert	398	0.3	0.0	164	0.1	0.0
Party of Reason					96	0.1	
RRP					65	0.0	▼0.2
BüSo					30	0.0	0.0
PSG					23	0.0	0.0
Die Rechte					16	0.0	
Informal votes		2,086			1,590		
Total valid votes		147,944			148,440		
Turnout		150,030	70.1	▲1.4			
SPD hold	Majority	2,971	2.0	▲0.4			

=== 2009 election ===
Federal election (2009): Leverkusen – Cologne IV
Notes:	Blue background denotes the winner of the electorate vote. Pink background denotes a candidate elected from their party list. Yellow background denotes an electorate win by a list member, or other incumbent. A ✓ or ✗ denotes status of any incumbent, win or lose respectively.						
Party	Candidate	Votes	%	±%	Party votes	%	±%
SPD	✓ Karl Lauterbach	53,517	37.1	▼12.0	40,982	28.3	▼13.5
CDU	Thomas Portz	51,242	35.5	▼0.4	43,188	29.8	▲0.1
Greens	Ulrike Kessing	13,386	9.3	▲4.0	18,064	12.5	▲2.5
Left	Manuel Lindlar	11,723	8.1	▲3.7	13,715	9.5	▲3.9
FDP	Benedikt Vennemann	11,332	7.8	▲3.9	20,670	14.3	▲4.2
Pirates					2,578	1.8	
NPD	Bruno Kirchner	2,364	1.6	▲0.6	1,815	1.3	▲0.4
Tierschutzpartei					1,039	0.7	▲0.3
FAMILIE					712	0.5	▲0.1
RENTNER					620	0.4	
Independent	Jan Dieckmann	529	0.4				
REP					448	0.3	0.0
RRP					292	0.2	
MLPD	Ernst Herbert	323	0.2	0.0	180	0.1	0.0
ÖDP					160	0.1	
Volksabstimmung					153	0.1	0.0
DVU					92	0.1	
Centre					76	0.1	0.0
BüSo					42	0.0	0.0
PSG					29	0.0	0.0
Informal votes		2,044			1,605		
Total valid votes		144,416			144,855		
Turnout		146,460	68.7	▼7.0			
SPD hold	Majority	2,275	1.6	▼11.6			

=== 2005 election ===
Federal election (2005): Leverkusen – Cologne IV
Notes:	Blue background denotes the winner of the electorate vote. Pink background denotes a candidate elected from their party list. Yellow background denotes an electorate win by a list member, or other incumbent. A ✓ or ✗ denotes status of any incumbent, win or lose respectively.						
Party	Candidate	Votes	%	±%	Party votes	%	±%
SPD	Karl Lauterbach	78,235	49.0	▼0.7	66,721	41.8	▼3.6
CDU	Helmut Nowak	57,271	35.9	▲1.8	47,453	29.7	▼1.4
Greens	Reinhard Loske	8,425	5.3	▼2.3	15,856	9.9	▼1.0
Left	Ursula Lötzer	7,050	4.4	▲3.2	8,856	5.5	▲4.1
FDP	Manfred Wolf	6,248	3.9	▼2.1	16,015	10.0	▲1.2
NPD	Ralf Lieberz	1,689	1.1		1,430	0.9	▲0.6
GRAUEN					887	0.6	▲0.2
Tierschutzpartei					716	0.4	▲0.1
Familie					661	0.4	▲0.2
REP					522	0.3	
Humanist	Luz Jahnen	355	0.2				
MLPD	Karl-Heinz Kunkel	280	0.2		170	0.1	
From Now on... Democracy Through Referendum					165	0.1	
PBC					145	0.1	
Socialist Equality Party					89	0.1	
BüSo					50	0.0	
Centre					46	0.0	
Informal votes		1,704			1,471		
Total valid votes		159,553			159,786		
Turnout		161,257	75.7	▼1.4			
SPD hold	Majority	20,964	13.1				
