= Fabian Jacobi =

German politician

Member of the Bundestag
- Incumbent
- Assumed office 24 October 2017

Personal details
- Born: 19 June 1973 (age 53)
- Party: AfD

Fabian Jacobi (born 19 June 1973) is a German politician for the Alternative for Germany (AfD) and since 2017 member of the Bundestag.

== Life and politics ==
Jacobi was born in 1973 in the West German city of Münster and studied jurisprudence to become a lawyer. Jacobi entered the newly founded populist AfD in 2013 and became after the 2017 German federal election a member of the federal law-making body, the Bundestag.
