= Sanae Abdi =

German-Moroccan politician

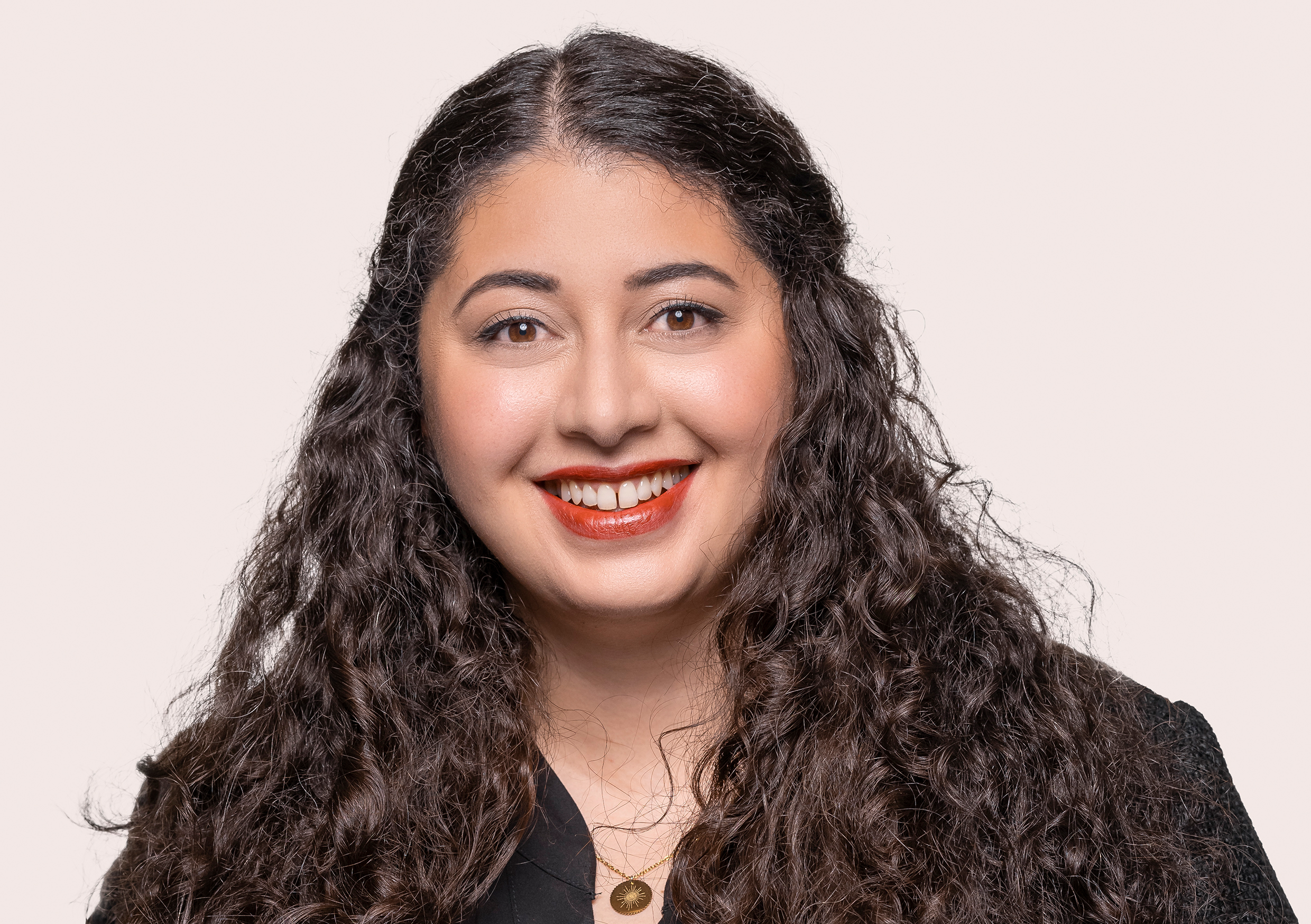

Member of the Bundestag
- Incumbent
- Assumed office 26 October 2021
- Preceded by: Karsten Möring
- Constituency: Cologne I

Personal details
- Born: 7 July 1986 (age 39) Tétouan, Morocco
- Party: Social Democratic Party of Germany
- Website: sanae-abdi.spd.de

Sanae Abdi (born 7 July 1986) is a German-Moroccan lawyer and politician of the Social Democratic Party (SPD) who has been serving as a Member of the Bundestag for the constituency of Cologne I since the 2021 federal election. She is the first person born in Morocco to serve in the Bundestag.

== Early life and career ==
Abdi was born in Morocco and emigrated to Germany at the age of three. She grew up in Lüdenscheid, in the Sauerland region of North Rhine-Westphalia and studied law at University of Marburg, the University of Bonn and the University of Cologne.

From 2018 to 2021, Abdi worked at GIZ in Bonn, where she coordinated projects on sustainable supply chains in the textile industry.

== Political career ==
Abdi ran for the Bundestag in 2021 in a district that historically supported the Social Democrats, but had been held by the Christian Democrats since the 2013 German federal election. She defeated incumbent Karsten Möring for the direct mandate.

In parliament, Abdi has since been serving on the Committee on Economic Cooperation and Development and as her parliamentary group's spokesperson for development policy. From 2022 to 2025, she was also a member of the Committee on Climate Protection and Energy and its Subcommittee on International Climate and Energy Policy. In 2025, she joined the Parliamentary Advisory Board on Sustainable Development.

In addition to her committee assignments, Abdi is part of the German Parliamentary Friendship Group for Relations with the Maghreb States.

Within her parliamentary group, Abdi belongs to the Parliamentary Left, a left-wing movement.

In the negotiations to form a Grand Coalition under the leadership of Friedrich Merz's Christian Democrats (CDU together with the Bavarian CSU) and the SPD following the 2025 German elections, Abdi was part of the SPD delegation in the working group on foreign affairs, defense, development cooperation and human rights, led by Johann Wadephul, Florian Hahn and Svenja Schulze.

== Other activities ==
- German Institute for Development Evaluation (DEval), Member of the Advisory Board (since 2025)
- German United Services Trade Union (ver.di), Member
