= Reinhard Houben =

German politician (born 1960)

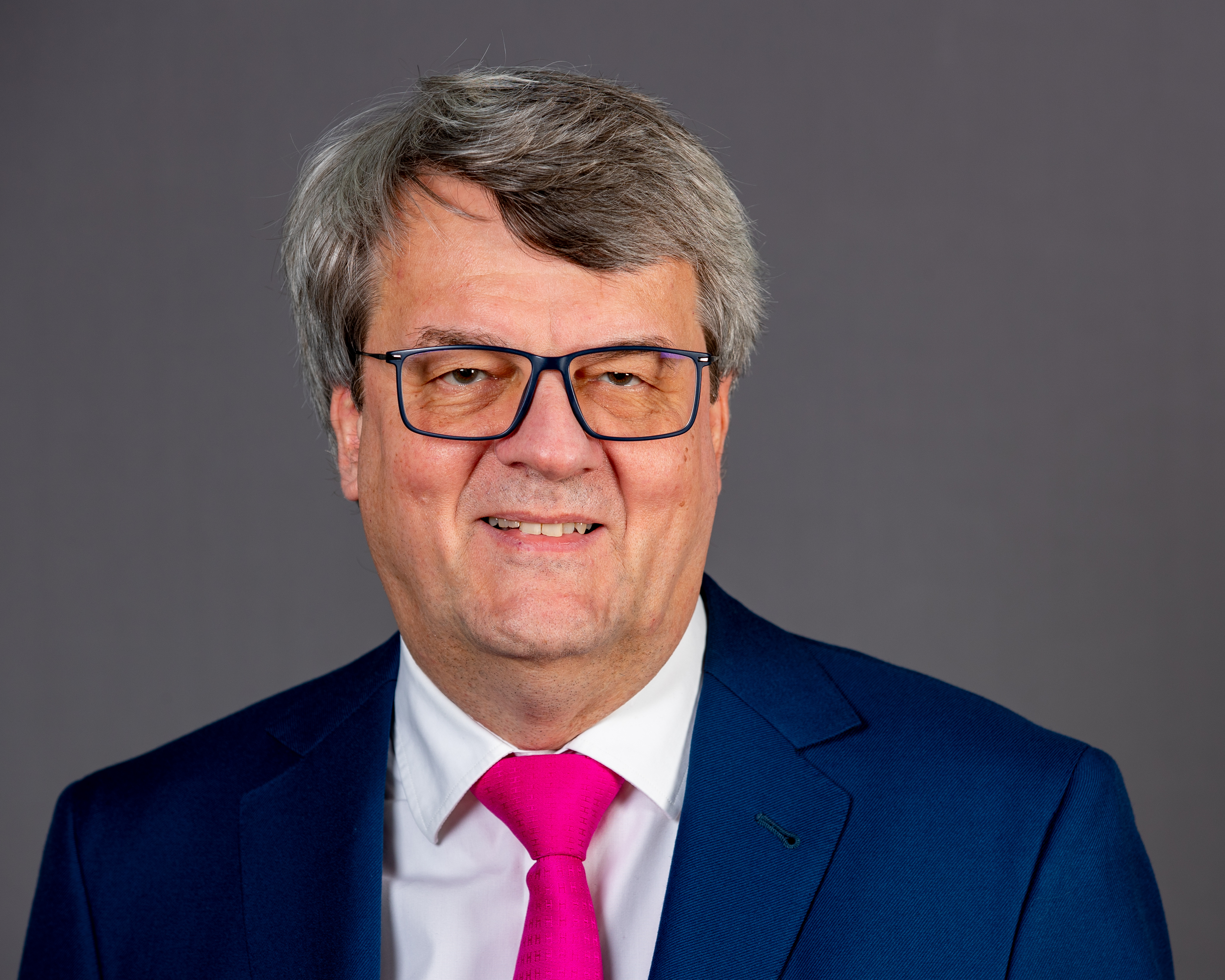
- Houben in 2020

Member of the Bundestag
- In office 2017–2025

Personal details
- Born: 29 April 1960 (age 66) Bensberg, West Germany (now Germany)
- Party: FDP
- Children: 2
- Education: University of Siegen
- Occupation: Entrepreneur

Reinhard Houben (born 29 April 1960) is a German politician of the Free Democratic Party (FDP) who served as a member of the Bundestag from the state of North Rhine-Westphalia from 2017 to 2025.

== Early life and career ==
Houben graduated in business administration in Siegen in 1983 with a degree in business administration. Since 1984 he has been managing partner of Arnold Houben GmbH, a medium-sized trading company in Cologne’s Rodenkirchen district.

== Political career ==
Houben has been a member of the FDP since 1983. On a local level, he served on the city council of Cologne from 1989 until 1994 and from 2009 until 2017.

Houben became a member of the Bundestag in the 2017 German federal election. From January 2018, he was a member of the Committee for Economic Affairs and Energy, where he was his parliamentary group’s spokesperson on economic policy.

In the negotiations to form a so-called traffic light coalition of the Social Democratic Party (SPD), the Green Party and the FDP following the 2021 German elections, Houben was part of his party's delegation in the working group on economic affairs, co-chaired by Carsten Schneider, Cem Özdemir and Michael Theurer.

In September 2024, Houben announced that he would not stand in the 2025 federal elections but instead resign from active politics by the end of the parliamentary term.

== Other activities ==
- Federal Network Agency for Electricity, Gas, Telecommunications, Post and Railway (BNetzA), Member of the Advisory Board
- Koelnmesse, Member of the Supervisory Board (2014–2018)
