= Berivan Aymaz =

German politician (born 1972)

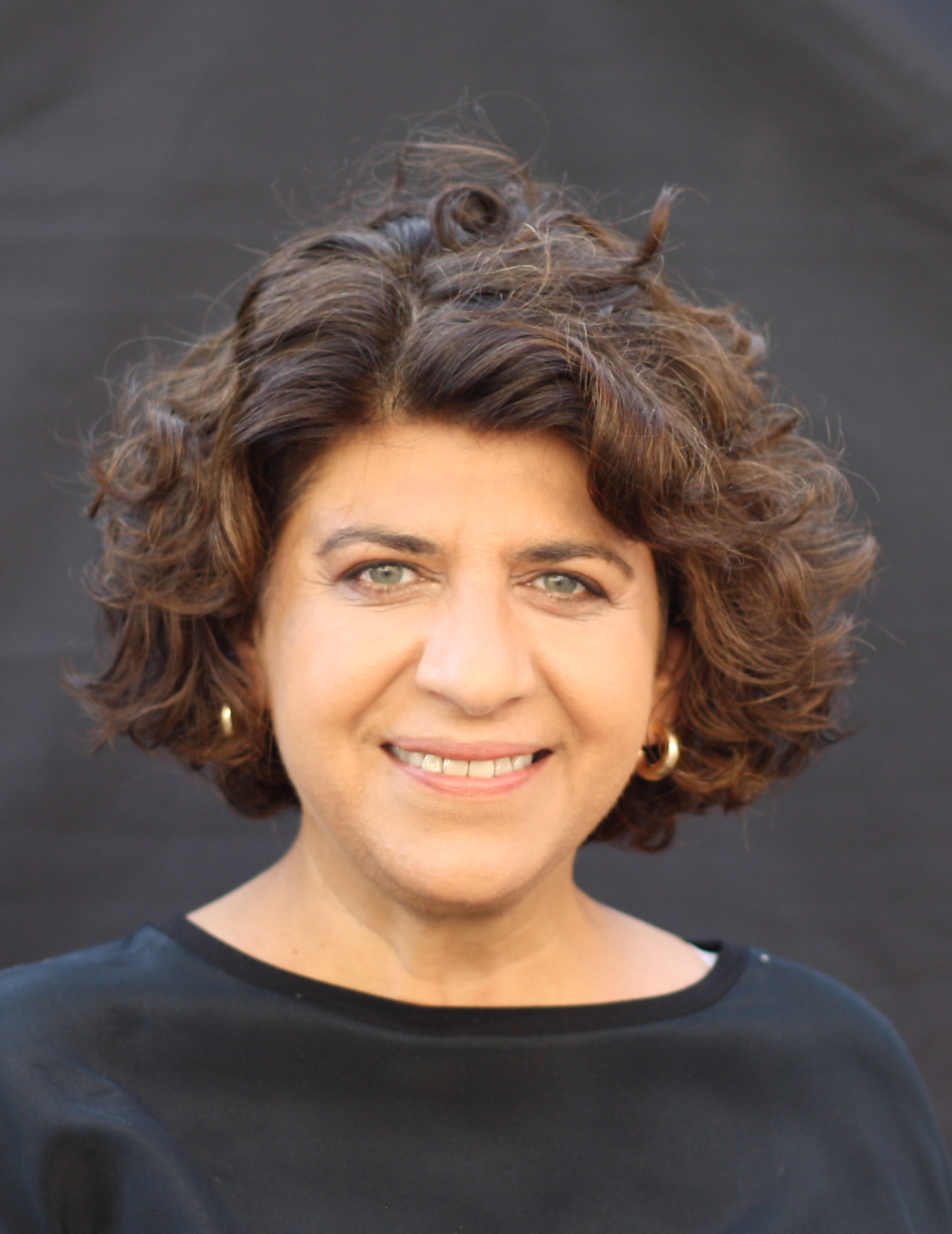
- Aymaz in 2024

Member of the Landtag of North Rhine-Westphalia
- Incumbent
- Assumed office 1 June 2017
- Constituency: Cologne VI (2022–present)

Personal details
- Born: 5 July 1972 (age 53) Genç, Bingöl
- Party: Alliance 90/The Greens (since 2009)

Berivan Aymaz (born 5 July 1972 in Genç, Bingöl) is a Kurdish-German politician, born in Turkey, who has served as a member of the Landtag of North Rhine-Westphalia since 2017. She has served as vice president of the Landtag since 2022.
