= Nicole Gohlke =

German politician (born 1975)

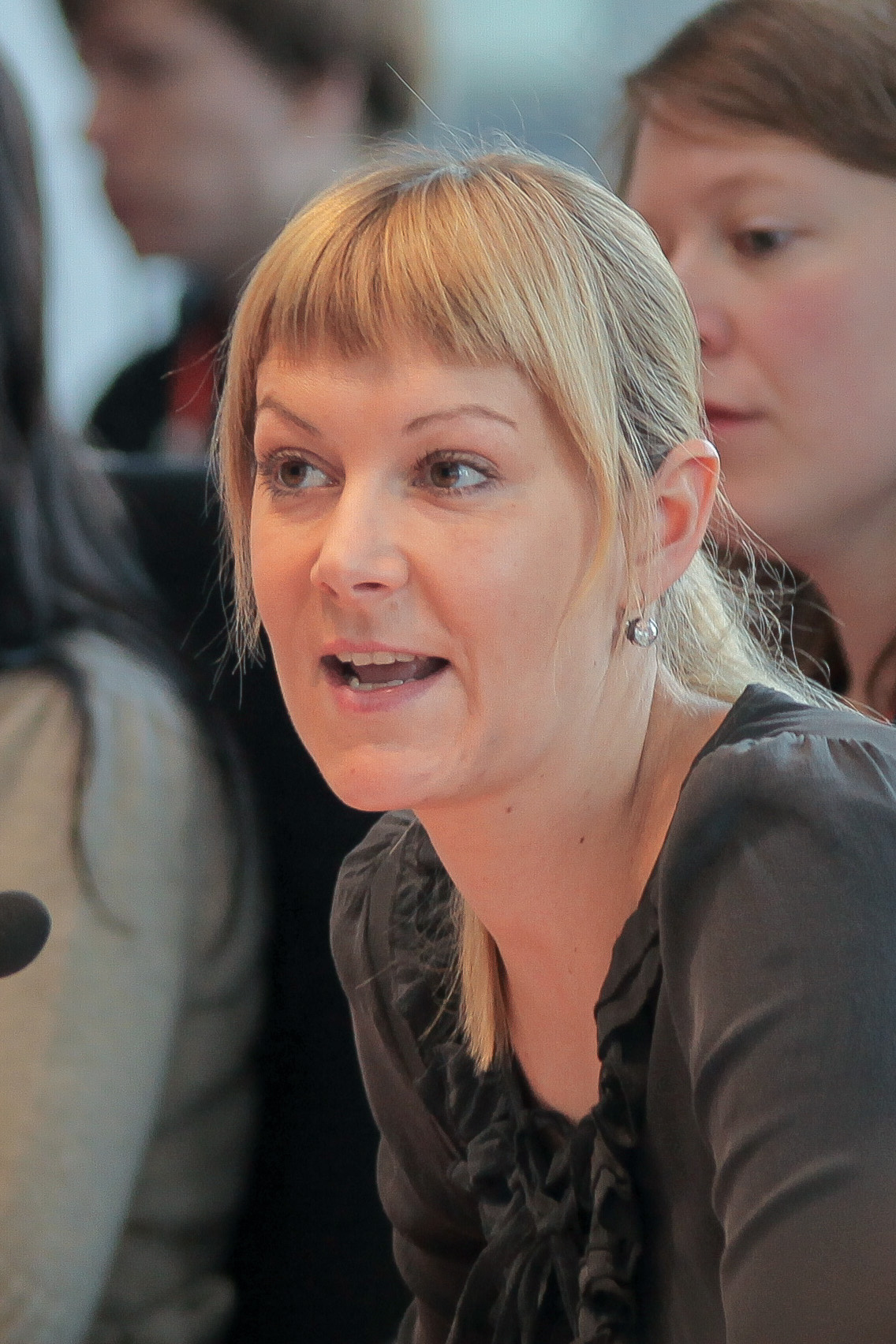
- Gohlke in 2011
- Born: Nicole Stephanie Gohlke; 15 November 1975 (age 50); Munich, Bavaria, Germany
- Occupation: German politician
- Website: http://www.nicole-gohlke.de/

Nicole Stephanie Gohlke (born 15 November 1975) is a German politician (Die Linke).

She has been a member of the Bundestag since autumn 2009. She was one of her party's eight top candidates for the 2013 Bundestag elections.

== Career ==
Gohlke graduated from high school in 1995 and then studied communication science. She completed her studies with a Magister Artium. From 2004 to 2008, she worked as a project manager in event management as well as in market and opinion research. From June 2008 until her entry into the Bundestag, she was employed in the Regional Office South of the parliamentary group Die Linke in the German Bundestag.

Gohlke first joined politics in 1991 in the movement against both the Gulf War and the racist pogroms in the 1990s. During her studies in 1997, she joined the student protests against the austerity plans at the universities. In 2001, she joined the globalization-critical Attac movement. She became a member of the coordination group of Attac Munich, to which she belonged until 2003, and took part in the protests against the World Economic Summit in Genoa in the summer of 2001.

Gohlke became a member of the newly founded WASG. In June 2006 she was elected to the executive committee of the WASG in Bavaria. After the fusion of the party with the PDS, she was a member of the Bavarian state executive committee of The Left from 2007 to 2014. Since October 2016, she has been deputy district spokesperson in Munich.

In autumn 2008, Gohlke stood for election as a direct candidate in the Munich-Bogenhausen constituency in the Bavarian state election and won 5.2% of the first votes. In the 2009 federal election, she received 5.9% of the votes as a direct candidate in the Munich-East constituency, and entered the German Bundestag for the first time as a member of parliament via the state list of The Left. The party nominated her as one of its eight top candidates in January 2013. She was re-elected, is a member of the Committee for Education, Research and Technology Assessment, and is the spokesperson for higher education and science policy of The Left in the Bundestag. She was also re-elected via the state list in 2017.

Within her party, Gohlke is in the Socialist Left caucus.

== Memberships ==
Gohlke is a member of the GEW, ver.di, and the Association of Democratic Scientists (BdWi). She is also a member of the Advisory Board of the Studentenwerk and the Parliamentary Advisory Board of the Fernuniversität in Hagen, of the Förderkreis demokratische Volks- und Hochschulbildung, and of the Kurt-Eisner-Verein in Bavaria.

== Positions ==
Gohlke criticizes university tuition fees, the Bologna Process, and expensive housing for students. As a spokeswoman on higher education policy for her parliamentary group and a member of the Education Committee of the German Bundestag, she advocates improvements in study conditions. The increased burdens on student's time in the Bachelor's program new 3-year degrees limited the possibility for students to finance their studies through work, which would be aggravated by tuition fees. She also calls for the restriction of fixed-term employment contracts in the higher education sector: only "formal and certifiable qualification goals" (master's thesis, doctorate, habilitation) should justify a time limit. Gohlke's opinion is that there should be "permanent positions" for "permanent tasks".

In 2016, she rejected the cooperation of the University of Bremen with the Bundeswehr and praised the legal opinion of the association "NaturwissenschaftlerInnen-Initiative Verantwortung für Frieden und Zukunftsfähigkeit" (Natural Scientists' Initiative Responsibility for Peace and Sustainability), which had presented the incompatibility of the cooperation with the civil clause of the University Constitution. Justice Senator Martin Günthner had considered the cooperation to be admissible, since the Bundeswehr was a "peace army". In February 2017, the Bremen Senate decided in favour of further cooperation in the spirit of Günthner.

In the debate about the Left's refugee positions, she repeatedly took a public stand against faction leader Sahra Wagenknecht. In January 2018, together with Niema Movassat, Tobias Pflüger, Norbert Müller, and other members of parliament, they published the appeal "Solidarity is indivisible" on the platform bewegunglinke.org, which advocated "full freedom of movement and equal social and political participation for all people living in Germany." Further activities were announced at the first advice of the group in April 2018. When Wagenknecht's collective movement "Aufstehen" did not participate in the demonstration "Unteilbar" in October 2018, Gohlke called it "incomprehensible to distance oneself from thousands of people who support left-wing, humane politics."

== Controversies ==
A unanimous decision by the Left parliamentary group against the Boycott, Divestment and Sanctions campaign in 2011 only came about because Gohlke and 14 other members stayed away from the vote.

At a public event on the Battle of Kobanê on 18 October 2014, Gohlke waved a PKK flag and called on the federal government to stop criminalizing this symbol, as "a struggle for freedom, human rights and democracy is currently being waged" under this flag. She also demanded that the PKK ban be lifted. At that time, PKK troops were fighting the Islamic State at Kobanê. Due to the flag showing, Gohlke's parliamentary immunity was lifted by the Bundestag after a heated debate. Gohlke's parliamentary colleague Jan van Aken described the suspension as absurd and showed a picture of the PKK flag, for which he received a call for order. The accusation was tried before the Munich District Court, which merely warned Gohlke and imposed a fine of 1,000 euros.

Gohlke was, until 2015, the last member of the Bundestag to be observed by the Bavarian Office for the Protection of the Constitution. According to the Taz, she was suspicious because of her membership in the post-Trotskyist network Marx21, an antifa emblem, and her involvement in extra-parliamentary opposition groups.

== Personal life ==
Nicole Gohlke is married and has no religion.

== Publications ==
- (with Florian Butollo): Hochschule im Kapitalismus. VSA-Verlag, Hamburg 2012. Als Supplement der Zeitschrift Sozialismus 5/2012.
- Das Hochschul- und Wissenschaftsprogramm der AfD – völkisch, reaktionär, elitär im Forum Wissenschaft – Nr. 3/ September 2016 des BdWi (Bund demokratischer Wissenschaftlerinnen und Wissenschaftler).
- (with Erkin Erdogan and Jürgen Ehlers): Erdogans Türkei: Ein Land zwischen Repression und Widerstand (Edition Aurora). M21 Verlag, 2017, ISBN 978-3-94724-005-0.
