= Socialist Left (Germany) =

Political caucus in the Left Party of Germany

Logo der Sozialistischen Linken

The Socialist Left (German: Sozialistische Linke, SL) is a political caucus in the Left Party of Germany (German: Die Linke). It includes political viewpoints ranging from left Keynesianism and left social democracy to reform communism and Marxism. SL members share a common goal of orienting the Left Party firmly toward the labour movement.

== Overview ==
Socialist Left was founded on 19 August 2006 in Wuppertal at a meeting of 50 delegates. Most of its members were initially members of the Labor and Social Justice Alternative, and its membership was centered in West Germany. Following the merger of the WASG with the Party of Democratic Socialism to form the Left Party, the SL formed a tendency of the new party.

The position papers of the SL, "Sozialistische Linke: realistisch und radikal!", summarizes the group's views: "Progressive social changes, in our belief, can only be achieved through interactions between the political forces and extraparliamentary social movements. Most important are therefore the trade unions". The SL has strongly endorsed the campaign for a German minimum wage law. They support demand-side economic policies, as well as public investment in "educational, social, ecological and transportation infrastructure". "Reforms and the struggle for a socialist society are not contradictory," the SL position papers state. "Economic and social regulation, social-welfare structures, as well as the achievements of representative democracy can be the starting point for large changes to society". The organization is particularly sympathetic to the Dutch Socialist Party and the Italian Communist Refoundation Party, both of which have a strong trade-union orientation.

A number of Socialist Left members are prominent in the Left Party, German trade unions and the Bundestag. SL members include Ursula Lötzer (Bundestag member and Left Party spokesperson on international economic policy); Ralf Krämer (Secretary of the ver.di union's National Committee); and Hüseyin Kenan Aydın (a Turkish-born member of the Bundestag and secretary of the IG Metall union in Düsseldorf).

Adherents of the Trotskyist group Marx21 are among the leading members of the Socialist Left, especially in Berlin. Marx21 leaders Christine Buchholz and Lucia Schnell are particularly active in the SL.
