= Martina Renner =

German politician

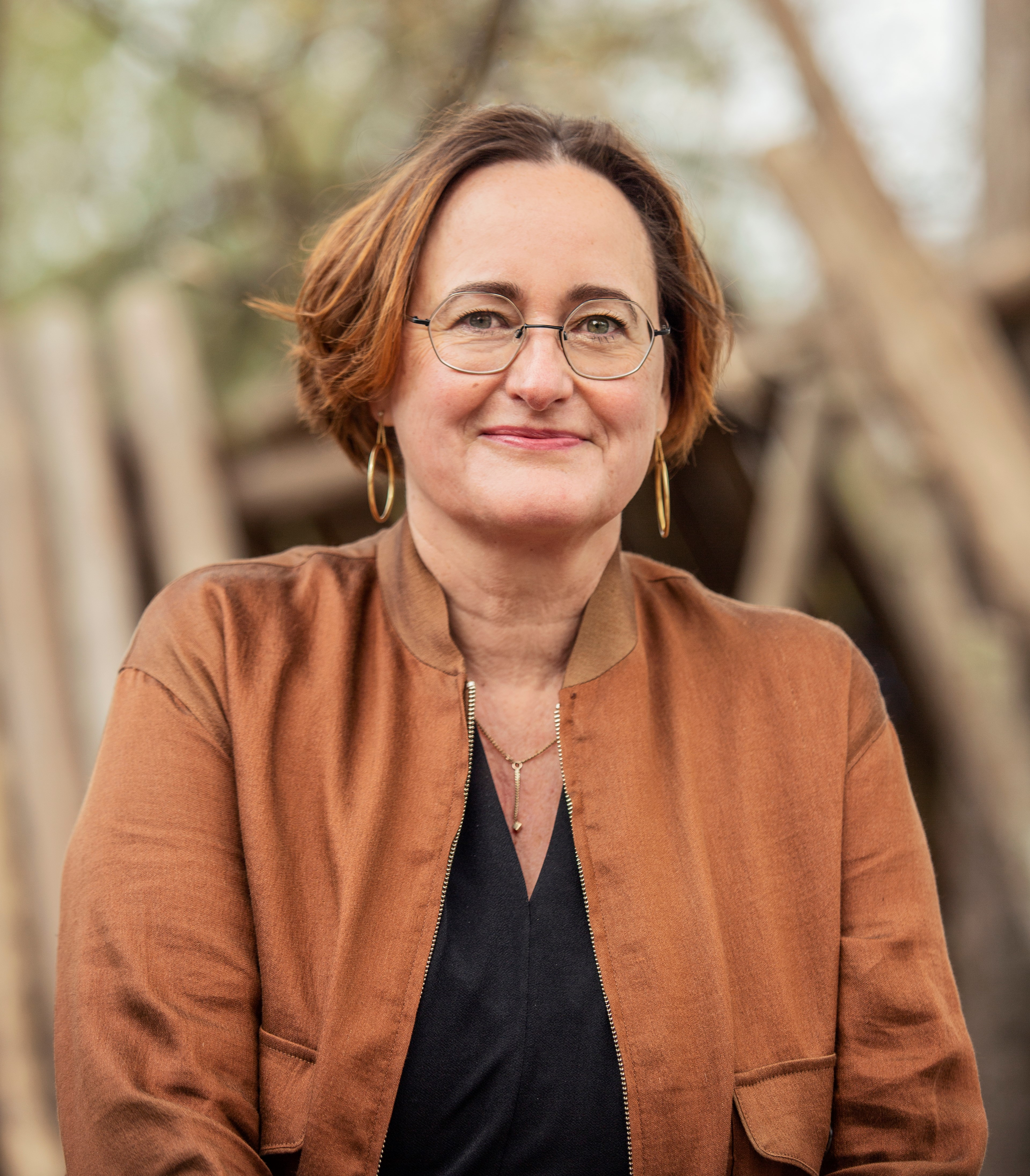
- Renner in 2021

Deputy Leader of The Left
- Incumbent
- Assumed office 9 June 2018 Serving with Ali Al-Dailami, Ates Gürpinar, Tobias Pflüger, Katina Schubert, and Jana Seppelt

Member of the Bundestag
- Incumbent
- Assumed office 22 September 2013
- Constituency: Thuringia

Personal details
- Born: 11 March 1967 (age 59) Mainz, Rhineland-Palatinate, West Germany
- Party: The Left

Martina Renner (born 11 March 1967) is a German politician of The Left who has been a member of the Bundestag since 2013 and one of six deputy leaders of her party since 2018.

== Life and education ==
Renner grew up in Mainz and attended the Gymnasium Gonsenheim, earning her Abitur in 1986. She then studied philosophy, cultural studies, art studies, and biology at the University of Bremen from 1987 to 1995. She was a member of the board of the General Students' Committee there from 1993 to 1995. After graduating, she worked in Bremen from 1996 to 1997 as an education and public relations officer at the German-Kurdish Friendship Association and from 1998 to 2002 as a cultural manager at the Fuhrpark district cultural center.

== Political career ==
Renner grew up in the Gonsenheim neighbourhood of Mainz, where both the far-right extremist Aid Organisation for National Political Prisoners and neo-Nazi activists Ursula and Curt Müller were active. Being exposed to their activities during her teenage years, Renner developed a strong political conscience and opposition to right-wing extremism.

In 1998, she became a member of the state executive of the Party of Democratic Socialism (PDS) in Bremen, serving until 2001. She was the party's lead candidate in the 1999 Bremen state election, but they did not win any seats.

In 2002, Renner became a research assistant to the PDS parliamentary group in the Landtag of Thuringia. From 2005 to 2007, she served in the PDS district executive in Erfurt. She was elected to the Landtag in the 2009 Thuringian state election and became deputy chair of The Left faction, as well as spokeswoman for domestic policy. During her time in the Landtag, she was vice-chair of the investigative committee on the National Socialist Underground.

Renner was third on The Left's state list in the 2013 German federal election and was elected to the Bundestag. In March 2014, she was nominated to the German Parliamentary Committee investigation of the NSA spying scandal. She was re-elected to the Bundestag in the 2017 German federal election as the lead candidate in Thuringia. In the 19th Bundestag, she became spokeswoman for anti-fascism and a member of the Interior Committee. She is also representative of The Left on the Board of Trustees of the Federal Agency for Civic Education.

In June 2018, Renner was elected as one of six deputy federal leaders of The Left. She was re-elected to the position in January 2021.

On 26 September 2019, Renner received a call to order from vice-president of the Bundestag Wolfgang Kubicki for wearing an Antifa sticker on her lapel while speaking in opposition to a motion introduced by the AfD calling to outlaw Antifa. In the aftermath, Kubicki stated that "wearing a button from this group, which legitimises and sometimes pursues attacks on police officers and state institutions, is incompatible with the dignity of the parliament." Renner protested the equation of anti-fascism with fascism itself and noted the value of anti-fascist organisations in combating right-wing extremism; she received support from other Left and Green politicians. Renner regularly consults professional anti-fascist publications and research networks, such as the Antifa-Infoblatt or apabiz, when writing on the topics of extremism, civil rights, and democracy.

In the 2021 German federal election, Renner was third on the Thuringian list and re-elected to the Bundestag. She also ran in the constituency of Eisenach – Wartburgkreis – Unstrut-Hainich-Kreis, placing fourth with 11.2% of votes.

In November 2024 Renner announced that she would not seek re-election for the Bundestag in February 2025.

== Personal life ==
Renner has lived in Thuringia since 2002. She is married and has three children.
