= Lucy Redler =

German politician

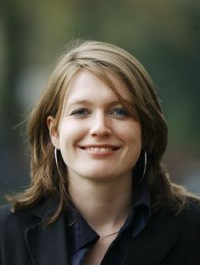
- Redler
- Born: 17 August 1979 (age 47); Hann. Münden, Lower Saxony, West Germany (now Germany)
- Occupation: Politician
- Political party: Die Linke
- Other political affiliations: Socialist Alternative

Lucy Redler (born 17 August 1979) is a German politician, Socialist Alternative activist, and member of the Left Party. From 2005 to 2007, Redler served on the executive committee of the Berlin section of the Labor and Social Justice List (WASG), and she was its chief candidate in the 2006 Berlin state elections. The German media has given Redler the nickname "Red Lucy".

== Early life ==
Redler was born on 17 August 1979, in Hann. Münden, near Kassel, in Lower Saxony. She is the daughter of a social worker and a pediatric nurse. She first became active in politics through anti-fascist demonstrations. At the age of 15, she became involved with the group Youth against Racism in Europe, which was organized by the Trotskyist group Socialist Alternative (SAV) and other sections of the CWI. Redler studied political economy at the Hamburg University for Economy and Politics.

== Political career ==
Remaining in Hamburg following her graduation, she became a local spokesperson for "Youth against War", an anti-Iraq War group close to the SAV. In the 2002 German federal elections, Redler ran in a Hamburg district as an SAV candidate for the Bundestag. In the 2004 Hamburg state election, she ran on the electoral list of Regenbogen ("Rainbow"), which was a local electoral alliance of the Party of Democratic Socialism (PDS), Communist Party (DKP), and SAV.

In 2005, Redler moved to Berlin and became editor of the SAV newspaper, Solidarität. In November of that year, she was elected to the executive committee of the WASG's Berlin section. She then ran as the head candidate of the WASG in the September 2006 Berlin state elections. The Berlin WASG campaign was controversial, since its candidates directly challenged the slate of the PDS, which was allied with the WASG. Redler openly criticized the role of PDS politicians as participants in the state government. In November 2006, she was elected to the National Committee of the WASG; however, seven months later, the organization voted to merge with the PDS and form the Left Party.

Critical of the terms of the WASG-PDS merger, Redler initially attempted to organize a group that was autonomous from the Left Party in Berlin, known as the Berlin Alternative for Solidarity and Justice (BASG). However, in September 2008, the SAV instructed its East German and Berlin members to join the Left Party. Redler applied for membership in the party, which fueled controversy because of her past activities. The issue even appeared in the pages of major newspapers, such as Der Spiegel, Die Welt, and the Berliner Morgenpost. Because of opposition from some leaders of the Left Party, she was not accepted as a member of the party until August 2010. Since 2016, Redler has been a member of the Parteivorstand (National Executive Committee) of the Left Party.
