= Sabine Ritter =

German sociologist and politician

Member of the Hamburg Parliament
- Incumbent
- Assumed office 2025

Personal details
- Born: 14 June 1968 (age 58) Germany
- Party: Die Linke (since 2018)
- Other political affiliations: SPD (2005)
- Education: University of Hamburg

Sabine Ritter (born 14 June 1968) is a German politician and sociologist. Since 2022 she has been the state chairwoman of Die Linke Hamburg in the Free and Hanseatic City of Hamburg, since 2024 deputy party chairwoman and since 2025 a member of the Hamburg Parliament.

== Biography ==
=== Education ===
After attending the Rudi-Stephan-Gymnasium in Worms, Ritter began studying to become a teacher of Protestant theology, Latin, and German at the University of Mainz in 1988, but she discontinued her studies. Instead, she completed an apprenticeship as a bookseller in Worms and then worked in an antiquarian bookshop in Hamburg. From 1997 to 2001, she studied sociology at the Hamburg University of Economics and Politics, graduating with a diploma thesis on the discourse of violence in sociology. From 2002 to 2004, she pursued postgraduate studies in criminology at the University of Hamburg, graduating with a diploma in criminology. She then spent three years working on a doctoral dissertation about Sarah Baartman, which she defended at the University of Hamburg in 2008.

=== Sociologist ===
From 2009 to 2011, Ritter was a lecturer at the Leuphana University of Lüneburg and an associate research assistant at the Heisenberg Professorship for "Europe and Modernity" at the University of Hamburg, working with Olaf Asbach. From 2011, she worked part-time as a lecturer at the Institute of Sociology at the University of Bremen, and from 2015 to 2021, she also served as dean of studies for the Faculty of Social Sciences. From 2021 to 2025, she was a full-time lecturer at the Bremen Institute of Sociology, where she was responsible for the modules "Sociological Thinking" and "Techniques of Academic Writing".

Ritter was a staff member of the department for life course, life course politics and social integration (working group Qualitative Methods and Microsociology) at the Research Center on Inequality and Social Policy (SOCIUM). Her research interests include discourse analysis, textbooks as archives and distributors of knowledge, issues of racism analysis and gender sociology, and the middle classes from a cultural sociological perspective.

In December 2024, she received the Berninghausen Prize for outstanding teaching from the University of Bremen.

=== Politician ===
Ritter was briefly a member of the SPD in 2005, and joined the Left Party in 2018. Until her election as co-state spokesperson in 2022, she was the party spokesperson for the Eimsbüttel district association.

In the 2020 Hamburg state election, Ritter ran unsuccessfully in fifth place on the Left Party's list in the Rotherbaum – Harvestehude – Eimsbüttel-East constituency.

In September 2022, Ritter was elected state spokesperson (together with Thomas Iwan) at the eighth party conference of the Hamburg state branch of the Left Party. She received almost 71 percent of the votes. Her election was supported by the more moderate and pragmatic group "Konkret Links" (Concrete Left). In her acceptance speech, Ritter spoke out against what she considered half-hearted climate policy, patriarchy and class politics. She advocates for free public transportation and more housing, which, if necessary, should be created through expropriation.

At the ninth party congress in October 2024, Ritter was elected deputy chair of the federal party.

Ritter was elected to the Hamburg Parliament in the 2025 Hamburg state election. She serves as spokesperson for education, school, training and science policy within the Left Party parliamentary group.

=== Personal life ===
Ritter lives in Hamburg. She is the mother of two adult children.

== Publications (selection) ==
- Facetten der Sarah Baartman: Repräsentationen und Rekonstruktionen der "Hottentottenvenus" Lit, Berlin 2010, ISBN 978-3-643-10950-7
- Die Mitte als Kampfzone: Wertorientierungen und Abgrenzungspraktiken der Mittelschichten. Herausgegeben zusammen mit Nadine M. Schöneck. transcript Verlag, Bielefeld 2018, ISBN 978-3-8376-4034-2
