= Luise Neuhaus-Wartenberg =

German politician (born 1980)

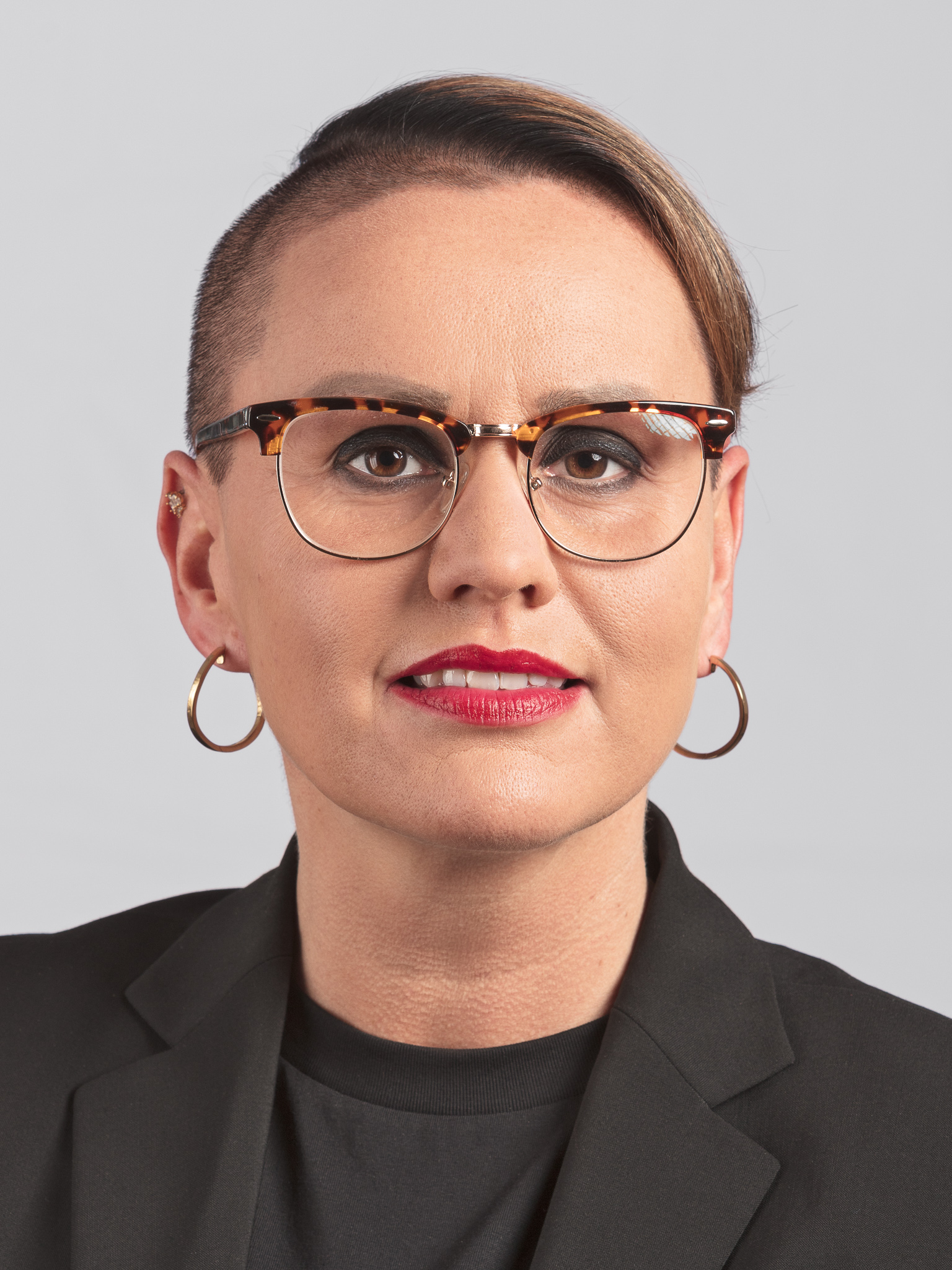
- Neuhaus-Wartenberg in 2019

Member of the Landtag of Saxony
- Incumbent
- Assumed office 29 September 2014

Personal details
- Born: 31 May 1980 (age 45) Leipzig
- Party: Die Linke (since 2009)

Luise Neuhaus-Wartenberg (born 31 May 1980 in Leipzig) is a German politician serving as a member of the Landtag of Saxony since 2014. She has served as federal deputy leader of Die Linke since 2024.
