= Ates Gürpinar =

German politician (born 1984)

Ates Gürpınar
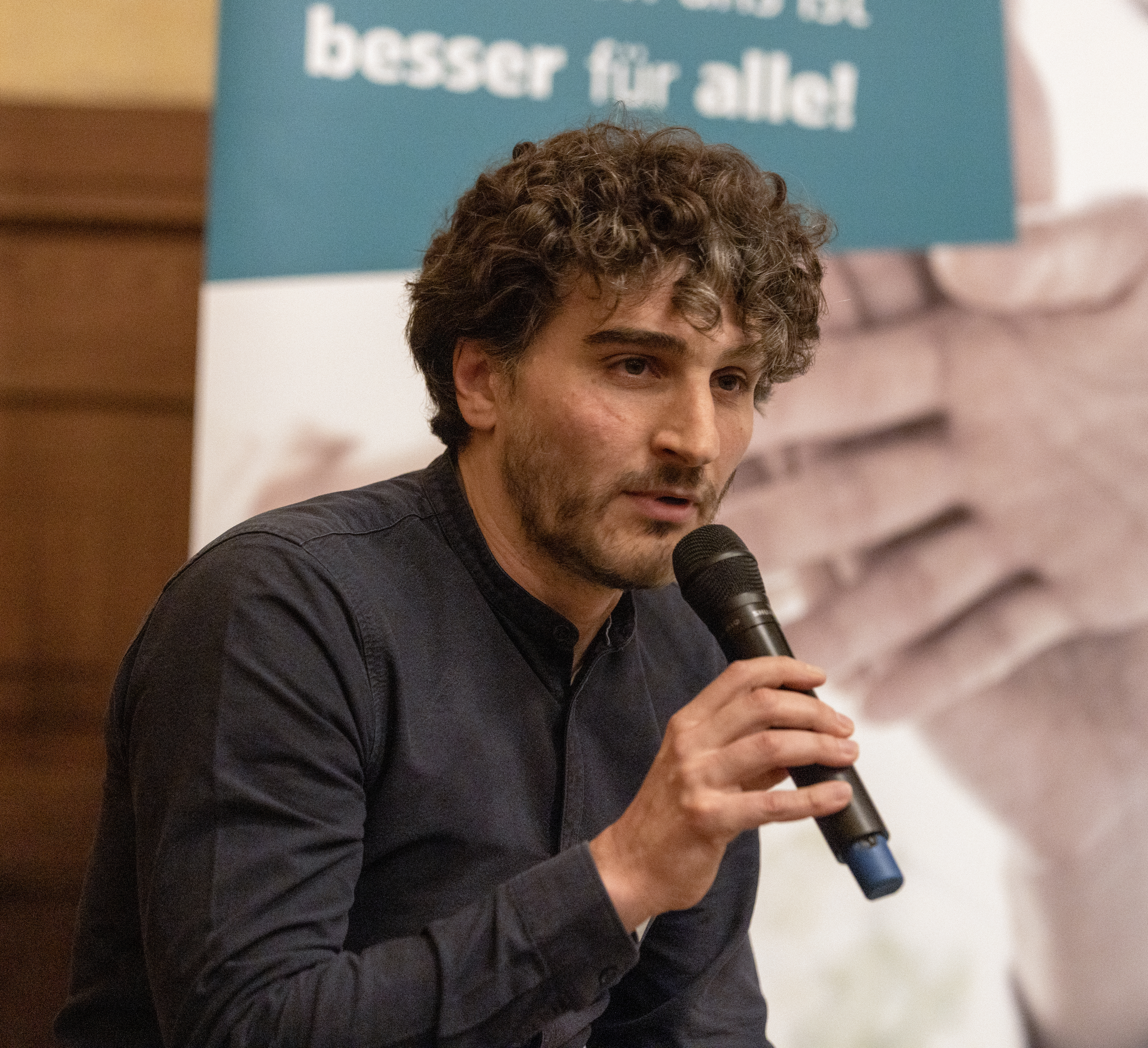
- Gürpınar in 2024

Member of the Bundestag
- Incumbent
- Assumed office 26 October 2021
- Constituency: Bavaria

Deputy Leader of The Left
- Incumbent
- Assumed office 27 February 2021 Serving with Ali Al-Dailami, Tobias Pflüger, Martina Renner, Katina Schubert, and Jana Seppelt

Personal details
- Born: Ates Nils Gürpınar; 25 September 1984 (age 42) Darmstadt, Hesse, West Germany
- Citizenship: Germany; Turkey
- Party: The Left (since 2010)
- Education: University of Erlangen–Nuremberg

Ates Nils Gürpınar (born 25 September 1984) is a German politician of The Left who has been serving as a member of the Bundestag since 2021 and one of six deputy leaders of his party since 2018. He has also been co-chairman of the Bavarian branch of The Left since 2016.

== Life and career ==
Gürpınar was born to a Turkish father and a German mother. He attended the Edith-Stein-Schule in Darmstadt and earned his Abitur in 2003. He studied at the University of Erlangen–Nuremberg from 2004 to 2011 and graduated with a magister degree in media science and a master's in ethics of text cultures. He also studied modern German literary history and philosophy but did not earn a degree. He teaches media studies and economics at the Darmstadt University of Applied Sciences.

== Political career ==
Gürpınar joined The Left in 2010. He became politically engaged due to the Afghanistan and Iraq wars, as well as the Europe-wide student protests in which he participated in 2009. He became press spokesman for the Bavarian party branch in 2012, and was state managing director from 2014 to 2016. In 2016, he was elected co-leader of the state party. In the 2017 German federal election, he stood in Munich North constituency and won 6.0% of the vote. He was not elected. Along with his counterpart Eva Bulling-Schröter, he was lead candidate for The Left in the 2018 Bavarian state election, but the party failed to win any seats.

In February 2021, Gürpınar was elected one of six federal deputy leaders of The Left. At a party congress, he was nominated with 52% of votes and confirmed with 77%.

In the 2021 German federal election, Gürpınar was elected to the Bundestag in fourth place on the state list. He also ran in the Rosenheim constituency, winning 2.2% of votes.
