= Katja Maurer =

German politician (born 1991)

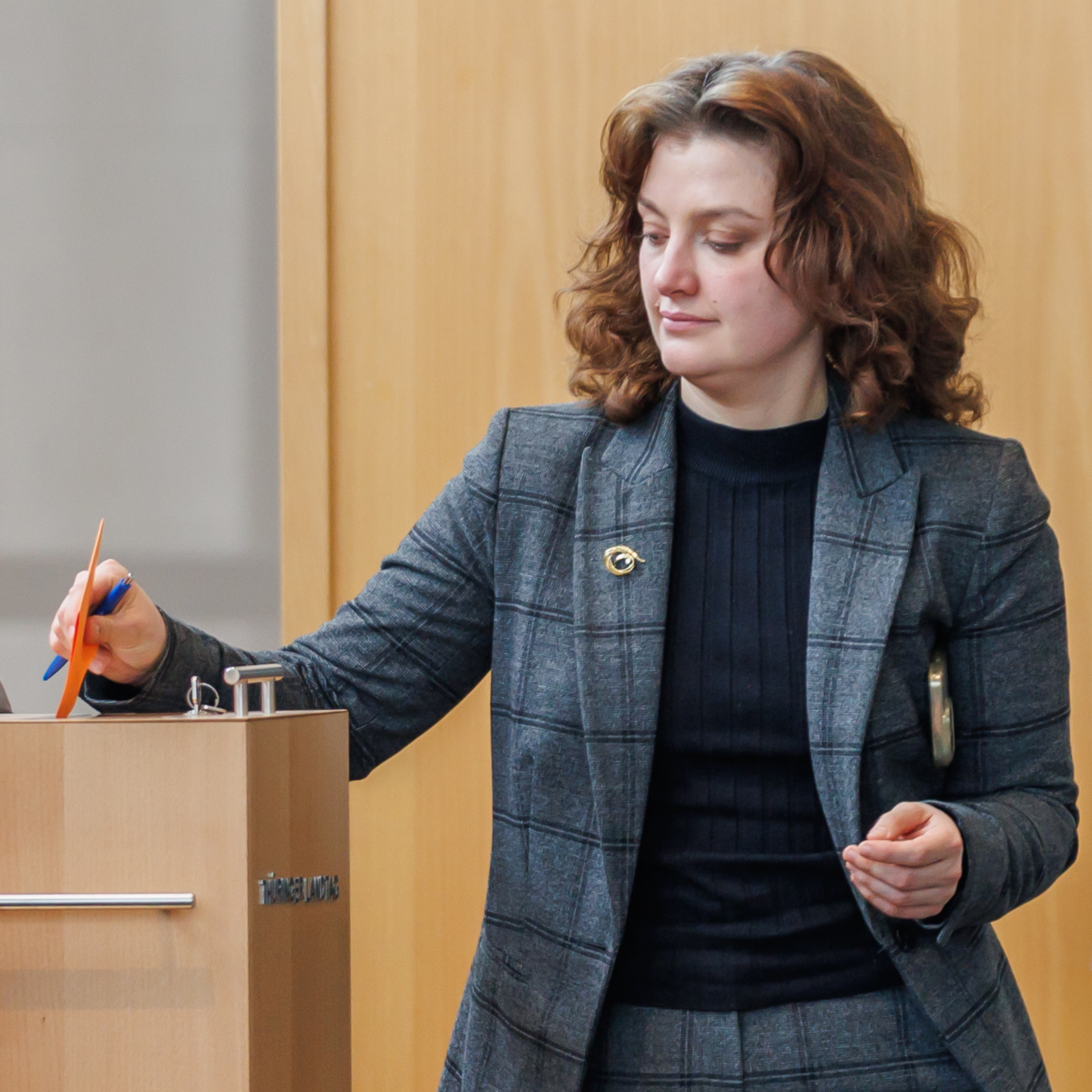
- Maurer in 2026

Member of the Landtag of Thuringia
- Incumbent
- Assumed office 26 November 2019

Personal details
- Born: 13 May 1991 (age 34)
- Party: Die Linke

Katja Kathrin Maurer (born 13 May 1991) is a Soviet-born German politician serving as a member of the Landtag of Thuringia since 2019. She has served as co-chair of Die Linke in Thuringia since 2025.
