= Hennis Herbst =

German politician (born 1996)

Member of the Landtag of Mecklenburg-Vorpommern
- Incumbent
- Assumed office 20 October 2026

Personal details
- Born: 20 November 1996 (age 29)
- Party: Die Linke (since 2020)

Hennis Herbst (born 20 November 1996) is a German politician who was elected member of the Landtag of Mecklenburg-Vorpommern in 2026. He has served as chairman of Die Linke in Mecklenburg-Vorpommern since 2024.
