= Linksruck =

Trotskyist group in Germany

Logo

Left Shift (German: Linksruck) was a Trotskyist group in Germany, which was the German affiliate of the International Socialist Tendency (the network founded by the British Socialist Workers Party). In September 2007, Linksruck formally dissolved, and its members regrouped into the Left Party as Marx21 – Network for International Socialism.

== History ==
Linksruck's origins lie in the Socialist Workers' Group (Sozialistische Arbeitergruppe, SAG), which was founded in the 1970s by West German supporters of the British "International Socialists" (IS), precursor to the Socialist Workers Party (SWP). One of the founders of the SAG was Volkhard Mosler, who had been in contact with IS leader Tony Cliff since 1966. Initially based in Frankfurt, the SAG gradually developed a national structure but remained a relatively small organization. Like their British counterparts, the SAG sought to build a radical rank-and-file workers' movement to oppose moderate trade-union leaders.

After German reunification in 1990, the SAG participated in the emerging Antifa movement against the far right. In the early 1990s young members of the SAG joined Jusos, the Social Democratic Party's youth group, hoping to push its members to the left. After a short time, it began publishing the paper Linksruck, and by the end of 1993 the organization referred to itself by this name.

Dissidents in the group led by Norbert Nelte, critical of Linksruck's entryist tactics and the "lack of theoretical training for new members", broke off and formed the International Socialists (Internationale Sozialisten) in Cologne in 1992.

In the 1990s, Linksruck shifted away from the SPD youth and became involved with the growing antiglobalization movement, and later the anti-Iraq War movement. Through participation in these decentralized movements, Linksruck gained many new members. As the group made a transition from the antiglobalization movement to the anti-war movement, its most strident antiglobalization activists split off to form the Antikapitalistisches Netzwerk (commonly referred to as the "Antikapitalistas").

When left-wing dissidents split from the Social Democrats in 2005 to form the WASG, Linksruck members entered the new organization. Linksruck member Christine Buchholz served on the WASG's National Committee. Other members also took stood as WASG candidates in local and federal elections.

Over the course of 2007, Linksruck leaders sought to relaunch their group (in preparation for the merger of the WASG with the Party of Democratic Socialism, which would form the Left Party). In April 2007, an organizational meeting voted to dissolve the organization. In May 2007, the magazine Linksruck was replaced by a new publication, marx21. In early September 2007 (three months after the formation of the Left Party), a founding congress ended Linksruck and launched the new "Marx21: Network for International Socialism". Marx21 aims at being "a network for Marxists within the new Left Party" and is a component of the party's Socialist Left caucus.

In the 2008 state elections in Hesse, Linksruck/Marx21 activist Janine Wissler was elected to the state parliament.

Christine Buchholz is now a member of the Left Party's National Committee. In 2009, Buchholz became a member of the German Bundestag.
