= Christine Buchholz =

German politician (born 1971)

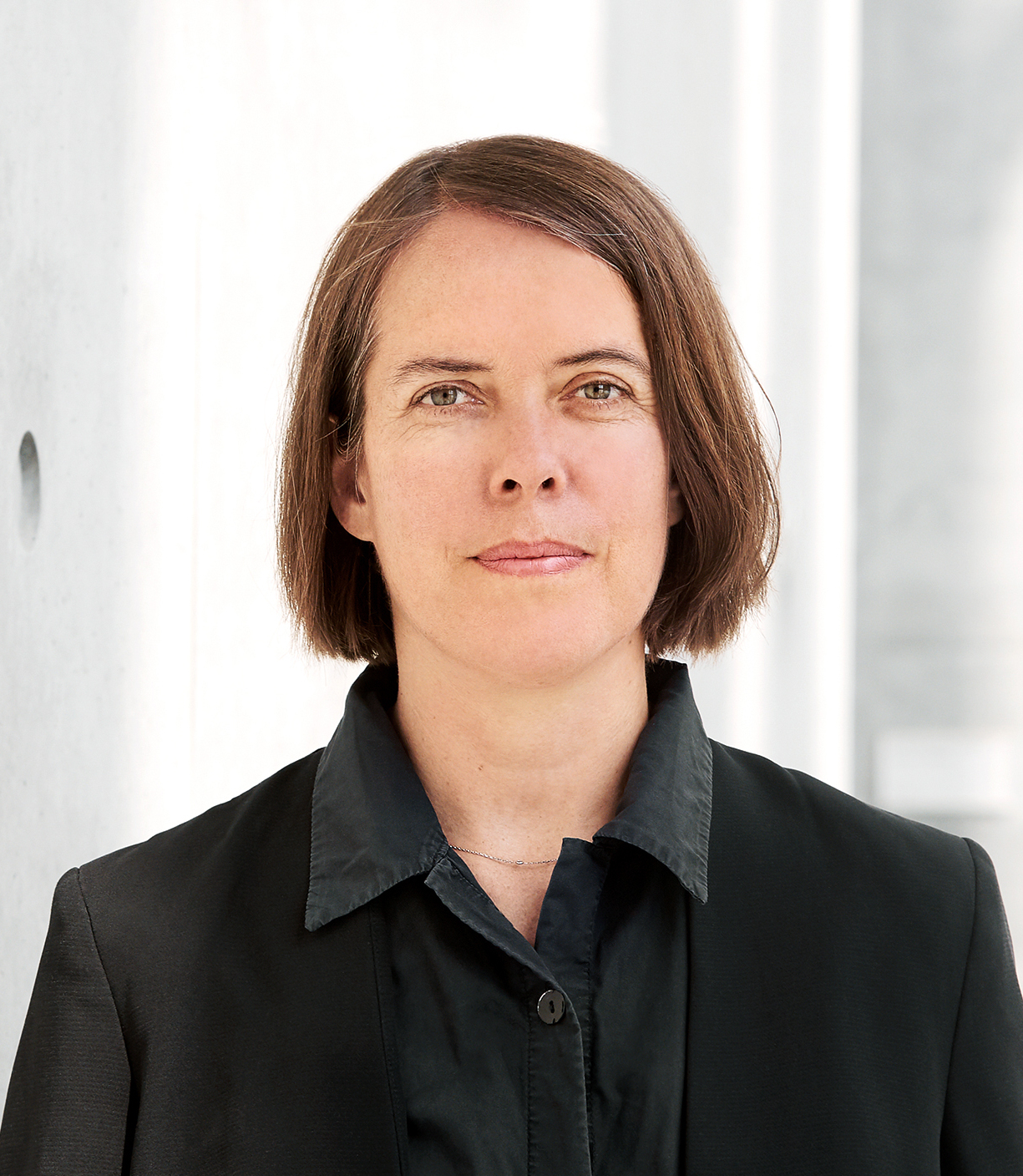
- Buchholz in 2019

Member of the Bundestag; from Hesse
- In office 27 October 2009 – 26 October 2021
- Constituency: State list

Personal details
- Born: 2 April 1971 (age 55) Hamburg, West Germany
- Party: Die Linke
- Children: 2
- Education: University of Hamburg

Christine Ann Buchholz (born 2 April 1971) is a German politician and was member of the Bundestag, the German federal diet from 2009 to 2021 for the Die Linke. A progressive activist, Bucholz is a member of Marx21, a network of trotskyists within Die Linke broadly aligned with the International Socialist Tendency.

== Education and early career ==
From 1991 to 1998, Buchholz studied education and social sciences with a focus on politics and religion at the University of Hamburg. After the state examination she took up a supplementary study of science history. Since 1995 she has also worked in Hamburg and Berlin as an assistant for people with disabilities. From 1997 to 2001 she was a member of the works council in a Hamburg nursing company. She was certified as ötv - Vertrauensfrau (trusted woman) and is a member of the union ver.di. From 2002 she worked as a freelance editor and from 2005 to 2009 as a research assistant to a member of the left parliamentary group Linksfraktion.

== Political career ==
Since the early 1990s she has been active in the antifascist scene. In 1994 she became a member of the Trotskyist organization Linksruck. From 1994 to 1999 she was a member of the SPD. She was active early in the anti-globalization movement and became a member of Attac. She was one of the organizers of the European Social Forum, the Social Forum in Germany and the protests against the G8 summit in Heiligendamm (2007). She participated in the organization and implementation of the Blockupy protests against "banking power and the austerity of the EU troika". In the Bundestag she spoke against austerity, the European Stability Mechanism and the European Fiscal Compact.

Buchholz proposed in early 2013 that politicians of the other two (former) opposition parties SPD and Greens should seek political compromises. With a view to the federal election in 2013 (and apparently on the subject of a red-red-green coalition), she said that there is no substantive basis for a government participation because of the support of foreign operations of the Bundeswehr and the approval of Angela Merkel's EU austerity.

Through her membership in Linksruck (dissolved in 2007) she joined the WASG, whose extended federal board she belonged from spring 2005. In March 2007, she was elected to the executive WASG board. Since the Unification Party Convention on 16 June 2007 she is a member of the executive party executive committee of the left, where she is responsible for peace and disarmament.

Buchholz is (as of 2008) a supporter of the Trotskyist organization Marx21 within Die Linke and was the author of the magazine of the same name.

Buchholz is considered a protagonist of the left party wing within the party Die Linke. In 2011, she criticized the attempt by reformers such as Stefan Liebich to change the foreign policy foundations of the party.
