= Tobias Pflüger =

German politician (born 1965)

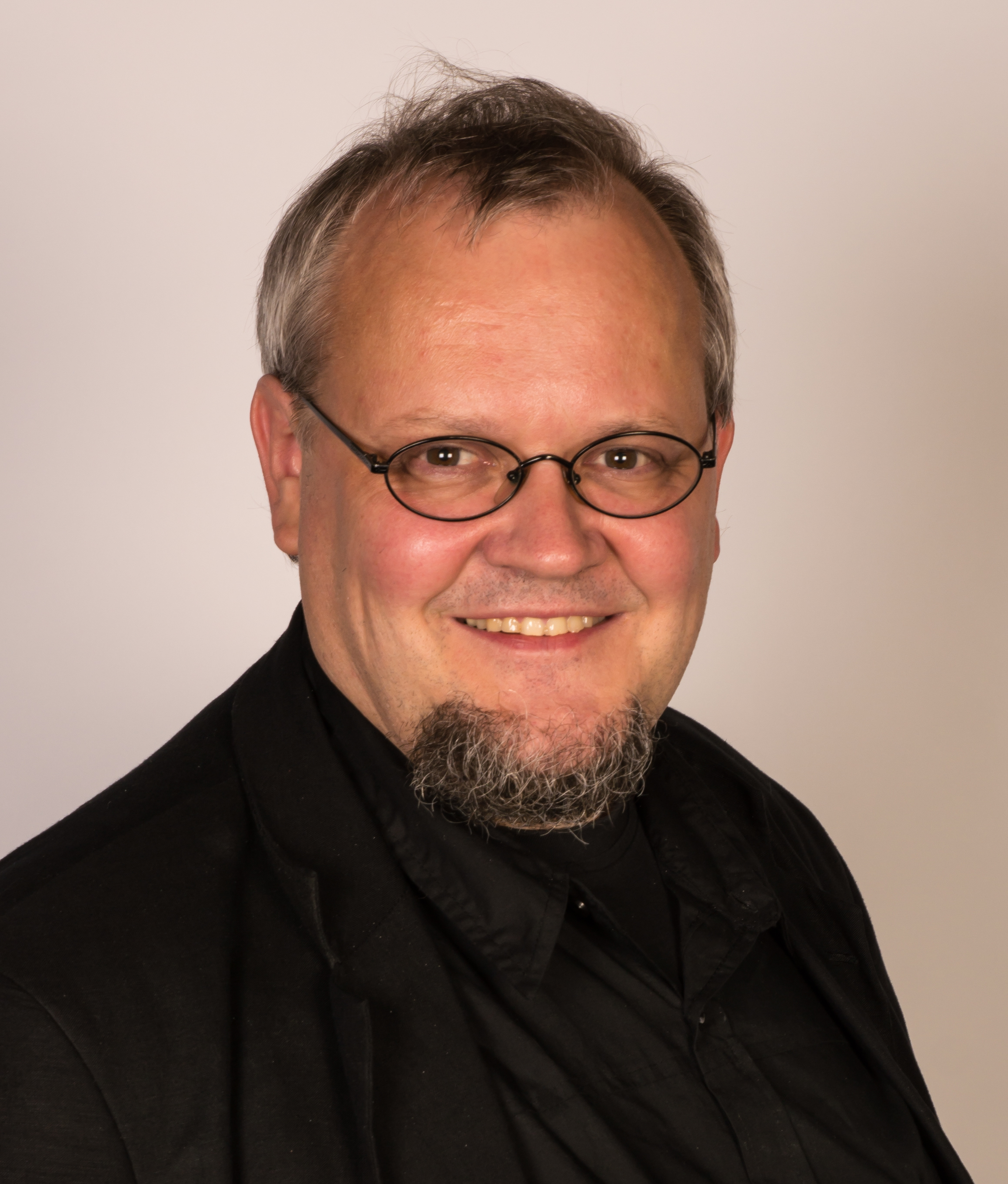
- Pflüger in 2014

Deputy Leader of The Left
- Incumbent
- Assumed office 11 May 2014 Serving with Ali Al-Dailami, Ates Gürpinar, Martina Renner, Katina Schubert, and Jana Seppelt

Member of the Bundestag
- In office 24 October 2017 – 26 October 2021
- Constituency: Baden-Württemberg

Member of the European Parliament
- In office 20 July 2004 – 21 July 2009
- Constituency: Germany

Personal details
- Born: Tobias Pflüger; 1 February 1965 (age 61) Stuttgart, Baden-Württemberg, West Germany
- Party: The Left
- Education: University of Tübingen

Tobias Pflüger (born 1 February 1965) is a German politician of The Left serving as one of six deputy leaders of the party since 2014. From 2017 to 2021 he was a member of the Bundestag, and from 2004 to 2009 a member of the European Parliament.

== Life and career ==
Pflüger's father was a pastor and his mother a catechist. He grew up in Möglingen, Calw, and Nagold, where he graduated from the Otto-Hahn-Gymnasium in 1985. He then studied political science and empirical cultural studies at the University of Tübingen.

Pflüger has been active in the peace movement since the 1980s. At the age of 16, he joined The Greens. From 1989 to 1993, he was research assistant to Christine Mussler-Frohne, a Green member of the Landtag of Baden-Württemberg, specialising in the anti-nuclear movement, energy, and peace policy.

In 1996, he co-founded the Information Centre on Militarisation (IMI). Until 2004 he was a member of the organisation's board and a consultant for domestic and foreign issues. For several years he was a member of the editorial board of the journal Science and Peace. From 1997 to 2003, he was co-editor and frequent author of the magazine Graswurzelrevolution. From January 2000 to December 2002, Pflüger held a doctoral fellowship from the Rosa Luxemburg Foundation, but did not submit a dissertation. Since late 2002, he has been an active member of the scientific advisory board of Attac.

He participated in the European Social Forum in Florence (2002), Paris (2003), London (2004), Athens (2006), and Malmö (2008), as well as the World Social Forum in Mumbai (2004), Porto Alegre (2005), Caracas (2006), and Nairobi (2007). In 2003 he participated in numerous events concerning the topics of German participation in the Iraq War, Bundeswehr and defence policy, militarism in the EU, and the EU Constitution, among others.

In January 2019, Pflüger was a guest on a Sea-Watch ship in the Mediterranean. The same year, he became a member of the Franco-German Parliamentary Assembly.

== Political career ==
Though originally a member of the Greens, Pflüger left the party in 2001. In the 2004 European Parliament election, he ran for the Party of Democratic Socialism (PDS), though he did not join the party. He was elected to the European Parliament and served on the Committee on Foreign Affairs. He ran for re-election in the 2009 European Parliament election in tenth place on The Left list, but was not elected.

In March 2006, Pflüger signed the founding appeal of the Anti-Capitalist Left, a radical internal faction of the PDS/Left. He joined The Left in May 2008. In May 2010, he became a member of the party executive; in 2014, he was elected co-deputy chairman of the party.

Pflüger ran for the Bundestag in fourth place on The Left list in the 2017 German federal election and was elected. He also stood in the constituency of Freiburg and won 7.3% of votes. In the 19th Bundestag, he was a member of the defence committee and a substitute member of the committees on foreign affairs and EU affairs.

He ran for the Bundestag again in the 2021 German federal election in sixth place on the Baden-Württemberg party list, but lost re-election.
