= Die Linke =

The Left Die Linke
- Chairpersons: Ines Schwerdtner; Luigi Pantisano
- Deputy Chairpersons: Ates Gürpinar; Luise Neuhaus-Wartenberg; Sabine Ritter; Maximilian Schirmer
- Leaders in the Bundestag: Heidi Reichinnek; Sören Pellmann
- Secretary: Janis Ehling
- Founded: 16 June 2007
- Merger of: PDS; WASG
- Headquarters: Karl-Liebknecht-Haus; Kleine Alexanderstraße 28; D-10178 Berlin
- Think tank: Rosa Luxemburg Foundation
- Student wing: Die Linke.SDS
- Youth wing: Left Youth Solid
- LGBTQ wing: DIE LINKE.queer
- Membership (September 2026): ▲131,500
- Ideology: Democratic socialism
- Political position: Left-wing
- European affiliation: Party of the European Left
- European Parliament group: The Left in the European Parliament
- Colours: Red (official) (Note: Used in the party logo and flag.); Purple (customary) (Note: Used by the German government in their parliamentary diagrams.)
- Bundestag: 64 / 630
- Bundesrat: 1 / 69
- State Parliaments: 103 / 1,875
- European Parliament: 3 / 96
- Heads of State Governments: 0 / 16

Party flag

Website
- die-linke.de
- Politics of Germany; Political parties; Elections; A: A broad left-wing party, it has also been described as far-left by several news outlets.

Die Linke ([diː ˈlɪŋkə]; lit. 'The Left'), also known as the Left Party (German: Linkspartei, pronounced [ˈlɪŋkspaʁˌtaɪ]), is a democratic socialist political party in Germany. The party was founded in 2007 as the result of the merger of the Party of Democratic Socialism (PDS) and Labour and Social Justice – The Electoral Alternative. Through the PDS, the party is the direct descendant of the Marxist–Leninist ruling party of former East Germany, the Socialist Unity Party of Germany (SED). Since June 2026, Die Linke's co-chairpersons have been Ines Schwerdtner and Luigi Pantisano. The party holds 64 seats out of 630 in the German federal parliament (the Bundestag), having won 8.8% of votes cast in the 2025 German federal election. Its parliamentary group is the smallest of five in the Bundestag, and is headed by parliamentary co-leaders Heidi Reichinnek and Sören Pellmann.

Die Linke is represented in seven of Germany's 16 state legislatures, including four of the five eastern states. As of 2026, the party participates in governments in the states of Bremen and Mecklenburg-Vorpommern as a junior partner. From 2014 to 2024 the party led a coalition in Thuringia with the Social Democratic Party and The Greens headed by Minister-President Bodo Ramelow. Die Linke is a founding member of the Party of the European Left, and is the fifth-largest party in The Left group in the European Parliament. In December 2025, Die Linke had 123,126 registered members. Die Linke promotes antimilitarism.

== History ==
=== Background ===
The main predecessor of Die Linke was the Party of Democratic Socialism (PDS), which emerged from the ruling Socialist Unity Party (SED) of East Germany (GDR). In October 1989, facing increasing unpopularity, the SED replaced long-time leader Erich Honecker with Egon Krenz, who began a program of limited reforms, including the legalisation of opposition groups. He also loosened restrictions on travel between East and West Berlin, which inadvertently led to the fall of the Berlin Wall. The SED gave up its "leading role" in November, and Krenz resigned soon afterward. He was succeeded by Gregor Gysi, part of a group of reformers who supported the Peaceful Revolution. His ally Hans Modrow, the new Chairman of the Council of Ministers, became the de facto national leader.

Seeking to change its image, the party expelled most of its former leadership, including Honecker and Krenz; the new government negotiated with opposition groups and arranged free elections. By the time of a special congress in mid-December, the SED was no longer a Marxist-Leninist party. It added Party of Democratic Socialism to its name, dropping the SED portion in February. The PDS oriented itself as pro-democratic, socialist, and supportive of East German sovereignty. The party chose Modrow as its lead candidate for the 1990 East German general election but was decisively defeated, finishing in third place with 16.4% of votes cast. The PDS was excluded from further political developments due to the aversion of the opposition, now in power, which considered it essentially tied to the Communist regime despite its change of name.

After debuting with a meagre 2.4% nationwide in the 1990 German federal election immediately after German reunification, the PDS gained popularity throughout the 1990s as a protest party in the eastern states. In the 1998 German federal election it won 5.1% of votes, enough to win seats outright without relying on direct constituencies as it had in 1994. By the 2000s, it was the second-largest party in every eastern state legislature except Mecklenburg-Vorpommern. Despite electoral successes, the PDS faced internal strife due to ideological disputes, a chronic decline in membership, and a near-complete lack of support in the western states, which has been home to 85% of Germany's population. The 1994 German federal election also saw a "red socks" campaign used by the centre-right, including the CDU/CSU and the Free Democratic Party (FDP), to scare off a possible red–red–green coalition (SPD–PDS–Greens). Analysts have stated that such a strategy likely paid off, as it was seen as one of the decisive elements for the narrow victory of Helmut Kohl for the CDU/CSU–FDP. The campaign was criticized as an obvious attempt to discredit the whole political left; the PDS reinterpreted it for itself by printing red socks.

=== PDS–WASG alliance ===
SPD
Spartacus League
KPD
SED
PDS | WASG
Die Linke
BSW

The predecessors of Die Linke, and its split-off, the Alliance for Social Justice and Economic Reason

In January 2005, a group of disaffected Social Democrats and trade unionists founded Labour and Social Justice – The Electoral Alternative (WASG), a left-wing party opposed to federal Chancellor Gerhard Schröder's Agenda 2010 labour and welfare reforms. The party made a modest showing of 2.2% in the North Rhine-Westphalia state election in May and failed to win seats. The election saw the incumbent SPD government defeated in a landslide, which was widely interpreted as a sign of the federal SPD's unpopularity. Chancellor Schröder subsequently called an early federal election to be held in September.

WASG continued to gain members, prompting the PDS leadership to propose an alliance between the two parties. With the established eastern base of the PDS and WASG's potential for growth in the west, the parties hoped to enter the Bundestag together. They agreed to form an electoral pact, in which they would not run against one another in direct constituencies and would create joint electoral lists featuring candidates from both parties. They also agreed to unify into a single party in 2007. To symbolise the new relationship, the PDS renamed itself the Left Party.PDS (German: Linkspartei.PDS). The joint list ran under the name The Left.PDS (German: Die Linke.PDS), though in the western states, where the PDS was shunned for its association with the GDR, "PDS" was optional. The alliance's profile was greatly boosted when former federal Minister of Finance Oskar Lafontaine, who had left the SPD after the North Rhine-Westphalia election, joined WASG in June. He was chosen as the party's lead candidate for the federal election and shared the spotlight with Gregor Gysi of the PDS.

Polls early in the summer showed the unified Left list winning as much as 12% of the vote, and for a time it seemed possible the party would surge past the Greens and FDP and become the third-largest party in the Bundestag. During the campaign, the party was subject to frequent criticism. At one event, Oskar Lafontaine described Fremdarbeiter (lit. 'foreign workers', a term associated with the Nazi regime) as a threat to German labour. He claimed to have misspoken, but in an article published in Die Welt, a group of prominent German writers accused him of deliberately appealing to xenophobic and far-right voters.

In the 2005 federal election, the Left PDS passed the electoral threshold, winning 8.7% of the vote and 53 seats. It became the fourth largest party in the Bundestag. The result of the election was inconclusive; between the SPD, Greens, and Left.PDS, left-wing parties held a majority, but the SPD was unwilling to cooperate with the Left.PDS. The result was a grand coalition of the CDU and SPD.

=== Party foundation ===
Negotiations for a formal merger of the PDS and WASG continued through the next year until a final agreement was reached on 27 March 2007. The new party, called The Left (Die Linke), held its founding congress in Berlin on 16 June 2007. Lothar Bisky and Oskar Lafontaine were elected as co-leaders, while Gregor Gysi became leader of the party's Bundestag group.

The unified party quickly became a serious force in western Germany for the first time. It surpassed the electoral threshold in Bremen in 2007, and throughout 2008 won seats in Lower Saxony, Hesse and Hamburg. The "five-party system" in Germany was now a reality in the west as well as the east.

In 2009, Die Linke achieved 7.5% in the European elections. Six state elections were held throughout the year. The party saw an upswing in Thuringia and Hesse and won seats for the first time in Schleswig-Holstein and Saarland. Oskar Lafontaine ran as the lead candidate in Saarland, leading the party to its best result in a western state with 21.3% of the vote. In Saxony and Brandenburg, Die Linke's vote declined slightly, but it remained the second largest party in both states.

=== 2009 federal election ===
Results for the second votes by constituency in the 2009 federal election

The electoral collapse of the Social Democratic Party in the federal election on 27 September 2009 saw Die Linke's vote rise to 11.9%, increasing its representation in the Bundestag from 54 to 76 seats, just under half as large as the SPD's parliamentary group. It became the second most popular party in the eastern states with 28.5%, while experiencing a breakthrough in the west with 8.3%. It was the most popular party in Saxony-Anhalt and Brandenburg, and won 16 direct constituencies. Die Linke nonetheless remained in opposition.

Die Linke won seats in the parliament of Germany's most populous state, North Rhine-Westphalia, in the May 2010 election. They now held seats in 13 of Germany's 16 states, only absent from three states in the traditionally conservative south.

In January 2010, Oskar Lafontaine announced that, due to his ongoing cancer treatment, he would not seek re-election to the party leadership at the upcoming party congress. At the congress in May, Lothar Bisky also chose not to nominate for re-election. Klaus Ernst and Gesine Lötzsch were elected as the party's new leaders.

A few weeks later, the SPD and Greens invited Die Linke to support their candidate for the 2010 presidential election, the independent Joachim Gauck, who had been an anti-communist civil rights activist in East Germany and, from 1991 to 2000, the first Federal Commissioner for the Stasi Records. They suggested that this was an opportunity for Die Linke to leave their communist past behind them and show unconditional support for democracy. However, the party refused to support him, highlighting his support of the War in Afghanistan and his attacks on their party. They also rejected the conservative Christian Wulff, favourite of Chancellor Angela Merkel, instead putting forward their own nominee, television journalist Luc Jochimsen. The red-green camp reacted with disappointment. SPD chairman Sigmar Gabriel described Die Linke's position as "bizarre and embarrassing", stating that he was shocked that they would declare Joachim Gauck their enemy due to his investigation of GDR injustice. The SPD and Greens expected Die Linke to support Gauck in the decisive third round of the election; however, after Jochimsen withdrew, most of Die Linke's delegates abstained. Wulff was elected by an absolute majority.

The party was isolated ahead of the March 2012 presidential election. The federal CDU/CSU–FDP government invited the SPD and Greens to agree on an all-party consensus candidate; Die Linke was excluded. Those invited eventually agreed to support Joachim Gauck. Die Linke again refused to support him. SPD chair Sigmar Gabriel once again criticised the party, claiming that they harboured "sympathy for the German Democratic Republic" and were upset over Gauck's role in the investigations about the crimes of the Stasi. Die Linke put forward Beate Klarsfeld, a journalist and outspoken anti-fascist who had investigated numerous Nazi war criminals. She received 10.2% of the delegate votes. Gauck was elected in the first round with 80.4% of votes.

Die Linke's fortunes began to turn in 2011, and they suffered a string of setbacks and defeats through 2013, particularly in the western states. They failed to win seats in Rhineland-Palatinate and Baden-Württemberg, and suffered losses in Bremen, Berlin, and Saarland. Crucially, the party lost its seats in the Landtags of Schleswig-Holstein, North Rhine-Westphalia, and Lower Saxony.

On 11 April 2012, Gesine Lötzsch resigned as party co-leader, citing medical conditions her husband was suffering. Klaus Ernst subsequently announced he would not seek re-election as leader at the party congress in June. Katja Kipping, who had served as deputy leader since 2007, was elected as co-leader with 67.1% of votes. Bernd Riexinger was elected as the other co-leader with 53.5% of votes, winning a narrow contest against Dietmar Bartsch.

=== 2013 federal election ===
Results for the second votes by constituency in the 2013 federal election

In the 2013 federal election, Die Linke received 8.6% of the national vote and won 64 seats, a decline from 2009. However, due to the collapse of the FDP, they moved into third place. After the formation of a second grand coalition between the CDU and SPD, Die Linke became the leading party of the opposition.

The party narrowly retained its seats in the Hessian state election held on the same day as the federal election. Die Linke suffered a major loss in Brandenburg in 2014, losing a third of its voteshare and falling to third place. Nonetheless, it continued as a junior partner under the SPD.

The 2014 Thuringian state election was the party's biggest success to date, achieving not only its best state election result (28.2%) but also forming the first coalition with one of its own members at the head. The party was able to negotiate a red–red–green coalition with the SPD and Greens, and Bodo Ramelow was elected Minister-President by the Landtag of Thuringia, becoming the first member of the party to serve as head of government of any German state.

Die Linke achieved modest gains in the city-states of Hamburg and Bremen in 2015. They suffered a loss in Saxony-Anhalt reminiscent of that in Brandenburg 18 months earlier, falling to third place and losing a third of their voteshare. In September, Die Linke joined government in Berlin after the 2016 state election as the second-largest member of a coalition with the SPD and Greens.

=== 2017 federal election ===
Results for the second votes by constituency in the 2017 federal election

In the 2017 federal election, Die Linke fell to fifth place due to the re-entry of the FDP in fourth place and the ascension of AfD to third place. The party suffered substantial losses in its traditional eastern heartland, but made a net gain nationally thanks to an improvement in the western states, rising to 9.2% of votes (up 0.6 points).

Throughout 2017, they failed to make a comeback to the Landtags of Schleswig-Holstein, North Rhine-Westphalia, and Lower Saxony, despite making gains in all three states. The party's slow decline in Saarland continued, winning 12.8% in March. In 2018, they defended their seats in Hesse. Kipping and Riexinger were re-elected for a third time at the party congress in 2018, winning 64.5% and 73.8% respectively.

Die Linke had mixed results in 2019. In the European election, they declined to 5.5%, the worst result in a national election since the party's formation. In the Bremen state election held on the same day, the party made small gains, and joined a western state government for the first time in a coalition under the SPD and Greens. Die Linke suffered major losses in the Brandenburg and Saxony state elections held on 1 September, losing almost half its voteshare in each, and left the Brandenburg government, in which they had participated since 2009.

In the 2019 Thuringian state election, Ramelow led the party to its best ever result, winning 31.0% and becoming the largest party in a state legislature for the first time, though his red-red-green government lost its majority. In February 2020, the FDP's Thomas Kemmerich was elected Minister-President with the support of AfD and the CDU, but immediately resigned due to widespread outrage. After a protracted government crisis, Ramelow was re-elected for a second term to lead a minority government.

In August 2020, Kipping and Riexinger announced they would step down as co-chairs in accordance with party regulations stating that no position should be held by the same person for more than eight years. A party congress was scheduled on 30 October to 1 November 2020, but was cancelled on 27 October due to the worsening of the COVID-19 pandemic in Germany; the party instead held a fully digital congress on 26–27 February 2021. Hessian parliamentary leader Janine Wissler and Thuringia branch leader Susanne Hennig-Wellsow were elected co-chairs on 27 February, winning 84% and 71% of votes cast, respectively.

=== 2021 federal election ===
During the 2021 German federal election, Die Linke was eager to become a partner in a coalition government with the SPD and Greens. As the CDU/CSU collapsed in the polls and the SPD surged, the last month of the campaign saw the conservative government engage in a Red Scare campaign against Die Linke and the prospect of a red–red–green coalition, utilising red-baiting and fearmongering about extremism; the party had elected a new moderate leadership and put forward an observably more moderate programme than previous elections. A capital flight to Switzerland ensued due to fear of increased taxes for the wealthy through higher inheritance tax and a wealth tax.

Die Linke won 4.9% of votes and 39 seats in the 26 September federal election, its worst showing since its official formation in 2007, narrowly failing to cross the 5% electoral threshold. The party was nonetheless entitled to full proportional representation as it won three direct constituencies; two in Berlin and one in Leipzig. This meant a net loss of 4.3% of vote share and 30 seats overall. Notably, Vice President of the Bundestag Petra Pau was defeated in her direct constituency of Berlin-Marzahn – Hellersdorf. Due to Die Linke's poor performance, a left-wing coalition fell a few seats short of a majority in the Bundestag.

State elections in Berlin and Mecklenburg-Vorpommern were held on the same day. Die Linke suffered minor losses in both, but nonetheless joined coalition governments in each state. In Berlin, they joined a renewed coalition with the SPD and Greens. In Mecklenburg-Vorpommern, they replaced the CDU as junior partner to the SPD.

After the federal election, Die Linke suffered internal strife and its fortunes continued to decline. A major blow came in the March 2022 Saarland state election, with the party losing all their seats amid conflict between the state leadership and Oskar Lafontaine, who declined to run again and quit the party shortly before the election. Further, reports of sexism and abuse arose within the Hesse branch, including claims that implicated Janine Wissler. In April, Susanne Hennig-Wellsow resigned as co-leader, citing the party's recent troubles and desire to spend more time with family. Further losses came in the Schleswig-Holstein and North Rhine-Westphalia state elections in May.

=== 2022–2025: infighting and party split ===
The 2022 Russian invasion of Ukraine highlighted fault lines within the party. The leadership and majority took a strongly pro-Ukrainian stance, while the faction around Sahra Wagenknecht opposed sanctions against Russia. At the party congress in June, incumbent Janine Wissler was re-elected as leader, while co-chair of The Left in the European Parliament (GUE/NGL) group Martin Schirdewan was elected as Hennig-Wellsow's successor. They both faced challenges from candidates aligned with Wagenknecht's faction, winning majorities of 57% and 61% of votes respectively.

During a Bundestag speech in September, Wagenknecht attacked the federal government for launching what she called "an unprecedented economic war against our most important energy supplier", and called for the end of sanctions against Russia. The speech was boycotted by half Die Linke's deputies, and prompted numerous calls for her resignation by colleagues. Hundreds of members were reported to have left the party over the dispute, including prominent former Bundestag member Fabio De Masi. Die Tageszeitung reported that Wagenknecht's supporters had begun planning a breakaway party to compete in the 2024 European elections.

In the 2023 Berlin state election, Die Linke lost two seats in the Berlin House of Representatives; further, in the 2023 Bremen state election, they retained their 10 seats in the Bürgerschaft of Bremen. In the 2023 Hessian state election, Die Linke were wiped out after achieving 3.1% of the vote, thus losing their 9 seats due to falling short of the 5% threshold needed for representation.

In October 2023, Wagenknecht and nine other Bundestag members, including faction co-leader Amira Mohamed Ali and former federal leader Klaus Ernst, announced their intention to leave Die Linke and launch a new party, the Sahra Wagenknecht Alliance. This pushed Die Linke below the minimum number of members required to sustain an official faction in the Bundestag, and it was preemptively dissolved on 6 December. In February it was reorganised as a group with reduced status. Former faction leader Dietmar Bartsch declined to run again. Heidi Reichinnek and Sören Pellmann, who previously ran against Wissler and Schirdewan for the federal leadership, announced their intention to contest against the pro-leadership duo of Clara Bünger and Ates Gürpinar. On the first ballot, Reichinnek defeated Bünger 14 votes to 13; Gürpinar withdrew in favour of Bünger in the second ballot, but she was defeated again by Pellmann, again 14 to 13.

Die Linke suffered its worst ever result in a nationwide election at the 2024 European elections in June, winning only 2.7% of the vote and three seats. Wissler and Schirdewan announced the next month that they would not seek re-election at the upcoming party congress.

In September, the party suffered major defeats in state elections in Brandenburg, Saxony and Thuringia. They were reduced to fourth place in Thuringia with 13%, while in Brandenburg and Saxony they fell below 5%, only narrowly retaining their seats in the latter state. BSW, conversely, performed strongly and placed third in each state. In October, the party congress elected Ines Schwerdtner and Jan van Aken as the new co-leaders with only marginal opposition. By 31 December 2024, the number of party members had grown to 58,532 (after it had fallen from 54,214 by the end of 2022 to 50,251 by the end of 2023).

=== 2025 federal election ===
Die Linke support in the 2025 German federal election

By the time the early federal election was called in December 2024, Die Linke was polling around 3% and was not generally expected to return to the Bundestag. The party nominated Jan van Aken and Heidi Reichinnek as lead candidates for the campaign. In light of their poor polling, they also promoted a trio of candidates for the direct constituencies: Gregor Gysi, Bodo Ramelow, and Dietmar Bartsch, aiming to bypass the 5% electoral threshold. This effort was dubbed Mission Silberlocke ("silver locks") in reference to their age.

Die Linke experienced an unexpected rise in support during the campaign, surging to 6–7% a week before the election. Heidi Reichinnek delivered a speech in late January in the Bundestag strongly condemning CDU leader Friedrich Merz's legislative collaboration with the Alternative for Germany, which subsequently went viral on social media. This was followed by a surge in popularity and membership for the party, particularly among women and young people. Polling suggested it could become the most popular party among voters aged 18–24. Reichinnek's campaign appearances and speeches surged in attendance, with media referring to her as a "social media star". The party's staunch opposition to the AfD, housing and tax policy, pro-immigrant attitude, and disillusion with the other left-wing parties were cited as potential points of strength in the campaign. The contrast between Die Linke and the BSW has been discussed in the media.

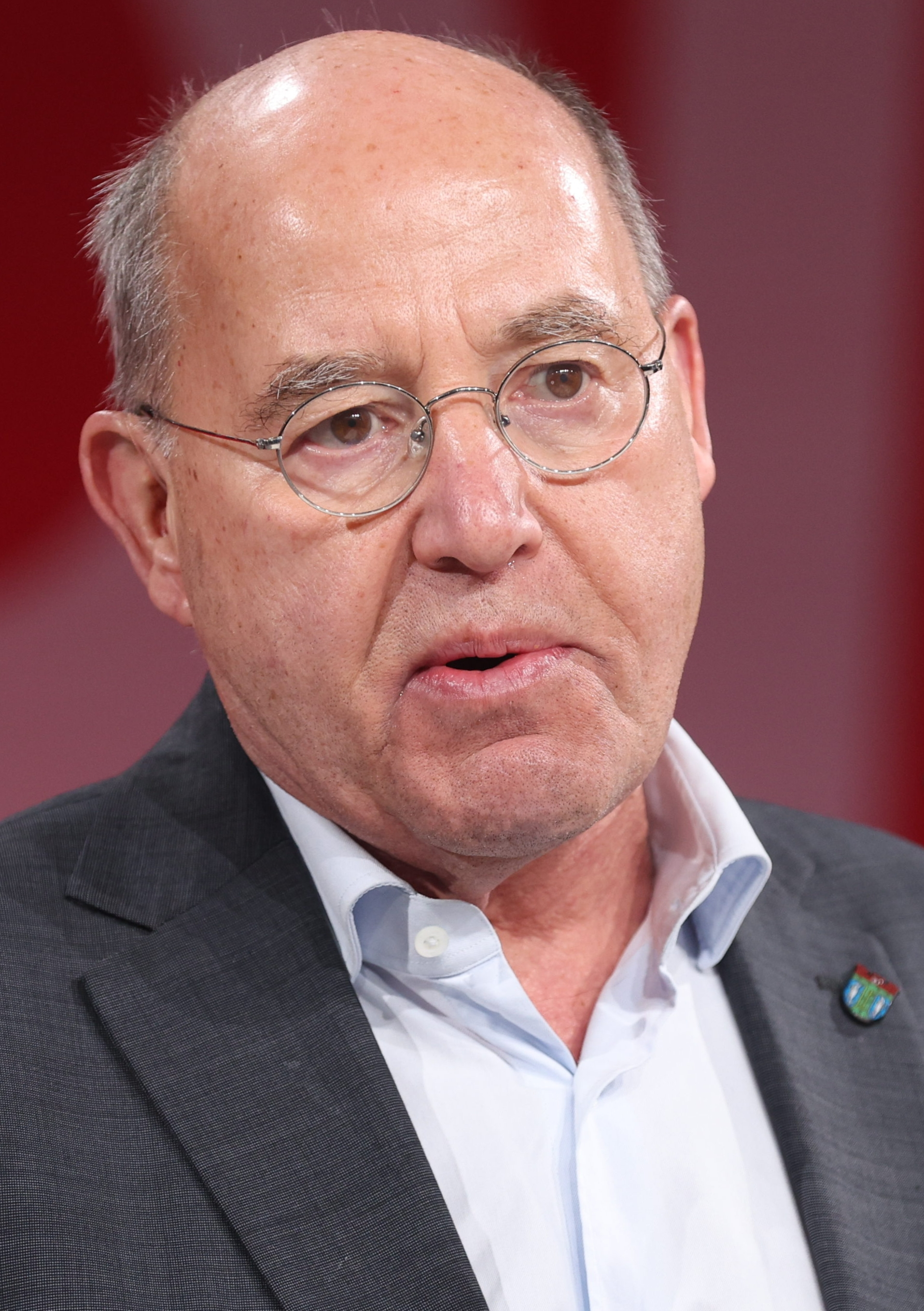
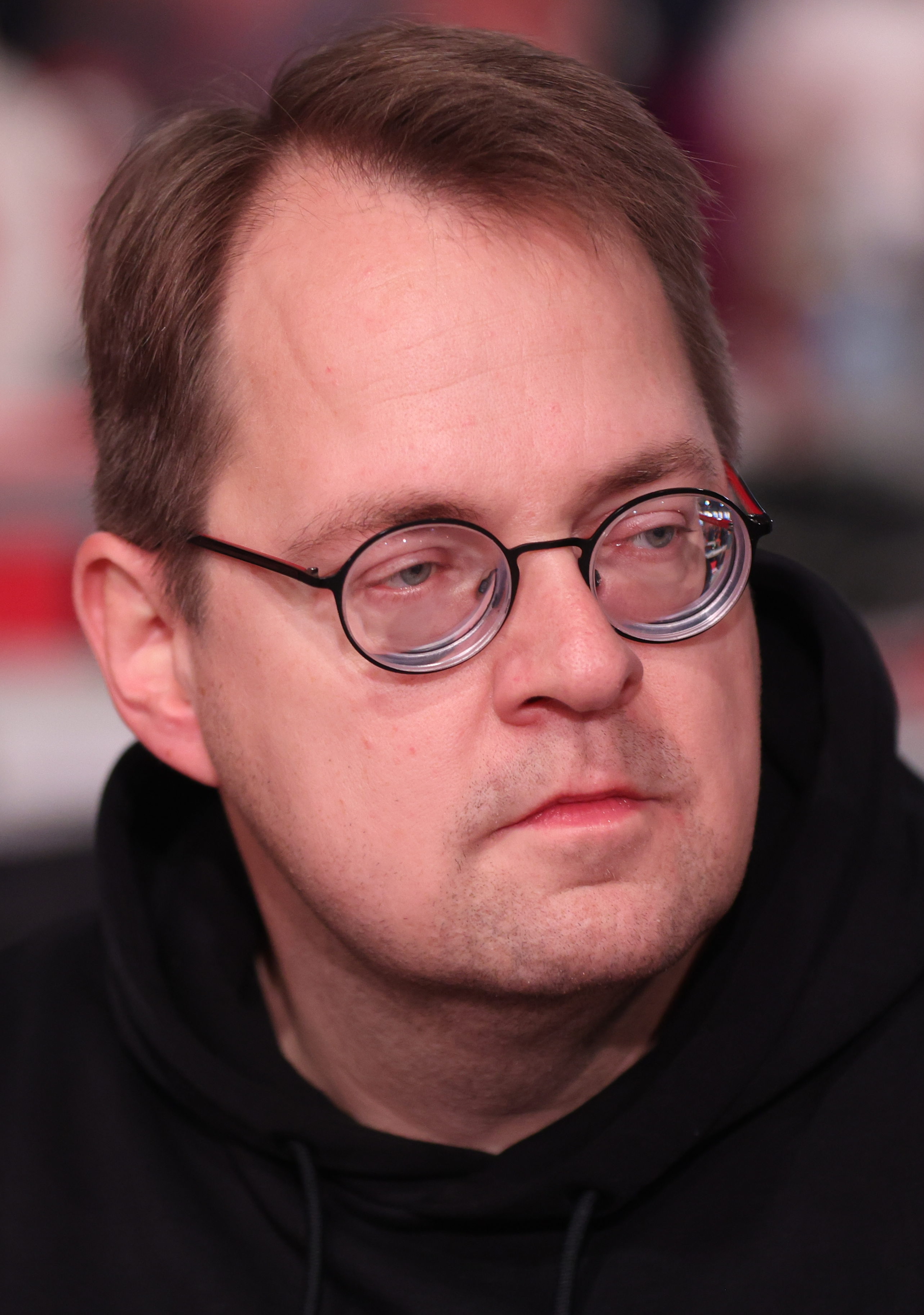
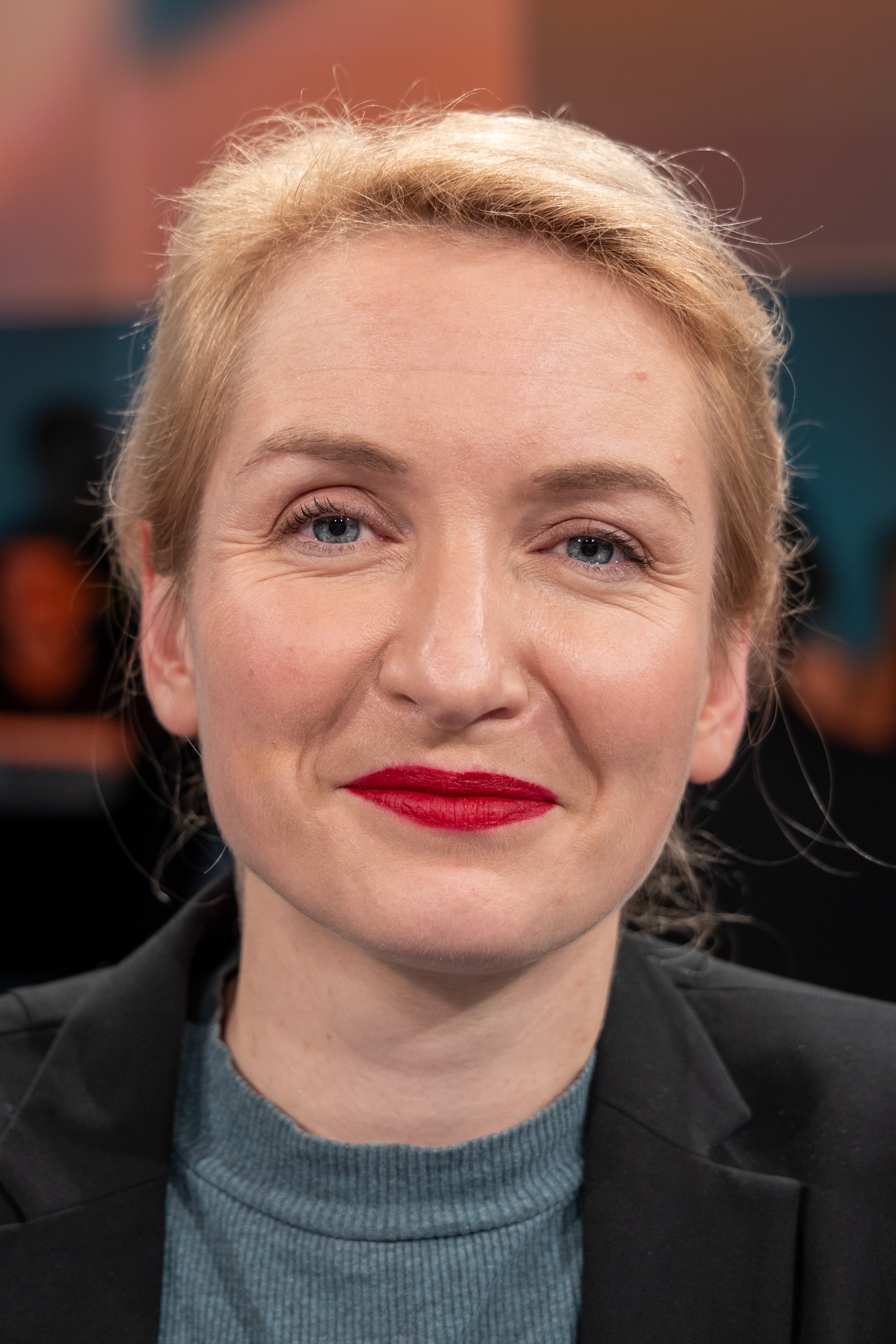
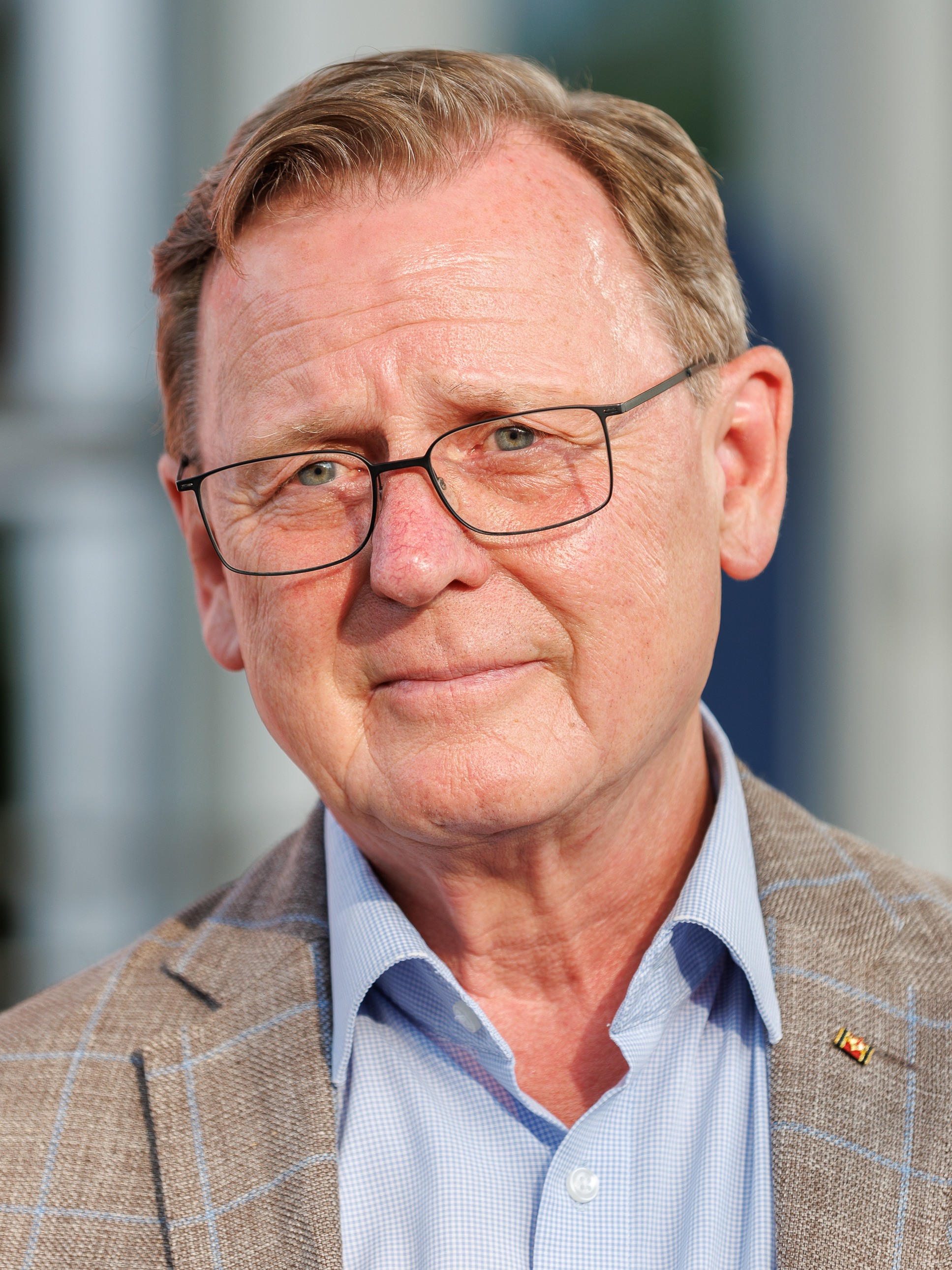
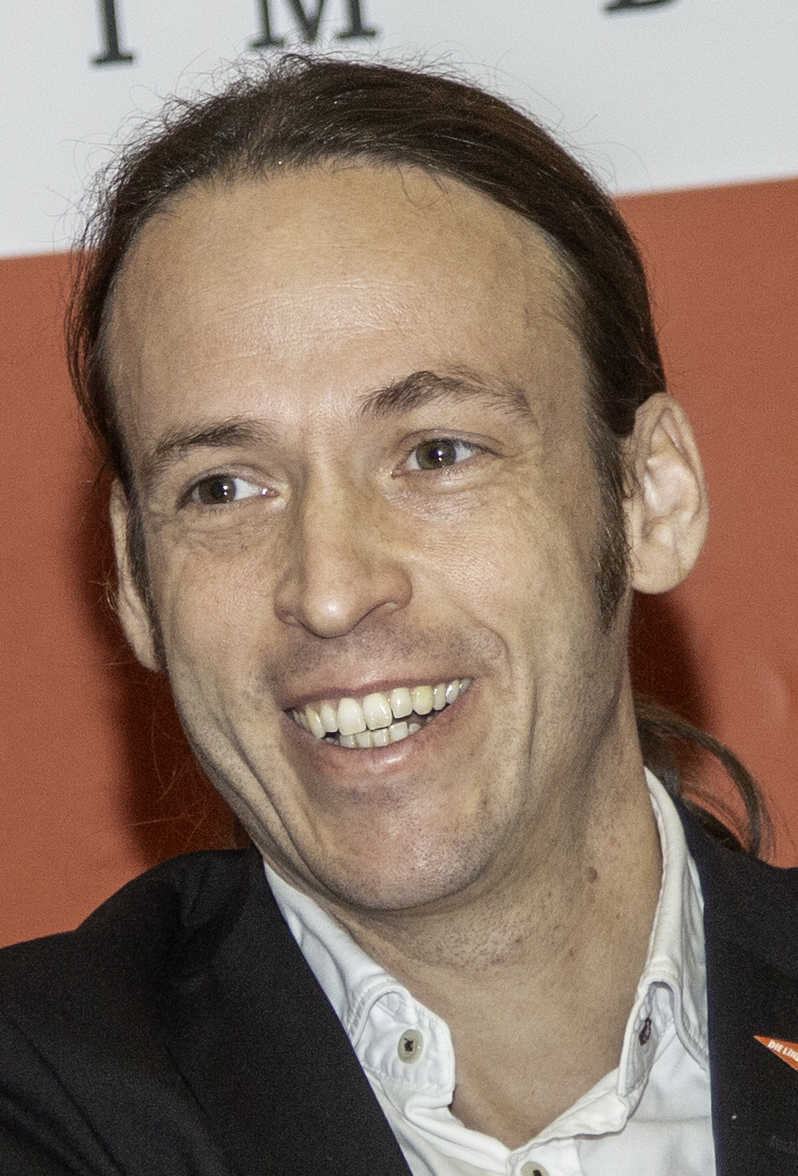
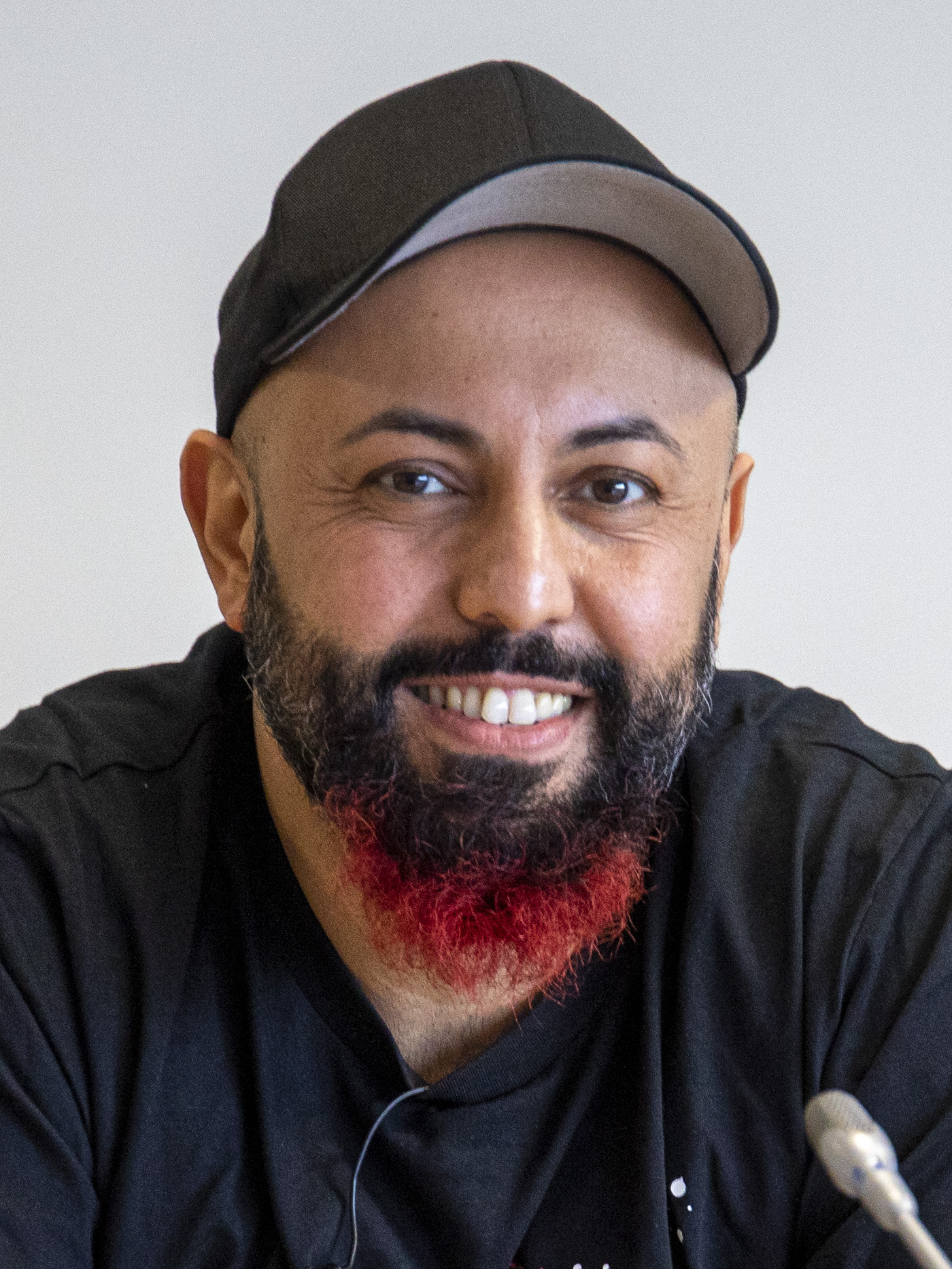
Six LINKE members won direct constituencies in 2025. They are, clockwise from top left:
- Gregor Gysi, Sören Pellmann, and Ines Schwerdtner defended Berlin-Treptow – Köpenick, Leipzig II, and Berlin-Lichtenberg respectively. Incumbent Gesine Lötzsch retired in Lichtenberg.
- Ferat Koçak, Pascal Meiser, and Bodo Ramelow flipped Berlin-Neukölln, Berlin-Friedrichshain-Kreuzberg – Prenzlauer Berg East, and Erfurt – Weimar – Weimarer Land II respectively.

In the election on 23 February 2025, Die Linke won 8.8% of the vote and 64 seats, their best result since 2017. The party won six direct constituencies, including those of Gregor Gysi, Sören Pellmann, and Bodo Ramelow, as well as three newcomers in Berlin: Ines Schwerdtner in Lichtenberg, Pascal Meiser in Friedrichshain-Kreuzberg, and Ferat Koçak in Neukölln. This latter victory marked the first time Die Linke had won a constituency in the former West. Exit polling indicated that Die Linke was the most popular party among voters aged 18–24, winning 25% of this group, and 16% among voters aged 25–34. The party gained primarily from Greens and SPD voters, as well as from minor party and non-voters, while losing a lesser number of votes to the BSW.

== Ideology and platform ==
Die Linke advocates for democratic socialism as an alternative to capitalism. Die Linke is vocally anti-militarist. As a platform for left-wing politics in the wake of globalization, Die Linke includes many different factions, ranging from communists to social democrats. During the joint party convention with the Labour and Social Justice – The Electoral Alternative in March 2007, a document outlining political principles was agreed on. The official program of the party was decided upon by an overwhelming majority at the party conference in October 2011 in Erfurt.

Die Linke is sometimes considered part of the German "centre-left" camp. It has been described as far-left by journalists in some news outlets including the BBC, Euronews, The Guardian, Der Spiegel, Politico, and The New York Times.

=== Economic policy ===
Die Linke aims at increasing government spending in the areas of public investments, education, research and development, culture, and infrastructure, as well as increasing taxes for large corporations. It calls for increases in inheritance tax rates and the reinstatement of the individual net worth tax. The party aims at a linear income tax progression, which would reduce the tax burden for lower incomes, while raising the middle- and top-income tax rates. The combating of tax loopholes is a perennial issue, as Die Linke believes that they primarily benefit people with high incomes. The party aims for the financial markets to be subject to heavier government regulation, with the goal, among others, to reduce the speculation of bonds and derivatives. The party wants to strengthen anti-trust laws and empower cooperatives to decentralise the economy. Further economic reforms supported by the party include solidarity and more self-determination for workers, a ban on hydraulic fracturing, the rejection of privatization, and the introduction of a federal minimum wage, and more generally the overthrow of property and power structures in which, citing Karl Marx's aphorism, "man is a debased, enslaved, abandoned, despicable essence."

=== Foreign policy ===
Concerning foreign policy, Die Linke calls for international disarmament, while ruling out any form of involvement of the Bundeswehr outside of Germany. The party calls for the withdrawal of U.S. troops from Germany, as well as the replacement of NATO with a collective security system including Russia as a member country. They believe that German foreign policy should be strictly confined to the goals of civil diplomacy and cooperation, instead of confrontation, though they also believe that such demands are more of a vision, are not to be implemented as soon as possible, and should not be seen as inflexible preconditions for a federal, left-wing red–red–green coalition.

In their manifesto, the party says: "All support for NATO states which, like Erdoğan's Turkey, disregard international law, must be stopped immediately." Die Linke criticised Germany's defense plan with Saudi Arabia, which has been waging war in Yemen and has been accused of massive human rights violations. Die Linke supports further debt cancellations for developing countries and increases in development aid, in collaboration with the United Nations, World Trade Organization, World Bank, and diverse bilateral treaties among countries. The party supports reform of the United Nations as long as it is aimed at a fair balance between developed and developing countries. Die Linke would have all American military bases within Germany, and if possible in the European Union, enacted within a binding treaty, dissolved. Die Linke welcomes European integration, while opposing what it considers to be neoliberal policies in the European Union. The party strives for the democratisation of the EU institutions and a stronger role of the United Nations in international politics. Die Linke opposed both the war in Afghanistan and the Iraq War, as well as the Treaty of Lisbon.

==== Russia ====
The party has a mixed stance towards the Russo-Ukrainian War. Gregor Gysi has described Russia as state capitalist, and the party has called the annexation of Crimea by the Russian Federation and the Russian military intervention in Ukraine illegal; however, Gysi commented that older elements of the party have a strong penchant for Russia and the Soviet Union. The party declared in May 2014 that Ukraine should not receive any kind of support from Germany as long as there are fascists inside its government. Some members and former members of the party (like MP Andrej Hunko, who has since left the party and joined BSW) are strong supporters of the Donetsk People's Republic and Luhansk People's Republic.

==== China ====
The party takes a friendly stance towards China; Sevim Dağdelen, former deputy leader of Die Linke in the Bundestag (now BSW), criticized EU commission president Ursula von der Leyen's speech calling for a new EU policy towards China, saying that "the EU and its member states want to challenge the emerging power China, including through military means."

==== Israel ====
On 22 October 2023, in the wake of Hamas's attack on Israel, Martin Schirdewan, former co-chair of Die Linke, spoke at a Berlin demonstration in solidarity with Israel.

During a Berlin party congress on 11 October 2024, the Berlin party branch passed a resolution condemning Hamas's attack on Israel, declaring that Hamas's attack does not justify that the Israeli military breaks international law, affirming Israel's right to exist, accusing the anti-Zionist left of antisemitism, calling for the release of all hostages held by Hamas, demanding that the German government stops the supply of weapons to Israel, and expressing support for a two-state solution. A week later and after heated discussions, the federal party congress approved a different declaration, in which they welcomed "the International Court of Justice's efforts to prevent a genocide", and the references to the anti-Zionist left were watered down. In disagreement with the federal resolution, five prominent members from Berlin abandoned the party.

In December 2024, the Palestinian-German activist Ramsis Kilani was expelled from Die Linke by a party arbitration panel for alleged antisemitism reported by Der Tagesspiegel, which critics of Die Linke's alleged pro-Israel stance claim is distorted, falsified, and taken out of context. Der Tagesspiegel was previously found in court to have falsely accused a pro-Palestinian art venue of antisemitism. In 2014, Kilani's father and five siblings were killed in an Israeli attack in Gaza.

Die Linke criticized Friedrich Merz's decision to invite Israeli Prime Minister Benjamin Netanyahu to Germany, due to an arrest warrant issued against him by the International Criminal Court (ICC). Jan van Aken said, "If Vladimir Putin comes to Germany, then this arrest warrant must be implemented. The same applies to Netanyahu."

== Organisation ==
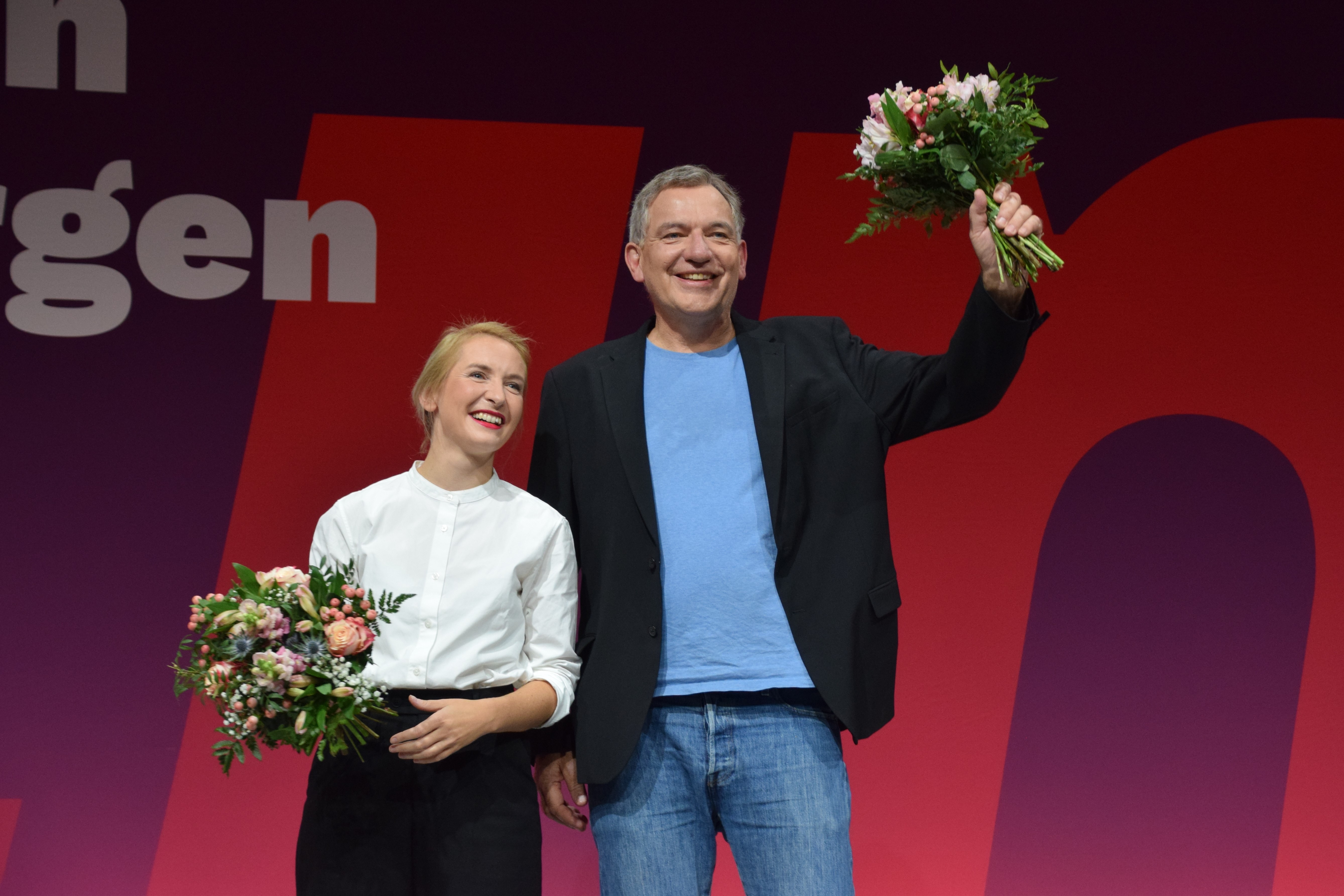
Ines Schwerdtner (left) and Jan van Aken at the 2024 federal party conference

Die Linke is organised into branches in each of the 16 states. The party has smaller branches on a local level, for which the corresponding state branches are responsible. These branches usually organise across a district, city, or (in Berlin) borough. The lowest unit of the party is the grassroots organization, which, depending on the density of membership, can include a residential area, a city or an entire district. The party has a youth wing, Left Youth Solid, and a student wing known as The Left.SDS. The party is also affiliated with a number of left-wing think tanks, education, and policy groups, most prominently the Rosa Luxemburg Foundation.

The party is formally led by a 26-member Party Executive Committee (PEC), of which seven are members of the party's leadership, the executive board. This includes two federal co-chairpersons, of which at least one is required by statute to be female. Convention also dictates that one leader should come from the Eastern states and one from the west, though this is not an official rule. The PEC is elected by a regular party congress, which also discusses and determines the party platform and rules on basic political and organisational matters. The leadership group of the party's Bundestag faction is considered a second centre of power within the party, and conflicts sometimes arise between the federal leadership and parliamentary group. This most prominently happened in 2015, which resulted in Bundestag co-leaders Sahra Wagenknecht and Dietmar Bartsch being elected as lead candidates for the 2017 federal election, defeating federal co-chairs Katja Kipping and Bernd Riexinger.

Die Linke's internal structure underwent a transitional phase after its formation in 2007 in order to integrate the different groups. Western party organisations were initially strongly favoured in party congresses, which strengthened the "fundamental opposition" faction of Oskar Lafontaine. These provisions expired at the 2014 party congress. The dual leadership, initially a temporary measure, was adopted permanently in 2010. This was not initially the case for the parliamentary group leadership, which was co-chaired by both Gregor Gysi and Lafontaine between 2005 and 2009, and solely by Gysi thereafter. After his retirement in 2015, however, the dual chairmanship was reintroduced. The executive committee originally comprised 44 members, but was reduced to 26 at the 2022 party congress.

Die Linke is noted for having an unusually strong and formalised system of internal factions, which are outlined in the party statutes. Factions with sufficiently large membership are entitled to send delegates to party congresses. In addition, there are around 40 working groups within the party.

Since October 2024, the composition of the Party Executive Committee has been as follows:

| Position | Member(s) |
|---|---|
| Party Chair | Ines Schwerdtner; Jan van Aken |
| Deputy Party Chair | Ates Gürpinar; Luise Neuhaus-Wartenberg; Sabine Ritter; Maximilian Schirmer |
| Federal Manager Officer | Janis Ehling |
| Federal Treasurer | Sebastian Koch |
| Youth Speaker | Lisa Pfitzmann |
| Student Speaker | Margarita Kavali |
| Member of the Party Executive Committee | Sabine Berninger; Candy Boldt-Händel; Lorenz Gösta Beutin; Katharina Dahme; Ulrike Eifler; Nina Eumann; Olga Fritzsche; Wulf Gallert; Kathrin Gebel; Margit Glasow; Thies Gleiss; Theo Glauch; Hennis Herbst; Alexander Kauz; Markus Pohle; Naisan Raji |

The Council of Elders (Ältestenrat) is an advisory body formed in December 2007. Lothar Bisky stated the council would "focus on the development of the party, allied and international issues, the history of the left and possible consequences for the socialist program." Its current composition is as follows:

| Position | Member(s) |
|---|---|
| Speakers | Bernhard Strasdeit; Luc Jochimsen |
| Member of the Council of Elders | Klaus Bartl; Heike Benz; Klaus-Wilhelm Depker; Minka Dott; Michael Finger; Helene Füllgraf; Stefan Glander; Roland Klaus; Wolfgang Methling; Peter Michely; Cornelia Möhring; Heidi Scharf; Renate Schmidt; Christiane Schneider; Volker Steinke; Gudrun Tietge; Tanju Tügel; Peter Vetter |

=== Leadership history ===
| Federal chairpersons | | Term start | Term end |
|---|---|---|---|
| Lothar Bisky | Oskar Lafontaine | 16 June 2007 | 15 May 2010 |
| Gesine Lötzsch | Klaus Ernst | 15 May 2010 | 2 June 2012 |
| Katja Kipping | Bernd Riexinger | 2 June 2012 | 27 February 2021 |
| Susanne Hennig-Wellsow | Janine Wissler | 27 February 2021 | 20 April 2022 |
| Vacant | Janine Wissler | 20 April 2022 | 25 June 2022 |
| Martin Schirdewan | Janine Wissler | 25 June 2022 | 19 October 2024 |
| Ines Schwerdtner | Jan van Aken | 19 October 2024 | Incumbent |

| Bundestag chairpersons | | Term start | Term end |
|---|---|---|---|
| Gregor Gysi | Oskar Lafontaine | 18 October 2005 | 27 October 2009 |
| Gregor Gysi | | 27 October 2009 | 13 October 2015 |
| Dietmar Bartsch | Sahra Wagenknecht | 13 October 2015 | 12 November 2019 |
| Dietmar Bartsch | Amira Mohamed Ali | 12 November 2019 | 6 December 2023 |
| Heidi Reichinnek | Sören Pellmann | 19 February 2024 | Incumbent |

=== State branches ===
The party has branches in all 16 states. As of 31 December 2025, the membership of the branches is as follows.

| State | Branch | Leader(s) | Members |
|---|---|---|---|
| Baden-Württemberg | | Sahra Mirow; Elwis Capece | ▲10,348 |
| Bavaria | | Sarah Vollath; Martin Bauhof | ▲9,563 |
| Berlin | | Kerstin Wolter; Maximilian Schirmer | ▲17,085 |
| Brandenburg | The Left Brandenburg | Katharina Slanina | ▲5,514 |
| Bremen | | Anna Fischer; Christoph Spehr | ▲1,901 |
| Hamburg | | Sabine Ritter; Thomas Iwan | ▲5,529 |
| Hesse | | Desiree Becker; Jakob Migenda | ▲8,299 |
| Lower Saxony | | Hilke Hochheiden; Thorben Peters | ▲9,473 |
| Mecklenburg-Vorpommern | | Hennis Herbst | ▲3,480 |
| North Rhine-Westphalia | The Left North Rhine-Westphalia | Kathrin Vogler; Sascha H. Wagner | ▲22,864 |
| Rhineland-Palatinate | | Rebecca Ruppert | ▲3,824 |
| Saarland | | Florian Spaniol | ▲1,675 |
| Saxony | | Marco Böhme; Anja Eichhorn | ▲11,362 |
| Saxony-Anhalt | | Janina Böttger; Hendrik Lange | ▲4,122 |
| Schleswig-Holstein | | Jana Lemke; Gerrit Schienke | ▲3,613 |
| Thuringia | | Katja Maurer; Ralf Plötner | ▲4,474 |
| Total | | | ▲123,126 |

=== Internal factions ===
Die Linke is noted for having an unusually strong and formalised system of internal factions, which are outlined in the party statutes. Factions with sufficiently large membership are entitled to send delegates to party congresses. The party is traditionally split between reformist factions, such as the Reform Left Network and Forum for Democratic Socialism, and orthodox factions such as the Communist Platform, Anti-Capitalist Left, and Socialist Left. The Emancipatory Left occupies a middle position.

However, starting from 2015, the party underwent an internal realignment due to the preeminence of Sahra Wagenknecht, who advocated a return to a fundamentally working-class focus and populist positions in the wake of the 2015 European migrant crisis and rise of the Alternative for Germany. In response, many eastern reformers and members of radical left factions allied in the broad "Movement Left" (Bewegungslinke), committed to social movements, environmentalism, and intersectional progressivism. The Movement Left broadly dominates the party, with no members of the Wagenknecht faction elected to the executive at the 2022 congress.

| Faction | Description |
|---|---|
| Anti-Capitalist Left; Antikapitalische Linke (AKL) | A current founded in 2006 which seeks to strengthen the party's anti-capitalist profile. The AKL describe themselves as "movement-oriented" and seek cooperation with extra-parliamentary parties and left-wing movements. They are aligned with the orthodox left-wing of Die Linke, and believe that the party should only participate in coalition governments if a set of minimum criteria are met, including no privatization, no military operations, and no cuts to social welfare or the public service. The BfV classifies the AKL as an extremist association. In 2020, the AKL had 1,060 members. Prominent members include Tobias Pflüger, Cornelia Hirsch, Ulla Jelpke, Lucy Redler, and Niema Movassat. |
| Communist Platform; Kommunistische Plattform (KPF) | Originally formed as a tendency of the PDS. It is less critical of German Democratic Republic than other currents and upholds orthodox Marxist positions. A "strategic goal" of the KPF is "building a new socialist society, using the positive experiences of real socialism and to learn from mistakes". Its primary leader was Sahra Wagenknecht, former co-leader of the party's Bundestag faction. The BfV classifies the KPF as an extremist association. In 2020, the group had 1,122 members. |
| Democratic Socialist Forum; Forum demokratischer Sozialismus (fds) | A democratic socialist group considered part of the reformist wing of the party. Originally founded in 2002 as the Forum Second Renewal, it was reformed in 2007 to promote the positions of the PDS within the new Left party. It places emphasis on civil rights and social progressivism, and supports cooperation with the SPD and Greens. Prominent members include Dietmar Bartsch and Luise Neuhaus-Wartenberg. |
| Ecological Platform; Ökologische Plattform (ÖPF) | A current which promotes green politics and eco-socialism. Founded in 1994 within the PDS, it is critical of capitalism and supports degrowth. The group describes itself as "a forum for all left-wing ecologists", and is expressly open to non-Left party members. |
| Emancipatory Left; Emanzipatorische Linke (Ema.Li) | A libertarian socialist current co-founded in May 2009 by Katja Kipping, Caren Lay, and Julia Bonk. They advocate radical democracy, a decentralized society, and are supportive of social movements. Ema.Li is described as holding a "middle position" between the reformist and orthodox wings of the party. The group accepts members of other factions as well as non-party members. Besides its co-founders, prominent members include Christoph Spehr and Anne Helm. |
| Gera Dialogue/Socialist Dialogue; Geraer Dialog/Sozialistischer Dialog (GD/SD) | Formed in February 2003 as a reaction to the increasing influence of reform-oriented groups such as the Reform Left Network. They opposed a shift away from Marxism and what they feared as a move toward a social market economy model. As of 2021, the faction is only partly recognised within the party. The BfV classified GD/SD as an extremist organisation in 2018, but did not include the group in its 2020 report. |
| Marxist Forum; Marxistisches Forum (MF) | Founded in 1995 within the PDS to promote classical Marxism. It is critical of the reform-oriented wings and positions of the party and is often sympathetic to the GDR. As of 2021, the faction is only partly recognised within the party. The BfV classified the group as "orthodox communist" and extremist in its 2018 report, and reported that it had 400 members. The Marxist Forum did not appear in the BfV's 2020 report. |
| Reform Left Network; Netzwerk Reformlinke | Originally formed in 2003 as a tendency within PDS promoting social democracy. It is closely associated with the Democratic Socialist Forum, which was formed around the same time. The Reform Left Network strongly supports involvement in coalition governments with the SPD and Greens. It includes a number of prominent Left politicians, including Bundestag Vice-President Petra Pau, and Saxony-Anhalt branch leader Wulf Gallert, as well as Jan Korte, Stefan Liebich, and Halina Wawzyniak. As of 2021, the faction is no longer recognised within the party. |
| Socialist Left; Sozialistische Linke (SL) | Includes Keynesian leftists and reform communists, and seeks to orient the party toward the labour movement. It is considered part of the left wing of the party. Many leaders of the Socialist Left were formerly members of WASG, and the group models itself on the Dutch Socialist Party and the Italian Communist Refoundation Party. The revolutionary socialist current Marx21 organises within SL, as it does not meet the requirements to become its own caucus. The BfV classifies the current as an extremist association. In 2020, the group had 1,000 members. Leading members include Janine Wissler, Thomas Händel, Jürgen Klute, and Christine Buchholz. |

In addition to the recognised platforms, a number of smaller groups have aligned with Die Linke and its predecessors, such as the Trotskyist Socialist Alternative (SAV), though the membership applications of some of its leaders, including Lucy Redler, were initially rejected. Der Funke (now Revolutionäre Kommunistische Partei), section of the Revolutionary Communist International (RCI) in Germany, pursued entryist strategies in the party, while the Fourth International-affiliated International Socialist Organisation (ISO) also works inside Die Linke. Other left-wing groups, such as the German Communist Party (DKP), have formed local alliances with the party, but have not joined. The Association for Solidarity Perspectives (VsP) also supports the party.

== Membership and electorate ==
According to regular studies by the Free University of Berlin, in 2021 Die Linke's membership comprised 17% blue-collar workers and 32% white-collar workers, similar to the SPD, while 35% were civil servants and 10% self-employed. 51% of party members held an academic degree, and 33% were organized in trade unions. Prior to the merger with WASG, the voting base of PDS was an approximate cross-section of the population, favoured somewhat by more educated voters. Since the merger, Die Linke has become more favoured among working-class and poorer voters, which made up the core of WASG's support.

Since the mid-2010s, the party has gained significant popularity among youth. Prior to the merger, PDS had by far the highest proportion of members over 60 years of any party, at 68%, and the lowest proportion of members under 30, at just 4%. By 2021, these numbers had fallen and risen, respectively, to 40% and 23%. Two-thirds of members who joined the party between 2016 and 2018 were under 35 years of age. In the 2021 federal election, Die Linke was twice as popular among voters under 25 than among voters over 70; at the 2025 federal election, they were the most popular party among this group, winning 25% of the vote.

The PDS inherited 170,000 members from the SED in 1990, but suffered constant decline from that point until the merger with WASG. Upon its formation, Die Linke had 71,000 members, of which 11,500 had been WASG members. Over the next two years the party grew, reaching a peak of 78,000 in 2009, after which point numbers began to decline. In 2016, the party had 59,000 members. This trend temporarily reversed following the 2017 federal election, and the party gained several thousand new members for a total of 62,300 in 2019; however, membership shrank again to 60,350 in December 2020.

By the end of 2023, membership had fallen to 50,000. The secession of the Wagenknecht wing led to further losses. However, it also triggered an influx of new members: Tagesschau reported in July 2024 that 7,500 new entries had outweighed the losses and brought the total to 52,000. They also noted a generational turnover in the composition of the party: a quarter of its membership had joined in the previous two years, and this cohort disproportionately comprised young people, students, and those in large cities. By the national party conference on 18 January 2025, the party counted 60,060 members. They made further rapid gains during the subsequent election campaign: following the CDU's acceptance of AfD support for its immigration bills, Die Linke reported a total of 71,277 members on 3 February, the highest number since 2010. By 11 February they had surpassed their all-time peak with 81,200 members. Shortly after the election, the Frankfurter Rundschau reported that the party had broken 100,000 members.

By the middle of the year, Die Linke had grown to 115,000 members. 60% of new entries were under 35 and were largely female, bringing the proportion of women among the membership up from 40% to 44.5%.

=== Geography ===
Results for the second votes by constituency in the 2017 federal election

A large part of Die Linke's base and membership reside in the new states (the former GDR). The voting base of the PDS was limited almost entirely to the east; upon its formation, the vast majority of Die Linke's western membership came from WASG. However, the party has grown in the west in the years since: while in 2005, the Left.PDS list won just 45.5% of its votes in the western states, this grew to 57.7% in 2009, and 65.4% in 2017. In 2025, they won 74.3% of votes in the west. (The west comprises around 85% of the German population and this percentage has been increasing steadily since 1989.) Between 2016 and 2018, 72% of new party members were from the western states, 15% from the east, and 13% from Berlin. During this period, the party's membership total in the west exceeded that of the east for the first time. As of 2021, 50% of Die Linke's members are from the west, 37% from the east, and 13% from Berlin. Amid the membership surge in 2025, western branches benefited most, with the Bavarian and Schleswig-Holstein associations more than doubling their membership, while eastern branches grew by one-third.

Despite this, on the state level, the party has been marginalised in the west since making several breakthroughs in 2007–2010. Since 2010, it has lost representation in the Landtags of Lower Saxony, North Rhine-Westphalia, and Schleswig-Holstein. Generally growing popularity in the west has also been offset by major losses in most of its eastern heartland since 2014.

Die Linke's voter demographics are skewed strongly by region. In the east, Left voters and members trend much older: in 2018, 44% of the party's members in Mecklenburg-Vorpommern were 76 years or older. Meanwhile, in the west, the party membership is male-dominated, with two-thirds of western members being men.

=== Women ===
Women have been well-represented amongst elected representatives from Die Linke. The party's gender quota requires that at least half of the party's ruling bodies and representatives should be female. In 2021, the party elected two women, Janine Wissler and Susanne Hennig-Wellsow, as federal co-chairs for the first time. Female membership in the PDS was stable at around 45% during the 1990s and 2000s, far higher than any other party, but fell to 39% post-merger in 2007 since the large majority of WASG members were male. Nonetheless, the party had the highest representation of women in its membership until it was overtaken by the Greens in 2012. In 2021, 37% of Left members were female, compared to 42% for the Greens and 33% for the SPD. By June 2025, a surge in female membership saw the proportion of women rise to 44.5%, the highest of any party.

After the 2009 election, the party's Bundestag group was 52.6% female, second only to the Greens (57.4%). In 2013, this increased slightly to 54.7%, which was the highest of any group. After both the 2017 and 2021 federal elections, Die Linke's group was 54% female, second to the Greens (58%). After the 2025 election, 36 of the party's 64 representatives were female (56%).

== Controversies ==
=== Observation by Constitutional Protection ===
The Federal Office for the Protection of the Constitution (Bundesamt für Verfassungsschutz, abbreviated as BfV or Verfassungsschutz) is the German federal domestic security agency, tasked with intelligence-gathering on threats concerning the democratic order, the existence and security of the federation or one of its states. This includes monitoring and reporting on suspected extremist groups and political parties. As of 2013, the Verfassungsschutz did not regard the party as extremist or a threat to democracy, but party members and groups within the party have been periodically monitored, sometimes leading to controversy. According to the 2018 report, radical factions are the Communist Platform, Socialist Left, working group AG Cuba Sí, the Anti-capitalist Left, Marxist Forum, and Gera Dialogue/Socialist Dialogue. The Verfassungsschutz also monitors Socialist Alternative and Marx21, which have links with the Anti-Capitalist Left and the Socialist Left, respectively.

The 2007 Verfassungsschutz report commented that in practice the parliamentary party appears as to act as a "reform-oriented" left force. In the past, Die Linke was under observation by all western German states. In January 2008, Saarland became the first to cease observation. As of 2008, the authorities of Baden-Württemberg, Bavaria, Hesse, and Lower Saxony considered Die Linke in its entirety to be extremist. In the five eastern states, Die Linke is not under surveillance, as state constitutional authorities see no indication of anti-constitutional tendencies in the bulk of the party; however, the Communist Platform is under observation in three eastern states.

Surveillance of party members has been a point of controversy. Bodo Ramelow, a prominent Left politician in Thuringia, was under surveillance until a court ruling in January 2008 that this was illegal. In January 2012, Der Spiegel reported that 27 of the party's 76 Bundestag members were under surveillance, as well as 11 of the party's members of various state parliaments. This included nearly the entirety of the party's Bundestag leadership, federal co-leader Gesine Lötzsch, deputy leader Halina Wawzyniak, and Vice President of the Bundestag Petra Pau. Many of those under surveillance were not associated with acknowledged extremist factions of the party. This surveillance was criticised by the SPD, Greens, and FDP; federal Justice Minister Sabine Leutheusser-Schnarrenberger described it as "intolerable". In October 2013, the Federal Constitutional Court deemed the surveillance of Bundestag members unconstitutional except in extraordinary circumstances, such as if the member was abusing their office to undermine the constitutional order, or otherwise actively fighting against it. Federal Minister of the Interior Thomas de Maizière subsequently announced that none of Die Linke's Bundestag members would be surveilled, even those affiliated with the factions considered extremist by the Verfassungsschutz.

=== Extremism and populism ===
Both media and political scientists have discussed whether Die Linke should be considered extremist in nature. Journalists from outlets including the BBC, The Guardian, Euronews, and Der Spiegel have described the party as far-left, while other journalists writing for the same publications (except Der Spiegel) have referred to the party as left-wing. Among academics, there is a general consensus that at least some sections of the party are extremist; however, political scientist Richard Stöss states that they make up less than 10% of the party membership – 5,000 of 62,000 members according to the BfV – and compete for resources among themselves, and there is little risk of these groups becoming dominant and exerting major influence over the party's leadership and platform. Eckhard Jesse states that, while Die Linke is far more accepting of the Basic Law than parties like the National Democratic Party of Germany, the presence of its extremist factions means the party overall represents a "soft left-wing extremism". Political scientist Karl-Rudolf Korte states that the party is well-integrated within the constitutional order, and "has actually rendered considerable services to German democracy" through the integration of East German protest movement into the parliamentary system. Nonetheless, he criticises the party's continued association with extremist groups.

Die Linke has also been characterised as left-wing populist by researchers such as Cas Mudde and Tilman Mayer. Florian Hartleb states that the party is "social-populist". According to Frank Decker, the party during the leadership of Oskar Lafontaine could be described as left-wing populist. In 2011, Bundestag deputy and later party co-leader Katja Kipping stated that she believed Die Linke needed "a double strategy [of] social-ecological restructuring plus left-wing populism" to become attractive to voters. She elaborated: "Left-wing populism means targeting those who are marginalized in our society in a targeted and pointed manner."

=== Association with the SED ===
Die Linke's position as the successor of the PDS and SED has made it subject to significant controversy and criticism, as well as claims that the party is sympathetic to the former GDR. Former member Sahra Wagenknecht, who served as co-leader of the party's Bundestag group from 2015 to 2019, is well known for her controversial statements on this issue. In a 2009 interview, she rejected the characterisation of East Germany as a dictatorship or unconstitutional state (German: Unrechtsstaat).

Other incidents include a walkout conducted in 2007 by Die Linke's delegation in the Landtag of Saxony during a German Unity Day ceremony in protest of the presence of Joachim Gauck, former East German pro-democracy campaigner and later Federal Commissioner for the Stasi Records, who was the keynote speaker at the event. Die Linke's state leader André Hahn claimed that Gauck did not deliver an "appropriate or balanced speech", arguing he had "an absolutely one-sided view of the GDR".

== Election results ==
=== Federal parliament (Bundestag) ===
| Election | Constituency | | Party list | | Seats | +/– | Status |
| Election | Votes | % | Votes | % | Seats | +/– | Status |
|---|---|---|---|---|---|---|---|
| 2009 | 4,791,124 | 11.1 (#3) | 5,155,933 | 11.9 (#4) | 76 / 622 | ▲22 | Opposition |
| 2013 | 3,585,178 | 8.2 (#3) | 3,755,699 | 8.6 (#3) | 64 / 631 | ▼12 | Opposition |
| 2017 | 3,966,035 | 8.6 (#4) | 4,296,762 | 9.2 (#5) | 69 / 709 | ▲5 | Opposition |
| 2021 | 2,306,755 | 5.0 (#7) | 2,269,993 | 4.9 (#7) | 39 / 735 | ▼30 | Opposition |
| 2025 | 3,932,584 | 7.9 (#5) | 4,355,382 | 8.8 (#5) | 64 / 630 | ▲25 | Opposition |

=== European Parliament ===
| Election | List leader | Votes | % | Seats | +/– | EP Group |
|---|---|---|---|---|---|---|
| 2009 | Lothar Bisky | 1,968,325 | 7.48 (#5) | 8 / 99 | New | The Left - GUE/NGL |
| 2014 | Gabi Zimmer | 2,167,641 | 7.39 (#4) | 7 / 96 | ▼1 | The Left - GUE/NGL |
| 2019 | Martin Schirdewan | 2,056,010 | 5.50 (#5) | 5 / 96 | ▼2 | The Left - GUE/NGL |
| 2024 | Martin Schirdewan | 1,091,268 | 2.74 (#8) | 3 / 96 | ▼2 | The Left - GUE/NGL |

=== State parliaments (Länder) ===
| State parliament | Election | Votes | % | Seats | +/– | Status |
|---|---|---|---|---|---|---|
| Baden-Württemberg | 2026 | 237,062 | 4.4 (#5) | 0 / 157 | 0 | No seats |
| Bavaria | 2023 | 200,795 | 1.5 (#8) | 0 / 203 | 0 | No seats |
| Berlin | 2026 | 468,060 | 25.7 (#1) | 47 / 158 | ▲25 | TBD |
| Brandenburg | 2024 | 44,692 | 3.0 (#6) | 0 / 88 | ▼10 | No seats |
| Bremen | 2023 | 137,676 | 10.9 (#4) | 10 / 87 | 0 | SPD–Greens–Left |
| Hamburg | 2025 | 487,729 | 11.2 (#4) | 15 / 123 | ▲2 | Opposition |
| Hesse | 2023 | 86,821 | 3.1 (#7) | 0 / 133 | ▼9 | No seats |
| Lower Saxony | 2022 | 98,585 | 2.7 (#6) | 0 / 146 | 0 | No seats |
| Mecklenburg-Vorpommern | 2026 | 66,388 | 6.5 (#3) | 5 / 71 | ▼4 | TBD |
| North Rhine-Westphalia | 2022 | 146,634 | 2.1 (#6) | 0 / 195 | 0 | No seats |
| Rhineland-Palatinate | 2026 | 88,967 | 4.4 (#5) | 0 / 105 | 0 | No seats |
| Saarland | 2022 | 11,689 | 2.6 (#6) | 0 / 51 | ▼7 | No seats |
| Saxony | 2024 | 104,888 | 4.5 (#6) | 6 / 119 | ▼8 | Opposition |
| Saxony-Anhalt | 2026 | 112,541 | 8.56 (#3) | 8 / 83 | ▼4 | TBD |
| Schleswig-Holstein | 2022 | 23,035 | 1.7 (#7) | 0 / 69 | 0 | No seats |
| Thuringia | 2024 | 157,641 | 13.1 (#4) | 12 / 88 | ▼17 | Opposition |

Best historic results for state parties
| State | Seats / Total | % | Position/Gov. | Year | Lead candidate |
|---|---|---|---|---|---|
| Baden-Württemberg | 0 / 157 | 4.4 (#5) | No seats | 2026 | Kim Sophie Bohnen |
| Bavaria | 0 / 187 | 4.4 (#6) | No seats | 2008 | Fritz Schmalzbauer |
| Berlin | 47 / 158 | 25.7 (#1) | TBD | 2026 | Elif Eralp |
| Brandenburg | 26 / 88 | 27.2 (#2) | SPD–Left | 2009 | Kerstin Kaiser |
| Bremen | 10 / 84 | 11.3 (#4) | SPD–Greens–Left | 2019 | Kristina Vogt |
| Hamburg | 15 / 121 | 11.2 (#4) | Opposition | 2025 | Cansu Özdemir |
| Hesse | 9 / 137 | 6.3 (#6) | Opposition | 2018 | Janine Wissler; Jan Schalauske |
| Lower Saxony | 11 / 152 | 7.1 (#5) | Opposition | 2008 | Kreszentia Flauger |
| Mecklenburg-Vorpommern | 14 / 71 | 18.4 (#3) | Opposition | 2011 | Helmut Holter |
| North Rhine-Westphalia | 11 / 181 | 5.6 (#5) | Opposition | 2010 | Bärbel Beuermann |
| Rhineland-Palatinate | 0 / 101 | 4.4 (#5) | No seats | 2026 | Rebecca Ruppert |
| Saarland | 11 / 51 | 21.3 (#3) | Opposition | 2009 | Oskar Lafontaine |
| Saxony | 29 / 132 | 20.6 (#2) | Opposition | 2009 | André Hahn |
| Saxony-Anhalt | 29 / 105 | 23.7 (#2) | Opposition | 2011 | Wulf Gallert |
| Schleswig-Holstein | 6 / 95 | 6.0 (#5) | Opposition | 2009 | Antje Jansen |
| Thuringia | 29 / 90 | 31.0 (#1) | Left–SPD–Greens minority | 2019 | Bodo Ramelow (Minister-President 2014–2020, 2020–2024) |

==== State results timeline ====
State parliaments

**Baden-Württemberg**

| Election | Votes | % | Seats | +/− |
|---|---|---|---|---|
| **2011** | 139,700 | 2.8 | 0 / 138 | 0 |
| **2016** | 156,211 | 2.9 | 0 / 138 | 0 |
| **2021** | 173,317 | 3.6 | 0 / 138 | 0 |
| **2026** | 237,062 | 4.4 | 0 / 157 | 0 |

**Bavaria**

| Election | Votes | % | Seats | +/− |
|---|---|---|---|---|
| **2008** | 461,755 | 4.4 | 0 / 187 | 0 |
| **2013** | 251,097 | 2.1 | 0 / 180 | 0 |
| **2018** | 435,949 | 3.2 | 0 / 205 | 0 |
| **2023** | 200,878 | 1.5 | 0 / 203 | 0 |

**Berlin**

| Election | Votes | % | Seats | +/− |
|---|---|---|---|---|
| 2006 | 225,689 | 16.3 | 23 / 141 | ▼10 |
| 2011 | 170,829 | 11.6 | 20 / 152 | ▼3 |
| 2016 | 255,740 | 15.6 | 27 / 160 | ▲7 |
| 2021 | 255,231 | 14.0 | 24 / 160 | ▼3 |
| 2023 | 185,119 | 12.2 | 22 / 160 | ▼2 |
| 2026 | 486,060 | 25.7 | 47 / 158 | ▲25 |

**Brandenburg**

| Election | Votes | % | Seats | +/− |
|---|---|---|---|---|
| **2009** | 377,084 | 27.2 | 26 / 88 | ▼3 |
| **2014** | 183,172 | 18.6 | 17 / 88 | ▼9 |
| **2019** | 135,572 | 10.7 | 10 / 88 | ▼7 |
| **2024** | 44,692 | 3.0 | 0 / 88 | ▼10 |

**Bremen**

| Election | Votes | % | Seats | +/− |
|---|---|---|---|---|
| **2007** | 23,282 | 8.4 | 7 / 83 | ▲7 |
| **2011** | 73,769 | 5.6 | 5 / 83 | ▼2 |
| **2015** | 115,385 | 9.5 | 8 / 83 | ▲3 |
| **2019** | 166,378 | 11.3 | 10 / 84 | ▲2 |
| **2023** | 137,676 | 10.9 | 10 / 84 | 0 |

**Hamburg**

| Election | Votes | % | Seats | +/− |
|---|---|---|---|---|
| **2008** | 50,173 | 6.4 | 8 / 121 | ▲8 |
| **2011** | 220,428* | 6.4 | 8 / 121 | 0 |
| **2015** | 300,567* | 8.5 | 11 / 121 | ▲3 |
| **2020** | 364,102* | 9.1 | 13 / 121 | ▲2 |
| **2025** | 487,729* | 11.2 | 15 / 121 | ▲2 |
*) five votes per voter

**Hesse**

| Election | Votes | % | Seats | +/− |
|---|---|---|---|---|
| **2008** | 140,769 | 5.1 | 6 / 110 | ▲6 |
| **2009** | 139,074 | 5.4 | 6 / 118 | 0 |
| **2013** | 161,488 | 5.2 | 6 / 110 | 0 |
| **2018** | 181,263 | 6.3 | 9 / 137 | ▲3 |
| **2023** | 86,842 | 3.1 | 0 / 133 | ▼9 |

**Mecklenburg-Vorpommern**

| Election | Votes | % | Seats | +/− |
|---|---|---|---|---|
| **2006** | 141,534 | 17.3 | 13 / 71 | 0 |
| **2011** | 125,528 | 18.4 | 14 / 71 | ▲1 |
| **2016** | 106,259 | 13.2 | 11 / 71 | ▼3 |
| **2021** | 90,865 | 9.9 | 9 / 79 | ▼2 |
| **2026** | 66,388 | 6.5 | 5 / 71 | ▼4 |

**Lower Saxony**

| Election | Votes | % | Seats | +/− |
|---|---|---|---|---|
| **2008** | 243,361 | 7.1 | 11 / 152 | ▲11 |
| **2013** | 110,525 | 3.1 | 0 / 137 | ▼11 |
| **2017** | 177,118 | 4.6 | 0 / 137 | 0 |
| **2022** | 98,585 | 2.7 | 0 / 146 | 0 |

**North Rhine-Westphalia**

| Election | Votes | % | Seats | +/− |
|---|---|---|---|---|
| **2005** | 254,977 | 3.1 | 0 / 187 | 0 |
| **2010** | 435,627 | 5.6 | 11 / 181 | ▲11 |
| **2012** | 194,428 | 2.5 | 0 / 237 | ▼11 |
| **2017** | 415,936 | 4.9 | 0 / 199 | 0 |
| **2022** | 146,634 | 2.1 | 0 / 195 | 0 |

**Rhineland-Palatinate**

| Election | Votes | % | Seats | +/− |
|---|---|---|---|---|
| **2006** | 44,826 | 2.6 | 0 / 101 | 0 |
| **2011** | 56,054 | 3.0 | 0 / 101 | 0 |
| **2016** | 60,074 | 2.8 | 0 / 138 | 0 |
| **2021** | 48,210 | 2.5 | 0 / 138 | 0 |
| **2026** | 88,967 | 4.4 | 0 / 105 | 0 |

**Saarland**

| Election | Votes | % | Seats | +/− |
|---|---|---|---|---|
| **2009** | 113,660 | 21.5 | 11 / 51 | ▲11 |
| **2012** | 77,612 | 16.1 | 9 / 51 | ▼2 |
| **2017** | 68,566 | 12.9 | 7 / 51 | ▼2 |
| **2022** | 11,689 | 2.6 | 0 / 51 | ▼7 |

**Saxony**

| Election | Votes | % | Seats | +/− |
|---|---|---|---|---|
| **2009** | 370,359 | 20.6 | 29 / 132 | ▼2 |
| **2014** | 309,568 | 18.9 | 27 / 126 | ▼2 |
| **2019** | 224,411 | 10.4 | 14 / 119 | ▼13 |
| **2024** | 104,891 | 4.5 | 6 / 120 | ▼8 |

**Saxony-Anhalt**

| Election | Votes | % | Seats | +/− |
|---|---|---|---|---|
| **2006** | 217,295 | 24.1 | 26 / 97 | ▲1 |
| **2011** | 235,011 | 23.7 | 29 / 105 | ▲3 |
| **2016** | 183,296 | 16.3 | 16 / 87 | ▼13 |
| **2021** | 116,927 | 11.0 | 12 / 97 | ▼4 |
| **2026** | 112,541 | 8.6 | 8 / 83 | ▼4 |

**Schleswig-Holstein**

| Election | Votes | % | Seats | +/− |
|---|---|---|---|---|
| **2009** | 95,764 | 6.0 | 6 / 95 | ▲6 |
| **2012** | 29,900 | 2.2 | 0 / 69 | ▼6 |
| **2017** | 56,018 | 3.8 | 0 / 73 | 0 |
| **2022** | 23,054 | 1.7 | 0 / 69 | 0 |

**Thuringia**

| Election | Votes | % | Seats | +/− |
|---|---|---|---|---|
| **2009** | 288,932 | 27.4 | 27 / 88 | ▼1 |
| **2014** | 265,425 | 28.2 | 28 / 91 | ▲1 |
| **2019** | 343,738 | 31.0 | 29 / 90 | ▲1 |
| **2024** | 157,641 | 13.1 | 12 / 88 | ▼17 |

=== Results timeline ===
| Party | Year | (Germany) DE | (European Union) EU | (Baden-Württemberg) BW | (Bavaria) BY | (Berlin) BE | (Brandenburg) BB | (Bremen (state)) HB | (Hamburg) HH | (Hesse) HE | (Lower Saxony) NI | (Mecklenburg-Vorpommern) MV | (North Rhine-Westphalia) NW | (Rhineland-Palatinate) RP | (Saarland) SL | (Saxony) SN | (Saxony-Anhalt) ST | (Schleswig-Holstein) SH | (Thuringia) TH |
| PDS | 2004 | For continuation before 2005, see the PDS's timeline | | | | | | | | | | | | | | | | | |
|---|---|---|---|---|---|---|---|---|---|---|---|---|---|---|---|---|---|---|---|
| The Left.PDS & WASG | 2005 | ▲8.7 | N/A | N/A | | N/A | N/A | N/A | | | N/A | N/A | ▲3.1 | N/A | N/A | N/A | N/A | ▼0.5 | N/A |
| The Left.PDS & WASG | 2006 | ▲8.7 | N/A | 3.1 | | ▼13.4 | N/A | N/A | | | N/A | ▲16.8 | ▲3.1 | ▲2.7 | N/A | N/A | ▲**24.1** | ▼0.5 | N/A |
| The Left | 2007 | ▲8.7 | N/A | 3.1 | | | N/A | ▲8.4 | | | N/A | ▲16.8 | ▲3.1 | ▲2.7 | N/A | N/A | ▲**24.1** | ▼0.5 | N/A |
| The Left | 2008 | ▲8.7 | N/A | 3.1 | **4.4** | | N/A | ▲8.4 | 6.4 | 5.1 | ▲**7.1** | ▲16.8 | ▲3.1 | ▲2.7 | N/A | N/A | ▲**24.1** | ▼0.5 | N/A |
| The Left | 2009 | ▲**11.9** | ▲**7.5** | 3.1 | **4.4** | | ▼**27.2** | ▲8.4 | 6.4 | ▲5.4 | ▲**7.1** | ▲16.8 | ▲3.1 | ▲2.7 | ▲**21.3** | ▼**20.6** | ▲**24.1** | ▲**6.0** | ▲27.4 |
| The Left | 2010 | ▲**11.9** | ▲**7.5** | 3.1 | **4.4** | | | ▲8.4 | 6.4 | ▲5.4 | ▲**7.1** | ▲16.8 | ▲**5.6** | ▲2.7 | ▲**21.3** | ▼**20.6** | ▲**24.1** | ▲**6.0** | ▲27.4 |
| The Left | 2011 | ▲**11.9** | ▲**7.5** | ▼2.8 | **4.4** | ▼11.6 | | ▼5.6 | 6.4 | ▲5.4 | ▲**7.1** | ▲**18.4** | ▲**5.6** | ▲3.0 | ▲**21.3** | ▼**20.6** | ▼23.7 | ▲**6.0** | ▲27.4 |
| The Left | 2012 | ▲**11.9** | ▲**7.5** | ▼2.8 | **4.4** | ▼11.6 | | ▼5.6 | 6.4 | ▲5.4 | ▲**7.1** | ▲**18.4** | ▼2.5 | ▲3.0 | ▼16.1 | ▼**20.6** | ▼23.7 | ▼2.3 | ▲27.4 |
| The Left | 2013 | ▼8.6 | ▲**7.5** | ▼2.8 | ▼2.1 | ▼11.6 | | ▼5.6 | 6.4 | ▼5.2 | ▼3.1 | ▲**18.4** | ▼2.5 | ▲3.0 | ▼16.1 | ▼**20.6** | ▼23.7 | ▼2.3 | ▲27.4 |
| The Left | 2014 | ▼8.6 | ▼7.4 | ▼2.8 | ▼2.1 | ▼11.6 | ▼18.6 | ▼5.6 | 6.4 | ▼5.2 | ▼3.1 | ▲**18.4** | ▼2.5 | ▲3.0 | ▼16.1 | ▼18.9 | ▼23.7 | ▼2.3 | ▲28.2 |
| The Left | 2015 | ▼8.6 | ▼7.4 | ▼2.8 | ▼2.1 | ▼11.6 | | ▲9.5 | ▲8.5 | ▼5.2 | ▼3.1 | ▲**18.4** | ▼2.5 | ▲3.0 | ▼16.1 | ▼18.9 | ▼23.7 | ▼2.3 | |
| The Left | 2016 | ▼8.6 | ▼7.4 | ▲2.9 | ▼2.1 | ▲15.6 | | ▲9.5 | ▲8.5 | ▼5.2 | ▼3.1 | ▼13.2 | ▼2.5 | ▼2.8 | ▼16.1 | ▼18.9 | ▼16.3 | ▼2.3 | |
| The Left | 2017 | ▲9.2 | ▼7.4 | ▲2.9 | ▼2.1 | | | ▲9.5 | ▲8.5 | ▼5.2 | ▲4.6 | ▼13.2 | ▲4.9 | ▼2.8 | ▼12.8 | ▼18.9 | ▼16.3 | ▲3.8 | |
| The Left | 2018 | ▲9.2 | ▼7.4 | ▲2.9 | ▲3.2 | | | ▲9.5 | ▲8.5 | ▲**6.3** | ▲4.6 | ▼13.2 | ▲4.9 | ▼2.8 | ▼12.8 | ▼18.9 | ▼16.3 | ▲3.8 | |
| The Left | 2019 | ▲9.2 | ▼5.5 | ▲2.9 | ▲3.2 | | ▼10.7 | ▲**11.3** | ▲8.5 | ▲**6.3** | ▲4.6 | ▼13.2 | ▲4.9 | ▼2.8 | ▼12.8 | ▼10.4 | ▼16.3 | ▲3.8 | ▲**31.0** |
| The Left | 2020 | ▲9.2 | ▼5.5 | ▲2.9 | ▲3.2 | | ▼10.7 | | ▲9.1 | ▲**6.3** | ▲4.6 | ▼13.2 | ▲4.9 | ▼2.8 | ▼12.8 | ▼10.4 | ▼16.3 | ▲3.8 | |
| The Left | 2021 | ▼4.9 | ▼5.5 | ▲3.6 | ▲3.2 | ▼14.0 | ▼10.7 | | ▲9.1 | ▲**6.3** | ▲4.6 | ▼9.9 | ▲4.9 | ▼2.5 | ▼12.8 | ▼10.4 | ▼11.0 | ▲3.8 | |
| The Left | 2022 | ▼4.9 | ▼5.5 | ▲3.6 | ▲3.2 | ▼14.0 | ▼10.7 | | ▲9.1 | ▲**6.3** | ▼2.7 | | ▼2.1 | ▼2.5 | ▼2.6 | ▼10.4 | ▼11.0 | ▼1.7 | |
| The Left | 2023 | ▼4.9 | ▼5.5 | ▲3.6 | ▼1.5 | ▼12.2 | ▼10.7 | ▲10.9 | ▲9.1 | ▼3.1 | ▼2.7 | | ▼2.1 | ▼2.5 | ▼2.6 | ▼10.4 | ▼11.0 | ▼1.7 | |
| The Left | 2024 | ▼4.9 | ▼2.7 | ▲3.6 | ▼1.5 | ▼12.2 | ▼3.0 | | ▲9.1 | ▼3.1 | ▼2.7 | | ▼2.1 | ▼2.5 | ▼2.6 | ▼4.5 | ▼11.0 | ▼1.7 | ▼13.1 |
| The Left | 2025 | ▲8.8 | ▼2.7 | ▲3.6 | ▼1.5 | ▼12.2 | ▼3.0 | | ▲**11.2** | ▼3.1 | ▼2.7 | | ▼2.1 | ▼2.5 | ▼2.6 | ▼4.5 | ▼11.0 | ▼1.7 | ▼13.1 |
| The Left | 2026 | ▲8.8 | ▼2.7 | ▲**4.4** | ▼1.5 | ▲**25.7** | ▼3.0 | | ▲**11.2** | ▼3.1 | ▼2.7 | ▼6.5 | ▼2.1 | ▲**4.4** | ▼2.6 | ▼4.5 | ▼8.6 | ▼1.7 | ▼13.1 |
| Party | Year | (Germany) DE | (European Union) EU | (Baden-Württemberg) BW | (Bavaria) BY | (Berlin) BE | (Brandenburg) BB | (Bremen (state)) HB | (Hamburg) HH | (Hesse) HE | (Lower Saxony) NI | (Mecklenburg-Vorpommern) MV | (North Rhine-Westphalia) NW | (Rhineland-Palatinate) RP | (Saarland) SL | (Saxony) SN | (Saxony-Anhalt) ST | (Schleswig-Holstein) SH | (Thuringia) TH |
**Bold** indicates best result to date. Present in legislature (in opposition); Junior coalition partner Senior coalition partner

== See also ==
- List of political parties in Germany
- Communist Party of Germany
- Merger of the KPD and SPD

== Literature ==
- Elo, Kimmo (2008). "The Left Party and the Long-Term Developments of the German Party System". German Politics and Society. 26 (88): 50–68. doi:10.3167/gps.2008.260303.
- Heilig, Dominic (April 2016). Mapping the European Left: Socialist Parties in the EU (Report). Rosa Luxemburg Stiftung.
- Hough, Dan; Koß, Michael (2009). "Populism Personified or Reinvigorated Reformers? The German Left Party in 2009 and Beyond". German Politics and Society. 27 (91): 76–91. doi:10.3167/gps.2009.270206.
- Knabe, Hubertus (2009). Honeckers Erben. Die Wahrheit über Die Linke. Berlin: Propyläen. ISBN 978-3-549-07329-2.
- Patton, David F. (2011). Out of the East: From PDS to Left Party in Unified Germany. State University of New York Press.
