= The Left faction (Bundestag) =

Die Linke faction Fraktion Die Linke im Bundestag
- Co-Chairpersons: Heidi Reichinnek; Sören Pellmann
- Registered: 23 September 2005; 25 February 2025
- Dissolved: 6 December 2023
- Preceded by: The Left group
- Succeeded by: The Left group BSW group

Website
- www.dielinkebt.de/start

The Left Party faction (Linksfraktion) is the parliamentary group of the party Die Linke in the Bundestag. It existed from 2005 to 2023, but was dissolved in 2023 following the Bundnis Sahra Wagenknecht split. After the 2025 election, the faction was formed again.

== History ==
The Left parliamentary group was constituted on 23 September 2005. Before the merger of Labour and Social Justice (WASG) and the Party of Democratic Socialism(PDS) to form Die Linke on 16 June 2007, the Left parliamentary group was the joint parliamentary group of independent members of the German Bundestag and members of the two source parties in the German Bundestag. The parliamentary group chairmanship was initially shared by Gregor Gysi and Oskar Lafontaine. After the 2009 German federal election, Gysi was elected the sole chairman due to Lafontaine's withdrawal due to illness. After Gysi decided not to run for parliamentary group chairmanship again, Sahra Wagenknecht and Dietmar Bartsch were elected parliamentary group chairmen in October 2015. In November 2019, Amira Mohamed Ali was elected to succeed Sahra Wagenknecht. From October 2023, Bartsch was the sole parliamentary group chairman.

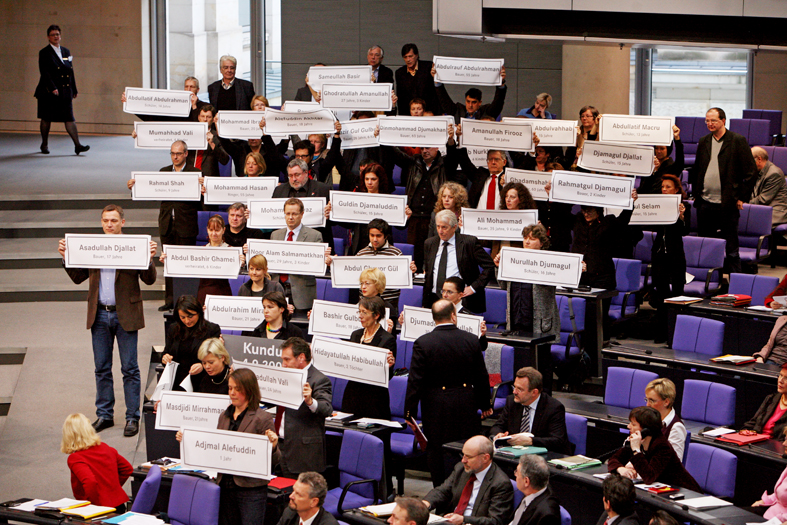
Die Linke faction protesting

On 26 February 2010, 50 members of the Left Party were excluded from the Bundestag debate on the extension of the occupation of Afghanistan by the President of the Bundestag, Norbert Lammert, after they had violated the German Bundestag's rules of procedure by holding up posters with the names and ages of victims of the deadly air strikes in Kunduz in early September 2009 from their seats. The parliamentary group then left the plenary session en masse. However, contrary to the Bundestag's rules of procedure, the parliamentary group was allowed to vote again at Lammert's suggestion, where it voted unanimously against the mission. In October 2013, the daily newspaper Die Welt alleged that the parliamentary group's manager, Ruth Kampa, had worked for the Ministry for State Security for over 20 years as an unofficial employee. Kampa was then hired as a legal advisor instead.

Although Die Linke failed to clear the five percent hurdle in the 2021 German federal election and only entered the Bundestag with 39 MPs thanks to the basic mandate clause, it formed its own fraktion and not a gruppe. The prerequisite for this was not the second vote share, but that a party achieved more than 5% of the seats in parliament therefore the five percent hurdle did not prevent them from winning seats. Die Linke accounted for 5.3% of the mandates, and most recently the parliamentary group had 5.2% of the MPs.

On 14 November 2023, the parliamentary group decided to dissolve itself on 6 December 2023. The reason was the resignation of ten parliamentary group members around Sahra Wagenknecht as part of the founding of the Sahra Wagenknecht alliance. With its remaining 28 MPs, Die Linke could no longer form a parliamentary group in the Bundestag, as this would have required at least 37 MPs (5% of parliamentarians). The Left group was then formed.

On 25 February 2025, two days after the German federal election 2025, the Left faction was reestablished. Heidi Reichinnek and Sören Pellmann became the chairmen of the faction. On 25 March 2025, the 21st Bundestag was constituted, with the Left faction becoming one of the five factions.

== Parliamentary group executive committee ==
The parliamentary group executive committee consists of the following people since 2025:

Name	Position	Area of responsibility
Heidi Reichinnek	Party leader	
Sören Pellmann	Party leader	
Vacant	Chief Whip	
Vacant	Deputy Group Leader	Chair of Working Group I: Work and Social Affairs
Vacant	Deputy Group Leader	Chair of Working Group II: Budget, Finance, Economy, Infrastructure, Environment
Vacant	Deputy Group Leader	Chair of Working Group III: Education, Digitalization, Democracy, Interior
Vacant	Deputy Group Leader	Women's policy spokeswoman
Advisory voices on the board
Bodo Ramelow	Vice-president of the Bundestag	
Ines Schwerdtner	Party leader	
Jan van Aken	Party leader	

== Women's plenum ==
The female MPs formed the women's plenum. It elected the spokesperson for women's policy, who was a member of the parliamentary group executive and had a right of veto on parliamentary group decisions.

== Composition of the 20th German Bundestag ==
The Left Party faction was recently composed of 38 members in the 20th Bundestag, making it the smallest of the six factions in the Bundestag.

The following members were directly elected:

- Gesine Lötzsch in Lichtenberg
- Gregor Gysi in Treptow – Köpenick
- Sören Pellmann in Leipzig II

The parliamentary group appointed "spokespersons" who communicate the parliamentary group's opinion to the outside world on certain topics and who were available to address specific topics. The party provides the chairman of the Committee on Climate Protection and Energy. Former party chairman and trade union official Klaus Ernst was elected chairman on December 15, 2021. Before the election, the nomination had been criticized by climate activists and several Left Party politicians under the slogan Nicht euer Ernst ("Not your seriousness"), a pun on the candidate's surname, and launched an online petition to stop his appointment. Since the Alternative for Germany (AfD) candidate did not receive enough votes in the Committee on Internal Affairs and Homeland in the election of the chairman and the election of a deputy chair was subsequently dispensed with, the committee was temporarily chaired by Petra Pau, the longest-serving member of the committee.

On 10 October 2023, MP Thomas Lutze switched from the Left Party to the SPD.

On 23 October 2023, with the foundation of the Sahra Wagenknecht Alliance, ten of the 38 Left Party members of the Bundestag left the Left Party. However, they remained with the parliamentary group as independents until its dissolution.

== Composition of the 21st German Bundestag ==
The Left Party faction in the 21st Bundestag consists of 64 members, with 46 of them being elected for the first time.

Some well-known members include:

- Ines Schwerdtner, party co-leader and directly elected in Berlin-Lichtenberg
- Jan van Aken, party co-leader and co-top candidate in the 2025 federal election
- Heidi Reichinnek, co-top candidate in the 2025 federal election
- Gregor Gysi, former party leader and directly elected in Berlin-Treptow – Köpenick
- Bodo Ramelow, former minister president of Thuringia and directly elected in Erfurt – Weimar – Weimarer Land II
- Sören Pellmann, directly elected in Leipzig II
- Ferat Koçak, directly elected in Berlin-Neukölln
- Pascal Meiser, directly elected in Berlin-Friedrichshain-Kreuzberg – Prenzlauer Berg Ost
- Dietmar Bartsch, former faction leader between October 2015 and December 2023
- Janine Wissler, former party co-leader between February 2021 and October 2024

Two members were elected as Bundestag committee chairs: Caren Lay was elected as chair for the Committee on Housing, Urban Development, Construction and Municipalities, while Lorenz Gösta Beutin was elected as chair for the Committee on the Environment, Climate Action, Nature Conservation and Nuclear Safety. Christian Görke and Ina Latendorf are members of the Council of Elders.

== Charitable engagement ==
From 2002 onwards, the majority of the parliamentary group's members donated 200 EUR per month to the association of the Bundestag parliamentary group Die Linke e. V. to support political and cultural projects. The association not only supports international projects from medica mondiale (Right Livelihood Award 2008) to the solar energy project in Cuba, but also, for example, the Staßfurter Tafel or a project for people with disabilities in Kyffhäuserkreis.

The Left Party faction published a rent price check app in 2024. As of June 2025, this currently covers the cities of Berlin, Potsdam, Hamburg, Hanover, Munich, Dortmund, Erfurt, Leipzig, and Freiburg im Breisgau.

== Observation by the Federal Office for the Protection of the Constitution ==
At the beginning of 2012, a report by the news magazine Der Spiegel revealed that 27 members of the Bundestag from the Left Party, and thus more than a third of the members of the Left Party, were being monitored separately by the Federal Office for the Protection of the Constitution. Among those being monitored were almost the entire leadership of the Bundestag faction. The extent of the monitoring was controversial and was criticized by politicians from the FDP, SPD, Greens and CDU. In 2013, according to Der Spiegel, 25 of the 57 members of the Bundestag from the Left Party were under surveillance by the Office for the Protection of the Constitution.

In March 2014, the Federal Minister of the Interior, Thomas de Maizière, informed the parliamentary group leader Gregor Gysi that Left Party MPs would no longer be monitored by the Federal Office for the Protection of the Constitution and that members of the Bundestag would "in future generally be exempt from surveillance by the domestic secret service".
