= The Left group (Bundestag) =

- Leader: Heidi Reichinnek; Sören Pellmann
- Registered: 2 February 2024
- Dissolved: 25 February 2025
- Preceded by: The Left faction
- Succeeded by: The Left faction
- National affiliation: Die Linke

Website
- https://dielinkebt.de/

The Left was a parliamentary group in the German Bundestag composed of former members of the Die Linke faction. The group was founded or recognized on 2 February 2024, after the official Left parliamentary group was dissolved in December 2023 due to internal conflicts and subsequent split, with the members that joined the BSW forming its own group. On 25 February 2025, Die Linke announced that in the 21st Bundestag the faction would be recreated.

== Members ==
Between February 2024 and February 2025, the group had 28 members, including Dietmar Bartsch and Gregor Gysi.

== Alignment ==
The group Die Linke represents a left-wing, socialist and anti-militarist policy. It is committed to social justice, peace and environmental policy (see: Die Linke).

== Positions ==
The Left group was in opposition. It criticized the government's policies as antisocial, non-peaceful and harmful to the climate.

The group’s key topics included:

- Social justice: It called for an increase in the minimum wage, the introduction of an unconditional basic security and the strengthening of social security systems.
- Peace: The group rejected foreign missions of the Bundeswehr and advocates a peaceful solution to international conflicts.
- Environmental policy: The Left group called for a consistent energy transition and the phase-out of coal-fired power.
