= BSW group (Bundestag) =

German parliamentary group

BSW Group Gruppe BSW im Bundestag
- Leader: Sahra Wagenknecht
- Founder: Sahra Wagenknecht
- Registered: 2 February 2024
- Split from: The Left faction (Bundestag)

Website
- bsw-bt.de

The BSW group was a parliamentary group in the 20th German Bundestag. BSW stands for Bündnis Sahra Wagenknecht, Sahra Wagenknecht being the party founder and leader. All ten members of the group were previously in the Die Linke fraction, which was dissolved in December 2023. The BSW group was recognized as a group on 2 February 2024.

Following the 2025 German federal election, the BSW would fail to reach 5% and thus lose all seats.

== The BSW group in the 20th German Bundestag ==
The group currently has ten members, including the former parliamentary group leader of the Left Party in the Bundestag Amira Mohamed Ali, the former party leader of the Left Party Klaus Ernst and the former deputy party leader and penultimate parliamentary group leader of the Left Party Sahra Wagenknecht:

Member	Committee work
Klaus Ernst	Committee on Home Affairs
Jessica Tatti	Council of Elders and Committee for Labor and Social Affairs (Deputy Member)
Andrej Hunko	Health Committee, EU Affairs Committee and Foreign Affairs Committee (Substitute Member)
Amira Mohamed Ali	Environment, Nature Conservation, Nuclear Safety and Consumer Protection and Legal Affairs Committee
Alexander Ulrich	Committee on Labor and Social Affairs
Ali Al-Dailami	Committee on Education, Research and Technology Assessment
Christian Leye	Budget Committee
Sevim Dağdelen	Foreign Affairs Committee
Żaklin Nastić	Defence Committee and Committee on Family, Senior Citizens, Women and Youth
Sahra Wagenknecht	

With regard to parliamentary work, the BSW group was responsible for no legislative initiatives, no major interpellations, 32 minor interpellations, ten independent motions and three motions for resolutions in the 20th legislative term (as of July 2024).

== Background ==
=== Founding ===
After a long dispute over direction within the Left Party, Sahra Wagenknecht, together with nine other members of the Bundestag, left the Left Party on October 23, 2023, but remained in the Left faction for the time being. On November 14, 2023, the dissolution of the Left parliamentary group in the Bundestag was decided for December 6, 2023. On December 6, 2023, the parliamentary group was dissolved. On February 2, 2024, the BSW and Left groups were recognized.

=== Absence from the speech of Ukrainian president Volodymyr Zelenskyy ===
The BSW members stayed away from the speech by Ukrainian president Volodymyr Zelenskyy in the German Bundestag in June 2024. In a statement by the BSW group, the reason given was that President is currently helping to "promote a highly dangerous spiral of escalation" and is "accepting the risk of a nuclear conflict with devastating consequences for the whole of Europe." Everything must be done to ensure that the conflict does not escalate "into a major European war" and that Germany does not become a party to the war. Zelenskyy "should not be honoured with a special event in the German Bundestag". Chancellor Olaf Scholz and opposition leader Friedrich Merz sharply criticized the BSW for its absence and viewed it as a lack of respect. Politicians from the Left also criticized the BSW for this.
