= Dietmar Bartsch =

German politician

Dietmar Bartsch MdB
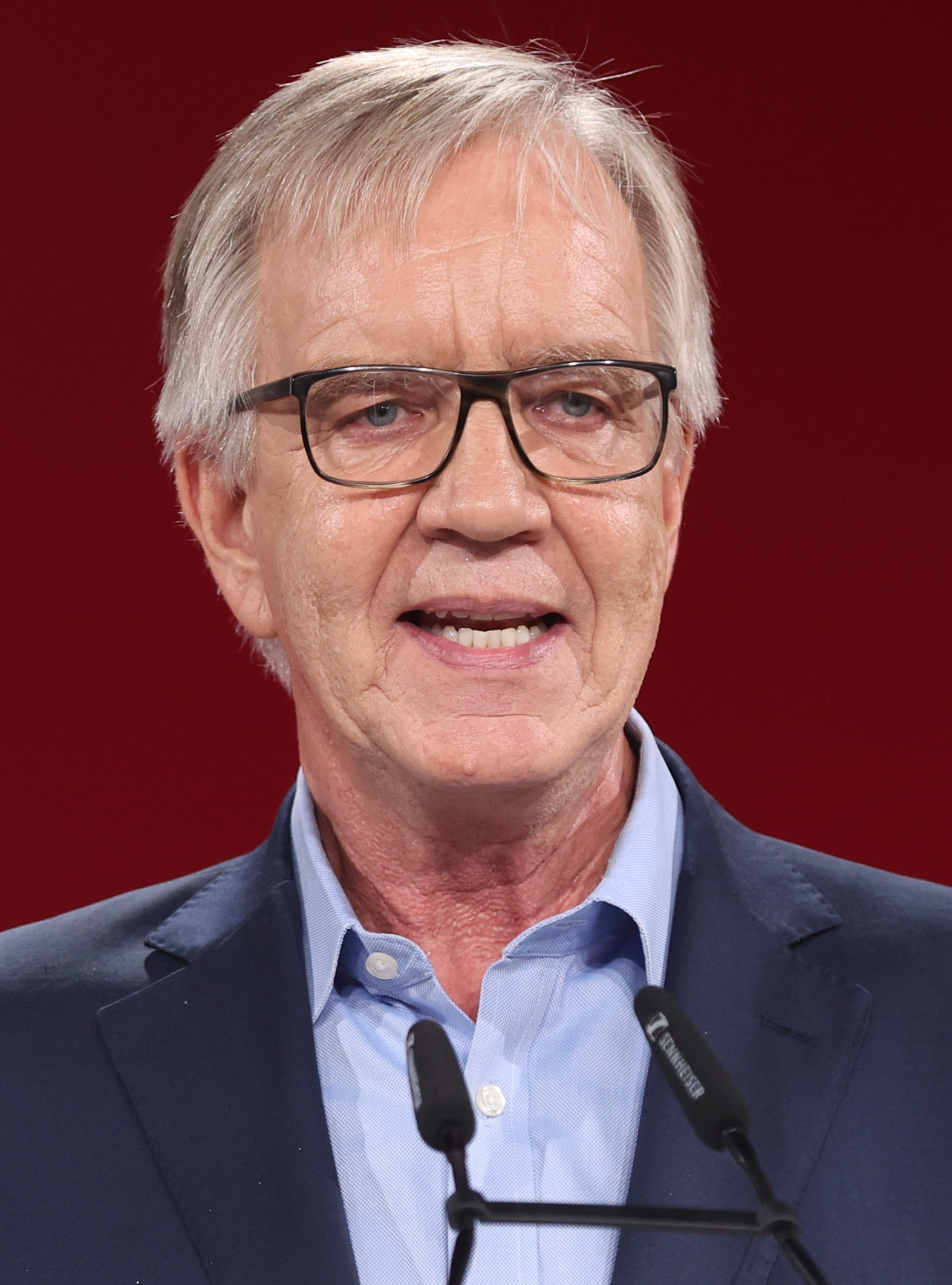
- Bartsch in 2025

Leader of the Opposition
- In office 12 October 2015 – 24 October 2017 Serving with Sahra Wagenknecht
- Preceded by: Gregor Gysi
- Succeeded by: Alice Weidel; Alexander Gauland

Leader of The Left in the Bundestag
- In office 12 October 2015 – 6 December 2023
- Chief Whip: Petra Sitte; Jan Korte
- Deputy: See list: Heike Hänsel; Jan Korte; Sevim Dağdelen; Caren Lay; Susanne Ferschl; Gesine Lötzsch; Nicole Gohlke; Ali Al-Dailami; Heidi Reichinnek
- Preceded by: Gregor Gysi
- Succeeded by: Position abolished
Parliamentary constituencies
Member of the Bundestag for Mecklenburg-Vorpommern
Incumbent
Assumed office 18 October 2005
Preceded by	multi-member district
Constituency	The Left List
In office 26 October 1998 – 17 October 2002
Preceded by	multi-member district
Succeeded by	multi-member district
Constituency	Party of Democratic Socialism List

Personal details
- Born: 31 March 1958 (age 68) Stralsund, East Germany
- Party: The Left (since 2007)
- Other political affiliations: SED (1977–1990); PDS (1990–2007)
- Children: 2
- Education: Hochschule für Ökonomie Berlin; Academy for Social Sciences at the Communist Party of the Soviet Union (Dr. rer. oec.)

Military service
- Allegiance: East Germany
- Branch/service: National People's Army
- Years of service: 1976–1978
- Unit: National People's Army / Fallschirmjägerbataillon 40

Dietmar Gerhard Bartsch (born 31 March 1958) is a German politician who has served as co-chair of The Left parliamentary group in the Bundestag since 2015. Prior, he served as federal treasurer of The Left from 2006 to 2009 and federal managing officer from 2005 to 2010. He was a prominent member of The Left's predecessor party, the PDS, of which he served as treasurer from 1991 to 1997 and federal managing officer from 1997 to 2002.

He has been a member of the Bundestag since 2005, and previously served from 1998 to 2002. In his capacity as Bundestag co-leader, he served with Sahra Wagenknecht from 2015 to 2019, and with Amira Mohamed Ali since 2019. Bartsch has served as federal co-lead candidate for his party on three occasions: 2002, 2017, and 2021.

== Early life and education ==
Bartsch was born and raised in Stralsund, East Germany, today located in the German state of Mecklenburg-Vorpommern. After completing his schooling at the EOS Franzburg in 1976, he studied political economy at the University of Economic Studies at Berlin-Karlshorst, graduating in 1983.

Following graduation, Bartsch joined the business department of the German daily paper Junge Welt. From 1986 until 1990, he studied at the Academy for Social Sciences at the Communist Party of the Soviet Union headquarters in Moscow, before returning to the Junge Welt as their business executive.

== Political career ==
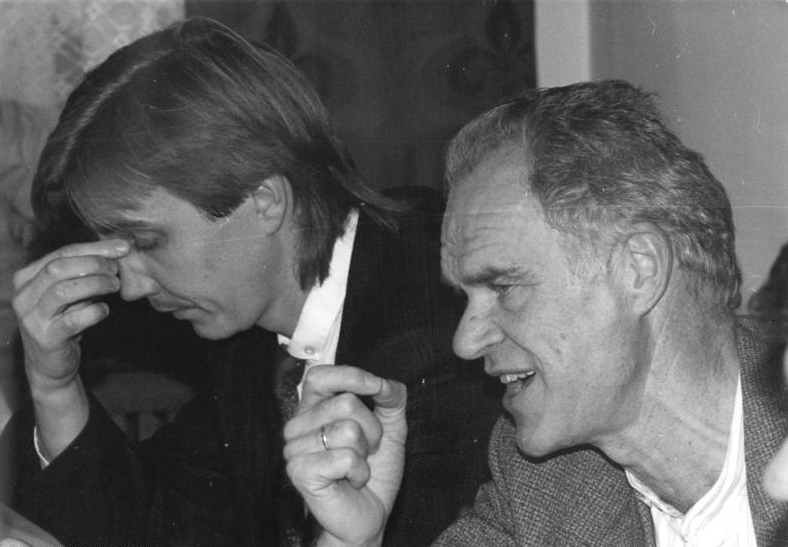
Bartsch (left) with economist Klaus Steinitz at a PDS press conference, 17 December 1990

Bartsch joined the Socialist Unity Party of Germany (SED), the ruling party of East Germany, in 1977. He co-founded the Committee of Young Comrades (AGJG) in 1989. Following German reunification, Bartsch remained a member of the Party of Democratic Socialism (PDS), serving as federal treasurer and later federal managing officer. He was elected to the Bundestag in 1998.

In the 2002 German federal election, Bartsch was one of four lead candidates for the PDS, alongside Gabi Zimmer, Petra Pau, and Roland Claus. The party failed to meet the five percent electoral threshold, and only returned two representatives, both directly elected in constituencies. Bartsch thus lost his seat in the Bundestag. He was subsequently asked to resign as federal managing officer, and declined to seek re-election in October. However, he was nominated for the position again by PDS leader Lothar Bisky in 2005, and elected to the position in December. He returned to the Bundestag in the 2005 election. After the merger of the PDS into The Left in 2007, Bartsch became federal managing officer of the new party.

Bartsch managed The Left's 2009 federal election campaign. The party won 11.9% of votes nationwide and 76 seats in the Bundestag; he was re-elected at the top position of the party list in Mecklenburg-Vorpommern. In January 2010, after disputes within the party, Bartsch announced he would not seek re-election as federal managing officer at the party congress in May. Later in January, he became deputy chairman of the Left's Bundestag group. In this position, he focused on the national budget and finances.

In January 2012, Der Spiegel reported that 27 of the Left's 76 members of the Bundestag were under surveillance by the Federal Office for the Protection of the Constitution, including Bartsch. The surveillance of Bundestag deputies, including many such as Bartsch who were not connected with groups classified as anti-constitutional, was criticised by the FDP, SPD, and Greens. The monitoring of Bundestag deputies without clear cause was ruled unconstitutional by the Federal Constitutional Court in 2013, and surveillance of The Left's deputies was discontinued.

In late 2011, Bartsch declared his intention to run for party chairman at the 2012 party congress, even after incumbent Oskar Lafontaine announced his desire to seek re-election. Lafontaine withdrew before the congress, and Bartsch was defeated by Bernd Riexinger, an ally of Lafontaine from the party's left-wing. Bartsch won 251 votes (45%) to Riexinger's 297 (53%).

Bartsch was elected co-leader of the Left's Bundestag group in 2015 alongside Sahra Wagenknecht, succeeding long-time leader Gregor Gysi. Bartsch won 91.6% of votes cast. As the Left was at the time the largest opposition party in the Bundestag, Bartsch became a prominent leader of the opposition for the remainder of the parliamentary term.

Bartsch and fellow parliamentary leader Wagenknecht were the Left's lead candidates for the 2017 federal election. The party made small gains in the election, though they fell from third to fifth place with 9.2% of votes and 69 seats. Bartsch contested the Rostock – Landkreis Rostock II constituency and placed second behind the victorious CDU candidate, winning 24.8% of votes.

Ahead of the 2021 federal election, Bartsch was once again chosen as one of The Left's two lead candidates alongside new party co-leader Janine Wissler. They were confirmed with 87% of votes by the party executive on 9 May.

After the formation of BSW—For Reason and Justice, it was predicted that the remaining MPs for The Left could split along Bartsch's supporters and the party leadership.

== Political positions ==
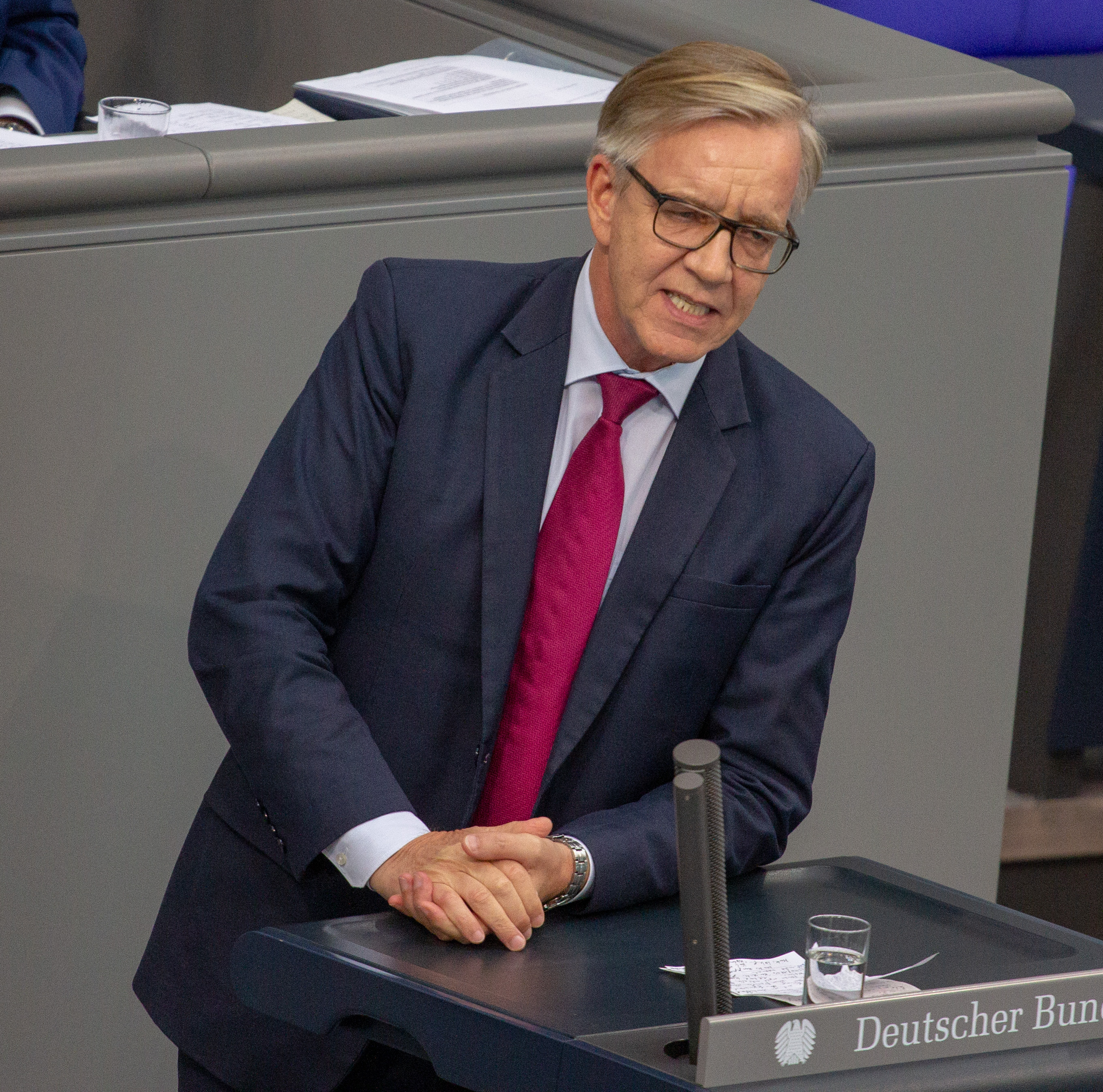
Bartsch in 2019

Bartsch is considered a prominent leader of the moderate, reformist wing of The Left.

During the 2013–17 parliamentary term, Bartsch advocated for a federal coalition between the Left and the SPD. Ahead of the 2017 German presidential election, Bartsch supported the prospect of a joint centre-left candidate supported by the SPD, Left, and Greens. After the SPD rejected this proposal, the Left refused to support SPD candidate Frank-Walter Steinmeier.

In response to a 2011 incident in which several members of The Left refused to participate in a minute of silence for victims of the Berlin Wall, Bartsch suggested that members who refused to condemn the Wall should leave the party. He also distanced himself from a congratulatory birthday letter, signed by party co-leaders Gesine Lötzsch and Klaus Ernst, sent to Fidel Castro by members of the party.

In 2017, Bartsch stated that former Stasi employees should not always be excluded from government office, believing that a critical assessment of each individual is necessary. He also argued against characterising East Germany as an injustice state (Unrechtsstaat), describing the usage of the term as a "cudgel" lacking nuance. He stated: "It is undisputed that there was serious injustice and victims of it in the GDR. It is also indisputable that there were areas of the rule of law in the GDR."

Bartsch accused the German government of delivering a weak response to the 2016 Turkish purges, and demanded that more pressure should be put the Turkish government to respect democracy and human rights.

== Controversy ==
In early January 2010, Bartsch was accused of disloyalty by Left parliamentary leader Gregor Gysi after passing information to Der Spiegel about the retirement of party leader Oskar Lafontaine. Bartsch denied this, as well as allegations that he sought to succeed Lafontaine as chairman, and defended his record as federal managing officer. However, he announced that he would not seek re-election to the position at the party congress in May.

In September 2015, shortly before Bartsch's election as parliamentary co-leader, Die Welt reported on leaked documents showing that, in 2012, he privately commissioned Thomas Westphal to draft a detailed report on the members of The Left's 44-member executive committee. The file indicated the views of each member and their position in the party. Most controversially, each was classified according to allegiance: allies were labeled Z for "reliable", others U for "independent", and rivals L for "left" or "Lafodödel", a derisive term for supporters of Lafontaine. The file was extensively researched and updated over time. Bartsch claimed that Gysi requested the creation of the file after the 2012 party congress to gauge support for Lafontaine among the new party executive, though Gysi denied this. Bartsch stated that the document represented the "relatively normal process" of categorising regional association and factions, not party opponents, and that he only used the term "Lafodödel" in a single email. He also claimed it was already public knowledge within the party in 2012, and the issue was discussed with the people involved at the time. Upon the publication of the Die Welt article, prominent members Jan van Aken, Martina Renner, and Klaus Ernst expressed outrage at the existence of Bartsch's document.

== Personal life ==
Bartsch is married and has two children.
