= Sören Pellmann =

German politician

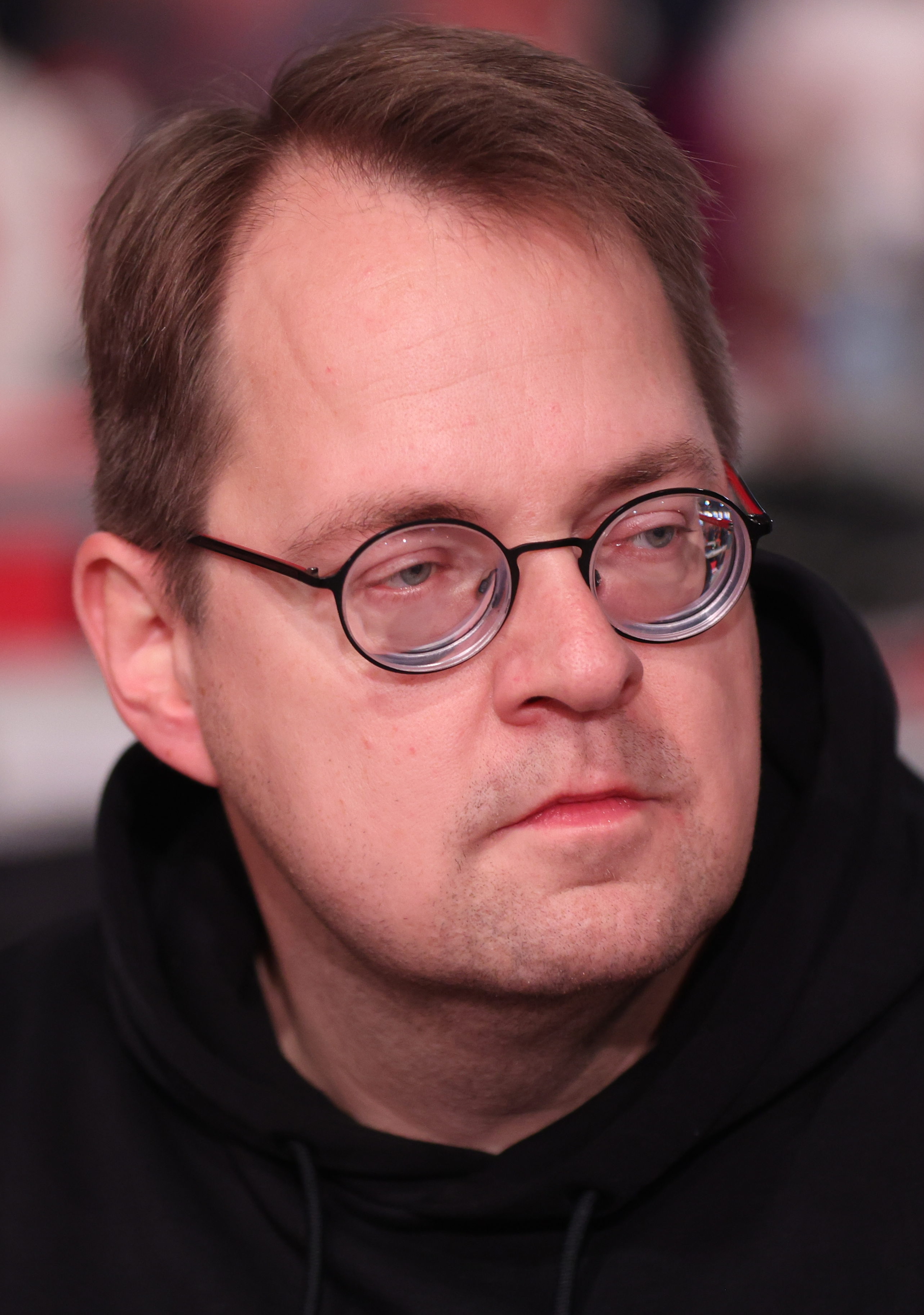
- Pellmann in 2025

Leader of The Left in the Bundestag
- Incumbent
- Assumed office 20 February 2024 Serving with Heidi Reichinnek
- Preceded by: Dietmar Bartsch
- Whip: Christian Görke

Member of the Bundestag for Leipzig II
- Incumbent
- Assumed office 24 September 2017
- Preceded by: Thomas Feist

Personal details
- Born: 11 February 1977 (age 49) Leipzig, Bezirk Leipzig, East Germany
- Party: The Left

Sören Pellmann (born 11 February 1977 in Leipzig, East-Germany) is a German politician who represents The Left. Pellmann has served as a member of the Bundestag from Leipzig II in the state of Saxony since 2017. Since 2024, he has been serving as the Leader of The Left Group in the Bundestag, alongside Heidi Reichinnek.

== Life ==
Pellmann was born in Leipzig, Saxony. His father was the historian and SED-, later PDS-politician Dietmar Pellmann. He graduated at the Polytechnic Secondary School " „Adolf Hennecke“ and then the Lichtenberg-Gymnasium in Leipzig-Grünau, where he passed his Abitur in 1995. This was followed by community service with the city of Leipzig in a home for severely and multiply handicapped children and young people. During his law studies at the University of Leipzig, he worked for Barbara Höll and Heidemarie Lüth, who were members of the German Bundestag at the time. Subsequently, he studied to become a teacher for special schools with a focus on education for the mentally handicapped and education for the learning disabled until 2009. He completed his subsequent legal clerkship at the "Adolph Diesterweg" Learning Special School in Leipzig and at the "Schule Rosenweg" Special School for the Mentally Handicapped in Leipzig.

== Politics ==
Pellmann joined the Party of Democratic Socialism (PDS) on his sixteenth birthday in 1993. He became active in local politics in Leipzig, and was elected to the city council in 2009. In the 2017 German federal election, he ran as The Left's candidate for Leipzig II. He narrowly defeated incumbent Thomas Feist, winning 25.3% of votes to Feist's 24.6%. He became the first member of his party to win a constituency in Saxony, and the only Left MP to win a constituency outside Berlin in 2017.

Pellmann was re-elected in Leipzig II in 2021. While his vote fell slightly to 22.8%, his margin increased to 4.4% as the second-placed candidate, Paula Piechotta of the Greens, won 18.4%. Pellmann's re-election was especially significant since The Left won only 4.9% of votes nationally, just short of the 5% electoral threshold, and was only entitled to proportional representation due to winning three constituencies: Berlin-Treptow-Köpenick, Berlin-Lichtenberg, and Leipzig II.

Within the party, Pellmann was considered a supporter of Sahra Wagenknecht. After the Russian invasion of Ukraine in February 2022, he and five other Left MdBs joined Wagenknecht in issuing a joint statement attributing responsibility for the war in part to the United States and NATO. This was met with harsh criticism from a number of party members, including foreign policy spokesman and party elder Gregor Gysi.

At the Left party congress in June, Pellmann ran unsuccessfully for the party co-leadership, winning 176 votes (31.6%) to MEP Martin Schirdewan's 341 (61.3%).

In February 2024, Pellmann was elected co-leader of the Left's reorganised Bundestag group alongside Heidi Reichinnek, defeating Clara Bünger 14 votes to 13.

At the 2025 German federal election Sören Pellmann won the direct mandate of Leipzig II electoral district.
