= Gesine Lötzsch =

German politician (born 1961)

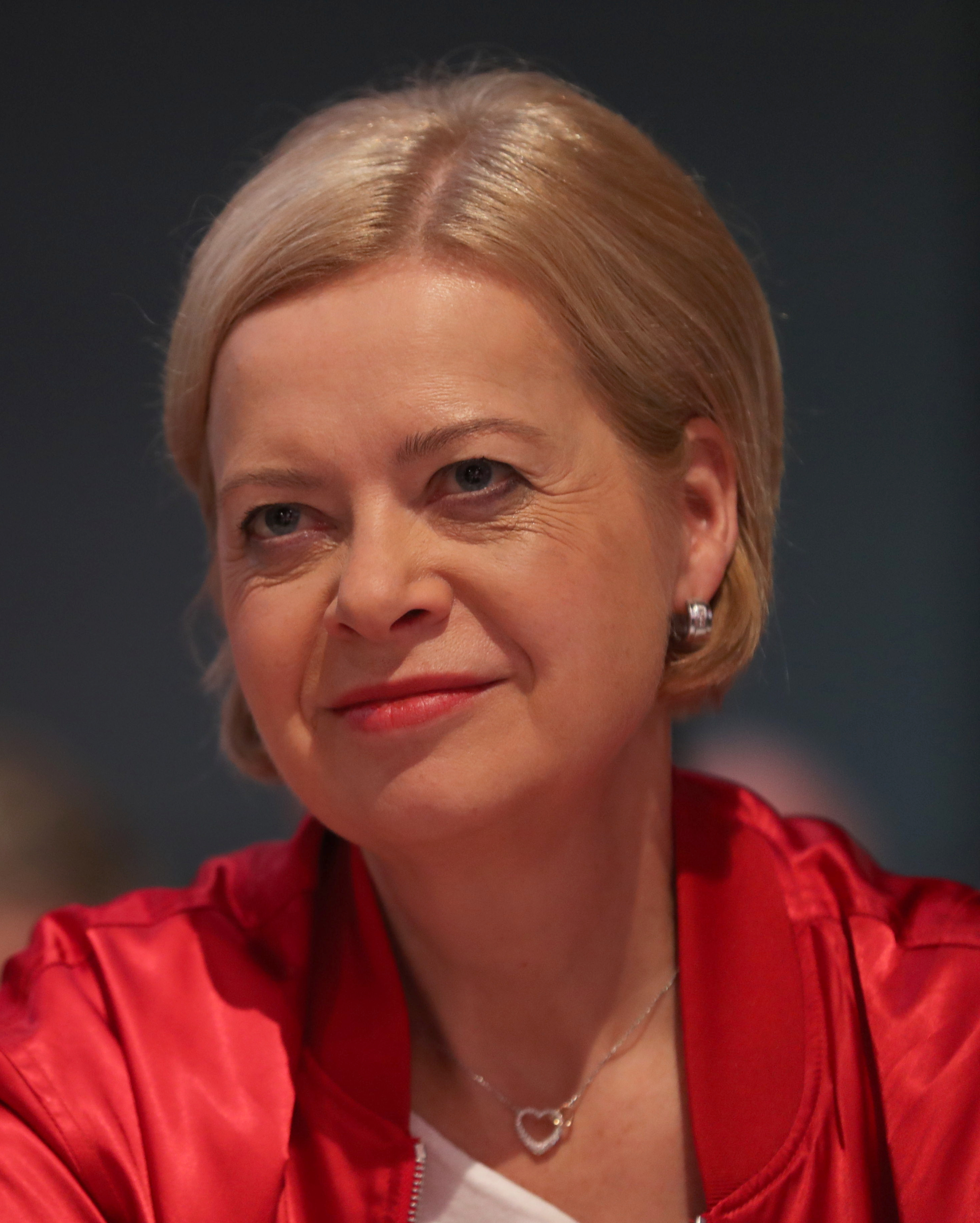
- Lötzsch in 2018

Member of the Bundestag; for Berlin-Lichtenberg
- In office 17 October 2002 – 25 March 2025
- Preceded by: Christa Luft
- Succeeded by: Ines Schwerdtner

Personal details
- Born: 7 August 1961 (age 65) Lichtenberg, East Berlin, East Germany
- Party: Die Linke (since 2007)
- Other political affiliations: SED (1984–1989); PDS (1989–2007)
- Education: Humboldt University of Berlin
- Occupation: Politician

Gesine Lötzsch (German pronunciation: [ɡeˈziːnə ˈløːtʃ]; born 7 August 1961) is a German politician of the left-wing party Die Linke ("The Left"). In 2010, with Klaus Ernst, she was elected president of the party.

== Early life ==
Born at Berlin-Lichtenberg in what then was East Germany, Lötzsch joined the Socialist Unity Party of Germany in 1984 and continued a member of its successor parties: the SED-PDS (1989–1990), the PDS, (1990–2005), Die Linkspartei.PDS (2005–2007), and from 2007, Die Linke.

== Political career ==
In 2002, as a candidate of the Party of Democratic Socialism, Lötzsch was elected to the German parliament (the Bundestag) for the constituency Berlin-Lichtenberg, which she represented until 2025. For her first term, she and Petra Pau were the only PDS deputies in the chamber as the party failed to surpass the 5% electoral threshold. In the 2021 German federal elections her winning her constituency again proved pivotal as her party again failed to surpass the electoral threshold but gained representation proportional to its vote share due to having won three constituencies (in addition to hers Berlin-Treptow-Köpenick won by Gregor Gysi and Leipzig II won by Sören Pellmann).

Lötzsch has been criticized for suggesting that former employees of the Stasi, the secret police of the former East German state, should be allowed to serve in parliaments and governments. The leader of the Alliance '90/The Greens, Claudia Roth, claimed that Lötzsch wants to "sweep the past under the carpet". Lötzsch's local party group in Berlin-Lichtenberg has invited former Stasi employees and informers to speak on several occasions with her support: for instance, Erich Mielke's immediate deputy, Werner Grossmann, was invited as a speaker. Green member of parliament Wolfgang Wieland criticized her for appearing as a speaker before a revisionist association, the Initiativgemeinschaft zum Schutz der sozialen Rechte (tr. the Community Initiative for the Protection of the Social Rights).

== Personal life ==
Lötzsch was married to Ronald Lötzsch (1931–2018), who in 2010 was revealed to have been an unofficial collaborator for the Stasi.
