= Caren Lay =

German politician

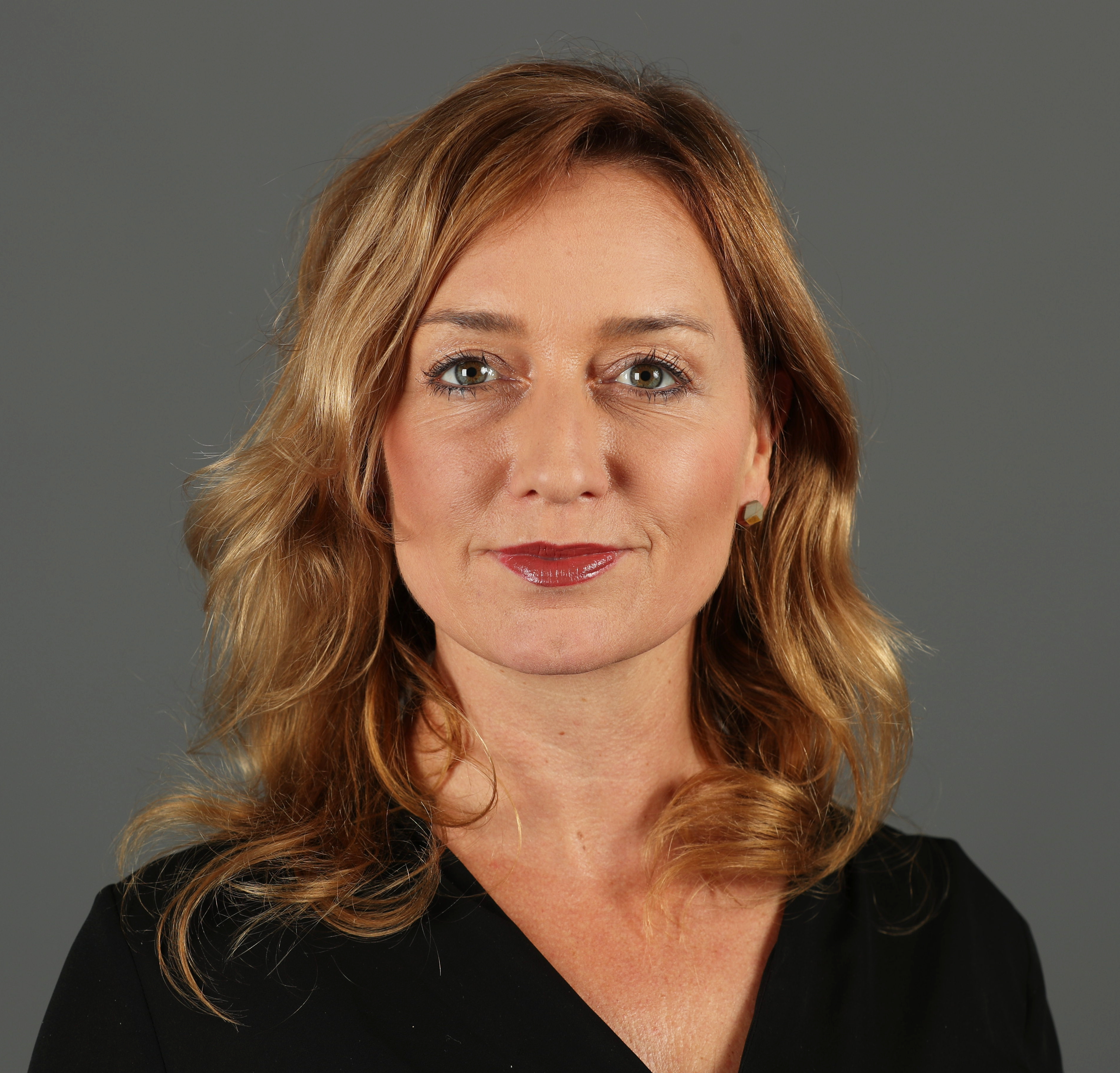
- Lay in 2020

Member of the Bundestag for Saxony
- Incumbent
- Assumed office 27 September 2009

Member of the Landtag of Saxony
- In office 19 September 2004 – 30 August 2009

Deputy chairperson of the Die Linke parliamentary group
- Incumbent
- Assumed office 2017

Personal details
- Born: Caren Nicole Lay; 11 December 1972 (age 53) Neuwied, Rhineland Palatinate, West Germany (now Germany)
- Party: The Left
- Occupation: Politician
- Website: caren-lay.de

Caren Nicole Lay (born 11 December 1972) is a German politician (Die Linke). She has been a member of the Bundestag since 2009 and has been deputy chairperson of the Die Linke parliamentary group in the Bundestag since 2017. From 2012 to 2018, she was one of the deputy chairpersons of her party. In November 2019, Lay unsuccessfully applied to succeed Sahra Wagenknecht as co-chairperson of the Die Linke parliamentary group in the Bundestag. She was defeated by Amira Mohamed Ali in a competitive vote.

== Life and work ==
Born in Neuwied, Lay comes from a working-class family. After graduating from high school in Andernach, she studied sociology with a focus on political science and women's studies at the Philipps-Universität Marburg and the Johann Wolfgang Goethe-Universität Frankfurt am Main, as well as in Pennsylvania. After graduating with a degree in sociology, she first worked as a lecturer at the Free University of Berlin from 1999 to 2000, and as a parliamentary-scientific advisor in the PDS faction of the Landtag of Saxony in Dresden from 2000 to 2003. She then moved to the Ministry of Consumer Protection, Food and Agriculture as a speechwriter for Renate Künast, the Federal Minister responsible at the time. In the course of the protests against the Agenda 2010 of the red-green government, Lay joined the PDS in 2004.

== Member of parliament ==
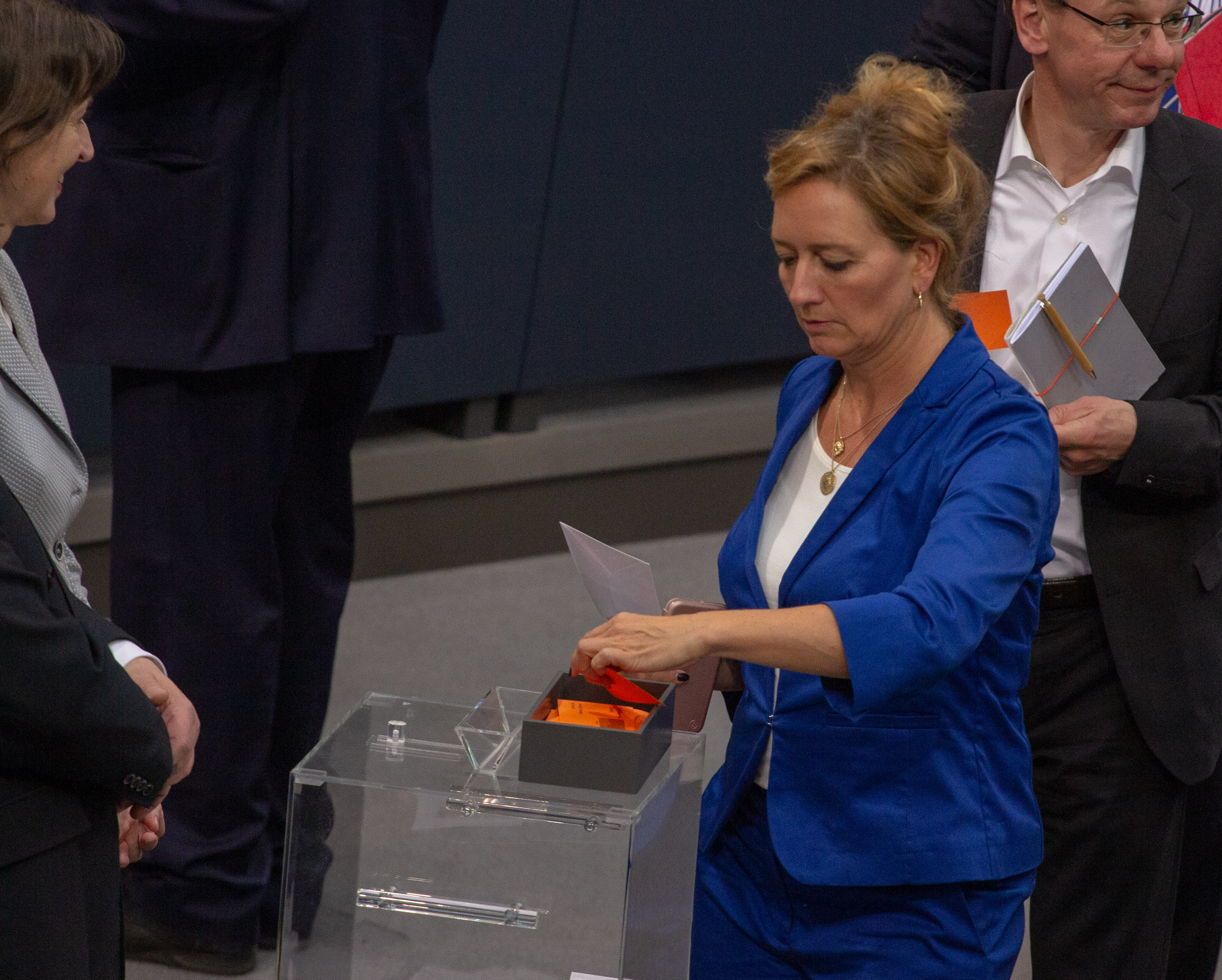
Lay in 2019

=== Member of the Landtag of Saxony (2004 to 2009) ===
Lay was a member of the Landtag of Saxony from 2004 to 2009, deputy leader of the Left Party, and spokesperson for labor market policy. In addition, she was Parliamentary Secretary of the parliamentary group from 2007 to 2009. In addition, she was a member of the board there, a member of the Committee on Economic Affairs, Labour and Transport, as well as Chairwoman of the 2nd Committee of Inquiry into the Corruption Affair and Chairwoman of the 1st Commission of Enquiry on Demographic Development.

=== Member of the Bundestag (since 2009) ===
Since 2009, Caren Lay has been a member of the Bundestag. She was elected to the Bundestag via the Saxony state list. The party nominated her as one of its eight top candidates in January 2013. In October 2013 she became deputy parliamentary party leader and head of the working group "Structural and Regional Policy." From 2009 until the end of 2015, she was the spokesperson for consumer policy in her parliamentary group. Since January 2016, Lay has been spokesperson for rent, construction and housing policy for the parliamentary group Die Linke in the Bundestag. After the Bundestag elections in 2017, she was elected as deputy leader of the parliamentary group.

In March 2014, the Bundestag lifted her immunity so that the Dresden public prosecutor's office could continue to investigate against her; Lay had participated in a obstructing a Nazi demonstration in Dresden in 2011. Lay and her parliamentary group colleague Michael Leutert, who was also affected, rejected criminal prosecution as unlawful, citing an expert opinion of the Bundestag's Scientific Service, according to which the Saxon Assembly Act was not valid at the time of the crime due to a formal error and the Federal Act was not applicable to the demonstrators. The Immunity Committee did not follow this opinion. On 12 February 2015, the Dresden public prosecutor's office discontinued the proceedings without conditions or payments on the grounds that the guilt appeared to be slight.

On 12 November 2019, Lay unsuccessfully applied to succeed Sahra Wagenknecht as Co-Chairwoman of the Left Parliamentary Group in the Bundestag. She lost to Amira Mohamed Ali by 29 votes to 36.

== Extra-parliamentary work ==
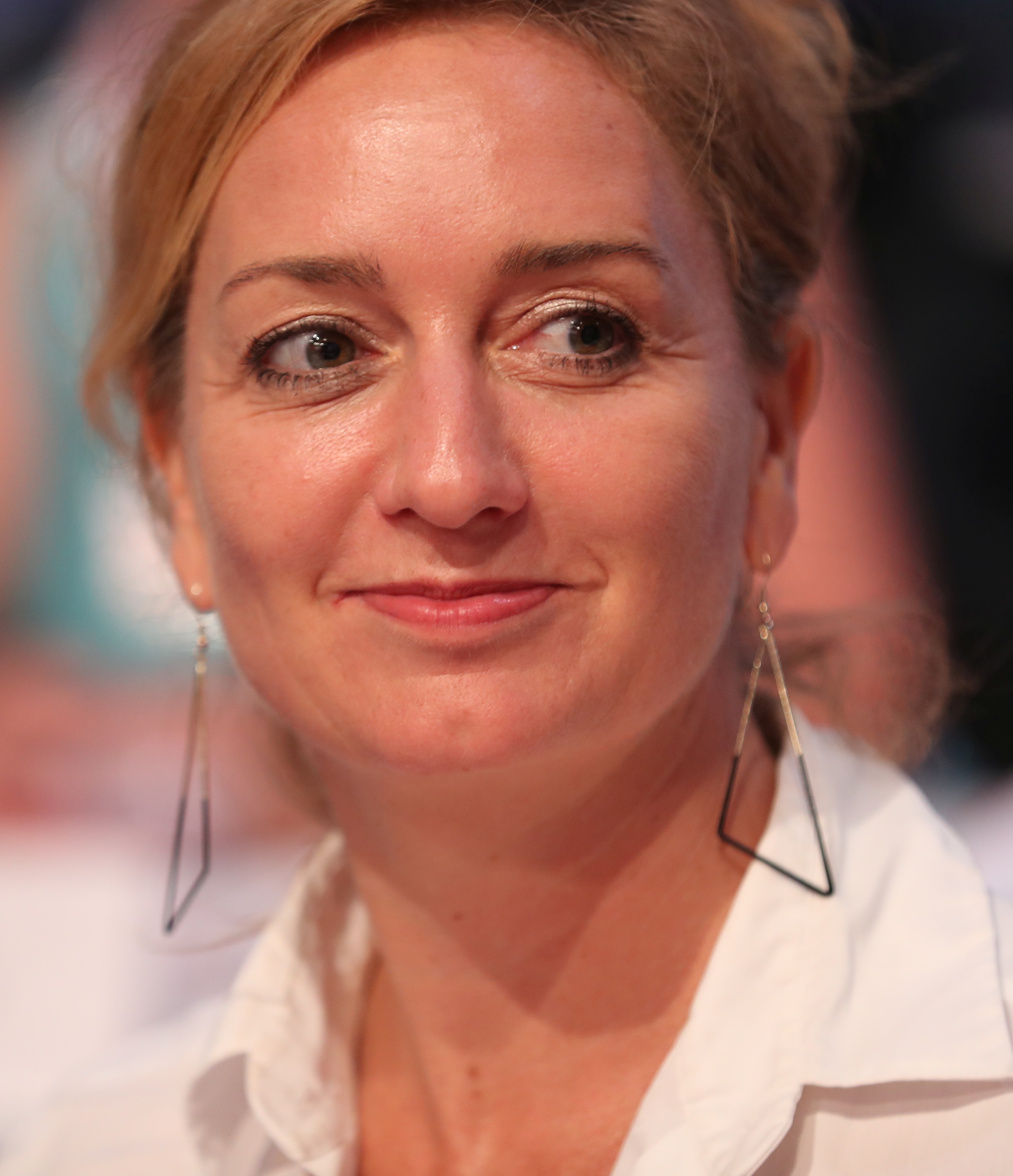
Lay at the federal party conference 2018 in Leipzig

From 2007 to 2018, Lay was a member of the executive committee of the party Die Linke. She was Federal Executive Director from 2010 to 2012, and then Deputy Chairwoman, from 2012 to 2018, of her party. When the party executive committee was re-elected in June 2018, she decided not to run for office again, stating that she wanted to concentrate on her work as deputy parliamentary party leader in the Bundestag.

Lay is considered a representative of the libertarian, undogmatic spectrum of her party. In autumn 2006 she initiated the foundation of the Emancipatory Left, together with Katja Kipping.

In 2007, she joined the Forum of Democratic Socialism caucus. At the Federal Congress in April 2008, she was elected one of the Forum's three speakers, along with Stefan Liebich and Inga Nitz. After her nomination as Federal Managing Director in 2010, she gave up this position. She later resigned from the FDS.

In the run-up to the Göttingen Federal Party Congress 2012, she pleaded together with Katja Kipping, Katharina Schwabedissen, Jan van Aken and Thomas Nord for a "Third Way" beyond the reform-oriented and traditional wing of the left.

Caren Lay is a member of the trade union ver.di, the German Tenants' Association, the nature conservation association BUND, the Rosa Luxemburg Foundation, the VVN-BdA, Attac, the Rent and Living Network, and the German Alpine Club.

== Political positions ==
Caren Lay is active in housing policy and has been the spokesperson for rent, construction and housing policy of the Die Linke parliamentary group in the Bundestag since 2016.

Caren Lay promotes a "red-red-green" government alliance at federal level. Together with members of the SPD, Alliance 90/The Greens, and the Left Party in the Bundestag, she organized several meetings of the "Trialogue for a progressive policy."

Lay is committed to stopping the decline of public housing. For a long time, she also advocated an amendment to the Basic Law that would allow the federal government to continue to provide the Länder with money for social housing even after the funds for unbundling from Federalism Reform I had expired. Lay demanded that the federal government set up a public housing program based on the Vienna model. Through Lay's proposal, with 10 billion euros annually, the federal government should promote social, non-profit, municipal and cooperative housing construction. In this way, 250,000 new social housing units would be built each year. In addition, municipalities are to bring formerly public housing back into public ownership. In four years, a total of 1.5 million new and affordable apartments would be built. Lay thinks that such a housing construction program could initiate a "turnaround in the housing market." She also believes that the government itself should build affordable housing with long-term social ties.

Lay is committed to ensuring that public land is no longer privatized. Her opinion is that public land should only be granted with hereditary building lease. She lobbies for a new renter's movement to be established in Germany, which would put pressure on the federal government. In this context, she participated in the protests against the Federal Government's Housing Summit and the Alternative Housing Summit in September 2018. Lay advocates the reintroduction of the housing public benefit, so that developers who are oriented towards the common good can receive tax breaks with investment subsidies if they build affordable rented apartments for this purpose on a permanent basis.

As federal manager, she initiated a "rent policy offensive" of the Left Party in spring 2012.

Lay regularly takes part in anti-Nazi protests, including a blockade against the annual Nazi march in Dresden in 2011. Her citizens' offices in Bautzen and Hoyerswerda have already been attacked several times as a result. For her, the fight against the shift to the right is "one of the most urgent tasks of the left, indeed of the entire enlightened society."

As a construction worker with West German roots, Lay advocates a different economic and structural policy for East Germany. She advocates a socio-ecologically compatible structural turnaround in Lusatia. In addition, she advocates the establishment of equal living conditions in East and West.

Caren Lay is rooted in the women's movement. Within her party, she has developed a mentoring program for young women. In 2011 she initiated the Left Party's Clara Zetkin Women's Prize as Federal Executive Director, which honors projects that aim to improve women's living conditions and gender equality. Since then, the prize has been awarded annually.

== Controversies ==
In December 2017, the planned awarding of a prize to Ken Jebsen in Berlin's Babylon cinema caused controversy within the Left Party. The Berlin Senator for Culture Klaus Lederer (Die Linke) publicly criticized the award ceremony. He was then criticized by some party members. A rally was announced in front of the federal office, where former Left Party politician Wolfgang Gehrcke also announced his participation. On the initiative of Caren Lay, the executive committee of the Left Party then distanced itself in a motion entitled "Clear Edge against Third Position" in which it "unequivocally dissociated itself from the activities of right-wing populists, nationalists, conspiracy theorists and anti-Semites who want to make right-wing populist patterns of explaining the world and 'transverse front' strategies socially acceptable", and expressed its solidarity with Klaus Lederer.
