= Amira Mohamed Ali =

German politician (born 1980)

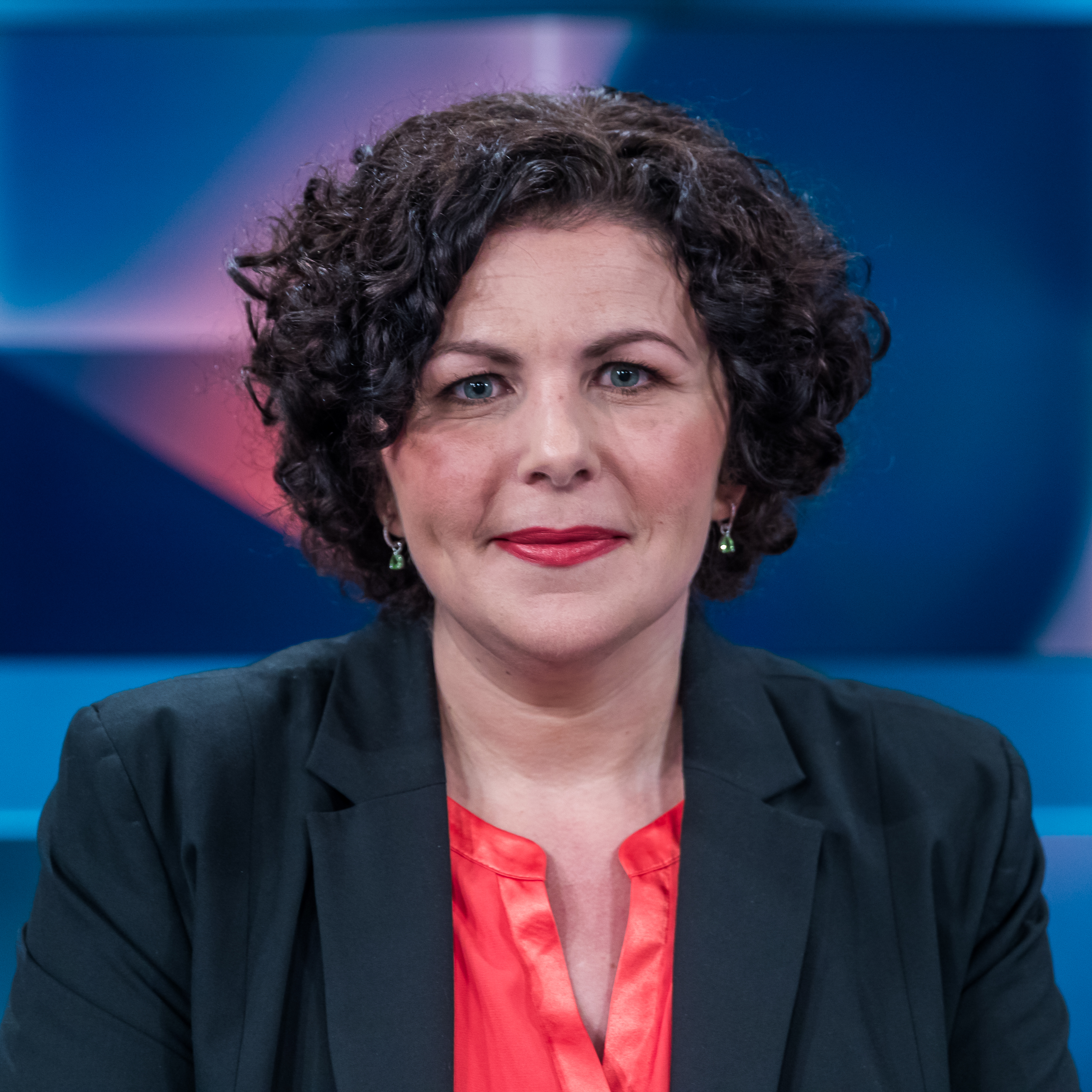
- Mohamed Ali in 2024

Leader of the Sahra Wagenknecht Alliance
- Incumbent
- Assumed office 8 January 2024 Serving with Fabio De Masi
- Preceded by: Position established

Member of the Bundestag for Lower Saxony
- In office 24 October 2017 – 23 February 2025

Parliamentary Co-Chair of The Left in the Bundestag
- In office 12 November 2019 – 25 October 2023 Serving with Dietmar Bartsch
- Preceded by: Sahra Wagenknecht
- Succeeded by: Dietmar Bartsch

Personal details
- Born: Amira Mohamed Ali; 16 January 1980 (age 46) Hamburg, West Germany
- Citizenship: Germany
- Party: Bündnis Sahra Wagenknecht (since 2023)
- Other political affiliations: The Left (until 2023)

Amira Mohamed Ali (Arabic: أميرة محمد علي; born 16 January 1980) is a German politician who served as a member of the Bundestag from 2017 to 2025 and has been one of the federal co-chairs of the BSW since 2024. From 12 November 2019 till October 2023, she was the parliamentary co-chairperson of The Left alongside Dietmar Bartsch.

In October 2023, she left The Left alongside others like Sahra Wagenknecht to found a new party. Mohamed Ali was the chairwoman of the board of the Bündnis Sahra Wagenknecht-Association which was founded to prepare a new party in January 2024. She became chairwoman of the association and, upon the party's founding on 8 January 2024, assumed the co-leadership of the newly established BSW alongside Sahra Wagenknecht. On 6 December 2025, Mohamed Ali was reaffirmed as co-chair of the BSW, this time alongside Fabio De Masi.

== Life ==
Amira Mohamed Ali was born in Hamburg and grew up in Hamburg-Fuhlsbüttel. Her father is Egyptian and her mother is German. After graduating from the Gelehrtenschule des Johanneums in Hamburg-Winterhude in 1998, Mohamed Ali studied law at the universities of Heidelberg and Hamburg, where she began and completed her studies. She completed her legal clerkship at the Higher Regional Court of Oldenburg between 2005 and 2007.

She was admitted to the bar in 2008 and worked as an in-house lawyer and contract manager for an automotive supplier until 2017. She is a member of IG Metall and the German Animal Welfare Association.

Mohamed Ali is married and has lived in Oldenburg since 2005.

== Political activity ==
Mohamed Ali has been a board member of the Oldenburg/Ammerland district association of the party Die Linke in Lower Saxony since 2015. She ran for political office for the first time in the 2016 local elections on list number 2 in electoral district VI of the city of Oldenburg. In this election, the Left Party achieved its best result in a local election since its foundation.

Mohamed Ali ran as a direct candidate for the Oldenburg-Ammerland constituency in the 2017 federal election. She was elected number 5 on her party's Lower Saxony state list and was elected to the Bundestag through that list. In the 19th Bundestag, she is a member of the Committee for Legal Affairs and Consumer Protection and the Committee for Food and Agriculture. She was spokesperson for consumer protection and for animal protection of the Left parliamentary group in the Bundestag.

On 12 November 2019, she was elected as Sahra Wagenknecht's successor–alongside Dietmar Bartsch–as co-chair of the parliamentary group. Mohamed Ali won in a competitive vote against Caren Lay, 36 votes to 29.

In 2023, the dispute between left-wing populist and conservative Sarah Wagenknecht and the party leadership came to a head. As a result, Wagenknecht put forward the prospect of founding her own party. In August 2023, Mohamed Ali, who currently belongs to the Wagenknecht Group, announced that she would be stepping back from co-chair of the parliamentary group because of the dispute. She said that it was difficult for her to represent the course of the party board in the Bundestag.

=== Founding a new party and leaving The Left ===
Mohamed Ali was involved in the founding of Bündnis Sahra Wagenknecht (BSW), a registered association with the goal of founding a new political party in Germany. Mohamed Ali serves as the chairperson of the organization. At a press conference on 23 October 2023, which announced BSW to the public, she announced that she had left The Left party.

=== Political positions ===
In December 2024, the Bundestag decided to better protect the Federal Constitutional Court against political attacks. For this purpose, the structure (16 judges and two senates) was incorporated into the basic law. All parties (CDU/CSU, FDP, A90/Greens, SPD, The Left) voted for the proposed action, except for the right-wing AfD and the BSW. Mohamed Ali described the inclusion of the Bundeverfassungsgericht in the basic law, which can only be changed with a 2/3 majority, as "undemocratic" and "arrogance of those in power".
