= Gregor Gysi =

German lawyer and politician (born 1948)

Gregor Gysi MdB
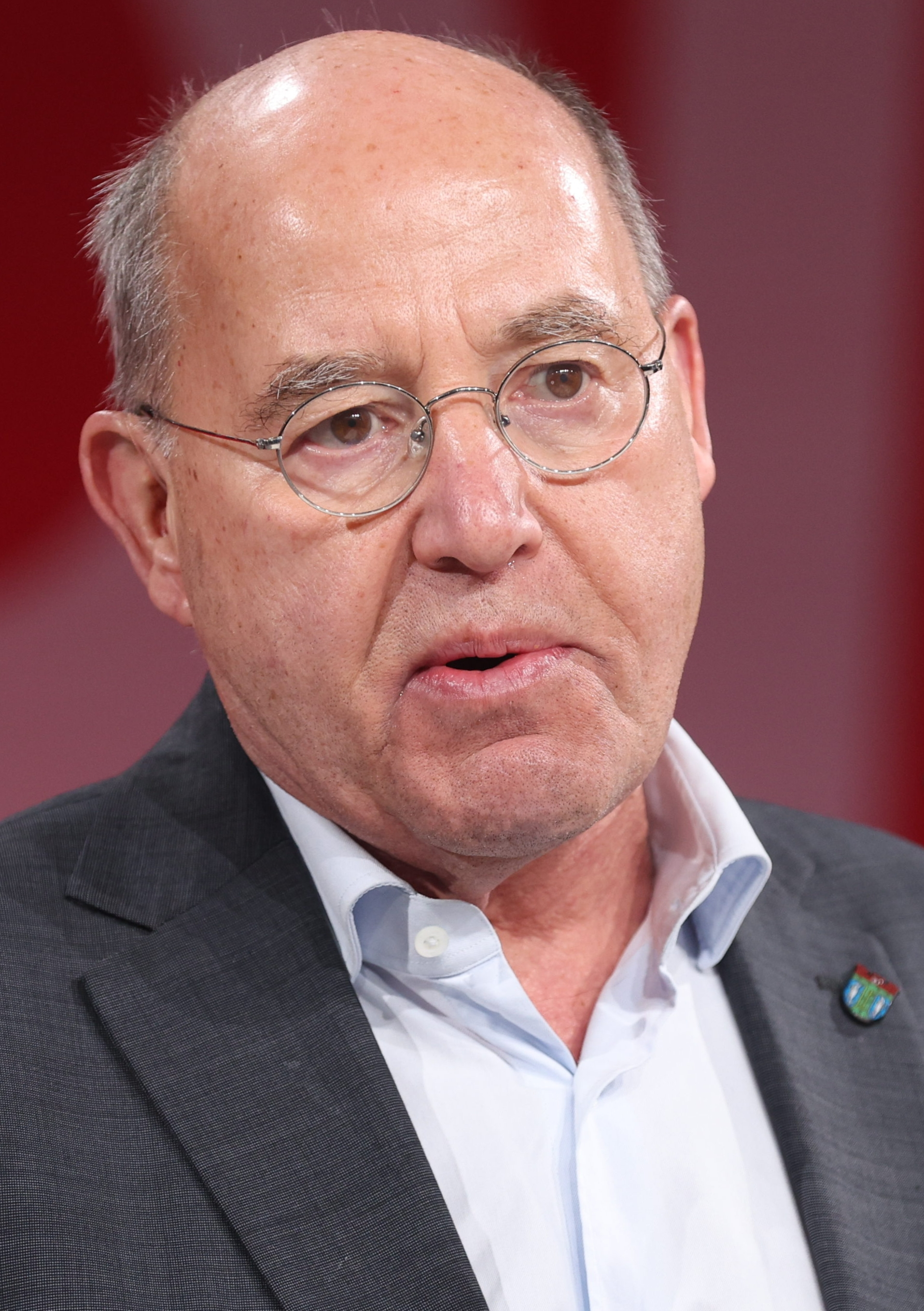
- Gysi in 2025

President by right of age of the Bundestag
- Incumbent
- Assumed office 25 March 2025
- Preceded by: Peter Ramsauer

President of the Party of the European Left
- In office 17 December 2016 – 15 December 2019
- Preceded by: Pierre Laurent
- Succeeded by: Heinz Bierbaum

Leader of the Opposition
- In office 17 December 2013 – 12 October 2015
- Chancellor: Angela Merkel
- Succeeded by: Sahra Wagenknecht; Dietmar Bartsch

Leader of The Left in the Bundestag
- In office 18 October 2005 – 12 October 2015
- Preceded by: Position established
- Succeeded by: Sahra Wagenknecht; Dietmar Bartsch

Member of the Bundestag
- Incumbent
- Assumed office 18 October 2005
- Preceded by: Siegfried Scheffler
- Constituency: Berlin-Treptow-Köpenick
- In office 3 October 1990 – 1 February 2002
- Preceded by: Constituency established
- Succeeded by: Bärbel Grygier
- Constituency: Volkskammer (1990); Berlin-Hellersdorf-Marzahn (1990–2002)
Berlin state politics (2001–2002)
Governing Mayor of Berlin
In office 17 January 2002 – 29 August 2002
Governing Mayor	Klaus Wowereit
Preceded by	Klaus Böger
Succeeded by	Harald Wolf
Senator for Labour, Economics and Women of Berlin
In office 17 January 2002 – 29 August 2002
Governing Mayor	Klaus Wowereit
Preceded by	Juliane von Friesen
Succeeded by	Harald Wolf
Member of the Berlin House of Representatives; for Marzahn-Hellersdorf 5
In office 29 November 2001 – 6 August 2002
Preceded by	Mario Czaja
Succeeded by	Steffen Zillich
Early federal politics (1989–2001)
Leader of the Party of Democratic Socialism in the Bundestag
In office 3 October 1990 – 2 October 2000
Preceded by	Position established
Succeeded by	Roland Claus
Leader of the Party of Democratic Socialism
In office 18 December 1989 – 31 January 1993
Preceded by	Himself (as Leader of the Socialist Unity Party of Germany)
Succeeded by	Lothar Bisky
Member of the Volkskammer for Berlin
In office 5 April 1990 – 2 October 1990
Preceded by	Constituency established
Succeeded by	Constituency abolished
Leader of the Socialist Unity Party of Germany
In office 9 December 1989 – 17 December 1989
Preceded by	Egon Krenz
Succeeded by	Himself (as Leader of the Party of Democratic Socialism)

Personal details
- Born: Gregor Florian Gysi; 16 January 1948 (age 78) Lichtenberg, East Berlin, Soviet occupation zone of Germany (now Germany)
- Party: The Left (2007–present)
- Other political affiliations: SED (1967–1989); PDS (1989–2007); WASG (2005–2007)
- Spouse: Andrea Gysi (m. 1996; div. 2013)
- Children: 3
- Parent: Klaus Gysi (father)
- Education: Humboldt University of Berlin (Dipl.-Jur., PhD)
- Occupation: Politician; lawyer
- Website: gregorgysi.de

Gregor Florian Gysi (German pronunciation: [ˈɡʁeːɡoːɐ̯ ˈɡiːzi]; born 16 January 1948) is a German attorney, former president of the Party of the European Left and a prominent politician of The Left (Die Linke) political party.

He belonged to the reformist wing of the governing Socialist Unity Party of Germany at the time of the pro-democracy transition inspired by then Soviet leader Mikhail Gorbachev. He has strongly denied allegations that he used to assist the Stasi, the East German secret police. He was the last leader of the Socialist Unity Party of Germany and led the effort that transformed it into the post-Communist Party of Democratic Socialism (PDS), forerunner of The Left.

== Family background ==
Gysi was born in Berlin-Lichtenberg in East Berlin, Soviet Zone of Germany. His father was Klaus Gysi, a high-ranking official in East Germany who served as the Minister of Culture from 1966 to 1973. His mother, Irene Olga Lydia Gysi (née Lessing; 1912–2007), was the sister of political activist Gottfried Lessing, who was married to British writer and Nobel laureate Doris Lessing during his exile in Southern Rhodesia. The surname "Gysi" is of Swiss-German origin. He is of partial Jewish ancestry; his paternal grandmother was Jewish, as was one of his maternal great-grandfathers. One of his maternal great-grandmothers was Russian.

== Career ==
=== Pre-1989 ===
Gysi's political career began in the then-ruling Socialist Unity Party of Germany (SED) of East Germany, to which he was admitted in 1967. In 1971 he became a licensed attorney, and during the 1970s and 1980s defended several prominent dissidents, including Rudolf Bahro, Robert Havemann, Ulrike Poppe, and Bärbel Bohley.

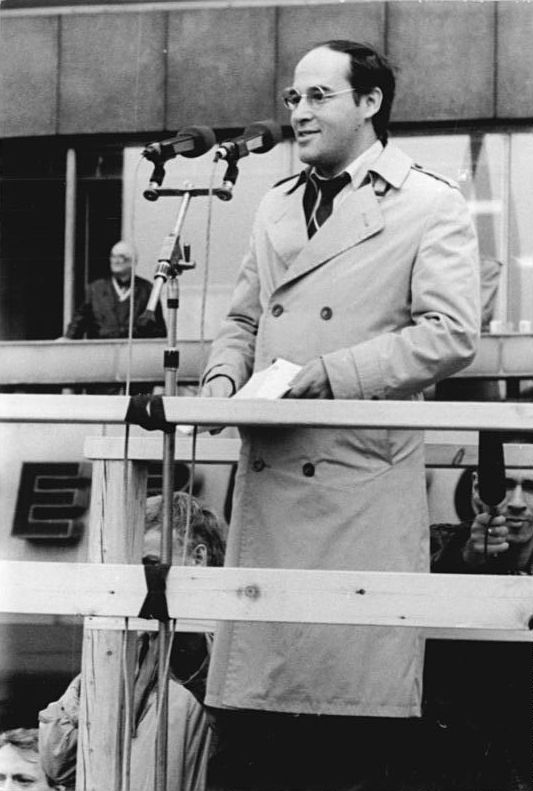
Gregor Gysi at the Alexanderplatz demonstration in November 1989

In addition to his legal work, Gysi emerged as one of East Germany's leading Gorbachev-inspired political reformists within the SED, especially towards the end of the 1980s. In 1989, he and a group of lawyers presented a counter-draft to the government's Travel Bill, which authorised mass public demonstrations. This led to a mass rally on East-Berlin's Alexanderplatz on 4 November in which he spoke and called for reforms, including free elections. In December 1989, he became a member of a special SED party session investigating official corruption and abuse of power.

=== Fall of Communism ===
In an interview conducted in 2011, Gysi recalled that in late 1989 he had become the attorney for several of the people who were arrested in the first early public protests. As such he became known to leading figures in the Artistic and Cultural unions and was contacted by a group of actresses about the legality of a large demonstration. He recalls having examined the laws and advising them that they could apply for such a permit from the police and the worst outcome would be that their request could be denied, but they would not be breaking any law or doing anything illegal. He further recalls assisting the group in requesting and completing the appropriate forms and paperwork required for such a permit.

In December 1989, Egon Krenz, the last Communist leader of East Germany, resigned all of his posts. Gysi was elected as the party's chairman. He did not, however, become the leader of East Germany; the SED had abandoned its monopoly of power on 1 December. In his first speech, Gysi declared that the SED had brought the country to ruin, repudiating everything it had done since 1949. He declared that the party needed to adopt a new form of socialism.

To that end, he immediately set about transforming the SED into a democratic socialist party. Before the year was out, the last hardliners in the SED leadership had either resigned or been pushed out. On 16 December, the SED was renamed the Socialist Unity Party – Party of Democratic Socialism (SED-PDS), it later became simply the Party of Democratic Socialism (PDS). Gysi remained as party chairman, and in March 1990 was elected to the Volkskammer in the first free election of that body. The Volkskammer dissolved itself upon German reunification on 3 October 1990, but 144 members, Gysi among them, were chosen to join the 11th Bundestag which had been elected in January 1987. About 10 weeks later, on December 1990, the upcoming regular Bundestag election would be held as all-German election.

=== Post-unification ===
In the first post-reunification all-German elections, he was elected to the Bundestag from Berlin's Hellersdorf–Marzahn constituency, and served there until 2000. He remained chairman of the PDS through 1998, and then from 1998 to 2000 served as chairman of the party's parliamentary group.

In 1992, it was alleged Gysi was an informer (Inoffizieller Mitarbeiter, IM) of East Germany's Ministry for State Security (the Stasi). He denied these allegations, and the matter was largely dropped due to his parliamentary immunity. In 1995, the Hamburg state court ruled in Gysi's favour in a complaint against Bärbel Bohley, Gysi's former client, who had accused him of Stasi collaboration. However, the allegations were raised again in 1996, and this time the Bundestag voted to revoke his immunity and proceed with an investigation.

In 1998, the Bundestag's immunity committee concluded that Gysi had been a collaborator with the Stasi from 1978 to 1989 under the name IM Notar, and fined him 8,000 Deutsche Mark. However, both the Free Democratic Party and his own PDS disputed the verdict, and Gysi appealed against the finding. Despite the affair, he retained his seat in the Bundestag in the 1998 elections.

In 2000, he resigned as chairman of the PDS's parliamentary group, but continued as an active member of the party. Following the victory of a "Red-red" (SPD-PDS) coalition in the 2001 Berlin state election, he was elected Senator for Economics, Labour, and Women's Issues and Deputy Mayor. He emphasised practical issues and advocated the reinstitution of some of what he sees as the better aspects of East Germany's system, such as extended child-care hours and a longer school day. After a scandal involving his use of airline "bonus miles" he had acquired on trips as a Bundestag member, he resigned on 31 July 2002 from the Berlin city government. The resignation was a blow to his public "can-do" image, but he has recovered from that to some extent in the wake of increasing public opposition to a number of new policies of the federal government, like the Hartz reforms lowering unemployment benefits to the levels of mere subsistence welfare, which he strongly opposes.

In late-2004, he survived brain surgery and a heart attack. Formerly a heavy smoker, Gysi quit smoking as a result of surviving the heart attack.

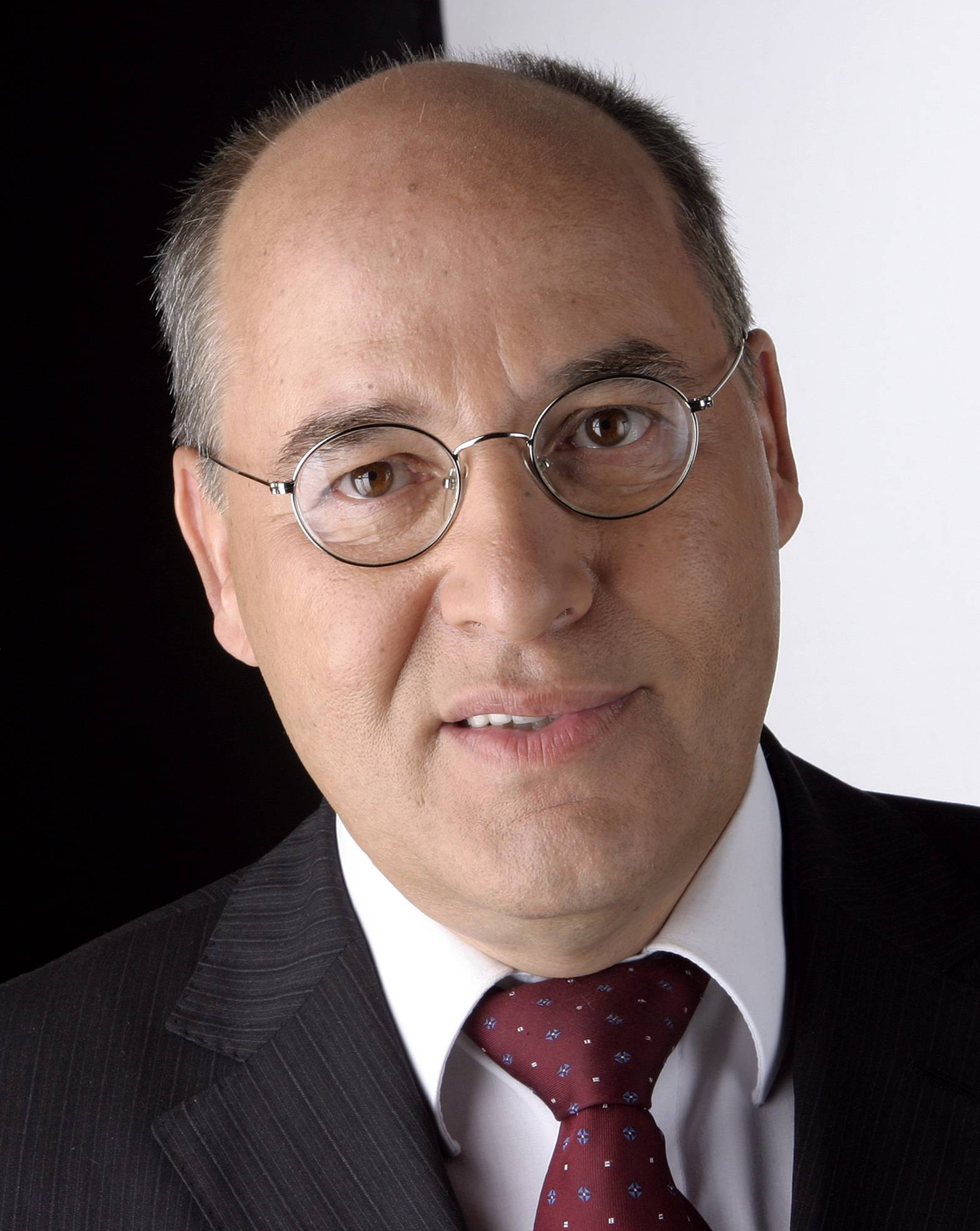
Gysi in 2005

Gysi remained the PDS's undisputed front man in many people's minds and continued to appear in public. In May 2005, when Federal Chancellor Gerhard Schröder planned to call an early election in September, many prominent PDS leaders including chair Lothar Bisky called on Gysi to front their campaign. He was a lead candidate of the PDS, and returned to the Bundestag as the member for Berlin-Treptow-Köpenick. The PDS fought the election in an alliance with the new western-based ElectoralAlternative Labour and Social Justice (WASG), under the new name Left Party.PDS, with Gysi at times sharing a platform with WASG's Oskar Lafontaine, former finance minister (in the first months of the Schröder government) and formerly party leader of the SPD. In June 2007, the PDS and WASG formally merged to form a united party called The Left.

In 2014, Gysi wrote his analysis on the contemporary Ukraine crisis in the Israel Journal of Foreign Affairs, where he described similarities between the United States and Russia in their transgressions of international law. Gysi calls for "a new Ostpolitik" to prevent war and promote "democracy and freedom in Russia". In 2015, Gysi was one of the leading supporters of Greece during the Greek government-debt crisis. He described the then German government as "blackmailers".

Gysi is an outspoken supporter of the Campaign for the Establishment of a United Nations Parliamentary Assembly, an organisation which campaigns for democratic reformation of the United Nations. This is due to his belief in the need for "functioning and democratically legitimate global politics."

In the 2021 German federal elections Gysi once more won his constituency of Berlin-Treptow-Köpenick. While the Left came up short of the five percent electoral threshold, his win, together with those of Gesine Lötzsch in Berlin-Lichtenberg and Sören Pellmann in Leipzig II, qualified the party for list seats proportional to its vote. Under longstanding German law, a party can bypass the electoral threshold by winning three constituency seats.

== Media activities ==
Gysi is one of the most present politicians in German entertainment media. He regularly appears on political entertainment talk shows and is host of conversation programs himself.

In 2019, Gregor Gysi stated to the Bundestag administration that he had received fees for almost 90 lectures, discussions and conversations. On average he has one appearance per week. He also earns money from jobs as lawyer and book publishing.

== Controversies ==
=== Stasi informant "IM Notar" ===
Gysi continues to deny allegations, which first surfaced in 1992, that he was a Stasi informant ("inoffizieller Mitarbeiter"). Invited in 2017 to spell out who, other than himself, "IM Notar" could possibly be, he replied that he had a strong suspicion, backed by a huge amount of information, adding pointedly that whenever the allegations that he himself was "IM Notar" have come before a court, he has "always won". In the absence of certain proof, he is not prepared to disclose the identity of the true "IM Notar".

=== "Toiletgate" (2014) ===
In November 2014, after being invited by Inge Höger and Annette Groth, also members of The Left (Die Linke) to talk with them in the Bundestag, journalists Max Blumenthal and David Sheen learned that Gysi tried to cancel the meetings on the grounds that Blumenthal and Sheen held radical views from which he wished to dissociate the party.

Gysi fled, followed by the two men and other parliamentary members down a parliament corridor and into a bathroom in an incident referred to as "toiletgate". After this event, Blumenthal and Sheen were banned from ever setting foot in the Bundestag again.

== Awards ==
- Morenhovener Lupe (2017)
- Orden wider den tierischen Ernst (2017)
- Goldene Henne (2018)

Party political offices
Preceded by Egon Krenz (as General Secretary)	Chairman of the SED; 1989	Succeeded by Himself as chairman of the PDS
Preceded by Himself as chairman of the SED	Chairman of the PDS; 1989–1993	Succeeded by Lothar Bisky
Preceded by Post created	Chairman of the PDS Parliamentary Group; 1990–2001	Succeeded by Roland Claus
Preceded by Roland Claus	Chairman of the Left Party Parliamentary Group; 2005–2015	Succeeded by Sahra Wagenknecht and Dietmar Bartsch
Political offices
Preceded by Juliane Freifrau von Friesen (Alliance 90/The Greens)	Minister for Economy, Labour and Women in Berlin; 2001–2002	Succeeded by Harald Wolf (PDS)
