= Heidi Reichinnek =

German politician (born 1988)

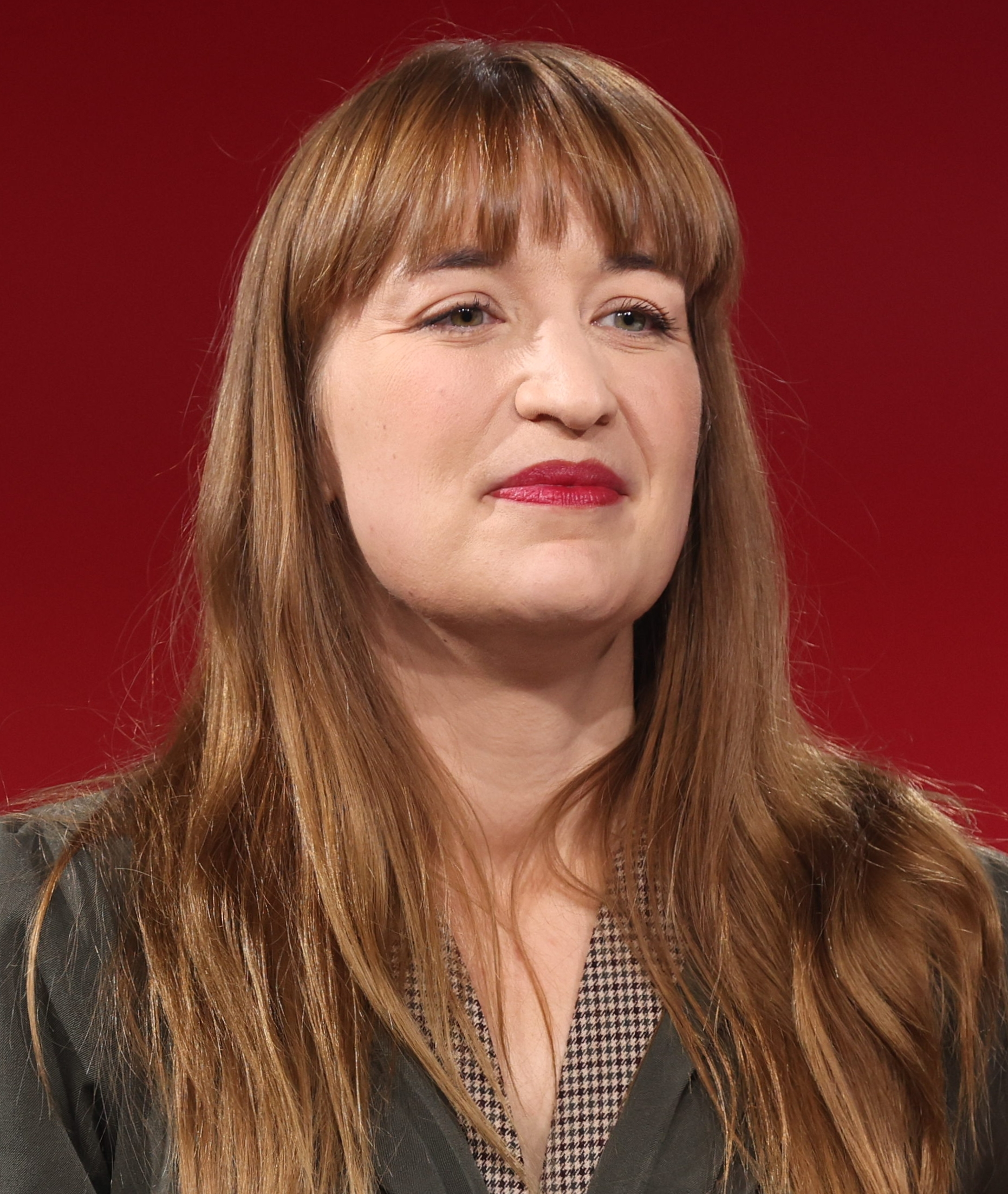
- Reichinnek in 2025

Leader of The Left in the Bundestag
- Incumbent
- Assumed office 20 February 2024 Serving with Sören Pellmann
- Preceded by: Dietmar Bartsch

Member of the Bundestag for Lower Saxony
- Incumbent
- Assumed office 27 September 2021

Leader of The Left in Lower Saxony
- Incumbent
- Assumed office 2 March 2019
- Preceded by: Pia Zimmermann

Personal details
- Born: 19 April 1988 (age 38) Merseburg, Bezirk Halle, East Germany (now Merseburg, Saxony-Anhalt, Germany)
- Party: The Left (since 2015)
- Education: Martin Luther University Halle-Wittenberg (AB); University of Marburg (MA)

Heidi Reichinnek (German: [ˈhaɪdi ˈʁaɪçinɛk]; born 19 April 1988) is a German politician and Member of the Bundestag for the left-wing party Die Linke. Since 2024, she has been serving as the Leader of Die Linke in the Bundestag, alongside Sören Pellmann.

== Biography ==
Reichinnek became interested in politics as a teenager, opposing the Hartz reforms and supporting women's equality and social welfare. At university, she spent a semester abroad in Cairo in the midst of the Arab Spring and witnessed the Egyptian revolution, which furthered her interest in politics. Reichinnek joined Die Linke (The Left) in 2015 and was elected to the city council of Osnabrück the following year. She ran in the 2017 Lower Saxony state election, and placed seventh on the party list, but was not elected. In 2019, she became chairwoman of The Left's Lower Saxony branch.

She contested the constituency of Osnabrück City in the 2021 federal election. She came in fifth place but was elected to the Bundestag on the state list. Within the party, she was considered a supporter of Sahra Wagenknecht, and in 2019 signed an open letter thanking Wagenknecht for her political work. At the federal Left congress in June 2022, Reichinnek ran unsuccessfully for the party co-leadership, winning 199 votes (35.8%) to incumbent Janine Wissler's 319 (57.5%).

In February 2024, Reichinnek was elected co-leader of the Left's reorganised Bundestag group alongside Sören Pellmann, defeating Clara Bünger 14 votes to 13.

She was nominated as one of two leading candidates for The Left in the 2025 German federal election, along with party co-leader Jan van Aken.

In January, Reichinnek went viral for her speech in the Bundestag, when she condemned the Christian Democratic Union (CDU) for collaborating with the far-right Alternative for Germany when they both tried to pass a bill pushing harsher restrictions on illegal immigrants; where she accused the CDU for what she called "paving the way for the resurgence of fascism". The video gained over thirty million views on TikTok, and is attributed for the boost of the left's support in the polls and among the leftist youth in early 2025, just prior to the upcoming election. Reichinnek's campaign appearances and speeches surged in attendance, with Die Tageszeitung referring to her as the party's "social media star".

== Political position ==
As leader, Reichinnek's goal is to end capitalism, and thus has prioritized addressing economic inequality in Germany, including nationalizing housing without compensation, doubling unemployment benefits, and imposing stricter rent limits.

Reichinnek supports progressive social policies, such as being a supporter of artificial insemination, the recognition of all genders, easier access to gender-affirming care, and support of "queer trade unions"; she has also criticized fellow leftist Sahra Wagenknecht after Wagenknecht opposed legislation to support trans rights. Reichinnek also supports increased economic redistribution, accepting refugees seeking asylum in Germany, and the decriminalization of abortion.

On 19 September 2025, Reichinnek stated that what existed in the DDR was not socialism; this position was criticized by German conservatives (from CDU/CSU) and liberals (from FDP), while The Left Berlin split between who supported it (but also criticized "democratic socialism") and who didn't.

== Personal life and social media ==
Reichinnek has a sleeve tattoo of Marxist historical icon Rosa Luxemburg on her arm.

Reichinnek is increasingly active on social media, and has over 1 million followers across social media platforms. With her political, sometimes provocative, short videos, Reichinnek achieved one of the highest reaches of any politician on the video portal TikTok. Through a speech that Reichinnek delivered as a result of the debate about the Influx Limitation Act – often received as a "firewall speech" – she garnered millions of views on social media and increased her follower count on Instagram from 130,000 to 288,000 and on TikTok from 348,000 to 460,000. Stern reported that her social media posts would provide the party a "needed boost" before the 2025 federal election.

The rappers MC Smook and Fruity Luke released the song Heidi Reichinnek (Freestyle) in January 2025. The lyrics contain a mention of Reichinnek by name, stating: "Give it to the poor, give it to the middle, take it away from the rich – when I think, I want to think like Heidi Reichinnek – yes, I dismiss all the right-wing nonsense." Reichinnek and the two rappers also appeared in a joint TikTok video.
