= Klaus Ernst =

German politician (born 1954)

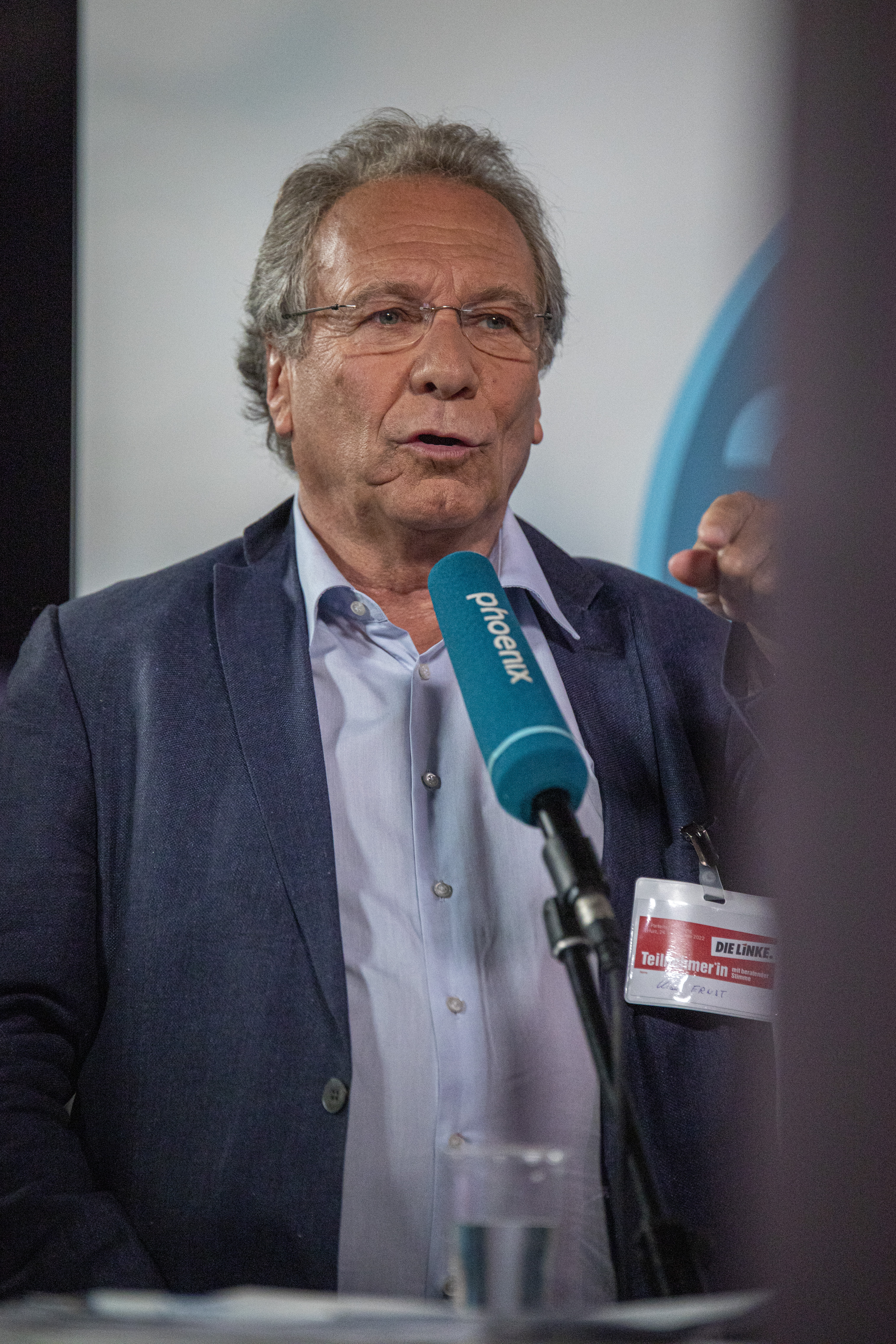
- Ernst in 2022

Member of the German Bundestag
- In office 18 October 2005 – 23 February 2025
- Constituency: Bavaria

Personal details
- Born: 1 November 1954 (age 71) Munich, Bavaria, West Germany (now Germany)
- Party: BSW (2023–present)
- Other political affiliations: SPD (1974–2004); WASG (2005–2007); The Left (2007–2023)

Klaus Ernst (born 1 November 1954) is a German politician and was a leading member of the Labour and Social Justice Party, later The Left and switched to BSW in October 2023.

He is political economist has served as a member of The Left in the Bundestag since 2005, and as of 2010 had been co-chairing the party together with Gesine Lötzsch.

== Career ==
At the age of 15 he left his home and school because of his violent father. In 1970 he found work as an electronics technician and was elected youth representative and member of the works council. In 1972 he became a member of the German Metalworkers' Union and in 1974 he took the chair of regional trade unions youth organization in Munich (until 1979) and became a member of the Social Democratic Party (SPD). From 1979 to 1984 he studied political economy at the University of Hamburg.

After his studies he became a trade union secretary in Stuttgart, responsible for organization, educational work and social plans. In 1995 Ernst was elected plenipotentiary of the IG Metall in Schweinfurt.

He took objection to the Agenda 2010, which he considered anti-social. Instead he pleaded for the establishment of a political alliance, an electoral alternative with regard to the German federal election in 2005. In the summer of 2004 the party executive decided his expulsion from the SPD. After being kicked out of the SPD he would join the Wahlalternative Arbeit und Soziale Gerechtigkeit (WASD) which would merge with the Party For Democratic Socialism to form Die Linke in June 2007. At a party meeting in June 2007 he was made deputy chairman of Die Linke.

Ernst became chairman of the association "Wahlalternative Arbeit und soziale Gerechtigkeit e. V." which had been founded on 3 July 2004. Later he became leader of the new founded Electoral Alternative for Labor and Social Justice, which emerged from the association. In the 19th German Bundestag, Ernst was chairman of the Committee for Economic Affairs and Energy.

=== Switch to BSW ===
In October 2023 he declared that he would quit Die Linke and follow Sahra Wagenknecht into her new party. Ernst rejected the demand to resign from the Bundestag mandate he had won through Die Linke.

== Political opinions ==
Klaus is politically left wing. In January 2022, Ernst argued that Ukraine should maintain its neutral status rather than be admitted into NATO. He criticized halting Nord Stream 2.
