= Berlin-Treptow – Köpenick =

Federal electoral district of Germany

83 Berlin-Treptow-Köpenick
- Electoral district for the Bundestag
- Berlin-Treptow-Köpenick in 2025
- State: Berlin
- Population: 271,100 (2019)
- Electorate: 207,127 (2021)
- Area: 167.7 km^{2}

Current electoral district
- Created: 1994
- Party: The Left
- Member: Gregor Gysi
- Elected: 2005, 2009, 2013, 2017, 2021, 2025

Berlin-Treptow-Köpenick is an electoral constituency (German: Wahlkreis) represented in the Bundestag. It elects one member via first-past-the-post voting. Under the current constituency numbering system, it is designated as constituency 83. It is located in southeastern Berlin, comprising the Treptow-Köpenick borough.

Berlin-Treptow-Köpenick was created for the 1994 federal election. Since 2005, it has been represented by Gregor Gysi of The Left.

== Geography ==
Berlin-Treptow-Köpenick is located in southeastern Berlin. As of the 2021 federal election, it is coterminous with the Treptow-Köpenick borough.

== History ==
Berlin-Treptow-Köpenick was created in 1994 and contained parts of the abolished constituencies of Berlin Friedrichshain – Treptow – Lichtenberg I and Berlin Köpenick – Lichtenberg II. Until 2002, it was named Berlin-Köpenick-Treptow. In the 1994 and 1998 elections, it was constituency 259 in the numbering system. In the 2002 through 2009 elections, it was number 85. In the 2013 through 2021 elections, it was number 84. From the 2025 election, it has been number 83. Its borders have not changed since its creation.

== Members ==
The constituency was first represented by Siegfried Scheffler of the Social Democratic Party (SPD), who served from 1994 to 2005. In 2005, it was won by Gregor Gysi of The Left, then leader of his party's Bundestag group. He was re-elected in 2009, 2013, 2017 and 2021.

Election	Member	Party	%
1994	Siegfried Scheffler	SPD	35.0
1998	Siegfried Scheffler	SPD	37.6
2002	Siegfried Scheffler	SPD	39.3
2005	Gregor Gysi	The Left	40.4
2009	Gregor Gysi	The Left	44.8
2013	Gregor Gysi	The Left	42.2
2017	Gregor Gysi	The Left	39.9
2021	Gregor Gysi	The Left	35.4
2025	Gregor Gysi	The Left	41.8

== Election results ==
=== 2025 election ===
Federal election (2025): Berlin-Treptow – Köpenick
Notes:	Blue background denotes the winner of the electorate vote. Pink background denotes a candidate elected from their party list. Yellow background denotes an electorate win by a list member, or other incumbent. A ✓ or ✗ denotes status of any incumbent, win or lose respectively.						
Party	Candidate	Votes	%	±%	Party votes	%	±%
Left	✓ Gregor Gysi	70,572	41.8	▲6.5	36,609	21.7	▲5.7
AfD	Michael Gleichmann	34,646	20.5	▲8.9	36,410	21.6	▲9.0
CDU	Dustin Hoffmann	23,747	14.1	▲0.4	25,858	15.3	▲2.0
SPD	Ana-Maria Trăsnea	14,472	8.6	▼6.8	21,403	12.7	▼10.5
Greens	Annkatrin Esser	8,081	4.8	▼5.5	20,226	12.0	▼4.1
BSW	Josephine Thyrêt	9,494	5.6	New	15,471	9.2	New
FDP	Sofie-Paulin Nusser	2,961	1.8	▼4.0	4,949	2.9	▼5.0
Tierschutzpartei	Mirko Claus	3,235	1.9	▼1.0	3,017	1.8	▼1.3
Volt					1,546	0.9	▲0.4
PARTEI					1,294	0.8	▼1.2
FW	Marko Schreiter	892	0.5	▼1.0	761	0.5	▼0.9
PdF					367	0.2	New
BD	Randy Witte	367	0.2	New	299	0.2	New
Team Todenhöfer					260	0.2	▼0.3
MERA25					128	0.1	New
MLPD	Claudius Reich	113	0.1	0.0	86	0.1	0.0
BüSo	Helga Zepp-LaRouche	100	0.1	New	72	0.0	0.0
SGP					27	0.0	0.0
Informal votes		1,122			1,019		
Total valid votes		168,680			168,783		
Turnout		169,802	82.1	▲6.4			
Left hold	Majority	35,926	21.3	▲1.3			

=== 2021 election ===
Federal election (2021): Berlin Treptow-Köpenick
Notes:	Blue background denotes the winner of the electorate vote. Pink background denotes a candidate elected from their party list. Yellow background denotes an electorate win by a list member, or other incumbent. A ✓ or ✗ denotes status of any incumbent, win or lose respectively.						
Party	Candidate	Votes	%	±%	Party votes	%	±%
Left	✓ Gregor Gysi	55,372	35.4	▼4.4	24,884	16.0	▼9.2
SPD	Ana-Maria Trăsnea	24,133	15.4	▲1.7	36,564	23.4	▲7.9
CDU	Claudia Pechstein	21,142	13.5	▼5.4	20,559	13.2	▼7.0
AfD	Denis Henkel	17,817	11.4	▼3.6	19,128	12.3	▼4.7
Greens	Annkatrin Esser	16,137	10.3	▲5.3	25,141	16.1	▲8.3
FDP	Carl Grouwet	9,235	5.9	▲2.2	12,641	8.1	▲1.6
Tierschutzpartei	Markus Anhalt	4,565	2.9		4,810	3.1	▲1.6
PARTEI	Daniel Günther	2,535	1.6	▼0.6	3,002	1.9	▼0.6
FW	Michael Knape	2,421	1.5	▲0.8	2,215	1.4	▲0.9
Die Grauen					2,162	1.4	▲0.8
dieBasis	Maria Macheleidt	1,882	1.2				
Volt					784	0.5	
Team Todenhöfer					728	0.5	
Pirates					606	0.4	▼0.2
Gesundheitsforschung					562	0.4	▲0.1
NPD					378	0.2	
Humanists					347	0.2	
ÖDP	Steffen Kadow	458	0.3		327	0.2	0.0
LKR	Randy Witte	393	0.3		271	0.2	
DKP					262	0.2	0.0
du.					218	0.1	0.0
V-Partei3					127	0.1	▼0.1
BüSo					93	0.1	0.0
MLPD	Claudius Reich	149	0.1	▼0.1	85	0.1	0.0
SGP					36	0.0	0.0
Informal votes		2,509			2,818		
Total valid votes		156,239			155,930		
Turnout		158,748	76.6	0.0			
Left hold	Majority	31,239	20.0	▼1.0			

=== 2017 election ===
Federal election (2017): Berlin Treptow-Köpenick
Notes:	Blue background denotes the winner of the electorate vote. Pink background denotes a candidate elected from their party list. Yellow background denotes an electorate win by a list member, or other incumbent. A ✓ or ✗ denotes status of any incumbent, win or lose respectively.						
Party	Candidate	Votes	%	±%	Party votes	%	±%
Left	✓ Gregor Gysi	61,881	39.9	▼2.3	39,000	25.1	▼4.3
CDU	Niels Korte	29,384	18.9	▼3.7	31,372	20.2	▼5.2
AfD	Martin Trefzer	23,245	15.0	▲11.0	26,278	16.9	▲11.4
SPD	Matthias Schmidt	21,379	13.8	▼4.1	24,109	15.5	▼5.8
Greens	Erik Marquardt	7,755	5.0	0.0	12,168	7.8	▲0.5
FDP	Ralf Henze	5,831	3.8	▲2.8	10,067	6.5	▲4.5
PARTEI	Marco Koppe	3,521	2.3	▲1.4	3,873	2.5	▲1.5
Tierschutzpartei					2,283	1.5	
Die Grauen					852	0.5	
Pirates					843	0.5	▼3.0
FW	Robert Soyka	1,096	0.7	▲0.1	777	0.5	▼0.1
DiB					524	0.3	
BGE					511	0.3	
DM					511	0.3	
NPD	Udo Voigt	460	0.3	▼2.5			
Gesundheitsforschung					452	0.3	
Menschliche Welt					263	0.2	
ÖDP					260	0.2	▼0.1
V-Partei³					233	0.2	
du.					204	0.1	
DKP					193	0.1	
MLPD	Eckhard Franke	322	0.2	▲0.1	160	0.1	0.0
BüSo	Stefan Tolksdorf	318	0.2	▲0.1	146	0.1	0.0
B*					61	0.0	
SGP					48	0.0	0.0
Informal votes		1,919			1,923		
Total valid votes		155,192			155,188		
Turnout		157,111	76.6	▲3.0			
Left hold	Majority	32,497	21.0	▲1.4			

=== 2013 election ===
Federal election (2013): Berlin Treptow-Köpenick
Notes:	Blue background denotes the winner of the electorate vote. Pink background denotes a candidate elected from their party list. Yellow background denotes an electorate win by a list member, or other incumbent. A ✓ or ✗ denotes status of any incumbent, win or lose respectively.						
Party	Candidate	Votes	%	±%	Party votes	%	±%
Left	✓ Gregor Gysi	61,661	42.2	▼2.6	43,118	29.5	▼4.2
CDU	Fritz Niedergesäß	33,036	22.6	▲1.9	37,170	25.4	▲7.0
SPD	Matthias Schmidt	26,093	17.8	▼0.3	31,204	21.3	▲1.6
Greens	Harald Moritz	7,344	5.0	▼2.4	10,787	7.4	▼3.6
AfD	Bernd Erhard Stahlberg	5,788	4.0		8,106	5.5	
Pirates	Volker Georg Schröder	4,205	2.9		5,176	3.5	▲0.2
NPD	Udo Voigt	4,039	2.8	▼0.1	3,795	2.6	0.0
FDP	Volker Thiel	1,429	1.0	▼3.5	2,904	2.0	▼6.0
PARTEI	Katharina Harling	1,343	0.9		1,487	1.0	
FW	Detlef Werner Schmidt	855	0.6		894	0.6	
PRO					524	0.4	
ÖDP					328	0.2	0.0
REP					227	0.2	▼0.2
BüSo	Daniel Buchmann	218	0.1	▼0.7	199	0.1	▼0.2
MLPD	Petra Ilius	208	0.1	▼0.1	191	0.1	0.0
BIG					88	0.1	
PSG					83	0.1	0.0
Informal votes		2,187			2,125		
Total valid votes		146,219			146,281		
Turnout		148,406	73.6	▲2.3			
Left hold	Majority	28,625	19.6	▼4.5			

=== 2009 election ===
Federal election (2009): Berlin Treptow-Köpenick
Notes:	Blue background denotes the winner of the electorate vote. Pink background denotes a candidate elected from their party list. Yellow background denotes an electorate win by a list member, or other incumbent. A ✓ or ✗ denotes status of any incumbent, win or lose respectively.						
Party	Candidate	Votes	%	±%	Party votes	%	±%
Left	✓ Gregor Gysi	62,880	44.8	▲4.4	47,438	33.7	▲5.3
CDU	Niels Korte	29,124	20.7	▲4.2	25,955	18.4	▲3.2
SPD	Karl-Josef Wasserhövel	25,520	18.2	▼15.1	27,765	19.7	▼16.9
Greens	Peter Groos	10,495	7.5	▲3.4	15,486	11.0	▲2.7
FDP	Hellmut Königshaus	6,247	4.4	▲2.1	11,261	8.0	▲2.4
Pirates					4,713	3.3	
NPD	Udo Voigt	4,092	2.9	▲0.4	3,688	2.6	▲0.3
Tierschutzpartei					2,106	1.5	
BüSo	Daniel Buchmann	1,131	0.8	▼0.1	513	0.4	▲0.1
Independent	Willi Kurt Wende	625	0.4				
REP					443	0.3	▼0.1
DIE VIOLETTEN					367	0.3	
ÖDP					281	0.2	
DVU					234	0.2	
DKP					205	0.1	
MLPD	Petra Ilius	398	0.3		168	0.1	0.0
PSG					132	0.1	0.0
Informal votes		2,326			2,083		
Total valid votes		140,512			140,755		
Turnout		142,838	71.3	▼7.5			
Left hold	Majority	33,756	24.1	▲16.9			

=== 2005 election ===
Federal election (2005):Berlin-Treptow – Köpenick
Notes:	Blue background denotes the winner of the electorate vote. Pink background denotes a candidate elected from their party list. Yellow background denotes an electorate win by a list member, or other incumbent. A ✓ or ✗ denotes status of any incumbent, win or lose respectively.						
Party	Candidate	Votes	%	±%	Party votes	%	±%
Left	Gregor Gysi	60,470	40.4	▲10.2	42,675	28.4	▲5.0
SPD	✗ Siegfried Scheffler	49,807	33.2	▼6.1	54,938	36.6	▼4.6
CDU	Niels Korte	24,823	16.6	▼1.6	22,791	15.2	▼2.3
Greens	Tobias Schulze	6,051	4.0	▼1.0	12,468	8.3	▲0.7
NPD	Udo Voigt	3,788	2.5	▲0.8	3,549	2.4	▲1.3
FDP	Hellmut Königshaus	3,532	2.4	▼1.8	8,448	5.6	▲0.9
GRAUEN					2,136	1.4	▲0.6
BüSo	Helma Aßmann	1,333	0.9		395	0.3	▲0.2
Feminist					831	0.6	0.0
REP					661	0.4	▼0.2
PARTEI					579	0.4	
APPD					208	0.1	
SGP					179	0.1	
MLPD					150	0.1	
Informal votes		2,498			2,294		
Total valid votes		149,804			150,008		
Turnout		152,302	78.6	▲0.7			
Left gain from SPD	Majority	10,663	7.2				
