= Anna Peters (politician) =

German politician

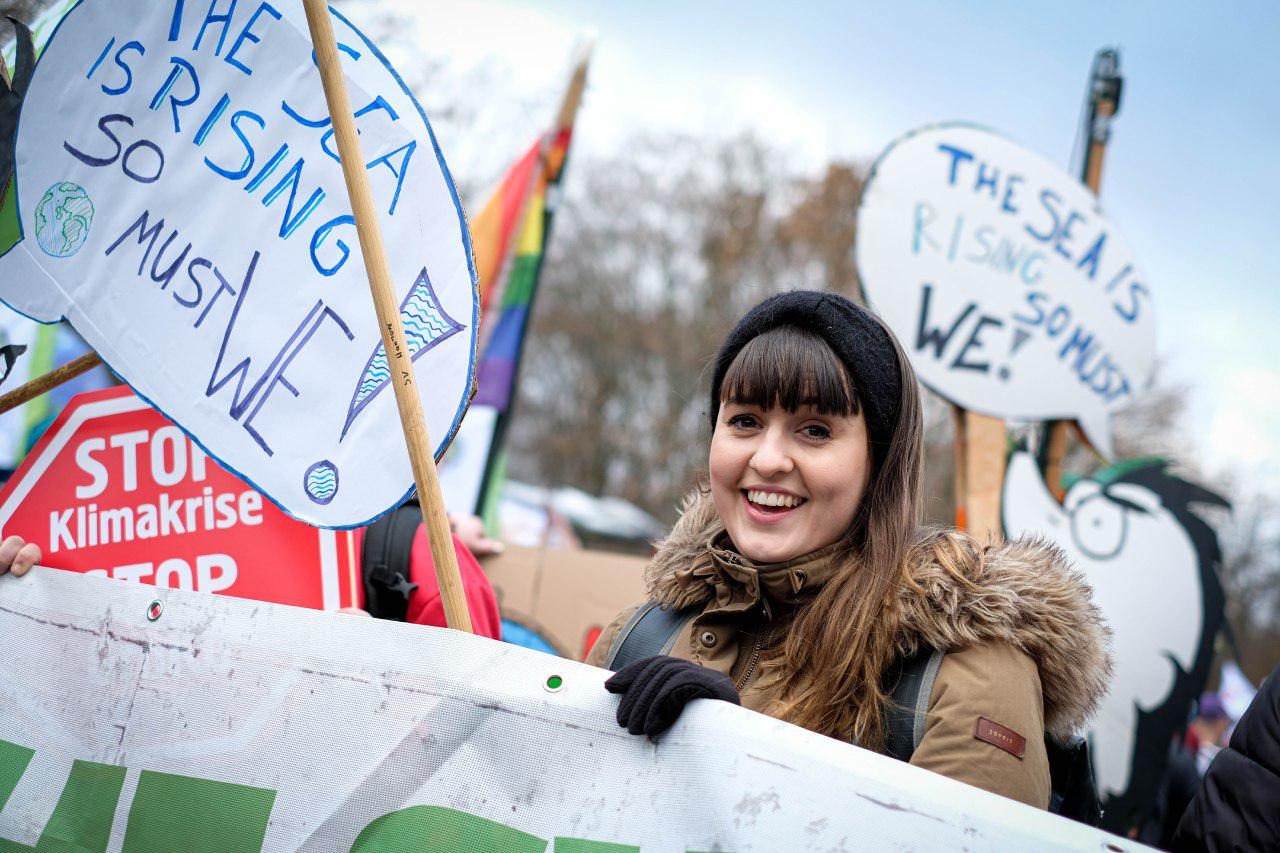
- Peters in 2019

Speaker of the Federal Grüne Jugend
- In office October 2019 – October 2021 Serving with Georg Kurz
- Preceded by: Ricarda Lang and Max Lucks
- Succeeded by: Timon Dzienus and Sarah-Lee Heinrich

Anna Peters is a German politician of The Greens and number 13 on her party's election list for the 2024-2029 European Parliament. She is running on a feminist finance platform. In November 2023 when the list was announced, the Greens polled at 15 seats.

From 2019 to 2021, Anna Peters served as federal speaker of the Grüne Jugend, her party's youth organisation, jointly with Georg Kurz.

== Early life ==
Anna Peters is from Emmendingen near the French border in Baden-Württemberg, and joined the anti-nuclear movement when she was thirteen. She went to the French-German School Freiburg, serving as student council treasurer, and spent one exchange year at a school in Ohio, USA.

== Political career ==
Peters joined the Grüne Jugend at age 16, motivated by opposition to the nearby Fessenheim nuclear power plant.

In 2017, Peters was part of the COP23 delegation of the Federation of Young European Greens. In 2018, she became International Secretary of the Grüne Jugend federal board. In 2019, Peters became one of the two federal speakers (Bundessprecherin) of the Grüne Jugend, thus jointly presiding the board. After her spell at the Grüne Jugend board, she obtained a master's degree in economics and founded a registered association for feminist fiscal policy.

In 2023, Peters was women's policy spokesperson of A90/Greens Baden-Württemberg.

== Positions ==
Speaking about the 2021 manifesto of her party, Peters criticised that it emphasised growth too much, favouring instead an economy centred on human needs. She also asked for independent oversight for the police and a halt to all autobahn construction. She positioned herself against a possible coalition with the centre-right Christian Democrats, a view she reiterated regarding the existing coalition in her home state of Baden-Württemberg.

On the environment, Peters stated that climate protection must be socially equitable.
