= Pantisano =

Pantisano is a surname of Italian origin.

== People with the surname ==
- Alfonso Pantisano (born 1975), German activist
- Luigi Pantisano (born 1979), German politician

== See also ==
- Pantano
