= Anna Peters =

Anna Peters may refer to:

- Anna Peters (painter)
- Anna Peters (politician)
- Anna Louise Peters, of the American vocal trio Peters Sisters
