= Pantano =

Pantano may refer to:

- Pantano (surname)
- Pantano, Arizona, a ghost town in Pima County, Arizona, United States
- Pântano River, a river of Brazil

== See also ==
- El Pantano, a corregimiento in Santa Fé District, Veraguas Province, Panama
- Pantisano, surname
