= Green Youth (Germany) =

Youth organisation linked to Bündnis 90/Die Grünen

Green Youth Grüne Jugend
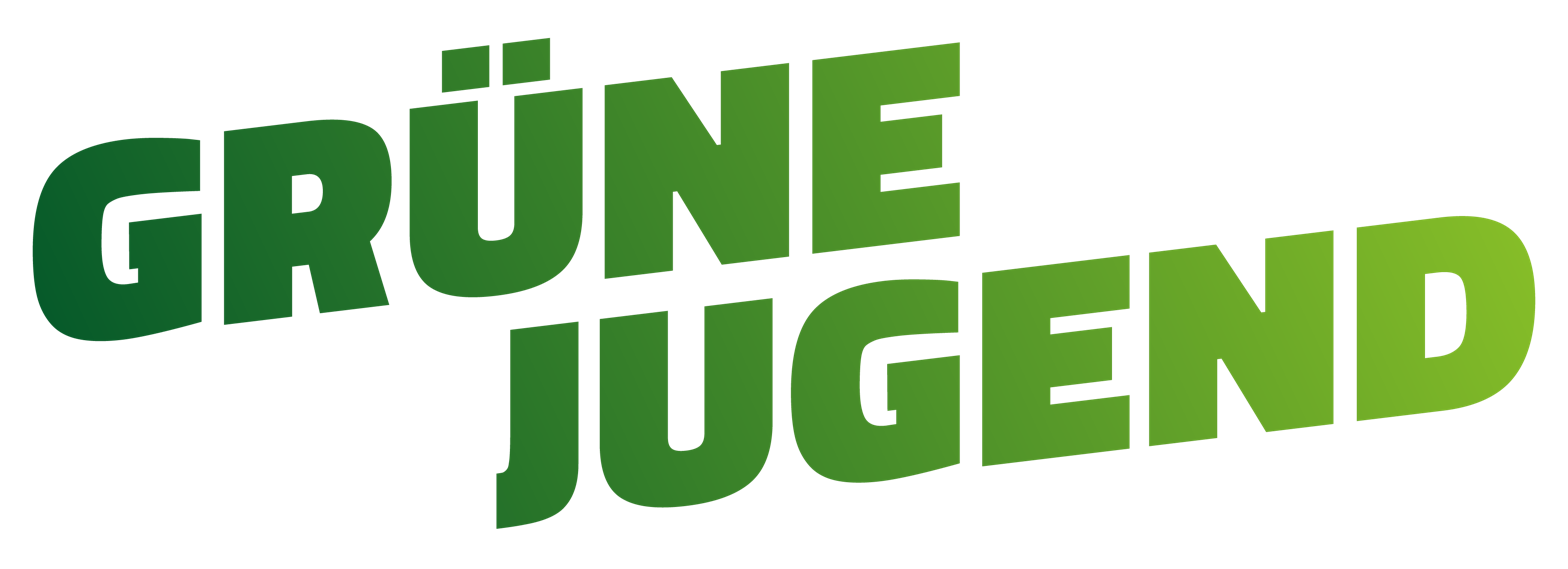
- Logo
- Spokesperson: Henriette Held and Luis Bobga (since October 2025)
- Founded: 1994
- Ideology: Green politics
- Mother party: Alliance 90/The Greens
- International affiliation: Global Young Greens
- European affiliation: Federation of Young European Greens (FYEG)
- Website: gruene-jugend.de

Green Youth (German: Grüne Jugend, GJ) is the youth organisation linked to the Alliance 90/The Greens (German: Bündnis 90/Die Grünen or Grüne) political party in Germany.

== History ==
Green Youth was founded on 16 January 1994, as an independent association with the name Grün-Alternatives Jugendbündnis (abbreviated: GAJB).

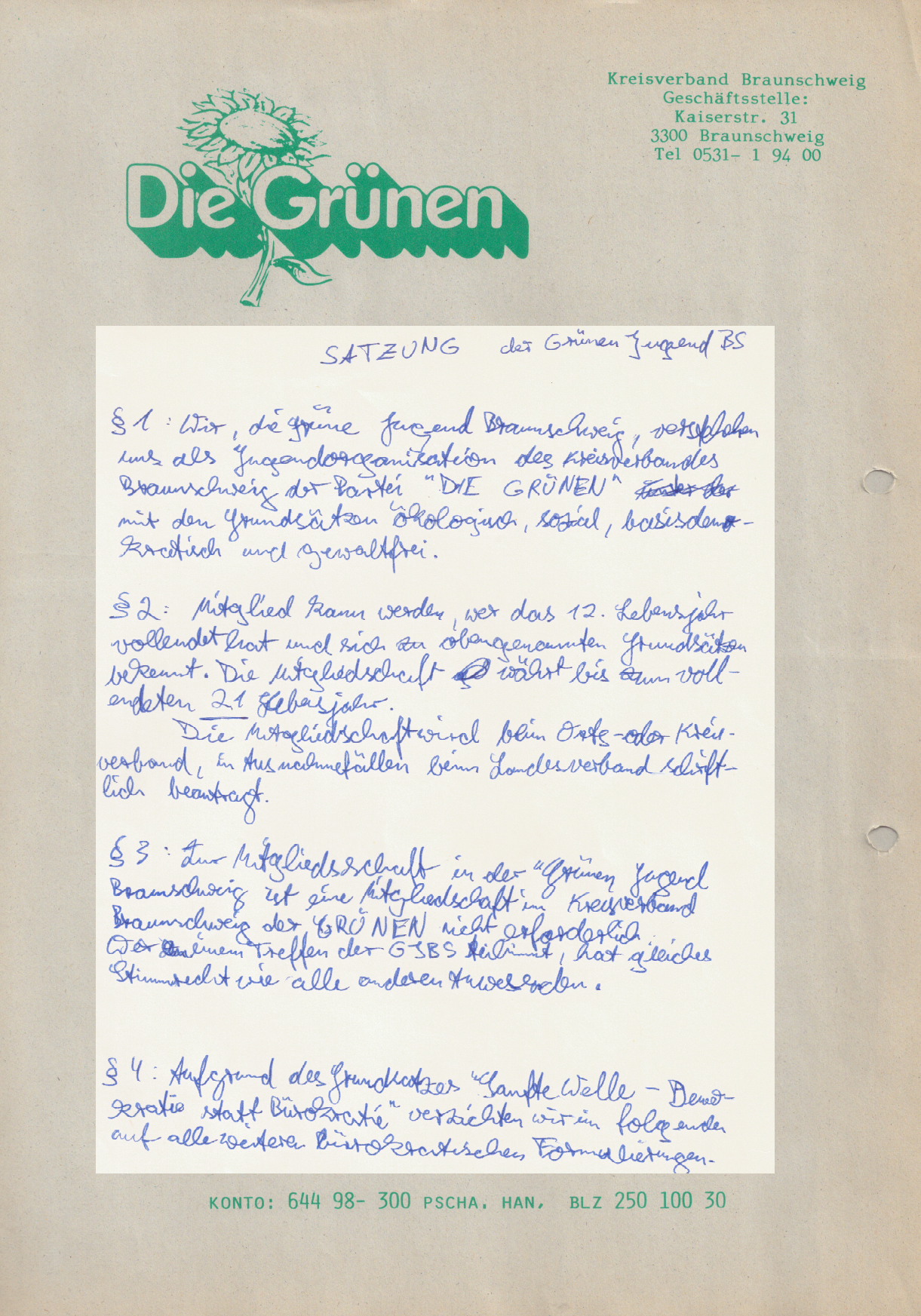
Original statutes of the first Grüne Jugend from 1981

Before 1994 there were, after the first attempts in Niedersachsen like Grüne Jugend Braunschweig, founded in the spring of 1981, several state-based associations, such as the Grüne Jugend Hessen, which had been founded in the spring of 1991. It used and still uses a frog as its logo. In the same spring the Grün-Alternative Jugend Baden-Württemberg was founded. Parallel to these state-based organisations was the federal Bundesjugendkontaktstelle (Abbreviated: BUJUKS), a loose network of young members and sympathisers of Die Grünen.

After several years of debate, a federal green youth organisation was founded, in which the state-based organisations and the BUJUKS all merged. In 2001, Green Youth became an integral part of the Die Grünen and lost its independent status.

In 2024 the spokespeople and the entire federal board of ten people stepped down and resigned their Alliance 90/The Greens memberships, citing a plan to create a new left-wing youth organization, citing a rightward shift of the party on foreign, economic and environmental policy as their reason.

== Ideology ==
Although it has similar positions to its mother party, there are some differences. Green Youth for instance is in favour of legalisation of all drugs and the use of free software.

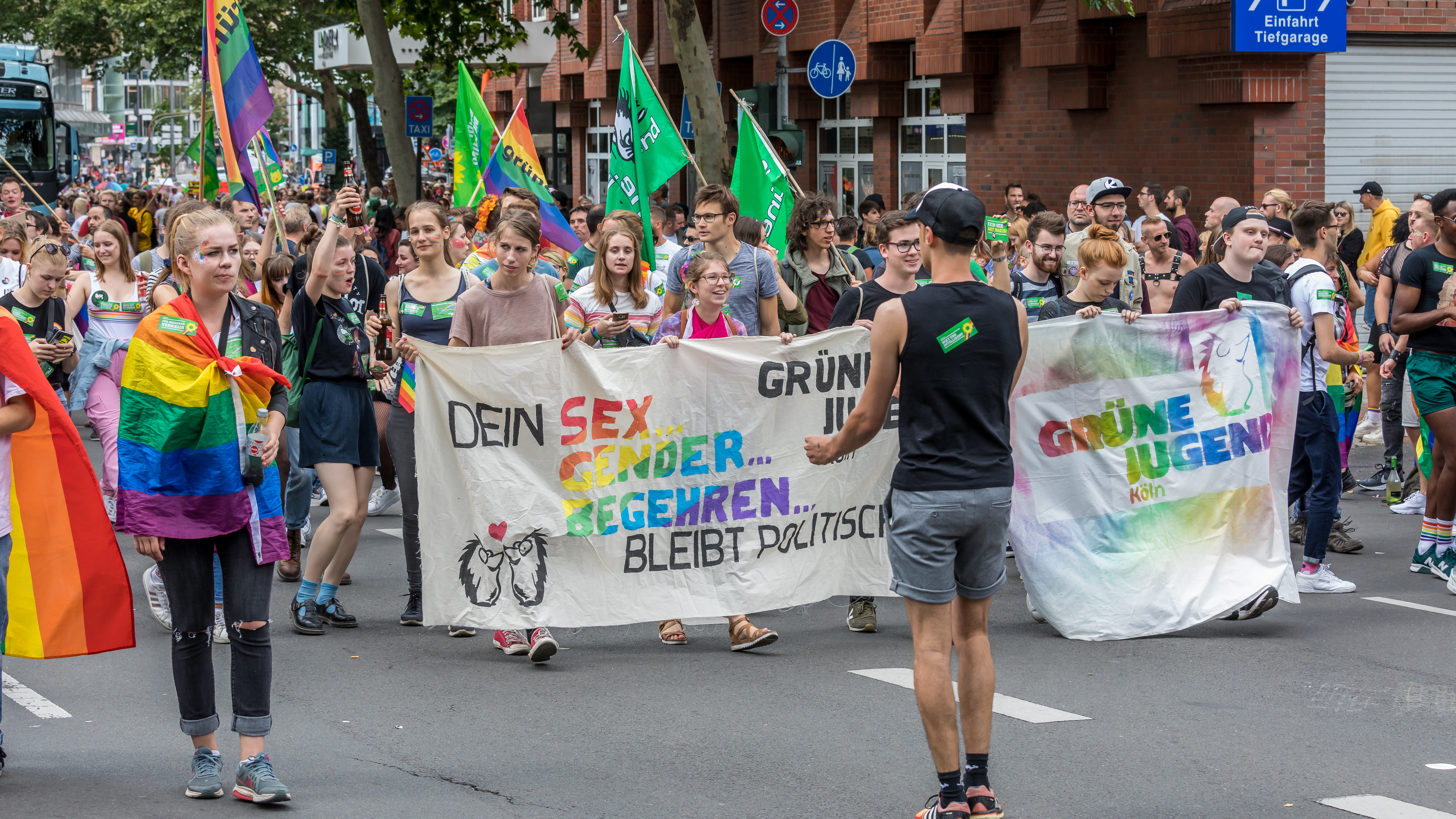
Green Youth at Cologne Pride 2019

== Organization ==
Green Youth is a Basisgruppe within Alliance 90/The Greens. It has about 15,000 members. Some of these are members of state-based organisations, while others are direct members of the federal organisation. Membership of the youth organisation currently represents about 15% of the membership of the main party. Membership of the organisation ends in the year one becomes 28-years-old.

The highest organ of the party is the federal congress, in which all members can participate and vote. It elects the board with two speakers, the editors of the party-magazine, SPUNK and the board of arbitration. There is a strict rule that the board, the two speakers and all other elected groups at any level must consist of at least 50% women, inter or trans persons, same as in the mother party. This is to ensure equal treatment. In the months that the federal congress does not meet a federal council, consisting out of two members per state-based organisations, meets. There are also several thematic fora, which work on specific themes (e.g. Europe, Democracy, Drugs, Equal treatment).

Green Youth is a member of the Federation of Young European Greens and Global Young Greens.

=== Leaders ===
Joint spokespersons over time
Period	Spokesperson 1	Spokesperson 2
2017–2019	Ricarda Lang	Max Lucks
2019–2021	Anna Peters	Georg Kurz
2021–2023	Sarah-Lee Heinrich	Timon Dzienus
2023–2024	Svenja Appuhn	Katharina Stolla
2024–2025	Jette Nietzard	Jakob Blasel
2025-present	Henriette Held	Luis Bobga
