= Berlin-Lichtenberg (electoral district) =

Federal electoral district of Germany

85 Berlin-Lichtenberg
- Electoral district for the Bundestag
- Berlin-Lichtenberg in 2025
- State: Berlin
- Population: 290,100 (2019)
- Electorate: 200,673 (2021)
- Area: 52.1 km^{2}

Current electoral district
- Created: 2002
- Party: LINKE
- Member: Ines Schwerdtner
- Elected: 2025

Berlin-Lichtenberg is an electoral constituency (German: Wahlkreis) represented in the Bundestag. It elects one member via first-past-the-post voting. Under the current constituency numbering system, it is designated as constituency 85. It is located in eastern Berlin, comprising the Lichtenberg borough.

Berlin-Lichtenberg was created for the 2002 federal election. Since 2025, it has been represented by Ines Schwerdtner of The Left.

== Geography ==
Berlin-Lichtenberg is located in eastern Berlin. As of the 2021 federal election, it is coterminous with the Lichtenberg borough.

== History ==
Berlin-Lichtenberg was created in 2002 and contained parts of the abolished constituencies of Berlin Hohenschönhausen – Pankow – Weissensee and Friedrichshain – Lichtenberg. In the 2002 through 2009 elections, it was constituency 87 in the numbering system. In the 2013 through 2021 elections, it was number 86. From the 2025 election, it has been number 85. Its borders have not changed since its creation.

== Members ==
The constituency was represented by Gesine Lötzsch of The Left from its creation in 1994 until her retirement ahead of the 2025 election. Prior to the formation of The Left in 2005, she represented it as a member of the Party of Democratic Socialism (PDS). She was succeeded by Ines Schwerdtner, who retained the seat for The Left.

Election	Member	Party	%
1994	Christa Luft	PDS	44.4
1998	Christa Luft	PDS	42.2
2002	Gesine Lötzsch	PDS	39.6
2005	Gesine Lötzsch	LINKE	42.9
2009	Gesine Lötzsch	LINKE	47.5
2013	Gesine Lötzsch	LINKE	40.3
2017	Gesine Lötzsch	LINKE	34.7
2021	Gesine Lötzsch	LINKE	25.8
2025	Ines Schwerdtner	LINKE	34.0

== Election results ==
=== 2025 election ===
Federal election (2025): Berlin-Lichtenberg
Notes:	Blue background denotes the winner of the electorate vote. Pink background denotes a candidate elected from their party list. Yellow background denotes an electorate win by a list member, or other incumbent. A ✓ or ✗ denotes status of any incumbent, win or lose respectively.						
Party	Candidate	Votes	%	±%	Party votes	%	±%
Left	Ines Schwerdtner	52,378	34.0	▲8.2	36,204	23.5	▲5.2
AfD	Beatrix von Storch	33,707	21.9	▲9.5	34,635	22.4	▲9.8
CDU	Danny Freymark	27,190	17.6	▲5.1	21,230	13.8	▲1.8
SPD	Jan Zimmerling	13,926	9.0	▼10.4	18,331	11.9	▼11.1
Greens	Elisabeth Giesemann	8,108	5.3	▼8.3	16,699	10.8	▼4.6
BSW	Norman Wolf	11,527	7.5	New	15,613	10.1	New
FDP	Sören Henschel	2,231	1.4	▼4.6	3,877	2.5	▼4.4
Tierschutzpartei	Florian Schmeding	3,576	2.3	▼1.8	3,100	2.0	▼1.4
Volt					1,546	1.0	▲0.3
PARTEI					1,243	0.8	▼1.3
FW	Tobias Gill	851	0.6	▼1.2	595	0.4	▼0.9
PdF					389	0.3	New
BD	Holger Wilske	516	0.3	New	289	0.2	New
Team Todenhöfer					221	0.1	▼0.3
MERA25					139	0.1	New
MLPD					100	0.1	0.0
BüSo	Jonathan Thron	150	0.1	New	83	0.1	0.0
SGP					39	0.0	0.0
Informal votes		1,237			1,064		
Total valid votes		154,160			154,333		
Turnout		155,397	79.0	▲7.2			
Left hold	Majority	18,671	12.1	▲5.9			

=== 2021 election ===
Federal election (2021): Berlin-Lichtenberg
Notes:	Blue background denotes the winner of the electorate vote. Pink background denotes a candidate elected from their party list. Yellow background denotes an electorate win by a list member, or other incumbent. A ✓ or ✗ denotes status of any incumbent, win or lose respectively.						
Party	Candidate	Votes	%	±%	Party votes	%	±%
Left	✓ Gesine Lötzsch	36,813	25.8	▼9.1	26,063	18.2	▼11.1
SPD	Anja Ingenbleek	28,040	19.6	▲5.5	33,174	23.2	▲8.4
Greens	Laura Dornheim	19,485	13.6	▲7.8	22,112	15.5	▲8.8
CDU	Wilfried Nünthel	17,695	12.4	▼7.3	16,869	11.8	▼6.7
AfD	Dietmar Drewes	17,356	12.2	▼3.6	17,840	12.5	▼4.2
FDP	Lina Thiel	8,682	6.1	▲2.7	10,045	7.0	▲1.8
Tierschutzpartei	Katja Michel	5,876	4.1		4,886	3.4	▲1.6
PARTEI	Nora Röhner	3,865	2.7	▼0.3	2,937	2.1	▼0.4
Die Grauen					2,156	1.5	▲0.9
FW	Tobias Bauer	2,491	1.7		1,890	1.3	▲1.0
dieBasis	Ulrich Klieboldt	1,821	1.3				
Volt					941	0.7	
Gesundheitsforschung					729	0.5	▼0.3
Pirates					716	0.5	▼0.1
Team Todenhöfer					638	0.4	
DKP					354	0.2	▲0.1
Humanists					339	0.2	
NPD					298	0.2	
du.					216	0.1	0.0
ÖDP	Lisa Stemmer	285	0.2		215	0.2	0.0
LKR	Matthias Bruse	195	0.1		119	0.1	
MLPD	Dagmar Arnecke	193	0.1	▼0.1	104	0.1	▼0.1
V-Partei3					96	0.1	▼0.1
BüSo					78	0.1	0.0
SGP					49	0.0	0.0
Informal votes		2,772			2,706		
Total valid votes		142,797			142,863		
Turnout		145,569	72.5	▼0.1			
Left hold	Majority	8,773	6.2	▼8.9			

=== 2017 election ===
Federal election (2017): Berlin-Lichtenberg
Notes:	Blue background denotes the winner of the electorate vote. Pink background denotes a candidate elected from their party list. Yellow background denotes an electorate win by a list member, or other incumbent. A ✓ or ✗ denotes status of any incumbent, win or lose respectively.						
Party	Candidate	Votes	%	±%	Party votes	%	±%
Left	✓ Gesine Lötzsch	51,249	34.8	▼5.5	43,172	29.3	▼5.2
CDU	Martin Pätzold	28,905	19.7	▼3.1	27,284	18.5	▼4.5
AfD	Marius Radtke	23,119	15.7	▲11.4	24,603	16.7	▲11.2
SPD	Kevin Hönicke	20,720	14.1	▼5.5	21,850	14.9	▼5.6
Greens	Hannah Neumann	8,609	5.9	▲1.6	9,821	6.7	▲0.8
FDP	Dirk Gawlitza	5,018	3.4	▲2.7	7,745	5.3	▲3.7
PARTEI	Stefan Sacharjew	4,392	3.0		3,627	2.5	▲1.5
Tierschutzpartei					2,609	1.8	
Gesundheitsforschung	Felix Werth	1,537	1.0		1,189	0.8	
Independent	Oliver Snelinski	1,394	0.9				
Pirates	Olaf Lengner	1,314	0.9	▼2.7	958	0.7	▼3.1
Die Grauen					913	0.6	
NPD	Manuela Tönhardt	533	0.4	▼2.5			
DiB					524	0.4	
FW					524	0.4	
BGE					486	0.3	
DM					349	0.2	
DKP					282	0.2	
Menschliche Welt					235	0.2	
du.					215	0.1	
ÖDP					194	0.1	▼0.1
V-Partei³					194	0.1	
MLPD	Dagmar Arnecke	282	0.2		181	0.1	0.0
BüSo					62	0.0	▼0.1
SGP					36	0.0	▼0.1
B*					73	0.0	
Informal votes		2,044			1,990		
Total valid votes		147,072			147,126		
Turnout		149,116	72.6	▲5.2			
Left hold	Majority	22,344	15.1	▼2.5			

=== 2013 election ===
Federal election (2013): Berlin-Lichtenberg
Notes:	Blue background denotes the winner of the electorate vote. Pink background denotes a candidate elected from their party list. Yellow background denotes an electorate win by a list member, or other incumbent. A ✓ or ✗ denotes status of any incumbent, win or lose respectively.						
Party	Candidate	Votes	%	±%	Party votes	%	±%
Left	✓ Gesine Lötzsch	54,932	40.3	▼7.1	47,158	34.6	▼6.6
CDU	Martin Pätzold	30,988	22.7	▲5.4	31,491	23.1	▲6.8
SPD	Erik Gührs	26,636	19.5	▲1.1	27,886	20.4	▲3.1
AfD	Christian Jacken	5,827	4.3		7,480	5.5	
Greens	Bartosz Lotarewicz	5,748	4.2	▼3.2	7,956	5.8	▼3.0
Pirates	Denis Sabin	4,917	3.6		5,072	3.7	▼0.1
NPD	Manuela Tönhardt	3,858	2.8	▼0.6	3,486	2.6	▼0.2
PARTEI					1,379	1.0	
Independent	Oliver Snelinski	1,219	0.9				
FW		997	0.7		771	0.6	
FDP	Holger Schwabe	939	0.7	▼3.2	2,117	1.6	▼5.1
PRO					595	0.4	
ÖDP					265	0.2	0.0
REP					220	0.2	▼0.2
BüSo		231	0.2	▼0.9	172	0.1	▼0.3
MLPD					163	0.1	0.0
PSG					117	0.1	0.0
BIG					73	0.1	
Informal votes		2,259			2,150		
Total valid votes		136,292			136,401		
Turnout		138,551	67.4	▲2.6			
Left hold	Majority	23,944	17.6	▼11.5			

=== 2009 election ===
Federal election (2009): Berlin-Lichtenberg
Notes:	Blue background denotes the winner of the electorate vote. Pink background denotes a candidate elected from their party list. Yellow background denotes an electorate win by a list member, or other incumbent. A ✓ or ✗ denotes status of any incumbent, win or lose respectively.						
Party	Candidate	Votes	%	±%	Party votes	%	±%
Left	✓ Gesine Lötzsch	61,874	47.4	▲4.6	53,815	41.2	▲5.6
SPD	Andreas Geisel	24,028	18.4	▼13.7	22,618	17.3	▼17.1
CDU	Edeltraut Töpfer	22,566	17.3	▲3.6	21,347	16.3	▲3.7
Greens	Franziska Eichstädt-Bohlig	9,652	7.4	▲3.0	11,490	8.8	▲2.4
FDP	Hanaa El-Hussein	5,048	3.9	▲1.1	8,666	6.6	▲1.9
Pirates					4,972	3.8	
NPD	Manuela Tönhardt	4,492	3.4	▲0.2	3,603	2.8	0.0
Tierschutzpartei					1,960	1.5	
Independent	Oliver Snelinski	1,439	1.1				
BüSo	Wolfgang Lillge	1,384	1.1	▲0.1	513	0.4	▲0.1
REP					453	0.3	▼0.1
DKP					286	0.2	
DVU					273	0.2	
DIE VIOLETTEN					272	0.2	
ÖDP					225	0.2	
PSG					158	0.1	0.0
MLPD					101	0.1	0.0
Informal votes		2,283			2,014		
Total valid votes		130,483			130,752		
Turnout		132,766	64.8	▼9.4			
Left hold	Majority	37,846	19.0	▲8.2			

=== 2005 election ===
Federal election (2005):Berlin-Lichtenberg
Notes:	Blue background denotes the winner of the electorate vote. Pink background denotes a candidate elected from their party list. Yellow background denotes an electorate win by a list member, or other incumbent. A ✓ or ✗ denotes status of any incumbent, win or lose respectively.						
Party	Candidate	Votes	%	±%	Party votes	%	±%
Left	✓ Gesine Lötzsch	62,824	42.9	▲3.2	52,217	35.5	▲6.2
SPD	Andreas Köhler	47,112	32.1	▼0.4	50,555	34.4	▼4.3
CDU	Roland Gewalt	20,138	13.7	▼3.2	18,548	12.6	▼3.5
Greens	Claudia Hämmerling	6,373	4.3	▲0.3	9,345	6.4	▲1.0
NPD	Claus Schade	4,682	3.2	▲0.6	4,042	2.8	▲1.3
FDP	Holger Schwabe	4,002	2.7	▼1.0	6,909	4.7	▲0.5
GRAUEN					2,251	1.5	▲0.9
BüSo	Jörg Petig	1,434	1.0		415	0.3	▲0.2
Feminist					921	0.6	0.0
REP					631	0.4	▼0.2
PARTEI					596	0.4	
APPD					193	0.1	
SGP					186	0.1	
MLPD					131	0.1	
Informal votes		2,533			2,158		
Total valid votes		146,565			146,940		
Turnout		149,098	74.2	▲1.0			
Left hold	Majority	15,712	10.8				
