= Queer Berlin Liaison Officer =

Queer Berlin Liaison Officer of Senate of Berlin
- Ansprechperson Queeres Berlin für die Akzeptanz sexueller und geschlechtlicher Vielfalt
- Incumbent; Alfonso Pantisano (SPD)
- Formation: 2023
- First holder: Alfonso Pantisano

The Queer Berlin Liaison Officer (German: Queerbeauftragte Person) is a post in the government of the city of Berlin (Berlin Senate) created in May 2023 by the grand coalition government of the Christian Democrats (CDU) and Social Democrats (SPD).

The Liaison Officer serves as a mouthpiece for concerns of the queer communities of Berlin, and as a contact person for queer representatives in the administrations of the city's twelve boroughs. The office is responsible for representation at the state and national level, and for public relations. The queer commissioner is also in close exchange with the Federal Queer Commissioner (Sven Lehmann in the 2021–2025 legislative period). The Officer's tasks include holding a regular roundtable with the queer communities, the establishment of a citywide roundtable on anti-queer violence, the "Rainbow House" community centre, and establishing 14 May as Magnus Hirschfeld Day.

== Alfonso Pantisano (2023-2026) ==
The inaugural Queer Liaison Officer, Alfonso Pantisano took office in July 2023, named by the government in charge of Berlin until the 2026 Berlin state election. He is a long-time queer activist who previously chaired the Berlin SPD's committee on equality and inclusion, SPDqueer. He previously co-founded a queer rights organisation called Enough is Enough.

In his inaugural speech at Berlin Pride 2023, Pantisano supported the inclusion in the German constitution (Art. 3) of protection for gender and sexual minorities, and a self-ID law for transgender people, both projects of the 2021-2025 federal government. He also rallied for legal motherhood status for lesbian parents. Pantisano stated that Berliners suffer two queerphobic attacks per day on average, vowing to make the city safer for queer people, for example when holding hands in public.

He also touched on intra-community affairs. He asked the queer community to avoid stereotyping religious people, and Turkish, Arab or other immigrant minorities as queer-phobic, highlighting the discrimination produced by ethnic Germans. Likewise, he said that queer men like him take too much space in the queer community, and promised to fight better for lesbian, bisexual, transgender, asexual, intersex, nonbinary and Black people.

Outside of his capacity as Queer Liaison Officer, Pantisano defended the raising of the rainbow flag by Berlin's Police headquarters against the right-wing tabloid journalist Julian Reichelt, suing Reichelt and others for incitement of hatred (Volksverhetzung).
