= Sarah-Lee Heinrich =

German politician (born 2001)

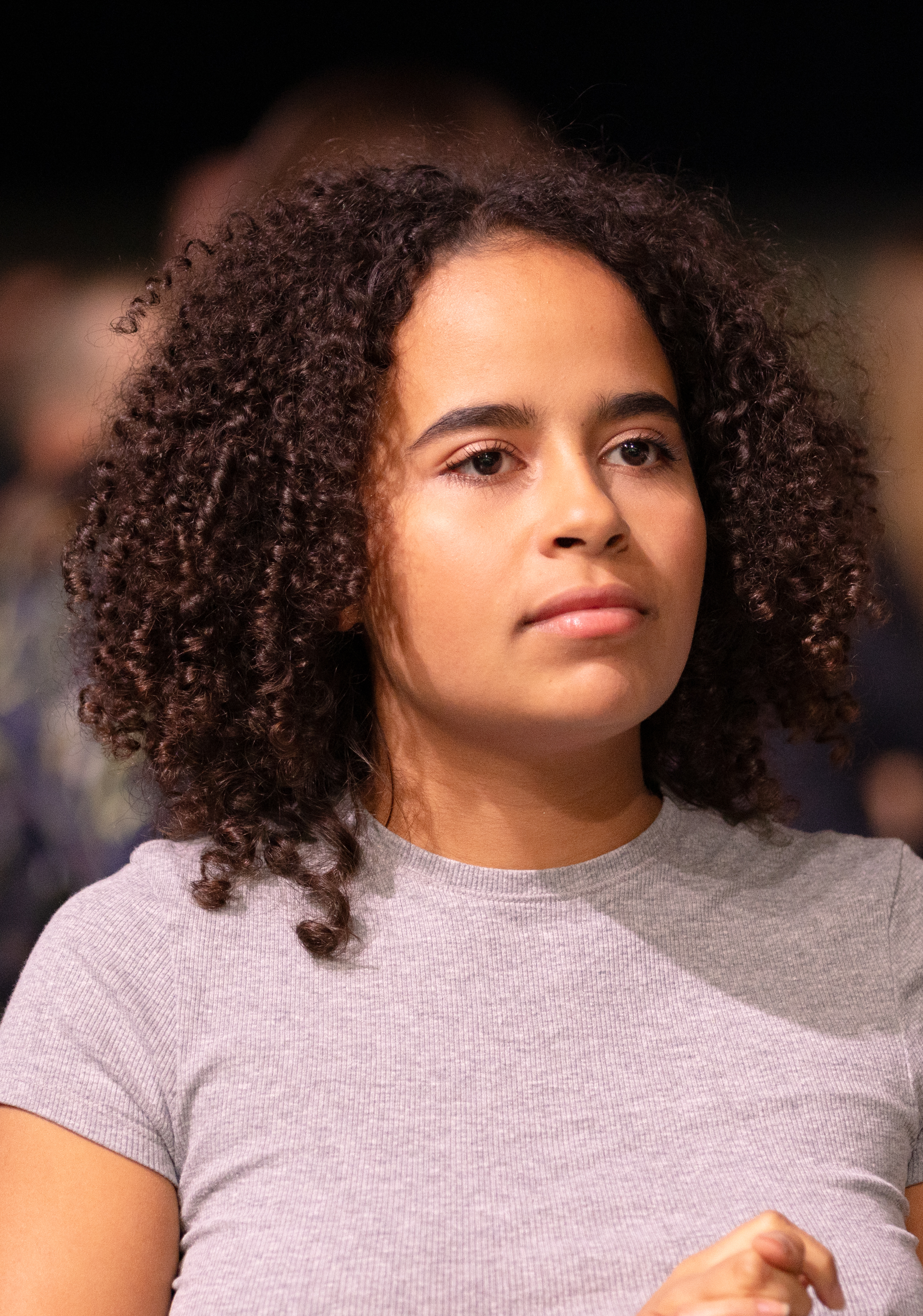
Sarah-Lee Heinrich in 2023

Sarah-Lee Heinrich (born 22 March 2001, Iserlohn, Germany) is a German non-party politician after leaving the German Green Party in September 2024. She was a federal speaker for the Grüne Jugend from October 2021 to October 2023.

== Early life and education ==
Heinrich grew up in poverty, being brought up by a single mother on welfare (Hartz IV).

Heinrich completed her abitur at the Pestalozzi-Gymnasium in Unna in 2019, and studied politics, sociology and philosophy from 2019 to 2020 at the University of Bonn before studying Social Sciences from 2020 at the University of Cologne.

== Political career ==
In 2017, she joined the youth organization Grünen Jugend and founded a local chapter in Unna. She was speaker of this local chapter from 2017 to 2019. In 2019, she was speaker of Grünen Jugend Ruhr. She first gained media attention for criticizing Hartz IV in 2018 when she complained in a tweet that she didn't have enough money to move out for college, and Hartz IV wouldn't even allow her to earn additional money without reducing benefits.

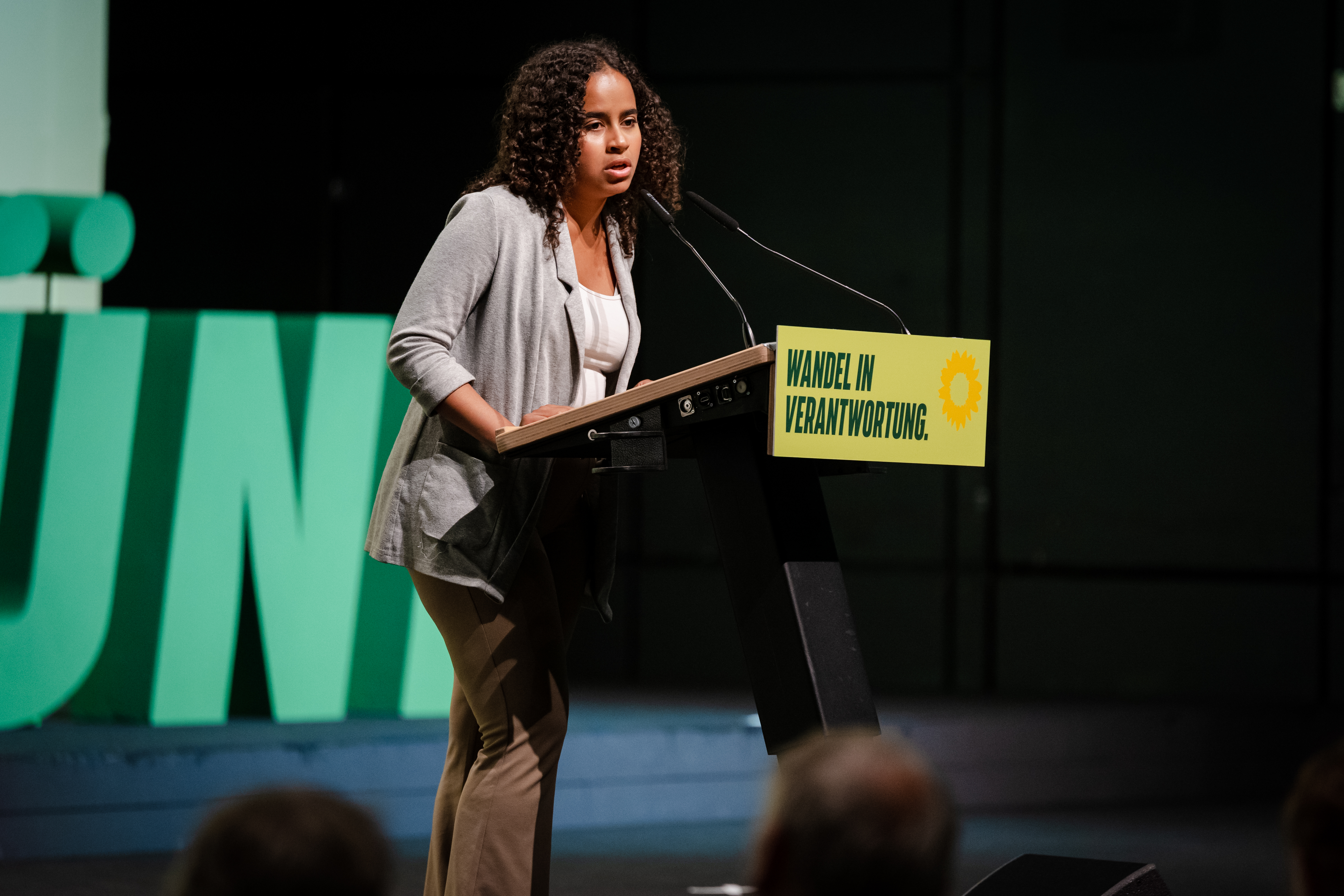
Heinrich at a conference of the Green Party in 2022

At 9 October 2021, she was elected with 93.8% of the votes as one of the two federal speakers of the Grüne Jugend. After her election, tweets she wrote at the age of 13 and 14 and deleted since then were discussed publicly, after right-wing social media accounts and the tabloid newspaper Bild reported about them initially. Heinrich apologized for those Tweets and called them "wrong and hurtful". Due to vehement attacks like death threats, she temporarily withdrew from the public for a few days.

Heinrich left the Green party in September 2024 after a fall out with the party line. She reappeared as a speaker at The Left party congress in October 2024, announcing a new youth organisation.

== Political positions and activism ==
Heinrich advocates for social justice. She criticizes the welfare system Hartz IV where she demands higher benefits and opposes benefit sanctions.

She is committed to anti-racism with an emphasis on corporate exploitation of e.g. immigrants. Heinrich also campaigns for climate change mitigation where she aims for systemic changes. She is active in the trade union ver.di. she was involved in joint campaigns of Ver.di and Fridays For Future during her time as spokesperson for the Green Youth.

In an interview with Tilo Jung, Heinrich said her political views were inspired by Bernie Sanders and his approach to unite working class interests with anti-racism and climate change mitigation in his 2016 presidential campaign. Heinrich was active as a teamer in the Protestant church in her youth. She is an atheist by her own account

== Memberships ==
In addition to her former affiliation with the Green Party and the Green Youth, Heinrich is, by her own account, also a member of the Ver.di trade union, the youth organization of the EVG trade union, Die Falken (Socialist Youth of Germany), and a member of the board of the Institut Solidarische Moderne.

== Awards and publications ==
- 2021: Edition F (Feminist Magazine) Award in the Politics category.
- She published the book "GENUG!"(ENOUGH!) in 2023 together with Ines Schwerdtner, Lukas Scholle, Şeyda Kurt, Andrej Holm and Maurice Höfgen, which calls for a change of political course. In it, Heinrich writes about the systematics of poverty in Germany.
