= Jan van Aken =

German politician and biologist (born 1961)

Jan van Aken MdB
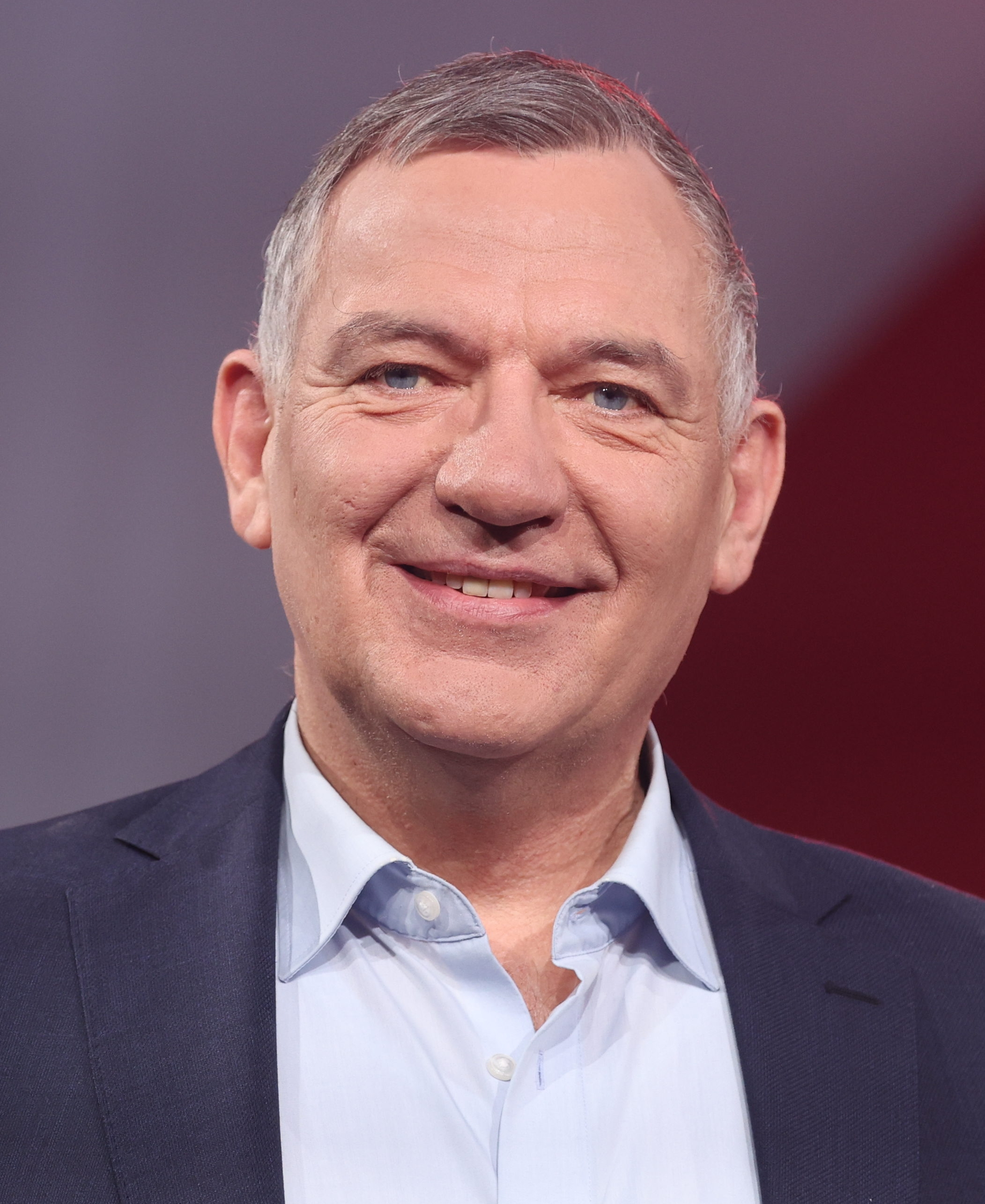
- Van Aken in 2025

Leader of The Left
- In office 19 October 2024 – 20 June 2026 Serving with Ines Schwerdtner
- Preceded by: Janine Wissler
- Succeeded by: Luigi Pantisano

Member of the Bundestag for Hamburg
- Incumbent
- Assumed office 25 March 2025
- Constituency: The Left Party List
- In office 27 October 2009 – 24 October 2017
- Constituency: The Left Party List

Personal details
- Born: 1 May 1961 (age 65) Reinbek, Schleswig-Holstein, West Germany
- Party: The Left (since 2007)
- Children: 3
- Education: University of Hamburg (Dip, PhD)
- Occupation: Biologist • Politician

Jan Paul van Aken (born 1 May 1961) is a German biologist and politician. He has been co-leader of The Left since October 2024 and a member of the German Bundestag since 2025, a position he held previously from 2009 to 2017.

He is a member of the Foreign Affairs Committee and the Subcommittee on Disarmament, Arms Control and Non-Proliferation in the German Bundestag. Van Aken entered the 17th Bundestag in 2009 after he was listed on the Left electoral lists in Hamburg. From 2009 to 2011, van Aken was the deputy chairperson for the parliamentary faction of the Left.

== Biography ==
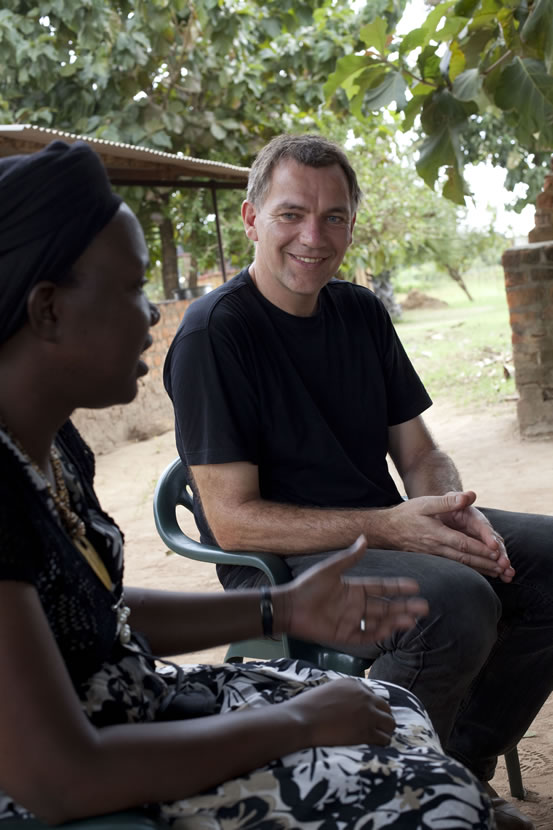
Jan van Aken speaking with Milcah Lalam, the leader of the Sudanese NGO RECONCILE Peace Institute in 2010

After completing his Abitur in 1982, van Aken studied biology at the University of Hamburg. After completing his Diplom in biology in 1989 he got a PhD in 1993. He worked as a scientist at the University of Hamburg. From 1997 to 2009 he was the resident expert on genetic engineering for the environmental organization Greenpeace. Also during this time, from 2004 until 2006, he worked as a biological weapons inspector for the United Nations. His long-standing interest in biological warfare agents had already led him in 1999 to call for their banning as part of the Sunshine Project, which was followed by the establishment of a research institute with similar objectives in 2003. After his return to Hamburg as part of his work with the UN, he joined the Left Party and became, only three years later, the lead candidate of the party in Hamburg during the 2009 German federal election.

Van Aken was ordered in April 2013 by the Lüneburg District Court to pay a fine of €2,250 for a "public provocation to commit a crime" because he signed the "Castor, schottern" petition calling for the sabotage of railroads in protest against the transport of nuclear waste.

From 2009 to 2011, van Aken was the deputy chairperson for the parliamentary faction of the Left Party in the Bundestag, and since 2012, he has been their foreign policy spokesperson. He has since stepped down in 2017.

Since quitting his role as MoP, van Aken has been working at the Geneva office of the Rosa Luxemburg Foundation as part of the global health programme. During this time, Van Aken spent two years living with his family in Jaffa, Israel.

Since October 2024 he has been federal chairman of the Left Party, alongside Ines Schwerdtner.

He was one of the dual leading candidates for The Left in the 2025 German federal election, along with Heidi Reichinnek. In this election, the Left Party gained an additional 25 seats in the Bundestag, raising the number of its seats from 39 to 64.

== Political positions ==
Van Aken considers the position on migration policy advocated by Friedrich Merz (CDU), to apply denaturalisation (which would require an amendment to the German Basic Law) in cases where people with multiple citizenship commit multiple crimes after obtaining German citizenship as racist.
