= Digital footprint =

One's unique set of traceable digital activities

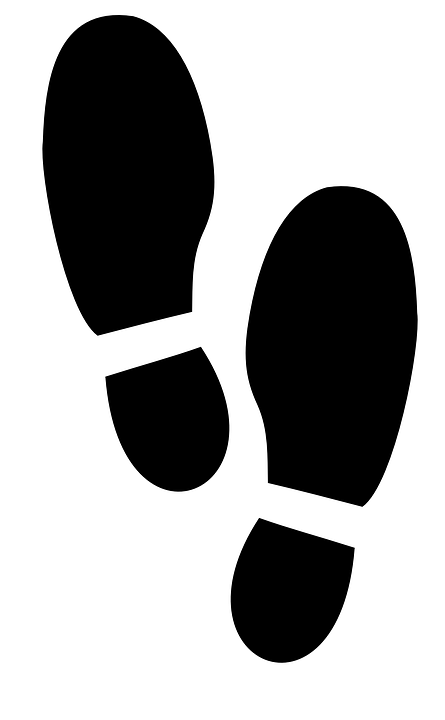
A symbol like this is often used to convey a digital footprint.

Digital footprint or digital shadow refers to one's unique set of traceable digital activities, actions, contributions, and communications manifested on the Internet or digital devices. Digital footprints can be classified as either passive or active. Passive footprints consist of a user's web-browsing activity and information stored as cookies. Users intentionally create active footprints to share information on websites or social media. While the term usually applies to a person, a digital footprint can also refer to a business, organization or corporation.

Digital footprints can have consequences for privacy, advertising, employment, and reputation. Online activities can produce information that is gathered, linked and analyzed by any group or other parties, which can be used for inferences to be drawn about people. Research on digital footprints has also explored the relationship between difference in access to digital technologies, and difference in people's capacity to manage their online data, and their role in digital inequality.

On one side, it is the subject of many privacy issues. For example, without an individual's authorization, strangers can piece together information about that individual by only using search engines. Social inequalities are exacerbated by the limited access afforded to marginalized communities. Furthermore, employers use a candidate's digital footprint for online vetting. Between two equal candidates, a candidate with a positive digital footprint may have an advantage. As technology use becomes more widespread, even children generate larger digital footprints with potential positive and negative consequences such as college admissions. Media and information literacy frameworks and educational efforts promote awareness of digital footprints as part of a citizen's digital privacy. Because digital footprints are difficult to avoid, scholars and policymakers increasingly emphasize the importance of understanding how online behavior can shape public perception and opportunities.

== Types of digital footprints ==
Passive digital footprints are a data trail that an individual involuntarily leaves online. They can be stored in various ways depending on the situation. A footprint may be stored in an online database as a "hit" within an online environment. The footprint may track the user's IP address, when it was created, where it came from, and the footprint later being analyzed. In an offline environment, administrators can access and view the machine's actions without seeing who performed them. Examples of passive digital footprints are apps that use geolocations, websites that download cookies onto one's appliance, or browser history. Although passive digital footprints are often unavoidable, researchers note that their scope and visibility may vary depending on platform policies, user behavior, and data retention practices.

Active digital footprints are deliberate, as they are posted or shared information willingly. They can also be stored in a variety of ways depending on the situation. A digital footprint can be stored when a user logs into a site and makes a post or change; the registered name is connected to the edit in an online environment. Examples of active digital footprints include social media posts, video or image uploads, or changes to various websites.

== Privacy issues ==
Digital footprints are not a digital identity or passport, but the content and metadata collected impacts internet privacy, trust, security, digital reputation, and recommendation. As the digital world expands and integrates with more aspects of life, ownership and rights concerning data become increasingly important. Digital footprints are controversial in that privacy and openness compete. Scott McNealy, CEO of Sun Microsystems, said “Get over it” in 1999 when referring to privacy on the Internet. The quote later became a commonly used phrase in discussing private data and what companies do with it. Digital footprints are a privacy concern because they are a set of traceable actions, contributions, and ideas shared by users. It can be tracked and can allow internet users to learn about human actions.

Interested parties use Internet footprints for several reasons; including cyber-vetting, where interviewers could research applicants based on their online activities. Internet footprints are also used by law enforcement agencies to provide information unavailable otherwise due to a lack of probable cause. Also, digital footprints are used by marketers to find what products a user is interested in or to inspire ones' interest in a particular product based on similar interests.

Social networking systems may record the activities of individuals, with data becoming a life stream. Such social media usage and roaming services allow digital tracing data to include individual interests, social groups, behaviors, and location. Such data is gathered from sensors within devices and collected and analyzed without user awareness. When many users choose to share personal information about themselves through social media platforms, including places they visited, timelines and their connections, they are unaware of the privacy setting choices and the security consequences associated with them. Many social media sites, like Facebook, collect an extensive amount of information that can be used to piece together a user's personality. Information gathered from social media, such as the number of friends a user has, can predict whether or not the user has an introvert or extrovert personality. Moreover, a survey of SNS users revealed that 87% identified their work or education level, 84% identified their full date of birth, 78% identified their location, and 23% listed their phone numbers.Digital footprints may contain data on a person's interests, social interactions, location, and their activities. Digital services can obtain data directly from users in addition to information created by users' access to websites, applications and connected devices. The volume of data collected and the reasons for data processing vary according to the services, their policies and privacy laws. A survey from the Pew Research Center in 2023 revealed that 73% of adults in the U.S believe they have very little or no control over the personal data that companies collect about them.

While one's digital footprint may infer personal information, such as demographic traits, sexual orientation, race, religious and political views, personality, or intelligence without individuals' knowledge, it also exposes individuals' private psychological spheres into the social sphere. Lifelogging is an example of an indiscriminate collection of information concerning an individual's life and behavior. There are actions to take to make a digital footprint challenging to track. An example of the usage or interpretation of data trails is through Facebook-influenced creditworthiness ratings, the judicial investigations around German sociologist Andrej Holm, advertisement-junk mails by the American company OfficeMax or the border incident of Canadian citizen Ellen Richardson.

== Impacts ==
=== Workforce ===
An increasing number of employers are evaluating applicants by their digital footprint through their interaction on social media due to its reduced cost and easy accessibility during the hiring process. By using such resources, employers can gain more insight into candidates beyond their well-scripted interview responses and perfected resumes. Candidates who display poor communication skills, use inappropriate language, or use drugs or alcohol are rated lower. Conversely, a candidate with a professional or family-oriented social media presence receives higher ratings. Employers also assess a candidate through their digital footprint to determine if a candidate is a good cultural fit for their organization. Suppose a candidate upholds an organization's values or shows existing passion for its mission. In that case, the candidate is more likely to integrate within the organization and could accomplish more than the average person. Although these assessments are known not to be accurate predictors of performance or turnover rates, employers still use digital footprints to evaluate their applicants. Studies suggest that applicants’ online presence can influence hiring perceptions, although its reliability as a predictor of job performance remains contested.

In some professions, maintaining a digital footprint is essential. People will search the internet for specific doctors and their reviews. Half of the search results for a particular physician link to third-party rating websites. For this reason, prospective patients may unknowingly choose their physicians based on their digital footprint in addition to online reviews. Furthermore, a generation relies on social media for their livelihood as influencers by using their digital footprint. These influencers have dedicated fan bases that may be eager to follow recommendations. As a result, marketers pay influencers to promote their products among their followers, since this medium may yield better returns than traditional advertising. Consequently, one's career may be reliant on their digital footprint.

=== Children ===
Generation Alpha will not be the first generation born into the internet world. As such, a child's digital footprint is becoming more significant than ever before and their consequences may be unclear. As a result of parenting enthusiasm, an increasing number of parents will create social media accounts for their children at a young age, sometimes even before they are born. Parents may post up to 13,000 photos of a child on social media in their celebratory state before their teen years of everyday life or birthday celebrations. Furthermore, these children are predicted to post 70,000 times online on their own by 18. The advent of posting on social media creates many opportunities to gather data from minors. Since an identity's basic components contain a name, birth date, and address, these children are susceptible to identity theft. While parents may assume that privacy settings may prevent children's photos and data from being exposed, they also have to trust that their followers will not be compromised. Outsiders may take the images to pose as these children's parents or post the content publicly. For example, during the Facebook-Cambridge Analytica data scandal, friends of friends leaked data to data miners. Due to the child's presence on social media, their privacy may be at risk.

=== Teenagers ===
Some professionals argue that young people entering the workforce should consider the effect of their digital footprint on their marketability and professionalism. Having a digital footprint may be very good for students, as college admissions staff and potential employers may decide to research into prospective student's and employee's online profiles, leading to an enormous impact on the students' futures. Researchers argue that adolescents’ online activities can have long-term implications for educational and professional opportunities. Instead, someone who acts apathetic towards the impression they are making online will struggle if they one day choose to attend college or enter into the workforce. Teens who plan to receive a higher education will have their digital footprint reviewed and assessed as a part of the application process. Besides, if the teens that have the intention of receiving a higher education are planning to do so with financial help and scholarships, then they need to consider that their digital footprint will be evaluated in the application process to get scholarships.

=== Inequality ===
Digital footprints may reinforce existing social inequalities. In a conceptual overview of this topic, researchers argue that both actively and passively generated digital footprints represent a new dimension of digital inequality, with marginalized groups systematically disadvantaged in terms of online visibility and opportunity. Corporations and governments increasingly rely on algorithms that use digital footprints to automate decisions across areas like employment, credit, and public services, amplifying existing social inequalities. Because marginalized groups often have less extensive or lower-quality digital footprints, they are at greater risk of being misrepresented, excluded, or disadvantaged by these algorithmic processes. Examples of low-quality digital footprints include a lack of data on online databases that track credit scores, legal history or medical history. People from higher socio-economic backgrounds are more likely to maintain favorable or carefully curated digital footprints, which can facilitate access to critical services, financial assistance, and employment.

An example of digital inequality is access to essential e-government services. In the United Kingdom, individuals lacking a sufficient digital footprint face challenges in verifying their identities. This creates new barriers to services such as public housing and healthcare, producing a form of “double disadvantage”. A double disadvantage compounds existing issues in digital access by excluded from digital life lack both access and the digital reputation required to navigate public systems. Other communities with private access or open access to technology and digital education from an early age will have greater access to government e-services.

The United Nations International Children's Emergency Fund's (UNICEF) State of the World's Children 2017 report highlights how digital footprints are linked to broader issues of equity, inclusion, and safety, emphasizing that marginalized communities experience greater risks in digital environments.

== Media and information literacy ==
Media and information literacy (MIL) encompasses the knowledge and skills necessary to access, evaluate, and create information across different media platforms. Understanding and managing one's digital footprint is increasingly recognized as a core component of MIL.

Scholars suggest that digital footprint literacy falls under privacy literacy, which refers to the ability to critically manage and protect personal information in online environments. Studies indicate that disparities in MIL access across countries and socio-demographic groups contribute to uneven abilities to manage digital footprints safely.

=== Education ===
Organizations like UNESCO and UNICEF advocate for integrating MIL frameworks into formal education systems as a way to mitigate digital inequalities. However, there remains a notable lack of standardized MIL curricula globally, particularly concerning privacy literacy and digital footprint management.

In response to these gaps, researchers in 2022 developed the "5Ds of Privacy Literacy" educational framework, which emphasizes teaching students to "define, describe, discern, determine, and decide" appropriate information flows based on context. Grounded in sociocultural learning theory, the 5Ds encourage students to make privacy decisions thoughtfully, rather than simply adhering to universal rules. Sociocultural learning theory means that students learn privacy skills not just by memorizing rules, but by actively engaging with real-world social situations, discussing them with others, and practicing decisions in authentic, contextualized settings.

This framework highlights that part of digital footprint literacy includes awareness about how people's behaviors are tracked online. Companies can infer demographic attributes such as age, gender, and political orientation without explicit disclosure. This is often done without users' awareness. Educating students about these practices aims to promote critical thinking about personal data trails.

Another part of digital footprint literacy is being able to critically assess one's own digital footprint. Initiatives like Australia's "Best Footprint Forward" program have implemented digital footprint education using real-world examples to teach critical self-assessment of online presence. Similarly, the Connecticut State Department of Education recommends incorporating digital citizenship, internet safety, and media literacy into K–12 education standards.

== See also ==
- Alternative data
- Behavioral targeting
- Browser isolation
- Data exhaust
- Digital identity
- Internet anonymity
- Internet privacy
- Online advertising
- Online identity
- Reality mining
- Reputation management
- SIGINT
- Social engineering
- Social genome
- Targeted marketing
- UK/USA Agreement
- Universal Product Code
- Web tracking
- Website
- Wire data
