= Ricarda Lang =

German politician (born 1994)

Ricarda Lang MdB
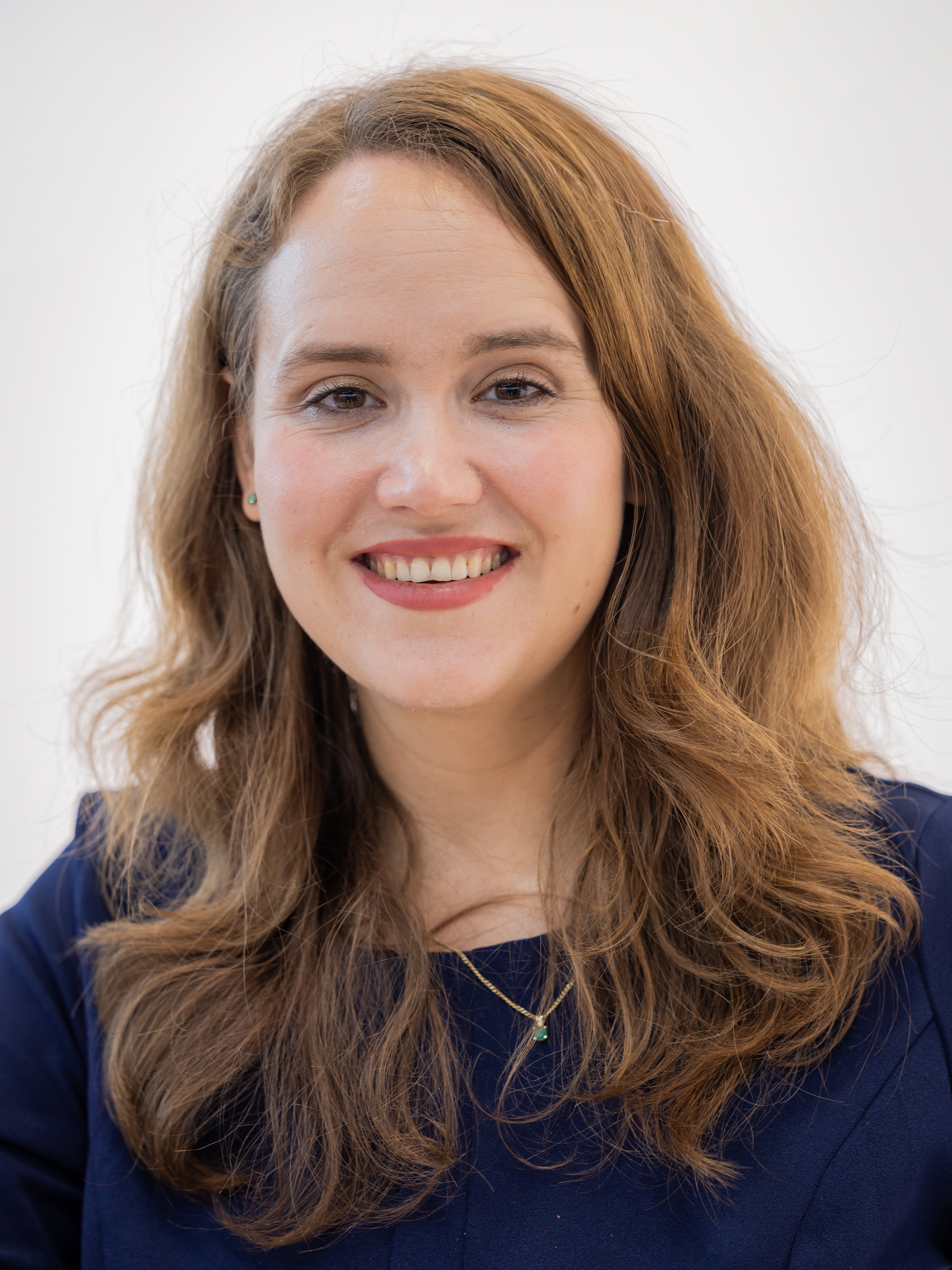
- Lang in 2025

Leader of Alliance 90/The Greens
- In office 29 January 2022 – 16 November 2024 Serving with Omid Nouripour
- Deputy: Pegah Edalatian-Schahriari; Heiko Knopf; Marc Urbatsch
- Preceded by: Annalena Baerbock
- Succeeded by: Franziska Brantner

Deputy Leader of Alliance 90/The Greens
- In office 16 November 2019 – 29 January 2022 Serving with Jamila Schäfer
- Leader: Annalena Baerbock; Robert Habeck
- Preceded by: Gesine Agena
- Succeeded by: Pegah Edalatian

Leader of the Green Youth
- In office October 2017 – November 2019 Serving with Max Lucks
- Preceded by: Jamila Schäfer
- Succeeded by: Anna Peters

Member of the Bundestag for Baden-Württemberg
- Incumbent
- Assumed office 26 October 2021
- Preceded by: multi-member district
- Constituency: Alliance 90/The Greens list

Personal details
- Born: Ricarda Lang; 17 January 1994 (age 32) Filderstadt, Baden-Württemberg, Germany
- Party: Alliance 90/The Greens
- Domestic partner: Florian Wilsch (engaged 2023)
- Education: German: Hölderlin-Gymnasium Nürtingen (high school; graduated, 2012); Humboldt University of Berlin LL.B. Heidelberg University (did not graduate)

Ricarda Lang (born 17 January 1994) is a German politician of the Alliance 90/The Greens who has been serving as a member of the Bundestag since 2021.

Lang served as her party's co-leader from 2022 to 2024, alongside Omid Nouripour. Previously, she was co-deputy leader of the party and spokeswoman for women's policy from 2019 to 2022, and co-leader of the Green Youth from 2017 to 2019.

== Early life and education ==
Lang was raised by a single mother, who was a social worker and worked at a women's shelter. Her father was the sculptor Eckhart Dietz, who died in 2019. After graduating from the Hölderlin-Gymnasium Nürtingen in 2012, Lang began studying law, first at the Heidelberg University and later at the Humboldt University of Berlin, eventually dropping out in 2019 without graduating. In 2025 she finished her bachelor of law.

== Political career ==
=== Early beginnings ===
Lang joined the Green Youth in 2012 at the age of 18. From 2014 to 2015, Lang was speaker for the Campus Greens, the Greens' student association. She was a member of the district executive of the Friedrichshain-Kreuzberg Greens from 2015 to 2016. In October 2015, she became an assessor in the federal board of the Green Youth, and in October 2017 was elected co-spokesperson at the federal congress. In November 2019, she was elected as deputy chairwoman of the Greens and spokeswoman for women's policy.

Lang stood in the 2019 European Parliament election in 25th place on the Greens list, but was not elected.

=== Member of the German Parliament, 2021–present ===
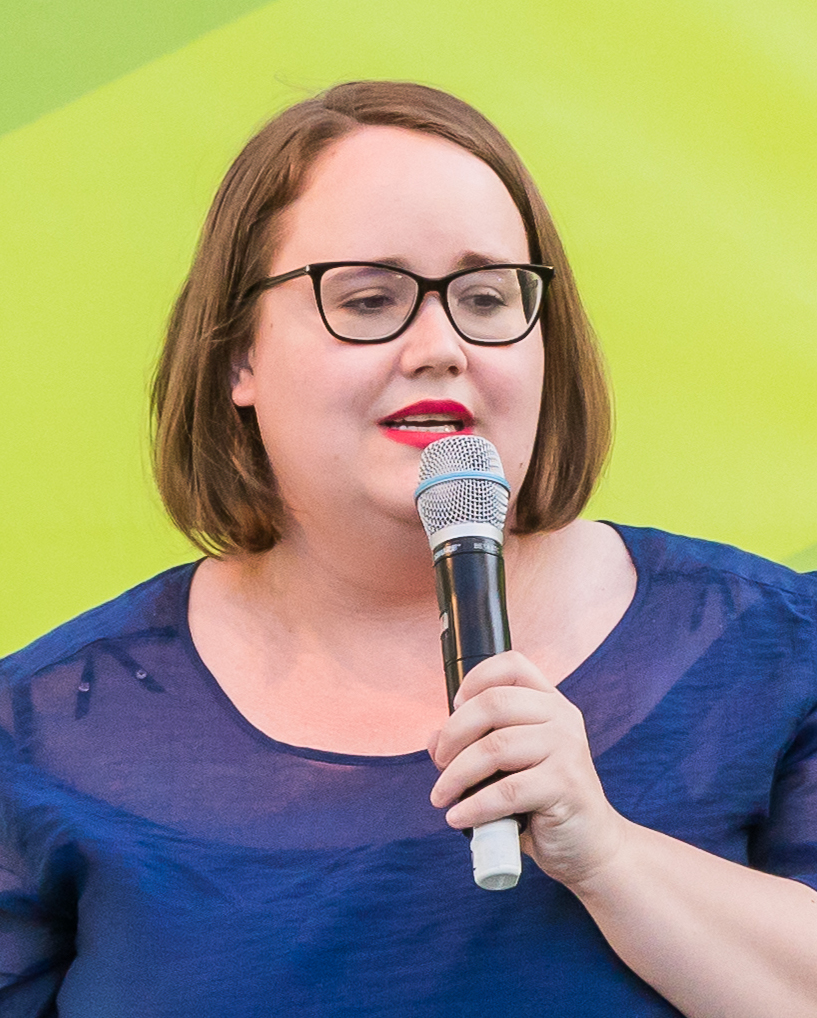
Ricarda Lang speaking at a rally, 2022

Lang successfully ran for the Bundestag in the 2021 German federal election in tenth place on the Baden-Württemberg list. She also stood in the Backnang – Schwäbisch Gmünd constituency and placed fifth with 11.5% of votes. She became the first bisexual member of the Bundestag. In parliament, she is a member of the Committee for Family, Seniors, Women and Youth and a deputy member of the Committee for Labor and Social Affairs.

In the negotiations to form a coalition government between the SPD, Greens, and FDP following the 2021 federal elections, Lang led her party's delegation in the working group on equality; her co-chairs from the other parties were Petra Köpping (SPD) and Herbert Mertin (FDP).

On 29 January 2022, Lang was elected unopposed at chairwoman of the Greens, along with Omid Nouripour. They succeeded Annalena Baerbock and Robert Habeck, who stepped down after joining the Scholz cabinet. Following a series of election defeats on the state level, Lang and Nouripour announced their resignation in September 2024.

In early 2022, Lang became one of the six subjects of an embezzlement investigation launched by the Berlin public prosecutor's office into the entire leadership board of the Green Party over the payment of so-called 'corona bonuses,' which had been paid in 2020 to all employees of the party's federal office and at the same time to its board.

In the 2025 federal election, Lang ran again in the Backnang- Schwäbisch Gmünd constituency and was re-elected to the Bundestag via the Alliance 90/The Greens state list for Baden-Württemberg as she did not win her constituency.

=== Publication and awards ===
In June 2024, Lang was awarded Newcomer of the Year at the Politikaward, presented by the magazine Politik & Kommunikation and the Quadriga University of Applied Science.

In 2025, together with sociologist Steffen Mau, she co-authord the book Der große Umbruch: Ein Gespräch über Krisen, Konflikte und Kompromisse, published by Ullstein Verlag.

== Political positions ==
Lang is considered a representative of the left wing of the party. Her main areas of concerns are social justice and climate policy. She also supports feminism, body positivity, and queer politics. She is critical of individualist approaches to policy; for example, to tackle climate change, she opposes focusing on individual consumption and advocates phasing out coal and ending subsidies to environmentally damaging industries. She calls the individualisation of these issues a "ploy to divert attention from the culpability of corporations and political responsibility."

Lang's political goals include an increase in Hartz IV payments, better pay for caregivers, limits on precariat employment, and more support for people living in rural areas. She supports the admission of climate refugees; in particular, she proposes offering EU citizenship to residents of Pacific island nations whose territory is severely threatened by rising sea levels.

Lang supports arms deliveries to Ukraine in the wake of the Russian incursion, calling in the fall of 2022 "that we need to deliver more weapons, that we need to speed up."

== Personal life ==
Lang has lived in Berlin since 2014. She is bisexual, and became the first openly bisexual Bundestag member upon her election in 2021. On 25 March 2023, she announced her engagement with the mathematician Florian Wilsch working at Leibniz University Hannover. In August 2024, she married Florian Wilsch.
