= Alfonso Pantisano =

German LGBT rights activist

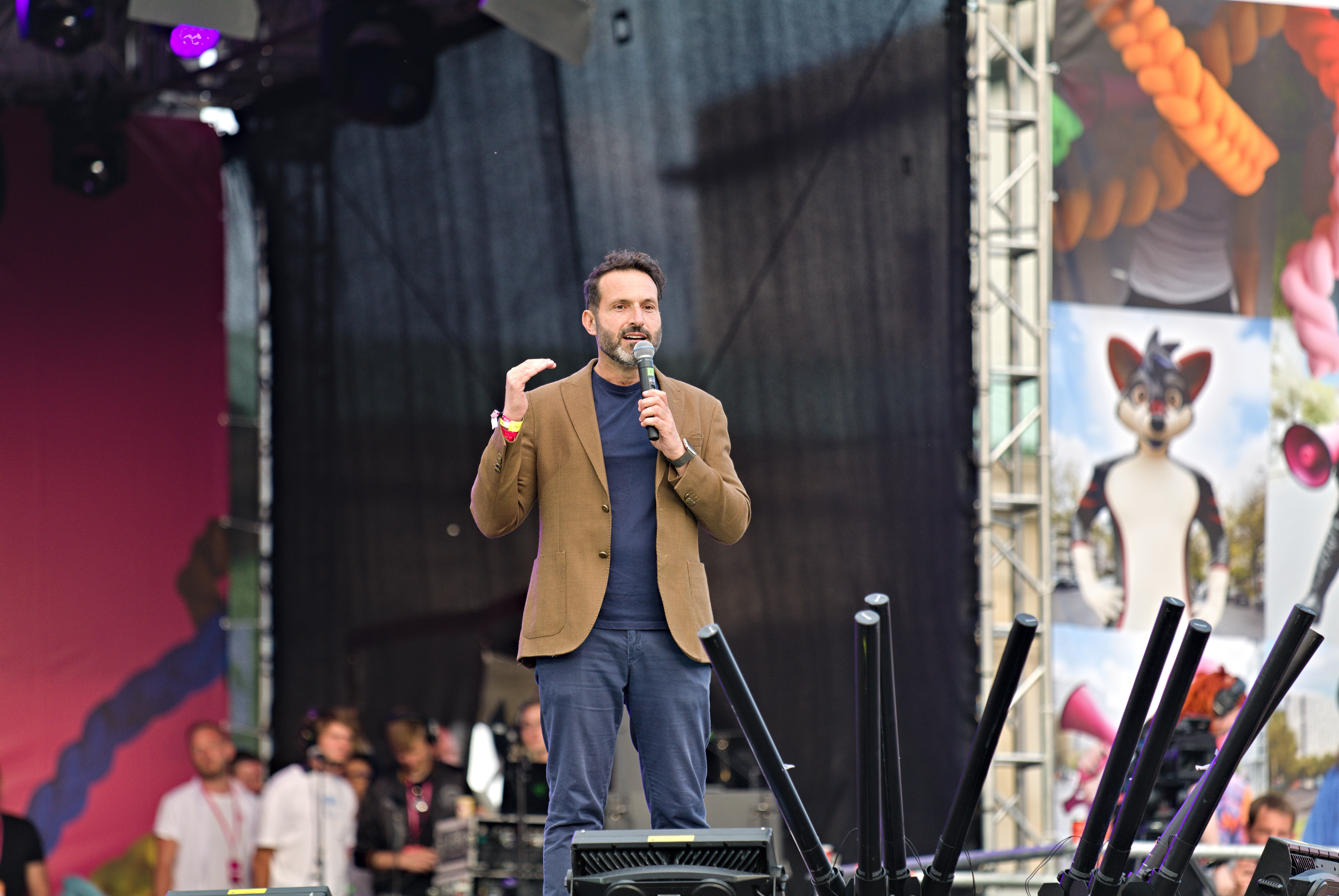
- Alfonso Pantisano at the Christopher Street Day protest in Berlin, 2023

Queer Berlin Liaison Officer
- Incumbent
- Assumed office May 2023
- Preceded by: Office created

Personal details
- Born: 1975 (age 50–51) Waiblingen, West Germany
- Party: Social Democratic Party of Germany
- Relations: Luigi Pantisano (brother)

Alfonso Pantisano (born 1975) is a German LGBT rights activist serving as the inaugural Queer Berlin Liaison Officer as part of the governing Berlin Senate in Berlin, Germany. He is part of the Social Democrats (SPD) party in Germany.

== Background and activism ==
Pantisano was born in Waiblingen, West Germany to Italian parents from Calabria. He grew up in both Italy and Germany. After coming out as gay to his parents aged 19 he was kicked out of home; he later reconciled with his parents after 17 years. His brother Luigi was a city councillor in Stuttgart, before becoming a member of the Bundestag for Die Linke in May 2025.

Pantisano came to prominence protesting the Russian gay propaganda law.

Prior to his appointment as Queer Berlin Liaison Officer, Pantisano was a member of the executive board of LSVD, Germany's largest LGBT rights organisation.
