= Max Lucks =

German politician (born 1997)

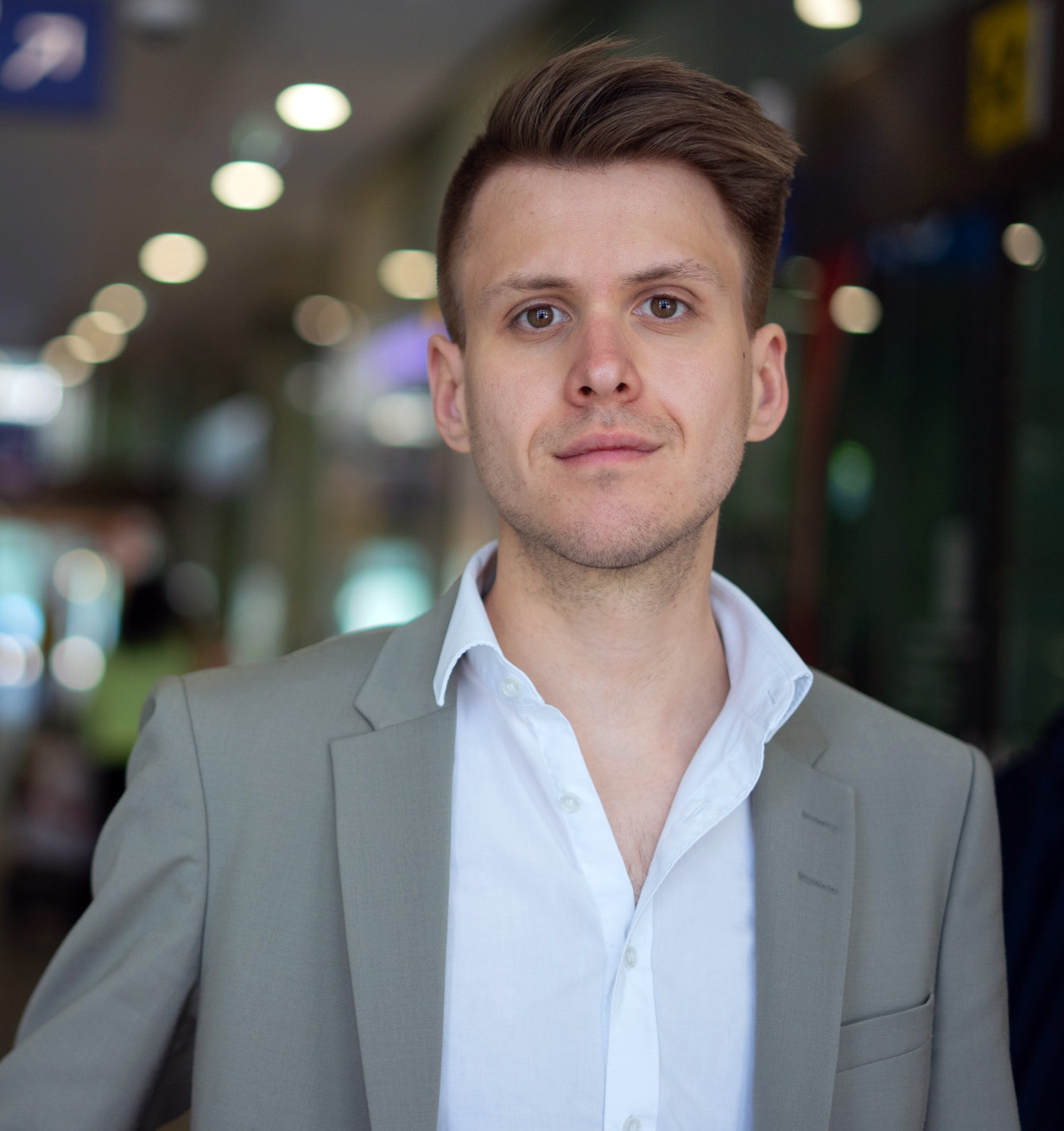
- Lucks in 2023

Member of the Bundestag
- Incumbent
- Assumed office 26 October 2021
- Constituency: North Rhine-Westphalia

Leader of the Green Youth
- In office October 2017 – November 2019 Serving with Ricarda Lang
- Preceded by: Moritz Heuberger
- Succeeded by: Georg Kurz

Personal details
- Born: 19 April 1997 (age 29) Gelsenkirchen-Ückendorf, Germany
- Party: Alliance 90/The Greens
- Website: Official website

Max Lucks (born 19 April 1997) is a German politician of Alliance 90/The Greens who has been serving as a member of the Bundestag in the 20th Bundestag that has been elected in the German federal election on 26 September 2021. He was the spokesperson for Green Youth, the youth organisation of Alliance 90/The Greens, from October 2017 to November 2019. On 23 February 2025, he was re-elected to the Bundestag.

== Life ==
After graduating from the Märkische Schule in Bochum-Wattenscheid in 2015, Lucks began studying social science at the Ruhr University Bochum in 2016. Alongside his studies, he worked as a public relations officer, fundraiser and student assistant. He completed his studies in 2022 with a Bachelor of Arts degree.

== Political career ==
=== Early beginnings ===
Lucks has been a member of the Green Youth since 2011 and joined the Green Party in 2013. His reasons for becoming politicised were the planned closure of the Wattenscheid train station and neo-Nazis in the area. From 2014 to 2015, he was an assessor on the federal board of the Green Youth and an assessor on the district board of Alliance 90/The Greens in Bochum. From 2015 to 2017 he served as a state spokesman for the Green Youth NRW, and from 2017 to 2019, he served as co-chairman, alongside Ricarda Lang.

=== Member of the German Parliament, 2021–present ===
In the Bundestag, Lucks serves on the Committee on Foreign Affairs, the Committee on Human Rights and Humanitarian Aid and the Subcommittee on Disarmament, Arms Control and Non-Proliferation. He was elected to the German Bundestag via the North Rhine-Westphalia state list of Alliance 90/The Greens.

At the beginning of the 20th legislative period of the German Bundestag, he became the youngest full member of the Foreign Affairs Committee. In addition to his committee assignments, Lucks has been a member of the German delegation to the Parliamentary Assembly of the Council of Europe (PACE) since 2022. In the Assembly, he serves on the Committee on Political Affairs and Democracy and on its Subcommittee on Middle East Affairs and its Sub-Committee on Disability, Multiple and Intersectional Discrimination. He is also the chairman of the German-Turkish Parliamentary Friendship Group and a member of the German-Mexican Parliamentary Friendship Group. Since 2023, he has been the rapporteur for Iran there. Lucks has been a member of the European Commission against Racism and Intolerance (ECRI) since 2024.

Since 2022, he has been a member of the board of trustees of the Magnus Hirschfeld Foundation.

Since 27 January 2025, he has been a member of the PACE Committee on Legal Affairs and Human Rights.

== Other activities ==
- German Foundation for World Population (DSW), Member of the Parliamentary Advisory Board (since 2022)
- Bundesstiftung Magnus Hirschfeld (Magnus Hirschfeld Foundation), Member of the Board of Trustees (since 2022)
- German United Services Trade Union (ver.di), Member

== Controversy ==
Along with Volker Beck, Terry Reintke and Felix Banaszak, Lucks was temporarily detained when Beck wanted to speak publicly at Gay Pride Istanbul in June 2016. Lucks outed himself as gay in his first speech in the German Bundestag on 16 December 2021.

== Views ==
His focus is on human rights and foreign policy.

In June 2016, he was arrested at Istanbul Pride, accompanied by Terry Reintke, a member of the European Parliament. Lucks has been campaigning for the global improvement of the situation of lesbian, gay, bisexual and trans* people (LGBT*) ever since. After the ban of the 2022 Europride in Belgrade, he accused Serbian President Aleksandar Vučić of using minorities as 'pawns'.

In the German Bundestag, Lucks pushed for the recognition of the genocide of the Yazidis by the Islamic State in 2014. In January 2023, the genocide was finally recognised by the German Bundestag. When it became known that Yazidis were increasingly at risk of deportation, he sharply criticised Minister of the Interior Nancy Faeser. Lucks is calling for a separate paragraph for Yazidis in the Residence Act.

On 7 April 2022, he supported the motion of the Kubicki group, among others, against compulsory vaccination against SARS-CoV-2. In doing so, he took a minority position within the Greens. He did not back the motion by the Baehrens/Janecek group, among others, for mandatory vaccination from the age of 60, which was preferred by the SPD and Greens majority.

He belongs to the left wing of his party.
