= Timon Dzienus =

German politician

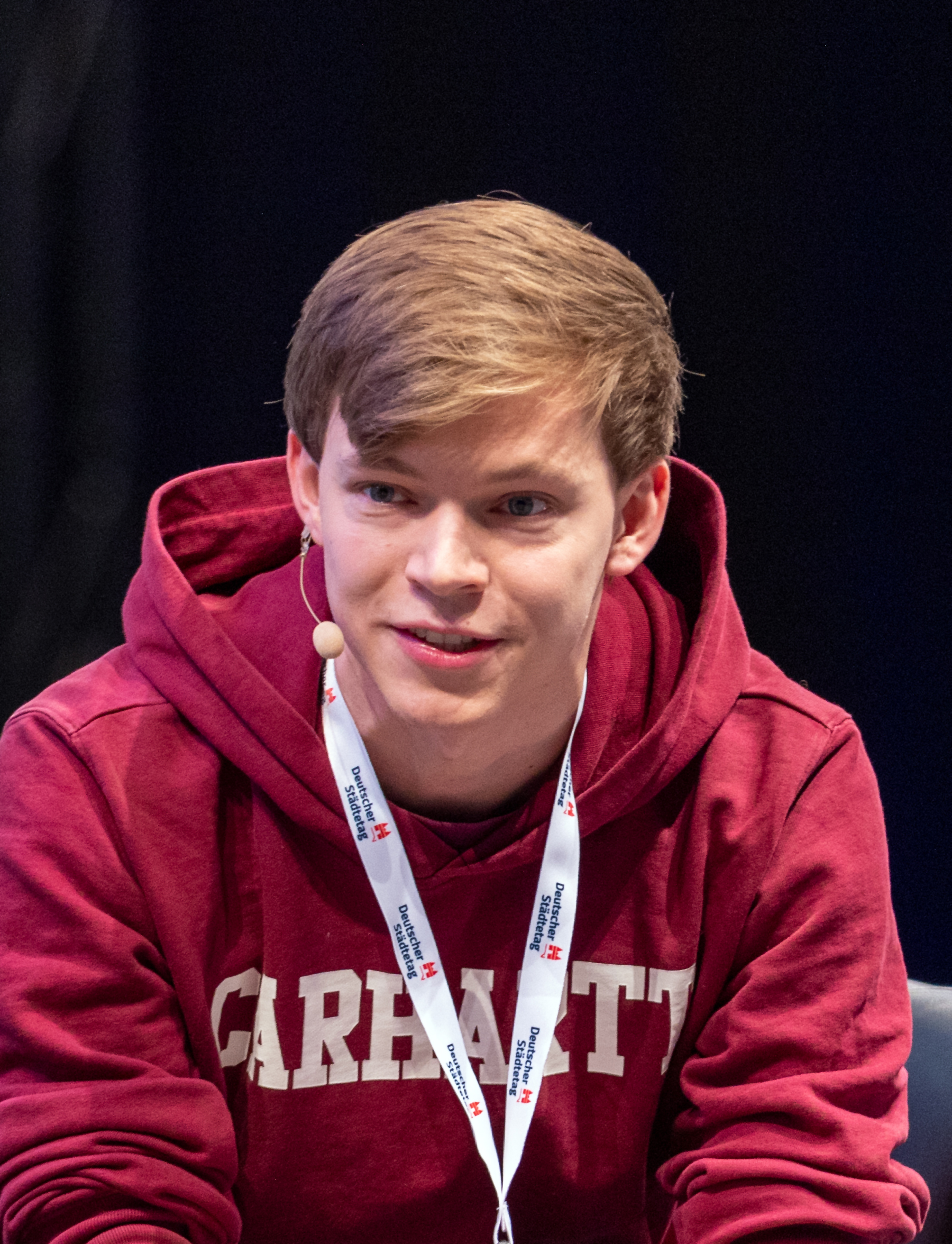
- Dzienus in 2021

Member of the Bundestag
- Incumbent
- Assumed office 2025

Personal details
- Born: 25 May 1996 (age 30)
- Party: Alliance 90/The Greens

Timon Michele Dzienus is a German politician belonging to the Alliance 90/The Greens. In the 2025 German federal election, he was elected to the German Bundestag. His father comes from Poland.

Dzienus was spokesperson for the Green Youth alongside Sarah-Lee Heinrich from October 2021 until October 2023.
