= Pantano (surname) =

Pantano is an Italian surname. Notable people with the surname include:

- Giancarlo Pantano (born 1977), Italian footballer
- Giorgio Pantano (born 1979), Italian racing driver
- Ilario Pantano (born 1971), United States Marine Corps officer
- Jarlinson Pantano (born 1988), Colombian cyclist
- Paul Pantano (born 1982), Australian actor
- Stefano Pantano (born 1962), Italian fencer
- Tony Pantano (died 2023), Italian-born Australian musician
