= Luigi Pantisano =

German politician (born 1979)

Luigi Pantisano MdB
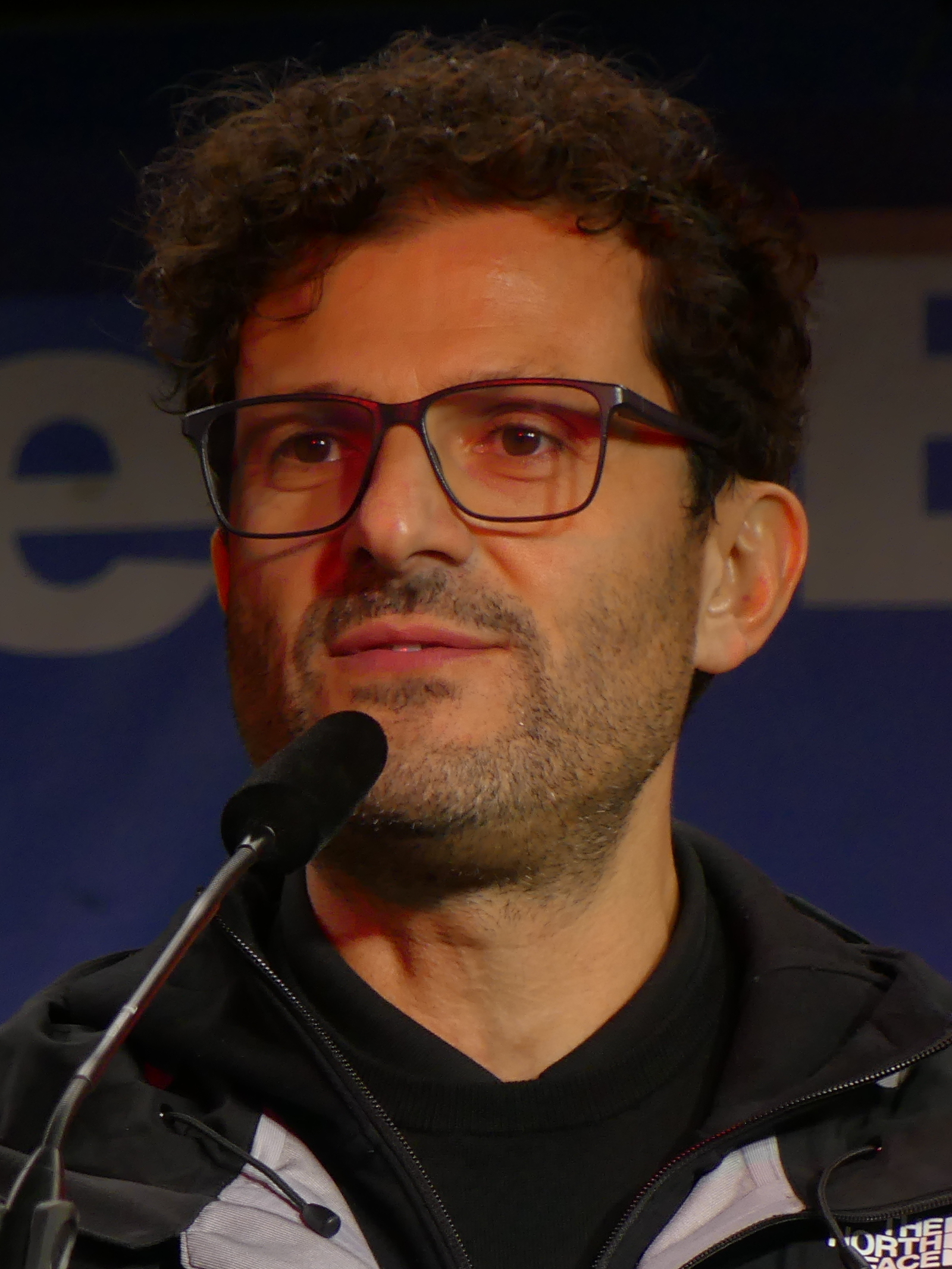
- Pantisano in 2024

Leader of The Left
- Incumbent
- Assumed office 20 June 2026 Serving with Ines Schwerdtner
- Preceded by: Jan van Aken

Member of the Bundestag from Baden-Württemberg
- Incumbent
- Assumed office 25 March 2025

Personal details
- Born: 28 July 1979 (age 47) Waiblingen, West Germany
- Party: Die Linke

Luigi Pantisano (born 28 July 1979) is a German politician. He has been co-leader of The Left since June 2026. He has been a member of the Bundestag since the 2025 German federal election.

== Early life and career ==
=== Youth and education ===
Luigi Pantisano was born to Italian guest worker parents and grew up with his brother Alfonso Pantisano as a toddler in Calabria. After attending the Staufer Haupt-und Werkrealschule in Waiblingen and training as an architectural draftsman, Pantisano studied architecture at the Stuttgart Technology University of Applied Sciences and the Tokyo Institute of Technology from 2000 to 2005. He subsequently studied urban planning at the University of Stuttgart and graduated with a degree in engineering in 2008.

=== Professional activities ===
From 2009 to 2014, he worked as a district manager in Konstanz, and from 2011 to 2015, he was an academic assistant for research and teaching at the Urban Planning Institute of the University of Stuttgart. In 2015, he held various teaching positions at the Universities of Stuttgart and Konstanz, as well as at the Stuttgart University of Technology and Design (HTWG).

From 2015 to 2016, Pantisano was political director of the SÖS-Linke-PluS parliamentary group in the Stuttgart city council and, in 2017, a research assistant to Bernd Riexinger.

== Political career ==
Luigi Pantisano's involvement in local politics began, according to his own statements, around 1999. In 2017, he joined the Left Party. In 2020, he ran for mayor of Konstanz. After being ahead in the first round of voting, he lost to incumbent Ulrich Burchardt in the second round.

In 2021, Pantisano was deputy state spokesperson for Die Linke Baden-Württemberg. From 2022 to 2024, Pantisano was a member of the party's federal executive committee.

In the 2025 German federal election, Luigi Pantisano ran in the Stuttgart I constituency and entered the German Bundestag via second vote on the state list.

As the preferred candidate of the outgoing Jan van Aken, Pantisano announced his candidacy for co-chairmanship of the Left Party alongside Ines Schwerdtner on 16 April 2026. He was elected unopposed on 20 June 2026, with 53.3 percent of the vote. He is the first chairman of his party with a migration background.

== Controversy ==
Partisano in a statement linked the governing policies of Chancellor Friedrich Merz's center-right Christian Democratic Union (CDU) to fascism, which triggered a storm of indignation. Later he apologized saying his words were shortened and wrong in that form.

== Memberships ==
Pantisano is a member of the Chamber of Architects of Baden-Württemberg, the Association of Persecutees of the Nazi Regime – Federation of Antifascists (VVN-BdA) and the United Services Union (ver.di).
