= Ines Schwerdtner =

German publicist and politician (born 1989)

Ines Schwerdtner MdB
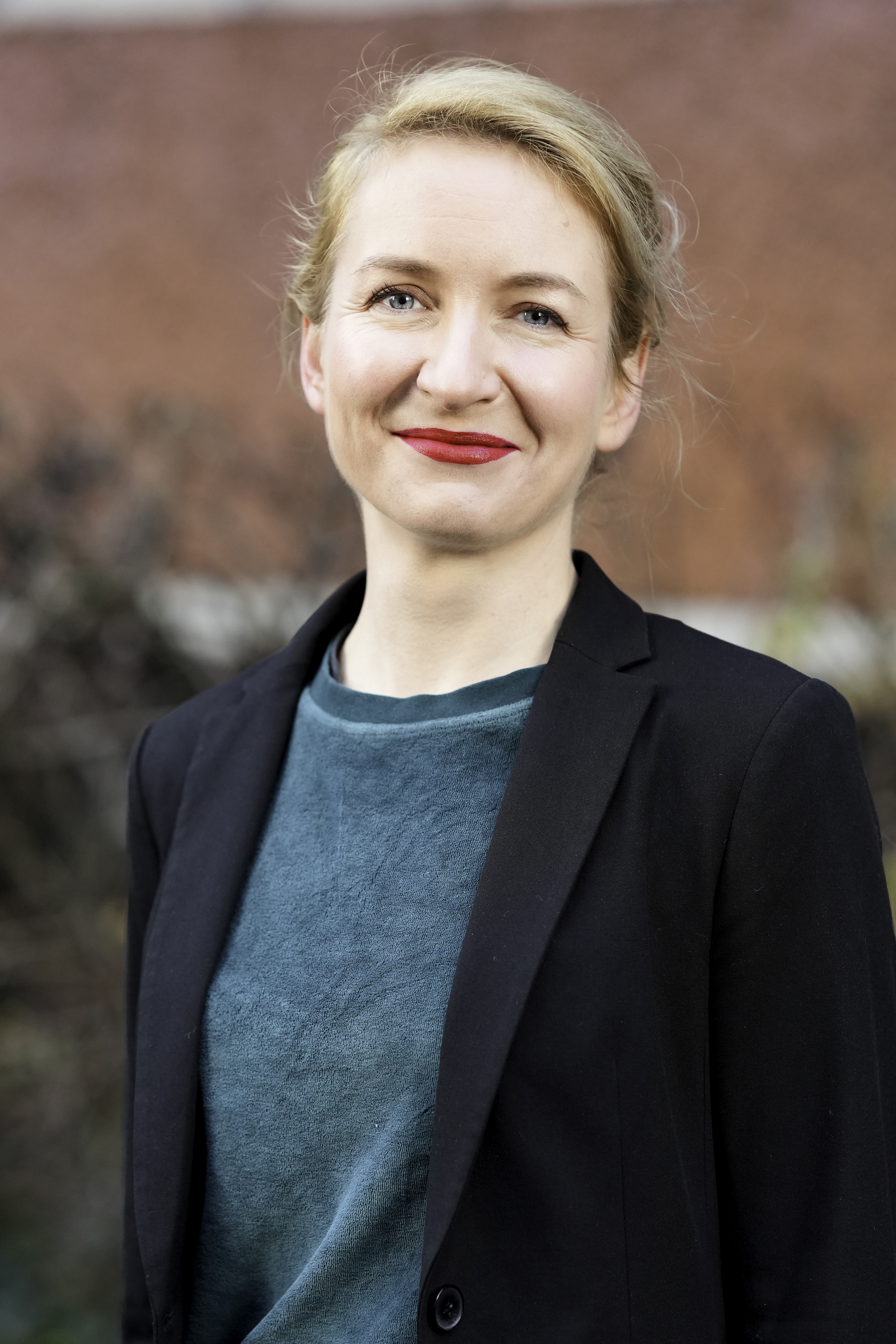
- Schwerdtner in 2025

Leader of The Left
- Incumbent
- Assumed office 19 October 2024 Serving with Jan van Aken (2024–2026); Luigi Pantisano (2026–present)
- Preceded by: Martin Schirdewan

Member of the Bundestag; for Berlin-Lichtenberg
- Incumbent
- Assumed office 25 March 2025
- Preceded by: Gesine Lötzsch

Personal details
- Born: 26 August 1989 (age 37) Werdau, East Germany
- Party: The Left (since 2023)
- Children: 1
- Education: Free University of Berlin
- Occupation: Journalist; Politician

Ines Schwerdtner (born 26 August 1989) is a German journalist and politician. She has been co-leader of The Left since October 2024. She was previously editor-in-chief of the German-language edition of the socialist magazine Jacobin from 2019 to 2023. She joined The Left in August 2023 and ran for the 2024 European Parliament election, but was not elected. In the 2025 federal election her party increased its vote share and seat count, and she became a member of the Bundestag.

== Life ==
Schwerdtner grew up in Hamburg from the age of four. She studied Political Science and English at the Free University of Berlin and was the overall coordinator of the magazine Das Argument before joining Jacobin. In addition, she was the host of the political podcast halbzehn.fm. She publishes political analyses and commentaries, among other things, in Der Freitag and in Analyse & Kritik.

Schwerdtner is involved in the initiative Deutsche Wohnen & Co. enteignen. As official representative for Jacobin, she is also one of the initiators of the "Enough is Enough" campaign, which was founded in 2022 in response to rising prices following the Russian invasion of Ukraine and what she sees as insufficient government action to support poorer segments of the population.

In 2023, as a member of the collective MF3000, she was involved in the book Ändern wir die Welt, sie braucht es! Eine marxistisch-feministische Ansage (Let's Change the World, A Marxist-Feminist Announcement), published by Querverlag. She also co-edited with Lukas Scholle the anthology Genug! (Enough!).

Since October 2024 she has been federal chairperson of the Left Party together with Jan van Aken.
