= Data exhaust =

Data produced as a by-product of online activity

Data exhaust (also exhaust data) is the trail of data generated as a by-product of users' online activity, behaviour, and transactions, rather than data they deliberately create or submit. It forms part of a broader category of unconventional data that also includes geospatial, network, and time-series data, and may be useful for predictive analytics.

Data exhaust can take the form of cookies, temporary files, log files, clickstream records and stored preferences. Actions such as visiting a web page, following a link, or dwelling on an element may all generate exhaust data that is recorded without the user's active awareness. Unlike primary content — which the user intentionally creates — exhaust data is a passive side effect of interaction.

A bank, for example, might treat the amounts and parties involved in a transaction as primary data, while secondary data could include whether the transaction was carried out at a cash machine rather than a branch.

== Uses ==
Data exhaust collected by companies is often information that is not immediately useful in isolation, but can be aggregated and analysed to improve products, personalise content, identify trends, and support quality control. Companies may also store exhaust data for future analysis or sell it to third parties. Shoshana Zuboff has described this practice as a core mechanism of what she terms surveillance capitalism, in which behavioural data generated by users is converted into predictive products.

Kosciejew notes that large quantities of often raw data are collected in this way, much of which is never analysed.

== Medical exhaust data ==
Many medical devices — including pacemakers, dialysis machines and surgical cameras — generate exhaust data as a by-product of their operation. The majority of this data is never captured or analysed, and is typically discarded once a procedure ends or a device completes its routine monitoring cycle. The potential use of data generated by implanted devices such as pacemakers raises additional legal and ethical questions around ownership and consent. Using electronic health records for research also creates challenges because of the volume of data involved, creating a need for automated algorithms to process it.

== Privacy and regulation ==
The collection and distribution of data exhaust is not in itself illegal in most jurisdictions, but its use raises questions of privacy and informed consent. Steps commonly taken to address these concerns include data anonymisation, offering users an opt-out from the sale of their data, and publishing explicit privacy policies that disclose what data is collected and how it is used.

== See also ==
- Alternative data
- Digital footprint
- Big data
- Surveillance capitalism
- Data anonymisation
