= Andrej Holm =

German sociologist

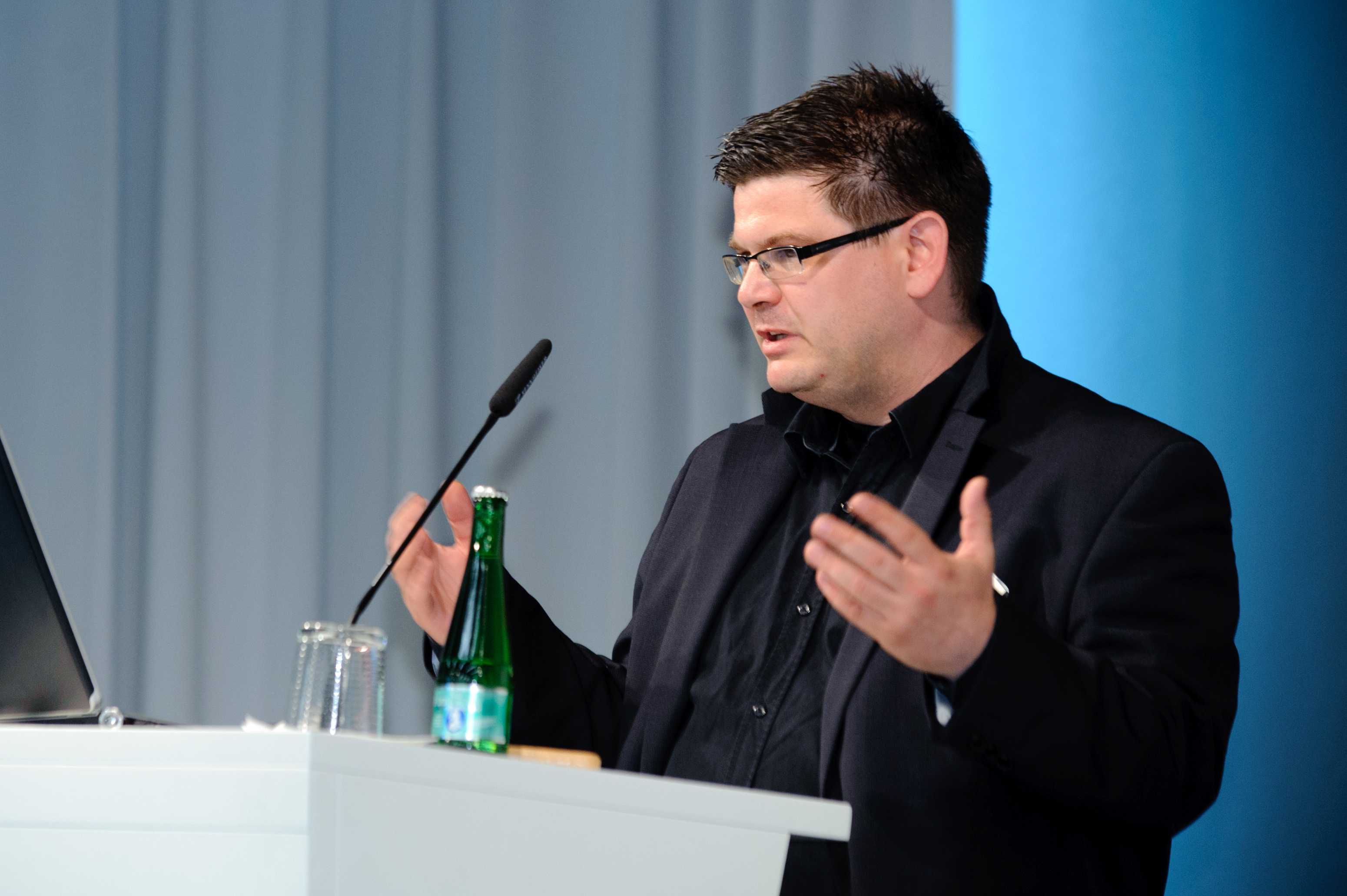
Andrej Holm

Andrej Holm (born 1970) is a German sociologist. His work focuses on urban regeneration, gentrification and housing policy.

He first came to public attention in 2007, when he was arrested and imprisoned for several weeks on terrorism charges; in 2010 the investigation of him was ended due to lack of evidence. For around one month in 2016/2017 he was under-secretary for housing in the local government of Berlin for the party Die Linke. In 2017 he was to be dismissed from his position as a research assistant at the Humboldt University of Berlin. On 9 February 2017 Holm acknowledged in a written statement that he had lied about his Stasi past and expressed his regret over his actions, both his service in the Stasi itself and his later untruthfulness about it. As a result, the university reduced its disciplinary action to a final warning and a suspension until the end of 2018.

== Background and Stasi service ==
Andrej Holm was born in Leipzig as the son of a Stasi officer, Hans Holm, who worked at the Stasi office in Berlin. At the age of 14 he volunteered to join the Stasi, and at the age of 18 he became a Stasi cadet. He took the oath as a Stasi officer in September 1989. As a result of the fall of communism and the German reunification, Stasi was dissolved in early 1990 and deemed a criminal organisation. Since German reunification past service in the Stasi has been ground for dismissal in the German public service.

== Investigation for membership in a terrorist organisation ==
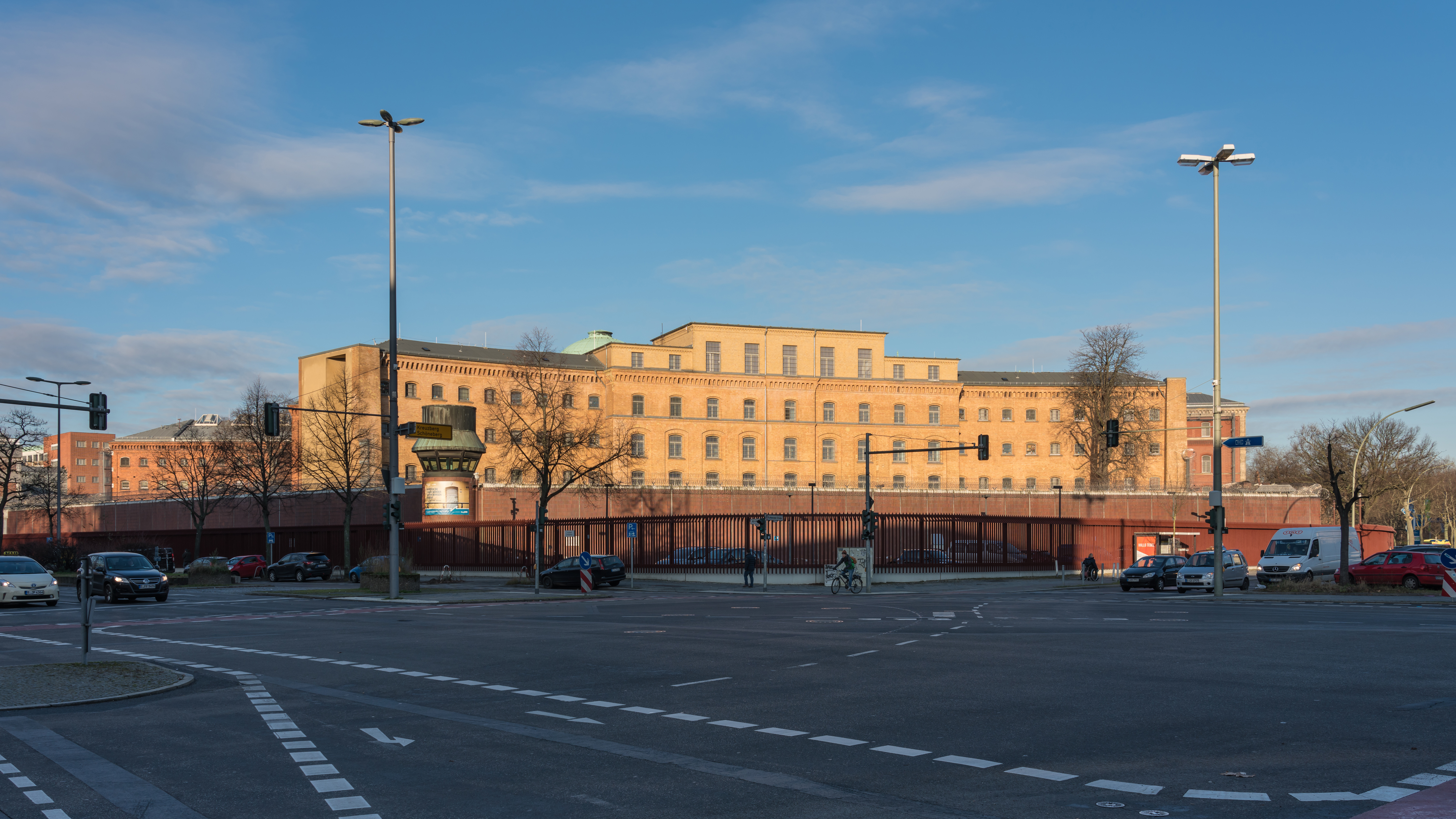
Moabit Prison, where Holm was incarcerated in 2007

In September 2006, Holm was charged with membership in a terrorist organisation, a violation of § 129a of the German Criminal Code, by the Public Prosecutor General. As a result of the investigation he was arrested on 31 July 2007, and accused of membership in the Militante gruppe (mg), a far-left militant group accused of carrying out arson attacks in multiple German states. Holm had been placed under observation by the Federal Criminal Police Office (Bundeskriminalamt or BKA) due to similarities between his own texts and material produced by the Militante gruppe; Holm had also met with known members of the group in a way that was considered to be an indication of "conspiratorial" behaviour by the prosecutor. On 31 July 2007, Holm's home and office were searched, after a man he had met with was implicated in a plot to firebomb tanks at a German military base. In the course of the search, Holm was taken into custody and flown by helicopter to the Federal Court of Justice of Germany (Bundesgerichtshof) in Karlsruhe. He was held at Berlin-Moabit prison in solitary confinement until the end of August, when his parole was ordered until at least October. The investigation of Holm formally ended 5 July 2010 due to lack of evidence.

== Dismissal as housing official in Berlin ==
For around one month in 2016/2017 Holm was a junior member of the local housing administration in Berlin, as under-secretary to the city's senator (councillor) for housing Katrin Lompscher. He was associated with the left Die Linke party, the successor of the former East German communist party, the Socialist Unity Party. As a result of the Stasi revelations, the governing mayor of Berlin Michael Müller (SPD) asked senator Lompscher to dismiss Holm, which she subsequently did.

== Disciplinary proceedings against Holm over his Stasi past at the Humboldt University ==
As a result of revelations about his Stasi past in 2017, Holm was to be dismissed from his position as a research assistant at the Humboldt University of Berlin by the university's president Sabine Kunst due to providing false information about his past in the Stasi and for refusing to acknowledge and apologize for his actions. In 2005 Holm had filled out a questionnaire which stated that he had never been a regular employee of the Stasi, although he had indeed been a full-time Stasi officer who had sworn an oath of loyalty to the Stasi.

On 9 February 2017 Holm acknowledged in a written statement that he had lied about his Stasi past and expressed his regret over his actions. In the statement, he wrote that he was "part of a repressive apparatus" and thus "had to assume structural responsibility" for the repression in the GDR. He further wrote that he "acknowledges my historical guilt and ask those who have suffered in the GDR for forgiveness."

As a result of this statement the university reduced its disciplinary action to a final warning, while Holm will remain on leave until the end of 2018.

In an interview with Die Zeit, Holm also acknowledged that Stasi was a criminal organization and a part of a "system of injustice."
