= Dagmar Andres =

German politician (born 1969)

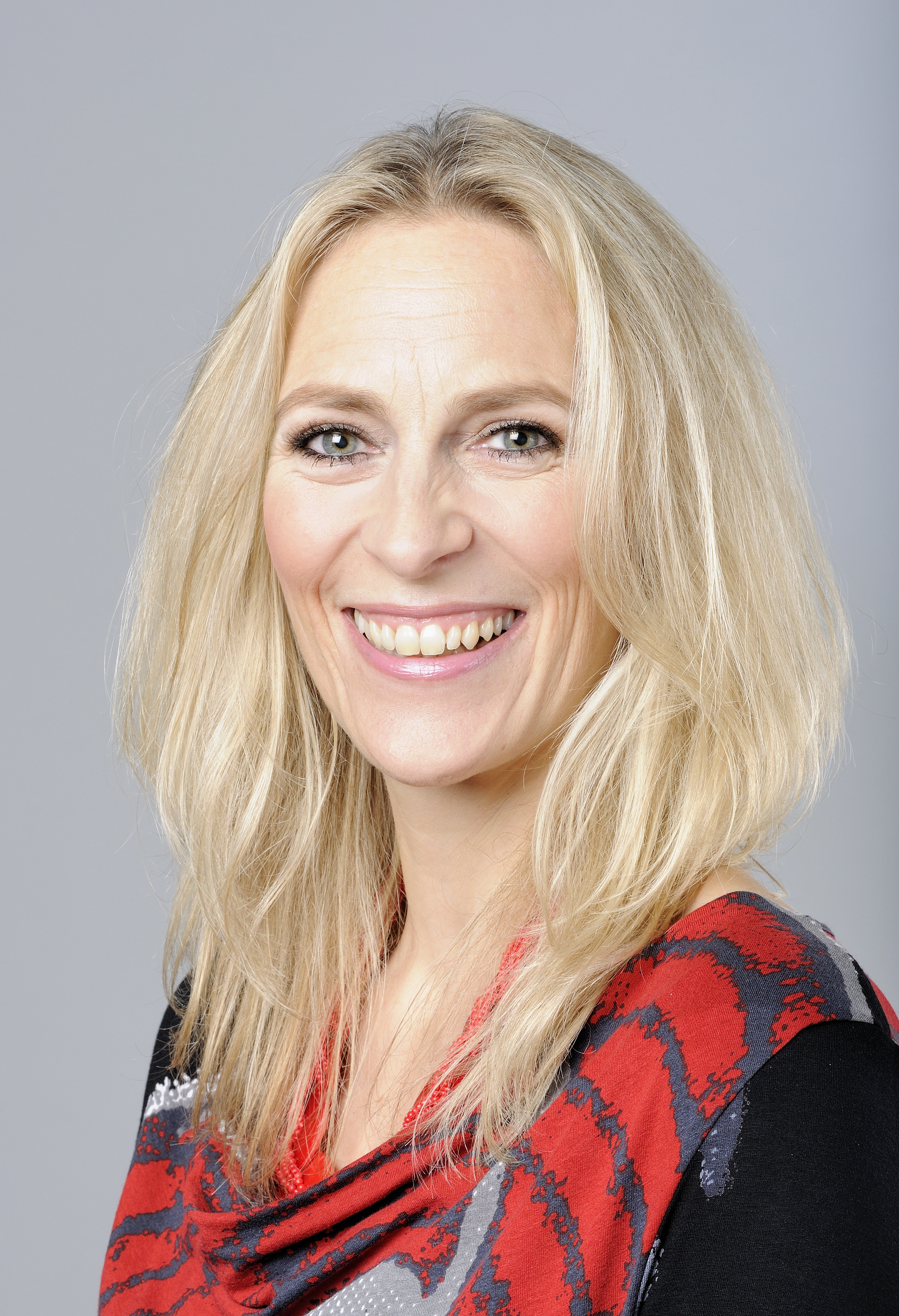

Member of the Bundestag
- In office 2021–2025
- Constituency: Euskirchen – Rhein-Erft-Kreis II

Personal details
- Born: 3 December 1969 (age 56) Cologne, West Germany
- Party: Social Democratic Party

Dagmar Andres (born 3 December 1969) is a German accountant and politician of the Social Democratic Party (SPD) who served as a Member of the Bundestag from 2021 to 2025, representing the Euskirchen – Rhein-Erft-Kreis II district, and as member of the state parliament of North Rhine-Westphalia from 2012 to 2017.

== Life and career ==
Andres trained as a tax assistant from 1992 to 1995 and worked in a tax consultancy and auditing firm in Hürth from 1995 to 2012. Parallel to her professional career, she completed her technical college entrance qualification from 1995 to 1996 and then attended the business school Kaufmännische Bildungsanstalten in Bonn, from which she graduated in 1999 as a state-certified business economist specialising in tax. From 1998 to 1999, she attended an accountancy course and graduated as a certified accountant (IHK). After being a member of the state parliament, she became head of the treasury and tax office of the municipality of Rommerskirchen in 2017. From 2019, she worked as a project manager for an independent provider of bilingual daycare centres before becoming a consultant for European Affairs, Politics & Associations at NRW.Bank in 2021.

== Political career ==
=== Career in state politics ===
Andres joined the SPD in 1986 and has held various board positions in the Schleiden local organisation. From 2008 to 2013, she was the Lechenich/Konradsheim/Ahrem/Herrig SPD district chairwoman. In 2009, she was elected to the Erftstadt town council, serving until 2018. From 2011 to 2013, she was deputy chairwoman of the SPD Erftstadt, on whose board she had previously been an assessor. From 2012 until 2017, she was a member of the State Parliament of North Rhine-Westphalia. Andres was elected to the North Rhine-Westphalian state parliament, winning the Rhein-Erft-Kreis III constituency with 43.5 per cent of the first votes against the incumbent Gregor Golland (CDU) as a direct candidate. She served on the Finance Committee, the Budget Committee and the Audit Committee. From December 2013 to 2019, Dagmar Andres was deputy chairwoman of the Rhein-Erft SPD district association. She has also been a member of the Rhein-Erft district council since 2014, where she is the financial policy spokesperson for the SPD parliamentary group and has been deputy group chairwoman since 2020. In the 2017 state election, she was defeated by the CDU candidate Gregor Golland, who ran again with 35 % of the first votes. She lost her seat in 75th place on the list. In November 2019, Andres and Daniel Dobbelstein were elected as the new chairwoman of the Rhine-Erft SPD district association. She had previously held various board positions since 2016 and took over the position from the late Guido van den Berg. She has been a member of the state executive committee and praesidium of the SPD North Rhine-Westphalia since November 2018.

=== Member of the German Parliament, 2021–2025 ===
In the 2021 Bundestag election, Andres stood in the Euskirchen - Rhein-Erft-Kreis II constituency and in 18th place on the North Rhine-Westphalian state list, after which she was elected to the Bundestag via the state list. She received 26.6% of the first votes in her constituency and, therefore, missed the direct mandate.

In parliament, Andres served on the Finance Committee and the Committee on European Affairs from 2021.

In addition to her committee assignments, Andres was part of the German delegation to the Parliamentary Assembly of the Organization for Security and Co-operation in Europe since 2022.

In April 2024, Andres announced that she would not stand in the 2025 federal elections but instead resign from active politics by the end of the parliamentary term.

== Memberships ==
Dagmar Andres is a member of the Hermann-Gmeiner-Fonds der SOS-Kinderdorf-Stiftung, the Lebenshilfe Brühl, Erftstadt, Wesseling association, the Arbeiterwohlfahrt, Sonderspaß e.V. and Brühl euer-VfK e.V.

== Private life ==
Andres is widowed and the mother of two children. She lives with her family in Erftstadt-Lechenich. She is a Roman Catholic.
