= 2025 German federal election =

- 23 February 2025

All 630 seats in the Bundestag 316 seats needed for a majority
- Opinion polls
- Registered: 60,510,631 (▼1.1%)
- Turnout: 82.5% (▲6.2 pp)
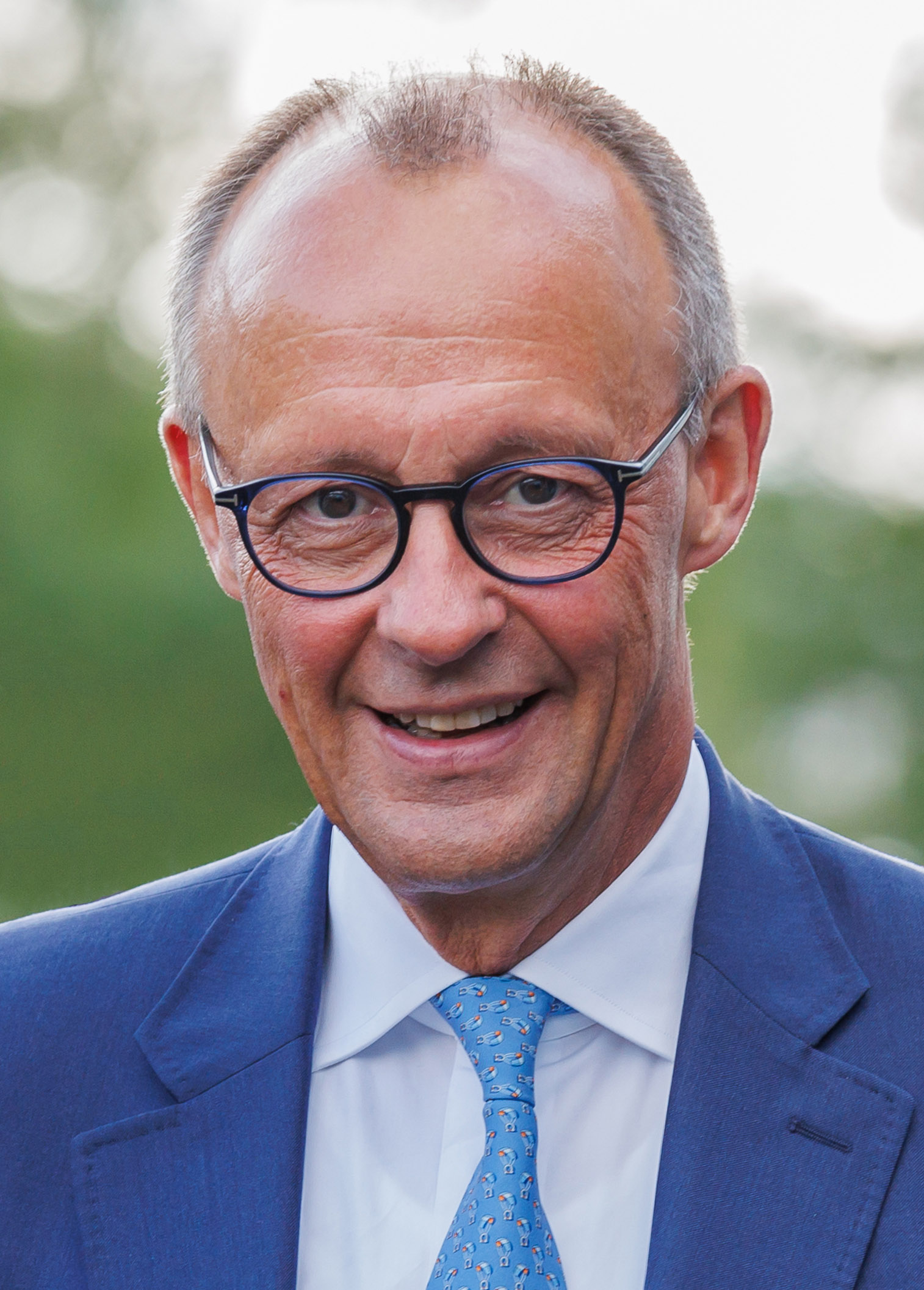

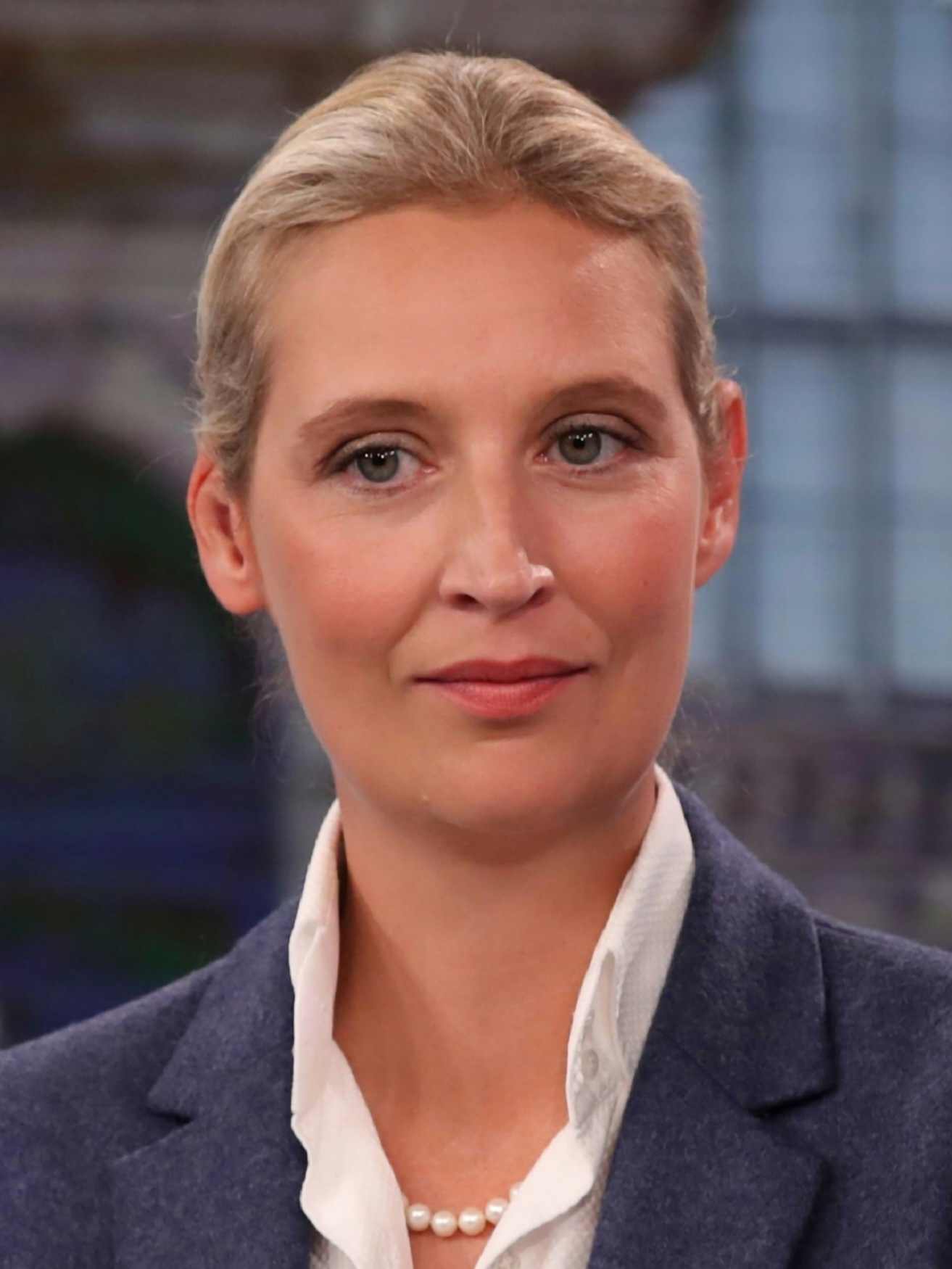

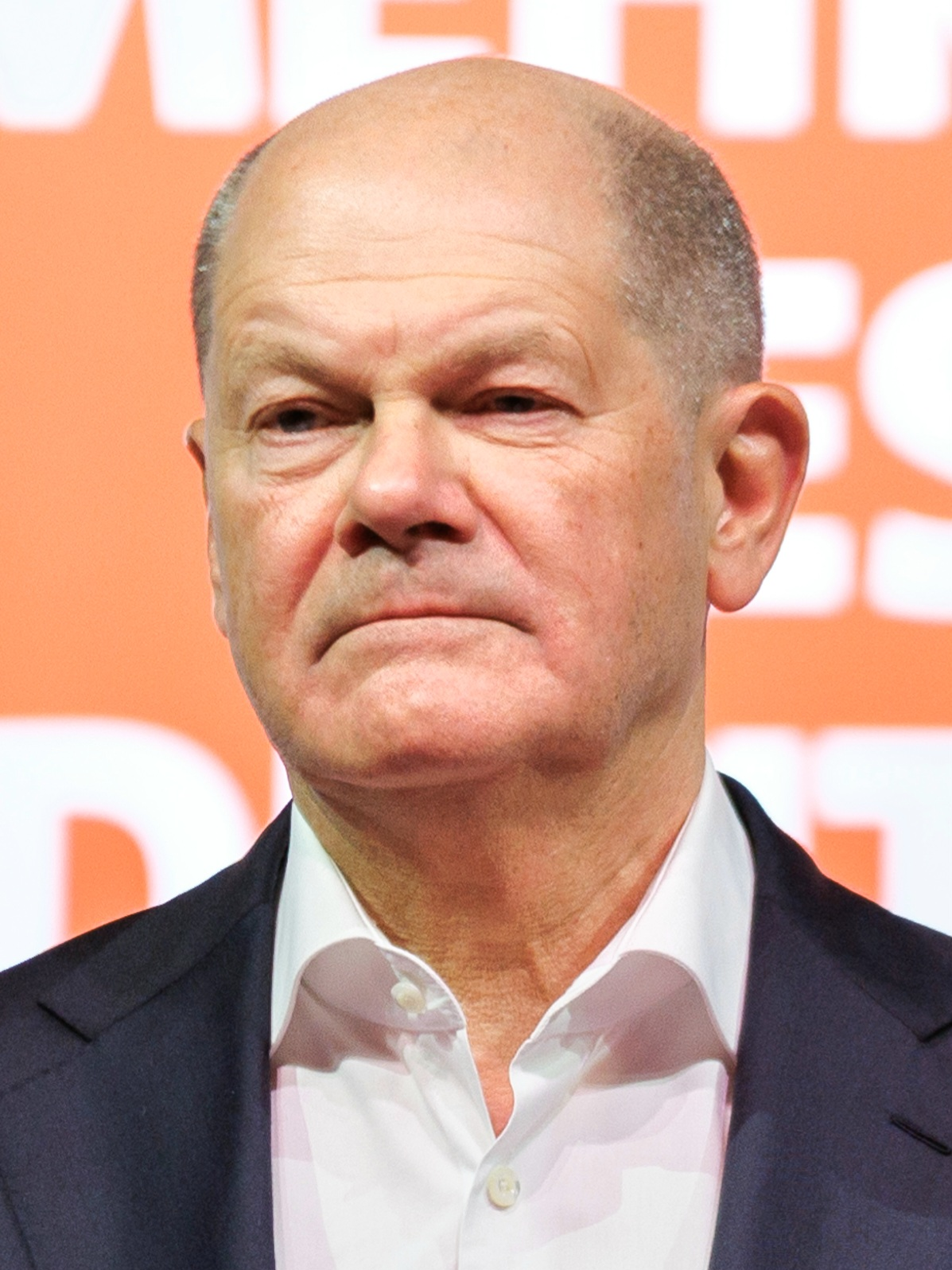

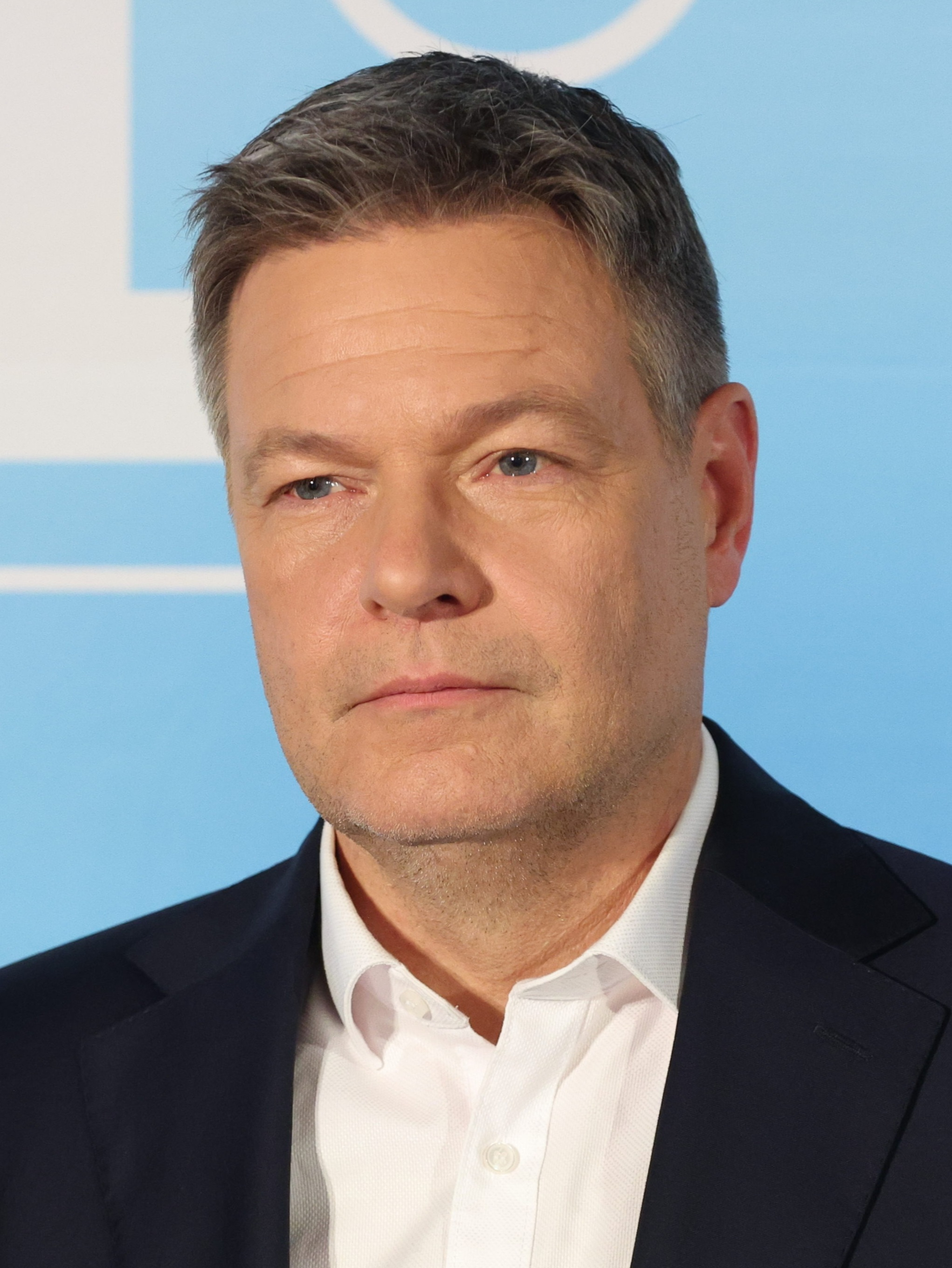

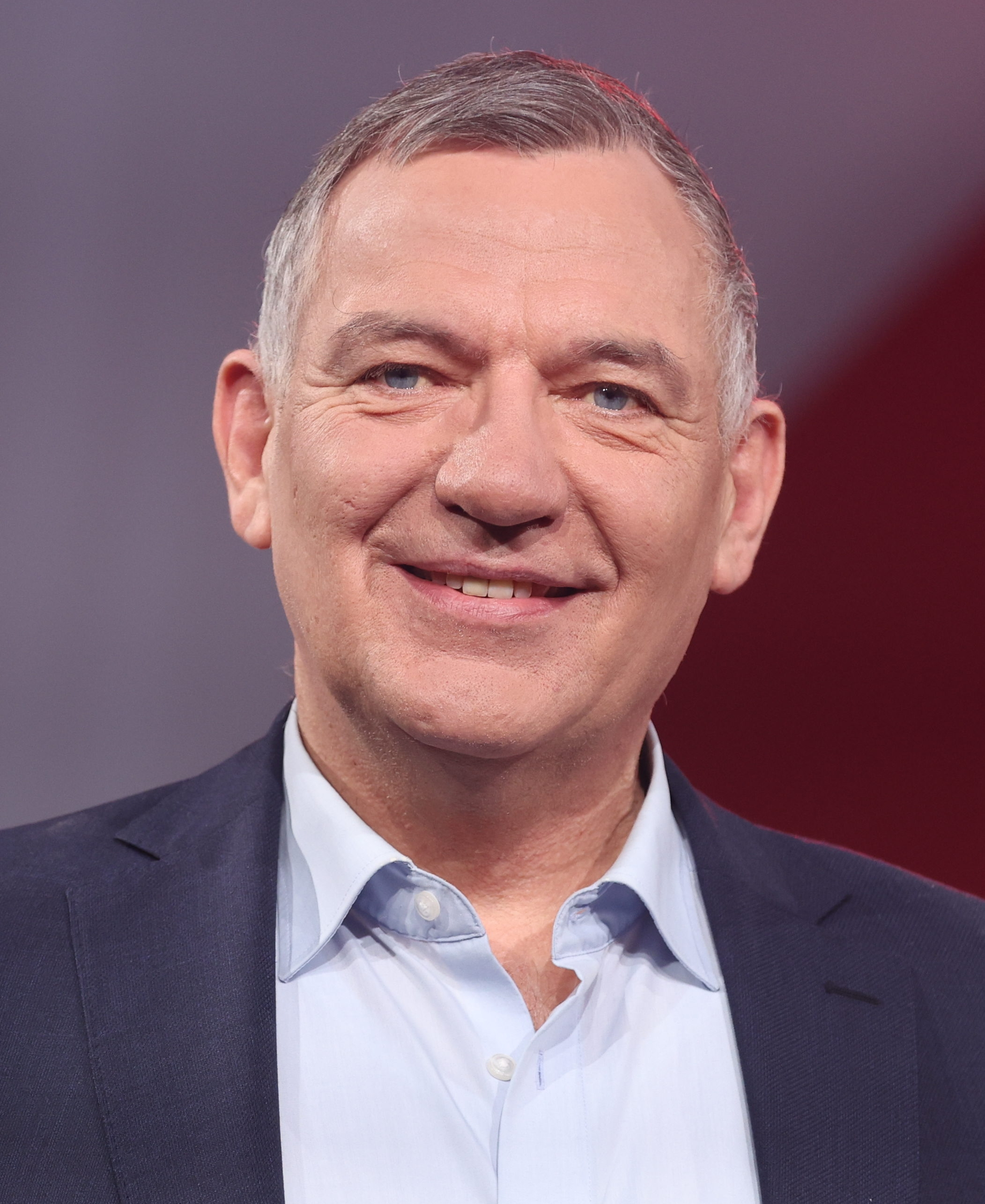

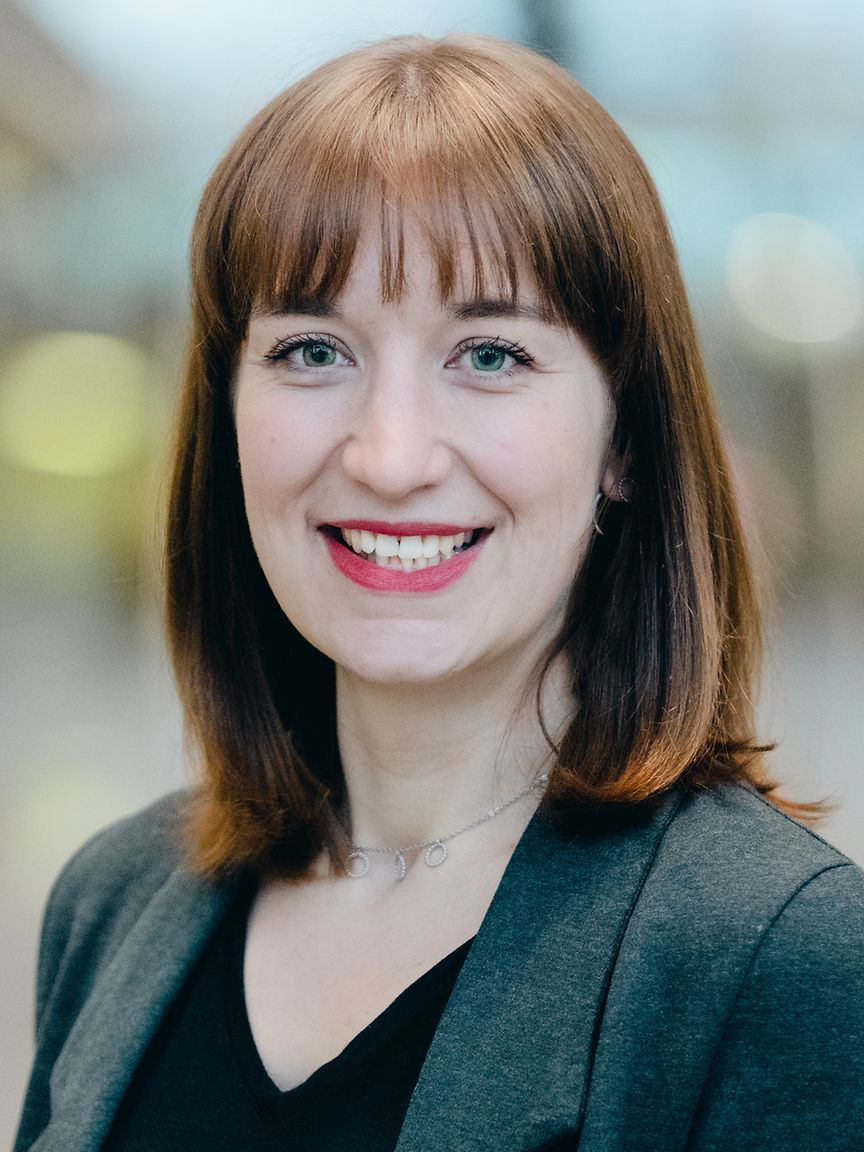

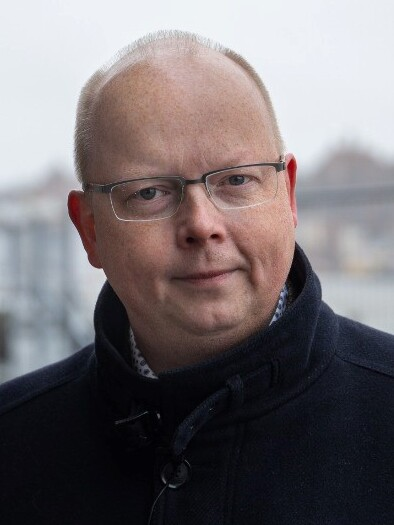

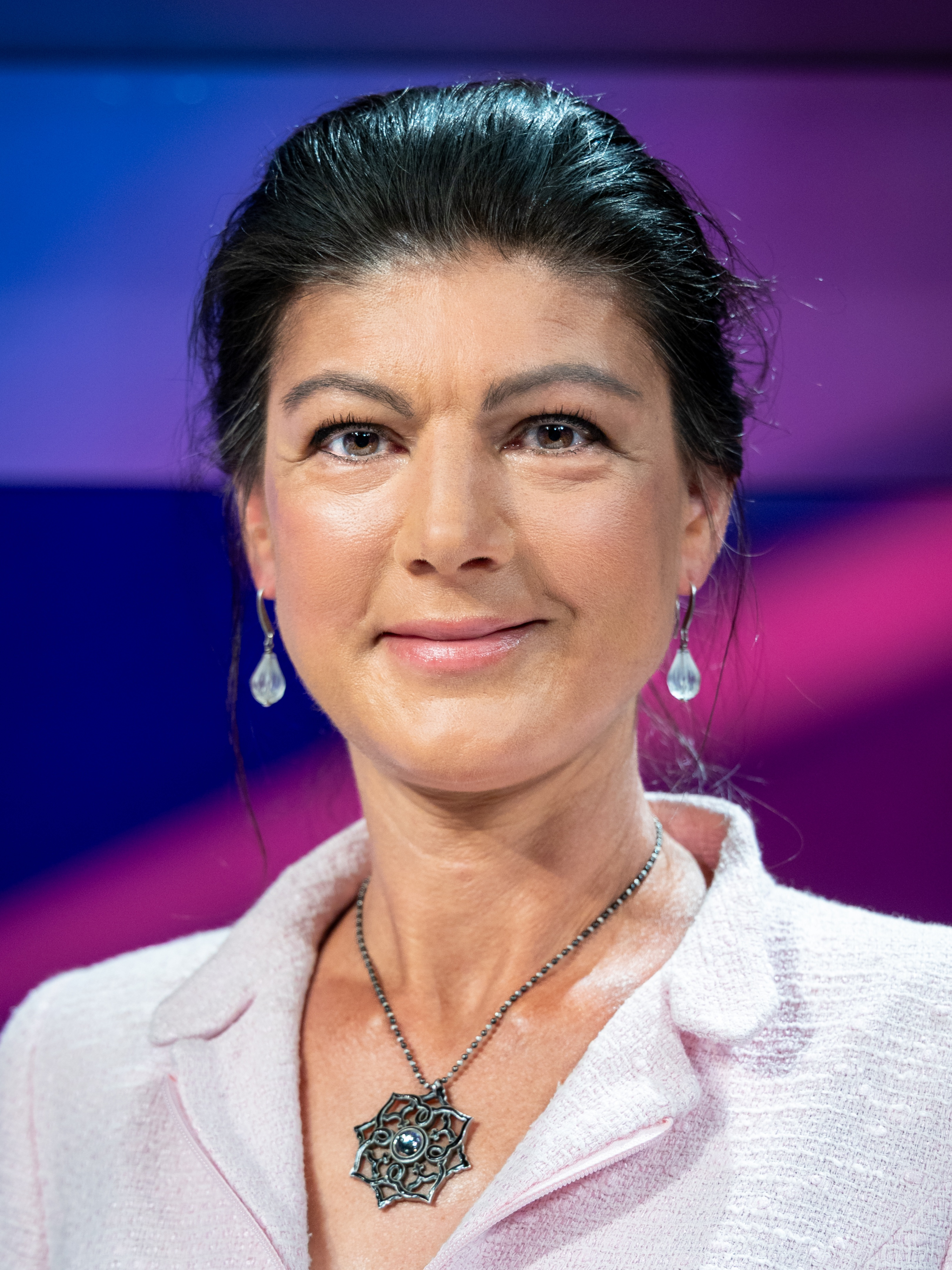

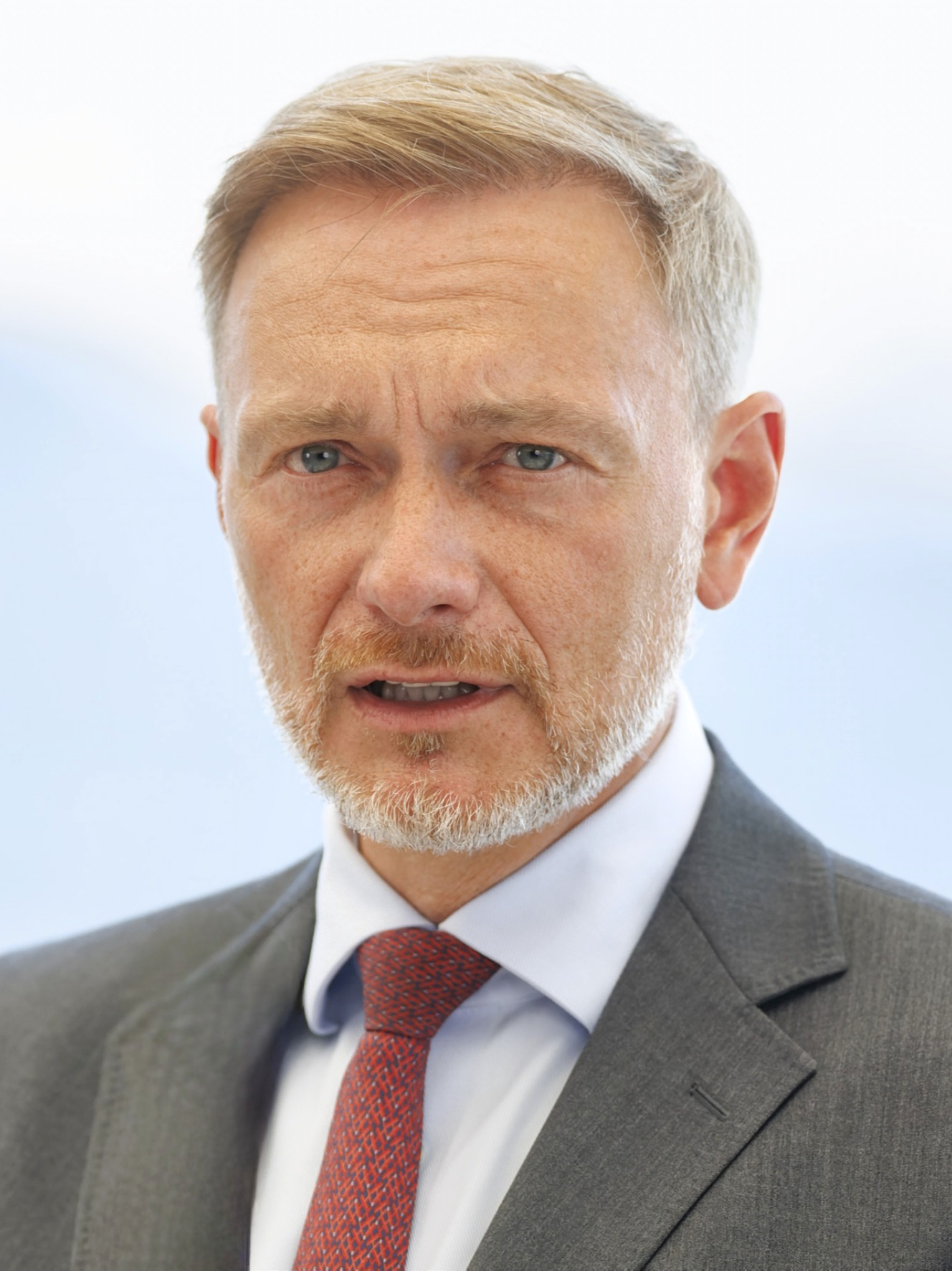
	First party	Second party	Third party
Candidate	Friedrich Merz	Alice Weidel (Note: Chancellor candidate; co-lead candidate with Tino Chrupalla.)	Olaf Scholz
Party	CDU/CSU	AfD	SPD
Last election	24.1%, 197 seats	10.4%, 83 seats	25.7%, 206 seats
Seats before	196	76	207
Seats won	208	152	120
Seat change	▲11	▲69	▼86
Popular vote	14,160,402	10,328,780	8,149,124
Percentage	28.5%	20.8%	16.4%
Swing	▲4.4 pp	▲10.4 pp	▼9.3 pp
	Fourth party	Fifth party	Sixth party
Candidate	Robert Habeck (Note: Chancellor candidate; co-lead candidate with Annalena Baerbock.)	Jan van Aken & Heidi Reichinnek	Stefan Seidler
Party	Greens	Die Linke	SSW
Last election	14.7%, 118 seats	4.9%, 39 seats	0.12%, 1 seat
Seats before	117	28	1
Seats won	85	64	1
Seat change	▼33	▲25	0
Popular vote	5,762,380	4,356,532	76,138
Percentage	11.6%	8.8%	0.15% (Note: Minority party exempt from 5% threshold.)
Swing	▼3.1 pp	▲3.9 pp	▲0.03 pp
	Seventh party	Eighth party
Candidate	Sahra Wagenknecht	Christian Lindner
Party	BSW	FDP
Last election	Did not exist	11.4%, 91 seats (Note: Initially allocated 92 seats in 2021, but lost a seat during repeat election in Berlin.)
Seats before	10 (Note: 10 MdBs were elected on lists of The Left in the previous election.)	90
Seats won	0	0
Seat change	New party	▼91
Popular vote	2,472,947	2,148,757
Percentage	4.98%	4.3%
Swing	New party	▼7.1 pp
- Results of the election. The main map shows constituency winners, and results for the proportional list seats are shown in the bottom left.
Government before election
Scholz cabinet
SPD–Green
Government after election
Merz cabinet
CDU/CSU–SPD

A federal election was held in Germany on 23 February 2025 to elect the 630 members of the 21st Bundestag, down from 736 in 2021 due to reforms in seat distribution. The 2025 election took place seven months ahead of schedule due to the 2024 collapse of the Scholz governing coalition. Following the loss of his majority, the chancellor called and intentionally lost a motion of confidence, which enabled the approval of a new election by the president. The 2025 election was the fourth snap election in post-war German history. (Note: after 1972, 1983, and 2005)

Three opposition parties increased their share of votes in the election, compared with the previous federal election in 2021. The conservative CDU/CSU alliance became the largest group in the Bundestag, with 28.5% of votes. Although this result was well below the 41.5% vote Angela Merkel had achieved in 2013 and its second-worst since 1949, it positioned the alliance to lead the new government. The far-right AfD, with 20.8%, doubled its share and achieved its best result in nationwide German elections, moving into second place but with no other party willing to work with it. The socialist Left party, polling well under 5% until January 2025, massively improved within a few weeks to 9%. On the other hand, the Sahra Wagenknecht Alliance (BSW), a populist splinter from the Left, fell in the polls, and at 4.98% narrowly failed to enter the Bundestag.

The three parties of the formerly governing "Traffic light coalition" all lost support. The centre-left Social Democratic Party (SPD) lost over nine percentage points and dropped to third rank with just 16.4%, its worst result since 1887. Its remaining junior partner, The Greens, also declined from 15% to 12%—which was, all the same, its second–best ever result. The Free Democratic Party (FDP), the departure of which from the government precipitated the election, recorded its worst ever result with 4.3%, and lost all representation in the Bundestag, as had previously happened in 2013. In total, 13.9% of voters are not represented in the 2025 Bundestag, the second highest percentage of forfeited second votes in German federal elections.

The South Schleswig Voters' Association (SSW), which as a party representing the Danish minority in Schleswig-Holstein is exempt from the 5% threshold, retained its single seat with 76,138 total votes (0.15%). Voter turnout was 82.5%, a six–percentage point increase from 2021, and the highest since German reunification.

CDU/CSU and SPD formerly had represented a two-party system with a combined approval of over 90% in the 1970s, and as late as 2017 had formed a grand coalition with 53% voter share. In 2025, they only received a combined 44.9% of the votes, but with only 86.1% of the voters being represented with seats, they still won a majority of 328 of 630 seats. After the election, the outgoing parliament continued sessions, and even changed the constitution, as the required majorities for that were not possible in the new 21st Bundestag which was assembled only on the last permitted date, on 25 March.

On 9 April 2025, the CDU/CSU and SPD secured a ruling coalition agreement. Friedrich Merz was elected as chancellor on 6 May 2025, with a majority of 325 out of 630. Earlier the same day, Merz had failed to be confirmed chancellor, with only 310 votes in the first round of voting, thus requiring a second round—a situation unprecedented in Germany's postwar history.

== Background ==
=== Date assignment ===
Germany's Basic Law and Federal Election Act provide that federal elections must be held on a Sunday or a national holiday (Note: In Germany, with the exception of the German Unity Day, all holidays are determined on the state level, and because of that, they do not necessarily apply for all German states. Currently, legal holidays in all states are New Year's Day, Good Friday, Easter Monday, Labour Day, Ascension Day, Whit Monday, German Unity Day, First Christmas Day, and Second Christmas Day (Boxing Day).) no earlier than 46 and no later than 48 months after the first sitting of a Bundestag unless the Bundestag is dissolved earlier. The 20th and sitting Bundestag held its first sitting on 26 October 2021. Therefore, the next regular election was to be held on a Sunday between 31 August 2025 and 26 October 2025. In August 2024, the Federal Cabinet initially recommended 28 September 2025 as the election date, which was approved by President Frank-Walter Steinmeier.

=== Snap election ===
Federal elections can be held earlier if the president dissolves the Bundestag and schedules a snap election. They may only do so under two scenarios described by the Basic Law:

1. After a federal election or any other vacancy in the chancellor's office, if the Bundestag fails to elect a chancellor with an absolute majority of its members by the 15th day after the first ballot, the president is free either to appoint the candidate who received a plurality of votes as chancellor or to dissolve the Bundestag (according to Article 63, Section 4).
2. If the chancellor proposes a motion of confidence that fails, they may ask the president to dissolve the Bundestag. The president can grant or deny the chancellor's request (according to Article 68).

Federal elections in Germany and governing coalitions since 1949. CDU/CSU and SPD used to be People's parties.

In both cases, federal elections would have to be held on a Sunday or national holiday no later than 60 days after the dissolution. (Note: Possibility 1 has not happened since 1949; possibility 2 has been used a total of four times (in 1972, 1982, 2005, and this election).)

On 6 November 2024, chancellor Olaf Scholz dismissed FDP leader Christian Lindner from the incumbent government. He did it during a government crisis, triggering the collapse of the traffic light coalition and leaving the government without a majority of Members of the Bundestag. On the same day, Chancellor Scholz announced he would submit a motion of confidence to hold a snap election. This was initially planned for January 2025 for a late March election but was brought forward after pressure from the opposition.

Scholz submitted a motion of confidence to the Bundestag on 11 December 2024; it was brought to a vote on 16 December. The motion required an absolute majority of 367 yes votes to pass. This was not achieved, with 207 yes votes, 394 no votes, 116 abstentions, and 16 absent or not voting. Of those members who were present and voting, the SPD group unanimously voted for confidence, while all opposition groups except for three members from the AfD voted against confidence. All Green members abstained to ensure the motion would fail without voting against its coalition.

After the vote's failure, Scholz went to Bellevue Palace to meet with President Steinmeier and recommend a dissolution. The governing parties and the CDU/CSU agreed that 23 February 2025 should be the date for the snap election. The president is not obliged to grant a dissolution, and the Basic Law allows him 21 days to decide. The president also has the sole authority to set the election date, though he agreed with the parties' proposal. Steinmeier first held discussions with all party leaders, as he has a constitutional duty to determine whether there is any possible majority in the current Bundestag. On 20 December, Steinmeier's office released a statement confirming that the talks were completed and that there was no possible majority. Steinmeier officially dissolved the Bundestag on 27 December, at the same time setting the election date as 23 February.

=== Electoral system ===
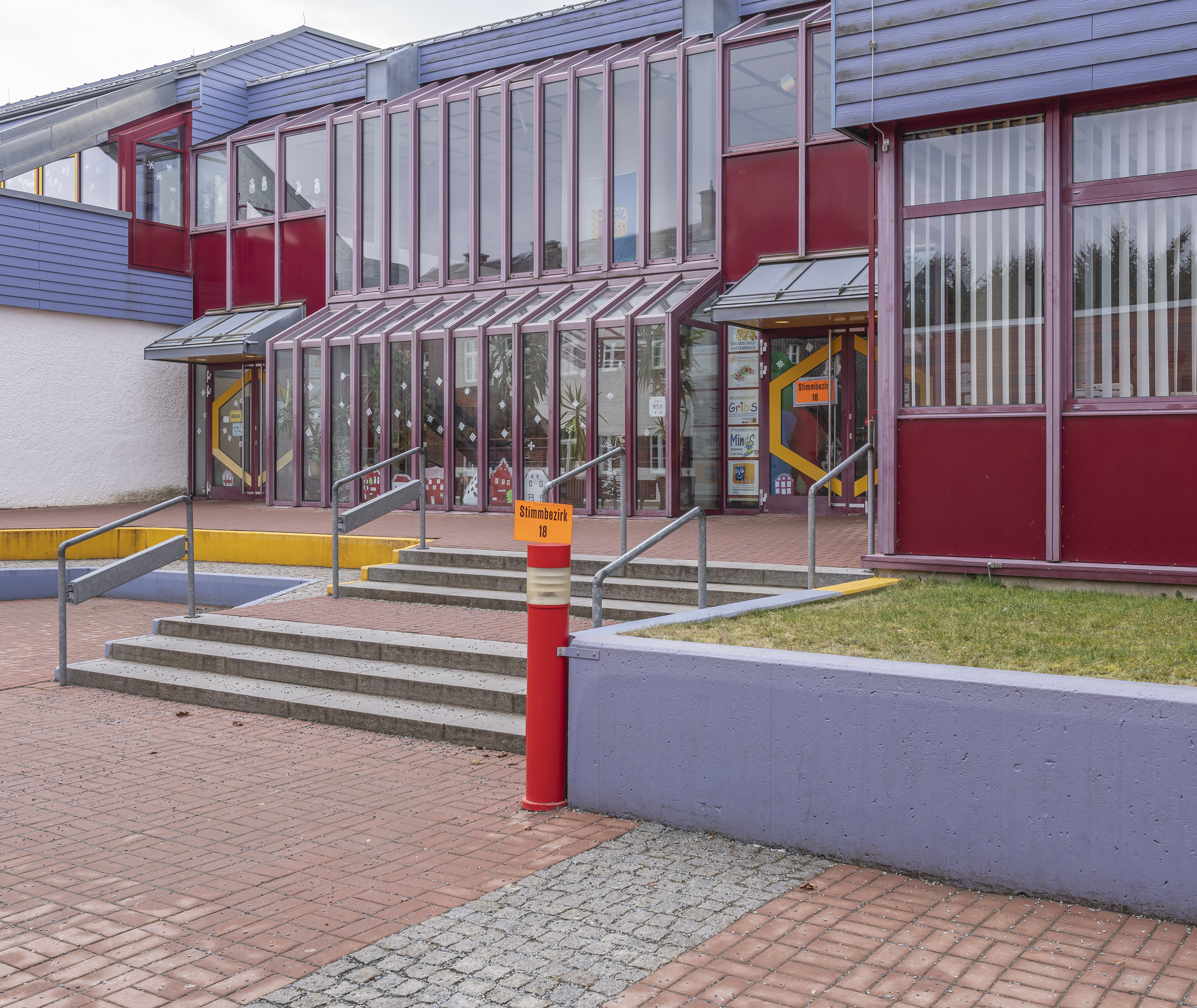
A school in Hof, Bavaria, used as a polling station for the 2025 election

Germany has a personalised proportional electoral system, allowing representation both of local interests (299 single-member constituencies) and proportions of the vote given at party level. Voters have two votes: the first for an individual constituency representative, and the second for a party list.

==== First vote ====
In the first vote, voters indicate their choice of a single candidate to represent their constituency. Results are calculated on the first-past-the-post method, i.e. the candidate receiving the most votes is considered the winner. Previous to the 2025 election, the winner in each constituency was automatically elected to the Bundestag.

==== Second vote ====
The second vote is the more significant one as voting for a party, more precisely the state-wide electoral list of that party, contributes to its national popularity share and is decisive for determining the partisan composition of the Bundestag. The number of second votes also determines the share of seats assigned to a state, as seats won by a party are proportionally distributed to each of its state lists.

To participate in the proportional allocation of seats, a party must either get five percent of the nationwide second vote or win three constituencies via first votes to pass the electoral threshold. Parties representing recognized minorities that contest federal elections, currently only the SSW, are exempt from the 5% threshold, but must still be proportionally entitled to a seat, in order to win representation.

Initially, in an overall distribution, all 630 seats (except those won by independent candidates) are allocated proportionally at the federal level to parties clearing the threshold, then subsequently to states, and within each party to its candidates in each state. Both calculations are done using the Webster/Sainte-Laguë method. The number of constituencies each party wins in each state is subtracted from its allocation to arrive at the final number of list seats. The list seats won by each party are allocated using state-wide electoral list closed lists drawn up by each party within each state.

Independent candidates are elected if they receive a plurality of the vote in their constituency. The second votes of ballots on which a winning independent candidate is the first vote are not considered in the proportional distribution of seats to preserve voter equality. However, these votes are considered when determining whether a party has exceeded the 5% threshold.

==== 2023 reform ====
Before the 2025 election, if a party won constituencies in a state exceeding its proportional entitlement, it could keep the so-called overhang seats, which consequently increase the size of the Bundestag. This problem was compounded by a 2008 ruling by the Federal Constitutional Court, and a subsequent electoral reform, which introduced leveling seats be added for other parties to keep the composition of the Bundestag proportional. Consequently, the 2017 and 2021 elections saw large numbers of additional seats.

After the 2021 election produced a Bundestag with 736 members – making it the largest freely elected parliament in the world – renewed debate began over the system that had been in place since the 2013 election. The Bundestag passed a reform law in March 2023 to fix the size of any future Bundestag at 630 members. It introduced two significant changes:

- The seat distribution would be determined solely through each party's share of the second vote (Zweitstimmendeckung, "second vote coverage")
- The three-constituency rule (Grundmandatsklausel, "basic mandate clause") was eliminated.

The principle of second vote coverage means that parties are no longer allowed to keep overhang seats; if a party wins overhang seats in a state, its constituency winners are excluded from the Bundestag in increasing order of their first vote share. The three-constituency rule stipulates that if a party does not pass the 5% threshold but wins a plurality of votes in 3 constituencies, it is eligible for list seats. If a party wins one or two constituencies but does not pass the threshold – a scenario which has only happened once, to the PDS in 2002 – those winners are also now excluded and not elected as they would lack second vote coverage. However, the principle does not apply for independent candidates. If an independent wins a constituency (which has not happened since 1949), the candidate is still elected.

Both the CSU and The Left opposed these changes. In the 2021 election, The Left fell short of the five percent threshold but remained as a faction in the Bundestag because it won three constituencies. In contrast, the CSU barely crossed the threshold with 5.2% of the nationwide second vote while winning 45 of the 46 constituencies in Bavaria. The CSU was also the only party to win overhang seats in that election. Both parties appealed to President Steinmeier to veto the proposed changes; nevertheless, Steinmeier signed the bill after his office concluded it was constitutional. Both party organizations and the government of Bavaria, controlled by the CSU, filed formal complaints to the Federal Constitutional Court.

Hearings were held on 23 and 24 April 2024. On 30 July 2024, the court largely upheld the new electoral law. However, it ruled that a five-percent threshold without any exceptions is unconstitutional; though it recognized the threshold is necessary to prevent fragmentation, it held there must be measures to minimize wasted votes. To settle electoral law in sufficient time for this election, as an interim measure, the court re-introduced the basic mandate clause as it was "until there is a new regulation on the matter." As such, a party getting a plurality of first votes in at least three constituencies would still enter the Bundestag, obtaining seats in proportion to its national second vote share.

== Political parties and candidates ==
The table below lists the parties represented in the 20th Bundestag that was elected in 2021.

Parties		Leader(s)	Leading candidate(s)	Ideology	Seats		Status
Parties		Leader(s)	Leading candidate(s)	Ideology	2021 election	At dissolution	Status
Social Democratic Party of Germany; Sozialdemokratische Partei Deutschlands		Saskia Esken; Lars Klingbeil	Olaf Scholz	Social democracy	206 / 736	207 / 733	Governing coalition
CDU/CSU	Christian Democratic Union of Germany; Christlich Demokratische Union Deutschlands	Friedrich Merz	Friedrich Merz	Christian democracy	152 / 736	153 / 733	Opposition
CDU/CSU	Christian Social Union in Bavaria; Christlich-Soziale Union in Bayern	Markus Söder	Friedrich Merz	Christian democracy Bavarian regionalism	45 / 736	43 / 733	Opposition
Alliance 90/The Greens; Bündnis 90/Die Grünen		Franziska Brantner; Felix Banaszak	Robert Habeck	Green liberalism	118 / 736	117 / 733	Governing coalition
Free Democratic Party; Freie Demokratische Partei		Christian Lindner	Christian Lindner	Liberalism	92 / 736	90 / 733	Opposition. Previously in coalition
Alternative for Germany; Alternative für Deutschland		Alice Weidel; Tino Chrupalla	Alice Weidel	Völkisch nationalism	83 / 736	76 / 733	Opposition
The Left; Die Linke		Ines Schwerdtner; Jan van Aken	Heidi Reichinnek; Jan van Aken	Democratic socialism	39 / 736	28 / 733	Opposition
Sahra Wagenknecht Alliance; Bündnis Sahra Wagenknecht		Sahra Wagenknecht; Amira Mohamed Ali	Sahra Wagenknecht	Left-conservatism	0 / 736	10 / 733	Opposition
Ungrouped	South Schleswig Voters' Association; Südschleswigscher Wählerverband	Christian Dirschauer	Stefan Seidler	Danish minority interests Frisian minority interests	1 / 736	1 / 733	Opposition
Ungrouped	Alliance Germany; Bündnis Deutschland	Steffen Grosse	—	Conservatism; Liberal conservatism	0 / 736	1 / 733 (Note: Uwe Witt left AfD in December 2021 and ultimately joined BD in December 2024.)	Opposition
Ungrouped	Values Union; WerteUnion	Hans-Georg Maaßen	—	Economic liberalism Right-wing populism	0 / 736	1 / 733 (Note: Dirk Spaniel left AfD in October 2024 and joined WU in January 2025.)	Opposition
Ungrouped	Independent	—	—	—	0 / 736	5 / 733 (Note: Matthias Helferich, though elected on AfD's North Rhine-Westphalia list, was excluded from its parliamentary group due to controversial statements. Joana Cotar, Robert Farle, Johannes Huber, and Thomas Seitz left AfD at various points during the legislative session to sit as independents.)	Opposition
Ungrouped	Independent	—	—	—	0 / 736	1 / 733	Governing coalition (Note: Volker Wissing left the FDP to remain in the Scholz cabinet as Minister of Digital and Transport as well as taking over the post of Minister of Justice from his former colleague.)

=== Nominations and lead candidates ===
In contrast to the 2021 election, the Kanzlerfrage (chancellor question) for the CDU/CSU was resolved relatively quickly. After good performances for the CDU in the September 2024 state elections in Saxony and Thuringia, the two other prospective candidates – North Rhine-Westphalia Minister-President Hendrik Wüst and Bavaria Minister-President and CSU leader Markus Söder – expressed their full support for Friedrich Merz. Söder was thought to pursue another attempt at the nomination; many CDU rank-and-file, however, saw him in a negative light after a months-long battle with Armin Laschet for the nomination in 2021, followed by personal attacks on Laschet that were seen as undermining the Union campaign, as well as his categorical ruling-out of any coalition with the Greens after this election. (The CSU has only provided the Union's lead candidate twice: in 1980 and 2002.)

At The Left's party convention in October, former lead candidate Gregor Gysi announced an effort called Mission Silberlocke ("Mission Silver Locks") to bolster the party's prospects in the face of infighting and faltering polling. Gysi committed to run for re-election in his constituency of Berlin-Treptow – Köpenick, with former parliamentary group leader Dietmar Bartsch running for a third time in Rostock – Landkreis Rostock II and former Minister-President of Thuringia Bodo Ramelow – the only Left member to have led a state government – contesting a Bundestag seat for the first time since 2005 in Erfurt – Weimar – Weimarer Land II. The goal is to capitalize on the three men's relatively high personal popularities and give The Left the best chance to win three constituencies and ensure they remain in the Bundestag. The effort is nicknamed in humorous reference to their advanced ages. Party co-leader Ines Schwerdtner is also running to replace the retiring longtime MdB Gesine Lötzsch in the stronghold of Berlin-Lichtenberg, and parliamentary co-leader Sören Pellmann is seeking re-election in Leipzig II, which are both seen as likely holds for The Left. Experts also rated Gysi and Ramelow as favorites to win their respective constituencies, which combined would retain the party's representation. Jan van Aken was elected party co-chair alongside Schwerdtner on the same day; however, in November, van Aken and parliamentary co-leader Heidi Reichinnek were selected as The Left's dual lead candidacy for the campaign.

In November, various SPD legislators and leading figures – most prominently former party leader Sigmar Gabriel – began publicly calling for Defence Minister Boris Pistorius to be designated the party's chancellor candidate owing to its and Scholz's poor polling. Polling for ARD showed Pistorius as the most favorably viewed national politician: 60% of voters thought he would be a good chancellor, compared to 42% for Merz and 21% for Scholz. In a video released on 21 November, Pistorius ended two weeks of public debate by disavowing any interest in running for chancellor and expressing his full support for Scholz. Such a protracted and public debate, and party leadership's apparent inability to quickly control or restrain it, was seen as embarrassing and damaging; Jusos President Philipp Türmer directly called out party leaders Saskia Esken and Lars Klingbeil for the "shitshow" at their national congress the following weekend. Nonetheless, Scholz was unanimously renominated as chancellor candidate by the party's executive, a group which includes Pistorius, on 25 November. Scholz's nomination was confirmed at a party congress on 11 January; as is usual for sitting chancellors, the vote was by acclamation rather than secret ballot, and he received little opposition.

On 17 November, the Greens nominated sitting vice chancellor Robert Habeck as its chancellor candidate. Habeck and foreign minister Annalena Baerbock remain their co-lead candidates, though Baerbock was the chancellor candidate in 2021. Habeck's campaign does not use the term chancellor candidate and instead refers to him as a "Candidate for the people in Germany" (Kandidat für die Menschen in Deutschland). However, the media uses the usual term.

On 7 December, the AfD executive nominated Alice Weidel as its chancellor candidate. This is the first time the party has referred to its leader as a chancellor candidate (Kanzlerkandidat). This term is normally reserved for the parties (SPD, Greens, and CDU/CSU) seen as having a realistic chance of becoming a senior coalition partner and providing a chancellor instead of the term lead candidate (Spitzenkandidat/in) used for smaller parties. Because other parties refuse to work with it, its chances of entering government are unlikely.

The BSW also nominated Sahra Wagenknecht as a chancellor candidate on 16 December. General Secretary Christian Heye flatly conceded that the party, polling between four and eight percent at the time, had no chance of providing a chancellor and said: "We are neither imagining things nor are we megalomaniacal." He blamed the "inflation" of the term's usage in forcing their hand; he further noted that parties without a Chancellor candidate faced disadvantages, such as no invitations to certain televised debates (most of which were held only between formal Chancellor candidates).

=== Competing parties ===
A total of 41 parties have been approved to run in this election. A special case is "the Union" in which, due to a parallel development after World War II, the Christian Social Union in Bavaria (CSU) only competes in Bavaria while the Christian Democratic Union of Germany (CDU) runs in all states except Bavaria. Since the late 1940s, the CDU and CSU form a long-standing alliance of conservative parties in Germany. Both parties always have a joint leading candidate and have a joint parliamentary group in the Bundestag, the CDU/CSU. Both parties run separately, though, and CSU has to pass the nationwide 5% threshold by itself. Their results are usually shown in added form after elections and in polls.

Automatic nationwide approval is granted to so-called "established parties": those that have been continuously represented in the Bundestag with at least five members since the previous election (SPD, CDU and CSU, Greens, FDP, AfD, and Left) or those that have been continuously represented in any state parliament with at least five members since that state's last election (Alliance Germany, BSW, and Free Voters). These parties also do not need to submit signatures to support their nominations.

Other political organizations constitute "non-established parties" and must petition the Federal Electoral Committee for approval to run in the election. The committee must determine whether these organizations meet the definition of a political party set forth by section 2 of the Political Parties Act: that it desires to influence politics and obtain parliamentary representation "either permanently or for an extended period", and in particular, that its "scope and stability...its number of members, and public profile provide sufficient guarantees of the seriousness of this objective". In addition, most of its members and board of directors must be German citizens, based in and managed from within the country.

Thirty-one parties were approved but must submit signatures to support their nominations. Constituency nominations require 200 signatures of eligible voters residing within its boundaries. The number of signatures needed to file a state list is set at 0.1% of the state's eligible voting population at the previous election, with a maximum of 2,000. The 2023 electoral reform law added the restriction that parties can only run constituency candidates in states where it has a state list.

The committee also determined the validity of a party's claim to represent a recognized minority, which not only exempts them from the five-percent hurdle but also the requirement to submit signatures. The SSW's claim was approved, while the claim of Die Sonstigen ("The Others") was not approved.

On 22 January, Table.Media reported that an FDP member submitted complaints against the validity of 14 of the party's state lists (in all states except Berlin and Lower Saxony), alleging that voting on nominations was not conducted by secret ballot as required by federal law. Instead of filling out a pre-printed ballot, delegates wrote "yes", "no", "abstention", or a candidate's name on a blank sheet of paper while in their seats, which the complaint argued could lead to the ballot being seen by others or the delegate being identified by their handwriting. The electoral committees of several states confirmed they were investigating a complaint, while federal party leaders denied any laws were broken. All of the FDP's lists were ultimately approved. The state returning officer of Hesse, in calling the complaint "far-fetched", pointed to a 2017 court case that found that a minimum level of secrecy (e.g., getting up from one's seat or covering one's ballot with a hand) is sufficient in internal party votes.

Ultimately, 29 of the 41 parties approved to run in the election submitted a valid state list in at least one state. In the table below, green indicates a party's state list has been approved, while red indicates a state list has been rejected. The number in each box indicates how many direct candidates the party ran in the indicated state. Parties are ordered by their results in the 2021 election, then alphabetically.

Party		State															
Party		BW	BY	BE	BB	HB	HH	HE	MV	NI	NW	RP	SL	SN	ST	SH	TH
1	Social Democratic Party of Germany (SPD)	38	47	12	10	2	6	22	6	30	64	15	4	16	8	11	8
2	Christian Democratic Union of Germany (CDU)	38	–	12	10	2	6	22	6	30	64	15	4	16	8	11	8
3	Alliance 90/The Greens (GRÜNE)	37	47	12	8	2	6	22	6	30	64	15	4	16	8	11	8
4	Free Democratic Party (FDP)	38	47	12	10	2	6	22	6	30	64	15	4	16	8	11	8
5	Alternative for Germany (AfD)	38	45	12	10	2	6	22	6	30	62	15	4	16	8	11	8
6	Christian Social Union in Bavaria (CSU)	–	47	–	–	–	–	–	–	–	–	–	–	–	–	–	–
7	The Left (Die Linke)	38	47	12	10	2	6	22	6	29	63	15	4	16	8	11	8
8	Free Voters (FREIE WÄHLER)	37	47	7	10	1	6	22	6	26	47	15	4	14	8	11	7
9	Human Environment Animal Protection Party (Tierschutzpartei)	4	11	5	Rej.	–	–	1	1	2	–	3	–	–	Rej.	Rej.	Rej.
10	Grassroots Democratic Party of Germany (dieBasis)	10	12	Rej.	Rej.	Rej.	–	Rej.	Rej.	–	3	Rej.	Rej.	Rej.	Rej.	Rej.	–
11	Die PARTEI (Die PARTEI)	11	6	4	5	1	–	4	–	3	12	1	–	6	2	1	–
12	Team Todenhöfer (Team Todenhöfer)	Rej.	–	2	–	–	–	Rej.	–	–	4	–	–	–	–	–	–
13	Pirate Party Germany (PIRATEN)	Rej.	Rej.	Rej.	–	Rej.	Rej.	Rej.	Rej.	3	Rej.	–	–	–	Rej.	–	Rej.
14	Volt Germany (Volt)	29	35	–	5	2	3	19	–	21	32	13	–	5	–	11	–
15	Ecological Democratic Party (ÖDP)	2	30	Rej.	–	–	–	Rej.	–	–	Rej.	4	Rej.	Rej.	–	–	Rej.
16	South Schleswig Voters' Association (SSW)	–	–	–	–	–	–	–	–	–	–	–	–	–	–	5	–
17	Party for Rejuvenation Research (Verjüngungsforschung)	–	Rej.	–	–	–	–	–	–	–	–	–	–	–	–	–	–
18	Party of Humanists (PdH)	Rej.	2	Rej.	–	–	–	–	–	–	Rej.	Rej.	–	3	–	–	–
19	Alliance C – Christians for Germany (Bündnis C)	1	–	–	–	–	–	Rej.	–	–	Rej.	–	–	Rej.	–	–	–
20	Bavaria Party (BP)	–	6	–	–	–	–	–	–	–	–	–	–	–	–	–	–
21	Marxist–Leninist Party of Germany (MLPD)	15	4	5	–	2	5	6	2	5	16	–	1	3	2	1	6
22	Human World (Menschliche Welt)	–	–	–	–	–	–	–	–	–	–	–	–	–	–	–	–
23	Party of Progress (PdF)	Rej.	–	–	Rej.	Rej.	–	–	–	Rej.	2	Rej.	–	–	–	–	Rej.
24	Socialist Equality Party (SGP)	–	–	1	–	–	–	–	–	–	–	–	–	–	–	–	–
25	Civil Rights Movement Solidarity (BüSo)	–	–	4	–	–	–	–	–	–	–	–	–	–	–	–	–
26	Alliance Germany (BÜNDNIS DEUTSCHLAND)	5	12	11	2	2	–	4	3	5	15	5	–	11	4	4	–
27	Sahra Wagenknecht Alliance (BSW)	–	5	4	–	–	–	–	–	–	1	10	–	7	–	–	8
28	MERA25 (MERA25)	Rej.	Rej.	1	Rej.	–	Rej.	Rej.	–	Rej.	–	–	–	Rej.	–	–	–
29	Values Union (WerteUnion)	–	Rej.	Rej.	–	–	–	–	Rej.	Rej.	5	–	–	–	–	–	–
Non-party candidates		5	8	4	4	1	–	5	2	7	10	1	–	3	4	3	5

== Campaign ==
=== FDP "D-Day" paper ===
On 15 November 2024, the newspapers Die Zeit and Süddeutsche Zeitung independently reported that the collapse of the traffic light coalition on 6 November was the result of a deliberate strategy in which the FDP had been planning its exit from the alliance for several weeks. They reported on the existence of a detailed working paper that used controversial militaristic language: the 18-page economic report that resulted in Lindner's firing was called "the torpedo", and the upcoming election campaign was described as an "open battle". Most contentious was that the day of the report's publication was referred to as "D-Day" – which in German is used exclusively to refer to the Allied invasion of Normandy and has a violent connotation. Using the language of war to refer to the political process led to heavy criticism.

This also contradicted Lindner's assertion that the end of the government was a "calculated break" on the part of Scholz. Criticism came from the SPD upon the revelation that their coalition partner had not acted in good faith for weeks: parliamentary leader Rolf Mützenich described himself as "feeling deceived and disappointed" and "horrified" by the controversial language. In an 18 November interview with RTL and n-tv, FDP General Secretary Bijan Djir-Sarai denied using the term "D-Day" and stated the party's leadership was unaware of the paper. Lindner did not deny the paper's existence but replied to reporters: "We are in a campaign. Where is the news here?"

Media speculation continued as to what degree the FDP was responsible for the coalition's end. On the morning of 28 November, the online news portal Table.Media published excerpts of an eight-page document alleged to be the working paper; it was indeed titled "D-Day Scenarios and Actions" and laid out a strategy as detailed as the original reporting surmised, including strategies to undermine the coalition, communication tactics, and pre-written quotations for Lindner. SZ confronted party leaders with the excerpts and gave them a 1:30 p.m. deadline to respond to questions. The party did not, but instead officially released the full paper at 6 p.m. with a statement from Djir-Sarai claiming it was "to prevent false impressions ... of the paper" by the media.

According to the party, the paper was first prepared by Federal Managing Director Carsten Reymann on 24 October "to deal with the questions surrounding how the exit of the FDP from the government could be communicated", and the "purely technical paper" was not presented to legislators or government members. Djir-Sarai and Reymann resigned the next day to take responsibility for the paper's contents. SPD acting general secretary Matthias Miersch described Djir-Sarai as "a transparent scapegoat" to protect Lindner and called it "unimaginable" that the party leader would not know of the paper's existence. In a written statement released that evening, Lindner again denied any knowledge of the paper and stated he would not have approved of it and that it was only circulated among internal party staffers and not any elected officials.

Marco Buschmann, who served as justice minister until the traffic light coalition's collapse, was appointed to succeed Djir-Sarai as general secretary of the FDP on 1 December.

=== Party manifestos and policies ===
The political parties released manifestos. The CDU proposed support for Ukraine. The FDP proposed pension reform. The Greens proposed support for immigrants. Die Linke proposed a return to their roots of democratic socialism following the Sahra Wagenknecht Alliance split, mainly through increased taxes on the rich to fund rent caps and energy subsidies. Wind energy has been a policy.

=== Debates and interviews ===
Immediately after the confidence vote's failure, public broadcasters ARD and ZDF announced their plans to hold two debates featuring chancellor candidates from four parties. Scholz and Merz were invited to a debate on 9 February, while Habeck and Weidel were invited to a separate face-off on 10 February. This represented a change from the 2021 campaign, when ARD and ZDF held a three-way debate between the Union, SPD and Green chancellor candidates. Representatives of AfD and the Greens complained about their candidates' exclusions and claimed the public broadcasters had been biased in their decision. Habeck's campaign spokesperson announced he would decline the invitation and accused ARD and ZDF of "intervening" in the campaign in favor of the two established parties. Weidel's spokesperson demanded her inclusion in a three-way debate based on the AfD's second place in opinion polls and said the party was reviewing legal action against the broadcasters. Lindner and Wagenknecht offered to take Habeck's place in the second debate.

On 18 December, Table.Media reported that Scholz had agreed to participate in the ARD–ZDF debate on the condition that he would face off only against Merz, which was accepted by the public broadcasters. Green chief whip Irene Mihalic demanded an explanation from the broadcasters. An ARD spokesperson denied the report and claimed there was no influence by politicians or conditions involved in the decision. According to the spokesperson, the two-way debate would feature the incumbent and the challenger with the best chances to succeed him. Habeck declined his invitation in writing to ARD on 20 December, and the broadcasters cancelled the planned second debate.

The broadcasters also announced plans for two further four-way interview programmes. Scholz, Merz, Habeck and Weidel would separately face questions from an audience in two programmes to be held on 13 and 17 February. They will also preside over their usual "closing roundtable" (Schlussrunde) with the leaders of all parties currently represented in the Bundestag on 20 February.

RTL also announced plans for a debate between Merz and Scholz on the Sunday before the proposed election date. The channel ultimately plans two additional head-to-head debates between other parties' leading candidates on the same night. A spokesperson for the broadcaster said: "We are convinced that one debate with the current five chancellor candidates would be nothing more than a talk show". The Left, which was not invited, stated it was considering legal action against its omission. RTL claimed in a statement that The Left had not been invited due to trailing in opinion polls behind the other parties.

Axel Springer SE media brands Welt and Bild announced a joint debate between Scholz and Merz to be held on 19 February, the last Wednesday before the election.

ProSiebenSat.1 Media was the final major broadcaster to announce a debate or interview program, scheduling what it calls "citizen speed dating" on the night before the election. Ten voters are given three minutes each to ask the four leading candidates their questions.

2025 German federal election debates and interviews
Date	Broadcasters	P Present S Surrogate I Invited NI Not invited N Not present								
Date	Broadcasters	CDU	SPD	Greens	AfD	FDP	Left	CSU	BSW	FW
28 January 2025 (Note: Not a debate; the candidates separately answer questions posed by a live audience in a town hall format)	ZDF national-public	P Frei	P Klingbeil	P Baerbock	P Weidel	P Lindner	P van Aken	P Dobrindt	P Wagenknecht	NI
6 February 2025	ZDF national-public	NI	NI	P Banaszak	S Chrupalla	P Lindner	P van Aken	P Dobrindt	P Wagenknecht	NI
9 February 2025	ARD, ZDF national-public	P Merz	P Scholz	NI	NI	NI	NI	NI	NI	NI
10 February 2025	ARD national-public	NI	NI	NI	NI	P Lindner	P van Aken	P Bär	P Wagenknecht	NI
12 February 2025 (Note: Regional lead candidates)	BR regional-public (Bavaria)	NI	NI	NI	P Protschka	NI	P Gürpinar	NI	P Ernst	P Aiwanger
12 February 2025	MDR regional-public (Central Germany)	P Müller	P Schneider	P Lemke	P Chrupalla	P Herbst	P Ramelow	NI	P Lüders	NI
12 February 2025	SWR regional-public (Southwest Germany)	P Warken	P Schmid	P Brantner	P Frohnmaier	P Skudelny	P Mirow	NI	P Tatti	NI
13 February 2025	ZDF national-public	P Merz	P Scholz	P Habeck	P Weidel	NI	NI	NI	NI	NI
16 February 2025	RTL, n-tv national-commercial	P Merz	P Scholz	P Habeck	P Weidel	NI	NI	NI	NI	NI
17 February 2025	ARD national-public	P Merz	P Scholz	P Habeck	P Weidel	NI	NI	NI	NI	NI
19 February 2025	Welt national-commercial	P Merz	P Scholz	NI	NI	NI	NI	NI	NI	NI
20 February 2025	ARD, ZDF national-public	S Linnemann	S Miersch	S Baerbock	P Weidel	P Lindner	P van Aken	P Dobrindt	P Wagenknecht	NI
22 February 2025 (Note: Pre-recorded.)	Sat.1, ProSieben national-commercial	N Merz	P Scholz	P Habeck	P Weidel	NI	NI	NI	NI	NI

=== Possible coalitions ===
A renewal of the outgoing traffic light coalition was not deemed desirable by any of the three parties. Lindner of the FDP categorically disavowed any prospects of his party joining such a coalition in November following his removal from the government if his party entered the Bundestag again.

A government led by the CDU/CSU was seen as most likely, given it held a large polling lead. Merz was seen as willing to discuss a coalition with the SPD, FDP and Greens; however, CSU leader Söder has openly refused to enter a government with the Greens. Representatives of both parties have stated that a black–green coalition would be difficult to manage. A fifth grand coalition in Germany's history between the CDU and SPD can thus be considered the most realistic outcome of government formation. Such a coalition was also preferred by the voters, being the most popular government arrangement in opinion polling. However, Söder stipulated that he would only support the black-red alliance so long as incumbent SPD chancellor Scholz is not included in the next cabinet. Scholz indicated his intention to step down from leadership post-election and be uninvolved in coalition formation, paving the way for negotiations on a grand coalition.

FDP leader Lindner had indicated his desire to form a government with the CDU/CSU, a frequent coalition throughout modern German history and last represented in the second Merkel cabinet. Merz stated that only if the FDP's polling figures increased to six or seven percent would "a stable majority be in reach". FDP Bundestag Vice-president Wolfgang Kubicki has supported a black-red-yellow "Germany coalition", including the SPD. The FDP failed to reach the 5% necessary for Bundestag representation, and discussions on the idea were rendered moot.

Difficulty in predicting coalitions before the elections came due to the fact that the BSW, FDP, and Linke were all polling around 5% shortly before the election, while the Free Voters were well below 5%. In the end, only Linke of the four smaller parties made it into the Bundestag, meaning that coalition formation could mathematically result in a grand coalition.

==== Firewall and alleged Union-AfD cooperation ====
The CDU, SPD, Greens and FDP all refuse to form a coalition including the BSW on the federal level, despite the SPD-BSW coalition (Red–purple coalition) in office in Brandenburg and a CDU-SPD-BSW coalition (blackberry coalition) in Thuringia.

All other parties also refuse to form a coalition with or cooperate with the AfD. The CDU has passed a "resolution of incompatibility" regarding the AfD and The Left, prohibiting cooperation with either party at the federal level; the FDP will also not work with The Left.

Following a stabbing attack in Aschaffenburg on 22 January, in which a rejected Afghan asylum seeker killed two people, Merz announced that the Union would introduce two non-binding resolutions on migration policy and homeland security to the Bundestag, appealing to SPD and Green lawmakers for their support. Despite high-ranking members of both parties rejecting these initiatives, Merz's "five-point plan" on migration was adopted on 29 January with votes from the Union, FDP and AfD, marking a historic first on the federal level. Lawmakers from the SPD, Greens and Left Party strongly criticized Merz for his alleged cooperation with the AfD, which the Union denied; Catholic, Protestant and Jewish representatives and retired CDU chancellor Angela Merkel voiced similar concerns. Following the vote, hundreds of thousands of protesters attended demonstrations against Merz's decisions across Germany. Subsequently, a similar bill proposed by the Union to limit migrant intake was defeated in the Bundestag on 31 January, despite the AfD's support.

While the debate on the cordon sanitaire dominated political discourse the following weeks, Politbarometer data suggested popular opinion to be split evenly between approval and criticism of Merz's course of action, resulting in no major polling shifts.

=== Target seats ===
To repeat the wins that saved their 2021 result, The Left announced Mission Silberlocke (Mission Silver Locks), in which popular party veterans ran in three districts, also aiming to achieve full representation for the party through the Grundmandatsklausel. Due to a last month surge in popularity mainly among young people, The Left won well over 5% of the vote, and two of the three targeted seats in winning six constituencies total, their best showing since winning sixteen in 2009.

Seats targeted by The Left
Rank	Constituency	Candidate	Winning party 2021	Swing required	Winning party 2025	Lead
1	Berlin-Treptow – Köpenick	Gregor Gysi	Left	19.99% (Note: Lead)	Left	21.30%
2	Erfurt – Weimar – Weimarer Land II	Bodo Ramelow	SPD	8.02%	Left	10.17%
3	Rostock – Landkreis Rostock II	Dietmar Bartsch	SPD	8.72%	AfD	1.20%

The Free Voters targeted four constituencies to enter the Bundestag as a faction via the Grundmandatsklausel. They failed to win any seats as all Bavarian seats were once again won by CSU.

Seats targeted by the Free Voters
Rank	Constituency	Candidate	Winning party 2021	Swing required	Winning party 2025	Lead
1	Rottal-Inn	Hubert Aiwanger	CSU	18.37%	CSU	11.91%
2	Oberallgäu	Indra Baier-Müller	CSU	20.75%	CSU	28.19%
3	Augsburg-Stadt	Michael Wörle	CSU	23.79%	CSU	27.35%
4	Landshut	Peter Dreier	CSU	26.09%	CSU	13.92%

== Foreign interference ==
According to the Federal Office for the Protection of the Constitution, foreign powers may attempt to discredit candidates seen as undesirable or raise doubts about the election's legitimacy.

=== United States and Russia ===
Multiple officials in the Trump administration have supported the AfD, causing Germany's firewall against the far-right, which had been weakened following Friedrich Merz's utilization of AfD's votes to pass legislation in 2025, to crack.

United States businessman and government official Elon Musk repeatedly posted in favor of the AfD on his platform X. He also endorsed AfD in an op-ed published in Welt am Sonntag. This was indirectly criticized by President Steinmeier and directly by the CDU, Greens, SPD, FDP, Left, the German Journalists Association and other German media as unacceptable external influence.

A few months after the January 2025 salute controversy, Musk video called the AfD during a rally and told them "children should not be guilty of the sins of their parents, or let alone their parents, their great-grandparents maybe even." One commentator said people at the rally were "kind of astonished he would say it so openly, but then they clapped," suggesting Musk was implying Germans should not feel ashamed of their Nazi history. Musk then said "I do not say it lightly when I say the future of civilization could hang on this election." AfD politician Maximilian Krah said that by affiliating his public image with the AfD, Musk is "balancing out" the firewall by alleviating the German establishment's ability to keep the far-right out of the mainstream discussion.

In February 2025, Vice-President JD Vance made an appearance at the 61st Munich Security Conference and accused Germany's leaders of oppressing free speech with the firewall against the AfD. He also said illegal migration was the "most urgent" challenge faced by Europe. Vance also met with Alice Weidel at the conference, co-chairwoman of the AfD.

Vance's speech was criticised, among others, by Chancellor Olaf Scholz (Social Democratic Party of Germany), Natalia Pouzyreff (The Republic on the Move), Opposition Leader and next Chancellor Friedrich Merz (Christian Democratic Union of Germany), Minister of Defense Boris Pistorius (Social Democratic Party of Germany), Vice Chancellor Robert Habeck (Alliance 90/The Greens), and Minister for Foreign Affairs Annalena Baerbock (Alliance 90/The Greens). Merz said "The Americans are calling into question democratic institutions. They are openly interfering in an election. It is not the job of the US government to tell us how to protect democratic institutions in Germany."

German security authorities also expected interference in the federal election campaign from abroad. The focus was on officially controlled disinformation campaigns from Russia, to whom Musk is alleged to be connected. The European Digital Media Observatory at the European University Institute cites an investigation from German outlet Correctiv that found over 100 websites had been established with the help of artificial intelligence to spread disinformation regarding electoral candidates.

== Members of the Bundestag standing down ==
Name	Party	State	Constituency	Member since	Ref.
Andreas Rimkus	SPD	North Rhine-Westphalia	Düsseldorf II	2013	
Peter Ramsauer	CSU	Bavaria	Traunstein	1990	
Renate Künast	Green	Berlin	N/A	2002	
Niels Annen	SPD	Hamburg	Hamburg-Eimsbüttel	2005	
Sarah Ryglewski	SPD	Bremen	N/A	2017	
Annette Widmann-Mauz	CDU	Baden-Württemberg	Tübingen	1998	
Yvonne Magwas	CDU	Saxony	N/A	2013	
Nadine Schön	CDU	Saarland	St. Wendel	2009	
Michelle Müntefering	SPD	North Rhine-Westphalia	Herne – Bochum II	2013	
Markus Grübel	CDU	Baden-Württemberg	Esslingen	2002	
Andreas Scheuer	CSU	Bavaria	Passau	2002	
Kai Gehring	Green	North Rhine-Westphalia	N/A	2005	
Sönke Rix	SPD	Schleswig-Holstein	N/A	2005	
Manuela Rottmann	Green	Bavaria	N/A	2017	
Volkmar Klein	CDU	North Rhine-Westphalia	Siegen-Wittgenstein	2009	
Paul Lehrieder	CSU	Bavaria	Würzburg	2005	
Dietmar Nietan	SPD	North Rhine-Westphalia	N/A	2005	
Michael Gerdes	SPD	North Rhine-Westphalia	N/A	2009	
Tabea Rößner	Green	Rhineland-Palatinate	N/A	2009	
Kordula Schulz-Asche	Green	Hesse	N/A	2017	
Erwin Rüddel	CDU	Rhineland-Palatinate	N/A	2009	
Heike Baehrens	SPD	Baden-Württemberg	N/A	2013	
Michael Roth	SPD	Hesse	Werra-Meißner – Hersfeld-Rotenburg	1998	
Thomas Hitschler	SPD	Rhineland-Palatinate	Südpfalz	2013	
Astrid Damerow	CDU	Schleswig-Holstein	N/A	2017	
Tobias Lindner	Green	Rhineland-Palatinate	N/A	2011	
Martin Rosemann	SPD	Baden-Württemberg	N/A	2013	
Sven-Christian Kindler	Green	Lower Saxony	N/A	2009	
Oliver Grundmann	CDU	Lower Saxony	N/A	2013	
Christine Aschenberg-Dugnus	FDP	Schleswig-Holstein	N/A	2017	
Maria Klein-Schmeink	Green	North Rhine-Westphalia	Münster	2009	
Dagmar Andres	SPD	North Rhine-Westphalia	Euskirchen – Rhein-Erft-Kreis II	2021	
Michael Grosse-Brömer	CDU	Lower Saxony	Harburg	2002	
Hermann Gröhe	CDU	North Rhine-Westphalia	Neuss I	1994	
Udo Schiefner	SPD	North Rhine-Westphalia	N/A	2013	
Max Straubinger	CSU	Bavaria	N/A	1994	
Bernd Westphal	SPD	Lower Saxony	N/A	2013	
Beate Walter-Rosenheimer	Green	Bavaria	N/A	2012	
Marco Wanderwitz	CDU	Saxony	N/A	2002	
Albrecht Glaser	AfD	Hesse	N/A	2017	
Gesine Lötzsch	Left	Berlin	Berlin-Lichtenberg	2002	
Petra Pau	Left	Berlin	N/A	1998	
Karamba Diaby	SPD	Halle	Halle	2013	
Kevin Kühnert	SPD	Berlin	Berlin-Tempelhof-Schöneberg	2021	
Tessa Ganserer	Green	Bavaria	N/A	2021	
Cem Özdemir	Green	Baden-Württemberg	Stuttgart I	1994	
Volker Wissing	Ind.	Rhineland-Palatinate	N/A	2021	
Susanne Hennig-Wellsow	Left	Thuringia	N/A	2021	
Bernd Riexinger	Left	Baden-Württemberg	N/A	2017	
Helge Braun	CDU	Hesse	N/A	2021	
Monika Grütters	CDU	Berlin	Berlin-Reinickendorf	2021	
Ekin Deligöz	Green	Bavaria	N/A	1998	
Katja Keul	Green	Lower Saxony	N/A	2009	
Wolfgang Strengmann-Kuhn	Green	Hesse	N/A	2017	
Stefan Wenzel	Green	Lower Saxony	N/A	2021	
Mario Brandenburg	FDP	Rhineland-Palatinate	N/A	2017	
Canan Bayram	Green	Berlin	Berlin-Friedrichshain-Kreuzberg – Prenzlauer Berg East	2017	
Frank Bsirske	Green	Lower Saxony	N/A	2021	
Susanne Menge	Green	Lower Saxony	N/A	2021	
Markus Kurth	Green	North Rhine-Westphalia	N/A	2017	
Ingrid Nestle	Green	Schleswig-Holstein	N/A	2009	
Victor Perli	Left	Lower Saxony	N/A	2017	
Martina Renner	Left	Thuringia	N/A	2013	
Manfred Grund	CDU	Thuringia	Eichsfeld – Nordhausen – Kyffhäuserkreis	1994	
Enak Ferlemann	CDU	Lower Saxony	Cuxhaven – Stade II	2002	
Axel Schäfer	SPD	North Rhine-Westphalia	Bochum I	2002	
Sabine Weiss	CDU	North Rhine-Westphalia	Wesel I	2005	
Jens Koeppen	CDU	Brandenburg	Uckermark – Barnim I	2005	
Jan Korte	Left	Lower Saxony	N/A	2005	
Josip Juratovic	SPD	Baden-Württemberg	Heilbronn	2005	
Matthias Birkwald	Left	North Rhine-Westphalia	N/A	2009	
Beate Müller-Gemmeke	Green	Baden-Württemberg	N/A	2009	
Cornelia Möhring	Left	Schleswig-Holstein	N/A	2009	
Heike Brehmer	CDU	Saxony-Anhalt	Harz	2009	
Thomas Lutze	SPD	Saarland	N/A	2009	
Ingo Gädechens	CDU	Schleswig-Holstein	Ostholstein – Stormarn-Nord	2009	
Josef Rief	CDU	Baden-Württemberg	Biberach	2009	
Edgar Franke	SPD	Hesse	Schwalm-Eder	2009	
Wolfgang Hellmich	SPD	North Rhine-Westphalia	N/A	2013	
Ingrid Pahlmann	CDU	Lower Saxony	N/A	2013	
Bernhard Daldrup	SPD	North Rhine-Westphalia	N/A	2013	
Claudia Tausend	SPD	Bavaria	N/A	2013	
Gabriele Katzmarek	SPD	Baden-Württemberg	N/A	2013	
Bettina Müller	SPD	Rhineland-Pfalz	N/A	2013	
Martin Rosemann	SPD	Baden-Württemberg	N/A	2013	
Katja Leikert	CDU	Hesse	N/A	2013	
Erich Irlstorfer	CSU	Bavaria	Freising	2013	
Achim Post	SPD	North Rhine-Westphalia	N/A	2013	
Susanne Mittag	SPD	Lower Saxony	Delmenhorst – Wesermarsch – Oldenburg-Land	2013	
Manfred Todtenhausen	FDP	North Rhine-Westphalia	N/A	2017	
Matthias Seestern-Pauly	FDP	Lower Saxony	N/A	2017	
Olaf in der Beek	FDP	North Rhine-Westphalia	N/A	2017	
Mathias Stein	SPD	Schleswig-Holstein	Kiel	2017	
Christoph Hoffmann	FDP	Baden-Württemberg	N/A	2017	
Reinhard Houben	FDP	North Rhine-Westphalia	N/A	2017	
Hermann-Josef Tebroke	CDU	North Rhine-Westphalia	Rheinisch-Bergischer Kreis	2017	
Katrin Budde	SPD	Saxony-Anhalt	N/A	2017	
Leni Breymaier	SPD	Baden-Württemberg	N/A	2017	
Susanne Ferschl	Left	Bavaria	N/A	2017	
Barbara Benkstein	AfD	Thuringia	Meissen	2017	
Manuel Gava	SPD	Lower Saxony	Stadt Osnabrück	2021	
Dirk Spaniel	WU	Baden-Württemberg	N/A	2021	
Volker Münz	AfD	Baden-Württemberg	N/A	2024	
Knut Gerschau	FDP	Lower Saxony	N/A	2021	
Emily Vontz	SPD	Saarland	N/A	2023	
Dagmar Andres	SPD	North Rhine-Westphalia	N/A	2021	
Martin Diedenhofen	SPD	North Rhine-Westphalia	N/A	2021	
Jürgen Berghahn	SPD	North Rhine-Westphalia	Lippe I	2021	
Anke Domscheit-Berg	Left	Brandenburg	N/A	2017	
Ingo Bodtke	FDP	Saxony-Anhalt	N/A	2021	
Hans-Jürgen Thies	CDU	North Rhine-Westphalia	Soest	2017	
Frank Ullrich	SPD	Thuringia	Suhl – Schmalkalden-Meiningen – Hildburghausen – Sonneberg	2021	

== Opinion polls ==
Local regression of polls conducted

== Turnout ==
By 14:00 local time, early estimates from German election officials indicated that voter turnout was higher this year compared to 2021. 52% of eligible voters had already cast their ballots, excluding mail-in votes. In contrast, at the same point in 2021, the turnout was 36.5%. The results are not directly comparable with those of 2021 because more voters voted by absentee ballot in 2021 due to COVID-19.

Turnout	Time					
Turnout	14:00			18:00		
Turnout	2021	2025	±	2021	2025	±
Total	36.5%	52.0%	▲15.5 pp	76.4%	82.5%	▲6.2 pp

In recent German federal elections, including the 2025 election, voter turnout has shown significant regional variations. Participation rates have traditionally been higher in western states such as Bavaria and Baden-Württemberg, while lower in eastern states like in Saxony-Anhalt and Mecklenburg-Vorpommern. However, the 2025 election registered an increase of voter participation in the east, particularly in areas where the AfD gained support. Certain regions, mostly in eastern Germany, experienced exceptional surges in voter participation. In Thuringia, turnout by 12:00 PM reached 44.5%, nearly doubling the figure from the same time in the previous election. Similar upward trends were observed in Berlin and Saxony-Anhalt, where midday turnout stood at 33% and 37.1%, respectively, both unusually high for these regions.

== Results ==
The election reflected a strong divide between the former West and East Germany, with the AfD becoming the largest party in the east and securing all five former East German states. Die Linke and BSW also experienced higher performance across the former border. All three secured their best results in eastern constituencies, while performing the worst in western ones. The opposite was the case for the four other major parties: CDU/CSU, SPD, the Greens and FDP, who all performed better in the West than the East. CDU/CSU became the largest party in the West, securing every area-state (Note: A relatively larger state that is not a city-state like Berlin, Hamburg or Bremen) there and winning every constituency in Bavaria.

A slideshow showing the difference between this election and the last

A slideshow showing the difference between this election and the last

Preliminary results
Party with most list votes in each constituency	Winning party of the single-member constituencies	Voter turnout in the constituencies
Parties' performances, second vote
Union's vote share	AfD's vote share	SPD's vote share
Grüne's vote share	Linke's vote share	BSW's vote share
FDP's vote share	FW's vote share	

Party	Party list			Constituency			Total seats	+/–
Party	Votes	%	Seats	Votes	%	Seats	Total seats	+/–
Christian Democratic Union	11,196,374	22.55	36	12,604,184	25.46	128	164	+12
Alternative for Germany	10,328,780	20.80	110	10,177,318	20.56	42	152	+69
Social Democratic Party	8,149,124	16.41	76	9,936,433	20.07	44	120	–86
Alliance 90/The Greens	5,762,380	11.61	73	5,443,393	11.00	12	85	–33
The Left	4,356,532	8.77	58	3,933,297	7.95	6	64	+25
Christian Social Union	2,964,028	5.97	0	3,272,064	6.61	44	44	–1
Sahra Wagenknecht Alliance	2,472,947	4.98	0	299,401	0.60	0	0	New
Free Democratic Party	2,148,757	4.33	0	1,622,912	3.28	0	0	–91
Free Voters	769,279	1.55	0	1,254,565	2.53	0	0	0
Human Environment Animal Protection Party	482,201	0.97	0	82,498	0.17	0	0	0
Volt Germany	355,262	0.72	0	391,666	0.79	0	0	0
Die PARTEI	242,741	0.49	0	122,268	0.25	0	0	0
Grassroots Democratic Party of Germany	85,373	0.17	0	41,923	0.08	0	0	0
Bündnis Deutschland	76,372	0.15	0	87,955	0.18	0	0	New
South Schleswig Voters' Association	76,138	0.15	1	58,779	0.12	0	1	0
Ecological Democratic Party	49,764	0.10	0	54,606	0.11	0	0	0
Team Todenhöfer	24,553	0.05	0	9,783	0.02	0	0	0
Party of Progress	21,388	0.04	0	1,282	0.00	0	0	0
Marxist–Leninist Party of Germany	19,551	0.04	0	24,218	0.05	0	0	0
Party of Humanists	14,294	0.03	0	1,871	0.00	0	0	0
Pirate Party Germany	13,800	0.03	0	2,151	0.00	0	0	0
Bavaria Party	12,278	0.02	0	5,763	0.01	0	0	0
Alliance C – Christians for Germany	11,768	0.02	0	2,021	0.00	0	0	0
MERA25	6,994	0.01	0	658	0.00	0	0	New
Values Union	6,736	0.01	0	2,849	0.01	0	0	New
Human World	694	0.00	0				0	0
Bürgerrechtsbewegung Solidarität	676	0.00	0	1,295	0.00	0	0	0
Socialist Equality Party	425	0.00	0	73	0.00	0	0	0
Party for Rejuvenation Research	303	0.00	0				0	0
Independents				70,163	0.14	0	0	0
Total	49,649,512	100.00	354	49,505,389	100.00	276	630	–105
Valid votes	49,649,512	99.44		49,505,389	99.15			
Invalid/blank votes	279,141	0.56		423,264	0.85			
Total votes	49,928,653	100.00		49,928,653	100.00			
Registered voters/turnout	60,510,631	82.51		60,510,631	82.51			
Source: Federal Returning Officer

=== Results by state ===
Party list vote share by state
State	Union	AfD	SPD	Grüne	Linke	BSW	FDP	Others	Turnout
Baden-Württemberg	31.6	19.8	14.2	13.6	6.8	4.1	5.6	4.3	83.4
Bavaria	37.2	19.0	11.6	12.0	5.7	3.1	4.2	7.2	84.5
Berlin	18.3	15.2	15.1	16.8	19.9	6.6	3.8	4.2	80.3
Brandenburg	18.1	32.5	14.8	6.6	10.7	10.7	3.2	3.4	81.5
Bremen	20.5	15.1	23.1	15.6	14.8	4.3	3.5	3.0	77.8
Hamburg	20.7	10.9	22.7	19.3	14.4	4.0	4.5	3.4	80.8
Hesse	28.9	17.8	18.4	12.6	8.7	4.4	5.0	4.2	83.1
Lower Saxony	28.1	17.8	23.0	11.5	8.1	3.8	4.1	3.6	83.4
Mecklenburg-Vorpommern	17.8	35.0	12.4	5.4	12.0	10.6	3.2	3.6	79.5
North Rhine-Westphalia	30.1	16.8	20.0	12.4	8.3	4.1	4.4	3.8	82.2
Rhineland-Palatinate	30.6	20.1	18.6	10.4	6.5	4.2	4.6	4.9	83.0
Saarland	26.9	21.6	21.9	7.2	7.3	6.2	4.3	4.7	82.4
Saxony	19.7	37.3	8.5	6.5	11.3	9.0	3.2	4.4	81.2
Saxony-Anhalt	19.2	37.1	11.0	4.4	10.8	11.2	3.1	3.3	77.7
Schleswig-Holstein	27.6	16.3	18.8	14.9	7.8	3.4	4.7	6.5	83.5
Thuringia	18.6	38.6	8.8	4.2	15.2	9.4	2.8	2.5	80.7

==== Constituency seats ====
Constituency seats won by state

As a result of the 2023 reform to fix the size at 630 seats, out of 299 constituencies, only 276 covered with a state-wide second vote coverage received the associated constituency seats. The CDU/CSU won 172 constituency seats, while the SPD got 44 and the AfD 42. The Greens got 12 constituency seats, with Die Linke securing 6. The AfD swept through the former East German states, winning 41 constituencies out of 44. It also won Marzahn – Hellersdorf constituency in eastern Berlin, making it the first time in its history it has won a seat in the capital.

Due to a lack of second vote coverage, 23 candidates with the most votes, at a rather low vote share between 24% and 34%, were not elected to the parliament. A simple example was the small state of Bremen, which is divided into two constituencies, and was assigned 5 seats according to population size and turnout. The SPD won second vote with 23%, which covers 1.15 seats, not enough to cover both constituencies (won with 30% and 25%). Thus, only the candidate in Bremen II – Bremerhaven (30%) won the single covered seat. Four other parties, between 20.6% and 14.8% second vote share covering 1.03 to 0.74 seats, each received a list seat. In former elections, both constituencies would have received their direct seat, and to restore proportions, additional balance list seats would have been assigned. Elsewhere, the losing winners or winning losers include 18 Union candidates - 15 from the CDU and three from the CSU - as well as four would-be delegates from the AfD.

The average vote for the only recently founded BSW in states where they ran is 2.5%. In some of those states like Thuringia they ran in all constituencies, remaining under 10%. The best results of "others" was by FW-leader and Bavarian minister Hubert Aiwanger in Rottal-Inn (electoral district).

State	Consti- tuencies	Awarded seats	Seats won					
State	Consti- tuencies	Awarded seats	SPD	CDU	CSU	Grüne	AfD	Linke
Baden-Württemberg	38	32		29 (6)	–	3		
Bavaria	47	44		–	44 (3)			
Berlin	12	12	1	3	–	3	1	4
Brandenburg	10	9	1		–		8 (1)	
Bremen	2	1	1 (1)		–			
Hamburg	6	6	3	1	–	2		
Hesse	22	17	2	15 (5)	–			
Lower Saxony	30	30	15	15	–			
Mecklenburg-Vorpommern	6	5			–		5 (1)	
North Rhine-Westphalia	64	64	17	44	–	3		
Rhineland-Palatinate	15	12	1	11 (3)	–			
Saarland	4	4	2	2	–			
Saxony	16	15			–		14 (1)	1
Saxony-Anhalt	8	7			–		7 (1)	
Schleswig-Holstein	11	10	1	8 (1)	–	1		
Thuringia	8	8			–		7	1
Total (not awarded)	299	276 (23)	44 (1)	128 (15)	44 (3)	12	42 (4)	6

==== List seats ====
State	Total seats	Seats won					
State	Total seats	SPD	CDU	Grüne	AfD	Linke	SSW
Baden-Württemberg	47	13		9	19	6	–
Bavaria	57	14	–	14	22	7	–
Berlin	12	3	2	2	3	2	–
Brandenburg	12	3	4	2		3	–
Bremen	4		1	1	1	1	–
Hamburg	7		2	1	2	2	–
Hesse	28	8		7	9	4	–
Lower Saxony	35	2	6	8	13	6	–
Mecklenburg-Vorpommern	8	2	3	1		2	–
North Rhine-Westphalia	72	14	3	16	26	13	–
Rhineland-Palatinate	19	6		4	7	2	–
Saarland	4			1	2	1	–
Saxony	15	3	7	2		3	–
Saxony-Anhalt	9	2	4	1		2	–
Schleswig-Holstein	15	4		3	5	2	1
Thuringia	10	2	4	1	1	2	–
Total	354	76	36	73	110	58	1

=== Voter demographics ===
Sociology of the electorate
Demographic	Union	AfD	SPD	Grüne	Linke	BSW	FDP	Others
Total vote	29%	21%	16%	12%	9%	5%	4%	4%
Sex
Men	30%	24%	15%	11%	7%	4%	5%	4%
Women	27%	18%	18%	13%	11%	6%	4%	3%
Age
18–24 years old	13%	21%	12%	10%	25%	6%	5%	8%
25–34 years old	17%	24%	12%	14%	16%	6%	5%	6%
35–44 years old	24%	26%	13%	14%	8%	6%	4%	5%
45–59 years old	33%	22%	15%	12%	5%	5%	4%	4%
60–69 years old	33%	19%	21%	11%	5%	5%	4%	2%
70 or older	43%	10%	25%	7%	5%	4%	5%	1%
Education
Primary education	32%	29%	20%	4%	5%	4%	3%	3%
Secondary education	28%	28%	15%	6%	7%	6%	3%	7%
Higher education	27%	13%	16%	18%	11%	5%	5%	5%
Socio-occupational classification
Blue-collar worker	22%	38%	12%	5%	8%	5%	4%	6%
White-collar worker	26%	21%	15%	13%	9%	6%	4%	6%
Self-employed	35%	21%	10%	14%	7%	2%	9%	2%
Retired	39%	13%	24%	9%	5%	4%	4%	2%
Personal economic situation
Good	31%	17%	17%	13%	8%	5%	5%	4%
Bad	17%	39%	12%	6%	11%	7%	3%	5%
Source: Infratest dimap

== Analysis and aftermath ==
The CDU/CSU, AfD and Die Linke were considered the biggest winners of the election. In total, about 14% of votes are not represented, and the seats are distributed among other parties. Thus, CDU/CSU plus SPD hold 52% of seats despite receiving only 45% of the popular vote.

Following the election, a lack of diversity in the new Bundestag was reported. There were 23 candidates who received the most constituency votes in their districts (which would have previously entitled them to a Direktmandat) were excluded from sitting due to the 2023 electoral reform enacted by the Scholz government.

=== CDU/CSU ===
The evening following the election, CDU leader Friedrich Merz stated that he and his party were fundamentally opposed to partnering with the AfD to form a government, saying: "We have fundamentally different views, for example on foreign policy, on security policy, in many other areas, regarding Europe, the euro, [and] NATO. ... You want the opposite of what we want, so there will be no cooperation." However, in January 2025, Merz and the CDU had looked for active support from the AfD on several proposals about immigration policies, leading some to speculate that the "firewall" excluding the far-right from governing had fallen, or was no longer a major factor in the party's political strategy.

Merz said that the CDU/CSU alliance had already started negotiations with the SPD to form a coalition government by April the same year; although the same coalition had already supported governments led by Chancellor Angela Merkel for 12 years, some commentators noted how Merz's political background – being a representative of the CDU's most conservative wing – and his previous criticism of left-wing parties, including the SPD itself and The Greens, faced criticism by progressive politicians. Further political divergences and issues between the CDU and the SPD, including immigration policies, support for Ukraine against the Russian invasion, public expense, and fiscal policy, were also cited as key factors that could influence the stability of the government, as well as the relations between Merz and Markus Söder, the leader of the CSU – the Bavarian counterpart of the CDU.

=== AfD ===
The AfD increased its vote share in all states and became the largest party in all five former East German states; according to the exit polls, it was the second most-voted party in the 18-29 age bracket (21%), behind only the Linke, and the most voted party among voters aged between 30 and 44 (26%). Though all other parties represented in the Bundestag stated their opposition to forming an alliance or coalition with the AfD, the CDU campaigned largely on an anti-immigration platform. Björn Höcke, the AfD leader in Thuringia, claimed that "the CDU has employed conservative right wing slogans in their election campaign", arguing that the AfD was the best-positioned party to help Merz implement his campaign agenda.

The AfD became the largest opposition party in the Bundestag. This position grants the party significant parliamentary privileges, including the right to respond first to the chancellor’s addresses, increased speaking time, and greater influence in committee assignments. The AfD's influence over committee leadership positions has raised concerns among its opponents, particularly regarding its potential role in security and intelligence oversight. The party's growing representation in the Bundestag also results in increased public funding. Although all other parties uphold a firewall against cooperation with the AfD, its leaders have expressed confidence that mounting political pressures may eventually force the CDU/CSU to engage with them.

=== SPD ===
The SPD only received 16.4% of the vote, the lowest in the modern history of the party. Despite their poor result the SPD are likely to stay in government, though as a minority partner in a grand coalition with the CDU. Following the results of the election, SPD leader and incumbent Chancellor Olaf Scholz announced he would not seek to take part in negotiations for a new government led by CDU leader Friedrich Merz. As a result, SPD co-leader Lars Klingbeil took over negotiations and was expected to become the party's new leader in the Bundestag.

=== Greens ===
The morning after the election, co-chancellor candidate of The Greens Robert Habeck announced his withdrawal from the party's leadership. The other co-candidate for The Greens, Annalena Baerbock, as well as former party leader Ricarda Lang, were expected to become the next party leaders in the Bundestag.

=== Die Linke ===
Die Linke, which had been initially projected to struggle to return to the Bundestag until weeks before the election took place, won 8.8% of all votes, almost twice as much as their result in the previous cycle; according to the exit polls, it was the most voted party among voters aged between 18 and 29 (24%). It also increased its vote share in every region. Some analysts attributed the party's result to the positive outcome of its campaign, which had notably avoided focusing on more restrictive immigration policies, in contrast to other left of centre parties such as the SPD, and had included further measures to fight poverty and the housing crisis. Its success was used as an example for several international left wing parties.

=== FDP ===
The FDP recorded the worst result in its history in terms of percentage of the party list vote. The party failed to reach the five percent hurdle, and consequently did not return to the Bundestag. Shortly after the result became known, Christian Lindner resigned as the party's leader and announced his retirement from active politics. The FDP's general secretary, Marco Buschmann, also stepped down from his role.

=== BSW ===
The BSW fell just short of reaching the nationwide five percent hurdle with 9,529 votes fewer than needed to qualify for seats. The 4.98% of the second vote meant they would not be represented in the Bundestag. Some noted how the rise of Die Linke in opinion polls prior to the election might have likely harmed the prospects of the BSW. As a result, party leader Sahra Wagenknecht threatened to take legal action over the election's results, citing overseas voting problems.

The BSW submitted a request to the Bundestag's election review committee requesting a full recount, though the committee ultimately rejected the request on 4 December 2025, and the BSW subsequently announced it would appeal to the Federal Constitutional Court. The BSW has argued that votes for it could have been incorrectly attributed to the small Bündnis Deutschland party, which appeared directly above it on the ballot in 15 out of 16 states; some transmission errors of that nature were identified and corrected following the election. Legal experts have stated that the chances of a recount being ordered by the Constitutional Court are slim.

=== International reactions ===
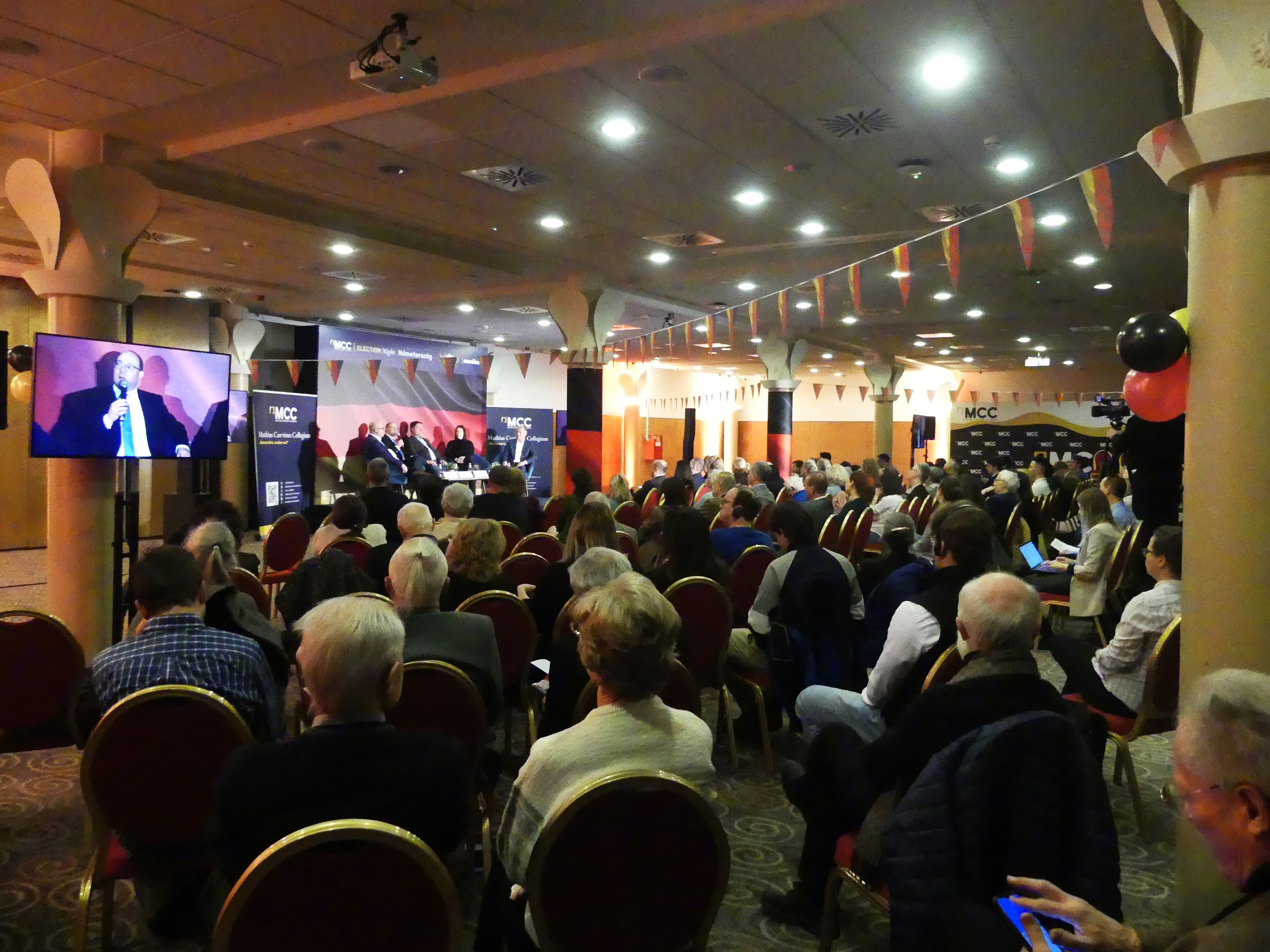
Election Night at Hungarian-German Institute, MCC

==== Leaders ====
- United States: In a post on Truth Social, President Donald Trump congratulated the election winners without naming Friedrich Merz or the CDU/CSU. He argued that Germany's shift to the right reflected a political trend shared with the United States, driven by issues like immigration and energy policy.
- United Kingdom: Prime Minister Keir Starmer congratulated Merz and the CDU/CSU for their election results and expressed a willingness to cooperate further with the next German government.
- Ukraine: President Volodymyr Zelenskyy congratulated the CDU/CSU on their victory and said he would look forward to "continuing our joint work" to "bring real peace closer to Ukraine, and strengthen Europe."
- France: President Emmanuel Macron said he had spoken with Merz to congratulate him on his election victory and praised SPD leader Scholz.
- Israel: Prime Minister Benjamin Netanyahu congratulated Merz and the CDU/CSU and expressed a desire to increase cooperation between the two countries.
- Egypt: President Abdel Fattah el-Sisi congratulated Merz and the CDU/CSU on their election victory, wishing him success. He expressed a commitment to strengthening strategic bilateral relations and emphasized the importance of joint coordination in "promoting regional peace and stability at this critical time."
- Greece: Prime Minister Kyriakos Mitsotakis called the election "A decisive victory for our political family, for Germany, and for Europe. Congratulations Friedrich Merz! One thing is clear: you will be Germany's next chancellor."
- Czech Republic: Prime Minister Petr Fiala called for greater cooperation between the next German government and hoped for success in the forthcoming coalition negotiations.
- Hungary: Prime Minister Viktor Orbán congratulated Alice Weidel on X stating that "people of Germany voted for change in immense numbers."
- Finland: Prime Minister Petteri Orpo congratulated Friedrich Merz, emphasizing the need for a strong Germany to support Ukraine and bolster Europe's security and economy.
- Latvia: Prime Minister Evika Siliņa expressed enthusiasm about building a "stronger, more secure and competitive Europe" with Merz.
- Portugal: Prime Minister Luís Montenegro looked forward to tackling "common challenges in the EU, NATO and the United Nations."
- Denmark: Prime Minister Mette Frederiksen congratulated Merz, stressing the importance of a "strong Europe and a strong Germany" in uncertain times.
- Croatia: Prime Minister Andrej Plenković congratulated Merz and Söder, and expressed hope that the formation of a new German government will be as soon as possible.
- NATO: Secretary-General Mark Rutte congratulated Merz on his election victory and called on European allies to increase defence spending.
- Russia: Kremlin spokesman Dmitry Peskov emphasized a desire for a more pragmatic approach to areas of mutual interest but acknowledged that the future of bilateral ties would depend on how the new German government acts, stating that Russia would wait to see how relations evolve.

==== Others ====
- Austria: The Freedom Party of Austria leader Herbert Kickl, stated: "Today, a gentle, soothing wind of the freedom of 1989 is blowing through Berlin and the entire Federal Republic."
- Italy: Deputy Prime Minister Matteo Salvini congratulated AfD co-leader Alice Weidel and stated: "Change is winning in Germany too! AfD doubles its votes, despite attacks and lies from the left: stop illegal immigration and Islamic fanaticism, enough with the eco-madness, prioritize peace and jobs, Europe must be radically changed."

== Government formation ==
Possible majorities in the Bundestag	Seats
Total seats	630
Two-thirds majority (420 or more seats)
CDU/CSU-AfD-Greens-Linke	509
CDU/CSU-SPD-Greens-Linke	477
Absolute majority (316 or more seats)
CDU/CSU-SPD-Greens	413
CDU/CSU-AfD	360
CDU/CSU-Greens-Linke	357
CDU/CSU-SPD	328
No majority (315 or fewer seats)
CDU/CSU-Greens	293
SPD-Greens-Linke	269

With all major parties rejecting to cooperate with the AfD, the CDU/CSU reached out to SPD, as well as the Greens and Left. This "firewall" was shown in the first parliament session: while every faction has a confirmed right to have one member act as proxy to the speaker, the President of the Bundestag, only those suggested by CDU, CSU, SPD, Greens and Left were actually elected. The AfD candidate was rejected once again, in three rounds, like all of several dozen candidates since 2017. The failure of the FDP and BSW to reach the 5 per cent threshold in the Bundestag meant that these two parties did not receive seats in the new Bundestag.

In total, about 14% of votes were not represented, and the seats were distributed among other parties. Thus, CDU/CSU plus SPD received 52% of seats despite receiving only 45% of the popular vote. Although the CDU/CSU emerged as the strongest party group, it fell far short of an absolute majority. (The only time a party group obtained an absolute majority was in 1957.) As usual, further coalition negotiations were necessary. The only possible majorities in the Bundestag involving just two groups would be the ones involving the CDU/CSU and either the SPD or, just mathematically, the "firewalled" AfD.

Since Friedrich Merz had publicly ruled out a coalition with the AfD on repeated occasions before and after the election, the only coalition which was considered was one between the centre-right CDU/CSU and the centre-left SPD. The SPD under the leadership of co-party leader Lars Klingbeil agreed to the talks. The decision to start the talks immediately was motivated by the desire of both parties to find a solution to pressing challenges such as the stagnating German economy, the ongoing Russian invasion of Ukraine and concerns about the actions of US President Donald Trump that are undermining transatlantic relations, to avoid prolonged political uncertainty.

Because the CDU/CSU and SPD were always the strongest parties until this election, a coalition of the two is conventionally known as a "grand coalition" (Große Koalition, Groko). Such a coalition has already existed four times in Germany (Kiesinger cabinet in the 1960s, and since 2005 also in the first, third, and fourth Merkel cabinets), most recently from 2017 until 2021 under Chancellor Angela Merkel, when the Jamaica coalition negotiations between the CDU, Greens, and FDP failed and a CDU-led grand coalition with SPD was formed instead. The Grand Coalitions often only materialised when other coalitions were not possible.

=== Beginning of exploratory talks ===
The CDU team included Friedrich Merz and other high-ranking officials such as CSU leader Markus Söder, CDU General Secretary Carsten Linnemann and CDU parliamentary group leader Thorsten Frei, CSU parliamentary group leader Alexander Dobrindt, the Saxon Minister President Michael Kretschmer, the deputy chairwoman of the CDU Karin Prien and CSU politician Dorothee Bär. The SPD delegation was made up of important personalities such as Defence Minister Boris Pistorius and Labour Minister Hubertus Heil, as well as the Secretary General Matthias Miersch, Bundestag President Bärbel Bas, the two Minister Presidents Manuela Schwesig and Anke Rehlinger, and the head of the SPD in North Rhine-Westphalia Achim Post.

Both sides had originally wanted the talks not to commence until 5 March, in view of the state election in Hamburg on 2 March, as well as Carnival (peaking 3 March), which is very popular in some parts of Germany. Subsequently, however, Klingbeil and Merz agreed to an early start in their talks, so exploratory talks between the two parties began in Berlin on 28 February 2025, five days after the election. Merz had set himself the target of forming a coalition by Easter. From the outset, there were differences of opinion between the CDU and SPD on the reform of the debt brake (which limited the German budget deficit to 0.35% of GDP per year), a possible tax reform, the minimum tax reform, the minimum wage, the citizen's income, immigration and a new right to vote. Following the events at the White House involving American president Donald Trump and Ukrainian president Volodymyr Zelenskyy on 28 February, exploratory talks were further intensified, as both parties recognised the need for a government capable of acting quickly in Europe's largest economy after Trump suspended US military aid for Ukraine. The parties met again on 3 March.

=== Debt brake agreement ===
On the evening of 4 March, after it had already become apparent several times over the course of the previous days, it was made public that the CDU/CSU and SPD had reached an agreement on the debt ceiling. According to the draft, there were plans to change the Basic Law (German constitution) in order to exclude defence expenditure of over 1% of GDP and a second special fund, this time not for defence as in 2022, but for infrastructure, in the amount of 500 billion euros. (Merz had ruled out a reform of the debt brake and additional debt during the election campaign.)

Since the proposals would require changes to the Basic Law, they would require approval by a two-thirds majority in both the Bundestag and the Bundesrat; however, in the newly elected, incoming Bundestag, parties opposed to these changes (the far-right AfD and The Left) together held a blocking minority of more than one third of the members. The prospective coalition partners (CDU/CSU and SPD) therefore decided to attempt to pass the legislation through the outgoing 20th Bundestag (elected in 2021), where they could reach the necessary majority if either Greens or FDP voted in favour. Therefore, the parties requested two special sessions on the proposed constitutional changes (12 and 18 March). According to Article 39 (2) of the Basic Law, an outgoing Bundestag is capable of acting until the inauguration of the newly elected parliament, no later than the 30th day after the election. An outgoing Bundestag had decided on urgent matters before but never on changes to the Basic Law, nor had this previously been done by a parliament prematurely dissolved.

On 8 March, both sides started of coalition negotiations and set out their initial common positions in a paper. The plans were criticised by the AfD, which saw it as "socialism". The FDP viewed it as "ideologised climate policy". The Greens and The Left criticised omissions in the social sphere, and the BSW saw it as "a red carpet rolled out for the AfD to enter the Chancellery in 2029". Economists also criticised the paper. On 10 March, the Greens, on whose approval the CDU and SPD were reliant on for their plans, announced that they would not approve the project. Instead, they introduced their own draft bill in the Bundestag which, among other things, called for the debt brake to be applied not only to defence, but also for civil defence and cyber security at 1% of GDP. They also saw the special funds for infrastructure as a way for the SPD and CDU/CSU to finance their election campaign promises, instead of actual infrastructure. Nevertheless, they were open to talks. At the same time, The Left and AfD took their case to the Federal Constitutional Court to appeal against the special sessions and the constitutional amendments in the "old" Bundestag as they felt their rights as members of parliament had been violated. The requests for an interim injunction were rejected by the Federal Constitutional Court on 14 March.

The first of the two special Bundestag sessions was then held on 12 March. The SPD and CDU/CSU motions, as well as those of the Greens and the FDP, were referred to the relevant committees after a long debate. On the same day, the minister presidents of the federal states in Berlin called for speed. In the meantime, it was uncertain whether the necessary majority in the Bundesrat existed, as it was reported that the Free Voters in Bavaria and the BSW in Brandenburg and Thuringia would not vote in favour of the change. On 13 March, it was announced that the Greens, CDU, and SPD had reached an agreement. According to the compromise, 100 billion of the 500 billion special funds for infrastructure will go towards climate protection. Moreover, spending on civil defence, cyber security, intelligence services and aid to countries attacked in violation of international law will all be excluded from the debt brake.

On 16 March, the Bundestag Budget Committee, which is primarily responsible for motion to amend the Basic Law on debt matters, met. It dealt with the motions from the CDU/CSU and SPD, the Greens, and the FDP. In its recommendation for a resolution, the committee proposed the already-agreed legislative text of the CDU/CSU, SPD, and Greens for a vote. The FDP's draft bill was rejected. On 17 March, the Federal Constitutional Court published several decisions on urgent petitions submitted by the AfD, The Left and the FDP or their MPs. The plaintiffs wanted the court to declare that the planning of the legislative procedure violated the plaintiffs' rights as members of parliament, as the speed of implementation did not do justice to the complexity of the matter. This would have halted the legislative process. The court dismissed the applications in summary proceedings as the potential immediate harm could not be sufficiently demonstrated. The decision in the main proceedings is still pending.

Motion to change the Basic Law (Bundestag) Reform the German balanced budget amendment
Ballot →	18 March 2025
Required majority →	489 out of 718
Yes: • SPD (205); • CDU/CSU (193); • Greens (112); • SSW (1); • Independent (1)	512 / 718
No: • FDP (87); • AfD (73); • The Left (28); • BSW (9); • Independent (6); • CDU/CSU (1); • Greens (1); • SPD (1)	206 / 718
Abstentions	0 / 718
Absentees: • Greens (4); • AfD (3); • FDP (3); • CDU/CSU (2); • BSW (1); • Independent (1); • SPD (1)	15 / 733
Result →	Approved

On 18 March, the Bundestag met for its second special session. Before debate began, Bundestag President Bärbel Bas (SPD) recalled the first free election in the GDR on 18 March 1990, after which the Bundestag rejected several motions to suspend the Rules of Procedure tabled by the FDP and the AfD. The debate centred not only on the SPD, CDU/CSU, and Greens' bill, but also on that of the FDP and a motion for a resolution by the BSW entitled "No to war-mongering – yes to diplomacy and disarmament".

The SPD parliamentary group leader Lars Klingbeil called it a "historic decision" for Germany and Europe. CDU/CSU leader Friedrich Merz said a "paradigm shift in defence policy" was needed to continue to guarantee Europe's security. Green parliamentary group leader Britta Haßelmann accused Merz of partisan tactics, as he had ruled out debt during the election campaign. Nevertheless, she was pleased with the compromise. The FDP party leader Christian Lindner accused the new government of "unrestrained debt creation". The AfD and The Left also criticised Merz and the legislative process.

In the end, the majority of the CDU/CSU, SPD and Greens voted in favour of the motion, with a total of 512 MPs voting in favour and 212 against. The amendment to the Basic Law was thus passed. The vote was hailed as a victory for Friedrich Merz and a significant step toward changing the Basic Law to allow for greater flexibility in defence and infrastructure spending. With the Bundestag's approval by a two-thirds majority, the proposed changes moves to the Bundesrat, where it requires approval by a two-thirds majority for full enactment. NATO Secretary General Mark Rutte and EU Commission President Ursula von der Leyen welcomed the decision.

Also on 18 March, the Free Voters, who were in government with the CSU in Bavaria, announced that they would vote in favour of the law in the Bundesrat. As such, a two-thirds majority in the Bundesrat was considered certain. On 21 March, the Bundesrat voted in favour of the amendment 53–16, passing the two-thirds threshold to become law. The states of Brandenburg, Saxony-Anhalt, Thuringia, and Rhineland-Palatinate all abstained from voting, which was counted as voting in opposition.

Composition of the Bundesrat on 21 March 2025

In several states (North Rhine-Westphalia, Baden-Württemberg, Bremen, and Hesse), the FDP state parliamentary groups announced that they would appeal to the state constitutional courts against their state governments' approval of the law. The applications were all rejected as they were inadmissible. The reasonings were that the state government would responsible for representing and voting for a state in the Bundesrat, which meant that it alone could decide how to vote; and that individual parliamentary groups were not authorised to assert the rights of a state parliament; only the state parliament itself could do so.

On 21 March, the Federal Constitutional Court dismissed another urgent application by the AfD to prevent the Bundesrat from meeting. The session was opened by Bundesrat President Rehlinger with a memorial speech in honour of the late Bundesrat President and Minister President Bernhard Vogel. The meeting then moved directly to the planned legislative amendments: In his speech, Baden-Württemberg's Minister President Winfried Kretschmann praised the extension of the 500 billion infrastructure package to include climate protection. He said: "More climate protection is a core task of this century." Nevertheless, he lamented a "feeling of disruption" due to the rapid legislative process.

Motion to change the Basic Law (Bundesrat) Reform the German balanced budget amendment
Ballot →	21 March 2025
Required majority →	46 of 69
Yes: • Baden-Württemberg (6) • Bavaria (6) • Berlin (4) • Bremen (3) • Hamburg (3) • Hesse (5) • Mecklenburg-Vorpommern (3) • Lower Saxony (6) • North Rhine-Westphailia (6) • Saarland (3) • Saxony (4) • Schleswig-Holstein (4)	53 / 69
No	0 / 69
Abstentions: • Brandenburg (4) • Rhineland-Palatinate (4) • Saxony-Anhalt (4) • Thuringia (4)	16 / 69
Result →	Approved

Bavaria's Minister President Markus Söder called for the money from the infrastructure package to be distributed and utilised sensibly. He said it is "not a self-service shop for any projects". He also called for a long-term repayment plan. Regardless of party affiliation, almost all speakers welcomed the easing of the debt brake for the federal states and called on the federal government to significantly speed up the planning and award procedures for contracts from the infrastructure package and to quickly pass the necessary implementation laws in order to eliminate the "ailing infrastructure" and the "investment backlog" (both terms used by several speakers) as quickly as possible. Bremen's head of government Andreas Bovenschulte said: "What use is the most beautiful special fund if we can't manage it in practice?"

In the end, all federal states except Brandenburg, Rhineland-Palatinate, Saxony-Anhalt and Thuringia (which abstained) voted in favour. The four states that abstained did so due to disagreement between the state government coalition partners. While the CDU and SPD each wanted approval, the BSW and FDP wanted the proposal to be rejected. When a state's own government could not reach consensus, the state would abstain. President Frank-Walter Steinmeier signed the law on 22 March.

=== Grand coalition agreement ===
With the announcement of the exploratory paper by the CDU/CSU and SPD on 8 March 2025, both parties indicated that they wanted to start coalition negotiations quickly. On 13 March the working groups began their work after an initial meeting between the party executive committees and their leaders. Each working group consisted of six representatives from the CDU, three from the CSU, and seven from the SPD. There were 16 working groups in total, as well as a steering group that dealt with the working methods of the government and parliamentary groups, electoral law and the responsibilities of the working groups in the event of overlaps.

According to a publicly released handout on the coalition negotiations by the party leaders, there were strict guidelines regarding publicity; for example, there were to be “no statements, no press conferences, no communication of interim results, no selfies, etc.”.

By 24 March at the latest, all working groups had presented the final papers on their topics after some difficult debates. Although these were also supposed to be kept secret, they were all leaked relatively quickly. As could be seen from the papers, the CDU/CSU and SPD reached agreement on certain points, but many problems, especially major ones, were written into the final papers without agreement, in square brackets, in which the respective demands were included. According to media reports, the negotiators in the finance working group in particular were far apart and, judging by the final paper, were only able to agree on a few points. The parties also disagreed on the digital ministry demanded by Friedrich Merz. Nevertheless, both sides were optimistic that the new government would be formed.

This was followed by the second, three-day “drafting phase”, during which the parties reviewed and compiled the results of the negotiations for themselves before the final round of negotiations began on 28 March in the so-called 19-party round. In addition to the party leaders, it also included CDU secretary general Carsten Linnemann and Defense Minister Boris Pistorius. The aim of these negotiations is the coalition agreement, which the coalition partners want to have in place by Easter. Although this goal was already very ambitious at the time, the party leaders were confident. Deputy CDU chairwoman and later Education Minister Karin Prien said that there was still a lot of time before Easter. "Our country needs a new government. But we will not allow ourselves to be pressured into bad results, we want good results for our country."

Major disagreements that needed to be resolved included financial and tax policy, migration and defense.

After sometimes lengthy negotiations, the party executives of the CDU, CSU, and SPD jointly announced their coalition agreement on 9 April 2025. At the presentation, Chancellor-designate Friedrich Merz described the coalition agreement as a strong signal to citizens and Europe. The political center is capable of solving the country's problems. During the negotiations, a relationship of trust was established with the SPD leaders Saskia Esken and Lars Klingbeil. Merz expects the new federal government to be able to get to work at the beginning of May. On 11 April, it was agreed that Merz would be elected chancellor on 6 May. SPD leader Lars Klingbeil emphasized that savings would create leeway for project agreements. Much is subject to funding. That is why the draft of the coalition agreement often speaks of “want”, not “will”. But, according to Klingbeil, the coalition agreement offers the potential for Germany to emerge stronger from this period.

Naturally, the opposition strongly criticized the coalition agreement. Opposition leader Alice Weidel (AfD) described it as a “document of capitulation”. In her opinion, the paper “bears the signature of the election loser SPD throughout". The CDU/CSU had "bamboozled and lied to the citizens with false election promises" and not a single election promise had been kept. In addition, the government program does not address the important challenges facing the country. The Greens criticized the coalition agreement as a major disappointment: they asserted that the coalition agreement contained nothing for people in particular, nor did it address social issues or education. "This coalition has money like hay, but ideas like straw," explained Green co-leader Brantner. The Left Party, meanwhile, described the coalition agreement as a "document of ignorance towards hard-working people and the major challenges of our time". FDP politician Christian Dürr also criticized the plans of the CDU/CSU and SPD. According to Dürr, Germany will be ruled by despondency in the future and the promised policy change will not materialize. BSW Chairwoman Sahra Wagenknecht explained that the coalition agreement does not provide an answer to the economic crisis and trade war. As a result, the coalition would further strengthen the AfD.

In order for the coalition to begin its work, the parties had to agree to the terms of the coalition agreement. The CSU did this on 10 April with a unanimous decision by the party executive as well as the CSU regional group in the Bundestag and the Bavarian CSU state parliamentary group. On 28 April the CDU federal committee also voted in favor with an “overwhelming majority”, according to the chairman of the meeting and Saxony's Minister President Michael Kretschmer. On the same day, the CDU announced its ministers. For the SPD, as always, the party base was allowed to decide on participation in the coalition. A good 358,000 party members were called upon to cast their votes by 29 April. The youth organization of the SPD, the Jusos, announced before the vote that they wanted to speak out against the agreement, as they did not see central election promises fulfilled. Nevertheless, according to the SPD, 84.6% of those who voted were in favor of the coalition agreement and 15.4% against; the majority was thus higher than in the votes on the grand coalitions in 2013 (76%) and 2018 (66%). At just under 56%, the turnout was above the required 20%. On 5 May the SPD then also announced its ministers before the coalition agreement was signed on the same day.

On the same day, former Chancellor Olaf Scholz was bid farewell with military honors.

=== Chancellor election ===
After the party leaders of the CDU, CSU and SPD signed their coalition agreement, President Frank-Walter Steinmeier officially proposed Friedrich Merz to Bundestag President Julia Klöckner for election as Chancellor, which was put to the vote the next day by secret ballot.

Although the CDU/CSU and SPD had 328 of 630 members of the Bundestag, in the first round of voting Merz received only 310 votes, below the required 316. This was the first time this happened in the history of the Federal Republic of Germany. After the election result was announced, the session was interrupted.

According to Article 63 (3) of the Basic Law, the election of the Chancellor was now in the second phase: within a period of 14 days, i.e. until 20 May, a quarter of the members of the Bundestag could nominate a candidate for election as Federal Chancellor. The number of ballots is not predetermined and is theoretically unlimited. If a candidate is elected in one of these ballots, the President must appoint him or her.

Surprised by his failure to win enough votes, Merz's coalition asked the parliament's legal department whether a second vote could be held the same day. During the adjournment of the session, the factions of the Bundestag discussed a second round of voting. All parliamentary groups agreed that the second round of voting should take place on 6 May. The CDU/CSU and SPD parliamentary groups once again put forward Friedrich Merz as their candidate. He was elected in the second round of voting. He was then appointed Chancellor by President Frank-Walter Steinmeier and sworn in to the Bundestag. The federal ministers were then appointed by Federal President Steinmeier and then sworn in by the Bundestag.

== See also ==
- 2024 German government crisis
- 2025 elections in the European Union
