= Guido van den Berg =

German politician (1975–2019)

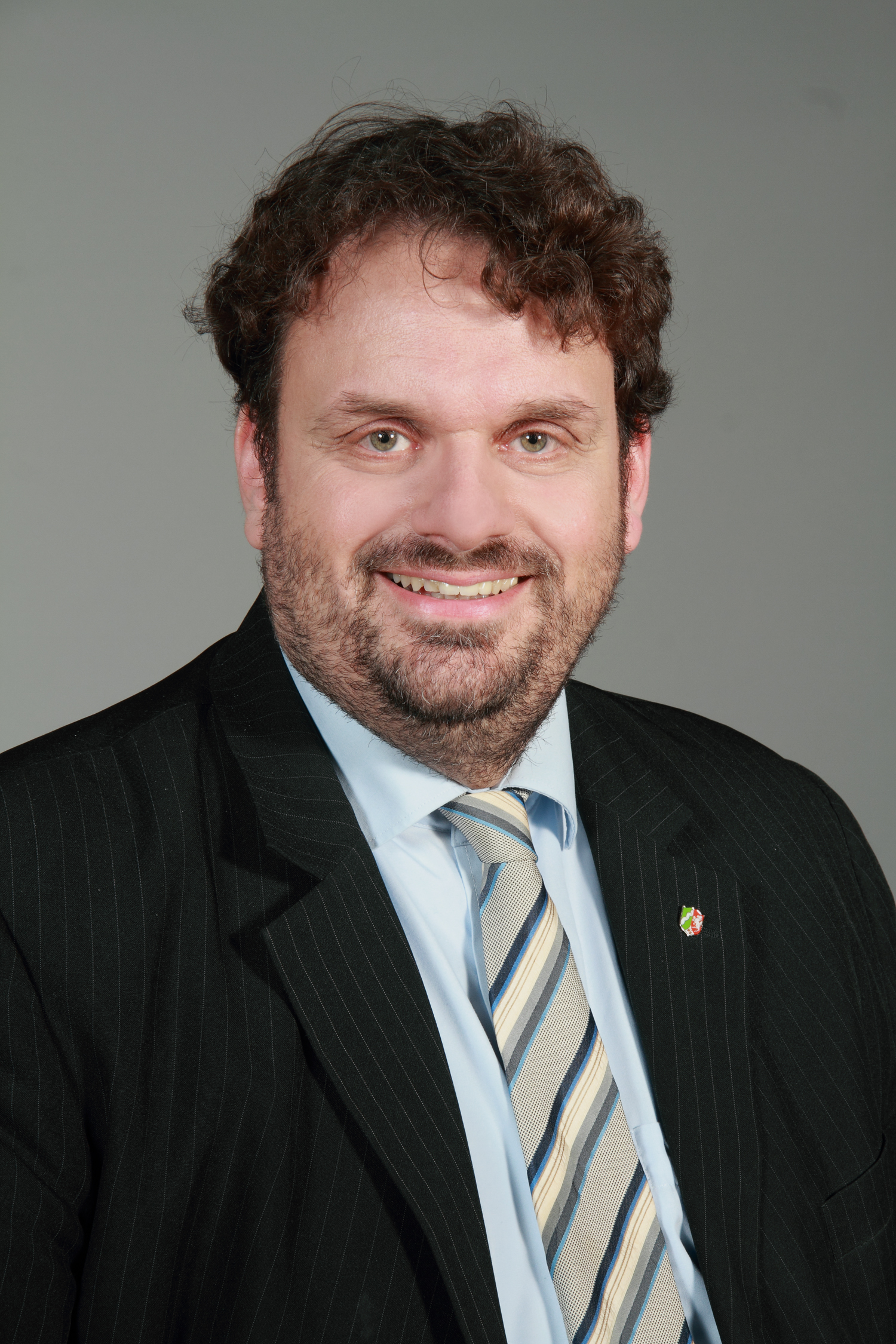
Van den Berg in 2013

Guido van den Berg (24 February 1975 – 2 May 2019) was a German politician for the Social Democratic Party (SPD). At the time of his death, he had been serving as a member of the Landtag of North Rhine-Westphalia since 2012, and as deputy district administrator of Rhein-Erft-Kreis since 2014. A member of the Rhein-Erft-Kreis district council (since 1999) and Bedburg's council (1999–2014), van den Berg was a member of the SPD from 1992 and held numerous positions in the party at district level.

Born in Grevenbroich, Rhein-Kreis Neuss, van den Berg studied economics and political science at the University of Cologne and the University of Duisburg-Essen. He was married and had two children.

Van den Berg died of cancer on 2 May 2019 in Grevenbroich, at the age of 44.
