= Gregor Golland =

German politician (born 1974)

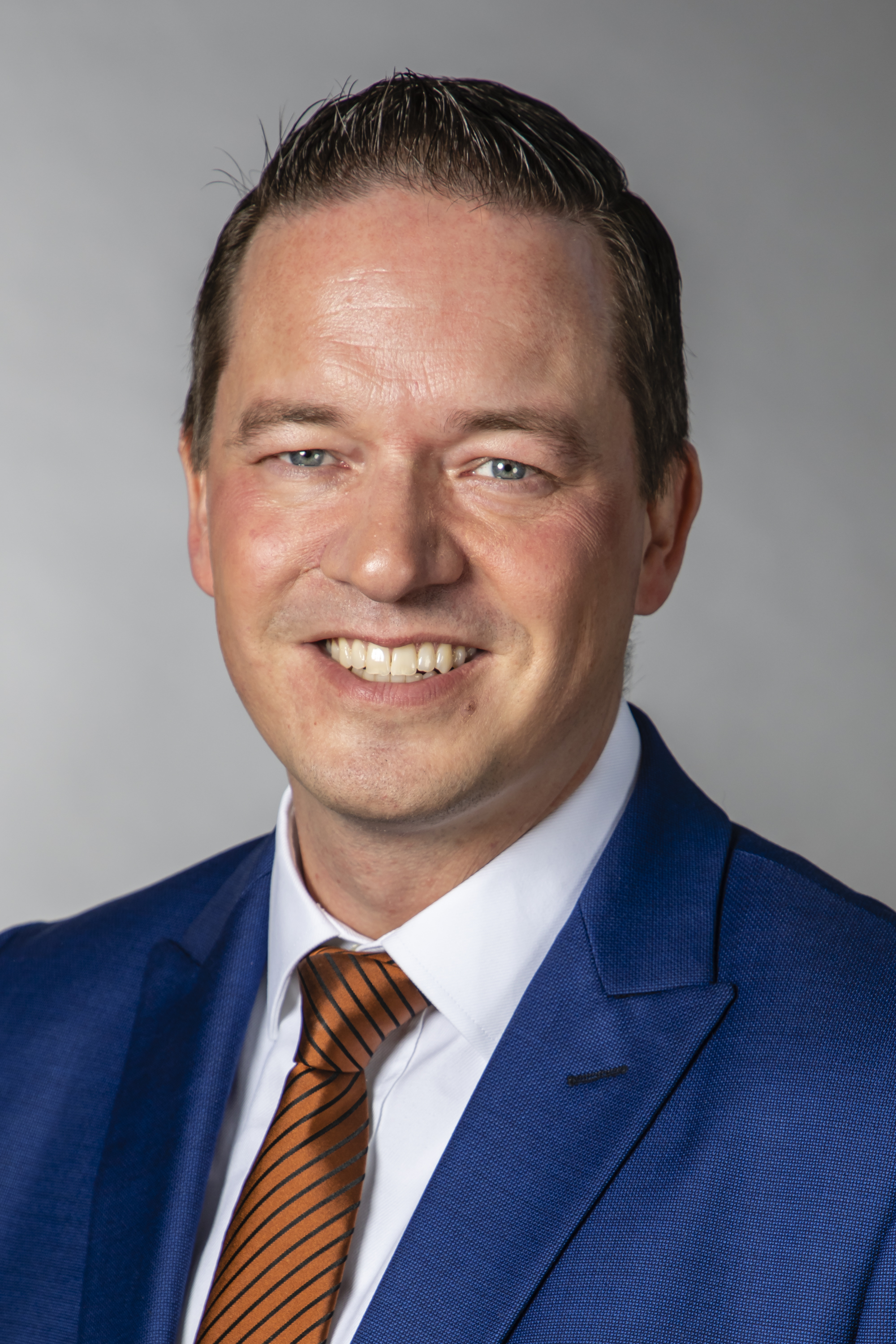
- Golland in 2019

Member of the Landtag of North Rhine-Westphalia
- Incumbent
- Assumed office 9 June 2010
- Preceded by: Michael Breuer
- Constituency: Rhein-Erft-Kreis III (2010–2012, 2017–present)

Personal details
- Born: 21 November 1974 (age 51) Brühl
- Party: Christian Democratic Union (since 1990)

Gregor Golland (born 21 November 1974 in Brühl) is a German politician serving as a member of the Landtag of North Rhine-Westphalia since 2010. He has served as deputy group leader of the Christian Democratic Union since 2017.
