= Results of the 2025 German federal election =

2025 German federal election
- 23 February 2025
- All 630 seats in the Bundestag; 316 seats needed for a majority
- Turnout: 82.5% ▲6.2pp
Party	Leader	Vote %	Seats	+/–
CDU/CSU	Friedrich Merz	28.5%	208	+11
AfD	Alice Weidel	20.8%	152	+69
SPD	Olaf Scholz	16.4%	120	−86
Greens	Robert Habeck	11.6%	85	−33
Left	Jan van Aken; Heidi Reichinnek	8.8%	69	+30
BSW	Sahra Wagenknecht	4.9%	0	0
FDP	Christian Lindner	4.3%	0	−91
SSW	Stefan Seidler	0.2%	1	0
This lists parties that won seats. See the complete results below.
Results for the single-member constituencies
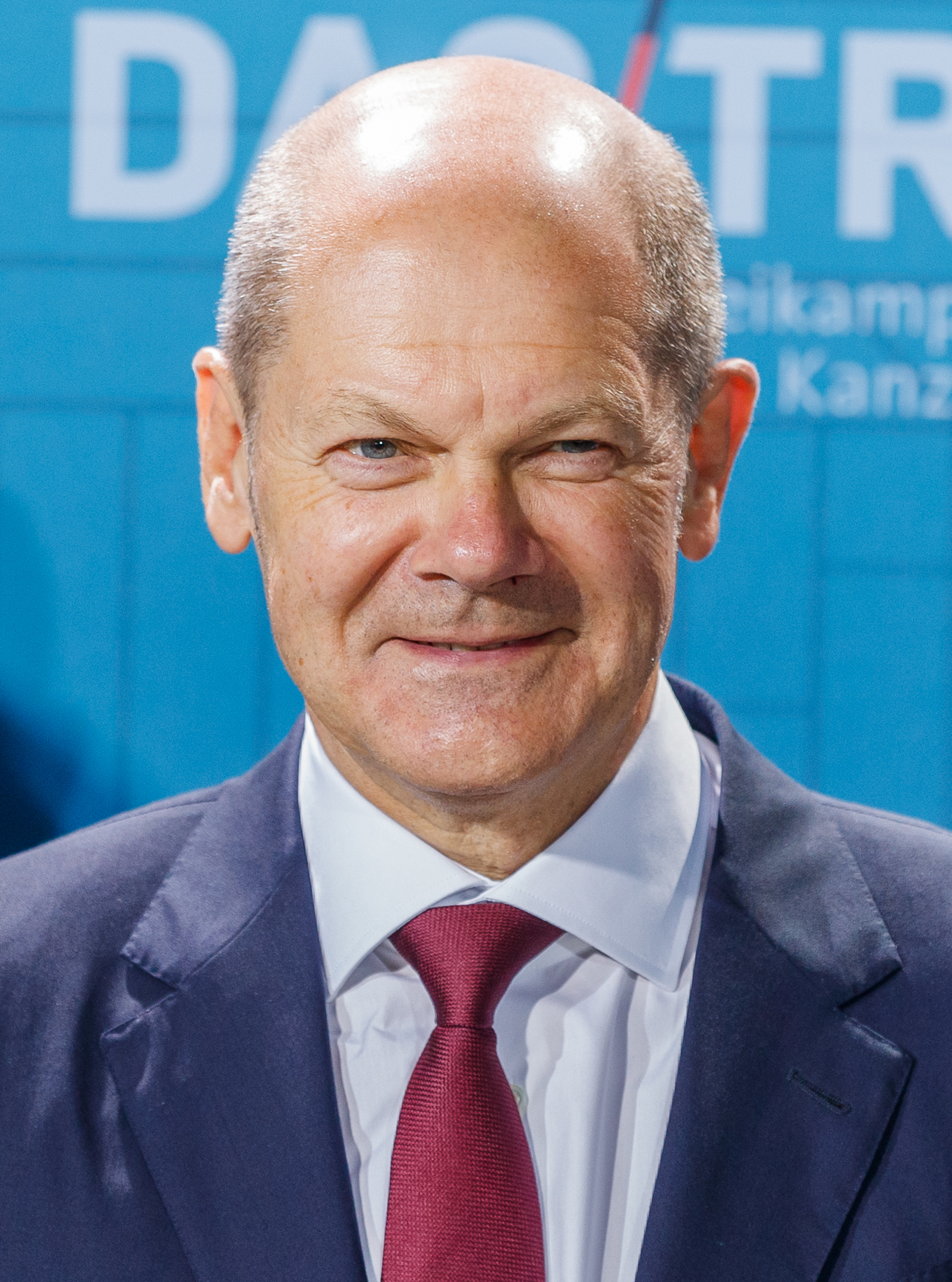

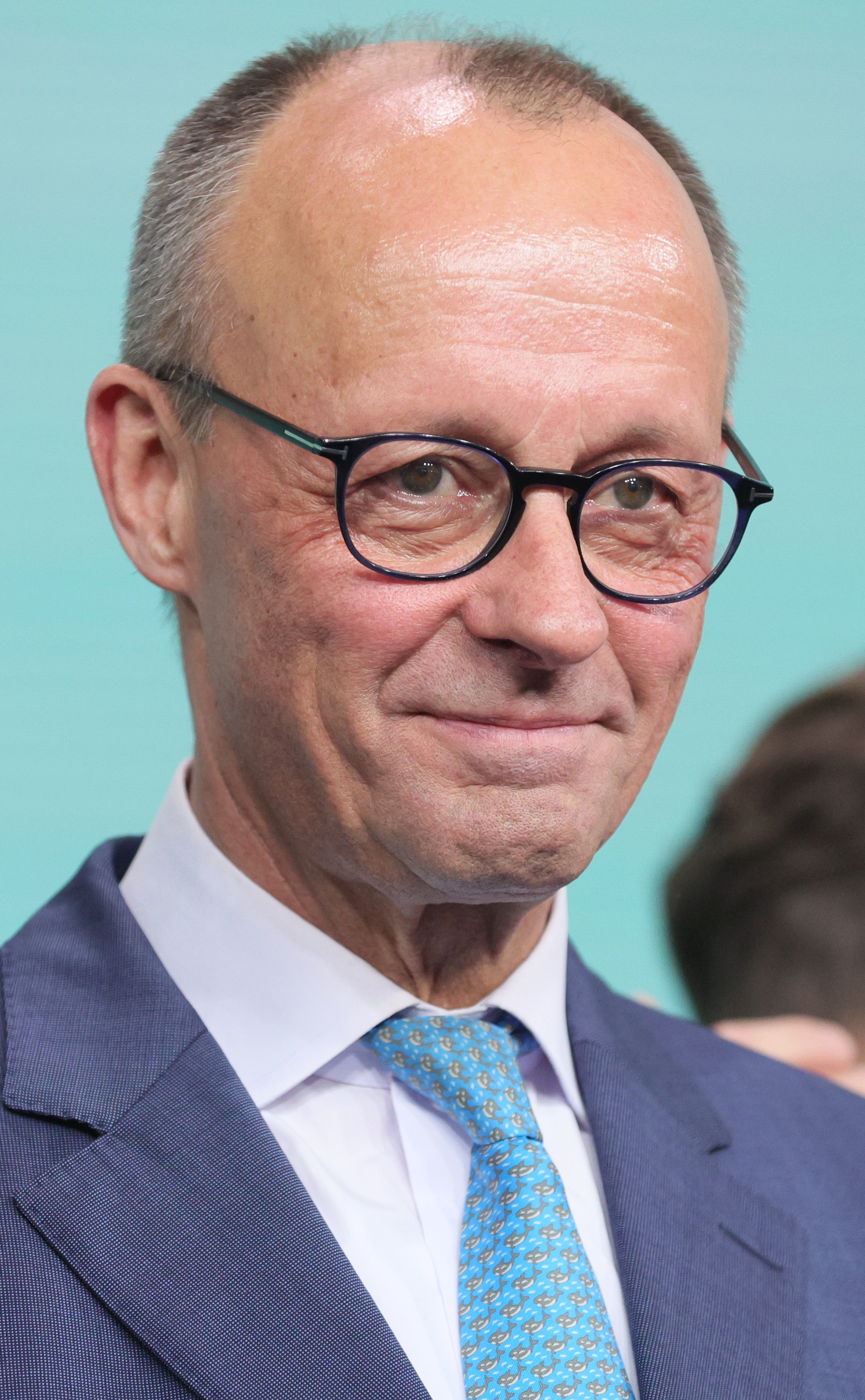
Chancellor before	Chancellor after
Olaf Scholz; SPD	Friedrich Merz; CDU

This is a breakdown of the results of the 2025 German federal election. The following tables display detailed results in each of the sixteen states and all 299 single-member constituencies.

Due to several major and minor parties failing to pass the electoral threshold called Five percent hurdle, 13.9% of voters are not represented in the 2025 Bundestag, the second highest percentage of forfeited second votes in German federal elections. CDU/CSU and SPD formerly had represented a two-party system with a combined approval of over 90% in the 1970s, and as late as 2017 had formed a grand coalition with 53% voter share. In 2025, they only received a combined 44.9% of the votes, but with only 86.1% of the voters being represented with seats, they still won a majority of 328 of 630 seats.

== Nationwide ==
Party	Party list			Constituency			Total seats	+/–
Party	Votes	%	Seats	Votes	%	Seats	Total seats	+/–
Christian Democratic Union	11,196,374	22.55	36	12,604,184	25.46	128	164	+12
Alternative for Germany	10,328,780	20.80	110	10,177,318	20.56	42	152	+69
Social Democratic Party	8,149,124	16.41	76	9,936,433	20.07	44	120	–86
Alliance 90/The Greens	5,762,380	11.61	73	5,443,393	11.00	12	85	–33
The Left	4,356,532	8.77	58	3,933,297	7.95	6	64	+25
Christian Social Union	2,964,028	5.97	0	3,272,064	6.61	44	44	–1
Sahra Wagenknecht Alliance	2,472,947	4.98	0	299,401	0.60	0	0	New
Free Democratic Party	2,148,757	4.33	0	1,622,912	3.28	0	0	–91
Free Voters	769,279	1.55	0	1,254,565	2.53	0	0	0
Human Environment Animal Protection Party	482,201	0.97	0	82,498	0.17	0	0	0
Volt Germany	355,262	0.72	0	391,666	0.79	0	0	0
Die PARTEI	242,741	0.49	0	122,268	0.25	0	0	0
Grassroots Democratic Party of Germany	85,373	0.17	0	41,923	0.08	0	0	0
Bündnis Deutschland	76,372	0.15	0	87,955	0.18	0	0	New
South Schleswig Voters' Association	76,138	0.15	1	58,779	0.12	0	1	0
Ecological Democratic Party	49,764	0.10	0	54,606	0.11	0	0	0
Team Todenhöfer	24,553	0.05	0	9,783	0.02	0	0	0
Party of Progress	21,388	0.04	0	1,282	0.00	0	0	0
Marxist–Leninist Party of Germany	19,551	0.04	0	24,218	0.05	0	0	0
Party of Humanists	14,294	0.03	0	1,871	0.00	0	0	0
Pirate Party Germany	13,800	0.03	0	2,151	0.00	0	0	0
Bavaria Party	12,278	0.02	0	5,763	0.01	0	0	0
Alliance C – Christians for Germany	11,768	0.02	0	2,021	0.00	0	0	0
MERA25	6,994	0.01	0	658	0.00	0	0	New
Values Union	6,736	0.01	0	2,849	0.01	0	0	New
Bürgerrechtsbewegung Solidarität	676	0.00	0	1,295	0.00	0	0	0
Human World	694	0.00	0				0	0
Socialist Equality Party	425	0.00	0	73	0.00	0	0	0
Party for Rejuvenation Research	303	0.00	0				0	0
Independents				70,163	0.14	0	0	0
Total	49,649,512	100.00	354	49,505,389	100.00	276	630	–105
Valid votes	49,649,512	99.44		49,505,389	99.15			
Invalid/blank votes	279,141	0.56		423,264	0.85			
Total votes	49,928,653	100.00		49,928,653	100.00			
Registered voters/turnout	60,510,631	82.51		60,510,631	82.51			
Source: Federal Returning Officer

== Seat apportionment ==
Seats are distributed to all parties clearing the threshold, either through getting more than 5% of second votes, having the most first votes in at least 3 constituencies, or being a national minority party. Seats are first distributed to the political parties in an overall distribution using the Sainte-Laguë method. The seats won by each party are then distributed to the party in each state, based on the votes it received in that state, also using the Sainte-Laguë method. For each calculation, a divisor is chosen by the Federal Returning Officer so that the total number of seats to be allocated are distributed. The tables below reflect the calculations officially carried out.

=== Overall distribution ===
Overall distribution
Party	Votes	Quotients	Seats
CDU	11,196,374	164.41	164
AfD	10,328,780	151.67	152
SPD	8,149,124	119.66	120
Greens	5,762,380	84.62	85
Linke	4,356,532	63.97	64
CSU	2,964,028	43.52	44
SSW	76,138	1.12	1
Divisor: 68,100

=== Subdistribution ===
State	CDU			AfD			SPD			Greens			Linke		
State	Votes	Quotients	Seats	Votes	Quotients	Seats	Votes	Quotients	Seats	Votes	Quotients	Seats	Votes	Quotients	Seats
Schleswig-Holstein	518,424	7.61	8	306,165	4.54	5	352,546	5.18	5	279,923	4.03	4	146,428	2.09	2
Mecklenburg-Vorpommern	181,956	2.67	3	357,361	5.29	5	126,687	1.86	2	54,719	0.79	1	123,059	1.76	2
Hamburg	216,935	3.19	3	113,608	1.68	2	237,740	3.50	3	201,713	2.91	3	151,115	2.16	2
Lower Saxony	1,410,418	20.71	21	894,540	13.25	13	1,153,523	16.96	17	576,845	8.31	8	405,519	5.79	6
Bremen	71,573	1.05	1	52,496	0.78	1	80,604	1.19	1	54,280	0.78	1	51,461	0.74	1
Brandenburg	298,048	4.38	4	535,275	7.93	8	244,010	3.59	4	108,598	1.56	2	176,224	2.52	3
Saxony-Anhalt	256,538	3.77	4	496,110	7.35	7	146,535	2.15	2	59,077	0.85	1	143,807	2.05	2
Berlin	356,099	5.23	5	296,990	4.40	4	295,182	4.34	4	328,035	4.73	5	387,222	5.53	6
North Rhine-Westphalia	3,170,627	46.56	47	1,770,379	26.23	26	2,108,434	31.01	31	1,300,901	18.74	19	877,123	12.53	13
Saxony	507,247	7.45	7	958,401	14.20	14	217,144	3.19	3	167,269	2.41	2	290,462	4.15	4
Hesse	1,033,842	15.18	15	636,778	9.43	9	657,510	9.67	10	451,510	6.51	7	311,058	4.44	4
Thuringia	246,065	3.61	4	510,527	7.56	8	115,915	1.70	2	56,097	0.81	1	200,688	2.87	3
Rhineland-Palatinate	760,623	11.17	11	498,695	7.39	7	462,705	6.80	7	256,869	3.70	4	161,867	2.31	2
Bavaria	N/A			1,515,731	22.46	22	920,675	13.54	14	957,435	13.80	14	456,935	6.53	7
Baden-Württemberg	2,006,866	29.47	29	1,256,430	18.61	19	898,778	13.22	13	865,738	12.47	12	429,484	6.14	6
Saarland	161,113	2.37	2	129,294	1.92	2	131,136	1.93	2	43,371	0.62	1	44,080	0.63	1
Divisor	68,100			67,500			68,000			69,400			70,000		

== Leaders' races ==
Party	Name	Constituency	Votes	%	Position	Elected?
CDU/CSU	Friedrich Merz	Hochsauerlandkreis	78,620	47.7	1st	Elected
AfD	Alice Weidel	Bodensee	29,316	20.4	2nd	Elected on list
SPD	Olaf Scholz	Potsdam – Potsdam-Mittelmark II – Teltow-Fläming II	43,336	21.8	1st	Elected
GRÜNE	Robert Habeck	Flensburg – Schleswig	43,290	22.6	2nd	Elected on list
DIE LINKE	Jan van Aken	Hamburg party list			1st	Elected (was only on list)
DIE LINKE	Heidi Reichinnek	Stadt Osnabrück	18,862	11.8	4th	Elected on list
BSW	Sahra Wagenknecht	North Rhine-Westphalia party list			1st	Not elected
FDP	Christian Lindner	Rheinisch-Bergischer Kreis	9,053	4.9	6th	Not elected
SSW	Stefan Seidler	Flensburg – Schleswig	21,465	11.2	5th	Elected on list
FW	Hubert Aiwanger	Rottal-Inn	32,668	23.0	3rd	Not elected

== By state ==
(C) denotes that the member was elected thanks to their result in a constituency rather than their designated place on the list. Constituency winners are elected before list members, and take their place in order of vote percentage in the constituency in question. If a party wins more constituencies than they are entitled to by list vote, the constituency winners with the lowest vote share do not win their seat and no constituency seat is allocated. In 2025, this occurred in 23 constituencies.

=== Summary ===
Party list vote share by state
State	CDU/CSU	AfD	SPD	Grüne	Linke	BSW	FDP	Others
Schleswig-Holstein	27.6	16.3	18.8	14.9	7.8	3.4	4.7	6.5
Mecklenburg-Vorpommern	17.8	35.0	12.4	5.4	12.0	10.6	3.2	3.6
Hamburg	20.7	10.9	22.7	19.3	14.4	4.0	4.5	3.5
Lower Saxony	28.1	17.8	23.0	11.5	8.1	3.8	4.1	3.6
Bremen	20.5	15.1	23.1	15.6	14.8	4.3	3.5	3.1
Brandenburg	18.1	32.5	14.8	6.6	10.7	10.7	3.2	3.4
Saxony-Anhalt	19.2	37.1	11.0	4.4	10.8	11.2	3.1	3.2
Berlin	18.3	15.2	15.1	16.8	19.9	6.6	3.8	4.3
North Rhine-Westphalia	30.1	16.8	20.0	12.4	8.3	4.1	4.4	3.9
Saxony	19.7	37.3	8.5	6.5	11.3	9.0	3.2	4.5
Hesse	28.9	17.8	18.4	12.6	8.7	4.4	5.0	4.2
Thuringia	18.6	38.6	8.8	4.2	15.2	9.4	2.8	2.4
Rhineland-Palatinate	30.6	20.1	18.6	10.4	6.5	4.2	4.6	5.0
Bavaria	37.2	19.0	11.6	12.0	5.7	3.1	4.2	7.2
Baden-Württemberg	31.6	19.8	14.2	13.6	6.8	5.6	4.1	4.3
Saarland	26.9	21.6	21.9	7.2	7.3	6.2	4.3	4.6

Seats by state
State	Distribution	Total
Schleswig-Holstein	2 / 5 / 4 / 1 / 8 / 5	25
Mecklenburg-Vorpommern	2 / 2 / 1 / 3 / 5	13
Hamburg	2 / 3 / 3 / 3 / 2	13
Lower Saxony	6 / 17 / 8 / 21 / 13	65
Bremen	1 / 1 / 1 / 1 / 1	5
Brandenburg	3 / 4 / 2 / 4 / 8	21
Saxony-Anhalt	2 / 2 / 1 / 4 / 7	16
Berlin	6 / 4 / 5 / 5 / 4	24
North Rhine-Westphalia	13 / 31 / 19 / 47 / 26	136
Saxony	4 / 3 / 2 / 7 / 14	30
Hesse	4 / 10 / 7 / 15 / 9	45
Thuringia	3 / 2 / 1 / 4 / 8	18
Rhineland-Palatinate	2 / 7 / 4 / 11 / 7	31
Bavaria	7 / 14 / 14 / 44 / 22	101
Baden-Württemberg	6 / 13 / 12 / 29 / 19	79
Saarland	1 / 2 / 1 / 2 / 2	8
Germany	64 / 120 / 85 / 1 / 208 / 152	630

=== Schleswig-Holstein ===
Party	Constituency			Party list			Total seats	+/–
Party	Votes	%	Seats	Votes	%	Seats	Total seats	+/–
Christian Democratic Union (CDU)	573,541	30.6	8 (Note: CDU won 9 constituency seats in Schleswig-Holstein, but lost 1 seat due to insufficient Second vote coverage.)	518,424	27.6	0	8	▲2
Social Democratic Party (SPD)	424,485	22.6	1	352,546	18.8	4	5	▼3
Alternative for Germany (AfD)	302,259	16.1	0	306,165	16.3	5	5	▲3
Alliance 90/The Greens (GRÜNE)	279,298	14.9	1	279,923	14.9	3	4	▼2
The Left (DIE LINKE)	115,098	6.1	0	146,428	7.8	2	2	▲1
Free Democratic Party (FDP)	67,541	3.6	0	88,147	4.7	0	0	▼4
South Schleswig Voters' Association (SSW)	58,779	3.1	0	76,138	4.0	1	1	Steady
Sahra Wagenknecht Alliance (BSW)	–	–	–	64,777	3.4	0	0	New
Volt Germany	23,282	1.2	0	16,496	0.9	0	0	Steady
Die PARTEI	2,021	0.1	0	13,729	0.7	0	0	Steady
Free Voters	25,139	1.3	0	13,675	0.7	0	0	Steady
Bündnis Deutschland	3,227	0.2	0	2,981	0.2	0	0	New
Marxist–Leninist Party	286	0.0	0	576	0.0	0	0	Steady
Independents & voter groups	1,273	0.1	0	–	–	–	0	–
Invalid/blank votes	13,739	–	–	9,963	–	–	–	–
Total	1,889,968	100	10 (Note: Schleswig-Holstein has 11 constituencies, but 1 remained unallocated.)	1,889,968	100	15	25	−3
Registered voters/turnout	2,262,811	83.5	–	2,262,811	83.5	–	–	–
Source: Federal Returning Officer

==== Elected members ====
#	CDU	AfD	SPD	Grüne	Linke	SSW
Votes	518,367	306,191	532,671	279,932	146,398	76,126
%	27.6%	16.3%	18.8%	14.9%	7.8%	4.0%
Seats	8	5	5	4	2	1
Constituency seats	Mark Helfrich (C, 35.0%) [3]; Sebastian Schmidt (C, 34.8%) [7]; Dr. Johann Wadephul (C, 32.8%) [1]; Henri Schmidt (C, 32.7%) [11]; Sandra Carstensen (C, 32.7%) [8]; Leif Bodin (C, 32.7%) [5]; Melanie Bernstein (C, 32.3%) [4]; Daniel Kölbl (C, 31.8%) [9]		Tim Klüssendorf (C, 28.1%) [1]	Luise Amtsberg (C, 26.0%) [1]		
List seats		1. Kurt Kleinschmidt; 2. Gereon Bollmann; 3. Volker Schnurrbusch; 4. Kerstin Przygodda; 5. Sven Wendorf	2. Dr. Nina Scheer; 3. Dr. Ralf Stegner; 4. Bettina Hagedorn; 5. Truels Reichardt	2. Robert Habeck; 3. Denise Loop; 4. Dr. Konstantin von Notz	1. Lorenz Gösta Beutin; 2. Tamara Mazzi	1. Stefan Seidler
Not elected candidates	2. Petra Nicolaisen (C, 26.5%) (Note: Candidate won constituency but party polled insufficient list votes for this candidate to be seated); 6. Magdalena Drewes; 10. Dr. Dagmar Steiner; 12. Anna Uplegger; 13. Nils Lötsch; 14. Friederike Teetz; 15. Lukas Beck; 16. Gina-Marie von Mandel; 17. Thomas Klömmer; 18. Julia Thiesen; 19. Henning Schumann; 20. Juliane Müller-Weigel; 21. Christian Rahe; 22. Sabine Mues; 23. Timo Bohnhoff; 24. Telse Dierks; 25. Kole Gjoka; 26. Melanie Puschaddel-Freitag; 27. Volker Feddersen; 28. Jana Szymura; 29. Dr. Karsten Bornholdt; 30. Antje Pfeiffer; 31. Rüdiger Langbehn; 32. Dr. Stefanie Rönnau; 33. Hans-Walter Henningsen; 34. Henrike Biebow; 35. Jürgen Lamp; 36. Daniela Brunke; 37. Nanny Bergstein	6. Alexis Giersch (Note: Subsequently entered the Bundestag as a replacement candidate despite not being initially elected.); 7. Fabian Voß	6. Christina Schubert; 7. Dr. Kristian Klinck; 8. Johanna Selbert; 9. Felix Wilsberg; 10. Canan Canli; 11. Bengt Bergt; 12. Katrin Fedrowitz; 13. Hauke Thießen; 14. Cira Ahmad	5. Mayra Vriesema; 6. Bruno Hönel; 7. Juliane Michel-Weichenthal; 8. Dr. Samet Yilmaz; 9. Dr. Conny Clauson; 10. Lukas Unger; 11. Annette Granzin; 12. Dr. Fabian Faller; 13. Ann Hahn; 14. Fabian Osbahr; 15. Monika Wegener; 16. Robert Wlodarczyk; 17. Dr. Nadine Mai; 18. Ocean Renner; 19. Susanne Lohmann; 20. Ulrike Driller-Brunkhorst; 21. Sophia Marie Pott; 22. Frank Fischer; 23. Julia Dorandt; 24. Vincent Schlotfeldt; 25. Kerstin Leidt	3. Marlies Wiegand; 4. Finn Luca Frey; 5. Bianca Szygula; 6. Marc-André Bronkessel; 7. Melanie Arnold; 8. Mark Hintz	2. Maylis Roßberg; 3. Lukas Knöfler; 4. Sarina Magdalena Quäck; 5. Svend Wippich; 6. Svea Wagner; 7. Mads Lausten; 8. Lilli Marie Rachenpöhler; 9. Poul Sören Franck; 10. Helen Ghun Christiansen; 11. Thersten Falke; 12. Anne-Sophie Flügge-Munstermann; 13. Philipp Bohk; 14. Marie-Katrine Hahn; 15. Simon Teebken; 16. Manuel Ohlsen; 17. Eugen Wagner

Notes
(C, 0.0%) – constituency winner and vote share percent; [0] – position in the Land list (if available)

==== Constituency votes ====
#	Constituency	Elected member	Previous member	Vote share of winner %	Union	AfD	SPD	Grüne	Linke	BSW	FDP	SSW	Others	Total
1	Flensburg – Schleswig	None	Robert Habeck	26.5%	50,822	28,824	28,366	43,290	10,370	–	4,484	21,465	4,111	191,732
2	Nordfriesland – Dithmarschen Nord	Leif Bodin	Astrid Damerow	32.7%	49,866	24,472	31,169	16,627	7,919	–	5,749	14,253	2,657	152,712
3	Steinburg – Dithmarschen Süd	Mark Helfrich	Mark Helfrich	35.0%	50,928	29,693	30,733	14,468	8,709	–	5,647	–	5,157	145,435
4	Rendsburg-Eckernförde	Dr. Johann Wadephul	Sönke Rix	32.8%	56,163	26,417	36,266	20,473	8,675	–	8,170	11,075	4,128	171,367
5	Kiel	Luise Amtsberg	Mathias Stein	26.0%	34,941	17,811	36,688	43,283	15,946	–	4,825	7,363	5,323	166,180
6	Plön – Neumünster	Sandra Carstensen	Kristian Klinck	32.7%	46,370	25,249	33,977	18,852	7,623	–	4,693	–	4,949	141,713
7	Pinneberg	Daniel Kölbl	Ralf Stegner	31.8%	63,231	30,417	49,714	25,395	12,683	–	7,674	4,617	5,368	199,099
8	Segeberg – Stormarn-Mitte	Melanie Bernstein	Bengt Bergt	32.3%	67,881	36,071	51,437	24,800	12,636	–	9,417	–	7,807	210,049
9	Ostholstein – Stormarn-Nord	Sebastian Schmidt	Bettina Hagedorn	34.8%	52,022	25,929	38,071	15,636	8,232	–	5,422	–	4,358	149,670
10	Herzogtum Lauenburg – Stormarn-Süd	Henri Schmidt	Nina Scheer	32.7%	67,641	35,419	48,273	29,012	12,160	–	7,445	–	6,682	206,632
11	Lübeck	Tim Klüssendorf	Tim Klüssendorf	28.1%	33,695	21,972	39,809	27,477	10,175	–	4,028	2,636	–	141,752

=== Mecklenburg-Vorpommern ===
Party	Constituency			Party list			Total seats	+/–
Party	Votes	%	Seats	Votes	%	Seats	Total seats	+/–
Alternative for Germany (AfD)	376,846	37.0	5 (Note: AfD won all 6 constituency seats in Mecklenburg-Vorpommern, but lost 1 seat due to insufficient Second vote coverage.)	357,361	35.0	0	5	▲2
Christian Democratic Union (CDU)	205,786	20.2	0	181,956	17.8	3	3	Steady
Social Democratic Party (SPD)	179,547	17.6	0	126,687	12.4	2	2	▼4
The Left (DIE LINKE)	144,778	14.2	0	123,059	12.0	2	2	Steady
Sahra Wagenknecht Alliance (BSW)				107,872	10.6	0	0	New
Alliance 90/The Greens (GRÜNE)	36,898	3.6	0	54,719	5.4	1	1	Steady
Free Democratic Party (FDP)	29,339	2.9	0	32,678	3.2	0	0	▼1
Human Environment Animal Protection Party	6,199	0.6	0	15,656	1.5	0	0	Steady
Free Voters	27,571	2.7	0	10,814	1.1	0	0	Steady
Volt Germany				6,350	0.6	0	0	Steady
Bündnis Deutschland	6,839	0.7	0	3,248	0.3	0	0	New
Marxist–Leninist Party	1,284	0.1	0	842	0.1	0	0	Steady
Independents & voter groups	2,636	0.3	0				0	–
Invalid/blank votes	11,315	–	–	7,796	–	–	–	–
Total	1,029,038	100	5 (Note: Mecklenburg-Vorpommern has 6 constituencies, but 1 remained unallocated.)	1,029,038	100	8	13	−3
Registered voters/turnout	1,293,729	79.5	–	1,293,729	79.5	–	–	–
Source: Federal Returning Officer

==== Elected members ====
#	CDU	AfD	SPD	Grüne	Linke
Votes	181,963	357,356	126,703	54,721	123,051
%	17.8%	35.0%	12.4%	5.4%	12.0%
Seats	3	5	2	1	2
Constituency seats		Enrico Komning (C, 45.2%) [2]; Ulrike Schielke-Ziesing (C, 41.1%) [4]; Dario Seifert (C, 37.3%) [3]; Christoph Grimm (C, 36.9%); Leif-Erik Holm (C, 35.9%) [1]			
List seats	1. Philipp Amthor; 2. Simone Borchardt; 3. Georg Günther		1. Reem Alabali-Radovan; 2. Frank Junge	1. Claudia Müller	1. Dr. Dietmar Bartsch; 2. Ina Latendorf
Not elected candidates	4. Dr. Stephan Bunge; 5. Dietrich Monstadt; 6. Michael Ebert; 7. Dorin Müthel-Brenncke; 8. Jenny Gundlach; 9. Dr. Sonja von Campenhausen; 10. Armin Noeske	Steffi Burmeister (C, 26.8%); 5. Martin Schmidt; 6. Robert Schnell; 7. Peter Reizlein	3. Katrin Zschau; 4. Erik von Malottki; 5. Anna Kassautzki; 6. Dr. Maximilian Franz Hertrich; 7. Vanessa Freund; 8. Stefan Baetke; 9. Sylvia Schiefler; 10. Alexandru-Nicolae Umlauft; 11. Silke Becker	2. Dr. Felix Winter; 3. Katharina Horn; 4. Raphael Scherer; 5. Miroslava Zahradníčková; 6. Ole Krüger	3. Amina Inèz Kanew; 4. Hennis Herbst; 5. Maxi Ebel; 6. Niklas Hehenkamp; 7. Fabienne Urmoneit

Notes
(C, 0.0%) – constituency winner and vote share percent; [0] – position in the Land list (if available)

==== Constituency votes ====
#	Constituency	Elected member	Previous member	Vote share of winner %	Winning margin	Union	AfD	SPD	Grüne	Linke	BSW	FDP	Total
12	Schwerin – Ludwigslust-Parchim I – Nordwestmecklenburg I	Leif-Erik Holm	Reem Alabali-Radovan	35.9%	25,510	35,453	60,863	34,101	5,531	21,569	–	4,870	169,749
13	Ludwigslust-Parchim II – Nordwestmecklenburg II – Landkreis Rostock I	Christoph Grimm	Frank Junge	36.9%	24,762	32,839	59,416	34,654	5,747	18,094	–	4,422	161,226
14	Rostock – Landkreis Rostock II	None	Katrin Zschau	26.8%	2,077	34,403	47,598	30,031	9,397	45,521	–	5,037	177,565
15	Vorpommern-Rügen – Vorpommern-Greifswald I	Dario Seifert	Anna Kassautzki	37.3%	29,607	39,235	68,842	26,883	9,064	24,635	–	4,814	184,652
16	Mecklenburgische Seenplatte I – Vorpommern-Greifswald II	Enrico Komning	Erik von Malottki	45.2%	42,033	33,050	75,083	22,871	3,787	18,008	–	5,881	166,084
17	Mecklenburgische Seenplatte II – Landkreis Rostock III	Ulrike Schielke-Ziesing	Johannes Arlt	41.1%	34,033	30,808	65,035	31,002	3,370	16,952	–	4,314	158,427

=== Hamburg ===
Party	Constituency			Party list			Total seats	+/–
Party	Votes	%	Seats	Votes	%	Seats	Total seats	+/–
Social Democratic Party (SPD)	292,325	28.0	3	237,740	22.7	0	3	▼2
Christian Democratic Union (CDU)	232,067	22.3	1	216,935	20.7	2	3	Steady
Alliance 90/The Greens (GRÜNE)	214,621	20.6	2	201,713	19.3	1	3	▼1
The Left (DIE LINKE)	129,995	12.5	0	151,115	14.5	2	2	▲1
Alternative for Germany (AfD)	114,714	11.0	0	113,608	10.9	2	2	▲1
Free Democratic Party (FDP)	35,299	3.4	0	47,115	4.5	0	0	▼2
Sahra Wagenknecht Alliance (BSW)				41,919	4.0	0	0	New
Volt Germany	11,921	1.1	0	15,549	1.5	0	0	Steady
Human Environment Animal Protection Party				9,735	0.9	0	0	Steady
Die PARTEI				4,518	0.4	0	0	Steady
Free Voters	9,714	0.9	0	3,866	0.4	0	0	Steady
Bündnis Deutschland				1,279	0.1	0	0	New
Marxist–Leninist Party	1,642	0.2	0	528	0.1	0	0	Steady
Invalid/blank votes	8,507	–	–	5,185	–	–	–	–
Total	1,050,805	100	6	1,050,805	100	7	13	−3
Registered voters/turnout	1,299,289	80.9	–	1,299,289	80.9	–	–	–
Source: Federal Returning Officer

==== Elected members ====
#	CDU	AfD	SPD	Grüne	Linke
Votes	216,782	113,463	237,564	201,761	150,930
%	20.7%	10.9%	22.7%	19.3%	14.4%
Seats	3	2	3	3	2
Constituency seats	Christoph Ploß (C, 28.1%)		Aydan Özoğuz (C, 32.3%); Metin Hakverdi (C, 32.2%); Falko Droßmann (C, 27.4%)	Dr. Till Steffen (C, 27.8%); Linda Heitmann (C, 27.5%)	
List seats	2. Franziska Hoppermann; 3. Christoph de Vries	1. Dr. Bernd Baumann; 2. Dr. Alexander Wolf		1. Katharina Beck	1. Jan van Aken; 2. Cansu Özdemir
Not elected candidates	4. Dr. Roland Heintze; 5. Clara-Sophie Groß; 6. Dr. Kaja Steffens; 7. Ali Ertan Toprak; 8. Klaus-Peter Kurt Hesse; 9. Laura Aletta Dieball; 10. Dr. Herlind Magdalena Gundelach; 11. Sybille Möller-Fiedler	3. Krzysztof Walczak; 4. Benjamin Mennerich; 5. Peggy Heitmann	1. Wolfgang Schmidt; 4. Dorothee Martin; 6. Lena Haffner; 7. Jens Banerjee; 8. Shewta Sachdeva; 9. Vladislav Litau; 10. Alica Huntemann	4. Emilia Fester; 5. Lenka Brodbeck; 6. Manuel Sarrazin; 7. Christa Möller-Metzger; 8. Sarah Pscherer; 9. Ruth Brovtchenko; 10. Jonas Felix Schultz	3. Insa Tietjen; 4. Thomas Iwan

Notes
(C, 0.0%) – constituency winner and vote share percent; [0] – position in the Land list (if available)

==== Constituency votes ====
#	Constituency	Elected member	Previous member	Vote share of winner %	Winning margin	SPD	Union	Grüne	Linke	AfD	FDP	BSW	Total
18	Hamburg-Mitte	Falko Droßmann	Falko Droßmann	27.4%	11,192	51,536	31,829	40,344	31,014	19,898	6,539	–	187,751
19	Hamburg-Altona	Linda Heitmann	Linda Heitmann	27.5%	6,439	36,910	33,392	43,349	25,270	11,902	5,278	–	157,538
20	Hamburg-Eimsbüttel	Till Steffen	Till Steffen	27.8%	3,046	42,720	34,476	45,766	20,727	12,671	6,658	–	164,572
21	Hamburg-Nord	Dr. Christoph Ploß	Dorothee Martin	28.1%	2,758	50,336	53,094	42,876	14,915	15,266	7,028	–	189,066
22	Hamburg-Wandsbek	Aydan Özoğuz	Aydan Özoğuz	32.3%	13,663	57,591	43,928	23,210	18,926	25,873	5,710	–	178,142
23	Hamburg-Bergedorf – Harburg	Metin Hakverdi	Metin Hakverdi	32.2%	17,742	52,896	35,154	19,091	18,994	28,958	4,152	–	164,458

=== Lower Saxony ===
Party	Constituency			Party list			Total seats	+/–
Party	Votes	%	Seats	Votes	%	Seats	Total seats	+/–
Christian Democratic Union (CDU)	1,558,417	31.1	15	1,410,418	28.1	6	21	▲3
Social Democratic Party (SPD)	1,469,704	29.4	15	1,153,523	23.0	2	17	▼9
Alternative for Germany (AfD)	881,225	17.6	0	894,540	17.8	13	13	▲7
Alliance 90/The Greens (GRÜNE)	487,326	9.7	0	576,845	11.5	8	8	▼5
The Left (DIE LINKE)	321,569	6.4	0	405,519	8.1	6	6	▲3
Free Democratic Party (FDP)	148,320	3.0	0	205,163	4.1	0	0	▼8
Sahra Wagenknecht Alliance (BSW)				189,376	3.8	0	0	New
Human Environment Animal Protection Party	7,649	0.2	0	58,107	1.2	0	0	Steady
Free Voters	68,432	1.4	0	37,628	0.8	0	0	Steady
Volt Germany	40,077	0.8	0	30,488	0.6	0	0	Steady
Die PARTEI	4,541	0.1	0	22,360	0.4	0	0	Steady
Grassroots Democratic Party of Germany	4,126	0.1	0	12,466	0.2	0	0	Steady
Pirate Party Germany	2,151	0.0	0	8,029	0.2	0	0	Steady
Bündnis Deutschland	4,332	0.1	0	6,290	0.1	0	0	New
Party of Humanists				3,342	0.1	0	0	Steady
Marxist–Leninist Party	1,334	0.0	0	1,242	0.0	0	0	Steady
Independents & voter groups	6,012	0.1	0				0	–
Invalid/blank votes	36,097	–	–	25,976	–	–	–	–
Total	5,041,312	100	30	5,041,312	100	35	65	−9
Registered voters/turnout	6,043,412	83.4	–	6,043,412	83.4	–	–	–
Source: Federal Returning Officer

==== Elected members ====
#	CDU	AfD	SPD	Grüne	Linke
Votes	1,409,499	894,057	1,152,824	576,371	405,229
%	28.1%	17.8%	23.0%	11.5%	8.1%
Seats	21	13	17	8	6
Constituency seats	Silvia Breher (C, 45.8%) [30]; Albert Stegemann (C, 43.9%) [29]; Gitta Connemann (C, 40.5%) [02]; Lutz Brinkmann (C, 36.6%) [21]; Vanessa-Kim Zobel (C, 36.3%) [15]; Andreas Mattfeldt (C, 35.9%) [09]; Axel Knoerig (C, 35.4%) [18]; Henning Otte (C, 35.2%) [12]; Dr. Hendrik Hoppenstedt (C, 34.8%) [03]; Dr. Cornell-Anette Babendererde (C, 33.2%) [13]; Christoph Frauenpreiß (C, 32.7%) [20]; Alexander Jordan (C, 30.9%) [22]; Dr. Mathias Middelberg (C, 29.7%) [01]; Bastian Ernst (C, 29.3%) [25]; Fritz Güntzler (C, 29.1%) [05]		Lars Klingbeil (C, 42.1%) [01]; Johann Saathoff (C, 41.2%) [11]; Boris Pistorius (C, 36.2%) [03]; Siemtje Möller (C, 35.4%) [02]; Dennis Rohde (C, 34.4%) [09]; Adis Ahmetovic (C, 34.1%) [25]; Hubertus Heil (C, 33.9%) [05]; Dr. Christos Pantazis (C, 33.4%) [19]; Johannes Schraps (C, 33.0%) [15]; Dr. Matthias Miersch (C, 31.8%) [07]; Marja-Liisa Völlers (C, 31.7%) [10]; Daniela Rump (C, 30.7%) [20]; Dunja Kreiser (C, 30.6%) [12]; Frauke Heiligenstadt (C, 30.4%) [08]; Jakob Blankenburg (C, 27.8%) [13]		
List seats	4. Anne Janssen; 6. Tilman Kuban; 7. Mareike Wulf; 8. Carsten Müller; 10. Vivian Tauschwitz; 11. Stephan Albani	1. Dirk Brandes; 2. Jörn König; 3. Martin Sichert; 4. Danny Meiners; 5. Angela Rudzka; 6. Andreas Paul; 7. Micha Fehre; 8. Marcel Queckemeyer; 9. Stefan Henze; 10. Mirco Hanker; 11. Olaf Hilmer; 12. Rocco Kever; 13. Martina Uhr	4. Anja Troff-Schaffarzyk; 6. Svenja Stadler	1. Filiz Polat; 2. Helge Limburg; 3. Dr. Julia Verlinden; 4. Swantje Michaelsen; 5. Dr. Lena Gumnior; 6. Timon Dzienus; 7. Karoline Otte; 8. Dr. Alaa Alhamwi	1. Heidi Reichinnek; 2. Cem Ince; 3. Maren Kaminski; 4. Maik Brückner; 5. Anne-Mieke Bremer; 6. Jorrit Bosch
Not elected candidates	14. Dr. Reza Asghari; 16. Marian Meyer; 17. Michaela Rosemarie Menschel; 19. Dr. Joachim Lübbo Kleen; 23. Justus Lüder; 24. Dr. Constantin Weigel; 26. Dr. Fabian Becker; 27. Dr. Marco Schulze; 28. Matthias Florian Wehrung; 31. Barbara Maria Weißenborn; 32. Uwe Dorendorf; 33. Annelene Bornmann; 34. Carsten Höttcher; 35. Kerstin Biedermann; 36. Wilke Held; 37. Yvonne Niemeyer; 38. Christoph-Michael Molnar; 39. Elena Brunke; 40. David Artschwager; 41. Heike Benecke; 42. Niklas Howad; 43. Klara Horst; 44. Corinna Maria Martens; 45. Andreas Weber; 46. Anja Grages; 47. Simon Johannes Göhler; 48. Andrea Christine Risius; 49. Christian Horend; 50. Franziska Poll; 51. Rudolf Johann Meyer; 52. Lucia Reinert; 53. Nesrin Göktas; 54. Luis Luca Lütgering; 55. Vanessa Storre; 56. Olaf Werner; 57. Dr. Alexandra Eileen Wenck; 58. Silke Kollster; 59. Magnus Bruno Hirschfeld; 60. Simone Göhner; 61. Ulf-Fabian Heinrichsdorff; 62. Anja Susanne Thiede; 63. Max Lemm; 64. Brigitte Neumann; 65. Rene Awad; 66. Kathrin Fündeling; 67. Frank Dieter Germeshausen; 68. Ulrike Scholz-Benedictus; 69. Leon Zakfeld; 70. Mareike Witte	14. Sven Horst Sager; 15. Cornelius Volker; 16. Carsten Wolfgang Vogel; 17. Lidia Bernhardt; 18. Susanne Rosilius; 19. Sebastian Sieg; 20. Jens Glinka; 21. Peter Kühn; 22. Michael Werner Teixeira Gonçalves; 23. Otto Diederich Cornelius; 24. Kay-Helge Kanstein; 25. Erik Heß	14. Anke Hennig; 16. Rebecca Schamber; 17. Daniel Schneider; 18. Dr. Daniela De Ridder; 21. Alexander Bartz; 22. Peggy Schierenbeck; 23. Thomas Vaupel; 24. Özge Kadah; 26. Anna Hohmann; 27. Benjamin Stern; 28. Frauke Johanna Langen; 29. Dr. Thorsten Heinze; 30. Eva Maria Suerkamp; 31. Hamza Atilgan; 32. Inga Wahrmaker; 33. Gregor Szorec; 34. Michaela Römmeler; 35. Jens-Uwe Schütte; 36. Dr. Karin Weber-Klatt; 37. Marek Wischnewski; 38. Annekatrin Wolff-Meuter; 39. Daniel Schweer; 40. Monika Hirdes; 41. Gregory Marcel Mouanga; 42. Karoline Feldmann; 43. Sebastian Brandt; 44. Barbara Fahncke; 45. Pascal Seidel; 46. Christiane Josefine Priester; 47. Patrick Roiss; 48. Annett Eine; 49. Philipp Neessen; 50. Maria Ontina Winter; 51. Simon Fischer; 52. Ida Oks; 53. Jannes Wiesner; 54. Heike Ursula Bade; 55. Jonathan Erdbrink; 56. Janine Meyer; 57. Jan Edward Podyma; 58. Nina Siavwapa; 59. Dominik Schmengler; 60. Nicole Helga Piechotta; 61. Luca Tom Thieme; 62. Jarla Gebauer; 63. Olaf Abdinghoff-Feldkemper; 64. Anna-Lena Fischer; 65. Jean-Pascale Schramke; 66. Jessica Herzberg; 67. Roland Hecker; 68. Isabel Antonia Rother; 69. Holger Jens Robbe; 70. Josephine Emily Kiecol; 71. Tim Tietz; 72. Nadine Wills; 73. Christian Krug; 74. Sandra Primke; 75. Maik Strecker; 76. Alexandra Dzaack; 77. Frederik Roth; 78. Saskia Pauls	9. Christina-Johanne Schröder; 10. Julian Nils Christoph Pahlke; 11. Lisa-Marie Jalyschko; 12. Ottmar Wilhelm von Holtz; 13. Luca Theresa Wirkus; 14. Christopher Jesse; 15. Lena Krause; 16. Joachim Fuchs; 17. Jessica Peine; 18. Gunnar Karl Heinrich Ott; 19. Canina Gloria-Maria Ruzicka; 20. Ulrike Maus; 21. Nadja Johanne Allmers-Plump; 22. Sven Marcell Frings-Michalek; 23. Ann-Sophie Wiek; 24. Michael Steinke; 25. Hayat Hajjali; 26. Daniel Oliver Beer; 27. Claudia Görtzen; 28. Danny Prieske; 29. Frerk Meyer; 30. Thomas Heidemann; 31. Marcel Richter	7. Marianne Esders; 8. Viktor Linsel; 9. Manuela Mast; 10. Erik Frerker; 11. Emma Müller; 12. Steffen Wetzel

Notes
(C, 0.0%) – constituency winner and vote share percent; [0] – position in the Land list (if available)

==== Constituency votes ====
#	Constituency	Elected member	Previous member	Vote share of winner	Winning margin	Union	SPD	AfD	Grüne	Linke	FDP	BSW	Total
24	Aurich – Emden	Johann Saathoff	Johann Saathoff	41.2%	29,496	34,069	63,565	31,160	7,791	8,949	3,569	–	154,427
25	Unterems	Gitta Connemann	Gitta Connemann	40.5%	35,485	79,773	44,288	40,000	13,738	10,835	4,977	–	196,843
26	Friesland – Wilhelmshaven – Wittmund	Siemtje Möller	Siemtje Möller	35.4%	12,824	40,089	52,913	29,525	8,630	8,246	3,974	–	149,629
27	Oldenburg – Ammerland	Dennis Rohde	Dennis Rohde	34.4%	20,107	46,173	66,280	25,045	28,728	15,673	5,996	–	192,716
28	Delmenhorst – Wesermarsch – Oldenburg-Land	Bastian Ernst	Susanne Mittag	29.3%	5,133	53,760	48,627	35,329	18,021	12,645	10,206	–	183,538
29	Cuxhaven – Stade II	Christoph Frauenpreiß	Daniel Schneider	32.7%	3,480	50,395	46,915	30,472	11,030	7,968	4,166	–	154,033
30	Stade I – Rotenburg II	Vanessa-Kim Zobel	Oliver Grundmann	36.3%	17,908	60,301	42,393	29,890	16,205	10,350	4,663	–	165,902
31	Mittelems	Albert Stegemann	Albert Stegemann	43.8%	38,270	86,795	48,525	27,994	14,462	10,171	6,904	–	198,319
32	Cloppenburg – Vechta	Silvia Breher	Silvia Breher	45.8%	46,875	85,241	32,515	38,366	11,280	9,485	6,135	–	185,976
33	Diepholz – Nienburg I	Axel Knoerig	Axel Knoerig	35.4%	12,599	56,910	44,311	27,353	13,005	9,613	5,318	–	160,959
34	Osterholz – Verden	Andreas Mattfeldt	Andreas Mattfeldt	35.9%	18,358	59,321	40,963	28,052	18,449	11,071	4,952	–	165,063
35	Rotenburg I – Heidekreis	Lars Klingbeil	Lars Klingbeil	42.1%	20,414	37,770	58,184	26,667	7,411	–	3,261	–	138,252
36	Harburg	Cornell-Anette Babendererde	Svenja Stadler	33.2%	11,976	57,718	45,742	28,906	18,423	10,309	6,047	–	173,958
37	Lüchow-Dannenberg – Lüneburg	Jakob Blankenburg	Jakob Blankenburg	27.8%	2,276	40,541	42,817	23,895	25,243	10,925	3,894	–	153,887
38	Osnabrück-Land	Lutz Brinkmann	André Berghegger	36.6%	20,560	60,954	40,394	29,983	16,759	9,516	4,914	–	166,609
39	Stadt Osnabrück	Mathias Middelberg	Manuel Gava	29.7%	2,468	47,728	45,260	18,264	21,953	18,862	4,178	–	160,516
40	Nienburg II – Schaumburg	Marja-Liisa Völlers	Marja-Liisa Völlers	31.7%	4,872	44,786	49,658	31,459	11,724	8,669	4,383	–	156,407
41	Stadt Hannover I	Adis Ahmetovic	Adis Ahmetovic	34.1%	15,850	32,818	48,668	18,719	22,397	12,063	3,994	–	142,696
42	Stadt Hannover II	Boris Pistorius	Yasmin Fahimi	36.2%	27,050	28,168	57,216	16,190	30,166	17,908	3,769	–	158,065
43	Hannover-Land I	Hendrik Hoppenstedt	Rebecca Schamber	34.8%	14,171	66,483	52,312	33,139	18,119	10,430	5,101	–	190,964
44	Celle – Uelzen	Henning Otte	Henning Otte	35.2%	21,054	61,114	40,060	34,961	16,097	10,277	5,920	–	173,622
45	Gifhorn – Peine	Hubertus Heil	Hubertus Heil	33.9%	11,015	50,970	61,985	38,892	11,760	9,063	4,714	–	182,616
46	Hameln-Pyrmont – Holzminden	Johannes Schraps	Johannes Schraps	33.0%	6,371	41,013	47,384	29,980	10,269	7,728	4,623	–	143,614
47	Hannover-Land II	Matthias Miersch	Matthias Miersch	31.8%	3,389	59,006	62,395	33,775	17,550	10,882	4,924	–	196,472
48	Hildesheim	Daniela Rump	Bernd Westphal	30.7%	2,504	51,421	53,925	31,963	16,511	12,021	4,369	–	175,376
49	Salzgitter – Wolfenbüttel	Dunja Kreiser	Dunja Kreiser	30.6%	3,603	44,807	48,410	33,787	10,910	11,139	3,934	–	158,280
50	Braunschweig	Christos Pantazis	Christos Pantazis	33.4%	13,395	38,156	51,551	20,471	21,983	12,660	4,461	–	154,263
51	Helmstedt – Wolfsburg	Alexander Jordan	Falko Mohrs	30.9%	3,412	43,511	40,099	31,351	9,630	8,687	4,539	–	140,643
52	Goslar – Northeim – Göttingen II	Frauke Heiligenstadt	Frauke Heiligenstadt	30.4%	174	46,699	46,873	30,491	11,922	9,186	3,999	–	154,162
53	Göttingen	Fritz Güntzler	Andreas Philippi	29.1%	6,118	50,738	44,620	24,752	26,770	15,937	6,320	–	174,203

=== Bremen ===
Party	Constituency			Party list			Total seats	+/–
Party	Votes	%	Seats	Votes	%	Seats	Total seats	+/–
Social Democratic Party (SPD)	95,267	27.4	1 (Note: SPD won all 2 constituency seats in Bremen, but lost 1 seat due to insufficient Second vote coverage.)	80,604	23.1	0	1	▼1
Christian Democratic Union (CDU)	78,673	22.7	0	71,573	20.6	1	1	Steady
Alliance 90/The Greens (GRÜNE)	53,287	15.4	0	54,280	15.6	1	1	Steady
Alternative for Germany (AfD)	52,638	15.2	0	52,496	15.1	1	1	▲1
The Left (DIE LINKE)	44,408	12.8	0	51,461	14.8	1	1	▲1
Sahra Wagenknecht Alliance (BSW)				15,114	4.3	0	0	New
Free Democratic Party (FDP)	9,664	2.8	0	12,295	3.5	0	0	▼1
Volt Germany	5,736	1.7	0	3,836	1.1	0	0	Steady
Die PARTEI	2,227	0.6	0	2,582	0.7	0	0	Steady
Free Voters	1,758	0.5	0	1,618	0.5	0	0	Steady
Bündnis Deutschland	1,967	0.6	0	933	0.3	0	0	New
Human World				694	0.2	0	0	Steady
Party for Rejuvenation Research				303	0.1	0	0	Steady
MERA25				260	0.1	0	0	New
Marxist–Leninist Party	736	0.2	0	207	0.1	0	0	Steady
Independents & voter groups	719	0.2	0				0	–
Invalid/blank votes	3,286	–	–	2,110	–	–	–	–
Total	350,366	100	1 (Note: Bremen has 2 constituencies, but 1 remained unallocated.)	350,366	100	4	5	–
Registered voters/turnout	450,564	77.8	–	450,564	77.8	–	–	–
Source: Federal Returning Officer

==== Elected members ====
#	CDU	AfD	SPD	Grüne	Linke
Votes	71,573	52,496	80,604	54,280	51,461
%	20.6%	15.1%	23.1%	15.6%	14.8%
Seats	1	1	1	1	1
Constituency seats			Uwe Schmidt (C, 30.3%) [2]		
List seats	1. Thomas Röwekamp	1. Sergej Minich		1. Dr. Kirsten Kappert-Gonther	1. Doris Achelwilm
Not elected candidates	2. Sandra Schmull; 3. Mario Sander-von Torklus; 4. Jessica Olatokunbo Saidat Gorontzy; 5. Dr. Marc-André Heidelmann	2. Jürgen Hauschild; 3. Arno Heinz Staschewski; 4. Stephan Hilbers; 5. Sebastian Wachsmann	1. Ulrike Hiller (C, 25.2%); 2. Anke Kozlowski; 3. Pascal Lars Robin Schmidt; 4. Luisa Fiona Greenlees; 5. Kevin Lenkeit	2. Michael Labetzke; 3. Josephine Talena Assmus; 4. Emanuel Herold; 5. Elena Schiller; 6. Pascal Poolke	2. Dariush Hassanpour; 3. Anna Fischer; 4. Christian Thomas Gloede; 5. Elena Budimski; 6. Ingo Tebje

Notes
(C, 0.0%) – constituency winner and vote share percent; [0] – position in the Land list (if available)

==== Constituency votes ====
#	Constituency	Elected member	Previous member	Vote share of winner %	Winning margin	SPD	Union	Grüne	AfD	Linke	BSW	FDP	Total
54	Bremen I	None	Sarah Ryglewski	25.2%	12,092	48,663	46,309	36,571	22,752	25,810	–	5,594	193,127
55	Bremen II – Bremerhaven	Uwe Schmidt	Uwe Schmidt	30.3%	14,240	46,604	32,364	16,716	29,886	18,598	–	4,070	153,953

=== Brandenburg ===
Party	Constituency			Party list			Total seats	+/–
Party	Votes	%	Seats	Votes	%	Seats	Total seats	+/–
Alternative for Germany (AfD)	565,718	34.4	8 (Note: AfD won 9 constituency seats in Brandenburg, but lost 1 seat due to insufficient Second vote coverage.)	535,275	32.5	0	8	▲3
Christian Democratic Union (CDU)	332,331	20.2	0	298,048	18.1	4	4	Steady
Social Democratic Party (SPD)	337,040	20.5	1	244,010	14.8	3	4	▼6
Sahra Wagenknecht Alliance (BSW)				176,405	10.7	0	0	New
The Left (DIE LINKE)	189,182	11.5	0	176,224	10.7	3	3	▲1
Alliance 90/The Greens (GRÜNE)	86,006	5.2	0	108,598	6.6	2	2	Steady
Free Democratic Party (FDP)	44,451	2.7	0	53,467	3.2	0	0	▼2
Free Voters	53,057	3.2	0	23,969	1.5	0	0	Steady
Die PARTEI	15,439	0.9	0	14,706	0.9	0	0	Steady
Volt Germany	10,687	0.7	0	11,370	0.7	0	0	Steady
Bündnis Deutschland	3,564	0.2	0	4,147	0.3	0	0	New
Marxist–Leninist Party				1,119	0.1	0	0	Steady
Independents & voter groups	4,718	0.3	0				0	–
Invalid/blank votes	16,488	–	–	11,343	–	–	–	–
Total	1,658,681	100	9 (Note: Brandenburg has 10 constituencies, but 1 remained unallocated.)	1,658,681	100	12	21	−4
Registered voters/turnout	2,033,539	81.6	–	2,033,539	81.6	–	–	–
Source: Federal Returning Officer

==== Elected members ====
#	CDU	AfD	SPD	Grüne	Linke
Votes	298,048	535,275	244,010	108,598	176,224
%	18.1%	32.5%	14.8%	6.6%	10.7%
Seats	4	8	4	2	3
Constituency seats		Birgit Bessin (C, 43.0%); Lars Schieske (C, 42.0%); Dr. Götz Frömming (C, 38.9%) [4]; Hannes Gnauck (C, 38.3%) [2]; Rainer Galla (C, 38.2%) [8]; René Springer (C, 36.1%) [1]; Arne Raue (C, 33.6%) [6]; Steffen Kotré (C, 33.6%)	Olaf Scholz (C, 21.8%) [1]		
List seats	1. Uwe Feiler; 2. Knut Abraham; 3. Dr. Saskia Ludwig; 4. Sebastian Steineke		2. Maja Wallstein; 3. Stefan Zierke; 4. Sonja Eichwede	1. Annalena Baerbock; 2. Michael Kellner	1. Christian Görke; 2. Isabelle Vandre; 3. Christin Willnat
Not elected candidates	5. Ulrike Mauersberger; 6. Désirée Schrade; 7. Tabea Gutschmidt; 8. Jana Schimke; 9. Michael Horst Günter Rabes; 10. Rene Kaplick; 11. Larissa Markus; 12. Werner Erich Mundt; 13. Steffen Helbing; 14. Christopher Nowak	Andreas Galau (C, 30.8%); 3. Norbert Kleinwächter; 7. Dr. Philip Zeschmann	5. Hannes Artur Gerhard Walter; 6. Ariane Fäscher; 7. Mathias Papendieck; 8. Wiebke Papenbrock; 9. André Ullrich; 10. Simona Marion Koß; 11. Reyk Schulz; 12. Anja Margarete Soheam; 13. Dr. Oliver Strank; 14. Bianca Karstädt; 15. Jonas Belke; 16. Sandra Nauck; 17. Eric Gallasch; 18. Angelika Gertraude Erika Syring; 19. Finn Kuhne; 20. Annett Jura	3. Dr. Andrea Lübcke; 4. Viviane Cornelia Triems; 5. Linda Weiß; 6. Landelin Winter	4. Robert Kosin; 5. Annabell Rattmann; 6. Daniel Irrgang

Notes
(C, 0.0%) – constituency winner and vote share percent; [0] – position in the Land list (if available)

==== Constituency votes ====
#	Constituency	Elected member	Previous member	Vote share of winner %	Total	AfD	Union	SPD	BSW	Linke	Grüne	FDP	Total
56	Prignitz – Ostprignitz-Ruppin – Havelland I	Götz Frömming	Wiebke Papenbrock	38.9%	21,917	51,213	25,868	29,296	–	13,871	4,033	2,847	131,724
57	Uckermark – Barnim I	Hannes Gnauck	Stefan Zierke	38.3%	26,701	53,912	25,664	27,211	–	17,198	5,459	3,322	140,583
58	Oberhavel – Havelland II	None	Ariane Fäscher	30.8%	12,557	64,557	52,000	41,825	–	19,832	13,889	6,039	209,316
59	Märkisch-Oderland – Barnim II	René Springer	Simona Koß	36.1%	33,231	69,020	34,599	35,789	–	25,447	7,625	4,692	191,125
60	Brandenburg an der Havel – Potsdam-Mittelmark I – Havelland III – Teltow-Fläming I	Arne Raue	Sonja Eichwede	33.6%	12,549	53,611	30,938	41,062	–	17,349	5,956	3,717	159,351
61	Potsdam – Potsdam-Mittelmark II – Teltow-Fläming II	Olaf Scholz	Olaf Scholz	21.8%	2,376	37,796	40,956	43,332	–	27,522	31,629	7,959	199,111
62	Dahme-Spreewald – Teltow-Fläming III	Steffen Kotré	Sylvia Lehmann	33.6%	19,410	66,815	47,405	35,055	–	22,422	10,248	4,967	198,791
63	Frankfurt (Oder) – Oder-Spree	Rainer Galla	Mathias Papendieck	38.2%	25,789	56,620	27,858	30,831	–	16,788	4,463	3,528	148,204
64	Cottbus – Spree-Neiße	Lars Schieske	Maja Wallstein	42.0%	24,428	54,980	22,712	30,552	–	12,818	–	3,558	130,910
65	Elbe-Elster – Oberspreewald-Lausitz	Birgit Bessin	Hannes Walter	43.0%	32,863	57,194	24,331	22,087	–	15,935	2,704	3,822	133,078

=== Saxony-Anhalt ===
Party	Constituency			Party list			Total seats	+/–
Party	Votes	%	Seats	Votes	%	Seats	Total seats	+/–
Alternative for Germany (AfD)	515,634	38.8	7 (Note: AfD won all 8 constituency seats in Saxony-Anhalt, but lost 1 seat due to insufficient Second vote coverage.)	496,110	37.1	0	7	▲3
Christian Democratic Union (CDU)	313,319	23.5	0	256,538	19.2	4	4	Steady
Sahra Wagenknecht Alliance (BSW)				150,411	11.2	0	0	New
Social Democratic Party (SPD)	183,951	13.8	0	146,535	11.0	2	2	▼3
The Left (DIE LINKE)	165,818	12.5	0	143,807	10.8	2	2	Steady
Alliance 90/The Greens (GRÜNE)	48,599	3.7	0	59,077	4.4	1	1	Steady
Free Democratic Party (FDP)	37,603	2.8	0	41,251	3.1	0	0	▼2
Free Voters	42,363	3.2	0	18,449	1.4	0	0	Steady
Die PARTEI	5,138	0.4	0	11,038	0.8	0	0	Steady
Volt Germany				8,484	0.6	0	0	Steady
Bündnis Deutschland	8,481	0.6	0	4,517	0.3	0	0	New
Marxist–Leninist Party	1,339	0.1	0	1,132	0.1	0	0	Steady
Independents & voter groups	8,299	0.6	0				0	–
Invalid/blank votes	17,293	–	–	10,488	–	–	–	–
Total	1,347,837	100	7 (Note: Saxony-Anhalt has 8 constituencies, but 1 remained unallocated.)	1,347,837	100	9	16	−2
Registered voters/turnout	1,734,719	77.7	–	1,734,837	77.7	–	–	–
Source: Federal Returning Officer

==== Elected members ====
#	CDU	AfD	SPD	Grüne	Linke
Votes	256,538	496,110	146,535	59,077	143,807
%	19.2%	37.1%	11.0%	4.4%	10.8%
Seats	4	7	2	1	2
Constituency seats		Martin Reichardt (C, 44.4%); Kay-Uwe Ziegler (C, 43.8%); Jan Schmidt (C, 43.2%) [2]; Thomas Korell (C, 39.2%) [4]; Dr. Christina Baum (C, 39.0%); Volker Scheurell (C, 38.6%); Claudia Weiss (C, 32.2%) [5]			
List seats	1. Sepp Müller; 2. Dieter Stier; 3. Anna Aeikens; 4. Tino Sorge		1. Martin Kröber; 2. Dr. Franziska Kersten	1. Steffi Lemke	1. Janina Böttger; 2. David Schliesing
Not elected candidates	5. Christoph Bernstiel; 6. Artjom Pusch; 7. Frank Wyszkowski; 8. Gerry Weber; 9. Claudia Schmidt; 10. Stefanie Middendorf; 11. Vivien Theresa Hellwig; 12. Karolin Braunsberger-Reinhold	Alexander Raue (C, 30.6%); 3. Phillipp-Anders Rau; 6. Anna-Lena Titze; 7. Dr. Andreas Rudolf Graudin; 8. Nils Reichenbach; 9. Thomas Mildt; 10. Michaela Kämpfert	3. Eric Eigendorf; 4. Diana Bäse; 5. Dr. Herbert Wollmann; 6. Aick Pietschmann; 7. Florian Fahrtmann; 8. Norman Steigleder	2. Jan Salis; 3. Miriam Bettina Zeller; 4. Peter Dittmann; 5. Kathrin Grub; 6. Marco Beckmann; 7. Sandra Bauer; 8. Eva Kames	3. Nadja Lüttich; 4. Dr. Karsten Lippmann; 5. Doreen Hainich; 6. Dennis Jannack; 7. Gitta-Susann Hartenstein-Wiermann; 8. Michael Scholz

Notes
(C, 0.0%) – constituency winner and vote share percent; [0] – position in the Land list (if available)

==== Constituency votes ====
#	Constituency	Elected member	Previous member	Vote share of winner %	Winning margin	AfD	Union	BSW	SPD	Linke	Grüne	FDP	Total
66	Altmark – Jerichower Land	Thomas Korell	Herbert Wollmann	39.2%	30,234	69,054	38,820	–	28,276	22,147	4,852	6,047	176,206
67	Börde – Salzlandkreis	Jan Schmidt	Franziska Kersten	43.2%	35,042	72,651	37,609	–	22,895	17,753	3,745	4,608	168,205
68	Harz	Christina Baum	Heike Brehmer	39.0%	23,594	59,302	35,708	–	21,243	18,076	4,958	3,405	152,021
69	Magdeburg	Claudia Weiss	Martin Kröber	32.2%	15,731	55,457	39,726	–	29,617	25,560	10,305	4,647	172,048
70	Anhalt – Dessau – Wittenberg	Volker Scheurell	Sepp Müller	38.6%	15,771	67,245	51,474	–	18,255	17,745	8,426	3,715	174,318
71	Halle	None	Karamba Diaby	30.6%	14,372	52,546	38,174	–	30,798	27,804	9,366	5,045	171,490
72	Burgenland – Saalekreis	Martin Reichardt	Dieter Stier	44.4%	31,353	69,074	37,721	–	15,653	17,034	3,752	4,612	155,590
73	Mansfeld	Kay-Uwe Ziegler	Robert Farle	43.8%	36,218	70,305	34,087	–	17,214	19,699	3,195	5,524	160,666

=== Berlin ===
2025 German federal election In Berlin

Party	Constituency			Party list			Total seats	+/–
Party	Votes	%	Seats	Votes	%	Seats	Total seats	+/–
The Left (DIE LINKE)	423,549	21.8	4	387,222	19.9	2	6	▲3
Christian Democratic Union (CDU)	413,893	21.3	3	356,099	18.3	2	5	Steady
Alliance 90/The Greens (GRÜNE)	338,231	17.4	3	328,035	16.8	2	5	▼1
Alternative for Germany (AfD)	294,546	15.2	1	296,990	15.2	3	4	▲1
Social Democratic Party (SPD)	326,663	16.8	1	295,182	15.1	3	4	▼2
Sahra Wagenknecht Alliance (BSW)	41,787	2.2	0	129,651	6.7	0	0	New
Free Democratic Party (FDP)	52,575	2.7	0	74,076	3.8	0	0	▼2
Human Environment Animal Protection Party	15,740	0.8	0	29,384	1.5	0	0	Steady
Volt Germany				18,231	0.9	0	0	Steady
Die PARTEI	8,425	0.4	0	12,881	0.7	0	0	Steady
Free Voters	9,141	0.5	0	6,402	0.3	0	0	Steady
Team Todenhöfer	4,694	0.2	0	4,532	0.2	0	0	Steady
Party of Progress				3,423	0.2	0	0	Steady
Bündnis Deutschland	7,464	0.4	0	2,960	0.2	0	0	New
MERA25	658	0.0	0	2,439	0.1	0	0	New
Marxist–Leninist Party	1,244	0.1	0	925	0.0	0	0	Steady
Bürgerrechtsbewegung Solidarität	1,295	0.1	0	676	0.0	0	0	Steady
Socialist Equality Party	73	0.0	0	425	0.0	0	0	Steady
Independents & voter groups	2,660	0.1	0				0	–
Invalid/blank votes	18,539	–	–	11,644	–	–	–	–
Total	1,961,177	100	12	1,961,177	100	12	24	−1
Registered voters/turnout	2,442,042	80.3	–	2,442,042	80.3	–	–	–
Source: Federal Returning Officer

==== Elected members ====
#	CDU	AfD	SPD	Grüne	Linke
Votes	356,099	296,990	295,182	328,035	387,222
%	18.3%	15.2%	15.1%	16.8%	19.9%
Seats	5	4	4	5	6
Constituency seats	Marvin Schulz (C, 30.9%) [4]; Adrian Grasse (C, 30.7%) [3]; Lukas Krieger (C, 26.3%) [6]	Gottfried Curio (C, 29.5%) [2]	Helmut Kleebank (C, 27.5%) [5]	Julia Schneider (C, 25.8%) [11]; Hanna Steinmüller (C, 25.3%) [4]; Dr. Moritz Heuberger (C, 24.7%) [8]	Dr. Gregor Gysi (C, 41.8%) [1]; Pascal Meiser (C, 34.7%) [4]; Ines Schwerdtner (C, 34.0%) [2]; Ferat Koçak (C, 30.0%) [6]
List seats	1. Dr. Jan-Marco Luczak; 2. Dr. Ottilie Klein	1. Beatrix von Storch; 3. Ronald Gläser; 4. Sebastian Maack	1. Ruppert Stüwe; 2. Annika Klose; 3. Hakan Demir	1. Elisabeth Paus; 2. Andreas Audretsch	3. Katalin Gennburg; 5. Stella Merendino
Not elected candidates	5. Franziska Dezember; 7. Kevin Kratzsch; 8. Bernhard Jürgen Schodrowski; 9. Aileen Weibeler; 10. Katharina Trump; 11. Thomas Heilmann	5. Michael Walter Gleichmann; 6. Dr. Ralf-Günther Conradi; 7. Dr. Michael Adam; 8. Stefan Franz Kerker	4. Ana-Maria Trăsnea; 6. Sinem Taşan-Funke; 7. Julian Gregor Holter; 8. Alexandra Wend; 9. Jan Zimmerling; 10. Carmen Sinnokrot; 11. Ben Thomas Schneider; 12. Anna Dethlefsen; 13. Jörg Franz Nowak; 14. Urte Wiemken	3. Nina Elisabeth Stahr; 5. Maren Tepper; 6. Annkatrin Esser; 7. Gollaleh Ahmadi; 9. Elisabeth Giesemann; 10. Katrin Schmidberger; 12. Klara Josephine Schedlich; 13. Aydemir Hacer; 14. Konrad Hickel	7. Pilar Caballero Alvarez; 8. Niklas Schenker; 9. Claudia Engelmann; 10. Hans-Ulrich Riedel

Notes
(C, 0.0%) – constituency winner and vote share percent; [0] – position in the Land list (if available)

==== Constituency votes ====
#	Constituency	Elected member	Previous member	Vote share of winner %	Winning margin	Linke	Union	Grüne	AfD	SPD	BSW	FDP	Total
74	Berlin-Mitte	Hanna Steinmüller	Hanna Steinmüller	25.3%	2,151	38,521	22,933	40,672	13,706	26,816	8,012	4,586	160,822
75	Berlin-Pankow	Julia Schneider	Stefan Gelbhaar	25.8%	5,844	45,010	31,918	50,854	33,179	26,106	–	5,407	196,813
76	Berlin-Reinickendorf	Marvin Schulz	Monika Grütters	30.9%	11,911	15,584	40,867	17,136	23,866	28,956	–	4,737	132,350
77	Berlin-Spandau – Charlottenburg North	Helmut Kleebank	Helmut Kleebank	27.5%	1,895	15,044	34,305	12,217	25,931	36,200	–	4,283	131,520
78	Berlin-Steglitz-Zehlendorf	Adrian Grasse	Thomas Heilmann	30.7%	15,043	15,823	55,398	39,843	18,539	40,355	–	7,382	180,189
79	Berlin-Charlottenburg-Wilmersdorf	Lukas Krieger	Michael Müller	26.3%	3,592	17,861	42,273	38,681	13,870	38,187	–	7,063	160,987
80	Berlin-Tempelhof-Schöneberg	Moritz Heuberger	Kevin Kühnert	24.7%	66	22,399	45,573	45,639	20,626	37,934	–	4,986	185,018
81	Berlin-Neukölln	Ferat Koçak	Hakan Demir	30.0%	14,926	43,413	28,487	16,136	18,893	27,266	–	2,791	144,837
82	Berlin-Friedrichshain-Kreuzberg – Prenzlauer Berg East	Pascal Meiser	Canan Bayram	34.7%	7,278	62,049	17,940	54,771	13,854	23,519	–	4,277	179,057
83	Berlin-Treptow – Köpenick	Gregor Gysi	Gregor Gysi	41.8%	35,926	70,572	23,747	8,081	34,646	14,472	9,494	2,961	168,680
84	Berlin-Marzahn – Hellersdorf	Gottfried Curio	Mario Czaja	29.5%	467	24,895	43,262	6,093	43,729	12,926	12,754	1,871	148,205
85	Berlin-Lichtenberg	Ines Schwerdtner	Gesine Lötzsch	34.0%	18,671	52,378	27,190	8,108	33,707	13,926	11,527	2,231	154,160

=== North Rhine-Westphalia ===
Party	Constituency			Party list			Total seats	+/–
Party	Votes	%	Seats	Votes	%	Seats	Total seats	+/–
Christian Democratic Union (CDU)	3,566,853	34.0	44	3,170,627	30.1	3	47	▲5
Social Democratic Party (SPD)	2,633,792	25.1	17	2,108,434	20.0	14	31	▼18
Alternative for Germany (AfD)	1,720,896	16.4	0	1,770,379	16.8	26	26	▲14
Alliance 90/The Greens (GRÜNE)	1,230,253	11.7	3	1,300,901	12.4	16	19	▼9
The Left (DIE LINKE)	714,177	6.8	0	877,123	8.3	13	13	▲7
Free Democratic Party (FDP)	349,157	3.3	0	462,446	4.4	0	0	▼19
Sahra Wagenknecht Alliance (BSW)	6,515	0.1	0	432,911	4.1	0	0	New
Human Environment Animal Protection Party				133,480	1.3	0	0	Steady
Volt Germany	79,713	0.8	0	68,915	0.7	0	0	Steady
Die PARTEI	33,497	0.3	0	59,077	0.6	0	0	Steady
Free Voters	113,892	1.1	0	52,891	0.5	0	0	Steady
Grassroots Democratic Party of Germany				22,219	0.2	0	0	Steady
Team Todenhöfer	5,089	0.0	0	20,021	0.2	0	0	Steady
Party of Progress	1,282	0.0	0	17,965	0.2	0	0	Steady
Bündnis Deutschland	16,093	0.2	0	13,669	0.1	0	0	New
Values Union	2,849	0.0	0	6,736	0.1	0	0	New
MERA25				4,295	0.1	0	0	New
Marxist–Leninist Party	7,435	0.1	0	4,045	0.0	0	0	Steady
Independents & voter groups	8,936	0.1	0				0	–
Invalid/blank votes	97,311	–	–	61,606	–	–	–	–
Total	10,587,740	100	64	10,587,740	100	72	136	−20
Registered voters/turnout	12,884,209	82.2	–	12,884,209	82.2	–	–	–
Source: Federal Returning Officer

==== Elected members ====
#	CDU	AfD	SPD	Grüne	Linke
Votes	3,170,627	1,770,379	2,108,434	1,300,901	877,123
%	30.1%	16.8%	20.0%	12.4%	8.3%
Seats	47	26	31	19	13
Constituency seats	Anne König (C, 47.9%); Friedrich Merz (C, 47.7%) [01]; Marc Henrichmann (C, 45.6%); Dr. Carsten Linnemann (C, 45.5%); Dr. Norbert Röttgen (C, 43.8%); Christian Haase (C, 43.1%); Caroline Bosbach (C, 42.2%) [41]; Florian Müller (C, 42.1%); Jens Spahn (C, 41.8%); Henning Rehbaum (C, 41.7%); Ralph Brinkhaus (C, 41.6%); Wilfried Oellers (C, 41.5%) [40]; Stefan Rouenhoff (C, 41.2%) [24]; Catarina dos Santos-Wintz (C, 40.1%) [17]; Dr. Martin Plum (C, 40.0%) [28]; Thomas Rachel (C, 39.9%) [09]; Paul Ziemiak (C, 38.8%) [03]; Detlef Seif (C, 38.4%) [35]; Anja Karliczek (C, 37.9%) [04]; Ansgar Heveling (C, 37.8%) [19]; Oliver Pöpsel (C, 37.3%) [33]; Dr. Carsten Brodesser (C, 36.9%) [34]; Dr. Klaus Wiener (C, 36.6%) [42]; Dr. Günter Krings (C, 36.4%) [05]; Carl-Philipp Sassenrath (C, 36.3%) [48]; Thomas Jarzombek (C, 36.1%) [13]; Peter Beyer (C, 35.9%) [32]; Matthias Hauer (C, 35.7%) [10]; Elisabeth Winkelmeier-Becker (C, 35.6%) [02]; Dr. Georg Kippels (C, 35.0%) [27]; Sascha van Beek (C, 34.8%) [46]; Benedikt Büdenbender (C, 34.1%) [29]; Dr. Hendrik Streeck (C, 33.3%); Jürgen Hardt (C, 32.4%) [21]; Armin Laschet (C, 32.3%) [07]; Dr. Oliver Vogt (C, 32.1%) [16]; Kerstin Radomski (C, 32.0%) [15]; Nicklas Kappe (C, 31.7%) [59]; Lars Ehm (C, 31.6%) [53]; Kerstin Vieregge (C, 31.3%) [11]; Dr. Katja Strauss-Köster (C, 30.9%) [30]; Joachim Ebmeyer (C, 30.1%) [22]; Tijen Ataoğlu (C, 28.9%) [36]; Johannes Winkel (C, 28.7%) [12]		Bärbel Bas (C, 39.0%) [2]; Helge Lindh (C, 33.6%) [41]; Hendrik Bollmann (C, 33.5%) [56]; Mahmut Özdemir (C, 33.3%) [60]; Frank Schwabe (C, 33.1%) [23]; Dr. Karl Lauterbach (C, 32.7%); Serdar Yüksel (C, 32.7%) [52]; Sebastian Fiedler (C, 32.6%) [29]; Sabine Poschmann (C, 32.4%) [16]; Michael Thews (C, 32.2%) [43]; Oliver Kaczmarek (C, 31.8%) [11]; Dirk Vöpel (C, 31.4%) [63]; Markus Töns (C, 31.4%) [39]; Jens Peick (C, 30.6%) [55]; Ingo Vogel (C, 30.3%) [59]; Dr. Wiebke Esdar (C, 27.2%) [12]; Sanae Abdi (C, 24.9%) [08]	Sven Lehmann (C, 34.1%) [04]; Sylvia Rietenberg (C, 31.2%) [13]; Katharina Dröge (C, 26.0%) [02]	
List seats	6. Serap Güler; 8. Astrid Timmermann-Fechter; 14. Dr. Stefan Nacke	1. Kay Gottschalk; 2. Fabian Jacobi; 3. Dr. Michael Espendiller; 4. Martin Renner; 5. Rüdiger Lucassen; 6. Matthias Helferich; 7. Sascha Lensing; 8. Tobias Ebenberger; 9. Jochen Haug; 10. Christian Zaum; 11. Dr. Anna Rathert; 12. Stefan Keuter; 13. Dr. Daniel Zerbin; 14. Markus Matzerath; 15. Maximilian Kneller; 16. Knuth Meyer-Soltau; 17. Udo Hemmelgarn; 18. Hauke Finger; 19. Otto Strauß; 20. Peter Bohnhof; 21. Ulrich von Zons; 22. Denis Pauli; 23. Adam Balten; 24. Manuel Krauthausen; 25. Georg Schroeter; 26. Dr. Christian Wirth	1. Dr. Rolf Mützenich; 3. Sebastian Hartmann; 4. Svenja Schulze; 5. Dirk Wiese; 6. Nadine Heselhaus; 7. Daniel Rinkert; 9. Stefan Schwartze; 10. Kerstin Griese; 13. Daniel Walter; 14. Bettina Lugk; 15. Jürgen Coße; 17. Jan Dieren; 18. Claudia Moll; 19. Jens Behrens	1. Britta Haßelmann; 3. Dr. Irene Mihalic; 5. Ursula Schauws; 6. Felix Banaszak; 7. Katrin Uhlig; 8. Dr. Jan-Niclas Gesenhues; 9. Dr. Ophelia Nick; 10. Robin Wagener; 11. Nyke Slawik; 12. Max Lucks; 14. Lukas Benner; 15. Schahina Gambir; 16. Sara Nanni; 17. Lamya Kaddor; 18. Dr. Janosch Dahmen; 19. Sandra Stein	1. Sascha H. Wagner; 2. Cansin Köktürk; 3. Lea Reisner; 4. Ulrich Thoden; 5. Sonja Lemke; 6. Mirze Edis; 7. Kathrin Gebel; 8. Dr. Fabian Fahl; 9. Katrin Fey; 10. Uwe Foullong; 11. Mareike Hermeier; 12. Jan Köstering; 13. Charlotte Neuhäuser
Not elected candidates	18. Michael Breilmann; 20. Simone Tatjana Stehr; 23. Vivienne Roth; 25. Katharina Kotulla; 26. Arnd Hilwig; 31. Kathrin Krause; 37. Dr. Tilman Rademacher; 38. Siegmar Heß; 39. Gisela Maria Manderla; 42. Dr. Klaus Wiener; 43. Christoph Bußmann; 44. Sarah Beckhoff; 45. Hans-Martin Schuster; 47. Britta Feiler; 49. Katrin Schulze Zurmussen; 50. Sascha Christopher Kurth; 51. Dennis Benjamin Schleß; 52. Vanessa Vohs; 54. Florian Fuchs; 55. Gabriele Buß; 56. Michael Depenbrock; 57. Björn Pollmer; 58. Derya Altunok; 60. Dr. Janina Jänsch; 61. Sebastian Wladarz; 62. Dr. Mathias Höschel	27. Dr. Harald Weyel; 28. Bernd Walter Rummler; 29. Marco Paul Vogt; 30. Sebastian Richard Schulze; 31. Yannick Niels Noe; 32. Dr. Frank Schnaack; 33. Johannes Brinkrolf; 34. Klaus Heger; 35. Hans Bernhard Ulrich; 36. Ernst-Friedbert Raulf; 37. Pascal Danny Gasch; 38. Bernhard Bühner; 39. Heinrich Theodor Garbe; 40. Alexander Wibbing	20. Katrin Freiberger; 21. Aaron Spielmanns; 22. Gülistan Yüksel; 24. Sarah Lahrkamp; 25. Ingo Schäfer; 26. Luiza Licina-Bode; 27. Johannes Waldmann; 28. Ye-One Rhie; 30. Dr. Zanda Martens; 31. Pascal Reinhardt; 32. Nezahat Baradari; 33. Inaki Axel Echeverria Stefanski; 34. Jessica Rosenthal; 35. Fabian Golanowsky; 36. Silke Ursula Depta; 37. Dennis Kocker; 38. Andrea Kanonenberg; 40. Elvan Korkmaz-Emre; 42. Ina Spanier-Oppermann; 44. Renan Demirkan; 45. Christoph Nießen; 46. Ute Krupp; 47. Dustin Tix; 48. Timo Schisanowski; 49. Bodo Wißen; 50. Brian Nickholz; 51. Burkhard Blienert; 53. Hinrich Schipper; 54. Albert Ritter; 57. Adis Selimi; 58. Kevin Waldeck; 61. Julien Pascal Thiede; 62. Pat Kreß; 64. Dirk Friedrich Presch; 65. Ulrich Pock; 66. Stefan Heinz Mix; 67. Florian Westerwalbesloh; 68. Claus Günther Homm; 69. Helge Sulfrian; 70. Julian Hördemann; 71. Karsten Gerlach	20. Maik Außendorf; 21. Kathrin Henneberger; 22. Michael Sacher; 23. Anna Katharina di Bari; 24. Sabine Grützmacher; 25. Anja Christiane Liebert; 26. David Neil Nethen; 27. Hannah Sophia Rosenbaum; 28. Moritz Wächter; 29. Sarah Gonschorek; 30. Nelli Foumba Soumaoro; 31. Hanna Hüwe; 32. Stephan Neumann; 33. Anna Kysil; 34. Sebastian Stölting; 35. Katharina Janetta; 36. Olaf Joachim Plotke; 37. Laura Kraft; 38. Christian Schubert; 39. Dr. Franziska Krumwiede-Steiner; 40. Anas Al-Qura'an; 41. Janina Alessa Zensus; 42. Dr. Peter Altenbernd; 43. Elke Zeeb; 44. Dr. Thomas Jalili Tanha; 45. Anja Beiers; 46. Dirk Niemeyer; 47. Petra Kuhlendahl; 48. Tobias Neumann; 49. Rebecca Stümper; 50. Alexandra Schoo	14. Lisa Schubert; 15. Birgit Onori; 16. Till Niklas Sörensen-Siebel; 17. Cornelia Swillus-Knöchel; 18. Dr. Jan Fritz Leopold Siebert; 19. Lif Greta Licht; 20. Florian Müller

Notes
(C, 0.0%) – constituency winner and vote share percent; [0] – position in the Land list (if available)

==== Constituency votes ====
#	Constituency	Elected member	Previous member	Vote share of winner %	Winning margin	Union	SPD	AfD	Grüne	Linke	Total
86	Aachen I	Armin Laschet	Oliver Krischer	32.3%	6,171	45,548	27,722	–	39,377	13,162	140,952
87	Aachen II	Catarina dos Santos-Wintz	Claudia Moll	40.1%	16,794	70,541	53,747	–	13,269	13,330	175,998
88	Heinsberg	Wilfried Oellers	Wilfried Oellers	41.5%	33,840	64,624	29,813	30,784	11,797	8,959	155,555
89	Düren	Thomas Rachel	Thomas Rachel	39.9%	29,142	64,996	35,854	33,137	12,153	9,105	163,100
90	Rhein-Erft-Kreis I	Georg Kippels	Georg Kippels	35.0%	18,288	71,833	53,545	34,348	20,977	13,218	205,356
91	Euskirchen – Rhein-Erft-Kreis II	Detlef Seif	Detlef Seif	38.4%	36,417	78,883	42,466	37,837	19,549	11,457	205,520
92	Cologne I	Sanae Abdi	Sanae Abdi	24.9%	456	37,261	37,717	20,022	30,496	16,894	151,595
93	Cologne II	Sven Lehmann	Sven Lehmann	34.1%	12,933	59,925	35,124	12,775	72,858	18,454	213,387
94	Cologne III	Katharina Dröge	Rolf Mützenich	26.0%	390	32,639	43,307	19,459	43,697	18,806	167,822
95	Bonn	Dr. Hendrik Streeck	Katrin Uhlig	33.3%	17,154	63,973	41,577	15,681	46,819	14,776	192,052
96	Rhein-Sieg-Kreis I	Elisabeth Winkelmeier-Becker	Elisabeth Winkelmeier-Becker	35.6%	26,076	70,350	44,274	34,564	22,219	11,331	197,596
97	Rhein-Sieg-Kreis II	Dr. Norbert Röttgen	Norbert Röttgen	43.8%	47,352	79,639	32,287	25,832	23,157	9,768	181,735
98	Oberbergischer Kreis	Dr. Carsten Brodesser	Carsten Brodesser	36.9%	25,835	62,100	34,869	36,265	14,813	10,064	168,260
99	Rheinisch-Bergischer Kreis	Caroline Bosbach	Hermann-Josef Tebroke	42.2%	42,877	77,301	34,424	22,758	25,245	9,309	183,157
100	Leverkusen – Cologne IV	Dr. Karl Lauterbach	Karl Lauterbach	32.7%	11,719	41,855	53,574	25,439	18,081	14,848	163,771
101	Wuppertal I	Helge Lindh	Helge Lindh	33.6%	14,066	36,841	50,907	27,707	13,033	13,852	151,672
102	Solingen – Remscheid – Wuppertal II	Jürgen Hardt	Ingo Schäfer	32.4%	8,623	55,860	47,237	31,911	14,997	12,886	172,145
103	Mettmann I	Dr. Klaus Wiener	Klaus Wiener	36.6%	23,354	60,813	37,459	26,187	20,705	10,713	166,222
104	Mettmann II	Peter Beyer	Peter Beyer	35.9%	13,983	46,152	32,169	22,097	14,237	8,542	128,626
105	Düsseldorf I	Thomas Jarzombek	Thomas Jarzombek	36.1%	27,752	67,108	39,356	18,227	32,269	13,321	185,665
106	Düsseldorf II	Johannes Winkel	Andreas Rimkus	28.7%	8,543	43,282	34,739	19,574	27,347	14,024	150,605
107	Neuss I	Carl-Philipp Sassenrath	Hermann Gröhe	36.3%	15,840	62,250	46,410	29,039	14,559	12,035	171,560
108	Mönchengladbach	Dr. Günter Krings	Günter Krings	36.4%	14,072	50,331	36,259	25,280	13,648	–	138,447
109	Krefeld I – Neuss II	Ansgar Heveling	Ansgar Heveling	37.8%	25,031	61,543	36,512	23,769	17,840	10,838	162,680
110	Viersen	Dr. Martin Plum	Martin Plum	40.0%	35,605	73,676	38,071	29,425	19,438	11,337	184,152
111	Kleve	Stefan Rouenhoff	Stefan Rouenhoff	41.2%	35,440	74,631	39,191	28,974	16,447	10,755	181,024
112	Wesel I	Sascha van Beek	Rainer Keller	34.8%	11,422	58,854	47,432	29,375	13,786	10,275	169,035
113	Krefeld II – Wesel II	Kerstin Radomski	Jan Dieren	32.0%	2,413	44,412	41,999	23,421	12,133	8,552	138,969
114	Duisburg I	Bärbel Bas	Bärbel Bas	39.0%	21,368	27,748	49,116	22,224	9,830	10,805	125,873
115	Duisburg II	Mahmut Özdemir	Mahmut Özdemir	33.3%	7,286	21,791	36,731	29,445	7,599	9,976	110,430
116	Oberhausen – Wesel III	Dirk Vöpel	Dirk Vöpel	31.4%	6,915	41,519	48,434	32,461	12,638	12,062	154,307
117	Mülheim – Essen I	Sebastian Fiedler	Sebastian Fiedler	32.6%	5,340	41,707	47,047	25,140	13,280	9,854	144,356
118	Essen II	Ingo Vogel	Dirk Heidenblut	30.3%	6,385	27,842	34,227	26,058	9,316	10,655	112,923
119	Essen III	Matthias Hauer	Matthias Hauer	35.7%	17,261	55,807	38,546	18,563	24,617	11,667	156,166
120	Recklinghausen I	Frank Schwabe	Frank Schwabe	33.1%	5,481	36,875	42,356	25,912	8,686	7,544	128,043
121	Recklinghausen II	Lars Ehm	Brian Nickholz	31.6%	3,763	46,217	42,454	30,367	10,574	8,501	146,156
122	Gelsenkirchen	Markus Töns	Markus Töns	31.4%	6,816	28,051	38,118	31,302	7,379	10,246	121,453
123	Steinfurt I – Borken I	Jens Spahn	Jens Spahn	41.8%	32,029	70,066	38,037	25,233	15,800	10,029	167,573
124	Bottrop – Recklinghausen III	Nicklas Kappe	Michael Gerdes	31.7%	3,349	49,625	46,276	32,869	10,249	8,927	156,619
125	Borken II	Anne König	Anne König	47.9%	48,489	82,000	33,511	22,179	16,486	8,742	171,323
126	Coesfeld – Steinfurt II	Marc Henrichmann	Marc Henrichmann	45.6%	42,667	76,819	34,152	20,615	21,571	7,708	168,529
127	Steinfurt III	Anja Karliczek	Anja Karliczek	37.9%	20,856	62,253	41,397	25,484	19,383	9,868	164,468
128	Münster	Sylvia Rietenberg	Maria Klein-Schmeink	31.2%	5,532	58,996	42,553	13,426	64,528	14,083	206,815
129	Warendorf	Henning Rehbaum	Henning Rehbaum	41.7%	36,473	72,720	36,247	27,935	18,940	9,798	174,527
130	Gütersloh I	Ralph Brinkhaus	Ralph Brinkhaus	41.6%	39,144	79,373	40,229	32,673	17,268	10,489	190,902
131	Bielefeld – Gütersloh II	Wiebke Esdar	Wiebke Esdar	27.2%	2,388	50,742	53,130	27,995	31,274	19,802	195,394
132	Herford – Minden-Lübbecke II	Joachim Ebmeyer	Stefan Schwartze	30.1%	1,677	54,253	52,576	38,341	12,899	10,740	180,095
133	Minden-Lübbecke I	Oliver Vogt	Achim Post	32.1%	12,044	51,975	39,931	35,399	15,008	9,061	161,692
134	Lippe I	Kerstin Vieregge	Jürgen Berghahn	31.3%	14,088	56,640	42,552	39,427	21,911	10,896	180,757
135	Höxter – Lippe II	Christian Haase	Christian Haase	43.1%	31,727	60,581	26,226	28,854	10,482	7,421	140,437
136	Paderborn	Carsten Linnemann	Carsten Linnemann	45.5%	51,905	86,833	29,097	34,928	20,143	11,949	190,870
137	Hagen – Ennepe-Ruhr-Kreis I	Tijen Ataoğlu	Timo Schisanowski	28.9%	4,982	44,170	39,188	32,643	12,584	9,095	152,872
138	Ennepe-Ruhr-Kreis II	Dr. Katja Strauss-Köster	Axel Echeverria	30.9%	1,199	43,775	42,576	23,488	14,587	8,617	141,685
139	Bochum I	Serdar Yüksel	Axel Schäfer	32.7%	13,082	39,925	53,007	22,797	22,181	15,273	162,128
140	Herne – Bochum II	Hendrik Bollmann	Michelle Müntefering	33.5%	12,800	31,032	43,832	28,088	11,111	10,878	130,681
141	Dortmund I	Jens Peick	Jens Peick	30.6%	11,331	38,929	50,260	26,057	22,994	15,048	164,087
142	Dortmund II	Sabine Poschmann	Sabine Poschmann	32.4%	11,662	37,891	49,553	28,240	15,742	13,794	152,770
143	Unna I	Oliver Kaczmarek	Oliver Kaczmarek	31.8%	3,176	46,509	49,685	29,070	14,059	9,491	156,059
144	Hamm – Unna II	Michael Thews	Michael Thews	32.2%	3,911	54,186	58,097	38,828	11,476	12,865	180,238
145	Soest	Oliver Pöpsel	Hans-Jürgen Thies	37.3%	27,943	70,487	42,544	36,727	18,133	11,144	189,021
146	Hochsauerlandkreis	Friedrich Merz	Friedrich Merz	47.7%	43,179	78,259	35,080	26,087	10,024	7,655	163,998
147	Siegen-Wittgenstein	Benedikt Büdenbender	Volkmar Klein	34.1%	16,003	56,827	40,824	34,138	12,486	10,735	166,792
148	Olpe – Märkischer Kreis I	Florian Müller	Florian Müller	42.1%	34,601	68,241	33,640	32,358	10,191	8,231	161,932
149	Märkischer Kreis II	Paul Ziemiak	Paul Ziemiak	38.8%	24,446	58,968	34,522	31,658	9,878	9,917	151,800

=== Saxony ===
Party	Constituency			Party list			Total seats	+/–
Party	Votes	%	Seats	Votes	%	Seats	Total seats	+/–
Alternative for Germany (AfD)	986,060	38.5	14 (Note: AfD won 15 constituency seats in Saxony, but lost 1 seat due to insufficient Second vote coverage.)	958,401	37.3	0	14	▲4
Christian Democratic Union (CDU)	612,826	23.9	0	507,247	19.7	7	7	Steady
The Left (DIE LINKE)	326,830	12.8	1	290,462	11.3	3	4	Steady
Sahra Wagenknecht Alliance (BSW)	79,556	3.1	0	232,257	9.0	0	0	New
Social Democratic Party (SPD)	247,349	9.7	0	217,144	8.5	3	3	▼5
Alliance 90/The Greens (GRÜNE)	129,025	5.0	0	167,269	6.5	2	2	▼2
Free Democratic Party (FDP)	69,629	2.7	0	83,436	3.2	0	0	▼5
Free Voters	71,775	2.8	0	40,139	1.6	0	0	Steady
Human Environment Animal Protection Party				29,743	1.2	0	0	Steady
Volt Germany	10,766	0.4	0	14,741	0.6	0	0	Steady
Die PARTEI	12,288	0.5	0	13,692	0.5	0	0	Steady
Bündnis Deutschland	11,666	0.5	0	7,435	0.3	0	0	New
Pirate Party Germany				4,018	0.2	0	0	Steady
Party of Humanists	1,258	0.0	0	2,472	0.1	0	0	Steady
Marxist–Leninist Party	772	0.0	0	1,116	0.0	0	0	Steady
Independents & voter groups	2,975	0.1	0				0	–
Invalid/blank votes	22,002	–	–	15,205	–	–	–	–
Total	2,584,777	100	15 (Note: Saxony has 16 constituencies, but 1 remained unallocated.)	2,584,777	100	15	30	−8
Registered voters/turnout	3,186,780	81.1	–	3,186,780	81.1	–	–	–
Source: Federal Returning Officer

==== Elected members ====
#	CDU	AfD	SPD	Grüne	Linke
Votes	507,247	958,401	217,144	167,269	290,462
%	19.7%	37.3%	8.5%	6.5%	11.3%
Seats	7	14	3	2	4
Constituency seats		Steffen Janich (C, 49.1%) [7]; Tino Chrupalla (C, 48.9%) [1]; Karsten Hilse (C, 48.3%) [2]; Thomas Dietz (C, 46.7%); Carolin Bachmann (C, 45.4%) [3]; Christian Reck (C, 45.3%); Dr. Maximilian Krah (C, 44.2%); René Bochmann (C, 43.8%) [10]; Mathias Weiser (C, 43.3%) [14]; Matthias Moosdorf (C, 39.9%) [9]; Edgar Naujok (C, 38.2%); Dr. Eberhardt Alexander (C, 32.2%) [6]; Matthias Rentzsch (C, 29.9%); Thomas Ladzinski (C, 29.4%) [4]			Sören Pellmann (C, 36.8%) [1]
List seats	1. Carsten Körber; 2. Dr. Christiane Schenderlein; 3. Dr. Markus Reichel; 4. Jens Lehmann; 5. Nora Seitz; 6. Lars Rohwer; 7. Florian Oest		1. Susanne Kathrin Michel; 2. Holger Mann; 3. Rasha Nasr	1. Dr. Paula Piechotta; 2. Kassem Taher Saleh	2. Caren Lay; 3. Clara Bünger; 4. Zada Salihović
Not elected candidates	8. Katrin Sophie Pojar; 9. Peter Darmstadt; 10. Katharina Wagner; 11. Steffen Roschek; 12. Alexander Gerd Krauß; 13. Birgit Elsner; 14. Dietmar Link; 15. Alexa Freifrau Spies von Büllesheim; 16. Titus Reime; 17. Jörg Gerd Werner Heuter; 18. Stefanie Franzl; 19. Johann Haupt; 20. Lenny Roth; 21. Heike Diebler; 22. Gerald Otto; 23. Simone Meyer-Götz; 24. Lennart Schorch; 25. Anne Buder; 26. Klaus Petersen	5. Christian Kriegel (C, 25.0%); 8. Carsten Hütter; 11. Christoph Neumann; 12. Heike Winter; 13. Frank Dirk Gottschalk; 15. Dr. Stephan Waidmann; 16. René Hein	4. Detlef Müller; 5. Nadja Sthamer; 6. Carlos Kasper; 7. Franziska Mascheck; 8. Fabian Funke; 9. Jens Juraschka; 10. Harald Holger Prause-Kosubek; 11. Heiko Wittig; 12. Dr. Silvio Heider; 13. Leonhard Bernd Weist; 14. Maik Linke	3. Merle Spellerberg; 4. Bernhard Herrmann; 5. Monique Hänel; 6. Olaf Horlbeck; 7. Coretta Storz; 8. Ahmed Béjaoui; 9. Ronja Zierold; 10. Frank Schmidt	5. Nicole Weichhold; 6. Marten Richard Henning; 7. Nina Treu; 8. Jens Kretzschmar; 9. Jennifer Wolf; 10. Simon Zwintzscher; 11. Funda Römer; 12. Paul Saupe; 13. Anna Becker; 14. Jannik Starcke; 15. Jessica Hamann

Notes
(C, 0.0%) – constituency winner and vote share percent; [0] – position in the Land list (if available)

==== Constituency votes ====
#	Constituency	Elected member	Previous member	%	Margin	AfD	Union	Linke	BSW	SPD	Grüne	FDP	Total
150	Nordsachsen	René Bochmann	René Bochmann	43.8%	23,626	55,024	31,398	10,502	–	12,554	3,090	2,684	125,726
151	Leipzig I	None	Jens Lehmann	25.0%	6,353	45,730	39,286	39,377	11,727	21,472	13,796	3,828	182,962
152	Leipzig II	Sören Pellmann	Sören Pellmann	36.8%	35,262	36,549	31,270	71,811	10,113	16,615	19,954	3,987	195,163
153	Leipzig-Land	Edgar Naujok	Edgar Naujok	38.2%	23,272	65,318	42,046	14,944	10,899	18,676	6,053	4,395	171,024
154	Meißen	Christian Reck	Barbara Lenk	45.3%	33,523	70,572	37,049	14,695	–	11,413	6,529	8,223	155,698
155	Bautzen I	Karsten Hilse	Karsten Hilse	48.3%	38,696	77,339	38,643	15,654	–	11,384	3,484	4,199	160,216
156	Görlitz	Tino Chrupalla	Tino Chrupalla	48.9%	37,950	75,147	37,197	9,795	9,832	9,626	4,659	2,952	153,777
157	Sächsische Schweiz-Osterzgebirge	Steffen Janich	Steffen Janich	49.1%	41,940	77,901	35,961	14,523	–	12,766	4,751	4,478	158,742
158	Dresden I	Thomas Ladzinski	Markus Reichel	29.4%	3,813	53,853	50,040	26,085	–	21,457	19,899	6,229	183,065
159	Dresden II – Bautzen II	Matthias Rentzsch	Lars Rohwer	29.9%	11,131	58,238	47,107	31,961	–	18,245	22,140	5,130	194,778
160	Mittelsachsen	Carolin Bachmann	Carolin Bachmann	45.4%	27,023	66,688	39,665	13,234	–	13,321	3,680	4,284	147,028
161	Chemnitz	Alexander Gauland	Detlef Müller	32.2%	15,533	46,401	30,868	14,349	13,190	24,128	6,554	3,314	144,147
162	Chemnitzer Umland – Erzgebirgskreis II	Maximilian Krah	Mike Moncsek	44.2%	22,723	61,027	38,304	14,229	–	16,139	3,828	4,655	138,182
163	Erzgebirgskreis I	Thomas Dietz	Thomas Dietz	46.7%	35,160	75,876	40,716	11,121	10,288	10,741	2,597	3,579	162,637
164	Zwickau	Matthias Moosdorf	Matthias Moosdorf	39.9%	24,219	59,725	35,506	11,214	13,507	14,837	3,485	4,279	149,640
165	Vogtlandkreis	Mathias Weiser	Yvonne Magwas	43.3%	22,902	60,672	37,770	13,336	–	13,975	4,526	3,413	139,990

=== Hesse ===
Party	Constituency			Party list			Total seats	+/–
Party	Votes	%	Seats	Votes	%	Seats	Total seats	+/–
Christian Democratic Union (CDU)	1,154,330	32.3	15 (Note: CDU won 20 constituency seats in Hesse, but lost 5 seats due to insufficient Second vote coverage.)	1,033,842	28.9	0	15	▲3
Social Democratic Party (SPD)	843,094	23.6	2	657,510	18.4	8	10	▼5
Alternative for Germany (AfD)	633,669	17.7	0	636,778	17.8	9	9	▲4
Alliance 90/The Greens (GRÜNE)	411,127	11.5	0	451,510	12.6	7	7	▼2
The Left (DIE LINKE)	256,907	7.2	0	311,058	8.7	4	4	▲1
Free Democratic Party (FDP)	128,781	3.6	0	180,823	5.0	0	0	▼7
Sahra Wagenknecht Alliance (BSW)				158,653	4.4	0	0	New
Free Voters	80,795	2.3	0	46,567	1.3	0	0	Steady
Human Environment Animal Protection Party	2,772	0.1	0	44,516	1.2	0	0	Steady
Volt Germany	47,890	1.3	0	31,542	0.9	0	0	Steady
Die PARTEI	7,004	0.2	0	18,111	0.5	0	0	Steady
Bündnis Deutschland	3,040	0.1	0	5,740	0.2	0	0	New
Party of Humanists				3,014	0.1	0	0	Steady
Marxist–Leninist Party	1,448	0.0	0	1,170	0.0	0	0	Steady
Independents & voter groups	1,975	0.1	0				0	–
Invalid/blank votes	35,802	–	–	27,800	–	–	–	–
Total	3,608,634	100	17 (Note: Hesse has 22 constituencies, but 5 remained unallocated.)	3,608,634	100	28	45	−6
Registered voters/turnout	4,341,919	83.1	–	4,341,919	83.1	–	–	–
Source: Federal Returning Officer

==== Elected members ====
#	CDU	AfD	SPD	Grüne	Linke
Votes	1,033,842	636,778	657,510	451,510	311,058
%	28.9%	17.8%	18.4%	12.6%	8.7%
Seats	15	9	10	7	4
Constituency seats	Michael Karl Brand (C, 43.3%) [02]; Norbert Altenkamp (C, 39.8%) [10]; Markus Koob (C, 37.8%) [09]; Klaus-Peter Willsch (C, 36.8%) [08]; Dr. Michael Meister (C, 36.3%) [03]; Johannes Volkmann (C, 34.3%) [18]; Johannes Wiegelmann (C, 34.1%) [15]; Patricia Lips (C, 34.0%) [01]; Dr. Thomas Pauls (C, 33.7%) [24]; Wilhelm Gebhard (C, 32.3%) [23]; Pascal Reddig (C, 32.0%) [20]; Björn Simon (C, 31.2%) [12]; Jan-Wilhelm Pohlmann (C, 31.1%) [14]; Dr. Stefan Korbach (C, 30.7%) [26]; Frederik Bouffier (C, 30.4%) [17]		Sören Bartol (C, 30.3%) [01]; Daniel Bettermann (C, 27.7%) [15]		
List seats		1. Jan Nolte; 2. Uwe Schulz; 3. Robin Jünger; 4. Julian Schmidt; 5. Pierre Lamely; 6. Christian Douglas; 7. Thomas Fetsch; 8. Jan Feser; 9. Nicole Hess	2. Dagmar Schmidt; 3. Armand Zorn; 4. Nancy Faeser; 5. Felix Döring; 6. Esther Dilcher; 7. Martin Rabanus; 8. Natalie Pawlik; 9. Dr. Philipp Rottwilm	1. Dr. Anna Lührmann; 2. Omid Nouripour; 3. Deborah Düring; 4. Tarek Al-Wazir; 5. Awet Tesfaiesus; 6. Boris Mijatović; 7. Ayse Asar	1. Janine Wißler; 2. Jörg Cezanne; 3. Violetta Bock; 4. Desiree Becker
Not elected candidates	29. Marcus Kretschmann (C, 30.3%); 4. Anna-Marie Regina Bischof (C, 30.1%); 5. Leopold Born (C, 27.4%); 7. Dr. Astrid Mannes (C, 26.7%); 21. Yannick Schwander (C, 26.0%); 6. Dr. Stefan Heck; 10. Ann Kathrin Linsenhoff; 13. Dr. Katja Silbe; 16. Janna Melzer; 19. Anna Magdalena Ulrike Bunting; 22. Kathrina Elisabeth Wagner; 25. Maren Hildebrand; 27. Dr. Maik Fariborz Behschad; 28. Bettina Margarethe Wiesmann; 30. Kai-Uwe Hemmerich; 31. Dr. Olga Martens; 32. Kevin Schmauß; 33. Susanne Karoline Fritsch; 34. Andreas Kurt Hofmeister; 35. Jana Edelmann-Rauthe; 36. Anne Franziska Jähn; 37. Dr. Steffen Alexander Korell; 38. Inge Cromm; 39. Sabine Lipp; 40. Martin Carlo Giese; 41. Lukas Alexander Brandscheid; 42. Veronica Fabricius; 43. Juliane Eichenberg; 44. Torben Kruhmann; 45. Ingeborg Maria Elise Drossard-Gintner; 46. Dr. Melanie Neeb; 47. Andreas Mock; 48. Albina Nazarenus-Vetter; 49. Michael Weber; 50. Ellen Neumann; 51. Anna-Maria Schölch; 52. Dr. Christian Lannert; 53. Lucie Maier-Frutig; 54. Katrin Walmanns; 55. Hans-Jürgen Schäfer; 56. Lisa Galvagno; 57. Luisa Maria Westhoff; 58. Jonas Kehr; 59. Felicitas Madeleine Beuschel; 60. Apolline Marie Sophie Reimers; 61. Simon Iolin; 62. Anna-Lena Habel-Steinhardt; 63. Rebecca Katharina Craes; 64. Peter Stephan	10. Klaus Dieter Herrmann; 11. Holger Doktorowski; 12. Jürgen Günter Mohn; 13. Dr. Clemens Johannes Hauk; 14. Anja Swars; 15. Ingeborg Horn-Posmyk; 16. Michael Rudolf Kuger; 17. Kurt Gloos; 18. Adrian Joachim Gohla; 19. Berthold Karl Hartmann; 20. Klaus-Peter Flesch	10. Melanie Wegling; 11. Dr. Jens Zimmermann; 12. Nadine Ruf; 13. Jan Lennard Oehl; 14. Christine Ulrike Fischer; 16. Laura Helena Wolf; 17. Andreas Larem; 18. Lena Friederike Voigt; 19. Sven Wingerter; 20. Julia Maiano; 21. Daniel Iliev; 22. Handan Özgüven; 23. David Wade; 24. Michelle Susan Breustedt; 25. Michael Neuner; 26. Laura Altmayer; 27. Lino Rene Leudesdorff; 28. Hella Ayubi; 29. Ilyas Aydrus Yassin; 30. Amelie Sophie Roese; 31. Jan Moritz Böcher; 32. Julia Rausch; 33. Florian Obst; 34. Sahime Dirican; 35. Noah David Schollmeier; 36. Ulrike Huf; 37. Liban Abdirahman Farah; 38. Sina Massow; 39. Christopher Ostrowski; 40. Katrin Raab; 41. Frederik Frimmel; 42. Christel Keim; 43. Tiny Dietmar Hobbs; 44. Lara Maraun; 45. Bernd Klippel; 46. Petra Göbel; 47. Patrick Gebauer; 48. Monika Oertel; 49. Benedict Heybeck; 50. Dr. Dieter Falk; 51. Tuna Firat; 52. Julian Stroh; 53. Frank Bernd Sibert; 54. Wolfgang Friedrich Sax; 55. Niklas Keim; 56. Patrick Tanke; 57. Sven Wellinger; 58. Stephan Martin Müller	8. Andreas Lukas May; 9. Mahwish Iftikhar; 10. Michel Zörb; 11. Ilka Deutschendorf; 12. Maximilian Kohler; 13. Marie-Louise Puls; 14. Philip Holger Schinkel; 15. Panagio Aikaterini Garcia; 16. Joshua Esra Edel; 17. Dr. Doris Jensch; 18. Boris Markus Wilfert; 19. Stephanie Pilar Butte; 20. Isabel Köhler-Hande; 21. Sabine Häuser-Eltgen; 22. Dr. Thomas Cord Gudehus; 23. Fanny Maria Sackis; 24. Dr. Jan Marien; 25. Stefanie Pies; 26. Gregor Michael Beck; 27. Katharina Meixner; 28. Jacob Johannes Spanke; 29. Judith Rauschenberg; 30. Lars Nitschke	5. Naisan Raji; 6. Finn Tizian Köllner; 7. Magdalena Maria Depta-Wollenhaupt; 8. Thomas Völker; 9. Daniel Winter; 10. Silvia Katja Hable; 11. Mariana Helga Schott; 12. Kilian Schüler

Notes
(C, 0.0%) – constituency winner and vote share percent; [0] – position in the Land list (if available)

==== Constituency votes ====
#	Constituency	Elected member	Previous member	%	Margin	Union	SPD	AfD	Grüne	Linke	FDP	Total
166	Waldeck	Jan-Wilhelm Pohlmann	Esther Dilcher	31.1%	4,283	46,166	41,883	31,701	10,559	8,462	4,863	148,440
167	Kassel	Daniel Bettermann	Timon Gremmels	27.7%	5,896	42,004	47,900	28,126	24,338	20,203	4,735	173,095
168	Werra-Meißner – Hersfeld-Rotenburg	Wilhelm Gebhard	Michael Roth	32.3%	6,163	44,173	38,010	30,926	7,357	7,246	3,326	136,968
169	Schwalm-Eder	None	Edgar Franke	30.1%	2,704	45,647	42,943	36,357	8,705	7,974	4,329	151,718
170	Marburg	Sören Bartol	Sören Bartol	30.3%	1,760	44,014	45,774	27,633	13,738	11,452	3,481	151,167
171	Lahn-Dill	Johannes Volkmann	Dagmar Schmidt	34.3%	16,891	56,424	39,533	37,998	11,201	8,677	4,544	164,394
172	Gießen	Frederik Bouffier	Felix Döring	30.4%	4,647	53,851	49,204	33,541	15,276	12,444	4,906	176,938
173	Fulda	Michael Brand	Michael Brand	43.3%	35,249	75,039	23,675	39,790	11,460	7,262	5,969	173,497
174	Main-Kinzig – Wetterau II – Schotten	Johannes Wiegelmann	Bettina Müller	34.1%	13,380	49,611	29,795	36,231	10,738	7,064	4,755	145,304
175	Hochtaunus	Markus Koob	Markus Koob	37.8%	27,803	57,261	29,458	25,045	18,418	8,108	7,275	151,359
176	Wetterau I	Dr. Thomas Pauls	Natalie Pawlik	33.7%	11,737	49,929	38,192	25,930	14,407	7,726	5,766	148,355
177	Rheingau-Taunus – Limburg	Klaus-Peter Willsch	Klaus-Peter Willsch	36.8%	26,547	66,648	40,101	31,379	19,472	9,026	7,660	181,064
178	Wiesbaden	Dr. Stefan Korbach	Ingmar Jung	30.7%	12,300	44,997	32,697	20,406	21,876	15,408	5,944	146,762
179	Hanau	Pascal Reddig	Lennard Oehl	32.0%	9,440	45,346	35,906	27,150	12,134	10,745	5,177	141,899
180	Main-Taunus	Norbert Altenkamp	Norbert Altenkamp	39.8%	36,257	65,495	29,238	21,541	23,001	9,860	8,847	164,564
181	Frankfurt am Main I	None	Armand Zorn	26.0%	400	41,232	40,832	17,067	25,756	20,329	7,418	158,632
182	Frankfurt am Main II	None	Omid Nouripour	27.4%	1,803	52,010	35,101	17,449	50,207	18,780	8,773	190,065
183	Groß-Gerau	None	Melanie Wegling	30.3%	2,060	42,181	40,121	22,816	11,195	12,390	4,667	138,998
184	Offenbach	Björn Simon	Björn Simon	31.2%	15,437	53,821	38,384	26,300	25,416	17,841	6,606	172,527
185	Darmstadt	None	Andreas Larem	26.7%	10,173	53,802	42,398	27,391	43,629	15,384	6,626	201,261
186	Odenwald	Patricia Lips	Jens Zimmermann	34.0%	17,740	65,470	47,730	35,564	17,327	11,704	6,825	192,624
187	Bergstraße	Dr. Michael Meister	Michael Meister	36.3%	24,990	59,209	34,219	33,328	14,917	8,822	6,289	163,201

=== Thuringia ===
Party	Constituency			Party list			Total seats	+/–
Party	Votes	%	Seats	Votes	%	Seats	Total seats	+/–
Alternative for Germany (AfD)	512,070	38.7	7	510,527	38.6	1	8	▲3
Christian Democratic Union (CDU)	272,827	20.6	0	246,065	18.6	4	4	▲1
The Left (DIE LINKE)	209,947	15.9	1	200,688	15.2	2	3	Steady
Sahra Wagenknecht Alliance (BSW)	96,975	7.3	0	124,760	9.4	0	0	New
Social Democratic Party (SPD)	131,842	10.0	0	115,915	8.8	2	2	▼3
Alliance 90/The Greens (GRÜNE)	36,822	2.8	0	56,097	4.2	1	1	Steady
Free Democratic Party (FDP)	28,121	2.1	0	37,292	2.8	0	0	▼2
Free Voters	25,831	2.0	0	20,621	1.6	0	0	Steady
Volt Germany				6,998	0.5	0	0	Steady
Bündnis Deutschland				3,454	0.3	0	0	New
Marxist–Leninist Party	1,678	0.1	0	1,743	0.1	0	0	Steady
Independents & voter groups	7,113	0.5	0				0	–
Invalid/blank votes	10,248	–	–	9,314	–	–	–	–
Total	1,333,474	100	8	1,333,474	100	10	18	−1
Registered voters/turnout	1,652,462	80.7	–	1,652,462	80.7	–	–	–
Source: Federal Returning Officer

==== Elected members ====
#	CDU	AfD	SPD	Grüne	Linke
Votes	246,065	510,527	115,915	56,097	200,688
%	18.6%	38.6%	8.8%	4.2%	15.2%
Seats	4	8	2	1	3
Constituency seats		Stephan Brandner (C, 44.8%) [1]; Prof. Dr. Michael Kaufmann (C, 44.5%) [8]; Robert Teske (C, 42.1%) [5]; Marcus Bühl (C, 41.2%); Christopher Drößler (C, 39.5%) [6]; Stefan Möller (C, 38.5%) [2]; Stefan Schröder (C, 32.5%) [9]			Bodo Ramelow (C, 36.8%) [1]
List seats	1. Christian Hirte; 2. Diana Herbstreuth; 3. David Gregosz; 4. Michael Hose		1. Carsten Schneider; 2. Elisabeth Kaiser	1. Katrin Göring-Eckardt	2. Donata Vogtschmidt; 3. Mandy Eißing
Not elected candidates	5. Tankred Schipanski; 6. Hendrik Blose; 7. Cornelius Golembiewski; 8. Lilly Krahner; 9. Katrin Götz; 10. Marion Anne Noori; 11. Konstantin Müller; 12. Andreas Kinder; 13. Gurdeep Singh Randhawa; 14. Lilia Rau; 15. Manuel-Dominik Holzhauer; 16. Hans-Arno Simon	3. Torben Braga; 4. Andreas Leupold; 7. Alexander Claus	3. Dr. Holger Becker; 4. Tina Rudolph; 5. Raimund Meß; 6. Mohamed Fayez Ahmed Sayed; 7. Florian Wagner; 8. Bastian Lutz Günter Dohna; 9. David Starke; 10. Alexander Meinhardt-Heib; 11. Siegfried Hugo Heinrich Eger	2. Madeleine Henfling; 3. Dr. Astrid Matthey; 4. Pascal Leibbrandt; 5. Heike Erika Strecker; 6. Dr. Heiko Knopf; 7. Kai Ernst Ralf Klemm-Lorenz; 8. Manfred Robert Kröber	4. Frank Tempel; 5. Jessica Tischer; 6. Michael Lemm; 7. Carolin Held; 8. Daniel Starost; 9. Hannes Obenauf; 10. Sebastian Freimund Bach

Notes
(C, 0.0%) – constituency winner and vote share percent; [0] – position in the Land list (if available)

==== Constituency votes ====
#	Constituency	Elected member	Previous member	%	Margin	AfD	Union	Linke	BSW	SPD	Grüne	FDP	Total
188	Eichsfeld – Nordhausen – Kyffhäuserkreis	Christopher Drößler	Manfred Grund	39.5%	19,305	65,033	45,728	19,527	12,712	14,361	3,000	3,815	164,518
189	Eisenach – Wartburgkreis – Unstrut-Hainich-Kreis	Stefan Möller	Klaus Stöber	38.5%	25,159	61,095	35,936	16,030	12,824	18,892	3,882	2,345	158,649
190	Jena – Sömmerda – Weimarer Land I	Stefan Schröder	Holger Becker	32.5%	20,756	52,003	29,661	31,247	11,453	18,734	9,587	3,655	160,088
191	Gotha – Ilm-Kreis	Marcus Bühl	Marcus Bühl	41.2%	31,009	60,354	29,345	18,753	11,660	14,681	4,403	2,998	146,632
192	Erfurt – Weimar – Weimarer Land II	Bodo Ramelow	Carsten Schneider	36.8%	17,778	46,612	28,587	64,390	10,299	13,900	5,458	3,350	174,867
193	Gera – Greiz – Altenburger Land	Stephan Brandner	Stephan Brandner	44.8%	42,755	77,161	34,406	20,441	10,915	18,698	3,323	3,918	172,278
194	Saalfeld-Rudolstadt – Saale-Holzland-Kreis – Saale-Orla-Kreis	Michael Kaufmann	Michael Kaufmann	44.5%	40,980	76,204	35,224	21,114	12,415	14,261	4,340	3,835	171,334
195	Suhl – Schmalkalden-Meiningen – Hildburghausen – Sonneberg	Robert Teske	Frank Ullrich	42.1%	39,668	73,608	33,940	18,445	14,697	18,315	2,829	4,205	174,860

=== Rhineland-Palatinate ===
Party	Constituency			Party list			Total seats	+/–
Party	Votes	%	Seats	Votes	%	Seats	Total seats	+/–
Christian Democratic Union (CDU)	831,611	33.6	11 (Note: CDU won 14 constituency seats in Rhineland-Palatinate, but lost 3 seats due to insufficient Second vote coverage.)	760,623	30.6	0	11	▲2
Alternative for Germany (AfD)	476,014	19.2	0	498,695	20.1	7	7	▲3
Social Democratic Party (SPD)	573,461	23.2	1	462,705	18.6	6	7	▼5
Alliance 90/The Greens (GRÜNE)	204,080	8.3	0	256,869	10.3	4	4	▼1
The Left (DIE LINKE)	123,638	5.0	0	161,867	6.5	2	2	▲1
Free Democratic Party (FDP)	83,327	3.4	0	114,047	4.6	0	0	▼5
Sahra Wagenknecht Alliance (BSW)	54,639	2.2	0	105,103	4.2	0	0	New
Free Voters	80,572	3.3	0	52,013	2.1	0	0	Steady
Human Environment Animal Protection Party	11,109	0.4	0	31,542	1.3	0	0	Steady
Volt Germany	26,409	1.1	0	18,846	0.8	0	0	Steady
Die PARTEI	1,440	0.1	0	11,454	0.5	0	0	Steady
Ecological Democratic Party	3,611	0.1	0	4,139	0.2	0	0	Steady
Bündnis Deutschland	2,538	0.1	0	3,884	0.2	0	0	New
Marxist–Leninist Party				571	0.0	0	0	Steady
Independents & voter groups	602	0.0	0				0	–
Invalid/blank votes	27,497	–	–	18,190	–	–	–	–
Total	2,500,548	100	12 (Note: Rhineland-Palatinate has 15 constituencies, but 3 remained unallocated.)	2,500,548	100	19	31	−5
Registered voters/turnout	3,014,482	83.0	–	3,014,482	83.0	–	–	–
Source: Federal Returning Officer

==== Elected members ====
#	CDU	AfD	SPD	Grüne	Linke
Votes	760,623	498,695	462,705	256,869	161,867
%	30.6%	20.1%	18.6%	10.3%	6.5%
Seats	11	7	7	4	2
Constituency seats	Patrick Schnieder (C, 40.2%) [02]; Mechthild Heil (C, 39.3%) [04]; Dr. Thomas Gebhart (C, 38.2%) [03]; Dr. Marlon Bröhr (C, 38.2%) [09]; Harald Orthey (C, 35.7%) [15]; Josef Oster (C, 35.7%) [08]; Ellen Demuth (C, 35.6%) [10]; Jan Metzler (C, 35.3%) [05]; Johannes Steiniger (C, 34.7%) [06]; Florian Bilic (C, 33.3%) [11]; Julia Klöckner (C, 32.3%) [01]		Matthias Mieves (C, 28.0%) [2]		
List seats		1. Sebastian Münzenmaier; 2. Nicole Höchst; 3. Andreas Bleck; 4. Bernd Schattner; 5. Thomas Stephan; 6. Iris Nieland; 7. Jörg Zirwes	1. Dr. Tanja Machalet; 3. Verena Hubertz; 4. Daniel Baldy; 5. Isabel Mackensen-Geis; 6. Dr. Thorsten Rudolph; 7. Angelika Glöckner	1. Misbah Khan; 2. Dr. Armin Grau; 3. Corinna Rüffer; 4. Julian-Béla Joswig	1. Gerhard Trabert; 2. Julia-Christina Stange
Not elected candidates	12. Dominik Sienkiewicz (C, 30.8%); 7. Ursula Groden-Kranich (C, 27.3%); 13. Sertac Bilgin (C, 27.1%); 14. Frank Burgdörfer; 16. Christopher Ralf Hauß; 17. Dr. Kristina Brixius; 18. Ulrike Gerster; 19. Peter Ropertz; 20. Sylvia Holzhäuser; 21. Amal Fischer; 22. Ines Daniels; 23. Nicole Marie Wagner; 24. Justus Brühl; 25. Marion Hartmann; 26. Stephanie Christine Balthasar-Schäfer; 27. Kirsten Pehlke; 28. Carolin Hostert-Hack; 29. Karl-Heinz Totz; 30. Ursula Elisabeth Düll; 31. Caroline Carmen Sabine Hannelore Brömmelhues; 32. Lena Johler	8. Dr. Martin Joachim Dames; 9. Patric Berges; 10. Jens Holger Ott; 11. Clara Alexander; 12. Marco Staudt	8. Christian Schreider; 9. Lena Werner; 10. Umut Kurt; 11. Yildiz Härtel; 12. Markus Trapp; 13. Dr. Joe Weingarten; 14. Dr. Ferdi Akaltin; 15. Jan Hellinghausen; 16. Carolin Oldenstein; 17. Alexander Becker; 18. Alina Löffel-Staßen; 19. Heiko Scheib; 20. Pauline Charlotte Sauerwein; 21. David Rosenberg; 22. Theresa Göbel; 23. Leon Schmitz; 24. Patricia Seelig; 25. Christoph Gerber; 26. Laura Slezak; 27. Dr. Tim Kucharzewski; 28. Aline Seidenspinner; 29. Tobias Paetz; 30. Alexander Kardos; 31. Stefan Oliver Huber-Aydemir; 32. Robin Dautermann	5. Lea Babette Siegfried; 6. Thorsten Becherer; 7. Kim Theisen; 8. Hannah Heller; 9. Sara Pasuki; 10. Obada Barmou; 11. Verena Örenbas; 12. Thorben Thieme; 13. Katja Daish; 14. Yannik Maaß; 15. Regine Kircher-Zumbrink; 16. Lukas Böhm	3. Lin Lindner; 4. Jens Schwaab; 5. Ellen Ruth Oelkers; 6. David Christopher Koch; 7. Lena Olivia Caoimhe Karch; 8. Jonas Leibig; 9. Marion Maria Morassi

Notes
(C, 0.0%) – constituency winner and vote share percent; [0] – position in the Land list (if available)

==== Constituency votes ====
#	Constituency	Elected member	Previous member	%	Margin	Union	AfD	SPD	Grüne	Linke	FDP	BSW	Total
196	Neuwied	Ellen Demuth	Erwin Rüddel	35.6%	26,187	68,501	40,365	42,314	11,921	9,689	6,858	6,445	192,393
197	Ahrweiler	Mechthild Heil	Mechthild Heil	39.3%	31,474	62,011	28,335	30,537	14,413	8,220	5,283	–	157,949
198	Koblenz	Josef Oster	Josef Oster	35.7%	17,438	55,097	24,836	37,659	15,001	9,028	4,703	–	154,292
199	Mosel/Rhein-Hunsrück	Dr. Marlon Bröhr	Marlon Bröhr	38.2%	26,426	53,505	27,060	27,079	10,039	6,494	7,588	–	140,185
200	Kreuznach	Julia Klöckner	Joe Weingarten	32.3%	8,686	46,768	30,688	38,082	7,765	6,352	4,714	4,722	144,936
201	Bitburg	Patrick Schnieder	Patrick Schnieder	40.2%	26,361	53,459	22,265	27,098	7,362	4,893	4,155	–	132,975
202	Trier	None	Verena Hubertz	30.8%	875	47,826	22,088	46,951	12,843	7,791	6,148	5,351	155,299
203	Montabaur	Harald Orthey	Tanja Machalet	35.7%	21,280	61,574	35,321	40,294	10,832	8,709	5,462	–	172,324
204	Mainz	None	Daniel Baldy	27.3%	7,555	57,966	21,665	50,411	40,617	19,474	8,024	4,963	212,692
205	Worms	Jan Metzler	Jan Metzler	35.3%	23,248	62,290	35,866	39,042	13,996	8,638	5,171	4,401	176,255
206	Ludwigshafen/Frankenthal	None	Christian Schreider	27.1%	1,414	43,627	37,117	42,213	12,367	7,794	5,737	5,445	161,031
207	Neustadt – Speyer	Johannes Steiniger	Johannes Steiniger	34.7%	23,021	62,590	35,237	39,569	16,914	7,122	5,582	5,496	180,422
208	Kaiserslautern	Matthias Mieves	Matthias Mieves	28.0%	4,304	42,591	45,160	49,464	10,099	7,396	5,138	7,628	176,885
209	Pirmasens	Florian Bilic	Angelika Glöckner	33.3%	11,258	45,682	34,424	28,474	6,112	4,924	4,078	4,827	137,227
210	Südpfalz	Dr. Thomas Gebhart	Thomas Hitschler	38.2%	32,537	68,124	35,587	34,274	13,799	7,114	4,686	5,361	178,186

=== Bavaria ===
Party	Constituency			Party list			Total seats	+/–
Party	Votes	%	Seats	Votes	%	Seats	Total seats	+/–
Christian Social Union (CSU)	3,272,064	41.2	44 (Note: CSU won all 47 constituency seats in Bavaria, but lost 3 seats due to insufficient Second vote coverage.)	2,964,028	37.2	0	44	▼1
Alternative for Germany (AfD)	1,384,631	17.4	0	1,515,731	19.0	22	22	▲10
Alliance 90/The Greens (GRÜNE)	969,735	12.2	0	957,435	12.0	14	14	▼5
Social Democratic Party (SPD)	1,016,841	12.8	0	920,675	11.5	14	14	▼9
The Left (DIE LINKE)	366,149	4.6	0	456,935	5.7	7	7	▲3
Free Voters	461,198	5.8	0	345,840	4.3	0	0	Steady
Free Democratic Party (FDP)	246,700	3.1	0	333,257	4.2	0	0	▼14
Sahra Wagenknecht Alliance (BSW)	19,929	0.3	0	246,518	3.1	0	0	New
Human Environment Animal Protection Party	28,481	0.4	0	61,869	0.8	0	0	Steady
Volt Germany	66,017	0.8	0	50,671	0.6	0	0	Steady
Ecological Democratic Party	49,197	0.6	0	33,367	0.4	0	0	Steady
Die PARTEI	9,955	0.1	0	30,552	0.4	0	0	Steady
Grassroots Democratic Party of Germany	20,515	0.3	0	28,843	0.4	0	0	Steady
Bavaria Party	5,763	0.1	0	12,278	0.2	0	0	Steady
Bündnis Deutschland	13,923	0.2	0	6,937	0.1	0	0	New
Party of Humanists	613	0.0	0	5,466	0.1	0	0	Steady
Marxist–Leninist Party	890	0.0	0	1,652	0.0	0	0	Steady
Independents & voter groups	16,599	0.2	0				0	–
Invalid/blank votes	47,357	–	–	24,503	–	–	–	–
Total	7,996,557	100	44 (Note: Bavaria has 47 constituencies, but 3 remained unallocated.)	7,996,557	100	57	101	−16
Registered voters/turnout	9,481,659	84.3	–	9,481,659	84.3	–	–	–
Source: Federal Returning Officer

==== Elected members ====
#	CSU	AfD	SPD	Grüne	Linke
Votes	2,964,028	1,515,731	920,675	957,435	456,935
%	37.2%	19.0%	11.5%	12.0%	5.7%
Seats	44	22	14	14	7
Constituency seats	Dorothee Bär (C, 50.5%) [06]; Emmi Zeulner (C, 49.3%) [08]; Reinhard Brandl (C, 47.1%); Siegfried Walch (C, 46.9%); Alexander Radwan (C, 46.4%); Alois Rainer (C, 46.3%) [05]; Dr. Andreas Lenz (C, 45.9%); Alexander Dobrindt (C, 45.8%) [01]; Stephan Stracke (C, 45.5%); Alexander Hoffmann (C, 45.5%); Ulrich Lange (C, 45.1%); Susanne Hierl (C, 44.5%) [22]; Hansjörg Durz (C, 44.5%); Dr. Silke Launert (C, 44.5%) [20]; Stephan Mayer (C, 43.9%); Andrea Lindholz (C, 43.8%) [02]; Dr. Florian Dorn (C, 43.8%); Albert Rupprecht (C, 43.5%) [25]; Dr. Anja Weisgerber (C, 43.4%) [12]; Thomas Erndl (C, 43.3%); Christian Moser (C, 43.1%) [33]; Florian Hahn (C, 43.1%) [07]; Michael Kießling (C, 42.9%); Ralph Edelhäußer (C, 42.9%); Katrin Staffler (C, 42.6%) [16]; Alexander Engelhard (C, 42.5%); Martina Englhardt-Kopf (C, 42.2%) [10]; Dr. Jonas Geissler (C, 41.9%); Artur Auernhammer (C, 41.8%); Daniela Ludwig (C, 40.9%) [04]; Johann Koller (C, 40.8%) [35]; Heiko Hain (C, 40.4%) [31]; Thomas Silberhorn (C, 39.4%); Dr. Hülya Düber (C, 39.1%) [26]; Peter Aumer (C, 38.3%); Tobias Winkler (C, 37.4%); Mechthilde Wittmann (C, 36.8%) [14]; Dr. Wolfgang Stefinger (C, 36.3%); Michael Frieser (C, 36.0%) [13]; Dr. Konrad Körner (C, 35.9%) [21]; Günter Baumgartner (C, 34.9%) [17]; Dr. Stephan Pilsinger (C, 34.7%) [09]; Florian Oßner (C, 34.2%); Dr. Hans Theiss (C, 32.2%) [19]				
List seats		1. Stephan Protschka; 2. Peter Boehringer; 3. Dr. Rainer Rothfuß; 4. Gerrit Huy; 5. Wolfgang Wiehle; 6. Manfred Schiller; 7. Tobias Peterka; 8. Gerold Otten; 9. Peter Felser; 10. Carina Schießl; 11. Tobias Teich; 12. Andreas Mayer; 13. Lukas Rehm; 14. Raimond Scheirich; 15. Bernd Schuhmann; 16. Dr. Ingo Hahn; 17. Dr. Christoph Birghan; 18. Bastian Treuheit; 19. Reinhard Mixl; 20. Rainer Groß; 21. Dr. Rainer Kraft; 22. Erhard Brucker	1. Carsten Träger; 2. Dr. Bärbel Kofler; 3. Johannes Schätzl; 4. Anette Kramme; 5. Sebastian Roloff; 6. Sabine Dittmar; 7. Christoph Schmid; 8. Dr. Carolin Wagner; 9. Bernd Rützel; 10. Gabriela Heinrich; 11. Michael Schrodi; 12. Carmen Wegge; 13. Andreas Schwarz; 14. Heike Heubach	1. Jamila Schäfer; 2. Dr. Anton Hofreiter; 3. Claudia Roth; 4. Sascha Müller; 5. Lisa Badum; 6. Karl Bär; 7. Tina Winklmann; 8. Niklas Wagener; 9. Marlene Schönberger; 10. Leon Eckert; 11. Rebecca Lenhard; 12. Johannes Wagner; 13. Victoria Broßart; 14. Stefan Schmidt	1. Ates Gürpinar; 2. Nicole Gohlke; 3. Sarah Vollath; 4. Luke Hoß; 5. Evelyn Schötz; 6. Aaron Valent; 7. Agnes Conrad
Not elected candidates	15. Dr. Volker Ullrich (C, 31.1%); 18. Claudia Küng (C, 30.4%); 11. Sebastian Brehm (C, 30.2%); 3. Günther Felßner; 23. Josef Rohrmoser; 24. Dr. Julia Kössinger; 27. Dr. Bernd-Berndard Fabritius; 28. Irmgard Sofie Zintl; 29. Reiner Meier; 30. Sophie Sontag-Lohmayer; 32. Prof. Dr. Franziska Wespel; 34. Anna-Maria Auerhahn; 36. Martina Freifrau von Waldenfels; 37. Claus Hochrein; 38. Sabrina Edmeier; 39. Aron Schuster; 40. Nikola Yvonne Astrid Renner; 41. Joseph Manfred Mörtl; 42. Dr. Katharina Maria Ziegler; 43. Valentin Rupert Walk; 44. Lara Polster; 45. Niklas Martin Pabo Neumeyer; 46. Kathrin Fischer; 47. Michael Süß; 48. Bianca Hoffmann-Baumstark; 49. Constantin Rudrof; 50. Sophia Kaiser; 51. Yannick Maurice van Laak; 52. Monika Kohlmüller; 53. Daniel Rupert Uhl; 54. Tanja Rieß; 55. Dr. Fabian Giersdorf; 56. Simone Wenning; 57. Stephan Thomas; 58. Julia Lang; 59. Valentin Alfred Rudolf Huber; 60. Susanne Herding; 61. Robin Reusch; 62. Regina Schrembs; 63. Christian Rose; 64. Birgit Barth; 65. Frederik Barth; 66. Sarah Haneberg; 67. Julien Pursch; 68. Gabriele Jessica Jakob; 69. Christian Hugo Lehrmann; 70. Heike Karin Haspel; 71. Johannes Michael Asenbauer; 72. Elisabeth Rickl; 73. Siddharth Mudgal; 74. Corinna Sarah Christina Seiferlein; 75. Fabian Artur Ernst Schmidbauer; 76. Anja Burkhardt; 77. Ben Brunkhorst; 78. Juliana von Brühl-Störlein; 79. Jonas Markus Müller; 80. Silvia Bergmann; 81. Michael Georg Helgert; 82. Florian Roland Kaida; 83. David Stiegeler; 84. Johannes Alfery; 85. Maximilian Götz; 86. Prof. Dr. Dr. Alexander Ehlers; 87. Gottfried Hänsel; 88. Jan Kämmerer; 89. Philipp Karl Dimit'r Stöckert; 90. Jakob Stocker-Böck; 91. Florian Alexander Fleig; 92. Rolf Picker	23. Wolfgang Bernd Dröse; 24. Michael Theodor Gebhardt; 25. Michael Weiß; 26. Yannic Elias Liebl; 27. Jurij Christopher Kofner; 28. Sebastian Johannes Görtler	15. David Mandrella; 16. Anja König; 17. Andreas Maximilian Mehltretter; 18. Seija Anne Knorr-Köning; 19. Jörg Mathias Nürnberger; 20. Ulrike Bahr; 21. Markus Klaus Hümpfer; 22. Rita Andrea Hagl-Kehl; 23. Jan Heinz Stefan Plobner; 24. Marianne Schieder; 25. Dr. Korbinian Nicholas Rüger; 26. Martina Stamm-Fibich; 27. Severin Johannes Antonin Eder; 28. Katharina Räth; 29. Jonas Bastian Eckstein; 30. Dr. Regina Michaela Renner; 31. Gregor Johannes Forster; 32. Nadine Praun; 33. Thomas Grämmer; 34. Reka Molnar; 35. Ali-Cemil Sat; 36. Philippa Sigl-Glöckner; 37. Manuel Stefan Michniok; 38. Sarah Carmen Lehner; 39. Daniel Mirlach; 40. Marvin Kliem; 41. Marcel Keller; 42. Jürgen Fernengel; 43. David Christian Rausch; 44. Andreas Büch; 45. Dr. Marco Mohr; 46. Konstantin Plappert; 47. Clemens Andreas Johannes Meikis; 48. Raffael Joos; 49. Stefan Werner	15. Jessica Berta Hecht; 16. Dr. Bianca Pircher; 17. Andrea Wörle; 18. Petra Verena Machnik; 19. Britta Jacob; 20. Andre Phillipp Hermann; 21. Maria Ingrid Wißmiller; 22. Maria Krieger; 23. Ulrike Barbara Schweiger; 24. Alpay Artun; 25. Feride Niedermeier; 26. Sebastian Hermann Amler; 27. Anneliese Droste; 28. Kamran Michael Salimi; 29. Inken Bößert; 30. Peter Weis; 31. Sophia Lydia Göppel-Kraft; 32. Christoph Johannes Lochmüller; 33. Julia Fatima Probst; 34. William Sebastian Damm; 35. Miriam Mechthild Anton-Kupfer; 36. Thomas Josef Ochs; 37. Dr. Helene Sigloch; 38. Helmut Horst-Werner Schmidt; 39. Lisa Marie Schießer; 40. Paulus Maximilian Guter; 41. Albina Thaqi; 42. Merlin Georg Friedrich Nagel; 43. Patrizia Anna Siontas; 44. Christian Andreas Ruser; 45. Vivian-Catherine Claus; 46. Peter Biela; 47. Monika Chantal Margarita Hartl; 48. Peter Gerhard Gürtler; 49. Stefanie Rohdenburg; 50. Adrian Lund; 51. Lisa Feldmann; 52. Frederic-Alexej Müller; 53. Sarah Onken; 54. Christian Athanasius König; 55. Christina Mader; 56. Stefan Rudolf Leo Weidinger; 57. Claudia Nicole Weigert; 58. Dr. Harald Jürgen Schmalfuß; 59. Nina Desire Stelzl; 60. Joachim Linse; 61. Miriam Sophia Zoë Bergmann; 62. Frederik Ferid Ostermeier	8. Lukas Jakob Eitel; 9. Jennifer Merx; 10. Janson Damasceno da Costa e Silva; 11. Hanna Wanke; 12. Sebastian Thomas Wanner; 13. Elisabeth Pauline Santoschama Wiesholler; 14. Johannes Jürgen Spielbauer; 15. Mascha Buchwald; 16. Vincent Le Claire; 17. Nadja Gschwendtner; 18. Bernhard Feilzer; 19. Julia Weisenberger; 20. Rudolf Kreuzeder

Notes
(C, 0.0%) – constituency winner and vote share percent; [0] – position in the Land list (if available)

==== Constituency votes ====
#	Constituency	Elected member	Previous member	%	Margin	Union	AfD	Grüne	SPD	Linke	FW	FDP	Total
211	Altötting	Stephan Mayer	Stephan Mayer	43.9%	27,895	60,164	32,269	10,399	11,870	5,867	8,637	3,944	136,967
212	Erding – Ebersberg	Andreas Lenz	Andreas Lenz	45.9%	52,812	80,087	27,275	23,383	17,609	6,856	7,059	6,324	174,443
213	Freising	Christian Moser	Erich Irlstorfer	43.1%	51,060	88,025	36,965	25,718	23,356	8,630	13,208	5,803	204,067
214	Fürstenfeldbruck	Katrin Staffler	Katrin Staffler	42.6%	54,856	84,651	27,997	23,886	29,795	7,313	8,829	8,748	198,599
215	Ingolstadt	Reinhard Brandl	Reinhard Brandl	47.1%	52,619	91,839	39,220	14,531	21,556	7,731	9,909	3,711	195,087
216	Munich North	Hans Diogenes Theiss	Bernhard Loos	32.4%	15,167	59,875	16,684	44,708	36,495	12,123	2,700	8,536	184,655
217	Munich East	Wolfgang Stefinger	Wolfgang Stefinger	36.3%	24,585	74,027	18,451	49,442	31,546	12,477	3,649	8,278	204,003
218	Munich South	None	Jamila Schäfer	30.4%	1,084	54,859	15,876	53,775	26,461	9,825	2,364	7,171	180,632
219	Munich West/Centre	Stephan Pilsinger	Stephan Pilsinger	34.7%	11,957	72,200	–	60,243	33,018	12,683	6,366	10,329	208,136
220	Munich Land	Florian Hahn	Florian Hahn	43.1%	48,159	88,204	22,924	40,045	27,306	8,428	6,071	8,786	204,769
221	Rosenheim	Daniela Ludwig	Daniela Ludwig	40.9%	45,210	82,023	36,813	25,196	17,916	9,152	16,037	5,724	200,689
222	Bad Tölz-Wolfratshausen – Miesbach	Alexander Radwan	Alexander Radwan	46.4%	42,190	65,481	23,291	20,820	10,901	4,694	7,226	4,754	141,146
223	Starnberg – Landsberg am Lech	Michael Kießling	Michael Kießling	42.9%	49,130	80,441	24,187	31,311	24,177	6,449	6,051	6,665	187,546
224	Traunstein	Siegfried Walch	Peter Ramsauer	46.9%	49,513	80,507	30,994	14,985	20,845	6,884	10,690	3,270	171,750
225	Weilheim	Alexander Dobrindt	Alexander Dobrindt	45.8%	43,240	65,409	22,169	18,128	13,489	5,698	7,936	6,356	142,916
226	Deggendorf	Thomas Erndl	Thomas Erndl	43.3%	21,941	58,347	36,406	6,354	12,156	3,070	11,370	5,188	134,810
227	Landshut	Florian Oßner	Florian Oßner	34.2%	28,863	70,986	42,123	17,125	18,800	7,562	38,342	6,437	207,304
228	Passau	Johann Georg Koller	Andreas Scheuer	40.8%	24,762	58,538	33,776	7,425	20,121	4,161	9,198	3,072	143,520
229	Rottal-Inn	Günter Baumgartner	Max Straubinger	34.9%	16,697	49,582	32,885	7,688	9,947	4,167	32,668	2,625	142,070
230	Straubing	Alois Rainer	Alois Rainer	46.3%	28,618	65,291	36,673	7,241	11,132	4,394	11,139	2,715	140,943
231	Amberg	Susanne Hierl	Susanne Hierl	44.5%	42,267	80,626	38,359	12,177	19,705	7,316	12,883	4,698	181,133
232	Regensburg	Peter Aumer	Peter Aumer	38.3%	43,141	81,105	37,964	27,741	27,626	9,736	11,214	5,229	211,967
233	Schwandorf	Martina Englhardt-Kopf	Martina Englhardt-Kopf	42.2%	28,022	77,717	49,695	7,516	25,534	4,914	13,591	3,432	184,150
234	Weiden	Albert Rupprecht	Albert Rupprecht	43.5%	27,916	59,268	31,352	6,624	16,294	5,591	9,673	4,126	136,146
235	Bamberg	Thomas Silberhorn	Thomas Silberhorn	39.4%	32,153	61,044	28,891	20,762	22,569	7,914	6,174	4,709	154,868
236	Bayreuth	Silke Launert	Silke Launert	44.5%	34,222	59,366	25,144	10,999	19,031	6,117	6,741	3,680	133,465
237	Coburg	Jonas Geissler	Jonas Geissler	41.9%	26,903	53,725	26,822	10,943	18,425	5,019	6,944	2,490	128,177
238	Hof	Heiko Hain	Hans-Peter Friedrich	40.4%	21,312	51,926	30,614	6,391	22,966	5,789	6,181	3,160	128,662
239	Kulmbach	Emmi Zeulner	Emmi Zeulner	49.3%	38,748	69,446	30,698	9,233	13,210	5,361	8,742	2,838	140,765
240	Ansbach	Artur Auernhammer	Artur Auernhammer	41.8%	41,623	84,723	43,100	18,248	26,718	9,434	10,960	5,276	202,816
241	Erlangen	Konrad Körner	Stefan Müller	35.9%	28,634	57,971	22,637	29,337	28,003	9,115	7,023	4,761	161,420
242	Fürth	Tobias Winkler	Tobias Winkler	37.4%	39,168	77,512	38,344	22,502	36,983	12,638	8,042	6,095	207,133
243	Nuremberg North	None	Sebastian Brehm	30.2%	12,992	45,424	18,093	32,432	26,738	14,697	2,963	4,976	150,494
244	Nuremberg South	Michael Frieser	Michael Frieser	36.0%	21,785	48,913	27,128	14,730	24,213	10,821	3,662	3,556	135,854
245	Roth	Ralph Edelhäußer	Ralph Edelhäußer	42.9%	50,952	84,151	33,199	24,181	25,561	9,951	8,872	5,525	196,205
246	Aschaffenburg	Andrea Lindholz	Andrea Lindholz	43.8%	39,159	67,597	28,438	18,230	19,006	7,334	4,314	5,169	154,337
247	Bad Kissingen	Dorothee Bär	Dorothee Bär	50.5%	62,230	87,357	–	10,615	25,127	9,957	22,323	8,444	172,919
248	Main-Spessart	Alexander Hoffmann	Alexander Hoffmann	45.5%	45,144	74,896	29,752	13,740	25,806	6,784	8,328	3,802	164,539
249	Schweinfurt	Anja Weisgerber	Anja Weisgerber	43.4%	36,623	70,455	33,832	12,894	21,834	7,606	7,823	3,992	162,497
250	Würzburg	Hülya Düber	Paul Lehrieder	39.1%	38,330	74,917	24,817	36,587	26,349	9,766	5,704	8,012	191,416
251	Augsburg-Stadt	None	Volker Ullrich	31.1%	15,422	45,742	25,488	30,320	20,701	10,966	5,463	4,139	147,299
252	Augsburg-Land	Hansjörg Durz	Hansjörg Durz	44.5%	50,825	88,388	37,563	18,278	25,217	7,842	10,256	5,509	198,616
253	Donau-Ries	Ulrich Lange	Ulrich Lange	45.1%	38,380	73,296	34,916	9,398	19,720	5,536	9,972	3,895	162,644
254	Neu-Ulm	Alexander Engelhard	Alexander Engelhard	42.5%	33,360	75,359	41,999	14,869	18,762	8,006	6,162	5,121	177,392
255	Memmingen – Unterallgäu	Florian Dorn	New	43.8%	28,108	58,479	30,371	10,821	12,674	6,212	11,106	3,938	133,601
256	Oberallgäu	Mechthilde Wittmann	Mechthilde Wittmann	36.8%	38,422	70,226	31,804	23,668	16,065	7,461	16,475	8,113	190,708
257	Ostallgäu	Stephan Stracke	Stephan Stracke	45.5%	35,266	61,899	26,633	14,096	13,508	6,102	10,158	3,529	135,925

=== Baden-Württemberg ===
Party	Constituency			Party list			Total seats	+/–
Party	Votes	%	Seats	Votes	%	Seats	Total seats	+/–
Christian Democratic Union (CDU)	2,280,707	36.0	29 (Note: CDU won 35 constituency seats in Baden-Württemberg, but lost 6 seats due to insufficient Second vote coverage.)	2,006,866	31.6	0	29	▼4
Alternative for Germany (AfD)	1,231,221	19.4	0	1,256,430	19.8	19	19	▲9
Social Democratic Party (SPD)	1,002,327	15.8	0	898,778	14.2	13	13	▼9
Alliance 90/The Greens (GRÜNE)	887,608	14.0	3	865,738	13.6	9	12	▼6
The Left (DIE LINKE)	360,037	5.7	0	429,484	6.8	6	6	▲3
Free Democratic Party (FDP)	271,794	4.3	0	357,539	5.6	0	0	▼16
Sahra Wagenknecht Alliance (BSW)				260,219	4.1	0	0	New
Free Voters	163,869	2.6	0	86,311	1.4	0	0	Steady
Human Environment Animal Protection Party	10,548	0.2	0	55,906	0.9	0	0	Steady
Volt Germany	69,168	1.1	0	49,025	0.8	0	0	Steady
Die PARTEI	20,293	0.3	0	28,041	0.4	0	0	Steady
Grassroots Democratic Party of Germany	17,282	0.3	0	21,845	0.3	0	0	Steady
Ecological Democratic Party	1,798	0.0	0	12,258	0.2	0	0	Steady
Alliance C – Christians for Germany	2,021	0.0	0	11,768	0.2	0	0	Steady
Bündnis Deutschland	4,821	0.1	0	7,411	0.1	0	0	New
Marxist–Leninist Party	3,574	0.1	0	2,379	0.0	0	0	Steady
Independents & voter groups	5,646	0.1	0				0	–
Invalid/blank votes	49,732	–	–	32,448	–	–	–	–
Total	6,382,446	100	32 (Note: Baden-Württemberg has 38 constituencies, but 6 remained unallocated.)	6,382,446	100	47	79	−23
Registered voters/turnout	7,653,811	83.4	–	7,653,811	83.4	–	–	–
Source: Federal Returning Officer

==== Elected members ====
#	CDU	AfD	SPD	Grüne	Linke
Votes	2,006,866	1,256,430	898,778	865,738	429,484
%	31.6%	19.8%	14.2%	13.6%	6.8%
Seats	29	19	13	12	6
Constituency seats	Nina Warken (C, 42.8%) [02]; Thorsten Frei (C, 42.3%) [01]; Roderich Kiesewetter (C, 41.4%); Wolfgang Dahler (C, 40.9%); Volker Mayer-Lay (C, 40.0%); Fabian Gramling (C, 39.3%); Nicolas Zippelius (C, 39.2%); Klaus Mack (C, 39.0%); Dr. Maria-Lena Weiss (C, 38.9%); Kai Whittaker (C, 38.9%); Ronja Kemmer (C, 38.8%) [04]; Axel Müller (C, 38.7%); Michael Donth (C, 38.5%); Johannes Rothenberger (C, 38.2%); Dr. Matthias Hiller (C, 37.7%); Felix Schreiner (C, 37.7%); Andreas Jung (C, 37.7%) [03]; Christina Stumpp (C, 37.7%) [05]; Marc Biadacz (C, 37.3%); Thomas Bareiß (C, 37.1%); Hermann Färber (C, 37.1%) [14]; Gunther Krichbaum (C, 37.1%); Dr. Yannick Bury (C, 37.0%); Dr. David Preisendanz (C, 37.0%); Dr. Ingeborg Gräßle (C, 36.6%); Steffen Bilger (C, 36.5%); Christian von Ehrenfels (C, 36.4%); Olav Gutting (C, 36.1%); Alexander Throm (C, 35.0%)			Chantal Kopf (C, 32.5%) [9]; Dr. Zoe Mayer (C, 30.6%) [7]; Simone Fischer (C, 28.3%) [15]	
List seats		1. Dr. Alice Weidel; 2. Markus-Cornel Frohnmaier; 3. Martin Hess; 4. Marc Bernhard; 5. Ruben Rupp; 6. Hans-Jürgen Goßner; 7. Jürgen Kögel; 8. Diana Zimmer; 9. Achim Köhler; 10. Lars Haise; 11. Alexander Arpaschi; 12. Dr. Malte Kaufmann; 13. Joachim Bloch; 14. Dr. Michael Blos; 15. Heinrich Koch; 16. Johann Martel; 17. Martina Kempf; 18. Sieghard Knodel; 19. Dr. Paul Schmidt	1. Saskia Esken; 2. Dr. Nils Schmid; 3. Rita Schwarzelühr-Sutter; 4. Martin Gerster; 5. Katja Mast; 6. Dr. Johannes Fechner; 7. Jasmina Hostert; 8. Parsa Marvi; 9. Isabel Cademartori Dujisin; 10. Macit Karaahmetoğlu; 11. Derya Türk-Nachbaur; 12. Dr. Lars Castellucci; 13. Dr. Lina Seitzl	1. Dr. Franziska Brantner; 2. Ricarda Lang; 3. Agnes Brugger; 4. Dr. Sebastian Schäfer; 5. Dr. Sandra Detzer; 6. Marcel Emmerich; 8. Harald Ebner; 10. Matthias Gastel; 11. Dr. Anja Reinalter	1. Sahra Mirow; 2. Luigi Pantisano; 3. Gökay Akbulut; 4. Vinzenz Glaser; 5. Anne Zerr; 6. Marcel Bauer
Not elected candidates	Moritz Oppelt (C, 34.4%); Stefan Glaser (C, 33.2%); Christoph Naser (C, 31.7%); 9. Maximilian Mörseburg (C, 30.4%); 6. Alexander Föhr (C, 29.2%); 7. Melis Sekmen (C, 24.7%); 8. Elisabeth Schick-Ebert; 10. Lilly Hummel; 11. Dr. Klaus Thomas Schüle; 12. Dr. Sarah Schmid-Nürnberg; 13. Christian Josef Natterer; 15. Margaret Horb; 16. Carmen Alexandra Jäger; 17. Marie-Sophie Hedwig Lanig; 18. Silke Deborah Kurz; 19. Ellen Joanna Freudenmann-Habel; 20. Robert Märsch; 21. Vera Gerlinde Huber; 22. Pauline Borchard; 23. Karin Doris Möhle; 24. Gordian Felix Schwarz; 25. Leon Paul Kolb; 26. Felix Wilhelm Ockenfuß; 27. Denise Marie Hradecky; 28. Heinrich Hermann Volker Noseck; 29. Julia Brigitte Mayer; 30. Rainer Martin Staib; 31. Dominik Markus Apel; 32. Lars Henrik Sakal; 33. Jessica Elisa Csikova; 34. Nico Ruß; 35. Christian Kastner; 36. Silke Stephanie Rombach; 37. Hero Katharina Merkel; 38. Anette Waltraud Groschupp; 39. Valérie Estelle Mänder; 40. Heidi Liebert; 41. Felix Alexander Wiesner; 42. Patrick Chris Julian Speiser; 43. Ann-Kathrin Flik; 44. Felix Lehmann; 45. Daniel Funke; 46. Patricia Schmid; 47. Hans Dieter Pfohl; 48. Athanassia Vassiliadis; 49. Klaus Josef Hoffmann; 50. Alexandra Zink-Colacicco; 51. Yannik Thomas Senn; 52. Hanns Christoph Zalder; 53. Stephanie Schmidt-Weiss; 54. Lisa Domat; 55. Tizian Paul Mattes; 56. Hasan Basri Avci; 57. Gerhard Bernhard Lutz; 58. Lance Jordan Neidig; 59. Elvira Corinna Große	20. Sandro Scheer; 21. Benjamin Pascal Götz; 22. Dieter Kurt August Glatting; 23. Christine Schäfer; 24. Christian Andreas Horst Köhler; 25. Sebastian van Ryt	14. Leon Maria Michael Hahn; 15. Anna Lucia Schanbacher; 16. Kevin Leiser; 17. Heike Engelhardt; 18. Robin Mesarosch; 19. Franziska Blessing; 20. Lukas Johannes Hornung; 21. Nezaket Yildirim; 22. Jens Schäfer; 23. Argyri Paraschaki-Schauer; 24. Dr. Ludwig Striet; 25. Cornelia Almuth True; 26. Florian Christoph Zarnetta; 27. Mirko Wilko Witkowski; 28. Assad Hussain; 29. Tim-Luka Schwab; 30. Sebastian Weigle; 31. Philipp Hensinger; 32. Dr. Tim Manfred Tugendhat; 33. Sebastian Gillmeister; 34. Dirk Flacke; 35. Urs Jakob Abelein; 36. Mario Sickinger; 37. Dietmar Richard Bulat	12. Jan-Lukas Schmitt; 13. Dr. Anna Christmann; 14. Tomias Bacherle; 16. Jasmin Ateia; 17. Jaron Immer; 18. Dr. Ann-Margret Amui-Vedel; 19. Jürgen Kretz; 20. Nina Uschi Elke Wellenreuther; 21. Marin Juric; 22. Sarah Heim; 23. Sebastian Andrè Grässer; 24. Susanne Floß; 25. Dr. Andreas Ragoschke-Schumm; 26. Gülay Asli Kücük; 27. Lars Maximilian Schweizer; 28. Dr. Jeannette Monika Behringer; 29. Moritz Casimir Franz-Gerstein; 30. Rosa Valerie Buß; 31. Ahmad Al Hamidi; 32. Elisabeth Schilli; 33. Jonathan Ebert; 34. Clara Madeleine Wellhäußer; 35. Dr. Frank Konrad Brede; 36. Thea Thuy Nga Trinh; 37. Dr. Thomas Rink	7. Amelie Anouk Vollmer; 8. Ralf Wolfgang Jaster; 9. Avra Emin; 10. Jürgen Christoph Creutzmann; 11. Nadja Schmidt; 12. Justus Heine; 13. Clara Johanna Ruth Françoise Meier; 14. Thomas Hanser; 15. Nina Victoria Eisenmann; 16. Maximilian Krippner; 17. Ellena Nilima Schumacher-Koelsch; 18. Marcell Menzel; 19. Mara Zeltmann; 20. Martin Helmut Auerbach

Notes
(C, 0.0%) – constituency winner and vote share percent; [0] – position in the Land list (if available)

==== Constituency votes ====
#	Constituency	Elected member	Previous member	%	Margin	Union	AfD	SPD	Grüne	Linke	FDP	Total
258	Stuttgart I	Simone Fischer	Stefan Kaufmann	28.3%	5	45,662	13,843	25,231	45,667	14,203	9,327	161,195
259	Stuttgart II	None	Maximilian Mörseburg	30.4%	12,623	42,061	20,166	22,057	29,438	12,414	5,789	138,503
260	Böblingen	Marc Biadacz	Marc Biadacz	37.3%	41,207	76,033	34,826	34,198	27,409	9,936	12,438	203,582
261	Esslingen	David Preisendanz	Markus Grübel	37.0%	28,883	51,329	21,754	22,446	21,500	9,177	6,021	138,608
262	Nürtingen	Matthias Hiller	Michael Hennrich	37.7%	34,372	64,951	30,579	28,298	24,795	9,264	9,105	172,135
263	Göppingen	Hermann Färber	Hermann Färber	37.1%	20,683	52,947	32,264	24,232	13,239	6,812	5,839	142,684
264	Waiblingen	Christina Stumpp	Christina Stumpp	37.7%	36,057	69,225	33,168	31,595	22,702	9,726	10,519	183,741
265	Ludwigsburg	Steffen Bilger	Steffen Bilger	36.5%	35,150	65,326	30,176	27,111	28,680	11,154	9,149	178,806
266	Neckar-Zaber	Fabian Gramling	Fabian Gramling	39.3%	38,423	76,390	37,967	29,184	22,572	9,925	7,695	194,624
267	Heilbronn	Alexander Throm	Alexander Throm	35.0%	19,156	67,516	48,360	29,914	16,637	11,484	9,852	193,001
268	Schwäbisch Hall – Hohenlohe	Christian von Stetten	Christian von Stetten	36.4%	22,855	67,218	44,363	27,499	18,528	8,902	8,307	184,694
269	Backnang – Schwäbisch Gmünd	Ingeborg Gräßle	Ingeborg Gräßle	36.6%	19,124	53,064	33,940	23,870	15,499	7,486	5,844	145,149
270	Aalen – Heidenheim	Roderich Kiesewetter	Roderich Kiesewetter	41.4%	32,673	74,010	41,337	25,137	14,872	8,987	6,425	178,828
271	Karlsruhe-Stadt	Zoe Mayer	Zoe Mayer	30.6%	11,709	39,597	22,986	25,553	51,306	13,353	6,399	167,430
272	Karlsruhe-Land	Nicolas Zippelius	Nicolas Zippelius	39.2%	36,146	68,439	32,293	26,153	22,739	8,839	7,330	174,777
273	Rastatt	Kai Whittaker	Kai Whittaker	38.9%	27,041	63,116	36,075	24,569	18,274	7,608	5,727	162,457
274	Heidelberg	None	Franziska Brantner	29.2%	2,637	54,060	22,182	29,464	51,423	13,225	6,767	185,384
275	Mannheim	None	Isabel Cademartori	24.7%	3,429	37,566	27,170	34,137	27,493	12,117	6,391	151,921
276	Odenwald – Tauber	Nina Warken	Nina Warken	42.8%	33,725	72,800	39,075	24,015	13,334	7,689	5,336	169,900
277	Rhein-Neckar	None	Moritz Oppelt	34.4%	22,844	55,930	33,086	33,082	17,909	8,276	7,029	162,479
278	Bruchsal – Schwetzingen	Olav Gutting	Olav Gutting	36.1%	22,364	58,113	35,749	26,254	17,251	8,294	6,699	160,799
279	Pforzheim	Gunther Krichbaum	Gunther Krichbaum	37.1%	17,497	63,762	46,265	36,222	–	11,023	9,382	172,032
280	Calw	Klaus Mack	Klaus Mack	39.0%	24,074	63,399	39,325	20,945	13,187	6,312	6,838	162,408
281	Freiburg	Chantal Kopf	Chantal Kopf	32.5%	15,475	47,806	20,008	30,486	63,281	19,518	5,541	194,763
282	Lörrach – Müllheim	None	Diana Stöcker	33.2%	29,052	61,900	32,848	32,290	29,239	11,325	5,810	186,369
283	Emmendingen – Lahr	Yannick Bury	Yannick Bury	37.0%	26,780	66,984	34,282	40,204	18,328	8,504	5,695	180,872
284	Offenburg	Johannes Rothenberger	Wolfgang Schäuble	38.2%	29,081	63,492	34,411	21,575	20,482	8,993	7,406	166,185
285	Rottweil – Tuttlingen	Maria-Lena Weiss	Maria-Lena Weiss	38.9%	18,243	62,245	44,002	17,697	12,461	7,147	8,719	159,828
286	Schwarzwald-Baar	Thorsten Frei	Thorsten Frei	42.3%	25,901	55,044	29,143	19,396	9,979	5,295	4,524	130,078
287	Konstanz	Andreas Jung	Andreas Jung	37.7%	34,335	63,922	29,587	26,451	25,390	9,987	7,363	169,574
288	Waldshut	Felix Schreiner	Felix Schreiner	37.7%	27,757	54,467	26,710	26,958	16,809	6,839	5,169	144,405
289	Reutlingen	Michael Donth	Michael Donth	38.5%	30,710	63,189	32,479	22,440	20,868	9,118	9,115	164,202
290	Tübingen	None	Annette Widmann-Mauz	31.7%	12,076	54,252	25,760	22,149	42,176	10,521	6,242	171,017
291	Ulm	Ronja Kemmer	Ronja Kemmer	38.8%	38,235	73,225	34,990	25,220	29,344	9,375	6,700	188,780
292	Biberach	Wolfgang Dahler	Josef Rief	40.9%	26,574	58,651	32,077	18,225	14,819	5,447	5,555	143,512
293	Bodensee	Volker Mayer-Lay	Volker Mayer-Lay	40.0%	28,340	57,658	29,318	21,966	18,269	6,090	4,628	144,027
294	Ravensburg	Axel Müller	Axel Müller	38.7%	31,543	60,702	29,159	17,209	23,871	9,810	8,948	156,776
295	Zollernalb – Sigmaringen	Thomas Bareiß	Thomas Bareiß	37.1%	16,158	54,656	38,498	28,895	7,838	5,862	6,171	147,189

=== Saarland ===
Party	Constituency			Party list			Total seats	+/–
Party	Votes	%	Seats	Votes	%	Seats	Total seats	+/–
Christian Democratic Union (CDU)	177,003	29.6	2	161,113	26.9	0	2	Steady
Social Democratic Party (SPD)	178,746	29.9	2	131,136	21.9	0	2	▼2
Alternative for Germany (AfD)	129,177	21.6	0	129,294	21.6	2	2	▲1
The Left (DIE LINKE)	41,215	6.9	0	44,080	7.4	1	1	Steady
Alliance 90/The Greens (GRÜNE)	30,477	5.1	0	43,371	7.2	1	1	▲1
Sahra Wagenknecht Alliance (BSW)				37,001	6.2	0	0	New
Free Democratic Party (FDP)	20,611	3.5	0	25,725	4.3	0	0	▼1
Human Environment Animal Protection Party				12,263	2.0	0	0	Steady
Free Voters	19,458	3.3	0	8,476	1.4	0	0	Steady
Volt Germany				3,720	0.6	0	0	Steady
Pirate Party Germany				1,753	0.3	0	0	Steady
Bündnis Deutschland				1,487	0.2	0	0	New
Marxist–Leninist Party	556	0.1	0	304	0.1	0	0	Steady
Invalid/blank votes	8,051	–	–	5,570	–	–	–	–
Total	605,293	100	4	605,293	100	4	8	−1
Registered voters/turnout	734,204	82.4	–	734,204	82.4	–	–	–
Source: Federal Returning Officer

==== Elected members ====
#	CDU	AfD	SPD	Grüne	Linke
Votes	161,113	129,294	131,136	43,371	44,080
%	26.9%	21.6%	21.9%	7.2%	7.4%
Seats	2	2	2	1	1
Constituency seats	Roland Theis (C, 33.9%) [1]; Philip Hoffmann (C, 31.8%) [4]		Josephine Ortleb (C, 32.4%) [2]; Esra-Leon Limbacher (C, 30.5%) [1]		
List seats		1. Carsten Becker; 2. Boris Gamanov		1. Jeanne Marie Dillschneider	1. Dr. Moses Arndt
Not elected candidates	2. Markus Uhl; 3. Yvonne Brück; 5. Saskia Wita; 6. Dana Maria Wernet; 7. Christian Müller; 8. Lisa Kämpf; 9. Christina Haßdenteufel; 10. Jan-Philipp Luxenburger; 11. Carina Münzebrock; 12. Susanne Elisabeth Ingrid Wirth; 13. Nicole Macri; 14. Vivien Rupp; 15. Nikolas Seger; 16. Sophie Holderbaum; 17. Tobias Speicher; 18. Dardan Tërstena; 19. Lena-Marie Adam; 20. Sabrina Margot Math	3. Rüdiger Matthias Klesmann; 4. Olexij Shvydkyi; 5. Werner Heinz Schwaben; 6. Magdalena Kamila Schaufert	3. David Maaß; 4. Sandra Hans; 5. Matthias Rudi Moseler; 6. Tanja Margret Friedrich; 7. Eric Meyer; 8. Nicole Herrmann; 9. Stefan Schmidt; 10. Christine Ney; 11. Hans-Dieter Nikolaus Braun; 12. Viola Marie Pfeiffer	2. Volker Manfred Morbe; 3. Barbara Anna Maria Klein-Braun; 4. Hanko Zachow; 5. Carolin De Marino; 6. Christian Bernhard Endy Albuzat	2. Jasmin Pies; 3. Cornelia Kreuter; 4. Udo Reden-Buschbacher; 5. Anne Maria Dietrich

Notes
(C, 0.0%) – constituency winner and vote share percent; [0] – position in the Land list (if available)

==== Constituency votes ====
#	Constituency	Elected member	Previous member	%	Margin	Union	SPD	AfD	Linke	Grüne	FDP	Total
296	Saarbrücken	Josephine Ortleb	Josephine Ortleb	32.4%	11,258	36,514	47,772	30,422	12,484	10,931	5,305	147,516
297	Saarlouis	Philip Hoffmann	Heiko Maas	31.8%	5,696	51,704	46,008	35,621	10,903	7,726	5,260	162,392
298	St. Wendel	Roland Theis	Christian Petry	33.9%	7,467	47,875	40,408	29,038	8,133	5,342	5,361	141,323
299	Homburg	Esra-Leon Limbacher	Esra-Leon Limbacher	30.5%	3,647	40,910	44,557	34,096	9,695	6,478	4,685	146,011

== Overhang first vote winners ==
The electoral reform of 2023 fixed the number of Bundestag seats at 630 by ending the awarding of overhang mandates. Therefore, winning a first-past-the-post first vote in one of the 299 Bundestag constituencies no longer guarantees a candidate entry into the Bundestag. If a party wins more constituency contests than their party's second vote share entitles them to, their direct mandate winners in the state with the lowest constituency vote shares would not be seated, and the constituency seat would be left vacant.

In the 2025 election, a total of 23 first vote winners in this predicament. In 19 of those constituencies, at least one rival who they defeated in the local contest entered Bundestag via list mandates. The other four constituencies, three of which are in Baden-Württemberg, remain without local representatives in the Bundestag. Of the 23 overhang first vote winners, three were incumbent constituency MdBs and four were incumbent list MdBs.

When a vacancy for their respective parties for their respective states occur, these 23 first-vote winners will be given priority to fill the vacant seats, ahead of their parties' list candidates.

bold indicates an incumbent MdB bold-italics indicates an incumbent MdB representing the constituency prior to the election

#	Constituency	Candidate	Direct vote share	Defeated rivals entering Bundestag via party list		
1	Flensburg – Schleswig (Schleswig-Holstein)	**Petra Nicolaisen** (CDU)	26.5%	Robert Habeck (Greens)	2nd	22.6%
1	Flensburg – Schleswig (Schleswig-Holstein)	**Petra Nicolaisen** (CDU)	26.5%	Stefan Seidler (SSW)	5th	11.2%
1	Flensburg – Schleswig (Schleswig-Holstein)	**Petra Nicolaisen** (CDU)	26.5%	Lorenz Gösta Beutin (Left)	6th	5.4%
14	Rostock – Landkreis Rostock II (Mecklenburg-Vorpommern)	Steffi Burmeister (AfD)	26.8%	Dietmar Bartsch (Left)	2nd	25.6%
54	Bremen I (Bremen)	Ulrike Hiller (SPD)	25.2%	Thomas Röwekamp (CDU)	2nd	24.0%
54	Bremen I (Bremen)	Ulrike Hiller (SPD)	25.2%	Kirsten Kappert-Gonther (Greens)	3rd	18.9%
54	Bremen I (Bremen)	Ulrike Hiller (SPD)	25.2%	Doris Achelwilm (Left)	4th	11.8%
54	Bremen I (Bremen)	Ulrike Hiller (SPD)	25.2%	Sergej Minich (AfD)	5th	11.8%
58	Oberhavel – Havelland II (Brandenburg)	Andreas Galau (AfD)	30.8%	Uwe Feiler (CDU)	2nd	24.8%
71	Halle (Sachsen-Anhalt)	Alexander Raue (AfD)	30.6%	Janina Böttger (Left)	3rd	16.2%
151	Leipzig I (Saxony)	Christian Kriegel (AfD)	25.0%	Jens Lehmann (CDU)	3rd	21.5%
151	Leipzig I (Saxony)	Christian Kriegel (AfD)	25.0%	Holger Mann (SPD)	5th	11.7%
169	Schwalm-Eder (Hesse)	Anna-Maria Bischof (CDU)	30.1%	Philipp Rottwilm (SPD)	3rd	28.3%
181	Frankfurt am Main I (Hesse)	Yannick Schwander	26.0%	Deborah Düring (Greens)	2nd	16.2%
181	Frankfurt am Main I (Hesse)	Yannick Schwander	26.0%	Armand Zorn (SPD)	3rd	25.7%
181	Frankfurt am Main I (Hesse)	Yannick Schwander	26.0%	Janine Wissler (Left)	4th	12.8%
182	Frankfurt am Main II (Hesse)	Leopold Born (CDU)	27.4%	Omid Nouripour (Greens)	2nd	26.4%
183	Groß-Gerau (Hesse)	Marcus Kretschmann (CDU)	30.3%	Jörg Cezanne (Left)	5th	8.9%
185	Darmstadt (Hesse)	**Astrid Mannes** (CDU)	26.7%	**(unrepresented)**		
202	Trier (Rhineland-Palatinate)	Dominik Sienkiewicz (CDU)	30.8%	Verena Hubertz (SPD)	2nd	30.3%
202	Trier (Rhineland-Palatinate)	Dominik Sienkiewicz (CDU)	30.8%	Corinna Rüffer (Greens)	4th	8.3%
204	Mainz (Rhineland-Palatinate)	Ursula Groden-Kranich (CDU)	27.3%	Daniel Baldy (SPD)	3rd	23.7%
204	Mainz (Rhineland-Palatinate)	Ursula Groden-Kranich (CDU)	27.3%	Gerhard Trabert (Left)	4th	9.1%
206	Ludwigshafen/Frankenthal (Rhineland-Palatinate)	Sertac Bilgin (CDU)	27.1%	Armin Grau (Greens)	4th	7.7%
218	Munich South (Bavaria)	Claudia Küng (CSU)	30.4%	Jamila Schäfer (Greens)	2nd	29.8%
218	Munich South (Bavaria)	Claudia Küng (CSU)	30.4%	Sebastian Jörg Roloff (SPD)	3rd	14.6%
218	Munich South (Bavaria)	Claudia Küng (CSU)	30.4%	Wolfgang Wiehle (AfD)	4th	8.8%
243	Nuremberg North (Bavaria)	**Sebastian Brehm** (CSU)	30.2%	Rebecca Lenhard (Greens)	2nd	21.6%
243	Nuremberg North (Bavaria)	**Sebastian Brehm** (CSU)	30.2%	Gabriela Heinrich (SPD)	3rd	17.8%
251	Augsburg-Stadt (Bavaria)	Volker Ullrich (CSU)	31.1%	Claudia Benedikta Roth (Greens)	2nd	20.6%
251	Augsburg-Stadt (Bavaria)	Volker Ullrich (CSU)	31.1%	Raimond Christian Scheirich (AfD)	3rd	17.3%
259	Stuttgart II (Baden-Württemberg)	**Maximilian Mörseburg** (CDU)	30.4%	**(unrepresented)**		
274	Heidelberg (Baden-Württemberg)	**Alexander Föhr** (CDU)	29.2%	Franziska Brantner (Greens)	2nd	27.7%
274	Heidelberg (Baden-Württemberg)	**Alexander Föhr** (CDU)	29.2%	Dr. Malte Kaufmann (AfD)	4th	12.0%
274	Heidelberg (Baden-Württemberg)	**Alexander Föhr** (CDU)	29.2%	Sahra Mirow (Left)	5th	7.1%
275	Mannheim (Baden-Württemberg)	**Melis Sekmen** (CDU)	24.7%	Isabel Cademartori (SPD)	2nd	22.5%
275	Mannheim (Baden-Württemberg)	**Melis Sekmen** (CDU)	24.7%	Heinrich Friedrich Koc (AfD)	4th	17.9%
275	Mannheim (Baden-Württemberg)	**Melis Sekmen** (CDU)	24.7%	Gökay Akbulut (Left)	5th	8.0%
277	Rhein-Neckar (Baden-Württemberg)	**Moritz Oppelt** (CDU)	34.4%	Achim Köhler (AfD)	2nd	20.4%
277	Rhein-Neckar (Baden-Württemberg)	**Moritz Oppelt** (CDU)	34.4%	Dr. Lars Dietmar Castellucci (SPD)	3rd	20.4%
282	Lörrach – Müllheim (Baden-Württemberg)	Stefan Glaser (CDU)	33.2%	**(unrepresented)**		
290	Tübingen (Baden-Württemberg)	Christoph Naser (CDU)	31.7%	**(unrepresented)**		

== Members who lost their seats ==
This is an incomplete list of MdBs who lost their seat from the 20th Bundestag in the 2025 German federal election. Most incumbents sought reelection via both a contingency first vote and a placement on their party's state lists. Those listed were unsuccessful in both attempts.

Outlisted means a list MdB did not win a seat on the state list and also failed to win a direct mandate.

Overhang means the constituency MdB won the vote for a direct mandate but was not seated due to their party's insufficient vote coverage on the state list. The member would have won an overhang mandate prior to the 2023 electoral reform.

Name	Constituency	State	First elected	Party held seat since	Defeated by
=== Sahra Wagenknecht Alliance ===					
Jessica Tatti	List	Baden-Württemberg	2017	n/a	Party's failure to meet 5% threshold
Klaus Ernst	List	Bavaria	2005	n/a	Party's failure to meet 5% threshold
Żaklin Nastić	List	Hamburg	2017	n/a	Party's failure to meet 5% threshold
Ali Al-Dailami	List	Hesse	2021	n/a	Party's failure to meet 5% threshold
Amira Mohamed Ali	List	Lower Saxony	2017	n/a	Party's failure to meet 5% threshold
Sevim Dağdelen	List	North Rhine-Westphalia	2005	n/a	Party's failure to meet 5% threshold
Andrej Hunko	List	North Rhine-Westphalia	2009	n/a	Party's failure to meet 5% threshold
Christian Leye	List	North Rhine-Westphalia	2021	n/a	Party's failure to meet 5% threshold
Sahra Wagenknecht	List	North Rhine-Westphalia	2009	n/a	Party's failure to meet 5% threshold
Alexander Ulrich	List	Rhineland-Palatinate	2005	n/a	Party's failure to meet 5% threshold
=== Christian Democratic Union of Germany ===					
Alexander Föhr	List	Baden-Württemberg	2023	n/a	Outlisted (Note: Won the first vote for Heidelberg but was not seated due to CDU's insufficient second vote coverage in the state.)
Melis Sekmen	List (Note: Elected on the Alliance 90/The Greens list)	Baden-Württemberg	2021	n/a	Outlisted (Note: Won the first vote for Mannheim but was not seated due to CDU's insufficient second vote coverage in the state.)
Moritz Oppelt	Rhein-Neckar	Baden-Württemberg	2021	1949	Overhang
Maximilian Mörseburg	Stuttgart II	Baden-Württemberg	2021	2009	Overhang
Astrid Mannes	List	Hesse	2017 (Note: Unseated at the 2021 election, returned mid-term upon resignation of another MdB)	n/a	Outlisted (Note: Mannes regained the direct mandate for Darmstadt she previously held from 2017 to 2021, but was not seated due to CDU's insufficient second vote coverage in the state.)
Petra Nicolaisen	List	Schleswig-Holstein	2017	n/a	Outlisted (Note: Nicolaisen regained the direct mandate for Flensburg – Schleswig she previously held from 2017 to 2021, but was not seated due to CDU's insufficient second vote coverage in the state.)
=== Free Democratic Party ===					
Valentin Abel	List	Baden-Württemberg	2021	n/a	Party's failure to meet 5% threshold
Renata Alt	List	Baden-Württemberg	2017	n/a	Party's failure to meet 5% threshold
Jens Brandenburg	List	Baden-Württemberg	2017	n/a	Party's failure to meet 5% threshold
Martin Gassner-Herz	List	Baden-Württemberg	2021	n/a	Party's failure to meet 5% threshold
Julian Grünke	List	Baden-Württemberg	2024	n/a	Party's failure to meet 5% threshold
Ann-Veruschka Jurisch	List	Baden-Württemberg	2021	n/a	Party's failure to meet 5% threshold
Pascal Kober	List	Baden-Württemberg	2009 (Note: Unseated in 2013 along with all other FDP MdBs at the time when the party failed to meet the 5% threshold for the first time, but return to the Bundestag at the 2013 election)	n/a	Party's failure to meet 5% threshold
Michael Georg Link	List	Baden-Württemberg	2005	n/a	Party's failure to meet 5% threshold
Claudia Raffelhüschen	List	Baden-Württemberg	2021	n/a	Party's failure to meet 5% threshold
Stephan Seiter	List	Baden-Württemberg	2021	n/a	Party's failure to meet 5% threshold
Rainer Semet	List	Baden-Württemberg	2021	n/a	Party's failure to meet 5% threshold
Judith Skudelny	List	Baden-Württemberg	2017	n/a	Party's failure to meet 5% threshold
Konrad Stockmeier	List	Baden-Württemberg	2021	n/a	Party's failure to meet 5% threshold
Benjamin Strasser	List	Baden-Württemberg	2017	n/a	Party's failure to meet 5% threshold
Florian Toncar	List	Baden-Württemberg	2005	n/a	Party's failure to meet 5% threshold
Muhanad Al-Halak	List	Bavaria	2021	n/a	Party's failure to meet 5% threshold
Nicole Bauer	List	Bavaria	2017	n/a	Party's failure to meet 5% threshold
Sandra Bubendorfer-Licht	List	Bavaria	2019	n/a	Party's failure to meet 5% threshold
Daniel Föst	List	Bavaria	2017	n/a	Party's failure to meet 5% threshold
Maximilian Funke-Kaiser	List	Bavaria	2021	n/a	Party's failure to meet 5% threshold
Nils Gründer	List	Bavaria	2022	n/a	Party's failure to meet 5% threshold
Thomas Hacker	List	Bavaria	2017	n/a	Party's failure to meet 5% threshold
Katja Hessel	List	Bavaria	2017	n/a	Party's failure to meet 5% threshold
Karsten Klein	List	Bavaria	2017	n/a	Party's failure to meet 5% threshold
Lukas Köhler	List	Bavaria	2017	n/a	Party's failure to meet 5% threshold
Ulrich Lechte	List	Bavaria	2017	n/a	Party's failure to meet 5% threshold
Kristine Lütke	List	Bavaria	2021	n/a	Party's failure to meet 5% threshold
Stephan Thomae	List	Bavaria	2009	n/a	Party's failure to meet 5% threshold
Andrew Ullmann	List	Bavaria	2017	n/a	Party's failure to meet 5% threshold
Daniela Kluckert	List	Berlin	2017	n/a	Party's failure to meet 5% threshold
Christoph Meyer	List	Berlin	2017	n/a	Party's failure to meet 5% threshold
Friedhelm Boginski	List	Brandenburg	2021	n/a	Party's failure to meet 5% threshold
Linda Teuteberg	List	Brandenburg	2017	n/a	Party's failure to meet 5% threshold
Volker Redder	List	Bremen	2021	n/a	Party's failure to meet 5% threshold
Michael Kruse	List	Hamburg	2021	n/a	Party's failure to meet 5% threshold
Ria Schröder	List	Hamburg	2021	n/a	Party's failure to meet 5% threshold
Katja Adler	List	Hesse	2021	n/a	Party's failure to meet 5% threshold
Peter Heidt	List	Hesse	2019	n/a	Party's failure to meet 5% threshold
Jürgen Lenders	List	Hesse	2021	n/a	Party's failure to meet 5% threshold
Thorsten Lieb	List	Hesse	2021	n/a	Party's failure to meet 5% threshold
Till Mansmann	List	Hesse	2017	n/a	Party's failure to meet 5% threshold
Alexander Müller	List	Hesse	2017	n/a	Party's failure to meet 5% threshold
Bettina Stark-Watzinger	List	Hesse	2017	n/a	Party's failure to meet 5% threshold
Jens Beeck	List	Lower Saxony	2017	n/a	Party's failure to meet 5% threshold
Christian Dürr	List	Lower Saxony	2017	n/a	Party's failure to meet 5% threshold
Anikó Glogowski-Merten	List	Lower Saxony	2021	n/a	Party's failure to meet 5% threshold
Gero Clemens Hocker	List	Lower Saxony	2017	n/a	Party's failure to meet 5% threshold
Konstantin Kuhle	List	Lower Saxony	2017	n/a	Party's failure to meet 5% threshold
Anja Schulz	List	Lower Saxony	2021	n/a	Party's failure to meet 5% threshold
Christian Bartelt	List	Mecklenburg-Vorpommern	2023	n/a	Party's failure to meet 5% threshold
Christian Lindner	List	North Rhine-Westphalia	2009 (Note: Resigned in 2012 to become FDP Leader in the Landtag of North Rhine-Westphalia, return to the Bundestag as FDP lead candidate in the 2017 election.)	n/a	Party's failure to meet 5% threshold
Marco Buschmann	List	North Rhine-Westphalia	2009	n/a	Party's failure to meet 5% threshold
Karlheinz Busen	List	North Rhine-Westphalia	2017	n/a	Party's failure to meet 5% threshold
Carl-Julius Cronenberg	List	North Rhine-Westphalia	2017	n/a	Party's failure to meet 5% threshold
Bijan Djir-Sarai	List	North Rhine-Westphalia	2009	n/a	Party's failure to meet 5% threshold
Otto Fricke	List	North Rhine-Westphalia	2002	n/a	Party's failure to meet 5% threshold
Fabian Griewel	List	North Rhine-Westphalia	2024	n/a	Party's failure to meet 5% threshold
Katrin Helling-Plahr	List	North Rhine-Westphalia	2017	n/a	Party's failure to meet 5% threshold
Markus Herbrand	List	North Rhine-Westphalia	2017	n/a	Party's failure to meet 5% threshold
Olaf in der Beek	List	North Rhine-Westphalia	2017	n/a	Party's failure to meet 5% threshold
Bernd Reuther	List	North Rhine-Westphalia	2017	n/a	Party's failure to meet 5% threshold
Christian Sauter	List	North Rhine-Westphalia	2017	n/a	Party's failure to meet 5% threshold
Frank Schäffler	List	North Rhine-Westphalia	2005	n/a	Party's failure to meet 5% threshold
Jens Teutrine	List	North Rhine-Westphalia	2021	n/a	Party's failure to meet 5% threshold
Johannes Vogel	List	North Rhine-Westphalia	2009	n/a	Party's failure to meet 5% threshold
Nicole Westig	List	North Rhine-Westphalia	2017	n/a	Party's failure to meet 5% threshold
Katharina Willkomm	List	North Rhine-Westphalia	2017	n/a	Party's failure to meet 5% threshold
Manuel Höferlin	List	Rhineland-Palatinate	2009	n/a	Party's failure to meet 5% threshold
Carina Konrad	List	Rhineland-Palatinate	2017	n/a	Party's failure to meet 5% threshold
Sandra Weeser	List	Rhineland-Palatinate	2017	n/a	Party's failure to meet 5% threshold
Oliver Luksic	List	Saarland	2009	n/a	Party's failure to meet 5% threshold
Philipp Hartewig	List	Saxony	2021	n/a	Party's failure to meet 5% threshold
Ulrike Harzer	List	Saxony	2021	n/a	Party's failure to meet 5% threshold
Torsten Herbst	List	Saxony	2017	n/a	Party's failure to meet 5% threshold
Frank Müller-Rosentritt	List	Saxony	2017	n/a	Party's failure to meet 5% threshold
Nico Tippelt	List	Saxony	2021	n/a	Party's failure to meet 5% threshold
Marcus Faber	List	Saxony-Anhalt	2017	n/a	Party's failure to meet 5% threshold
Gyde Jensen	List	Schleswig-Holstein	2017	n/a	Party's failure to meet 5% threshold
Wolfgang Kubicki	List	Schleswig-Holstein	1990 (Note: Resign in 1992 to be FDP leader in Schleswig-Holstein, elected to Bundestag again in 2002 election but only served for two months, and again in 2017 as FDP lead candidate in the state.)	n/a	Party's failure to meet 5% threshold
Maximilian Mordhorst	List	Schleswig-Holstein	2021	n/a	Party's failure to meet 5% threshold
Gerald Ullrich	List	Thuringia	2017	n/a	Party's failure to meet 5% threshold
Tim Wagner	List	Thuringia	2017	n/a	Party's failure to meet 5% threshold
=== Alliance 90/The Greens ===					
Katharina Beck	List	Hamburg	2021		Outlisted
Kathrin Henneberger	List	North Rhine-Westphalia	2021		Outlisted
=== Social Democratic Party of Germany ===					
Ana-Maria Trăsnea	List	Berlin	2023	n/a	Outlisted
Wiebke Papenbrock	Prignitz – Ostprignitz-Ruppin – Havelland I	Brandenburg	2021	2021	Götz Frömming (AfD)
Mathias Papendieck	Frankfurt (Oder) – Oder-Spree	Brandenburg	2021	2021	Rainer Galla (AfD)
Hannes Walter	Elbe-Elster – Oberspreewald-Lausitz	Brandenburg	2021	2021	Birgit Bessin (AfD)
Simona Koß	Märkisch-Oderland – Barnim II	Brandenburg	2021	2021	René Springer (AfD)
Ariane Fäscher	Oberhavel – Havelland II	Brandenburg	2021	2021	Andreas Galau (AfD) (Note: First vote winner not seated due to their party's insufficient second votes cover.)
Dorothee Martin	Hamburg-Nord	Hamburg	2020	2021	Christoph Ploß (CDU)
Lennard Oehl	Hanau	Hesse	2021	2021	Pascal Reddig (CDU)
Jens Zimmermann	Odenwald	Hesse	2013	2021	Patricia Lips (CDU)
Rebecca Schamber	Hannover-Land I	Lower Saxony	2021	2021	Hendrik Hoppenstedt (CDU)
Daniel Schneider	Cuxhaven – Stade II	Lower Saxony	2021	2021	Christoph Frauenpreiß (CDU)
Katrin Zschau	Rostock – Landkreis Rostock II	Mecklenburg-Vorpommern	2021	2021	Steffi Burmeister (AfD)
Anna Kassautzki	Vorpommern-Rügen – Vorpommern-Greifswald I	Mecklenburg-Vorpommern	2021	2021	Dario Seifert (AfD)
Erik von Malottki	Mecklenburgische Seenplatte I – Vorpommern-Greifswald II	Mecklenburg-Vorpommern	2021	2021	Enrico Komning (AfD)
Brian Nickholz	Recklinghausen II	North Rhine-Westphalia	2021	1965	Lars Ehm (CDU)
Axel Echeverria	Ennepe-Ruhr-Kreis II	North Rhine-Westphalia	2021	1949	Katja Strauss-Köster (CDU)
Ingo Schäfer	Solingen – Remscheid – Wuppertal II	North Rhine-Westphalia	2021	2021	Jürgen Hardt (CDU)
Joe Weingarten	Kreuznach	Rhineland-Palatinate	2019	2021	Julia Klöckner (CDU)
Detlef Müller	Chemnitz	Saxony	2005	2021	Alexander Gauland (AfD)
Herbert Wollmann	Altmark – Jerichower Land	Saxony-Anhalt	2021	2021	Thomas Korell (AfD)
Kristian Klinck	Plön – Neumünster	Schleswig-Holstein	2021	2021	Sandra Carstensen (CDU)

== Gallery ==
CDU-CSU vote

AfD vote

SPD vote

Grüne vote

Linke vote

BSW vote

FDP vote

FW vote
