= Tiemann =

Tiemann is a surname. Notable people with the surname include:

- Christoph Tiemann (born 1977), German actor, writer, playwright, audio theatre producer and broadcaster
- Daniel F. Tiemann (1805–1899), mayor of New York
- Dietlind Tiemann (born 1955), German politician (CDU)
- Edmund C. Tiemann (1922–2009), American businessman, politician, and military officer
- Ferdinand Tiemann (1848–1899), German chemist and discoverer of the Reimer–Tiemann reaction
- Norbert Tiemann (1924–2012), American politician
- Marcel Tiemann (born 1974), German racing driver
- Neal Tiemann (born 1982), American guitarist
- Michael Tiemann, free software programmer
- Robert L. Tiemann, American baseball historian and author
- Otto Tiemann (1890–1952), German Wehrmacht general

== See also ==
- Tiemann's catheter
