= Arne Raue =

German politician (born 1970)

Arne Raue MdB

Member of the Bundestag; for Brandenburg an der Havel – Potsdam-Mittelmark I – Havelland III – Teltow-Fläming I
- Incumbent
- Assumed office 25 March 2025
- Preceded by: Sonja Eichwede

Personal details
- Born: 18 August 1970 (age 56) Potsdam, East Germany
- Party: Alternative for Germany (since 2024)

Arne Raue (born 18 August 1970) is a German politician who was elected as a member of the Bundestag in 2025. He has served as mayor of Jüterbog since 2011.
