= Landgericht =

Landgericht may refer to:

- Landgericht (Germany), a mid-level court in the present-day judicial system of Germany
  For example,
  - Landgericht Berlin
  - Landgericht Bremen
- Landgericht (medieval), a regional magistracy in the Holy Roman Empire
