= Ariane Fäscher =

German politician (born 1968)

- Fäscher in 2021

Member of the Bundestag; for Oberhavel – Havelland II
- In office 26 October 2021 – 25 March 2025
- Preceded by: Uwe Feiler
- Succeeded by: Seat vacant

Personal details
- Born: 1 March 1968 (age 58) Münster, West Germany
- Party: Social Democratic
- Children: 2
- Education: University of Mainz

Ariane Fäscher (born 1 March 1968) is a German politician of the Social Democratic Party (SPD) who served as a member of the Bundestag from 2021 to 2025.

== Early life and career ==
Fäscher graduated from high school in Offenbach am Main in 1987 and then studied journalism, politics and business administration at the Johannes Gutenberg University of Mainz until 1994. She then worked professionally in Erfurt, where she worked from 1995 as a marketing and public relations officer at the Thuringia state development company and then from 1998 as press spokeswoman for Messe Erfurt. In 2001, she moved with her husband to Hohen Neuendorf in Brandenburg and initially worked as a freelance journalist and PR consultant before she was employed as a press and public relations officer at the Hohen Neuendorf town administration from 2009. In 2014, she became head of the marketing department there.

In addition, Fäscher works as a hypnotherapist, systemic coach and management consultant.

== Political career ==
=== Career in local politics ===
From 2014 to 2016, Fäscher was second deputy mayor of the town of Hohen Neuendorf.

=== Member of the German Parliament (2021–2025) ===
In March 2021, in the SPD, she prevailed against two opposing candidates for the nomination as Bundestag candidate in the Oberhavel-Havelland II constituency for the upcoming 2021 federal election. In the Bundestag elections, she was able to assert herself with 26.3% of the first votes in the constituency against the incumbent Uwe Feiler (CDU) and win the direct mandate.

In parliament, Fäscher has since been serving on the Committee on European Affairs, and the Committee on Family Affairs, Senior Citizens, Women and Youth.

In addition to her committee assignments, Fäscher has been part of the German-Irish Parliamentary Friendship Group. In February 2025, Fäscher lost her seat in Bundestag.

== Other activities ==
- German United Services Trade Union (ver.di), Member

== Personal life ==
Fascher is non-denominational, married and the mother of two daughters.
