= Angelika Krüger-Leißner =

German politician

Member of the Bundestag
- In office 25 February 2017 – 24 October 2017
- Preceded by: Frank-Walter Steinmeier
- Succeeded by: Dietlind Tiemann
- Constituency: Brandenburg an der Havel – Potsdam-Mittelmark I – Havelland III – Teltow-Fläming I
- In office 26 October 1998 – 22 October 2013
- Preceded by: Wolfgang Ilte
- Succeeded by: Uwe Feiler
- Constituency: Oranienburg – Nauen (1998–2002); Oberhavel – Havelland II (2002–2013)

Personal details
- Born: Angelika Lüdke; 13 August 1951 (age 75) Jüterbog, East Germany
- Party: Social Democratic
- Children: 2

Angelika Krüger-Leißner (née Lüdke; born 13 August 1951) is a German politician with the Social Democratic Party of Germany (SPD).

Krüger-Leißner was a member of the Bundestag from 1998 to 2013 and again briefly in 2017. Among other things, she was vice-chair of the Committee on Labour and Social Affairs and the Subcommittee on Foreign Cultural and Education Policy. In addition, she was film policy spokeswoman for the SPD parliamentary group.

== Early life and career ==
Krüger-Leißner was born in Jüterbog. After graduating from high school with a simultaneous qualification as a railway worker in 1970 at the Extended High School (EOS) in Jüterbog, Krüger-Leißner completed a degree in art education and history in Leipzig, which she completed in 1974 as a qualified teacher. She then worked as a teacher in Jüterbog and Schönwalde until 1987. From 1988 to 1989 she completed additional studies in youth welfare. From 1990 to 1998 she was an alderman and department head in the Nauen and Havelland districts.

== Political career ==
Krüger-Leißner joined the SPD in 1990 and was on the Brandenburg state executive board from 1998 to 2002.

From 1990 to 1994 Krüger-Leißner was a member of the Nauen district council. From 1998 to 2008 she was a member of the district council in the Havelland district.

From 1998 to 2013 she was a member of the German Bundestag. Among other things, she was deputy chairwoman of the Labour and Social Affairs Committee and deputy chairwoman of the subcommittee for foreign cultural and educational policy of the German Bundestag.

Krüger-Leißner was a directly elected member of the Bundestag, initially in 1998 for the Oranienburg - Nauen constituency and from 2002 as a member of the Oberhavel - Havelland II constituency. In the 2005 federal election she received 41.9% of the first votes. In the 2013 federal election, however, she missed returning to parliament after 15 years because she lost her direct mandate and initially did not get her place on the list.

On 25 February 2017, she replaced Frank-Walter Steinmeier, who had resigned from his mandate due to his election as Federal President, in parliament via the state list.

== Political positions ==
=== Internet blocks ===
In August 2009, Ms. Krüger-Leißner expressed herself very positively about the French plans for the three-strikes rule, according to which bootleggers would be blocked from the Internet after they were caught three times. She explained: “We have strong fundamental rights anchored in our Basic Law, but they sometimes prevent us from finding simple, clear solutions.” From Ms. Krüger-Leißner's point of view, rights holders should fundamentally be entitled to better and more consistent protection of intellectual property. Krüger-Leißner described the alternative approach of a cultural flat rate as still “very vague” and “unusable” in its current form. She sees it as “unfair” because the type and intensity of use is different and new costs are imposed on the citizen.

== Voluntary memberships ==
Deputy Chairwoman of the Youth Development Organisation Nauen e. V.
