= Melrose, Minnesota =

City in Minnesota, United States

Melrose
- City
- Location of Melrose within Stearns County, Minnesota
- Coordinates: 45°40′32″N 94°48′46″W
- Country: United States
- State: Minnesota
- County: Stearns

Government
  - Mayor: Joe Finken

Area
  - Total: 3.31 sq mi (8.56 km^{2})
  - Land: 3.17 sq mi (8.22 km^{2})
  - Water: 0.13 sq mi (0.34 km^{2})
- Elevation: 1,214 ft (370 m)

Population (2020)
  - Total: 3,602
  - Density: 1,134.7/sq mi (438.12/km^{2})
- Time zone: UTC-6 (Central (CST))
  - Summer (DST): UTC-5 (CDT)
- ZIP code: 56352
- Area code: 320
- FIPS code: 27-41570
- GNIS feature ID: 2395088
- Website: www.cityofmelrose.com

Melrose is a city in Stearns County, Minnesota, United States. The population was 3,602 at the 2020 census. It is part of the St. Cloud metropolitan area.

== Geography ==
According to the United States Census Bureau, the city has an area of 3.32 square miles (8.60 km^{2}); 3.19 square miles (8.26 km^{2}) is land and 0.13 square miles (0.34 km^{2}) is water.

Melrose is along Interstate 94/U.S. Highway 52. Other main routes include Stearns County Road 13 and Main Street.

=== Climate ===
Climate data for Melrose, Minnesota, 1991–2020 normals, extremes 1960–2022
Month	Jan	Feb	Mar	Apr	May	Jun	Jul	Aug	Sep	Oct	Nov	Dec	Year
Record high °F (°C)	59 (15)	58 (14)	77 (25)	95 (35)	97 (36)	102 (39)	103 (39)	101 (38)	98 (37)	90 (32)	77 (25)	59 (15)	103 (39)
Mean maximum °F (°C)	40.3 (4.6)	43.9 (6.6)	60.0 (15.6)	76.3 (24.6)	86.9 (30.5)	92.1 (33.4)	92.2 (33.4)	90.4 (32.4)	86.1 (30.1)	79.9 (26.6)	59.9 (15.5)	43.1 (6.2)	94.7 (34.8)
Mean daily maximum °F (°C)	19.5 (−6.9)	24.6 (−4.1)	37.2 (2.9)	53.0 (11.7)	66.7 (19.3)	76.6 (24.8)	80.9 (27.2)	78.6 (25.9)	70.2 (21.2)	55.6 (13.1)	38.6 (3.7)	25.0 (−3.9)	52.2 (11.2)
Daily mean °F (°C)	9.8 (−12.3)	14.0 (−10.0)	27.2 (−2.7)	41.9 (5.5)	55.8 (13.2)	66.5 (19.2)	70.4 (21.3)	68.1 (20.1)	59.0 (15.0)	45.1 (7.3)	30.0 (−1.1)	16.5 (−8.6)	42.0 (5.6)
Mean daily minimum °F (°C)	0.1 (−17.7)	3.4 (−15.9)	17.1 (−8.3)	30.9 (−0.6)	44.9 (7.2)	56.3 (13.5)	60.0 (15.6)	57.6 (14.2)	47.9 (8.8)	34.7 (1.5)	21.3 (−5.9)	8.1 (−13.3)	31.9 (−0.1)
Mean minimum °F (°C)	−22.6 (−30.3)	−17.6 (−27.6)	−7.0 (−21.7)	15.7 (−9.1)	31.5 (−0.3)	42.9 (6.1)	48.3 (9.1)	45.9 (7.7)	32.6 (0.3)	20.3 (−6.5)	3.0 (−16.1)	−14.8 (−26.0)	−25.3 (−31.8)
Record low °F (°C)	−41 (−41)	−38 (−39)	−31 (−35)	−3 (−19)	19 (−7)	33 (1)	38 (3)	35 (2)	20 (−7)	8 (−13)	−22 (−30)	−36 (−38)	−41 (−41)
Average precipitation inches (mm)	0.68 (17)	0.71 (18)	1.43 (36)	2.61 (66)	3.61 (92)	4.22 (107)	4.34 (110)	3.76 (96)	2.78 (71)	2.84 (72)	1.21 (31)	0.89 (23)	29.08 (739)
Average snowfall inches (cm)	5.0 (13)	9.0 (23)	7.2 (18)	5.1 (13)	0.2 (0.51)	0.0 (0.0)	0.0 (0.0)	0.0 (0.0)	0.0 (0.0)	0.4 (1.0)	4.0 (10)	8.1 (21)	39.0 (99)
Average precipitation days (≥ 0.01 in)	4.8	4.3	5.6	7.8	10.2	10.5	9.9	8.4	8.3	8.3	4.9	5.5	88.5
Average snowy days (≥ 0.1 in)	4.5	3.9	2.9	1.5	0.1	0.0	0.0	0.0	0.0	0.3	2.0	4.8	20.0
Source 1: NOAA
Source 2: National Weather Service

== Demographics ==
Historical population
Census	Pop.	Note	%±
1890	780		—
1900	1,768		126.7%
1910	2,591		46.5%
1920	2,529		−2.4%
1930	1,801		−28.8%
1940	2,015		11.9%
1950	2,106		4.5%
1960	2,135		1.4%
1970	2,273		6.5%
1980	2,409		6.0%
1990	2,561		6.3%
2000	3,091		20.7%
2010	3,598		16.4%
2020	3,602		0.1%
U.S. Decennial Census

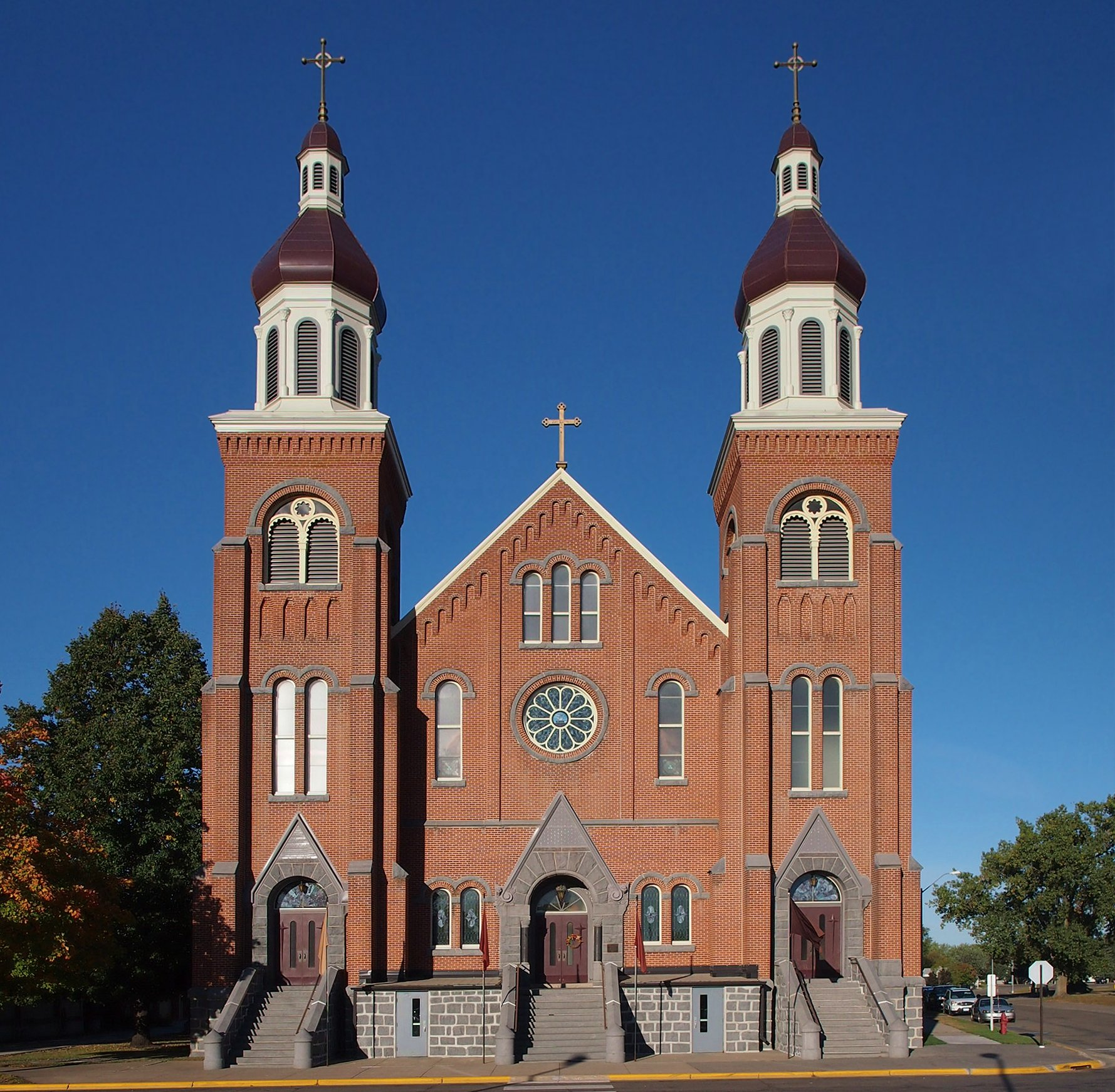
The Church of St. Mary, (formerly St. Boniface Church) in Melrose

=== 2020 census ===
As of the 2020 census, Melrose had a population of 3,602. The median age was 38.5 years. 26.8% of residents were under the age of 18 and 19.3% of residents were 65 years of age or older. For every 100 females there were 98.1 males, and for every 100 females age 18 and over there were 96.4 males age 18 and over.

0.0% of residents lived in urban areas, while 100.0% lived in rural areas.

There were 1,333 households in Melrose, of which 31.9% had children under the age of 18 living in them. Of all households, 51.8% were married-couple households, 17.7% were households with a male householder and no spouse or partner present, and 24.0% were households with a female householder and no spouse or partner present. About 31.0% of all households were made up of individuals and 17.5% had someone living alone who was 65 years of age or older.

There were 1,403 housing units, of which 5.0% were vacant. The homeowner vacancy rate was 0.7% and the rental vacancy rate was 6.3%.

Racial composition as of the 2020 census
Race	Number	Percent
White	2,506	69.6%
Black or African American	18	0.5%
American Indian and Alaska Native	19	0.5%
Asian	9	0.2%
Native Hawaiian and Other Pacific Islander	0	0.0%
Some other race	814	22.6%
Two or more races	236	6.6%
Hispanic or Latino (of any race)	1,093	30.3%

=== 2010 census ===
As of the census of 2010, there were 3,598 people, 1,309 households, and 890 families living in the city. The population density was 1,127.9 inhabitants per square mile (435.5/km^{2}). There were 1,410 housing units at an average density of 442.0 per square mile (170.7/km^{2}). The racial makeup of the city was 86.1% White, 0.9% African American, 0.2% Native American, 0.6% Asian, 10.7% from other races, and 1.4% from two or more races. Hispanic or Latino of any race were 22.1% of the population.

There were 1,309 households, of which 34.8% had children under the age of 18 living with them, 55.2% were married couples living together, 7.6% had a female householder with no husband present, 5.2% had a male householder with no wife present, and 32% were non-families. 28.1% of all households were made up of individuals, and 15.9% had someone living alone who was 65 years of age or older. The average household size was 2.69 and the average family size was 3.31.

The median age in the city was 36.5 years. 28.1% of residents were under the age of 18; 8.2% were between the ages of 18 and 24; 24.6% were from 25 to 44; 20.4% were from 45 to 64; and 18.9% were 65 years of age or older. The gender makeup of the city was 49.6% male and 50.4% female.

=== 2000 census ===
As of the census of 2000, there were 3,091 people, 1,157 households, and 797 families living in the city. The population density was 1,091.8 inhabitants per square mile (421.5/km^{2}). There were 1,206 housing units at an average density of 426.0 per square mile (164.5/km^{2}). The racial makeup of the city was 95.76% White, 0.49% African American, 0.06% Native American, 0.55% Asian, 2.52% from other races, and 0.61% from two or more races. Hispanic or Latino of any race were 12.33% of the population.

There were 1,157 households, out of which 35.7% had children under the age of 18 living with them, 57.4% were married couples living together, 7.9% had a female householder with no husband present, and 31.1% were non-families. 27.9% of all households were made up of individuals, and 17.4% had someone living alone who was 65 years of age or older. The average household size was 2.61 and the average family size was 3.16. In the city, the population was spread out, with 27.7% under the age of 18, 8.1% from 18 to 24, 26.7% from 25 to 44, 17.4% from 45 to 64, and 20.1% who were 65 years of age or older. The median age was 36 years. For every 100 females, there were 94.5 males. For every 100 females age 18 and over, there were 93.8 males.

The median income for a household in the city was $34,432, and the median income for a family was $45,045. Males had a median income of $30,290 versus $20,389 for females. The per capita income for the city was $15,510. About 4.5% of families and 7.6% of the population were below the poverty line, including 7.8% of those under age 18 and 7.8% of those age 65 or over.

== Notable people ==
- Walter Breuning, the oldest man in the world when he died on April 14, 2011; born in Melrose in 1896.
- Mitch Clem, cartoonist, creator of Nothing Nice to Say
- Bill Daley, football player
- Paul Ellering, professional wrestling manager
- Blake Elliott, winner of the 2003 Gagliardi Trophy for academic and football excellence.
- Calista Flockhart, actress and star of Ally McBeal; lived in Melrose during part of her childhood
- Matt Herkenhoff, professional football player.
- Charles Lindbergh, first person to fly across the Atlantic Ocean without stopping. Lived in Melrose
- Joseph T. Niehaus Sr., Minnesota state legislator, businessman, farmer, and beekeeper, born on a farm near Melrose.
- Mark Olberding, professional basketball player.
- Amanda Smock, Olympic triple jumper; she grew up in Melrose.
- Morvalden Angerstoff Taylor, Minnesota state legislator, farmer, and postmaster.
- Edmund C. Tiemann, Minnesota state legislator
- Alan Welle, Minnesota state legislator and businessman
