= Church of St. Mary (Melrose, Minnesota) =

Historic church in Minnesota, United States

- Church of St. Boniface
- U.S. National Register of Historic Places
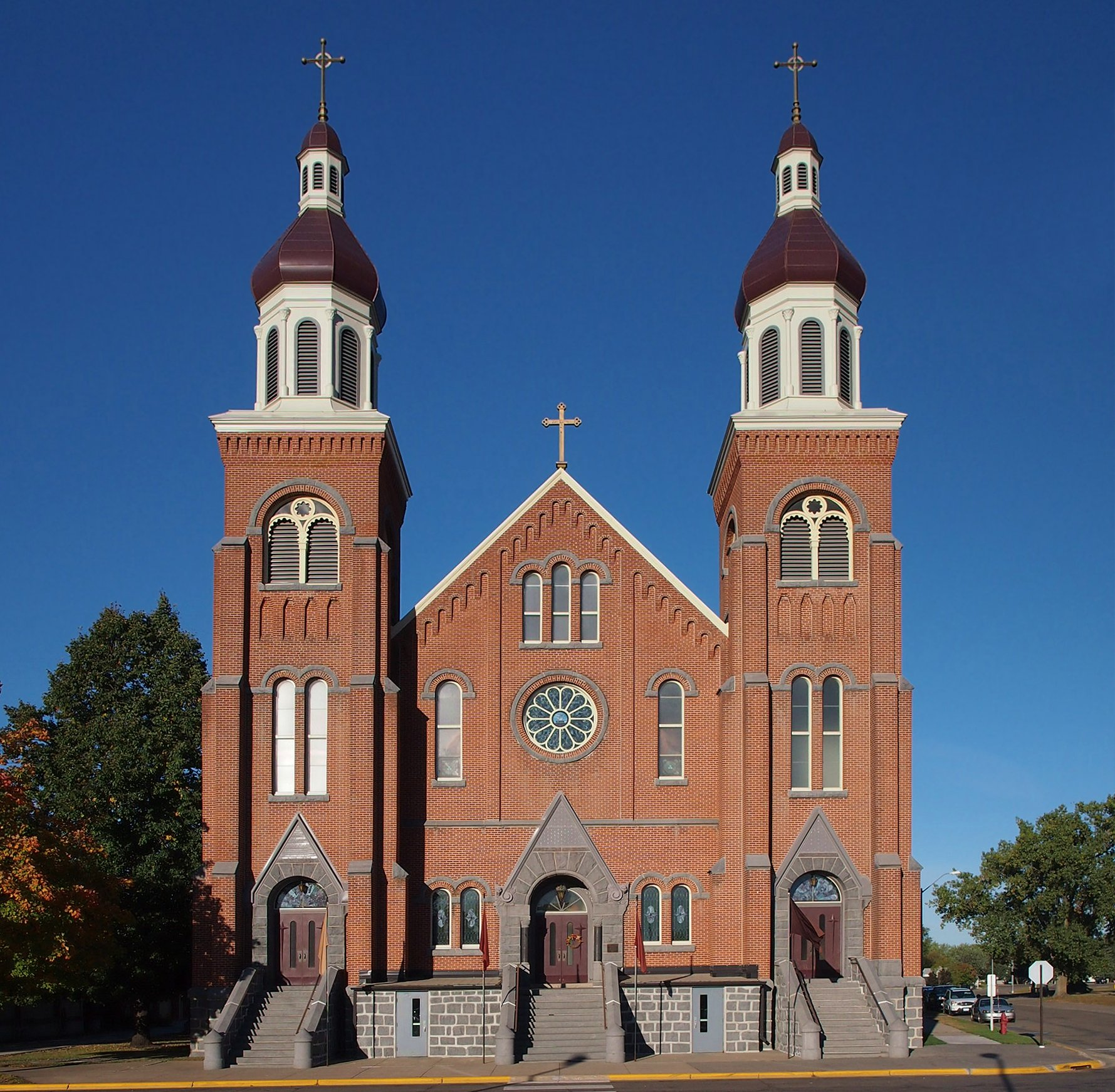
- The Church of St. Mary in 2015

- Location within Minnesota Location within the United States
- Location: 203 5th Avenue Southeast, Melrose, Minnesota
- Coordinates: 45°40′21″N 94°48′28″W
- Area: Less than one acre
- Built: 1899 (church), 1907 (rectory)
- Built by: E. D. Richmond
- Architect: George Bergmann
- Architectural style: Romanesque Revival (church), Queen Anne (rectory)
- NRHP reference No.: 93001234
- Designated: November 12, 1993

The Church of St. Mary, formerly the Church of St. Boniface, was a historic Roman Catholic church in Melrose, Minnesota, United States. The church and the adjacent 1907 rectory were listed together on the National Register of Historic Places in 1993 for having local significance in the themes of European ethnic heritage and social history. The property was nominated to the Register as a manifestation of the importance of ethnic parishes in the cultural and religious life of Minnesota's rural German American populace in the 19th and early 20th centuries.

On March 11, 2016, the Church of St. Mary was heavily damaged by a fire. Demolition of the church began on May 19, 2020, and a new $10 million church was built nearby.

== History ==
The parish was founded in 1878 by German immigrants, six years after a nearby parish, St. Patrick's, was founded by Irish immigrants. The first building was a wood-frame structure, built in 1879 at a cost of $3,000. In 1882, they established a Catholic school and a convent. The current building was dedicated in 1898 and built for $50,000. The old building became a school, but it was destroyed in a fire in 1910.

In 1958 the bishop of the Diocese of St. Cloud decided that St. Boniface and St. Patrick would merge into a new parish named St. Mary's. St. Patrick's parish was outgrowing its space and was looking for new room. In 1970, the St. Patrick's church building was demolished. The church is now part of a four-parish cluster with parishes in Meire Grove, Greenwald, and Spring Hill.

On March 11, 2016, the Church of St. Mary was heavily damaged by a fire. No people were injured, and the blaze was extinguished before the roof or exterior walls were lost. Investigators announced in May that the fire had been set deliberately. Despite many attempts made by local church goers and community members to restore the 122-year-old church, demolition of the building began on May 19, 2020.

== See also ==
- List of Catholic churches in the United States
- National Register of Historic Places listings in Stearns County, Minnesota
