= Sonja Eichwede =

German lawyer and politician

Sonja Eichwede MdB
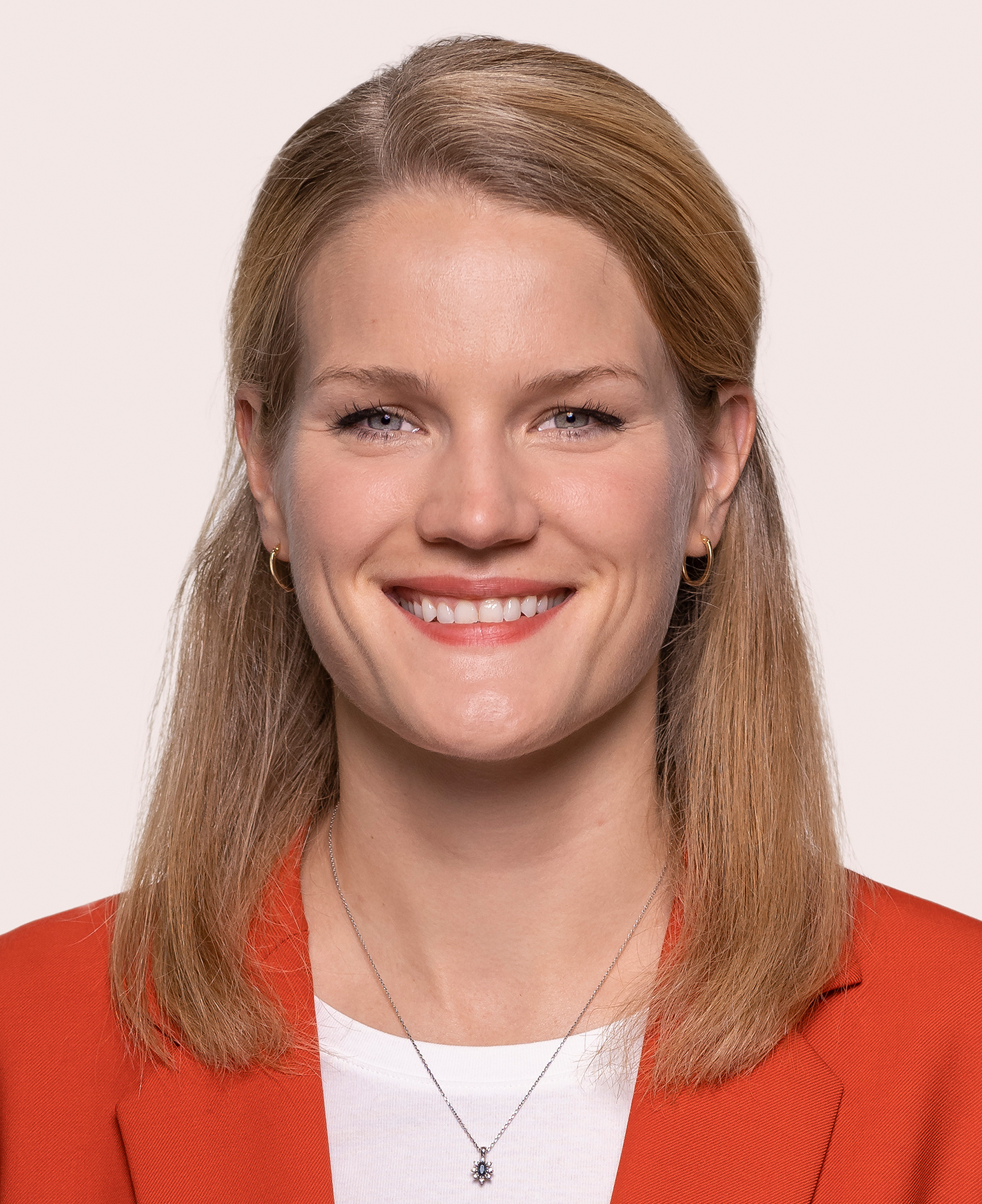
- Eichwede in 2021

Member of the Bundestag; from Brandenburg
- Incumbent
- Assumed office 26 October 2021
- Preceded by: Dietlind Tiemann
- Constituency: Brandenburg an der Havel – Potsdam-Mittelmark I – Havelland III – Teltow-Fläming I (2021–2025); State list (2025–present)

Personal details
- Born: 25 October 1987 (age 38) Bremen, West Germany
- Party: Social Democratic
- Children: 1
- Education: University of Tübingen

Sonja Katharina Eichwede (born 25 October 1987) is a German lawyer and politician representing the Social Democratic Party of Germany. She was elected to the Bundestag in the 2021 German federal election.

== Early life and career ==
Eichwede was born in Bremen. She studied and passed the Abitur school leavers' exam at Kippenberg-Gymnasium in Bremen in 2007. After graduating, she studied Jurisprudence at the University of Tübingen, graduating in 2013. As part of her studies, she completed an Erasmus exchange in Oslo in 2010. In 2013, Eichwede passed the first German state examination in law, and following this worked as a trainee lawyer at the Landgericht Bremen until 2015.

== Political career ==
Eichwede stood as a candidate in the 2021 federal elections for the Brandenburg an der Havel – Potsdam-Mittelmark I – Havelland III – Teltow-Fläming I constituency in Brandenburg. She won a direct mandate with 32.1% of first preference votes, beating Christian Democratic Union candidate Dietlind Tiemann, among others.

In parliament, Eichwede has since been serving on the Committee on the Scrutiny of Elections, Immunity and the Rules of Procedure. She also served on the Committee on the Election of Judges (Wahlausschuss), which is in charge of appointing judges to the Federal Constitutional Court of Germany, and on the parliamentary body in charge of appointing judges to the Highest Courts of Justice, namely the Federal Court of Justice (BGH), the Federal Administrative Court (BVerwG), the Federal Fiscal Court (BFH), the Federal Labour Court (BAG), and the Federal Social Court (BSG). From 2021 to 2025, she was her parliamentary group’s spokesperson for legal affairs.

In the negotiations to form a Grand Coalition under the leadership of Friedrich Merz's Christian Democrats (CDU together with the Bavarian CSU) and the SPD following the 2025 German elections, Eichwede led the SPD delegation in the working group on government reform and cutting red tape; her counterparts from the other parties were Philipp Amthor and Daniela Ludwig.

Since 2025, Eichwede has been serving as deputy chair of her parliamentary group, under the leadership of chairman Matthias Miersch. In this capacity, she oversees the group’s legislative activities on legal affairs, consumer protection, petitions and sports. Also since 2025, she has been part of the Parliamentary Oversight Panel (PKGr), which provides parliamentary oversight of Germany's intelligence services BND, BfV and MAD.

== Personal life ==
In 2023, Eichwede gave birth to a son. She is an evangelical Christian.
