= Oberhavel – Havelland II =

Federal electoral district of Germany

58 Oberhavel – Havelland II
- Electoral district for the Bundestag
- Oberhavel – Havelland II in 2025
- State: Brandenburg
- Population: 305,100 (2019)
- Electorate: 249,331 (2021)
- Major settlements: Oranienburg; Falkensee; Hennigsdorf
- Area: 2,206.2 km^{2}

Current electoral district
- Created: 1990
- Party: AfD
- Member: Vacant
- Elected: 2025

Oberhavel – Havelland II is an electoral constituency (German: Wahlkreis) represented in the Bundestag. It elects one member via first-past-the-post voting. Under the current constituency numbering system, it is designated as constituency 58. It is located in northern Brandenburg, comprising the Oberhavel district and eastern parts of the Havelland district.

Oberhavel – Havelland II was created for the inaugural 1990 federal election after German reunification. From 2021, to 2025 it was represented by Ariane Fäscher of the Social Democratic Party (SPD). In 2025 it was won by Andreas Galau of the AfD, but is still vacant.

== Geography ==
Oberhavel – Havelland II is located in northern Brandenburg. As of the 2021 federal election, it comprises the entirety of the Oberhavel district and the municipalities of Brieselang, Dallgow-Döberitz, Falkensee, Ketzin, Schönwalde-Glien, and Wustermark from the Havelland district.

== History ==
Oberhavel – Havelland II was created after German reunification in 1990, then known as Oranienburg – Nauen. It acquired its current name in the 2002 election. In the 1990 through 1998 elections, it was constituency 273 in the numbering system. In the 2002 and 2005 elections, it was number 58. In the 2009 election, it was number 59. Since the 2013 election, it has been number 58.

Originally, the constituency comprised the districts of Oranienburg and Nauen. It acquired its current configuration in the 2002 election. Upon the abolition of the Nauen-Land Amt ahead of the 2005 election, the municipality of Retzow and the former municipality of Selbelang were transferred out of the constituency. In the 2017 election, it lost the municipality of Nauen.

Election	No.	Name	Borders
1990	273	Oranienburg – Nauen	Oranienburg district; Nauen district
1994	273	Oranienburg – Nauen	Oranienburg district; Nauen district
1998	273	Oranienburg – Nauen	Oranienburg district; Nauen district
2002	58	Oberhavel – Havelland II	Oberhavel district; Havelland district (only Brieselang, Dallgow-Döberitz, Falkensee, Ketzin, Nauen, Schönwalde-Glien, and Wustermark municipalities and Nauen-Land Amt)
2005	58	Oberhavel – Havelland II	Oberhavel district; Havelland district (only Brieselang, Dallgow-Döberitz, Falkensee, Ketzin, Nauen, Schönwalde-Glien, and Wustermark municipalities)
2009	59	Oberhavel – Havelland II	Oberhavel district; Havelland district (only Brieselang, Dallgow-Döberitz, Falkensee, Ketzin, Nauen, Schönwalde-Glien, and Wustermark municipalities)
2013	58	Oberhavel – Havelland II	Oberhavel district; Havelland district (only Brieselang, Dallgow-Döberitz, Falkensee, Ketzin, Nauen, Schönwalde-Glien, and Wustermark municipalities)
2017	58	Oberhavel – Havelland II	Oberhavel district; Havelland district (only Brieselang, Dallgow-Döberitz, Falkensee, Ketzin, Schönwalde-Glien, and Wustermark municipalities and Nauen-Land Amt)
2021	58	Oberhavel – Havelland II	Oberhavel district; Havelland district (only Brieselang, Dallgow-Döberitz, Falkensee, Ketzin, Schönwalde-Glien, and Wustermark municipalities and Nauen-Land Amt)
2025	58	Oberhavel – Havelland II	Oberhavel district; Havelland district (only Brieselang, Dallgow-Döberitz, Falkensee, Ketzin, Schönwalde-Glien, and Wustermark municipalities and Nauen-Land Amt)

== Members ==
The constituency was first represented by Karl-Heinz Schröter of the Social Democratic Party (SPD) from 1990 to 1994, followed by Wolfgang Ilte from 1994 to 1998. Angelika Krüger-Leißner then served from 1998 to 2013. In 2013, it was won by Uwe Feiler of the Christian Democratic Union (CDU). Ariane Fäscher regained it for the SPD in 2021.

Election	Member	Party	%
1990	Karl-Heinz Schröter	SPD	37.4
1994	Wolfgang Ilte	SPD	48.8
1998	Angelika Krüger-Leißner	SPD	49.6
2002	Angelika Krüger-Leißner	SPD	45.0
2005	Angelika Krüger-Leißner	SPD	41.9
2009	Angelika Krüger-Leißner	SPD	29.2
2013	Uwe Feiler	CDU	37.5
2017	Uwe Feiler	CDU	29.9
2021	Ariane Fäscher	SPD	26.3
2025	Vacant (Note: Andreas Galau (AfD) won with 30.8% but seat remained vacant due to insufficient second votes cover.)		

== Election results ==
=== 2025 election ===
Federal election (2025): Oberhavel – Havelland II
Notes:	Blue background denotes the winner of the electorate vote. Pink background denotes a candidate elected from their party list. Yellow background denotes an electorate win by a list member, or other incumbent. A ✓ or ✗ denotes status of any incumbent, win or lose respectively.						
Party	Candidate	Votes	%	±%	Party votes	%	±%
AfD	Andreas Galau	64,556	30.8	▲14.8	61,545	29.3	▲13.4
CDU	Uwe Feiler	51,984	24.8	▲4.1	45,580	21.7	▲4.4
SPD	✗ Ariane Fäscher	41,822	20.0	▼6.3	32,266	15.4	▼13.2
Left	Annabell Rattmann	19,831	9.5	▲1.4	19,602	9.3	▲2.8
BSW					18,359	8.7	New
Greens	Linda Weiß	13,889	6.6	▼3.2	17,620	8.4	▼2.3
FDP	Ralf Tiedemann	6,039	2.9	▼6.1	7,579	3.6	▼6.6
FW	Stefanie Gebauer	6,804	3.3	▼1.0	2,967	1.4	▼1.2
PARTEI	Corinna Mettler	4,367	2.1	▼0.2	4,367	1.1	▼0.1
Volt					1,444	0.7	▲0.4
BD					406	0.2	New
MLPD					138	0.1	0.0
Informal votes		1,820			1,290		
Total valid votes		209.292			209,822		
Turnout		211,112	83.9	▲5.6			
AfD gain from SPD	Majority	12,572	6.0	N/A			

=== 2021 election ===
Federal election (2021): Oberhavel – Havelland II
Notes:	Blue background denotes the winner of the electorate vote. Pink background denotes a candidate elected from their party list. Yellow background denotes an electorate win by a list member, or other incumbent. A ✓ or ✗ denotes status of any incumbent, win or lose respectively.						
Party	Candidate	Votes	%	±%	Party votes	%	±%
SPD	Ariane Fäscher	50,697	26.3	▲3.6	55,193	28.6	▲10.0
CDU	✗ Uwe Feiler	39,996	20.8	▼9.1	33,378	17.3	▼11.2
AfD	Ulrich Storm	30,863	16.0	▼2.0	30,793	15.9	▼2.7
Greens	Anne Schumacher	19,026	9.9	▲4.6	20,663	10.7	▲4.3
FDP	Ralf Tiedemann	17,322	9.0	▲3.8	19,802	10.3	▲2.6
Left	Anke Domscheit-Berg	15,501	8.0	▼6.7	12,665	6.6	▼7.7
Tierschutzpartei					6,154	3.2	▲1.2
FW	Stefanie Gebauer	8,282	4.3	▲2.8	5,142	2.7	▲1.7
PARTEI	Rick Grothe	4,330	2.2	▲0.4	2,360	1.2	▼0.1
dieBasis	Sven Lingreen	3,502	1.8		2,732	1.4	
Pirates	Thomas Ney	2,267	1.2	▲0.5	1,076	0.6	
Unabhängige					761	0.4	
NPD					555	0.3	▼0.5
Volt					504	0.3	
Team Todenhöfer					472	0.2	
ÖDP	Nathanael Uhlig	952	0.5		373	0.2	0.0
Humanists					244	0.1	
DKP					145	0.1	0.0
MLPD					77	0.0	0.0
Informal votes		2,470			2,120		
Total valid votes		192,738			193,088		
Turnout		195,208	78.3	▲2.2			
SPD gain from CDU	Majority	10,701	5.5				

=== 2017 election ===
Federal election (2017): Oberhavel – Havelland II
Notes:	Blue background denotes the winner of the electorate vote. Pink background denotes a candidate elected from their party list. Yellow background denotes an electorate win by a list member, or other incumbent. A ✓ or ✗ denotes status of any incumbent, win or lose respectively.						
Party	Candidate	Votes	%	±%	Party votes	%	±%
CDU	✓ Uwe Feiler	54,455	29.9	▼7.9	51,968	28.5	▼8.0
SPD	Benjamin Grimm	41,423	22.7	▼5.2	33,856	18.5	▼5.1
AfD	Christian Schmidt	32,762	18.0		33,987	18.6	▲11.9
Left	Harald Petzold	26,839	14.7	▼4.7	26,091	14.3	▼3.9
Greens	Petra Budke	9,685	5.3	▲0.3	11,684	6.4	▲0.7
FDP	Volkmar Richter	9,514	5.2	▲3.7	13,912	7.6	▲4.6
Tierschutzpartei					3,703	2.0	
PARTEI	Stefan Reckin	3,351	1.8		2,415	1.3	
FW	Heinz Ließke	2,684	1.5	0.0	1,770	1.0	▲0.1
NPD					1,476	0.8	▼1.6
Pirates	Thomas Ney	1,174	0.6	▼2.4			
BGE					613	0.3	
DM					519	0.3	
ÖDP					299	0.2	
DKP		403	0.2	0.0	217	0.1	
MLPD					100	0.1	0.0
Informal votes		2,722			2,402		
Total valid votes		182,290			182,610		
Turnout		185,012	76.1	▲4.7			
CDU hold	Majority	13,032	7.2	▼2.3			

=== 2013 election ===
Federal election (2013): Oberhavel – Havelland II
Notes:	Blue background denotes the winner of the electorate vote. Pink background denotes a candidate elected from their party list. Yellow background denotes an electorate win by a list member, or other incumbent. A ✓ or ✗ denotes status of any incumbent, win or lose respectively.						
Party	Candidate	Votes	%	±%	Party votes	%	±%
CDU	Uwe Feiler	65,081	37.5	▲9.8	63,199	36.2	▲11.4
SPD	✗ Angelika Krüger-Leißner	48,668	28.0	▼1.2	41,603	23.8	▼1.8
Left	Harald Petzold	34,046	19.6	▼4.6	32,023	18.3	▼4.9
AfD					11,713	6.7	
Greens	Maria Heider	8,510	4.9	▼2.4	9,861	5.7	▼2.1
NPD	Detlef Appel	5,880	3.4	▲0.1	4,273	2.4	0.0
Pirates	Anke Domscheit-Berg	5,281	3.0		3,894	2.2	▼0.1
FDP	Georg Neubauer	2,571	1.5	▼6.3	5,119	2.9	▼8.5
FW	Peter Heck	2,481	1.4		1,577	0.9	
Independent	Erhard Peschel	895	0.5				
PRO					787	0.5	
DKP					306	0.2	
REP					304	0.2	▼0.1
MLPD					168	0.1	0.0
Informal votes		3,659			2,857		
Total valid votes		173,719			174,521		
Turnout		177,378	70.8	▲2.1			
CDU gain from SPD	Majority	16,413	9.5				

=== 2009 election ===
Federal election (2009): Oberhavel – Havelland II
Notes:	Blue background denotes the winner of the electorate vote. Pink background denotes a candidate elected from their party list. Yellow background denotes an electorate win by a list member, or other incumbent. A ✓ or ✗ denotes status of any incumbent, win or lose respectively.						
Party	Candidate	Votes	%	±%	Party votes	%	±%
SPD	✓ Angelika Krüger-Leißner	48,621	29.2	▼12.8	42,959	25.7	▼10.5
CDU	Uwe Feiler	46,088	27.7	▲1.2	41,575	24.8	▲2.8
Left	Harald Petzold	40,334	24.2	▲2.3	38,980	23.3	▲1.3
FDP	Horst-Peter Stein	12,963	7.8	▲3.6	19,163	11.5	▲3.5
Greens	Dietmar Strehl	12,193	7.3		12,974	7.8	▲1.2
NPD	Lore Lierse	5,400	3.2	0.0	4,153	2.5	▼0.7
Pirates					3,891	2.3	
DVU					1,305	0.8	
FWD					1,299	0.8	
REP					478	0.3	
BüSo					377	0.2	
MLPD					181	0.1	▼0.1
Informal votes		4,907			4,179		
Total valid votes		166,607			167,335		
Turnout		171,514	68.6	▼8.1			
SPD hold	Majority	2,533	1.5				

=== 2005 election ===
Federal election (2005):Oberhavel – Havelland II
Notes:	Blue background denotes the winner of the electorate vote. Pink background denotes a candidate elected from their party list. Yellow background denotes an electorate win by a list member, or other incumbent. A ✓ or ✗ denotes status of any incumbent, win or lose respectively.						
Party	Candidate	Votes	%	±%	Party votes	%	±%
SPD	✓ Angelika Krüger-Leißner	76,005	41.9	▼3.0	65,617	36.1	▼8.9
CDU	Barbara Richstein	47,977	26.5	▲2.1	40,007	22.0	▼1.4
Left	Philipp Becker	39,751	21.9	▲4.1	40,008	22.0	▲7.8
FDP	Hans Oberlack	7,567	4.2	▼1.8	14,446	8.0	▲1.5
Greens					11,868	6.5	▲0.5
NPD	Bernd Schröer	5,797	3.2	▲0.5	5,828	3.2	▲1.2
Familie	Knut Leitert	4,120	2.3	▲2.3			
GRAUEN					2,123	1.2	▲0.5
50Plus The Generation-Alliance					1,386	0.8	
MLPD					332	0.2	
Informal votes		3,439			3,041		
Total valid votes		181,217			181,615		
Turnout		184,656	76.7	▲1.7			
SPD hold	Majority	28,028	15.4				
