= Brandenburg an der Havel – Potsdam-Mittelmark I – Havelland III – Teltow-Fläming I =

Federal electoral district of Germany

60 Brandenburg an der Havel – Potsdam-Mittelmark I – Havelland III – Teltow-Fläming I
- Electoral district for the Bundestag
- Brandenburg an der Havel – Potsdam-Mittelmark I – Havelland III – Teltow-Fläming I in 2025
- State: Brandenburg
- Population: 248,700 (2019)
- Electorate: 202,955 (2021)
- Major settlements: Brandenburg an der Havel; Werder (Havel); Rathenow
- Area: 3,266.7 km^{2}

Current electoral district
- Created: 1990
- Party: AfD
- Member: Arne Raue
- Elected: 2025

Brandenburg an der Havel – Potsdam-Mittelmark I – Havelland III – Teltow-Fläming I is an electoral constituency (German: Wahlkreis) represented in the Bundestag. It elects one member via first-past-the-post voting. Under the current constituency numbering system, it is designated as constituency 60. It is located in western Brandenburg, comprising the city of Brandenburg an der Havel, most of the Potsdam-Mittelmark district, and parts of the Havelland and Teltow-Fläming districts.

Brandenburg an der Havel – Potsdam-Mittelmark I – Havelland III – Teltow-Fläming I was created for the inaugural 1990 federal election after German reunification. From 2021 to 2025, it was represented by Sonja Eichwede of the Social Democratic Party (SPD). Since 2025 it has been represented by Arne Raue of the AfD.

== Geography ==
Brandenburg an der Havel – Potsdam-Mittelmark I – Havelland III – Teltow-Fläming I is located in western Brandenburg. As of the 2021 federal election, it comprises the independent city of Brandenburg an der Havel; the entirety of the Potsdam-Mittelmark district excluding the municipalities of Kleinmachnow, Michendorf, Nuthetal, Schwielowsee, Stahnsdorf, and Teltow; the municipalities of Milower Land, Premnitz, and Rathenow from the Havelland district; and the municipalities of Jüterbog and Niedergörsdorf from the Teltow-Fläming district.

== History ==
Brandenburg an der Havel – Potsdam-Mittelmark I – Havelland III – Teltow-Fläming I was created after German reunification in 1990, then known as Brandenburg a.d. Havel – Rathenow – Belzig. It acquired its current name in the 2002 election. In the 1990 through 1998 elections, it was constituency 275 in the numbering system. In the 2002 and 2005 elections, it was number 60. In the 2009 election, it was number 61. Since the 2013 election, it has been number 60.

Originally, the constituency comprised the independent city of Brandenburg an der Havel and the districts of Rathenow and Belzig. It acquired its current configuration in the 2002 election. Upon the abolition of the Groß Kreutz Amt ahead of the 2005 election, the former municipality of Derwitz was transferred out of the constituency. In the 2017 election, it lost the Amt of Nennhausen. In the 2021 election, it gained the municipality of Werder (Havel).

Election	No.	Name	Borders
1990	275	Brandenburg a.d. Havel – Rathenow – Belzig	Brandenburg an der Havel city; Rathenow district; Belzig district
1994	275	Brandenburg a.d. Havel – Rathenow – Belzig	Brandenburg an der Havel city; Rathenow district; Belzig district
1998	275	Brandenburg a.d. Havel – Rathenow – Belzig	Brandenburg an der Havel city; Rathenow district; Belzig district
2002	60	Brandenburg an der Havel – Potsdam-Mittelmark I – Havelland III – Teltow-Fläming I	Brandenburg an der Havel city; Potsdam-Mittelmark district (excluding Kleinmachnow, Michendorf, Nuthetal, Schwielowsee, Stahnsdorf, Teltow, and Werder (Havel) municipalities); Havelland district (only Milower Land, Premnitz, and Rathenow municipalities and Nennhausen Amt); Teltow-Fläming district (only Jüterbog and Niedergörsdorf municipalities)
2005	60	Brandenburg an der Havel – Potsdam-Mittelmark I – Havelland III – Teltow-Fläming I	Brandenburg an der Havel city; Potsdam-Mittelmark district (excluding Kleinmachnow, Michendorf, Nuthetal, Schwielowsee, Stahnsdorf, Teltow, and Werder (Havel) municipalities); Havelland district (only Milower Land, Premnitz, and Rathenow municipalities and Nennhausen Amt); Teltow-Fläming district (only Jüterbog and Niedergörsdorf municipalities)
2009	61	Brandenburg an der Havel – Potsdam-Mittelmark I – Havelland III – Teltow-Fläming I	Brandenburg an der Havel city; Potsdam-Mittelmark district (excluding Kleinmachnow, Michendorf, Nuthetal, Schwielowsee, Stahnsdorf, Teltow, and Werder (Havel) municipalities); Havelland district (only Milower Land, Premnitz, and Rathenow municipalities and Nennhausen Amt); Teltow-Fläming district (only Jüterbog and Niedergörsdorf municipalities)
2013	60	Brandenburg an der Havel – Potsdam-Mittelmark I – Havelland III – Teltow-Fläming I	Brandenburg an der Havel city; Potsdam-Mittelmark district (excluding Kleinmachnow, Michendorf, Nuthetal, Schwielowsee, Stahnsdorf, Teltow, and Werder (Havel) municipalities); Havelland district (only Milower Land, Premnitz, and Rathenow municipalities and Nennhausen Amt); Teltow-Fläming district (only Jüterbog and Niedergörsdorf municipalities)
2017	60	Brandenburg an der Havel – Potsdam-Mittelmark I – Havelland III – Teltow-Fläming I	Brandenburg an der Havel city; Potsdam-Mittelmark district (excluding Kleinmachnow, Michendorf, Nuthetal, Schwielowsee, Stahnsdorf, Teltow, and Werder (Havel) municipalities); Havelland district (only Milower Land, Premnitz, and Rathenow municipalities); Teltow-Fläming district (only Jüterbog and Niedergörsdorf municipalities)
2021	60	Brandenburg an der Havel – Potsdam-Mittelmark I – Havelland III – Teltow-Fläming I	Brandenburg an der Havel city; Potsdam-Mittelmark district (excluding Kleinmachnow, Michendorf, Nuthetal, Schwielowsee, Stahnsdorf, and Teltow municipalities); Havelland district (only Milower Land, Premnitz, and Rathenow municipalities); Teltow-Fläming district (only Jüterbog and Niedergörsdorf municipalities)
2025	60	Brandenburg an der Havel – Potsdam-Mittelmark I – Havelland III – Teltow-Fläming I	Brandenburg an der Havel city; Potsdam-Mittelmark district (excluding Kleinmachnow, Michendorf, Nuthetal, Schwielowsee, Stahnsdorf, and Teltow municipalities); Havelland district (only Milower Land, Premnitz, and Rathenow municipalities); Teltow-Fläming district (only Jüterbog and Niedergörsdorf municipalities)

== Members ==
The constituency was first represented by Hans-Hinrich Knaape of the Social Democratic Party (SPD) from 1990 to 1998, followed by Margrit Spielmann from 1998 to 2009. Future President of Germany Frank-Walter Steinmeier served from 2009 to 2017. In 2017, Dietlind Tiemann of the Christian Democratic Union (CDU) was elected as representative. Sonja Eichwede regained the constituency for the SPD in 2021. In 2025 Arne Raue won the constituency for the AFD.

Election	Member	Party	%
1990	Hans-Hinrich Knaape	SPD	38.5
1994	Hans-Hinrich Knaape	SPD	50.1
1998	Margrit Spielmann	SPD	48.6
2002	Margrit Spielmann	SPD	46.4
2005	Margrit Spielmann	SPD	41.2
2009	Frank-Walter Steinmeier	SPD	32.8
2013	Frank-Walter Steinmeier	SPD	33.1
2017	Dietlind Tiemann	CDU	31.8
2021	Sonja Eichwede	SPD	32.1
2025	Arne Raue	AfD	33.6

== Election results ==
=== 2025 election ===
Federal election (2025): Brandenburg an der Havel – Potsdam-Mittelmark I – Havelland III – Teltow-Fläming I
Notes:	Blue background denotes the winner of the electorate vote. Pink background denotes a candidate elected from their party list. Yellow background denotes an electorate win by a list member, or other incumbent. A ✓ or ✗ denotes status of any incumbent, win or lose respectively.						
Party	Candidate	Votes	%	±%	Party votes	%	±%
AfD	Arne Raue	54,605	33.6	▲17.2	50,225	31.4	▲15.0
SPD	✗ Sonja Eichwede	41,053	25.8	▼6.3	27,515	17.2	▼16.1
CDU	Saskia Ludwig	30,943	19.4	▼0.7	29,337	18.3	▲3.0
Left	Christin Willnat	17,348	10.9	▲2.2	17,229	10.8	▲2.5
BSW					16,244	10.2	New
Greens	Sylvana Specht	5,957	3.7	▼2.8	9,603	6.0	▼2.4
FW	Dave-Alexander Korte	4,795	3.0	▼0.8	2,320	1.5	▼1.2
FDP	Matti Karstedt	3,718	2.3	▼4.0	4,627	2.9	▼5.3
PARTEI					1,224	0.8	▼0.4
Volt	Patrick Achtenberg	1,918	1.2	New	1,122	0.7	▲0.4
BD					351	0.2	New
MLPD					102	0.1	0.0
Informal votes		1,821			1,259		
Total valid votes		160,337			159,899		
Turnout		162,158	80.3	▲7.6			
AfD gain from SPD	Majority	13,552	7.8	N/A			

=== 2021 election ===
Federal election (2021): Brandenburg an der Havel – Potsdam-Mittelmark I – Havelland III – Teltow-Fläming I
Notes:	Blue background denotes the winner of the electorate vote. Pink background denotes a candidate elected from their party list. Yellow background denotes an electorate win by a list member, or other incumbent. A ✓ or ✗ denotes status of any incumbent, win or lose respectively.						
Party	Candidate	Votes	%	±%	Party votes	%	±%
SPD	Sonja Eichwede	46,642	32.1	▲7.2	48,423	33.3	▲12.9
CDU	✗ Dietlind Tiemann	29,236	20.1	▼11.8	22,274	15.3	▼13.1
AfD	Axel Brösicke	23,931	16.5	▼0.2	23,845	16.4	▼1.3
Left	Tobias Bank	12,672	8.7	▼6.2	12,019	8.3	▼8.2
Greens	Alexandra Pichl	9,474	6.5	▲2.9	12,211	8.4	▲3.9
FDP	Patrick Meinhardt	9,266	6.4	▲1.6	11,934	8.2	▲1.5
FW	Michael Müller	5,521	3.8	▲1.8	3,853	2.6	▲1.5
Tierschutzpartei					3,599	2.5	▲0.8
PARTEI	Isabell Knauff	2,525	1.7	▲1.6	1,716	1.2	▲0.1
dieBasis	Guido Esser	2,305	1.6		2,173	1.5	
Unabhängige	Thomas Rödiger	1,133	0.8		1,035	0.7	
Independent	Corinna Conrad	955	0.7				
Pirates	Mathias Täge	840	0.6	0.0	626	0.4	
Independent	Klaas Hinners	478	0.3				
NPD					459	0.3	▼0.5
Volt					419	0.3	
Team Todenhöfer					290	0.2	
ÖDP	Martina Schallert	401	0.3		270	0.2	0.0
Humanists					184	0.1	
DKP					167	0.1	▼0.1
MLPD					82	0.1	0.0
Informal votes		2,239			2,039		
Total valid votes		145,379			145,579		
Turnout		147,618	72.7	▲2.2			
SPD gain from CDU	Majority	17,406	12.0				

=== 2017 election ===
Federal election (2017): Brandenburg an der Havel – Potsdam-Mittelmark I – Havelland III – Teltow-Fläming I
Notes:	Blue background denotes the winner of the electorate vote. Pink background denotes a candidate elected from their party list. Yellow background denotes an electorate win by a list member, or other incumbent. A ✓ or ✗ denotes status of any incumbent, win or lose respectively.						
Party	Candidate	Votes	%	±%	Party votes	%	±%
CDU	Dietlind Tiemann	39,991	31.8	▼1.1	35,556	28.2	▼5.9
SPD	Erardo Rautenberg	31,548	25.1	▼8.2	26,055	20.7	▼5.6
AfD	Klaus-Dieter Riedelsdorf	21,312	16.9		22,633	17.9	▲13.1
Left	Anke Domscheit-Berg	19,038	15.1	▼8.6	20,925	16.6	▼6.3
FDP	Eric Vohn	5,763	4.6	▲3.0	8,194	6.5	▲4.2
Greens	Till Heyer-Stuffer	4,293	3.4	▲1.0	5,238	4.2	▲0.4
FW	Bettina Sommerlatte-Hennig	2,559	2.0		1,520	1.2	▲0.4
Tierschutzpartei					2,103	1.7	
PARTEI					1,337	1.1	
NPD					1,132	0.9	▼1.7
Pirates	Mathias Täge	728	0.6	▼1.9			
DKP	Werner Becker	566	0.4		239	0.2	
BGE					514	0.4	
DM					429	0.3	
ÖDP					192	0.2	
MLPD					78	0.1	0.0
Informal votes		2,260			1,913		
Total valid votes		125,798			126,145		
Turnout		128,058	69.9	▲5.0			
CDU gain from SPD	Majority	8,443	6.7				

=== 2013 election ===
Federal election (2013): Brandenburg an der Havel – Potsdam-Mittelmark I – Havelland III – Teltow-Fläming I
Notes:	Blue background denotes the winner of the electorate vote. Pink background denotes a candidate elected from their party list. Yellow background denotes an electorate win by a list member, or other incumbent. A ✓ or ✗ denotes status of any incumbent, win or lose respectively.						
Party	Candidate	Votes	%	±%	Party votes	%	±%
SPD	✓ Frank-Walter Steinmeier	40,306	33.1	▲0.3	32,002	26.2	▼1.4
CDU	Andrea Voßhoff	39,973	32.8	▲8.2	41,489	34.0	▲10.1
Left	Diana Golze	28,974	23.8	▼4.7	27,921	22.9	▼5.7
AfD					5,929	4.9	
NPD	Maik Schneider	3,968	3.3	▲0.2	3,187	2.6	▲0.2
Pirates	Frank Steinert	3,038	2.5		2,388	2.0	▼0.5
Greens	Yvonne Plaul	2,952	2.4	▼1.4	4,578	3.8	▼1.1
FDP	Max Koziolek	1,911	1.6	▼4.3	2,780	2.3	▼5.7
FW					933	0.8	
Independent	Thomas Rödiger	620	0.5				
PRO					450	0.4	
REP					183	0.2	0.0
MLPD					131	0.1	0.0
Informal votes		2,434			2,205		
Total valid votes		121,742			121,971		
Turnout		124,176	65.0	▲0.6			
SPD hold	Majority	333	0.3	▼4.1			

=== 2009 election ===
Federal election (2009): Brandenburg an der Havel – Potsdam-Mittelmark I – Havelland III – Teltow-Fläming I
Notes:	Blue background denotes the winner of the electorate vote. Pink background denotes a candidate elected from their party list. Yellow background denotes an electorate win by a list member, or other incumbent. A ✓ or ✗ denotes status of any incumbent, win or lose respectively.						
Party	Candidate	Votes	%	±%	Party votes	%	±%
SPD	Frank-Walter Steinmeier	40,957	32.9	▼8.4	34,451	27.7	▼9.9
Left	Diana Golze	35,484	28.5	▲2.1	35,643	28.6	▲2.1
CDU	Andrea Voßhoff	30,733	24.7	▲2.2	29,834	24.0	▲3.8
FDP	Heinz Lanfermann	7,328	5.9	▲1.7	9,992	8.0	▲1.4
Greens	Joachim Gessinger	4,771	3.8	▲1.0	6,047	4.9	▲0.4
NPD	Dieter Manfred Brose	3,764	3.0	▲0.1	3,013	2.4	▼0.5
Pirates					3,093	2.5	
DVU					1,163	0.9	
Independent	Lothar Sommer	862	0.7				
FWD					807	0.6	
Independent	Hans-Jürgen Rettig	776	0.6				
BüSo					199	0.2	
REP					172	0.1	
MLPD					151	0.1	▼0.1
Informal votes		3,598			3,708		
Total valid votes		124,675			124,565		
Turnout		128,273	64.4	▼7.9			
SPD hold	Majority	5,473	4.4	▼10.5			

=== 2005 election ===
Federal election (2005):Brandenburg an der Havel – Potsdam-Mittelmark I – Havelland III – Teltow-Fläming I
Notes:	Blue background denotes the winner of the electorate vote. Pink background denotes a candidate elected from their party list. Yellow background denotes an electorate win by a list member, or other incumbent. A ✓ or ✗ denotes status of any incumbent, win or lose respectively.						
Party	Candidate	Votes	%	±%	Party votes	%	±%
SPD	✓ Margrit Spielmann	59,304	41.2	▼4.2	54,128	37.6	▼10.4
Left	Diana Golze	37,881	26.3	▲7.6	38,172	26.5	▲10.1
CDU	Andrea Voßhoff	32,329	22.5	▼0.9	29,083	20.2	▼2.1
FDP	Christian Griebel	6,029	4.2	▼4.1	9,494	6.6	▲0.7
NPD	Dieter Woche	4,261	3.0		4,224	2.9	▲1.5
Greens	Martin Köhler	4,063	2.8	▼0.4	6,442	4.5	▲0.4
GRAUEN					1,371	1.0	▲0.4
50Plus The Generation-Alliance					813	0.6	
MLPD					340	0.2	
Informal votes		3,139			2,939		
Total valid votes		143,867			144,067		
Turnout		147,006	72.3	▲1.4			
SPD hold	Majority	21,423	14.9				
