= Morvalden Angerstoff Taylor =

American politician (1830–1925)

Morvalden Angerstoff Taylor (April 13, 1830 – May 31, 1925) was an American businessman and politician.

Taylor was born in Roxbury, Oxford County, Maine. He moved to Minnesota in 1855 and eventually settled in Melrose, Stearns County, Minnesota with his wife and family. He was a farmer and land surveyor. Taylor also served as the postmaster for Melrose, Minnesota. He served in the Minnesota House of Representatives in 1875.
