= Forum am Wall =

Building in Bremen, Germany

Coordinates: 53°4′25″N 8°48′45″E

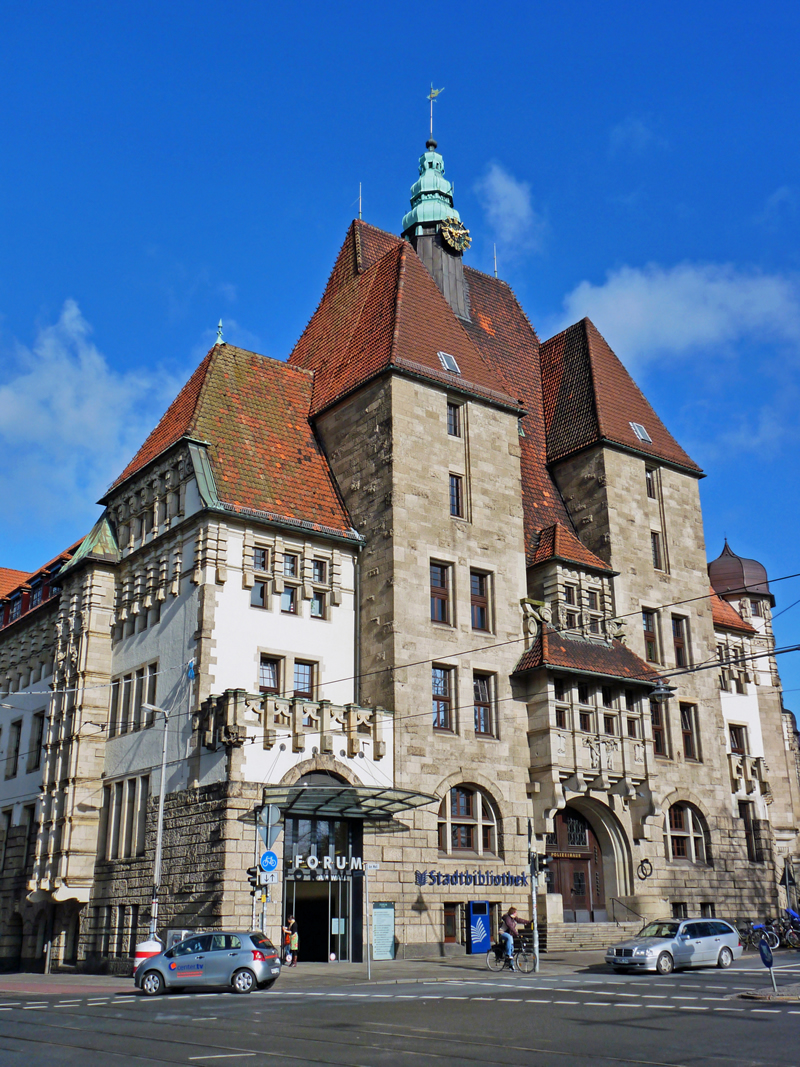
Forum am Wall

The Forum am Wall building in Bremen, Germany, dates from 1908 when it was constructed in the Neo-Renaissance style as the municipal police headquarters (Polizeihaus). While the building still houses a small police station, it is now home to the city's central library. In addition to a restaurant and some small cafés, the building is also a venue for concerts and exhibitions.

== History and architecture ==
The building located at No. 201, Am Wall, was designed by Carl Börnstein. Completed in 1908, it was built in connection with the relocation of administrative offices after the Stadthaus had been demolished to make room for the New Town Hall. As premises for the State Archives and the registrar's office were needed in addition to those for the police headquarters, it was logical that the site should be close to the Courthouse. In the interests of making maximum use of the available space, the complex takes the form of a trapezium enclosed by two wings. The inner courtyard is divided into three smaller sections. In line with the architecture parlante approach, the extensive rusticated socle and mezzanine storey are evocative of a town gate flanked by towers and round-arched portals. The tall gables and the bays protruding from the rendered façade are features of more modern administrative architecture. Most of the building's Neo-Renaissance decorations were removed after the war, giving the building a more martial appearance and enhancing its authenticity.

== Today's building ==
In 2004, work on renovation and refurbishment of the former police headquarters was completed, providing some 8,000 m^{2} (86,000 sq ft) of space for the city's central library. Other tenants include snack bars, cafés and a restaurant. In parts of the building is the inner city police station of Bremen police.

== Literature ==
- Polizei Bremen (1999). Das Bremer Polizeihaus: die Architektur, das Amt, die Menschen. Aschenbeck und Holstein. ISBN 978-3-932292-19-4.
