= Christin Willnat =

Member of the Bundestag from Brandenburg
- Incumbent
- Assumed office 2025

Personal details
- Born: 3 April 1986 (age 40) Brandenburg an der Havel
- Party: Die Linke
- Education: University of Potsdam

Christin Willnat (born 3 April 1986) is a German politician from Die Linke. She was elected to the Bundestag in the 2025 German federal election.

== Life ==
Christin Willnat was born in 1986, the daughter of a saleswoman and a tram driver in Brandenburg an der Havel. After 10th grade, Willnat began an apprenticeship as a retail clerk and was fired in the third year of her apprenticeship. She was unemployed for a year and a half before she was able to obtain her vocational qualification. She later also obtained her Abitur (university entrance qualification). She then studied Interdisciplinary Russian Studies at the University of Potsdam. Christin Willnat is the mother of four children and lives in Brandenburg an der Havel. Willnat works as an integration assistant and translator.

=== Political career ===
In 2019, Willnat joined the Left Party. Within the party, she became party chairwoman of Brandenburg an der Havel in 2019. There, she campaigned for better education and local transport in Brandenburg an der Havel. In November 2024, she was elected with 100% of the vote to one of the two district executives of the Left Party in Brandenburg an der Havel. In December 2024, she was chosen as a direct candidate for the Left Party in Brandenburg an der Havel – Potsdam-Mittelmark I – Havelland III – Teltow-Fläming I. In the federal election of February 2025, Willnat was elected to the Bundestag via the Brandenburg state list.
