= Karl-Heinz Schröter =

German politician (born 1954)

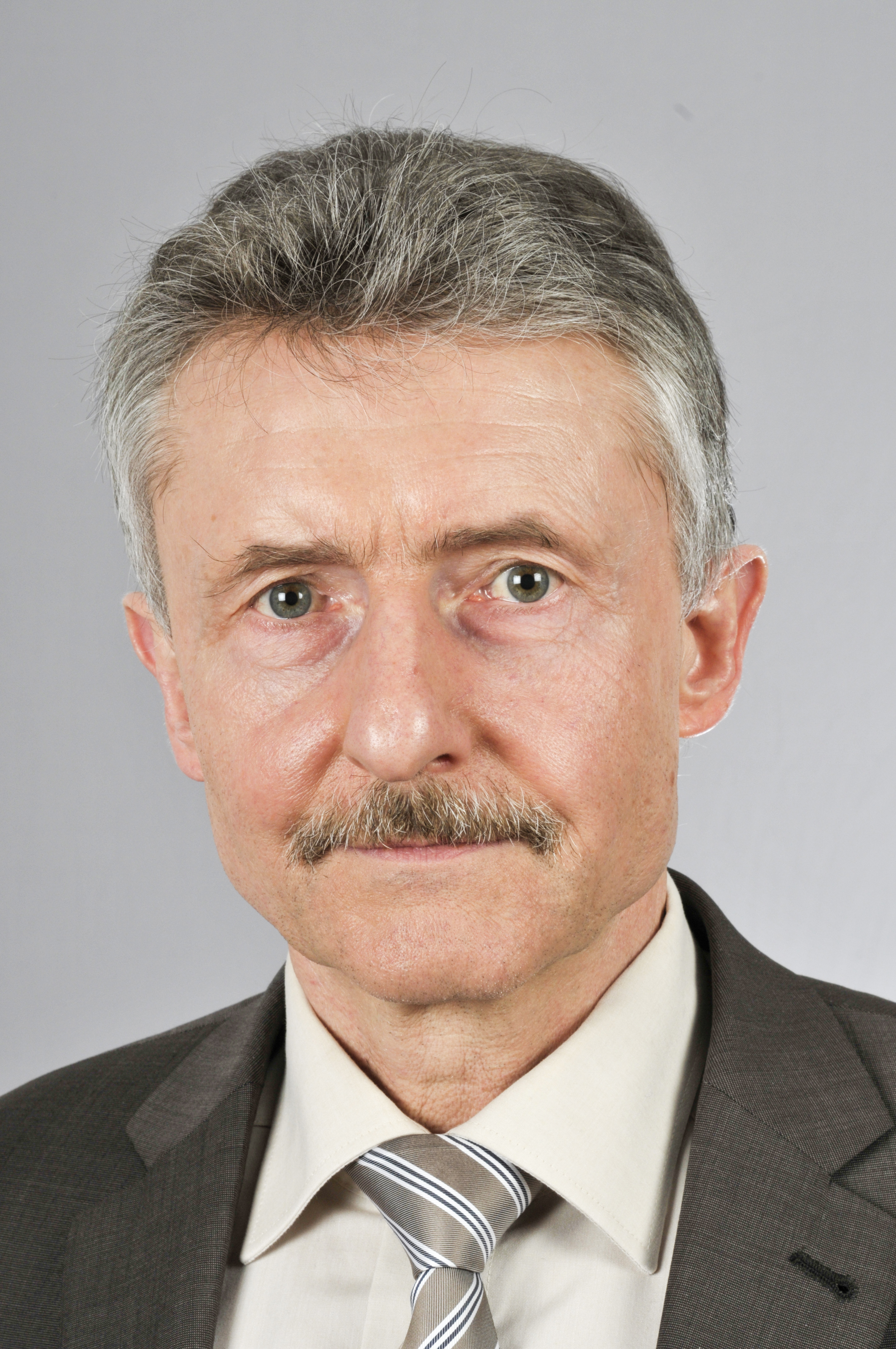
- Schröter in 2016

Minister for the Interior and Communities of Brandenburg
- In office 5 November 2014 – 20 November 2019
- Minister-President: Dietmar Woidke
- Preceded by: Ralf Holzschuher
- Succeeded by: Michael Stübgen

Member of the Bundestag; for Oranienburg – Nauen
- In office 20 December 1990 – 10 November 1994
- Preceded by: Constituency established
- Succeeded by: Wolfgang Ilte

Personal details
- Born: 26 October 1954 (age 71) Frankfurt (Oder), East Germany
- Party: Social Democratic
- Other political affiliations: SDP in the GDR (1989–1990)
- Children: 2
- Education: University of Rostock
- Occupation: District administrator

Karl-Heinz Schröter (born 26 October 1954) is a German politician (Social Democratic Party). He is the current State Minister of the Interior government of Minister-President Dietmar Woidke of Brandenburg. He previously served as district administrator of the Oberhavel district (country Brandenburg) and was a member of the twelfth Bundestag.

== Early life and education ==
Karl-Heinz Schroter was born on 26 October 1954 in Frankfurt (Oder). After attending a Polytechnic Secondary School and Advanced High School, he received the 1973 Abitur. Subsequently he served until 1975, his Military service. Schroeter studied at the University of Rostock, and graduated in 1980 as a graduate engineer with a degree in Agricultural Engineering. Then he was up to 1990 working in the maintenance of agricultural engineering, most recently as Technical Director in the Volkseigenes Gut Animal Production Berlin.

== Political career ==
Schröter 1989 was a member of the Social Democratic Party in the GDR, now Social Democratic Party (SPD), and a year later became chairman of the SPD District Association Oranienburg. In May 1990, Schröter was selected as Chief Executive of the Oranienburg circle. From 1990 to 1994 he was also a Member of the Bundestag as a directly elected representative of the constituency Oranienburg - Nauen In 1994, Schröter as Chief Executive of the newly formed County Upper Havel and Chairman of the County Association and Vice-President of Brandenburg county 2001 saw his re-election as district administrator.

In relation to a possible reorganisation of the Federal Territory, Schroeter in 2000 appealed for the creation of a large north-eastern state. This should consist of the counties Berlin, Brandenburg, Mecklenburg-Western Pomerania and Saxony-Anhalt formed with Schwerin as the capital. In 2006 Schroeter was a candidate for the post of chairman of the SPD in Brandenburg, from which Matthias Platzeck withdrew. In 2007 Schröter demanded further decentralization of school policy in Brandenburg education as a key reform. Cities as education providers should also get the personal responsibility for the teachers In connection with the construction of the Berlin Brandenburg International Airport Schröter pleaded in 2008 for keeping open Berlin-Tegel Airport, otherwise, he feared a negative impact on economic development of the Upper Havel.

In November 2009, Schröter was re-elected by the county council as a district administrator. His new eight-year term will begin in March 2010. The parliamentary groups of CDU SPD and FDP previously had an application rejected in the district council, for a change to the Brandenburg Communal Constitution, to choose the new district administrator directly by citizens. Some group members expressed a direct election was too risky for them. Schröter, in 2007, described as completely unnecessary, the direct election of district administrators in Brandenburg.

Since 2014, Schröter has been serving as State Minister of the Interior in the government of Minister-President Dietmar Woidke of Brandenburg. As one of his state's representatives at the Bundesrat, he serves on the Committee on Internal Affairs and the Defense Committee.

== Comments ==
Schröter is criticized by trade-union members for his support for plans in 2012 to provide merchandise-coupons to political refugees instead of money in cash.

== Personal life ==
Schröter is Catholic, married and has two children. He lives in Hohen Neuendorf and is a Marathon runner.
