= Joseph T. Niehaus Sr. =

American politician (1906–1989)

Member of the Minnesota House of Representatives
- In office 1969–1982

Personal details
- Born: February 23, 1906 Near Melrose, Minnesota
- Died: August 8, 1989 (aged 83) Sauk Centre, Minnesota
- Party: Republican
- Education: University of Minnesota
- Profession: Farmer, businessman, politician

Joseph T. Niehaus Sr. (February 23, 1906 – August 8, 1989) was an American farmer, businessman, and politician.

Niehaus was born on a farm near Melrose, Minnesota, and went to high school. Niehaus took agricultural courses in vocational school and went to the University of Minnesota. He was a farmer and lived in Sauk Centre, Minnesota, with his wife and family.

Niehaus was also involved with the rural telephone company and the Sauk Centre Creamery, and was also a beekeeper and produced honey. He served in the Minnesota House of Representatives from 1969 to 1982 and was a Republican. He died at St. Michael's Hospital in Sauk Centre, Minnesota.
