= Milower Land =

Municipality in Brandenburg, Germany

- Municipality
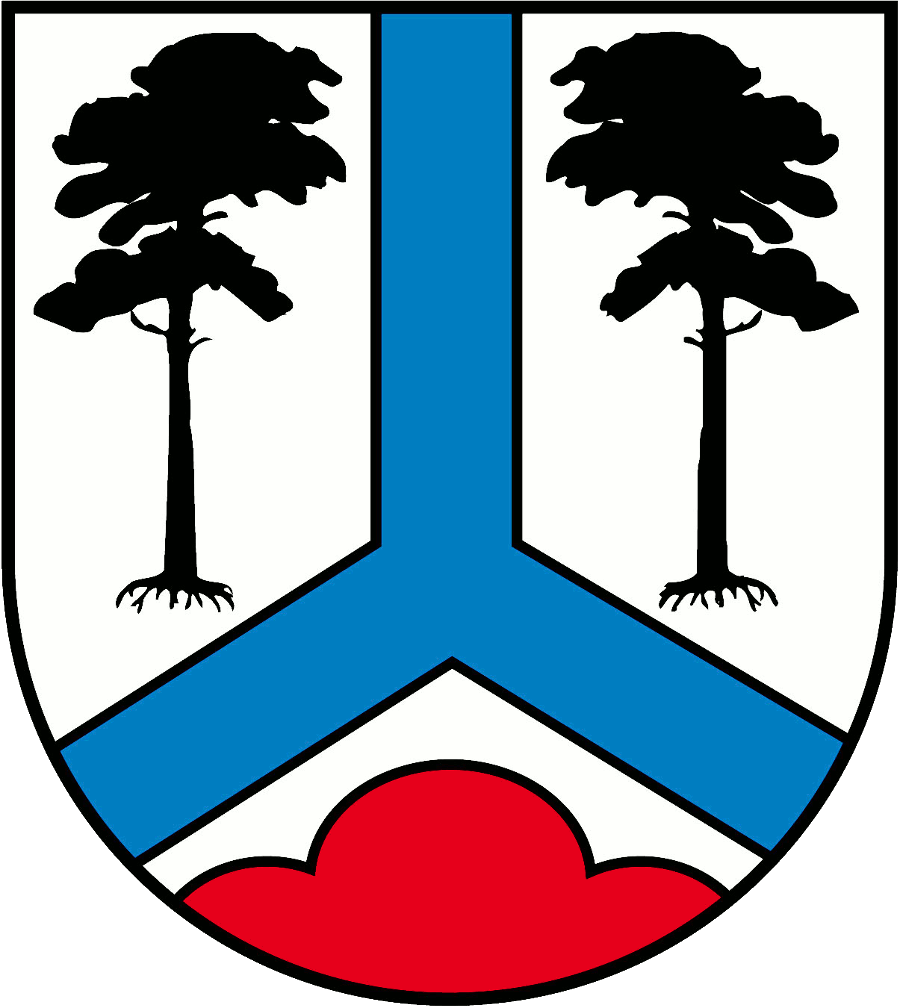
- Coat of arms

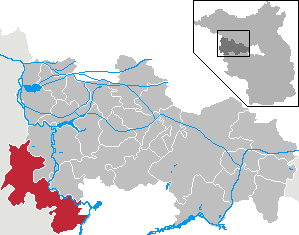
- Location of Milower Land within Havelland district
- Interactive map of Milower Land
- Location within Germany Location within Brandenburg
- Coordinates: 52°31′59″N 12°19′00″E
- Country: Germany
- State: Brandenburg
- District: Havelland
- Subdivisions: 17 Ortsteile

Government
  - Mayor (2019–27): Felix Menzel (SPD)

Area
  - Total: 160.48 km^{2} (61.96 sq mi)
- Elevation: 30 m (98 ft)

Population (2025-12-31)
  - Total: 4,208
  - Density: 26.22/km^{2} (67.91/sq mi)
- Time zone: UTC+01:00 (CET)
  - Summer (DST): UTC+02:00 (CEST)
- Postal codes: 14715
- Dialling codes: 03386, 033870, 033873, 033877
- Vehicle registration: HVL
- Website: www.milow.de

Milower Land (German pronunciation: [ˈmiːloːɐ̯ ˈlant]) is a municipality in the Havelland district, in Brandenburg, Germany.

== Demography ==
Development of Population since 1875 within the Current Boundaries (Blue Line: Population; Dotted Line: Comparison to Population Development of Brandenburg state; Grey Background: Time of Nazi rule; Red Background: Time of Communist rule)

Recent Population Development and Projections (Population Development before Census 2011 (blue line); Recent Population Development according to the Census in Germany in 2011 (blue bordered line); Official projections for 2005-2030 (yellow line); for 2017-2030 (scarlet line); for 2020-2030 (green line)

Milower Land: Population development
within the current boundaries (2020)

Year	Pop.	±% p.a.
1875	5,042	—
1890	5,089	+0.06%
1910	6,184	+0.98%
1925	6,550	+0.38%
1939	6,464	−0.09%
1950	8,448	+2.46%
1964	6,501	−1.85%

Year	Pop.	±% p.a.
1971	6,279	−0.50%
1981	5,343	−1.60%
1985	5,312	−0.15%
1990	5,056	−0.98%
1995	4,854	−0.81%
2000	5,068	+0.87%
2005	4,938	−0.52%

Year	Pop.	±% p.a.
2010	4,601	−1.40%
2015	4,333	−1.19%
2016	4,340	+0.16%
2017	4,287	−1.22%
2018	4,317	+0.70%
2019	4,322	+0.12%
2020	4,364	+0.97%
