= Uwe Feiler =

German politician (born 1965)

Uwe Feiler MdB
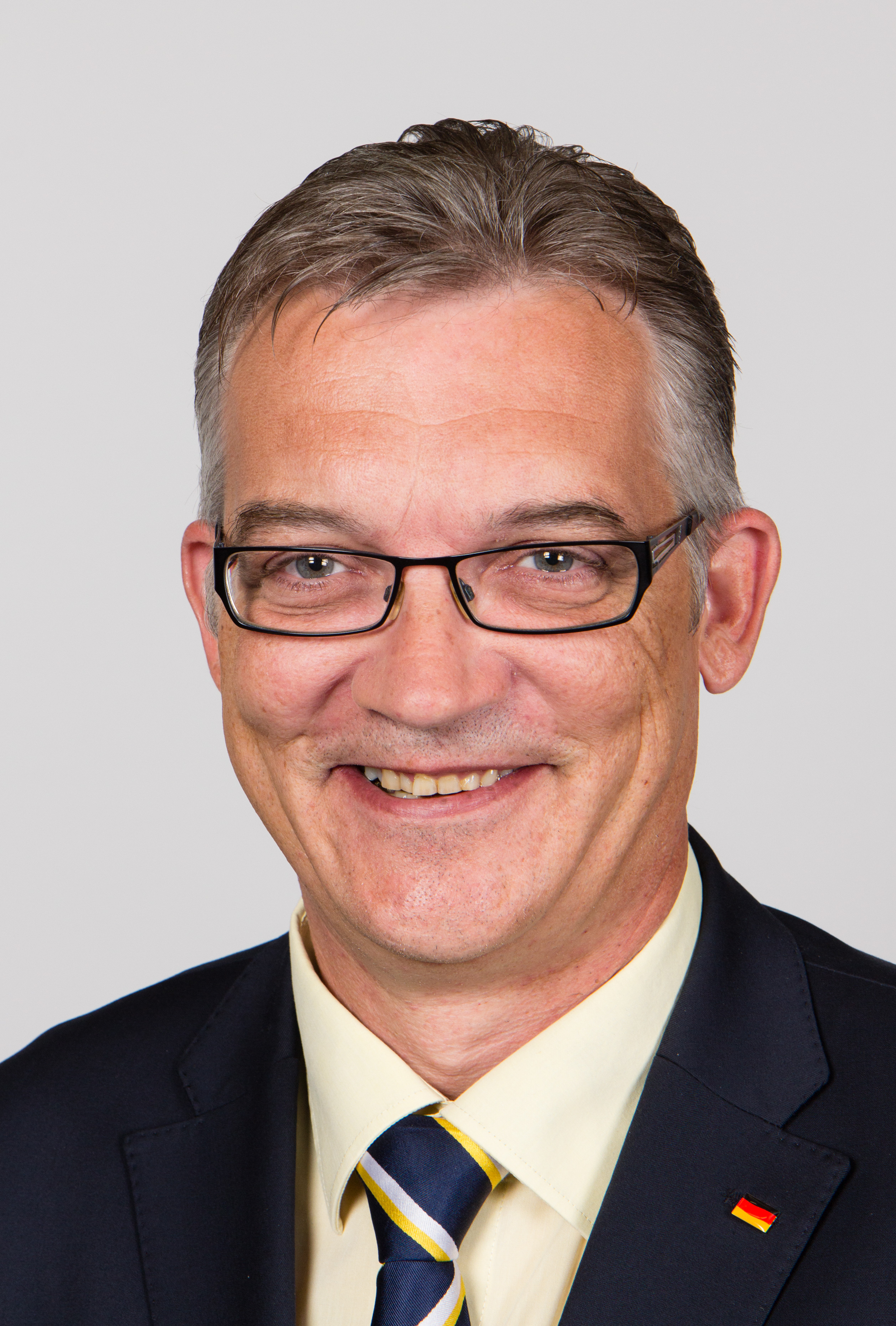
- Feiler in 2014

Member of the Bundestag; from Brandenburg
- Incumbent
- Assumed office 22 October 2013
- Preceded by: Angelika Krüger-Leißner
- Constituency: Oberhavel – Havelland II (2013–2021); State list (2025–present)

Personal details
- Born: 2 November 1965 (age 60) Luhdorf, West Germany
- Party: Christian Democratic Union
- Children: 3

Uwe Feiler (born 2 November 1965) is a German politician of the Christian Democratic Union (CDU) who has been serving as a member of the Bundestag from the state of Brandenburg since 2013. From 2019 to 2021 he was a Parliamentary State Secretary at the Federal Ministry of Food and Agriculture in the government of Chancellor Angela Merkel.

== Political career ==
Feiler first became a member of the Bundestag after the 2009 German federal election, representing the Oberhavel – Havelland II district. From 2014 until 2017, he served on the Finance Committee and the Committee on European Affairs. In 2019, he became Parliamentary State Secretary for Food and Agriculture, under minister Julia Klöckner.

In addition to his committee assignments, Feiler is part of the German-Polish Parliamentary Friendship Group.

For the 2021 elections, Feiler was elected to lead the CDU campaign in Brandenburg.
