= Christoph Tiemann =

German actor, writer, playwright, audio theatre producer and broadcaster (born 1977)

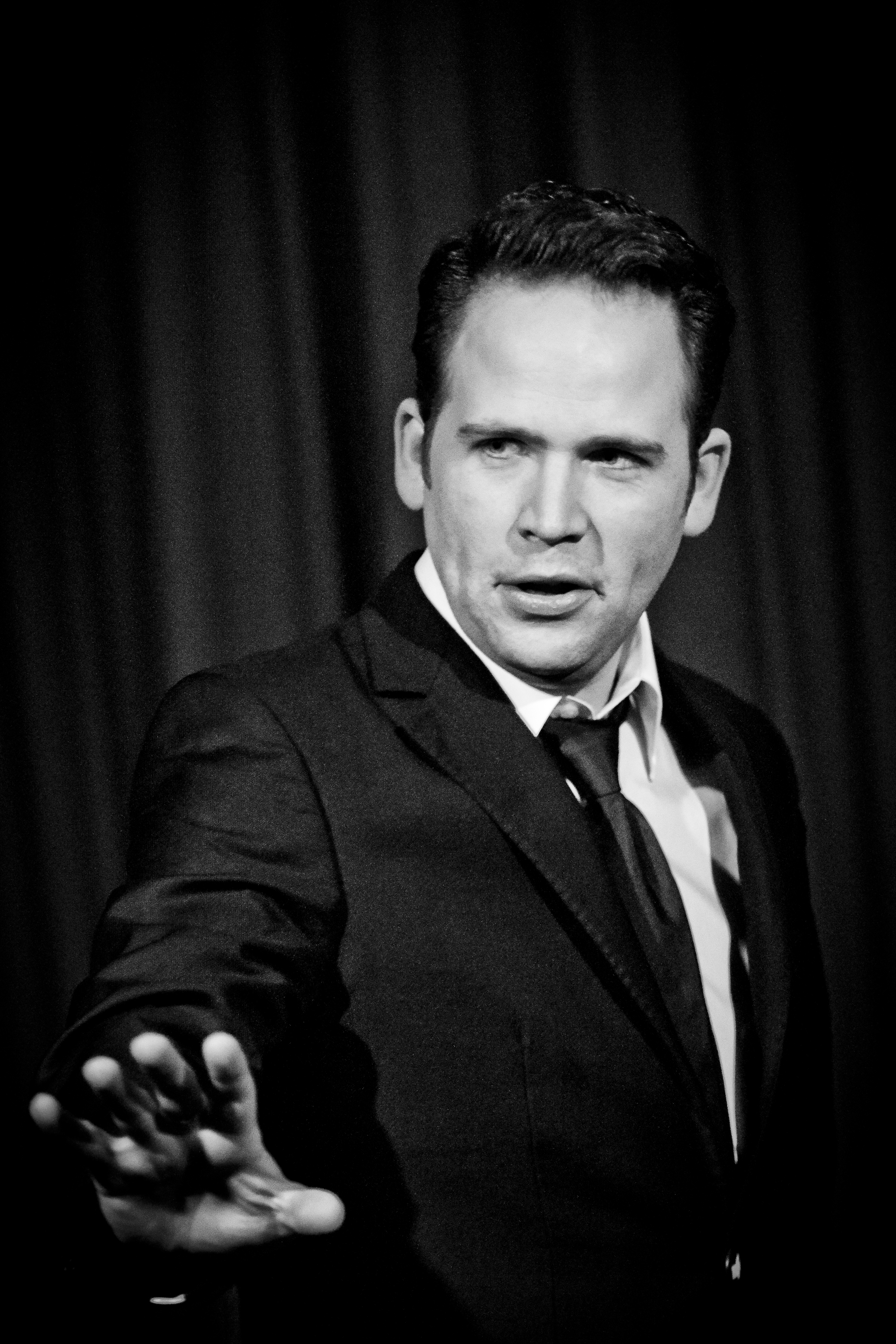
- Tiemann in 2012.
- Born: December 1977 (age 48); Dortmund, West Germany
- Education: University of Münster
- Occupations: Actor, writer, playwright, audio theatre producer and broadcaster
- Years active: 2003–present

Christoph Tiemann (born December 1977) is a German actor, writer, playwright, audio theatre producer and broadcaster. He began his career in radio broadcasting in the late 1990s at the University of Münster and went on to work for WDR as a presenter on several radio programs since 2003. He is also known for his work in audio theatre in a variety of roles, acting and producing several audio plays since the 2000s and forming the ensemble Theater ex libris with their debut in 2010.

== Life and career ==
=== Early life and education ===
Tiemann was born in December 1977 in Dortmund, North Rhine-Westphalia and grew up in Selm to a Protestant family, the son of a civil servant and chemical laboratory technician. He attended Gesamtschule (comprehensive school) in Lünen and later went on to graduate from the University of Münster in 1998, studying psychology and religion. During his studies, he began his broadcast radio career as a presenter for Radio Q, a campus radio station in Münsterland.

=== Early radio and acting career ===
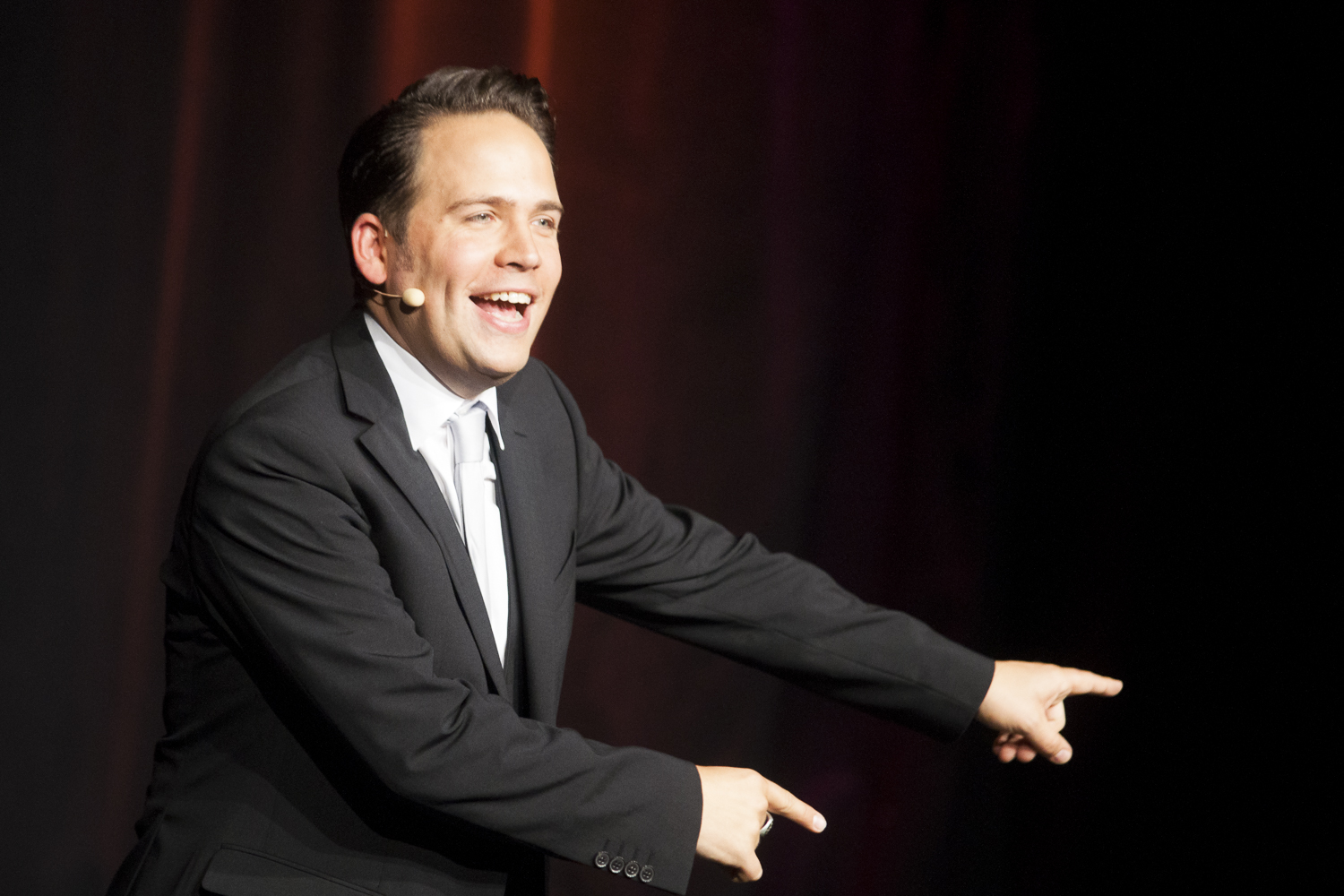
Tiemann in 2013.

Tiemann began his professional radio career in 2003 on 1LIVE, a radio station part of North Rhine-Westphalian public broadcaster WDR. He then joined the satirical radio program Zugabe on WDR 2 since 2004. He was a writer and an actor on radio play crime series Eins Live Dekoder in 2005 on Deutschlandfunk. Since 2005 he has been a member of the Münster-based improvisational theatre placebotheater and has been an actor since 2006 at various theatre productions held at Theater Münster and Theater Oberhausen. Between 2007 and 2008 he produced the video podcast Das W-Team for Funke Mediengruppe. He also produced the radio play Mutabor in 2008, which was nominated for an award during the ARD Radio Play Days the same year. Since 2009, Tiemann began broadcasting on WDR 5 with his weekly column Tiemanns Wortgeflech, in which he entertainingly explains the origins of idioms and proverbs. For the 200th episode, he published a book version of the column titled Gebratene Störche mit phatten Beats.

=== Audio theatre and later broadcasting career ===
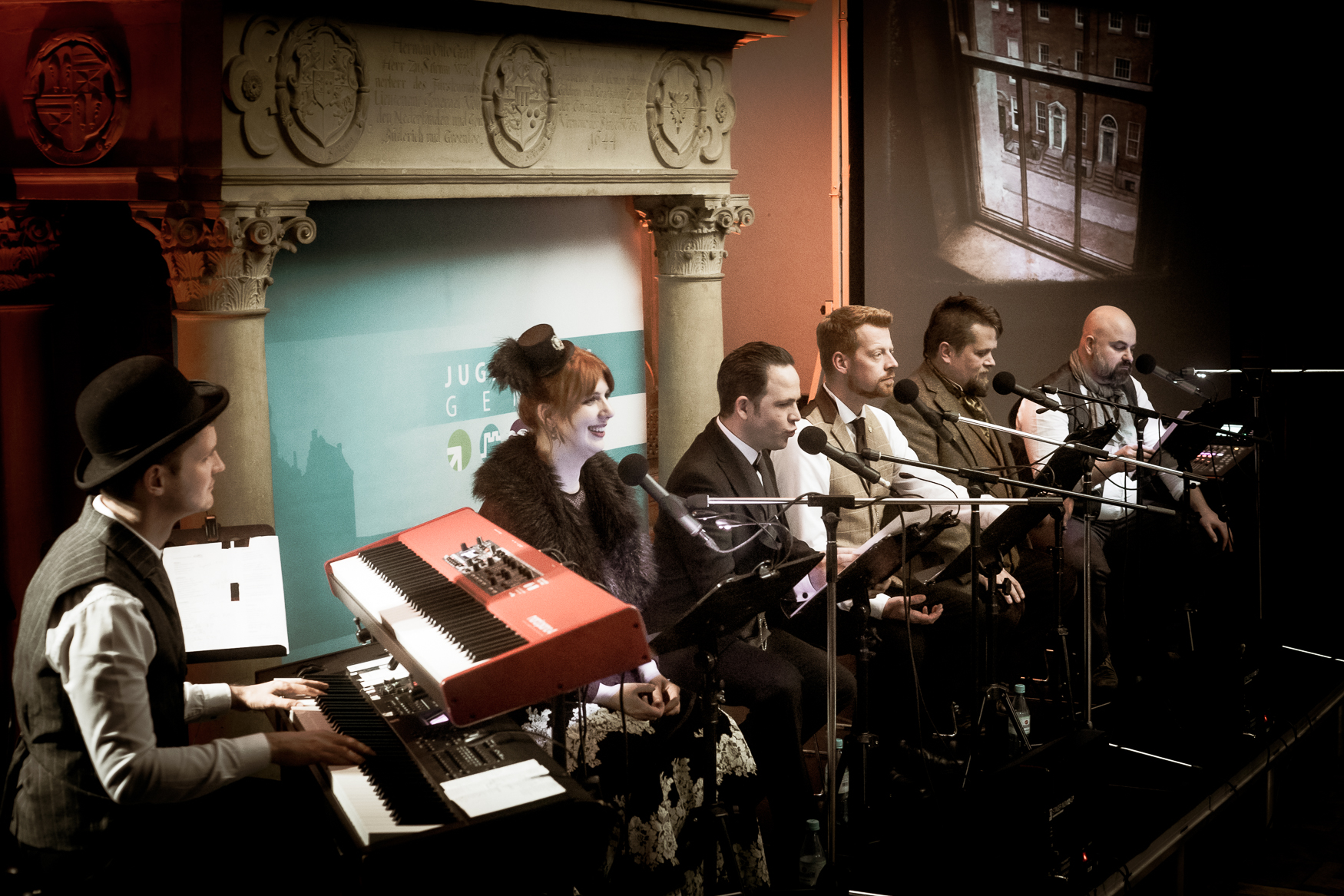
Theater ex libris in 2019.

In 2010, Tiemann debuted his solo cabaret Kabarettverbot and was awarded the prizes Reinheimer Satirelöwe and the Scharfe Barte by the cities of Reinheim and Melsungen in 2011 and 2013, respectively. He made his debut with his ensemble Theater ex libris with an adaptation of the American children book series Three Investigators in 2010 and since then have produced and performed over one hundred readings by 2016. Adaptations of The Adventures of Sherlock Holmes, Dracula and A Christmas Carol have also been produced as live audio plays by Tiemann and Theater ex libris since 2017. The basis for the audio plays have been from the various authors' original texts which he edits and adapts for live audio performing.

During the COVID-19 pandemic in Germany, Tiemann introduced live streaming of selected audio plays in 2020 and 2021 after several cancelations of in-person performances. He released the first studio-recorded audio play adaptation of A Christmas Carol on CD in May 2021. In 2023, he debuted a new podcast about his ensemble and the first episode was released on 5 March.

== Works ==
=== Audio theatre ===
Year	Title	Format	Notes
2010–2018	Three Investigators	Readers theater	
2013–present	Until the blood freezes	Readers theater	
2017–present	"just one word” – a short story of love in 9 1/2 chapters	Readers theater	
2017–present	The Little Prince	Readers theater	
2017–present	A Christmas Carol	Live audio play	
2019	Men's Stories	Readers theater	
2019–present	The Adventures of Sherlock Holmes	Live audio play	
2019–present	Dracula	Live audio play	
2020–present	Alarmstufe Mond	Live audio play	Original play created by Tiemann.
2020–present	Treasure Island	Live audio play	
2021–present	Frankenstein	Live audio play	
2021–present	The Night of Wishes	Live audio play	

=== Bibliography ===
- Tiemann, Christoph (2014). Gebratene Störche mit phatten Beats: Redewendungen und Wortneuschöpfungen auf der Spur. Rowohlt Taschenbuch Verlag. ISBN 978-3499628719.

=== Radio ===
Year	Program	Station	Notes
2004–present	Zugabe	WDR 2	Contributor
2005	EinsLive Dekoder		Speaker and author, radio play series
2009–present	Tiemanns Wortgeflecht	WDR 5	
2011	Im Beichtstuhl	WDR 5	
2015	Zukunftsträumereien	WDR 5	
2016	3, 4, 7, 12, 13, 23 … Magisch, oder?	WDR 5	
2016	50 Jahre Star Trek	WDR 5	
2016	Kirk Douglas wird 100	WDR 5	
2016–present	Tiemanns Meldung der Woche	WDR 5	Series
2019	Alexander von Humboldt: Feature 250	WDR 5	

=== Stage ===
==== As actor ====
Year	Title	Location	Notes
2006	The Broken Jug	Städtische Bühnen Münster	
2006	Minetti	Städtische Bühnen Münster	
2006	Betrogen	Städtische Bühnen Münster	
2007	Richard III	Städtische Bühnen Münster	
2007	King Arthur	Städtische Bühnen Münster	
2008	At the Arche at Eight	Theater Oberhausen	
2009	“O wide valleys, o heights”	Städtische Bühnen Münster	

==== As playwright ====
Year	Title	Notes
2003	Waiting for Bobby Watson	
2004	Othello – Away from Africa	
2006	The All American Arztroman	
2015	MOON ROCKET MASSACRE, A Retrofuturistical	
2015	The Martian Chronicles	
2017	The SOAP thing	

== Awards ==
Tiemann received the 2020/2021 Münsterland Journalism Award in Culture/Tourism for his broadcast series Tiemann testet from WDR Lokalzeit Münsterland. He has also received in 2016 the Economic and Cultural Promotion Prize by the city of Selm, his hometown.

== External sources ==
- Christoph Tiemann official website
- Christoph Tiemann at IMDb
- Christoph Tiemann at Stadtensemble Münster
