= Dietlind Tiemann =

German politician

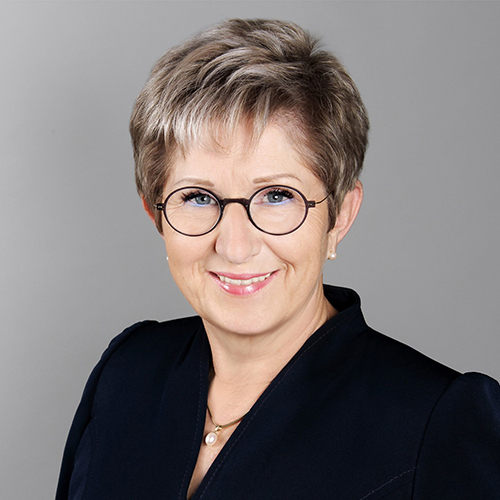
- Tiemann in 2017

Member of the Bundestag; for Brandenburg an der Havel – Potsdam-Mittelmark I – Havelland III – Teltow-Fläming I
- In office 24 October 2017 – 26 October 2021
- Preceded by: Angelika Krüger-Leißner
- Succeeded by: Sonja Eichwede

Lord Mayor of Brandenburg an der Havel
- In office 17 December 2003 – 24 October 2017
- Preceded by: Helmut Schmidt; Norbert Langerwisch (acting)
- Succeeded by: Steffen Scheller

Personal details
- Born: 30 August 1955 (age 71) Genthin, East Germany
- Party: Christian Democratic Union
- Children: 1
- Education: Hochschule Mittweida

Dietlind Tiemann (born 30 August 1955) is a German politician of the Christian Democratic Union (CDU) who served as a member of the Bundestag from the state of Brandenburg from 2017–2021.

== Political career ==
Tiemann became a member of the Bundestag in the 2017 German federal election. In parliament, she served on the Finance Committee and the Committee on Education, Research and Technology Assessment.

In the 2021 German federal election, Tiemann failed to defend her seat, losing it to Social Democratic Party candidate Sonja Eichwede.

== Political positions ==
Ahead of the Christian Democrats’ leadership election in 2021, Tiemann publicly endorsed Friedrich Merz to succeed Annegret Kramp-Karrenbauer as the party’s chair.
