= Edmund C. Tiemann =

American politician (1922–2009)

Edmund Conrad Tiemann (March 28, 1922 – August 23, 2009) was an American businessman, military officer, and politician.

Tiemann was born in Melrose, Stearns County, Minnesota and graduate from Melrose High School. He served in the United States Navy during World War II and then served in the Minnesota National Guard from 1947 to 1991. He lived in Melrose, Minnesota with his wife and children, Tiemann went to College of Saint Benedict and Saint John's University in Collegeville, Minnesota and to University of Minnesota Law School. He also worked as the office manager for the Melrose Telephone Company. Tieman served in the Minnesota House of Representatives from 1951 to 1962. He died at Pine Villa Care Center in Melrose, Minnesota. His funeral and burial was in Melrose, Minnesota.
