= Landgericht Bremen =

Courthouse in Bremen, Germany

Coordinates: 53°4′27″N 8°48′37″E

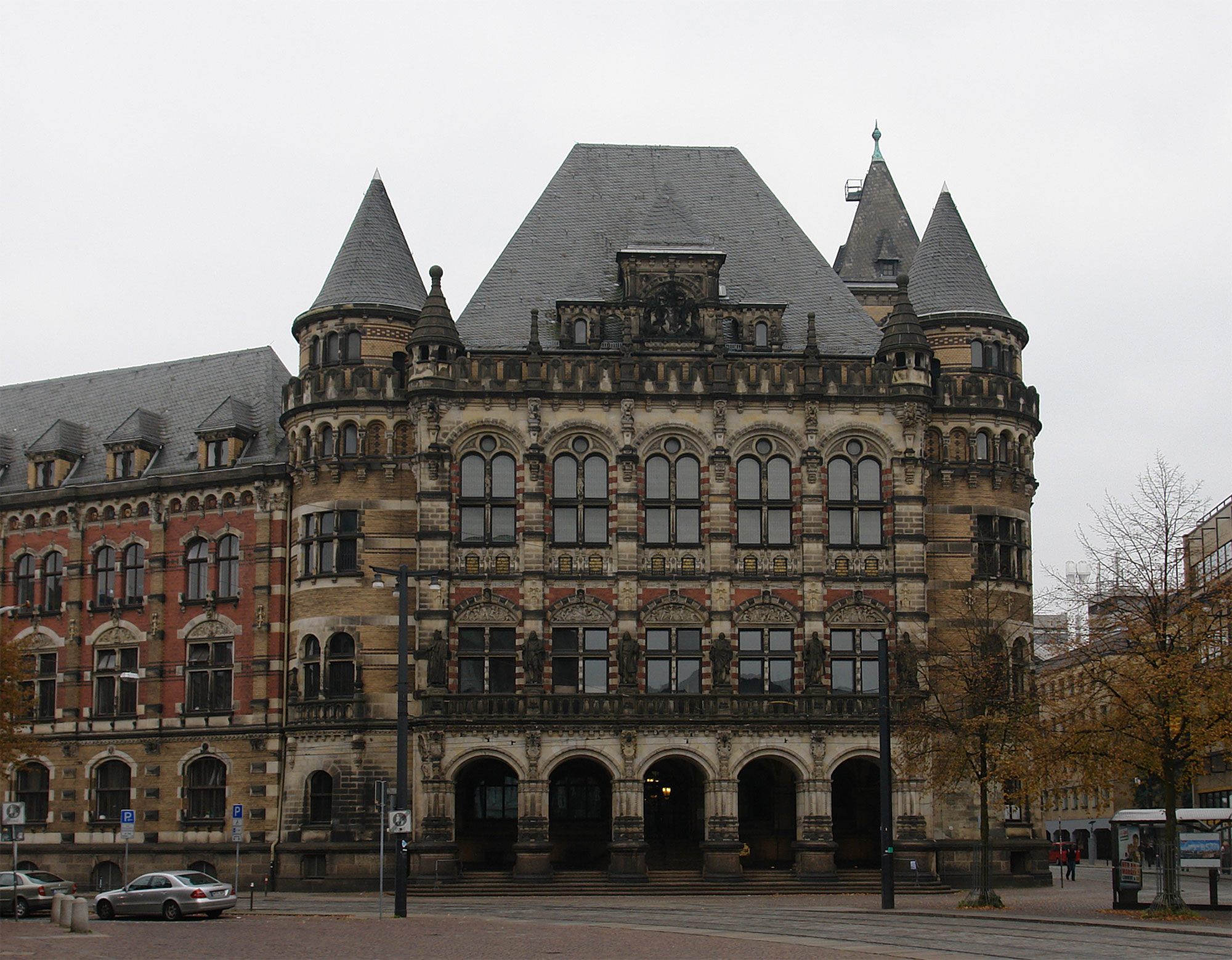
Landgericht Bremen (Bremen Courthouse)

The Landgericht Bremen is the courthouse of the State of Bremen on the Domsheide in the old town of Bremen, Germany. It was built in the late 19th century in the French Renaissance style and completed in 1906. It has been a listed building since 1992. In addition to the judicial services of the regional court, the building houses sections of the Public Prosecutor's department (Staatsanwaltschaft) and of the district court (Amtsgericht).

== History and architecture ==
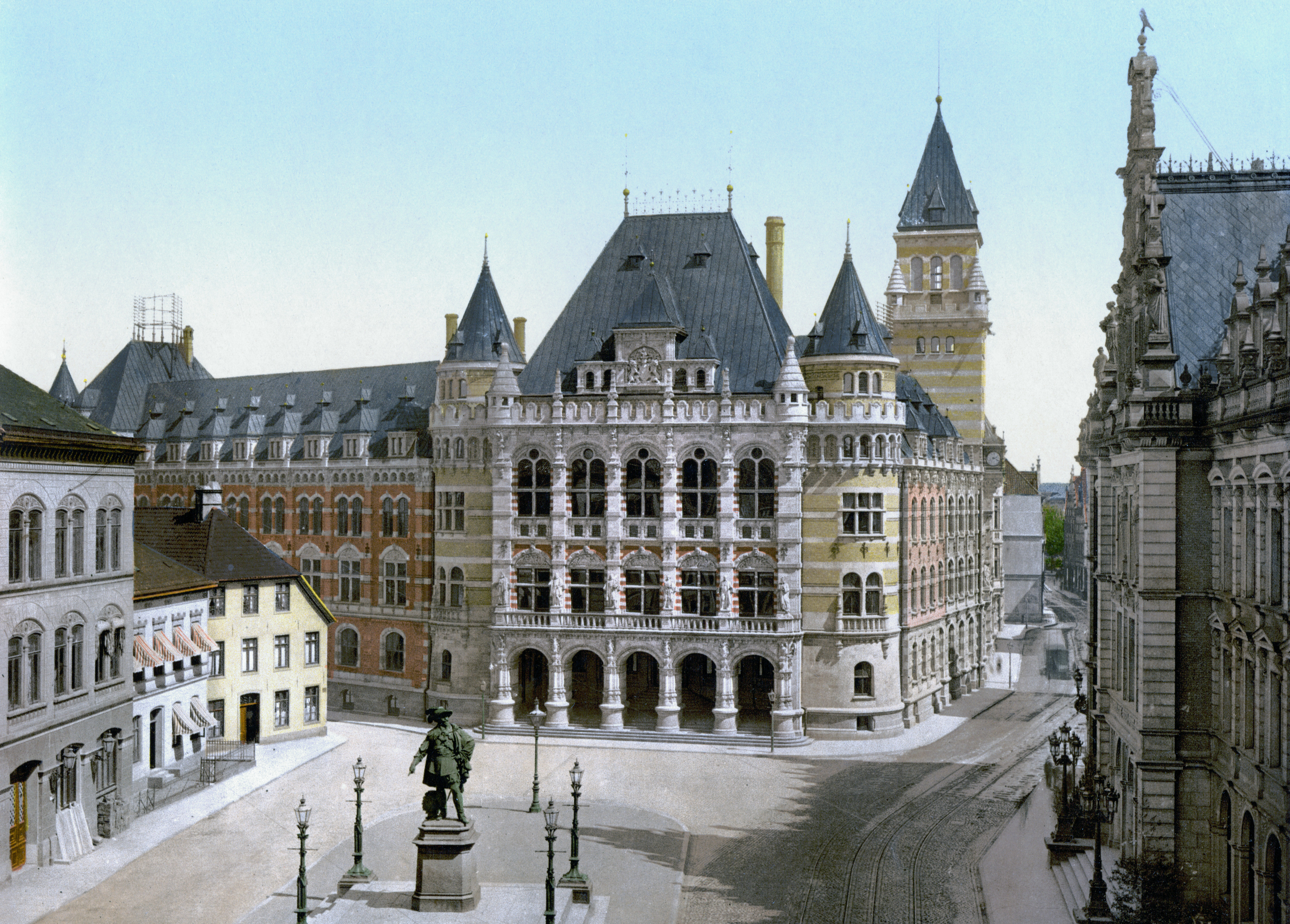
The Bremen Courthouse in 1900

The courthouse and remand prison were built from 1891 to 1895 and from 1902 to 1906 by the Oldenburg architects Ludwig Klingenberg (1840–1924) and his partner Hugo Weber. Together with the two wings of the remand prison, the sprawling complex extends over an entire block. The design is based on the functional requirements of its judicial services although its staircase and courtroom fully reflect the sophistications of the period. The outer walls are inspired by French Renaissance architecture, especially features from the Château of Blois, and are richly decorated. The statue of Justice on Ostertorstraße is the work of Rudolph Lauer (1852–1900).

Largely spared the effects of World War II, the building has been restored on several occasions. A plaque on the Ostertorstraße reads: Dies Haus ist gewidmet dem Rechte zum Schutz – dem Boesen zum Trutz (This building is dedicated to upholding the law and to defying evil). The impressive sandstone and bronze decorations of the cornice include lions, the heads of Megaera and Medusa, and dragons spouting rainwater. The massive round towers, the diamond-shaped decorations on the facade, the granite window frames together with the bas-reliefs, the round-arched windows and the combination of styles are all typical of the Wilhelmistic chapter of Historicist architecture. Stained-glass windows depict the Ten Commandments above the entrance and the cardinal virtues in the first floor windows overlooking Violenstraße. The figures of animals and birds decorating the corbels symbolize vice in the struggle for virtue. The Hanseatic Arms are presented in the form of a maiolica crest representing shipping and trade.

== Gallery ==
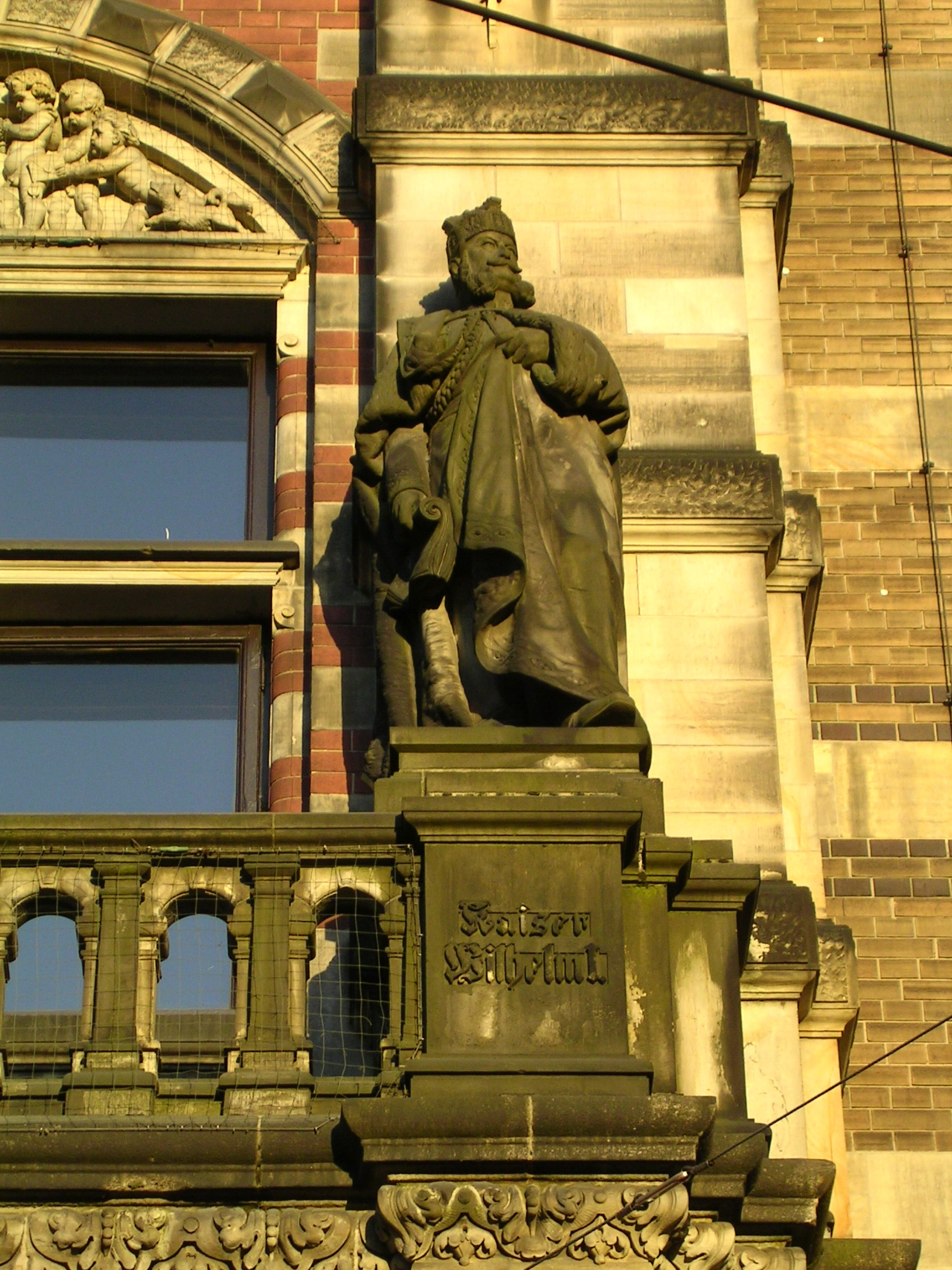
Kaiser Wilhelm statue

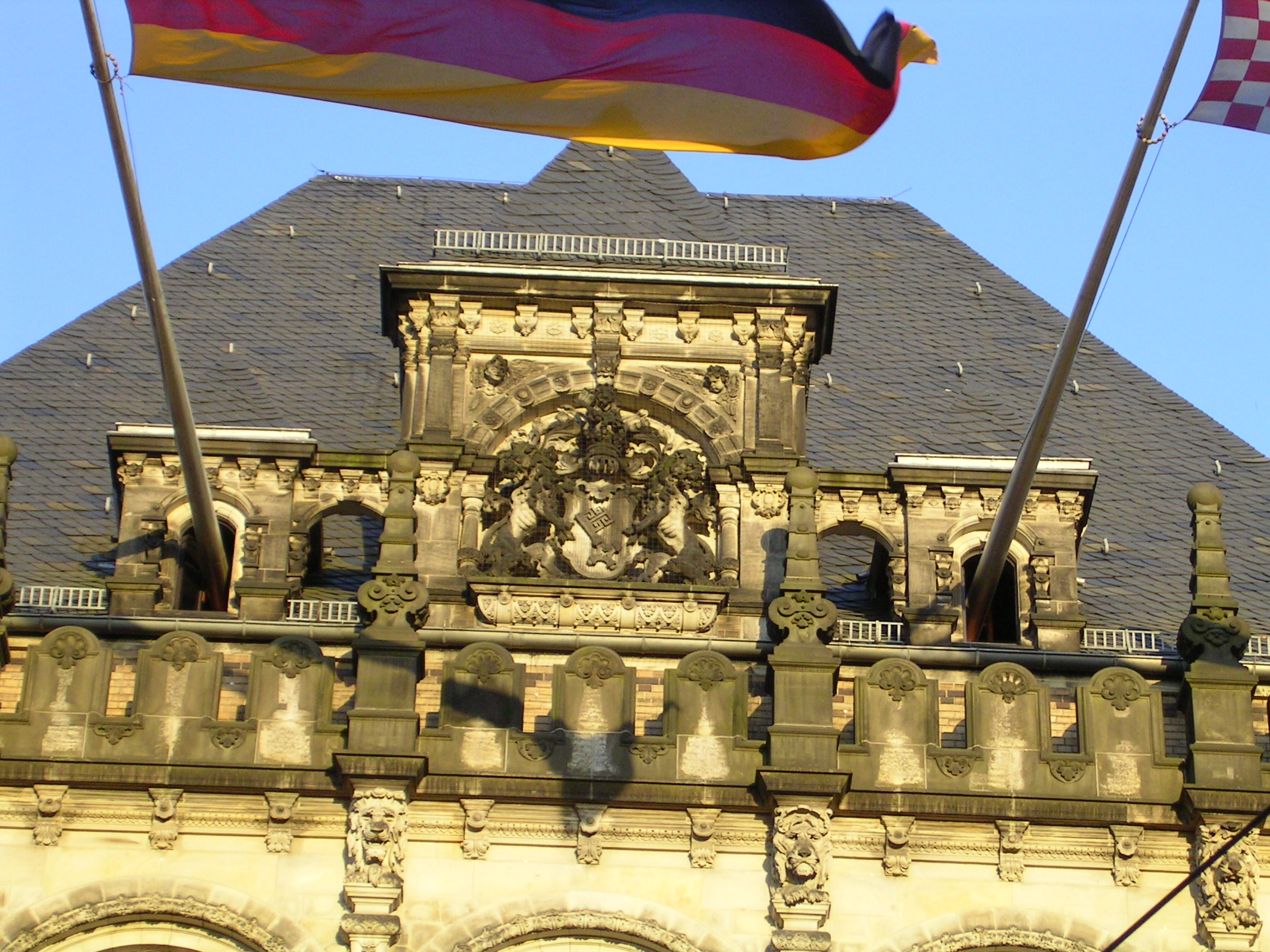
Cornice

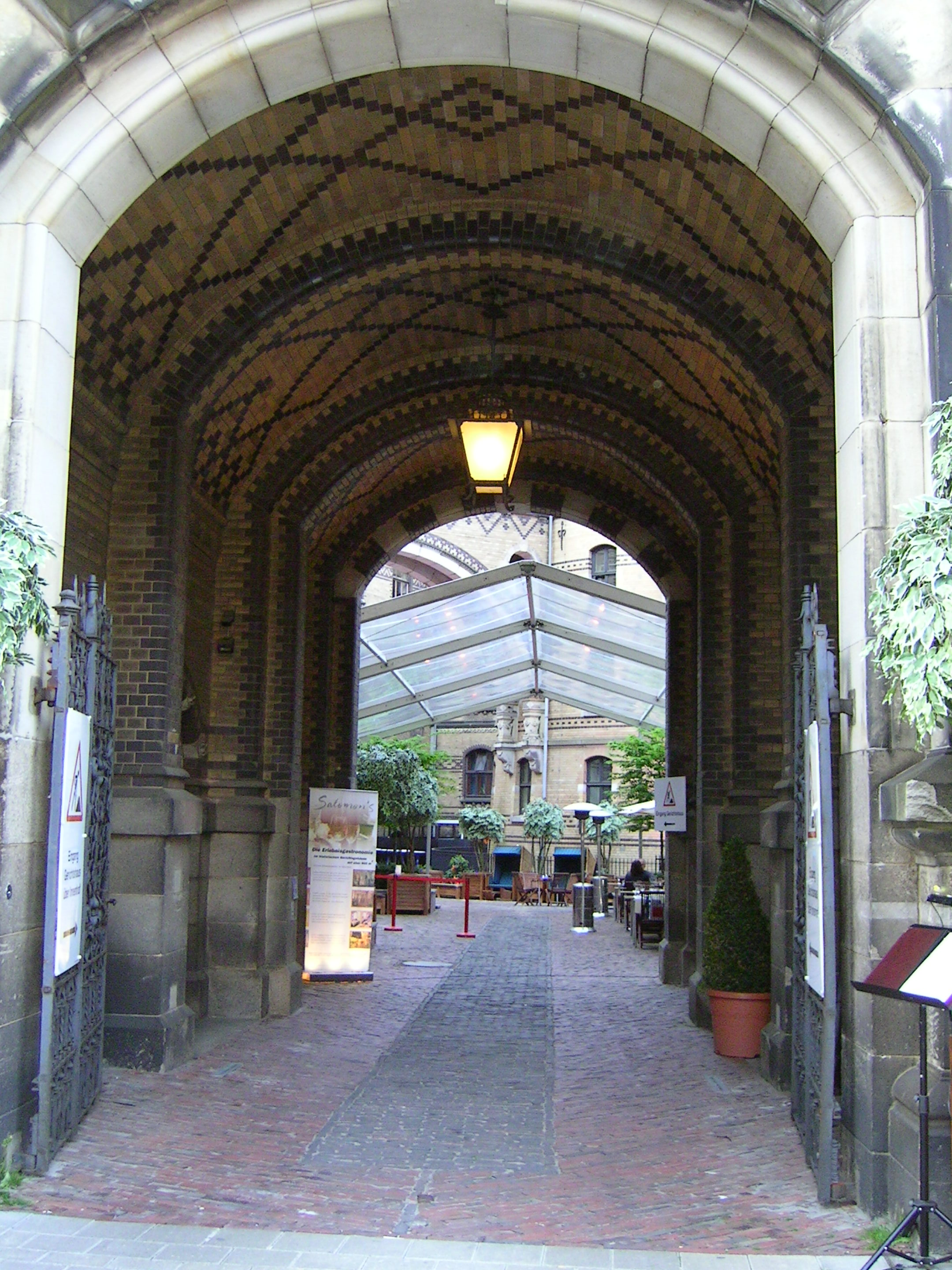
Entrance to courtyard

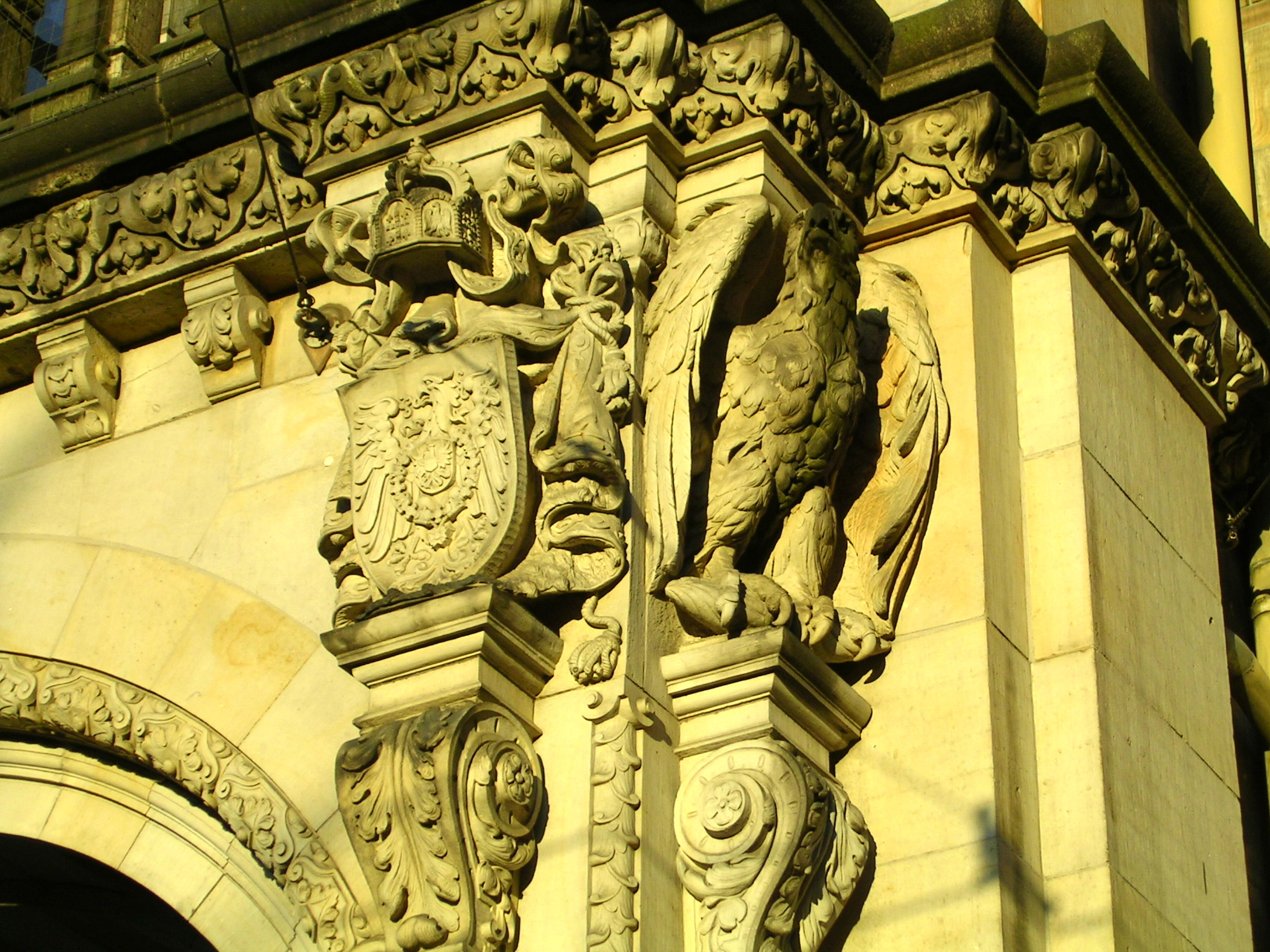
Corbel

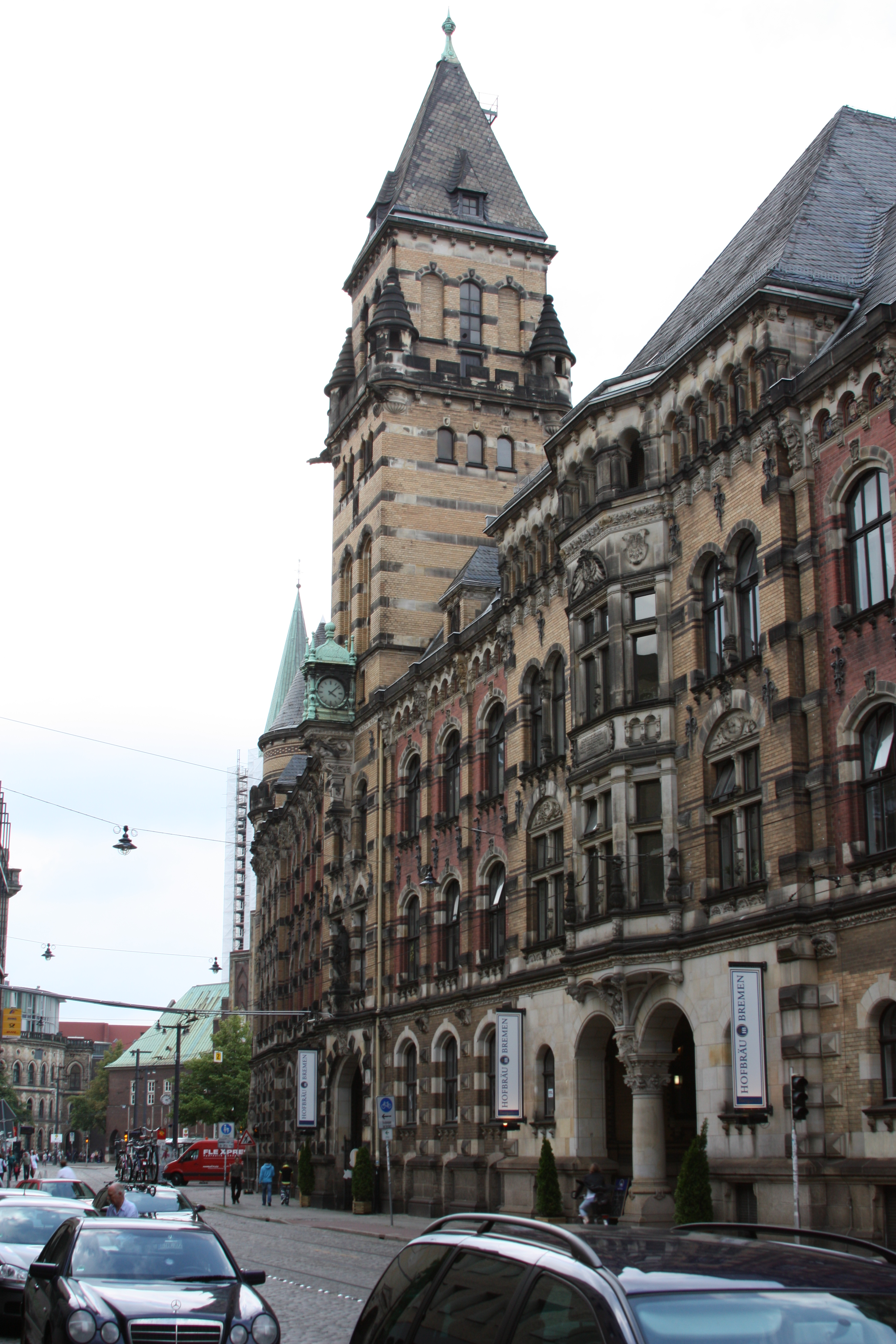
Side view

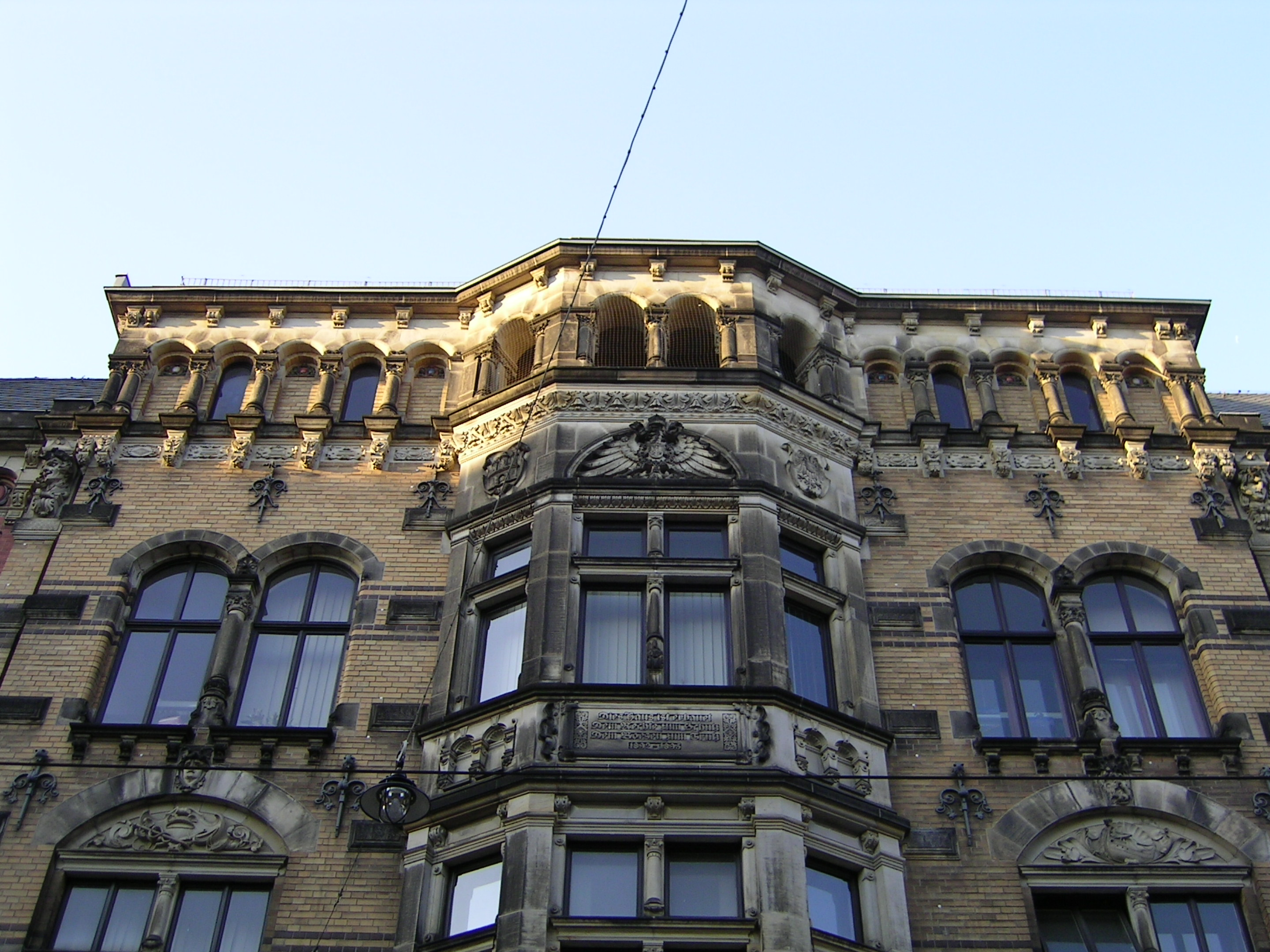
Facade with dedication plaque

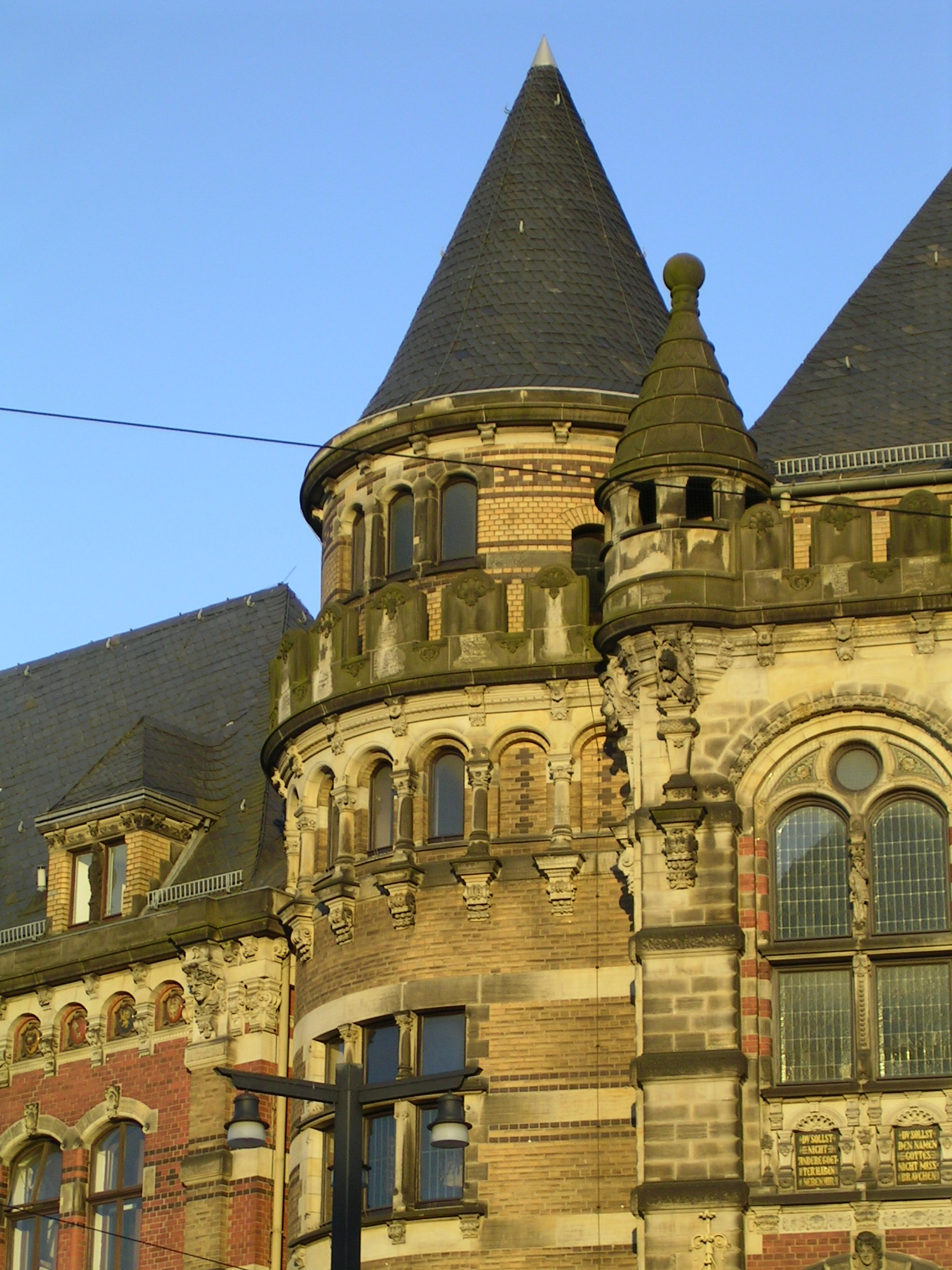
Round tower

== See also ==
- Forum am Wall (adjacent to the Courthouse)

== Literature ==
- Larisch, Norbert (1995). Gerichtshaus und Staatsanwaltschaft Bremen.: Baugeschichte, Handwerkskunst und Allegorien (in German). Hauschild H.M. GmbH. ISBN 978-3-929902-65-5.
- Richter, Walther (1998). 100 Jahre Gerichtshaus in Bremen (in German). WMIT-Dr.- und -Verlag-GmbH. ISBN 978-3-929542-11-0.
