= Rudolf Hellgrewe =

German painter

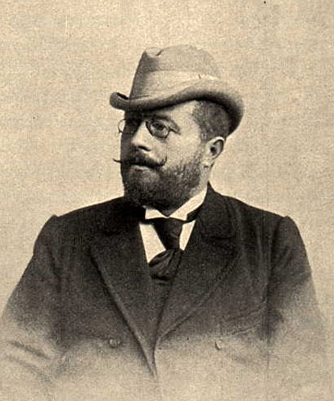

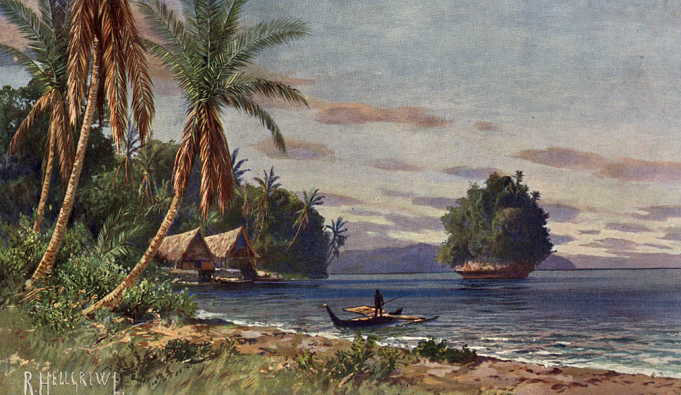
Village on the Palau Islands, c.1908

Rudolf Hellgrewe (6 October 1860 – 1935) was a German landscape painter and illustrator. He taught for a long time at the Kunstgewerbemuseum (Museum of Decorative Arts) in Berlin. He is the most famous painter of Germany's colonies.

Hellgrewe was born in Hammerstein in the Province of Prussia. He attended the Königstädtische Realschule and later the Andreas Realschule in Berlin before studying under Eugen Bracht and Christian Wilberg at the Berliner Kunstakademie (Berlin Art Academy). He was drawn to landscape painting, and became known as the "painter of Brandenburg's lakes and sunsets" (Maler märkischer Seen und Sonnenuntergänge).

In 1885–86 Hellgrewe travelled to East Africa, where he made numerous paintings. He later illustrated the books of the African explorers Carl Peters and Hermann von Wissmann, and produced dioramas of life in Germany's tropical colonies for use in schools. In 1888 at Berlin he published many of his works as a book, Aus Deutsch-Ostafrika. He took part in the colonial exhibitions of 1896 and 1907, and was one of the founding members of the Deutsches Kolonialmuseum (German Colonial Museum) in 1899. He also joined the Berliner Schriftsteller-Klub (Berlin Writers' Club). In 1903 the great Deutsche Kolonialhaus (German Colonial House) was constructed based on the native architecture of the colonies. Hellgrewe provided the ceiling paintings.

Hellgrewe received Medal for Art and Science (Medaille für Kunst und Wissenschaft) from the Grand Duchy of Mecklenburg-Schwerin and the Honorary Medal of the Geographical Society of Jena (Geographischen Gesellschaft zu Jena). He died at Berlin in 1935. By his wife, Anna Lagatz, whom he married 2 April 1887, he left three children: Joachim (born 30 December 1887), Anne Marie (born 23 February 1891) and Wolf Dietrich (born 20 July 1894). Joachim followed in his father's footsteps, becoming a landscape painter and art restorer. Joachim died 30 March 1956.

== Sources ==
- Degener, Herrmann August Ludwig (1912). Wer ist's?. Leipzig.
