= Birgit Bessin =

German politician (born 1978)

Birgit Bessin MdB
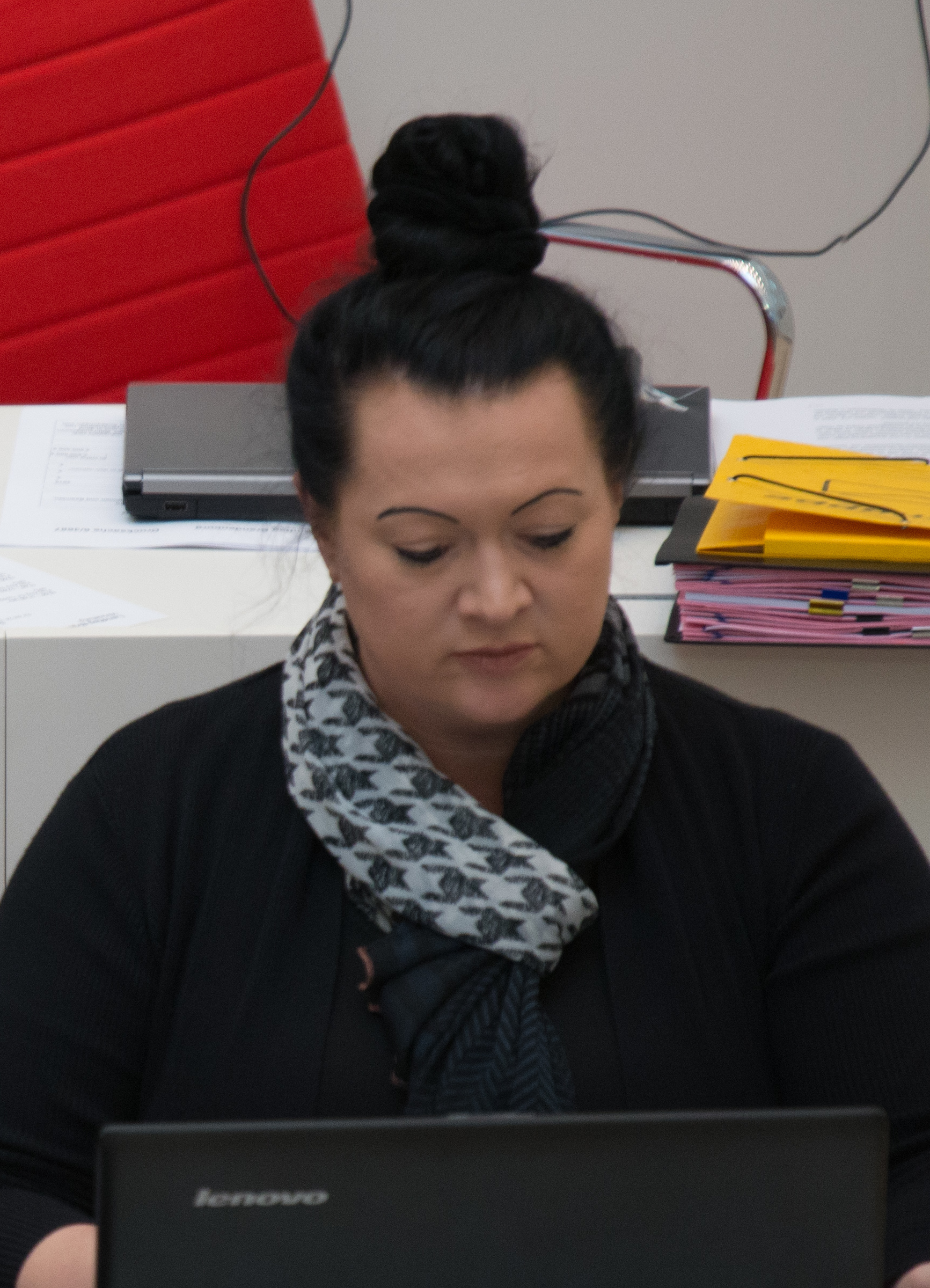
- Bessin in 2016

Member of the Bundestag; for Elbe-Elster – Oberspreewald-Lausitz
- Incumbent
- Assumed office 25 March 2025
- Preceded by: Hannes Walter

Member of the Landtag of Brandenburg
- In office 8 October 2014 – 9 April 2025
- Preceded by: Multi-member district
- Succeeded by: Marlon Deter
- Constituency: State list (2014–2024); Oberspreewald-Lausitz I (2024–2025)

Personal details
- Born: 26 March 1978 (age 48) Worms, West Germany
- Party: Alternative for Germany (since 2013)
- Children: 1
- Education: Free University of Berlin
- Website: birgit-bessin.com

Birgit Irene Bessin (born 26 March 1978) is a German politician serving as a member of the Bundestag since the 2025 federal election. She previously served as a member of the Landtag of Brandenburg from 2014 to 2025.

== Career ==
After receiving her Abitur, Bessin studied jurisprudence at the Free University of Berlin from 1997 to 2007. In 2013 she graduated from the Europäische Fernhochschule Hamburg with a Bachelor of Laws.

She joined Alternative for Germany (AfD) in 2013. In 2015, she signed the Erfurt Resolution, the founding document of AfD's Der Flügel faction. She was elected the AfD Brandenburg chairwoman in 2022 following Andreas Kalbitz's expulsion. She announced in 2024 that she would resign and not run for re-election, as she wanted to "put the party first" and avoid a "power struggle" between her and René Springer, who at the time was serving as deputy chairman. Springer replaced her as chairman.

In the 2024 Brandenburg state election, she received 44.3% of the vote in the Oberspreewald-Lausitz I constituency. She was elected to the Bundestag in the 2025 German federal election, representing the Elbe-Elster – Oberspreewald-Lausitz constituency after gaining 40.9% of the vote. Since June 2025, she has been a member of the Parliamentary Assembly of the Council of Europe as part of the European Conservatives, Patriots & Affiliates political group.

On 11 September 2025, she and a group of constituents visited the Russian embassy in Berlin, paid for by funds from the Press and Information Office of the Federal Government. Members of the Bundestag are allowed to invite up to three groups of visitors with a maximum of 50 constituents. As the visit came a day after the 2025 Russian drone incursion into Poland, MdB Knut Abraham of the Christian Democratic Union stated that the visit was "nothing short of intentional support of the war."

== Views ==
She expressed her support for the far-right movement Pegida at a 2019 AfD convention in Brandenburg.

== Personal life ==
As of 2025, she lives in Rangsdorf.
