= Saskia Ludwig =

German politician

Saskia Ludwig MdB
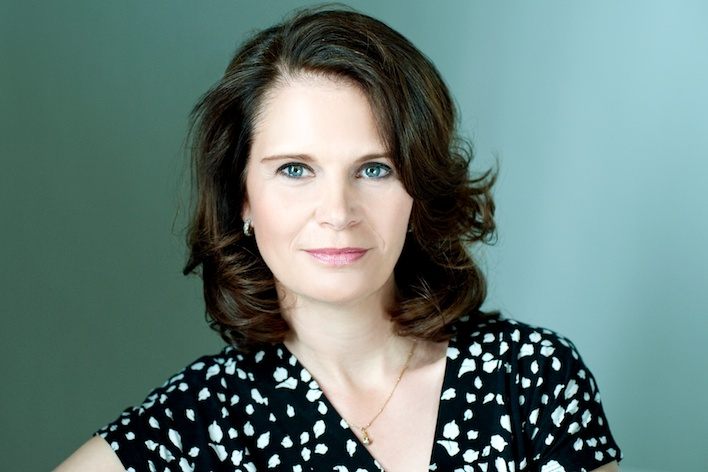
- Ludwig in 2011

Member of the Bundestag; from Brandenburg
- Incumbent
- Assumed office 25 March 2025
- Constituency: State list
- In office 3 December 2019 – 26 October 2021
- Preceded by: Michael Stübgen
- Succeeded by: Hannes Walter
- Constituency: Elbe-Elster – Oberspreewald-Lausitz II

Leader of the Christian Democratic Union in the Landtag of Brandenburg
- In office 27 April 2010 – 11 September 2012
- Preceded by: Johanna Wanka
- Succeeded by: Dieter Dombrowski
- In office 27 January 2009 – 21 October 2009
- Preceded by: Thomas Lunacek
- Succeeded by: Johanna Wanka

Member of the Landtag of Brandenburg
- In office 13 October 2004 – 14 March 2025
- Preceded by: Susanne Melior
- Succeeded by: Corrado Gursch
- Constituency: Potsdam-Mittelmark III/Potsdam III (2004–2019); State list (2019–2025)

Personal details
- Born: 23 May 1968 (age 58) Potsdam, East Germany
- Party: Christian Democratic Union
- Children: 2
- Education: LMU Munich; Free University of Berlin
- Occupation: Politician; businesswoman

Saskia Ludwig (born 23 May 1968) is a German politician.

Born in Potsdam, in the Bezirk Potsdam of East Germany, she represents the Christian Democratic Union (CDU) and has served as a member of the Bundestag for the state of Brandenburg from 2019 to 2021. Ludwig was a member of the Committee on European Union Affairs. She is a member of the conservative Berliner Kreis within the Christian Democratic Union.

== Controversies ==
In 2025, Saskia Ludwig campaigned against the election of Frauke Brosius-Gersdorf as a constitutional judge. Following highly questionable allegations of plagiarism against Brosius-Gersdorf, she demanded that Brosius-Gersdorf temporarily suspend her teaching position at the University of Potsdam. Shortly thereafter it turned out that Ludwig's own work was being investigated by Potsdam University.

In an open letter, over 280 respected lawyers and academics protested against the way the Brosius-Gersdorf affaire was being handled: "Statements by individual members of the Bundestag that their university should take action against Frauke Brosius-Gersdorf based on these positions represent an attack on academic freedom itself."

After the scheduled election of Brosius-Gersdorf in conjunction with two more nominees had been postponed, Saskia Ludwig warned the coalition government led by her party against re-nominating lawyer Frauke Brosius-Gersdorf: “She was and is not eligible for election at any time.”
