= Oberspreewald-Lausitz I =

State electoral district of Germany

38: Oberspreewald-Lausitz I
- Electoral district for the Landtag of Brandenburg
- Oberspreewald-Lausitz I in 2024
- District: Oberspreewald-Lausitz
- Electorate: 33,090 (2024)
- Major settlements: Lauchhammer and Schwarzheide

Current electoral district
- Created: 1994
- Party: AfD
- Member: Birgit Bessin

Oberspreewald-Lausitz I is an electoral constituency (German: Wahlkreis) represented in the Landtag of Brandenburg. It elects one member via first-past-the-post voting. Under the constituency numbering system, it is designated as constituency 38. It is located in within the district of Oberspreewald-Lausitz.

== Geography ==
The constituency includes the towns of Lauchhammer and Schwarzheide, as well as the municipality of Schipkau, and the districts of Ortrand and Ruhland.

There were 33,090 eligible voters in 2024.

== Members ==
Election	Member	Party	%
2004	Ingo Senftleben	CDU	35.0
2009	Ingo Senftleben	CDU	37.1
2014	Ingo Senftleben	CDU	36.2
2019	Ingo Senftleben	CDU	26.3
2024	Birgit Bessin	AfD	44.3

== Election results ==
=== 2024 election ===
State election (2024): Oberspreewald-Lausitz I
Notes:	Blue background denotes the winner of the electorate vote. Pink background denotes a candidate elected from their party list. Yellow background denotes an electorate win by a list member, or other incumbent. A ✓ or ✗ denotes status of any incumbent, win or lose respectively.						
Party	Candidate	Votes	%	±%	Party votes	%	±%
AfD	Birgit Bessin	10,427	44.3	NEW	9,863	41.7	▲5.9
SPD	Martin Höntsch	6,092	25.9	Steady	5,801	24.5	▲1.6
BSW					3,334	14.1	
CDU	Magister	3,729	15.8	▼10.5	2,579	10.9	▼7.4
BVB/FW	Nothing	1,607	6.8	▼2.0	473	2.0	▼1.4
Left	Theiler	1,044	4.4	▼7.0	464	2.0	▼6.6
APT					412	1.7	▼0.3
FDP	Dieckmann	273	1.2	▼4.8	177	0.7	▼3.6
Greens	Neumann	254	1.1	▼2.0	250	1.1	▼2.4
Plus					103	0.4	▼0.6
DLW					84	0.4	
Values					56	0.2	
Third Way					40	0.2	
DKP	Baur	136	0.6		37	0.2	
Informal votes		333			222		
Total valid votes		23,562			23,673		
Turnout		23,895	72.2	▲12.2			
AfD gain from CDU	Majority	4,335	18.4				

=== 2019 election ===
State election (2019): Oberspreewald-Lausitz I
Notes:	Blue background denotes the winner of the electorate vote. Pink background denotes a candidate elected from their party list. Yellow background denotes an electorate win by a list member, or other incumbent. A ✓ or ✗ denotes status of any incumbent, win or lose respectively.						
Party	Candidate	Votes	%	±%	Party votes	%	±%
AfD					7,319	35.7	▲22.5
CDU	✓ Ingo Senftleben	5,160	26.3	▼9.9	3,758	18.3	▼10.4
SPD	Gabriele Theiss	5,067	25.8	▼7.0	4,689	22.9	▼9.1
Independent	Marcel Respa	2,773	14.1				
Left	Ringo Jünigk	2,232	11.4	▼7.1	1,762	8.6	▼7.2
BVB/FW	Roxana Trasper	1,724	8.8	▲4.6	694	3.4	▲2.0
FDP	Krystian Burchart	1,160	5.9		886	4.3	▲3.0
Die PARTEI	Marcus Winter	900	4.6				
Greens	Ricarda Budke	594	3.0	▲1.0	698	3.4	▲1.3
Tierschutzpartei					416	2.0	
Pirates					117	0.6	▼0.5
ÖDP					86	0.4	
V-Partei3					61	▼0.3	
Informal votes		1,185			309		
Total valid votes		19,610			20,486		
Turnout		20,795	60.0	▲13.9			
CDU hold	Majority	93	0.5	▼2.9			

=== 2014 election ===
State election (2014): Oberspreewald-Lausitz I
Notes:	Blue background denotes the winner of the electorate vote. Pink background denotes a candidate elected from their party list. Yellow background denotes an electorate win by a list member, or other incumbent. A ✓ or ✗ denotes status of any incumbent, win or lose respectively.						
Party	Candidate	Votes	%	±%	Party votes	%	±%
CDU	✓ Ingo Senftleben	5,961	36.2	▼0.9	4,739	28.7	▲2.1
SPD	Gabriele Theiss	5,403	32.8	▲12.1	5,283	32.0	▲4.8
Left	Anne Haufe	3,042	18.5	▼8.6	2,610	15.8	▼9.6
AfD					2,189	13.2	
NPD	Thomas Gürtler	1,045	6.3	▲1.5	688	4.2	▲0.3
BVB/FW	René Schöne	686	4.2	▲1.5	230	1.4	▼0.6
Greens	Dirk Marx	324	2.0	▼0.3	343	2.1	▼0.6
FDP					214	1.3	▼6.3
Pirates					183	1.1	
REP					30	0.2	Steady
DKP					21	0.1	Steady
Informal votes		314			245		
Total valid votes		16,461			16,530		
Turnout		16,775	46.1	▼18.1			
CDU hold	Majority	558	3.4	▼13.0			

=== 2009 election ===
State election (2009): Oberspreewald-Lausitz I
Notes:	Blue background denotes the winner of the electorate vote. Pink background denotes a candidate elected from their party list. Yellow background denotes an electorate win by a list member, or other incumbent. A ✓ or ✗ denotes status of any incumbent, win or lose respectively.						
Party	Candidate	Votes	%	±%	Party votes	%	±%
CDU	✓ Ingo Sentleben	9,013	37.1	▲2.1	6,471	26.6	▲2.5
Left	Viola Weinert	6,581	27.1	▼5.8	6,184	25.4	▼0.1
SPD	Gabriele Theiss	5,028	20.7	▼1.1	6,617	27.2	▲2.1
FDP	Michael Schicha	1,269	5.2	▼3.1	1,861	7.6	▲3.5
NPD	Dieter Werner Hans Woche	1,170	4.8		944	3.9	
DVU					764	3.1	▼9.1
BVB/FW	Volker Kurze	666	2.7		491	2.0	
Greens	Uwe Fröhlich	565	2.3	▲0.2	656	2.7	▲1.1
50Plus					136	0.6	▼1.2
RRP					122	0.5	
REP					58	0.2	
Die-Volksinitiative					25	0.1	
DKP					14	0.1	Steady
Informal votes		796			745		
Total valid votes		24,292			24,343		
Turnout		25,088	64.2	▲7.0			
CDU hold	Majority	2,432	10.0	▲7.9			

=== 2004 election ===
State election (2004): Oberspreewald-Lausitz I
Notes:	Blue background denotes the winner of the electorate vote. Pink background denotes a candidate elected from their party list. Yellow background denotes an electorate win by a list member, or other incumbent. A ✓ or ✗ denotes status of any incumbent, win or lose respectively.						
Party	Candidate	Votes	%	±%	Party votes	%	±%
CDU	Ingo Senftleben	7,841	34.95		5,520	24.08	
PDS	Viola Weinert	7,375	32.87		5,846	25.51	
SPD	Esther Schröder	4,894	21.82		5,762	25.14	
DVU					2,800	12.22	
FDP	Christian Lisk	1,853	8.26		941	4.11	
Familie					734	3.20	
50Plus					416	1.82	
Greens	Paul-Georg Fritz	471	2.10		363	1.58	
Gray Panthers					126	0.55	
Yes Brandenburg					109	0.48	
BRB					105	0.46	
AUB-Brandenburg					88	0.38	
AfW (Free Voters)					56	0.24	
DKP					29	0.13	
Schill					25	0.11	
Informal votes		1,094			608		
Total valid votes		22,434			22,920		
Turnout		23,528	57.18				
CDU win new seat	Majority	466	2.08				

== See also ==
- Politics of Brandenburg
- Landtag of Brandenburg
