= Corrado Gursch =

German politician (born 1988)

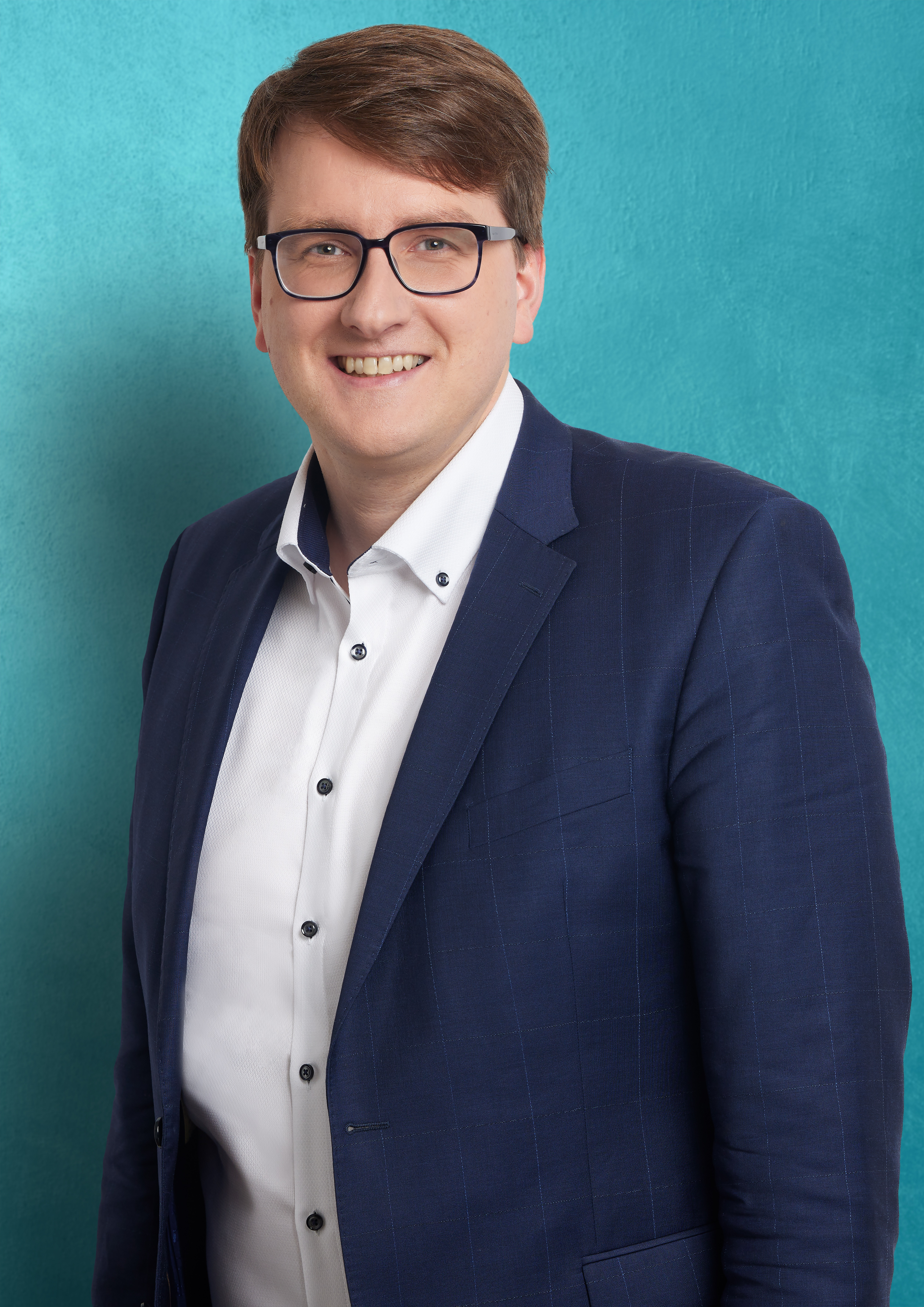
- Gursch in 2024

Member of the Landtag of Brandenburg
- Incumbent
- Assumed office 15 March 2025
- Preceded by: Saskia Ludwig

Personal details
- Born: 1988 (age 37–38)
- Party: Christian Democratic Union (since 2011)

Corrado Gursch (born 1988) is a German politician serving as a member of the Landtag of Brandenburg since 2025. From 2019 to 2025, he served as chief of staff to Uwe Feiler.
