= Elbe-Elster – Oberspreewald-Lausitz =

Federal electoral district of Germany

65 Elbe-Elster – Oberspreewald-Lausitz
- Electoral district for the Bundestag
- Elbe-Elster – Oberspreewald-Lausitz in 2025
- State: Brandenburg
- Population: 195,200 (2019)
- Electorate: 162,410 (2021)
- Major settlements: Senftenberg; Finsterwalde; Lauchhammer
- Area: 2,844.52 km^{2}

Current electoral district
- Created: 2002
- Party: AfD
- Member: Birgit Bessin
- Elected: 2025

Elbe-Elster – Oberspreewald-Lausitz is an electoral constituency (German: Wahlkreis) represented in the Bundestag. It elects one member via first-past-the-post voting. Under the current constituency numbering system, it is designated as constituency 65. It is located in southern Brandenburg, comprising the districts of Elbe-Elster and Oberspreewald-Lausitz.

Elbe-Elster – Oberspreewald-Lausitz was created for the 2002 federal election. From 2021 to 2025, it was represented by Hannes Walter of the Social Democratic Party (SPD). Since 2025 it has been represented by Birgit Bessin of the AfD.

== Geography ==
Elbe-Elster – Oberspreewald-Lausitz is located in southern Brandenburg. As of the 2025 federal election, it comprises the Elbe-Elster district and the Oberspreewald-Lausitz district.

== History ==
Elbe-Elster – Oberspreewald-Lausitz was created in 2002 and contained parts of the abolished constituencies of Senftenberg – Calau – Spremberg and Bad Liebenwerda – Finsterwalde – Herzberg – Lübben – Luckau. In the 2002 and 2005 elections, it was constituency 65 in the numbering system. In the 2009 election, it was number 66. Since the 2013 election, it has been number 65. Until 2025, it excluded the municipality of Lübbenau.

Election	No.	Name	Borders
2002	65	Elbe-Elster – Oberspreewald-Lausitz II	Elbe-Elster district; Oberspreewald-Lausitz district (excluding Lübbenau municipality)
2005	65	Elbe-Elster – Oberspreewald-Lausitz II	Elbe-Elster district; Oberspreewald-Lausitz district (excluding Lübbenau municipality)
2009	66	Elbe-Elster – Oberspreewald-Lausitz II	Elbe-Elster district; Oberspreewald-Lausitz district (excluding Lübbenau municipality)
2013	65	Elbe-Elster – Oberspreewald-Lausitz II	Elbe-Elster district; Oberspreewald-Lausitz district (excluding Lübbenau municipality)
2017	65	Elbe-Elster – Oberspreewald-Lausitz II	Elbe-Elster district; Oberspreewald-Lausitz district (excluding Lübbenau municipality)
2021	65	Elbe-Elster – Oberspreewald-Lausitz II	Elbe-Elster district; Oberspreewald-Lausitz district (excluding Lübbenau municipality)
2025	65	Elbe-Elster – Oberspreewald-Lausitz	Elbe-Elster district; Oberspreewald-Lausitz district

== Members ==
The constituency was first represented by Stephan Hilsberg of the Social Democratic Party (SPD) from 2002 to 2009. Michael Stübgen of the Christian Democratic Union (CDU) was elected in the 2009 election, and re-elected in 2013 and 2017. He resigned in November 2019 after being appointed to the state government of Brandenburg. Hannes Walter regained the constituency for the SPD in 2021. In 2025 Birgit Bessin defeated Walter and won the consistency for the AFD.

Election	Member	Party	%
2002	Stephan Hilsberg	SPD	44.5
2005	Stephan Hilsberg	SPD	34.8
2009	Michael Stübgen	CDU	28.9
2013	Michael Stübgen	CDU	40.9
2017	Michael Stübgen	CDU	29.5
2021	Hannes Walter	SPD	25.4
2025	Birgit Bessin	AfD	43.0

== Election results ==
=== 2025 election ===
Federal election (2025): Elbe-Elster – Oberspreewald-Lausitz
Notes:	Blue background denotes the winner of the electorate vote. Pink background denotes a candidate elected from their party list. Yellow background denotes an electorate win by a list member, or other incumbent. A ✓ or ✗ denotes status of any incumbent, win or lose respectively.						
Party	Candidate	Votes	%	±%	Party votes	%	±%
AfD	Birgit Bessin	57,194	43.0	▲18.3	54,660	40.9	▲16.1
CDU	Knut Abraham	24,330	18.3	▲1.9	22,039	16.5	▲1.5
SPD	✗ Hannes Walter	22,087	16.6	▼9.3	16,688	12.5	▼16.1
BSW					15,592	11.7	New
Left	Klaus-Günter Karich	15,939	12.0	▲3.0	11,645	8.7	▲1.5
FW	Sandra Raddatz	6,999	5.3	▲1.2	2,754	2.1	▼1.0
FDP	Johannes Hänig	3,821	2.9	▼6.0	4,112	3.1	▼6.2
Greens	Jenifer Howel	2,703	2.0	▼1.4	3,732	2.8	▼1.4
PARTEI					1,045	0.8	▼0.4
Volt					738	0.6	▲0.4
BD					393	0.3	New
MLPD					85	0.1	0.0
Informal votes		1,413			1,003		
Total valid votes		133,073			133,483		
Turnout		134,486	79.5	▲5.4			
AfD gain from SPD	Majority	32,864	24.7	N/A			

=== 2021 election ===
Federal election (2021): Elbe-Elster – Oberspreewald-Lausitz II
Notes:	Blue background denotes the winner of the electorate vote. Pink background denotes a candidate elected from their party list. Yellow background denotes an electorate win by a list member, or other incumbent. A ✓ or ✗ denotes status of any incumbent, win or lose respectively.						
Party	Candidate	Votes	%	±%	Party votes	%	±%
SPD	Hannes Walter	29,998	25.4	▲8.7	33,412	28.2	▲12.8
AfD	Silvio Wolf	29,560	25.0	▲0.3	29,849	25.2	0.0
CDU	Knut Abraham	19,130	16.2	▼13.3	17,776	15.0	▼12.7
Left	Yvonne Mahlo	10,630	9.0	▼7.2	8,532	7.2	▼8.3
FDP	Martin Neumann	10,597	9.0	▲3.6	11,114	9.4	▲2.7
Independent	Marcel Respa	5,066	4.3		2,022	1.7	
FW	Roxana Trasper	4,872	4.1	▲0.1	3,657	3.1	▲1.4
Greens	Paul-Philipp Neumann	4,110	3.5	▲0.5	4,920	4.2	▲1.6
Tierschutzpartei					2,564	2.2	▲0.6
PARTEI	Bianca Schröder	2,245	1.9		1,383	1.2	▲0.2
dieBasis	Kay-Uwe Blietz	1,719	1.5		1,449	1.2	
NPD					637	0.5	▼0.9
Pirates					437	0.4	
Independent	Ilona Janda	356	0.3				
Volt					194	0.2	
Team Todenhöfer					156	0.1	
ÖDP					128	0.1	0.0
DKP					92	0.1	0.0
Humanists					87	0.1	
MLPD					55	0.0	0.0
Informal votes		2,068			1,887		
Total valid votes		118,283			118,464		
Turnout		120,351	74.1	▲0.9			
SPD gain from CDU	Majority	438	0.4				

=== 2017 election ===
Federal election (2017): Elbe-Elster – Oberspreewald-Lausitz II
Notes:	Blue background denotes the winner of the electorate vote. Pink background denotes a candidate elected from their party list. Yellow background denotes an electorate win by a list member, or other incumbent. A ✓ or ✗ denotes status of any incumbent, win or lose respectively.						
Party	Candidate	Votes	%	±%	Party votes	%	±%
CDU	✓ Michael Stübgen	35,633	29.5	▼11.4	33,576	27.7	▼11.8
AfD	Peter Holger Drenske	29,830	24.7		30,564	25.2	▲19.3
SPD	Hannes Walter	20,142	16.7	▼5.9	18,700	15.4	▼4.4
Left	Diana Tietze	19,583	16.2	▼7.2	18,775	15.5	▼6.2
FDP	Martin Neumann	6,492	5.4	▲3.6	8,128	6.7	▲4.2
FW	Johannes Berger	4,887	4.0		2,089	1.7	▲0.8
Greens	Stefan Schön	3,543	2.9	▲0.4	3,146	2.6	▼0.1
Tierschutzpartei					1,878	1.6	
NPD					1,757	1.5	▼2.3
PARTEI					1,207	1.0	
Independent	Ingo Weidelt	738	0.6				
DM					555	0.5	
BGE					421	0.3	
ÖDP					150	0.1	
MLPD					108	0.1	0.0
DKP					100	0.1	
Informal votes		2,517			2,211		
Total valid votes		120,848			121,154		
Turnout		123,365	73.2	▲6.4			
CDU hold	Majority	5,803	4.8	▼12.7			

=== 2013 election ===
Federal election (2013): Elbe-Elster – Oberspreewald-Lausitz II
Notes:	Blue background denotes the winner of the electorate vote. Pink background denotes a candidate elected from their party list. Yellow background denotes an electorate win by a list member, or other incumbent. A ✓ or ✗ denotes status of any incumbent, win or lose respectively.						
Party	Candidate	Votes	%	±%	Party votes	%	±%
CDU	✓ Michael Stübgen	47,454	40.9	▲12.0	46,044	39.5	▲12.1
Left	Matthias Mnich	27,137	23.4	▼4.9	25,321	21.7	▼6.3
SPD	Kerstin Weide	26,132	22.5	▼4.4	23,136	19.9	▼3.1
AfD					6,911	5.9	
NPD	Manuela Kokott	5,608	4.8	▲0.3	4,421	3.8	▲0.7
Pirates	Lutz Bommel	3,834	3.3		2,626	2.3	▼0.2
Greens	Klaus Ullrich	2,899	2.5	▼0.7	3,104	2.7	▼0.8
FDP	Carmen Schulz	2,085	1.8	▼5.2	2,950	2.5	▼6.4
FW					1,122	1.0	
Independent	Kevin Jonik	540	0.5				
PRO					531	0.5	
DKP	Wilfried Klare	323	0.3				
REP					196	0.2	▼0.1
MLPD					153	0.1	0.0
Informal votes		2,668			2,165		
Total valid votes		116,012			116,515		
Turnout		118,680	66.8	▲1.3			
CDU hold	Majority	20,317	17.5	▲16.9			

=== 2009 election ===
Federal election (2009): Elbe-Elster – Oberspreewald-Lausitz II
Notes:	Blue background denotes the winner of the electorate vote. Pink background denotes a candidate elected from their party list. Yellow background denotes an electorate win by a list member, or other incumbent. A ✓ or ✗ denotes status of any incumbent, win or lose respectively.						
Party	Candidate	Votes	%	±%	Party votes	%	±%
CDU	Michael Stübgen	35,073	28.9	▲3.0	33,467	27.4	▲3.6
Left	André Brie	34,324	28.3	▲2.4	34,203	28.0	▲0.7
SPD	Thomas Zenker	32,688	26.9	▼7.9	28,022	22.9	▼8.7
FDP	Enrico Buchs	8,487	7.0	▲1.4	10,865	8.9	▲1.7
NPD	Manuela Kokott	5,513	4.5	▼0.8	3,839	3.1	▼1.8
Greens	Christoph Wunnicke	3,861	3.2	▲0.7	4,238	3.5	▲0.2
Pirates					2,995	2.5	
DVU					2,399	2.0	
FWD					1,435	1.2	
Freie Union	Harald Klingenberg	915	0.8				
Independent	Andreas Brückner	587	0.5				
REP					278	0.2	
BüSo					270	0.2	
MLPD					137	0.1	▼0.2
Informal votes		4,692			3,992		
Total valid votes		121,448			122,148		
Turnout		126,140	65.5	▼9.0			
CDU gain from SPD	Majority	749	0.6				

=== 2005 election ===
Federal election (2005):Elbe-Elster - Oberspreewald-Lausitz II
Notes:	Blue background denotes the winner of the electorate vote. Pink background denotes a candidate elected from their party list. Yellow background denotes an electorate win by a list member, or other incumbent. A ✓ or ✗ denotes status of any incumbent, win or lose respectively.						
Party	Candidate	Votes	%	±%	Party votes	%	±%
SPD	✓ Stephan Hilsberg	50,985	34.8	▼9.6	46,438	31.7	▼14.1
CDU	Michael Stübgen	37,826	25.9	▼2.1	34,944	23.8	▼2.2
Left	Hans Gabbe	37,797	25.8	▲7.2	40,065	27.3	▲11.6
FDP	Ulrich Hartenstein	8,223	5.6	▼1.1	10,491	7.2	▲1.0
NPD	Manuela Kokott	7,802	5.3		7,284	4.97	▲3.3
Greens	Klaus Peschel	3,670	2.5	▲0.3	4,730	3.2	▲0.6
50Plus The Generation-Alliance					1,132	0.8	
GRAUEN					1,065	0.7	▲0.3
MLPD					393	0.3	
Informal votes		3,156			2,917		
Total valid votes		146,303			146,542		
Turnout		149,459	74.5	▲1.3			
SPD hold	Majority	13,159	8.9				
