= German Colonial House =

German company (1896–1914)

- Deutsches Kolonialhaus
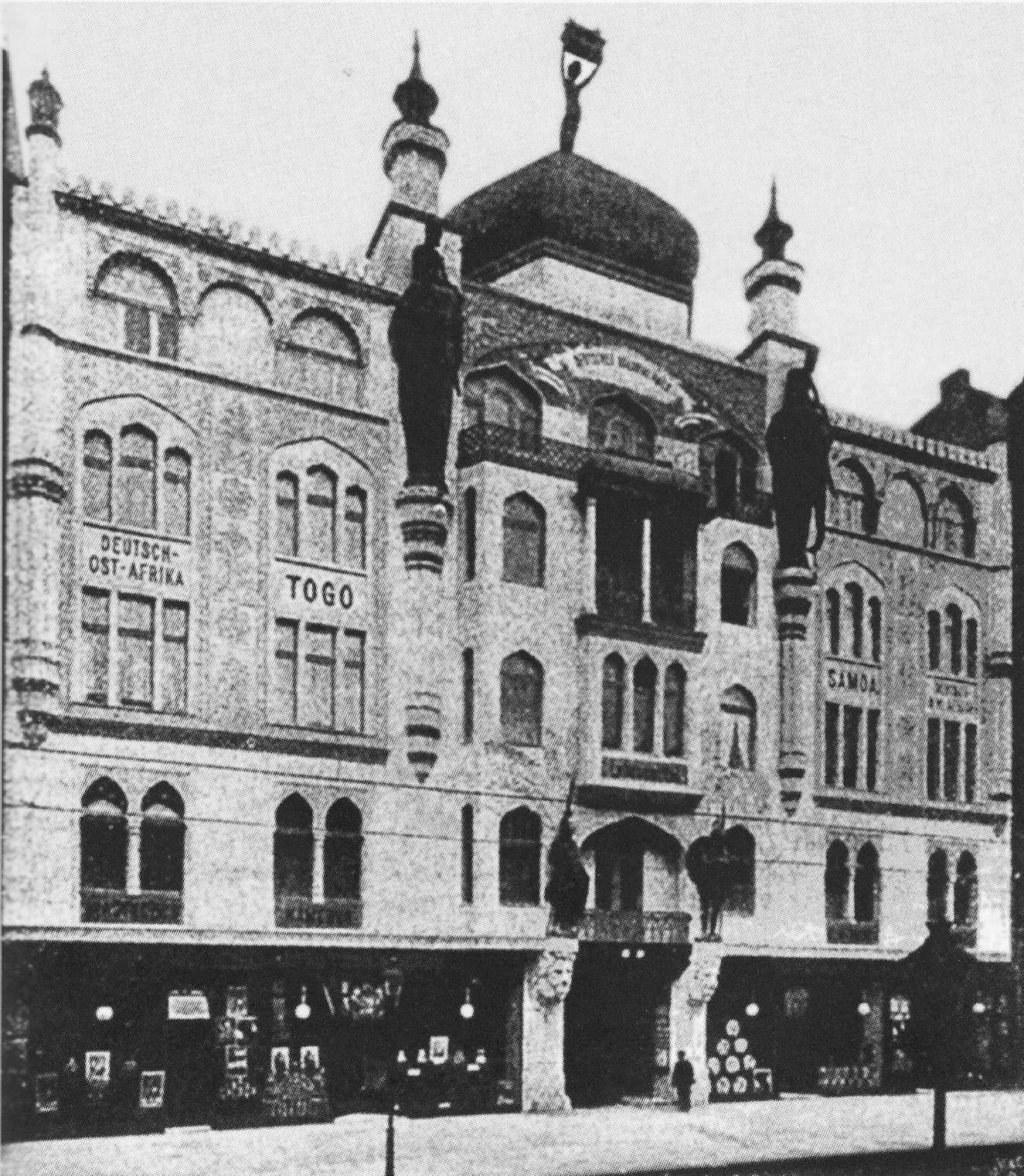
- The German Colonial House (Lützowstraße 89-90)
- Interactive map of the German Colonial House area

General information
- Location: Jerusalemer Strasse 28 (until 1903); Lützowstraße 89-90, Berlin, Germany
- Coordinates: 52°30′11.16″N 13°21′53.64″E
- Opened: 1896
- Closed: 1914
- Demolished: During World War II
- Owner: Bruno Antelmann

The German Colonial House (German: Deutsches Kolonialhaus; 1986–1914) was a German company of the Berlin merchant Bruno Antelmann for products from the German colonies. It had its headquarters at Jerusalemer Strasse 28, but, in 1903, it was moved to Lützowstraße 89–90, Berlin-Tiergarten.

== History ==
In the 1880s, Bruno Antelmann opened a grocery store at Jerusalemer Strasse 28 in the Friedrichswerder neighborhood of Berlin. Soon after the first German colonies were founded, Antelmann specialized in goods from "German cultivation". In 1896, Bruno Antelmann was a leader in the field of colonial goods in Germany and so he ran his own sales stand at the 1st German Colonial Exhibition in Treptow. In 1900, in addition to Berlin, the German Colonial House had branches in Dresden, Frankfurt am Main, Leipzig, Kassel, Munich and Wiesbaden, and there were more than 400 sales outlets in other German cities.

In 1903, the large German Colonial House was built at Lützowstraße 89–90. The architecture was based on colonial motifs: the oriental-looking front with a towering dome was decorated with statues of mounted elephants, lions, African warriors and the names of the German colonies. The execution goes back to Rudolf Hellgrewe, who also enriched the interior with colonial-inspired ceiling paintings. The new building complex housed business and storage rooms in the front building and the rear building, which can be reached via an inner courtyard. The new building had an enormous administrative apparatus, which in turn was divided into the supervisory board, the so-called "expedition department" for organisation of packaging and shipping, and the marketing department or Division for realm-wide advertising.

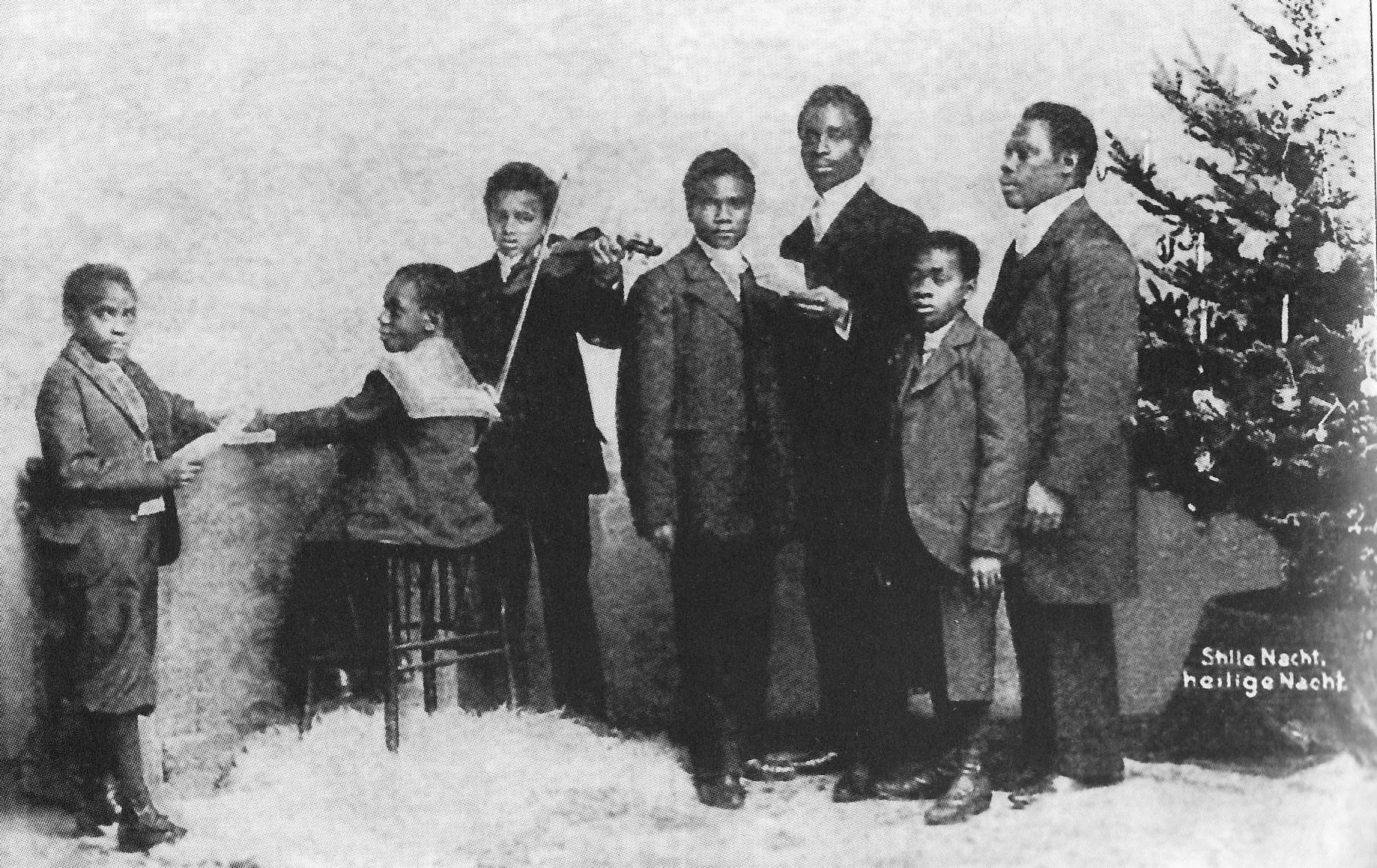
Silent Night, Holy Night, sung by black children and youth: attraction in the colonial Christmas trade

The German Colonial House endeavored "to bring the products of the German protected areas closer to the German public, with reliable checks on their authenticity, and in this way to gradually make the German market more and more independent of the import of foreign colonial products." The operation was under the technical supervision of the German Colonial Society. The range of products ranged from " Usambara coffee", " Samoa cocoa", " Cameroon chocolate" to coconut macaroons, colonial pastries, raw tobacco and "New Guinea cigars" to " Kiautschou cigarettes", " Kola liqueur" and peanut oil. Oriental goods from the allies Ottoman Empire supplemented the offer. But not only food, also ethnographica (carvings and jewellery from Africa), home accessories (e.g. palm bast mats, skins, stuffed African game) and colonial literature were available.

The employees of the German Colonial House often came from the German colonies themselves and were supposed to complete the exotic flair in the sales rooms. "These are the sons of respected, native families, who were mostly recommended by the governors of the individual protected areas to the head of the German Colonial House, Antelmann, for education and professional training."

Kaiser Wilhelm II and Grand Duke Friedrich Franz IV of Mecklenburg-Schwerin were also infected by the exoticism of the German colonial house, and Bruno Antelmann was appointed purveyor to the court.

In 1914, Bruno Antelmann sold the German Colonial House to the Woermann company, which used the building as a warehouse until around 1935. During the Second World War, it was destroyed down to the foundation walls. Today there are modern office buildings there. The monumental portal lion figures are now in the art courtyard of the Reinickendorf local history museum.
