= German Colonial Society =

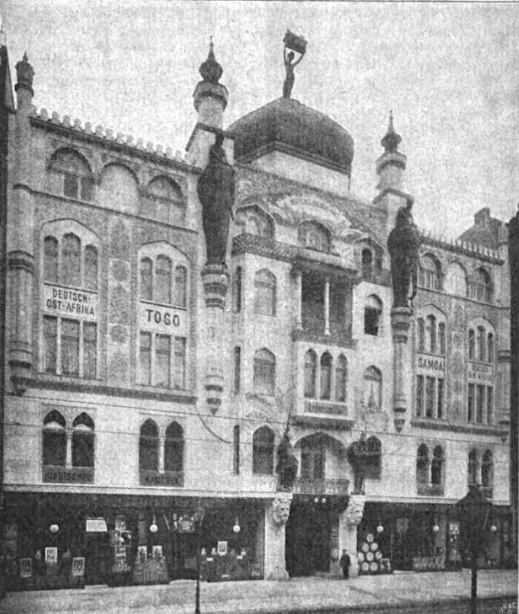
Deutsches Kolonialhaus, headquarters of the society in Berlin, 1903

The German Colonial Society (German: Deutsche Kolonialgesellschaft) (DKG) was a German organisation formed on 19 December 1887 to promote German colonialism. The Society was formed through the merger of the German Colonial Association (Deutscher Kolonialverein; established in 1882 in Frankfurt) and the Society for German Colonization (Gesellschaft für Deutsche Kolonisation; established in 1884). The Society was headquartered in Berlin.

The German Colonial Society worked in close cooperation with the Pan-German League and became influential in the German Empire. Among its leaders were Hermann, Prince of Hohenlohe-Langenburg, Carl Peters and several members of parliament. Upon its formation the Society had approximately 15,000 members and by 1914 the number of members had increased to 42,000. The foremost goal of the Society was to work for a more expansive German colonial policy. From 1916 plans were made for a German colonial empire in Africa, the so-called Deutsch-Mittelafrika, as well as annexations in East Asia. After Germany lost its colonies at the end of the First World War, the Society propagated for their reoccupation.

The society took over the recently founded Deutsches Kolonialmuseum in 1900. Affiliated with the society were the Kolonialwirtschaftliches Komitee (est. 1896), Hauptverband deutscher Flottenvereine im Ausland (est. 1898), and Frauenbund der deutschen Kolonialgesellschaft (est. 1907).

When the Nazi party seized power in Germany, it was decided that a new Society under its direct control was to be created. On 13 June 1936, the German Colonial Society was dissolved and colonial propaganda became the task of the Reichskolonialbund.

== See also ==
- Deutsche Kolonialgesellschaft für Südwestafrika

== Bibliography ==
issued by the society

- Deutsche Kolonialzeitung via HathiTrust

about the society

- Franz Göttlicher: Koloniale Gesellschaften und Verbände (= Findbücher zu Beständen des Bundesarchivs 102), Koblenz 2003
- Ulrich Soénius: Koloniale Begeisterung im Rheinland während des Kaiserreichs, Köln 1992 (Schriften zur rheinisch-westfälischen Wirtschaftsgeschichte, Bd. 37) ISBN 3-933025-30-3

== Images ==
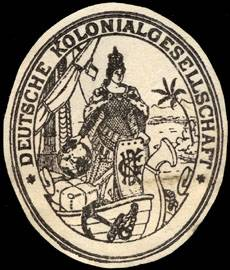
Seal of the Deutsche Kolonialgesellschaft

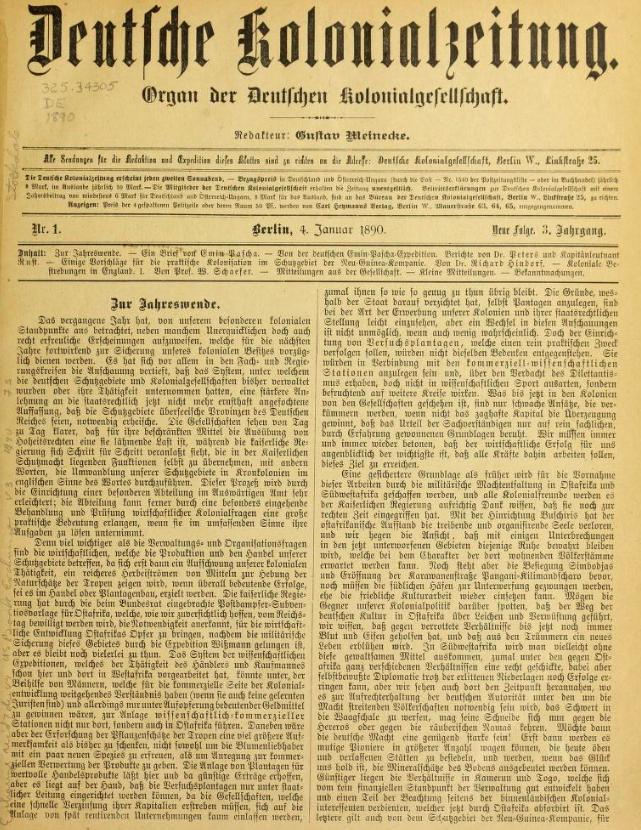
Deutsche Kolonialzeitung (newspaper), 1890, published by the society

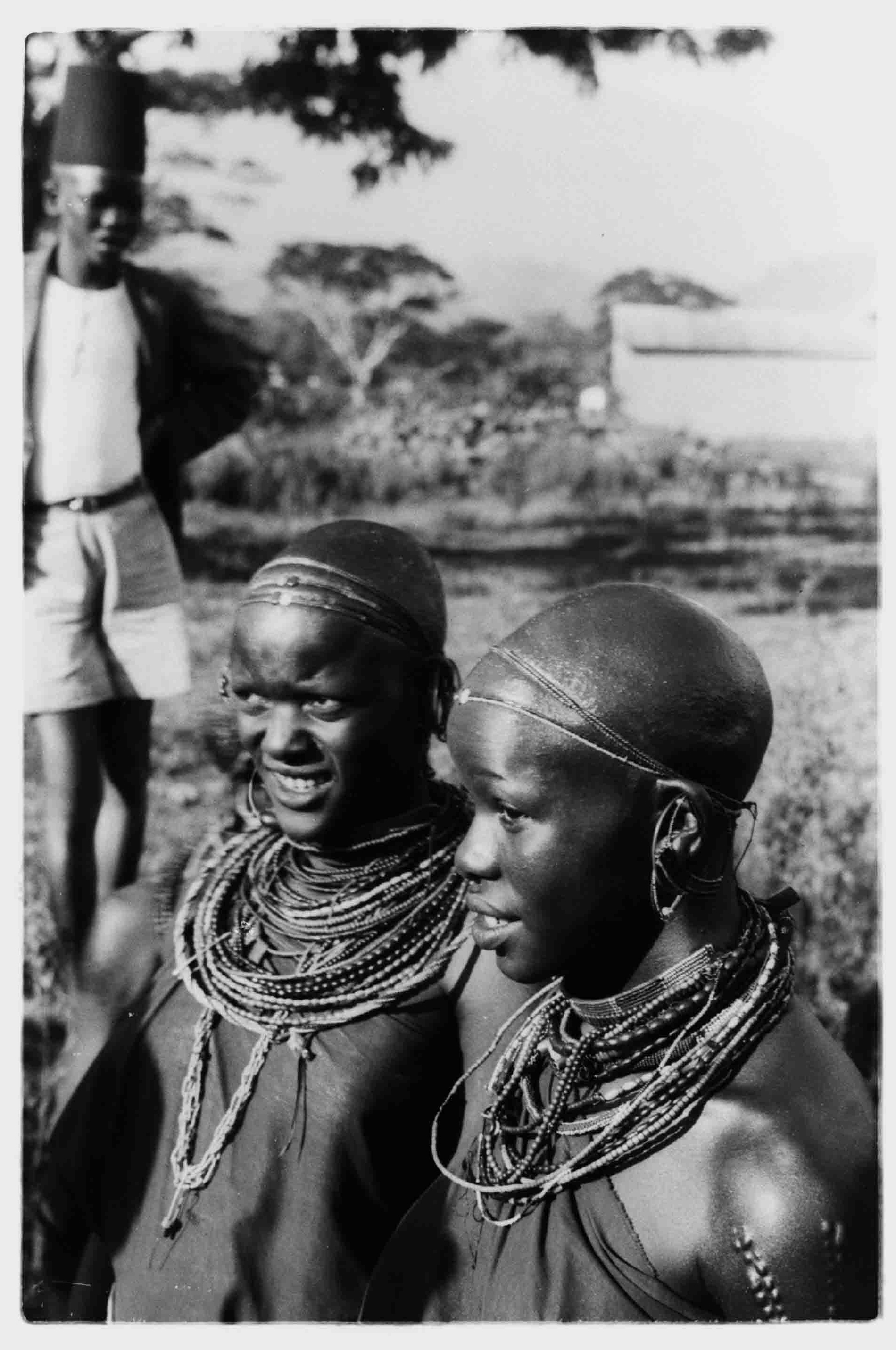
Portrait of Maasai, circa 1900, from Bildarchiv Deutsche Kolonialgesellschaft (photo archive)
