= Hannes Walter (politician) =

German politician (born 1984)

- Walter in 2021

Member of the Bundestag; for Elbe-Elster – Oberspreewald-Lausitz II
- In office 26 October 2021 – 25 March 2025
- Preceded by: Saskia Ludwig
- Succeeded by: Birgit Bessin

Personal details
- Born: 2 March 1984 (age 42) Finsterwalde, East Germany
- Party: Social Democratic
- Education: Berlin School of Economics and Law; Freiberg University of Mining and Technology

Hannes Walter (born 2 March 1984) is a German politician for the SPD. Walter was born in the East German town of Finsterwalde and studied economics in Berlin.

Walter entered the SPD in 2003 and became member of the Bundestag in 2021. In February 2025, Walter lost his seat in Bundestag.
