= Knut Abraham =

German diplomat and politician

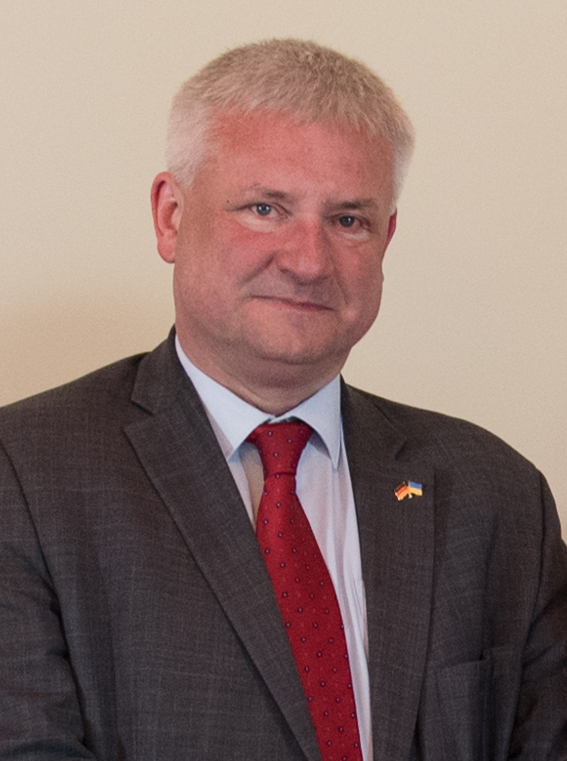

Member of the Bundestag
- Incumbent
- Assumed office 26 October 2021

Personal details
- Born: 4 June 1966 (age 60) Hamburg, West Germany
- Party: Christian Democratic Union
- Education: University of Bonn
- Occupation: Diplomat, jurist

Knut Friedrich Alexander Abraham (born 4 June 1966) is a German diplomat and politician of the Christian Democratic Union (CDU) who has been serving as a Member of the German Bundestag since 2021.

In addition to his parliamentary work, Abraham has been serving as Coordinator of German-Polish Intersocietal and Cross-Border Cooperation at the Federal Foreign Office in the coalition government of Chancellor Friedrich Merz since 2025.

== Early life and education ==
Abraham was born and raised in Hamburg. After graduating from the Hansa-Gymnasium in Bergedorf in 1985, he was a contract soldier in the NATO integrated service in Brunssum until 1987. He then studied law at the Rheinische Friedrich-Wilhelms-Universität Bonn and passed his first state examination in law at the Düsseldorf Higher Regional Court in 1993. After completing his legal clerkship at the Berlin Court of Appeal, he passed his second state examination in law there in 1998.

== Early career ==
From 1987 to 1996 Abraham served as office manager for Otto von Habsburg in Bonn and Berlin. He was also his parliamentary assistant at the European Parliament in Brussels from 1994.

Abraham then attended the Federal Foreign Office's training center and had his first posting at the German Embassy in Helsinki in the summer of 1999, where he passed Career Examination 1. From 2000 to 2003 he was First Secretary of the German Embassy in Sofia. He then moved to the Foreign Office as a consultant in the NATO department until 2005. He then worked as a consultant in the parliamentary and cabinet departments and went to the Federal Chancellery in 2006 as deputy head of the department for global issues.

In 2011 he was appointed Consul-General and Head of the Legal and Consular Department at the German Embassy in Washington. During this time he also regularly visited Jens Soering, a German citizen who had been imprisoned in the United States for many years.

== Political career ==
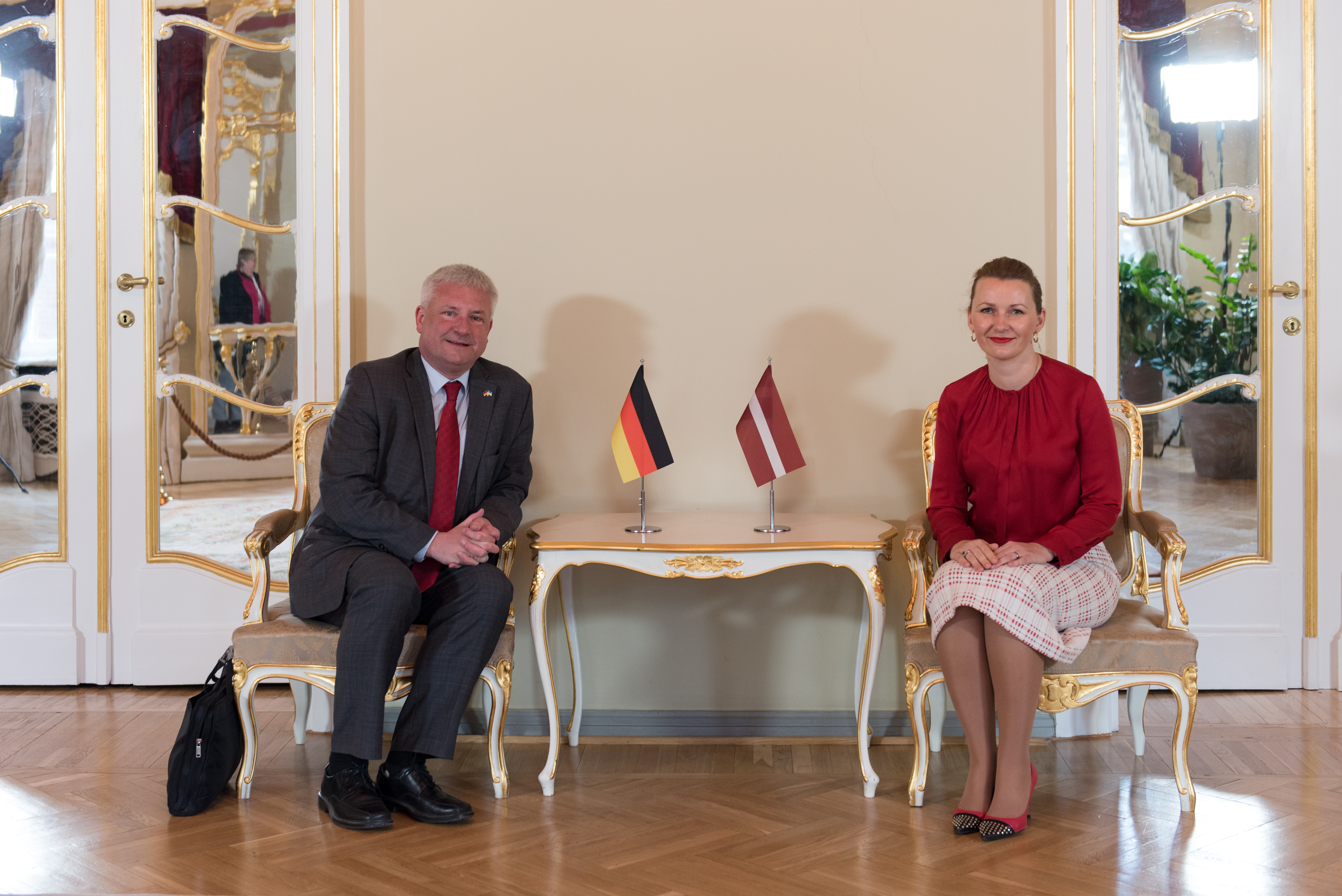
Abraham with Latvian Parliament Speaker Inese Lībiņa-Egnere in 2022

=== Early beginnings ===
Abraham was a member of Young Union before joining the CDU in 1985.

In 2009, 2014 and 2019 Abraham ran unsuccessfully for the European Parliament.

=== Member of the German Parliament, 2021–present ===
In the 2021 German federal election Abraham contested Elbe-Elster – Oberspreewald-Lausitz II, but was elected to the 20th German Bundestag via the state list. In parliament, he has since been serving on the Committee on Foreign Affairs and the Committee on Human Rights and Humanitarian Aid.

In addition to his committee assignments, Abraham is a member of the German delegation to the Parliamentary Assembly of the Council of Europe (PACE). In the Assembly, he serves on the Committee on Legal Affairs and Human Rights.

In the negotiations to form a Grand Coalition under the leadership of Friedrich Merz's Christian Democrats (CDU together with the Bavarian CSU) and the SPD following the 2025 German elections, Abraham was part of the CDU/CSU delegation in the working group on European affairs, led by Patricia Lips, Alexander Radwan and Katarina Barley.

== Other activities ==
- European Council on Foreign Relations (ECFR), Member (since 2025)

== Personal life ==
Abraham lives in Schönewalde, in the district of Dubro. He has five children and has been married to his wife Marion since 1996. He is of Evangelical Lutheran denomination.
