= Martin Neumann =

German politician (born 1956)

Martin Neumann MdB a.D.
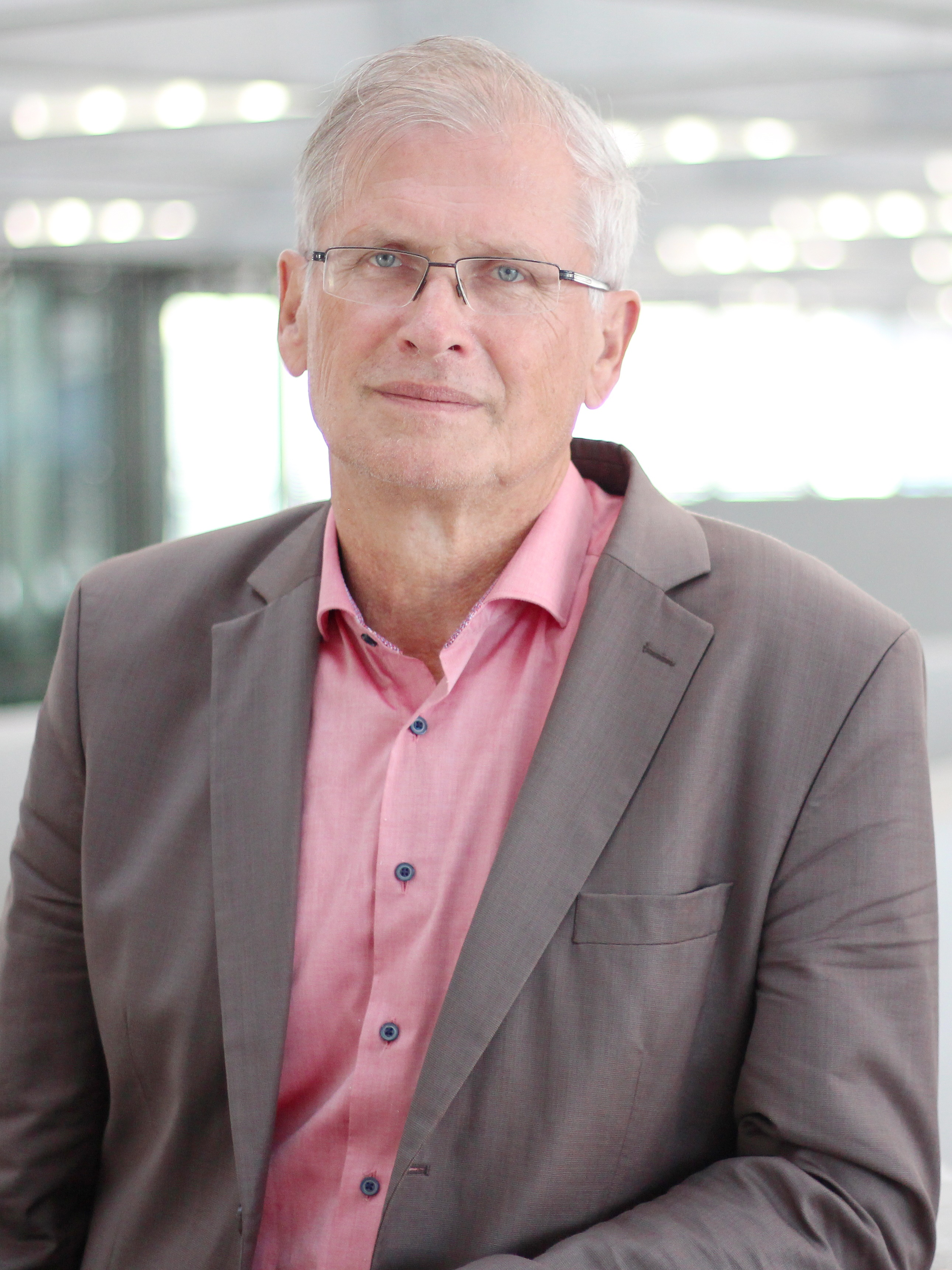
- Neumann in 2019

Member of the Bundestag for Brandenburg
- In office 24 October 2017 – 26 October 2021
- Preceded by: Himself (2013)
- Succeeded by: Friedhelm Boginski
- Constituency: Free Democratic Party List
- In office 27 October 2009 – 22 October 2013
- Preceded by: multi-member district
- Succeeded by: Himself (2017)
- Constituency: Free Democratic Party List

Member of the Landtag of Brandenburg
- In office 26 October 1990 – 11 October 1994
- Preceded by: Constituency established
- Succeeded by: multi-member district
- Constituency: Free Democratic Party List

Personal details
- Born: 27 January 1956 (age 70) Vetschau, East Germany (now Germany)
- Party: FDP
- Children: 2
- Education: Technical University of Dresden
- Occupation: Politician; academic
- Website: Bundestag website

Martin Neumann (born 27 January 1956) is a German politician of the Free Democratic Party (FDP) who served as a member of the Bundestag from the state of Brandenburg from 2009 until 2013 and again from 2017 until 2021.

== Early life and career ==
Neumann was born in Vetschau, Brandenburg. After studying technical building equipment at the Technical University of Dresden, he was awarded a doctorate in 1987 as Dr.-Ing. at the Cottbus University of Engineering after successfully defending his dissertation on the subject of investigating the thermal insulation behaviour of heavy ventilated exterior wall structures.

From 1987 to 1990, Neumann worked as the urban planning director in Lübbenau. Since 1995, Neumann has been a sworn expert for building services, heat, cold and noise insulation. From 1997 to 1999, Neumann was a lecturer for supply engineering and technical building equipment at the Lausitz University of Applied Sciences and the University of Applied Sciences Magdeburg-Stendal. In 1999, he accepted a call to the University of Applied Sciences Magdeburg-Stendal as professor for technical building services. He is also an energy consultant for the consumer advice centre.

== Political career ==
Neumann first served on the Bundestag from 2009 until 2013. In parliament, he was a member of the Committee for Education, Research and Technology Assessment.

Neumann became a member of the Bundestag again in the 2017 German federal election. He was a member of the Committee for Economic Affairs and Energy and served as his parliamentary group's spokesman for energy policy.

He lost his seat in the 2021 German federal election.

== Other activities ==
- Federal Network Agency for Electricity, Gas, Telecommunications, Post and Railway (BNetzA), Alternate Member of the Advisory Board (2018–2021)
- German Industry Initiative for Energy Efficiency (DENEFF), Member of the Parliamentary Advisory Board (2018–2021)
