= Ricarda Budke =

German politician (born 1999)

Member of the Landtag of Brandenburg
- In office 7 January 2020 – 17 October 2024
- Preceded by: Axel Vogel

Personal details
- Born: 23 February 1999 (age 27)
- Party: Alliance 90/The Greens
- Parent: Petra Budke (mother)

Ricarda Budke (born 23 February 1999) is a German politician. From 2020 to 2024, she was a member of the Landtag of Brandenburg. She took office as the youngest member of the Landtag. From 2017 to 2019, she served as co-spokesperson of the Green Youth in Brandenburg. She is the daughter of Petra Budke.
