= Otto Wilhelm Thomé =

German botanist and botanical artist (1840–1925)

Otto Wilhelm Thomé (1840–1925) was a German botanist and botanical artist from Cologne, best known for his compendium of botanical illustrations Flora von Deutschland, Österreich und der Schweiz in Wort und Bild für Schule und Haus (Flora of Germany, Austria and Switzerland in Word and Picture for School and Home), the first of 4 volumes with a total of 572 botanical illustrations, published in 1885 in Gera, Germany. Another 8 volumes were added to the set by Walter Migula with the republication in 1903. From 1897 to 1899, he was the Headmaster of the Business School Cologne.

== Illustrations by Thomé ==
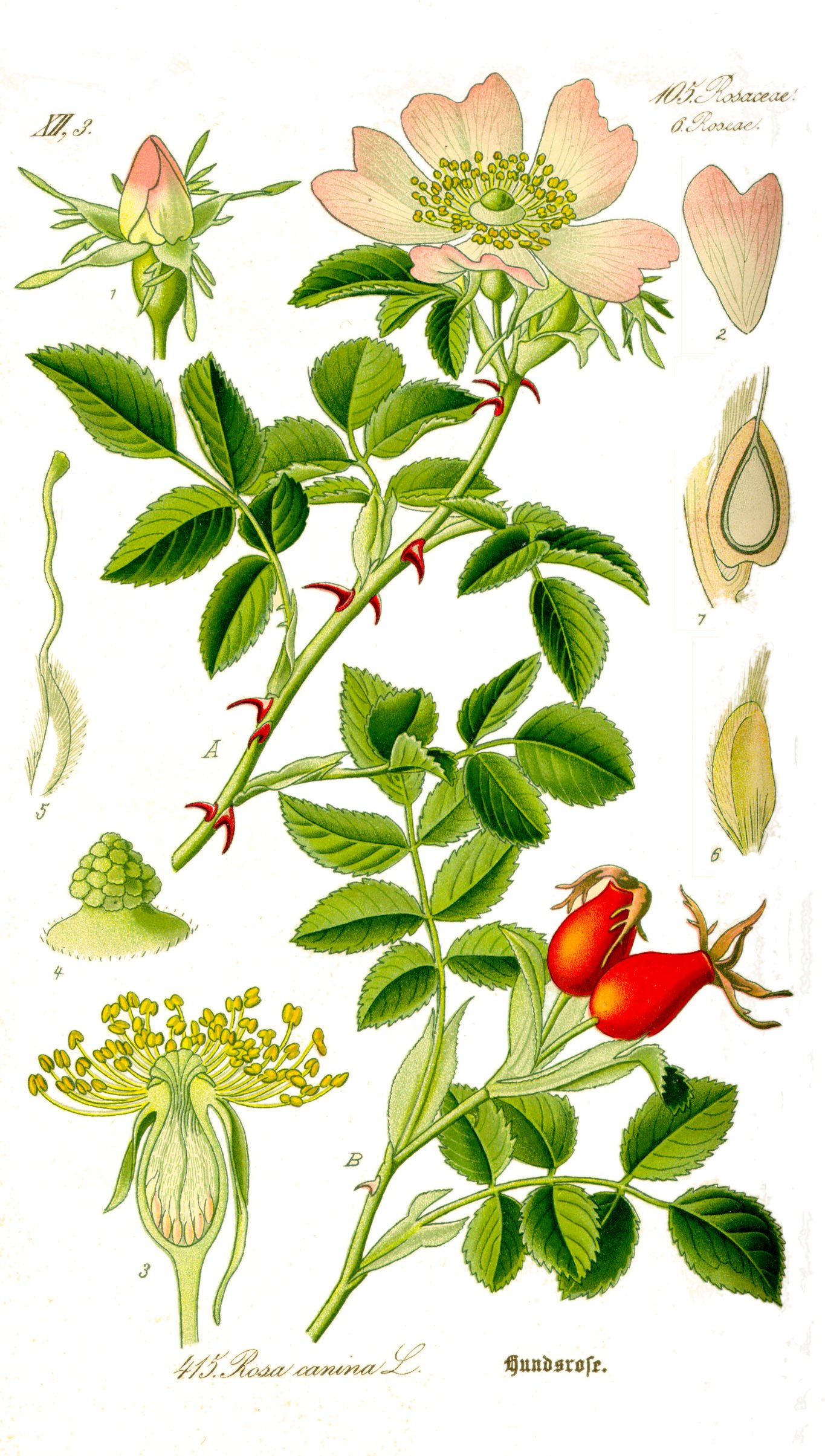
Rosa canina L.

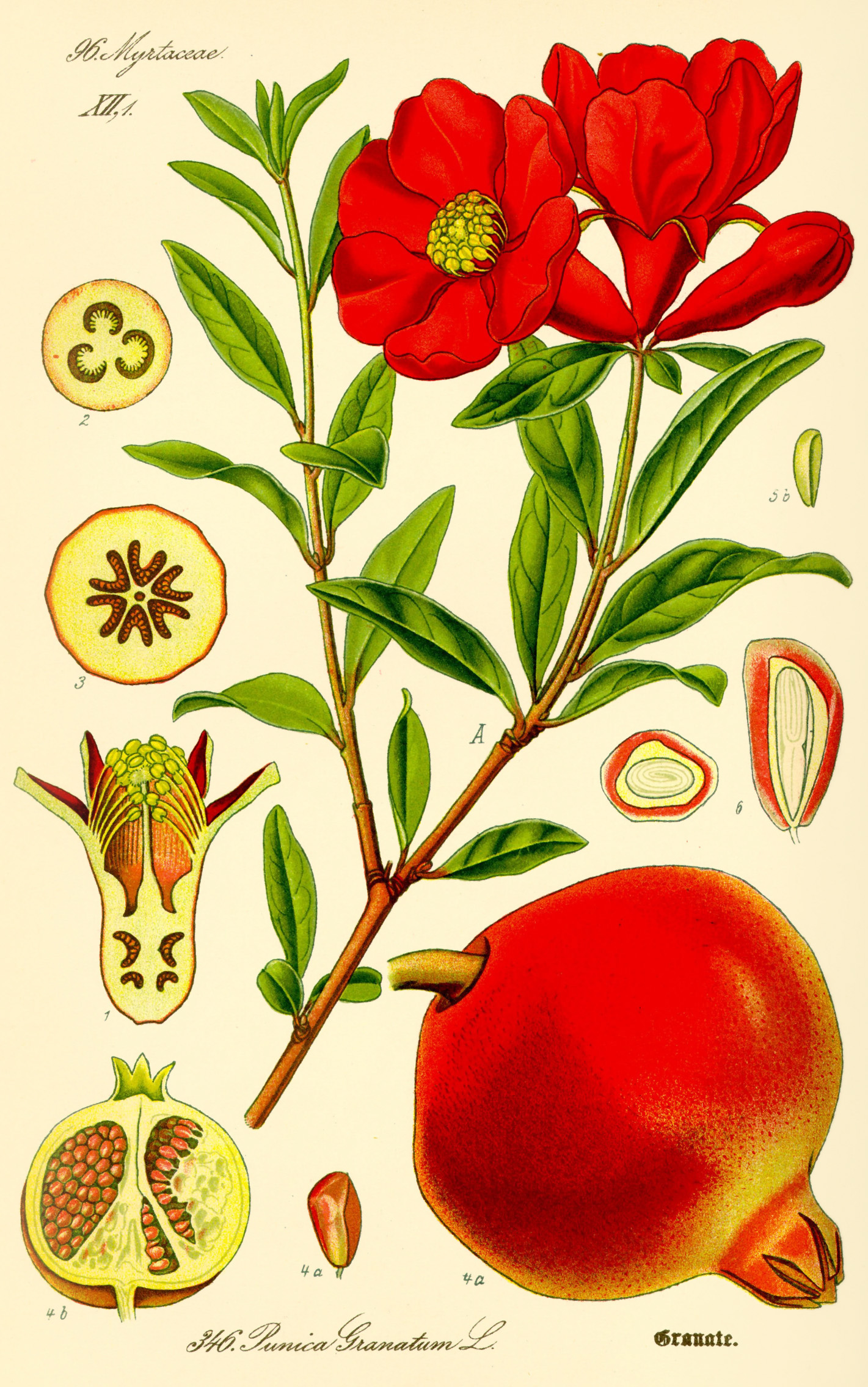
Punica granatum L.

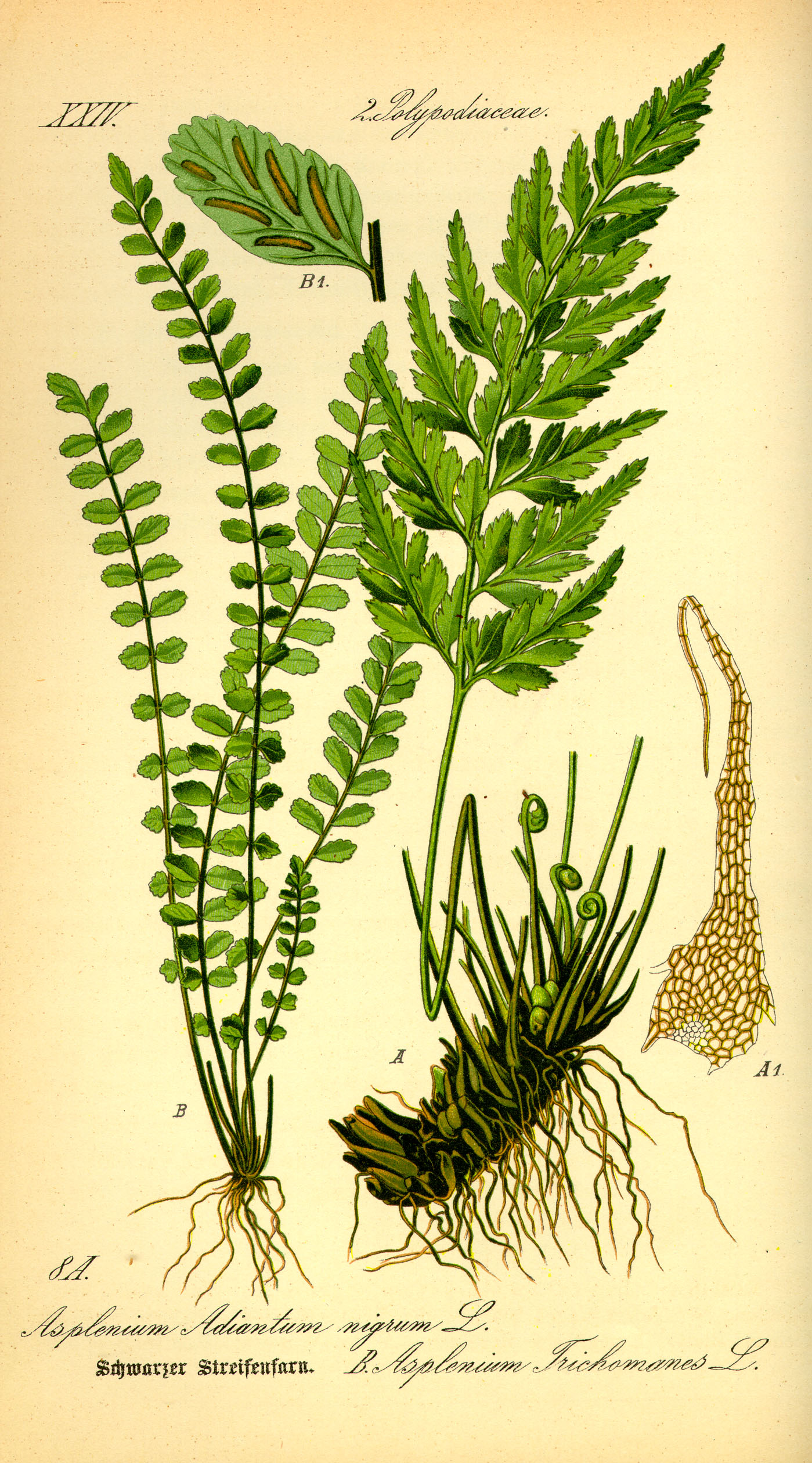
Asplenium trichomanes

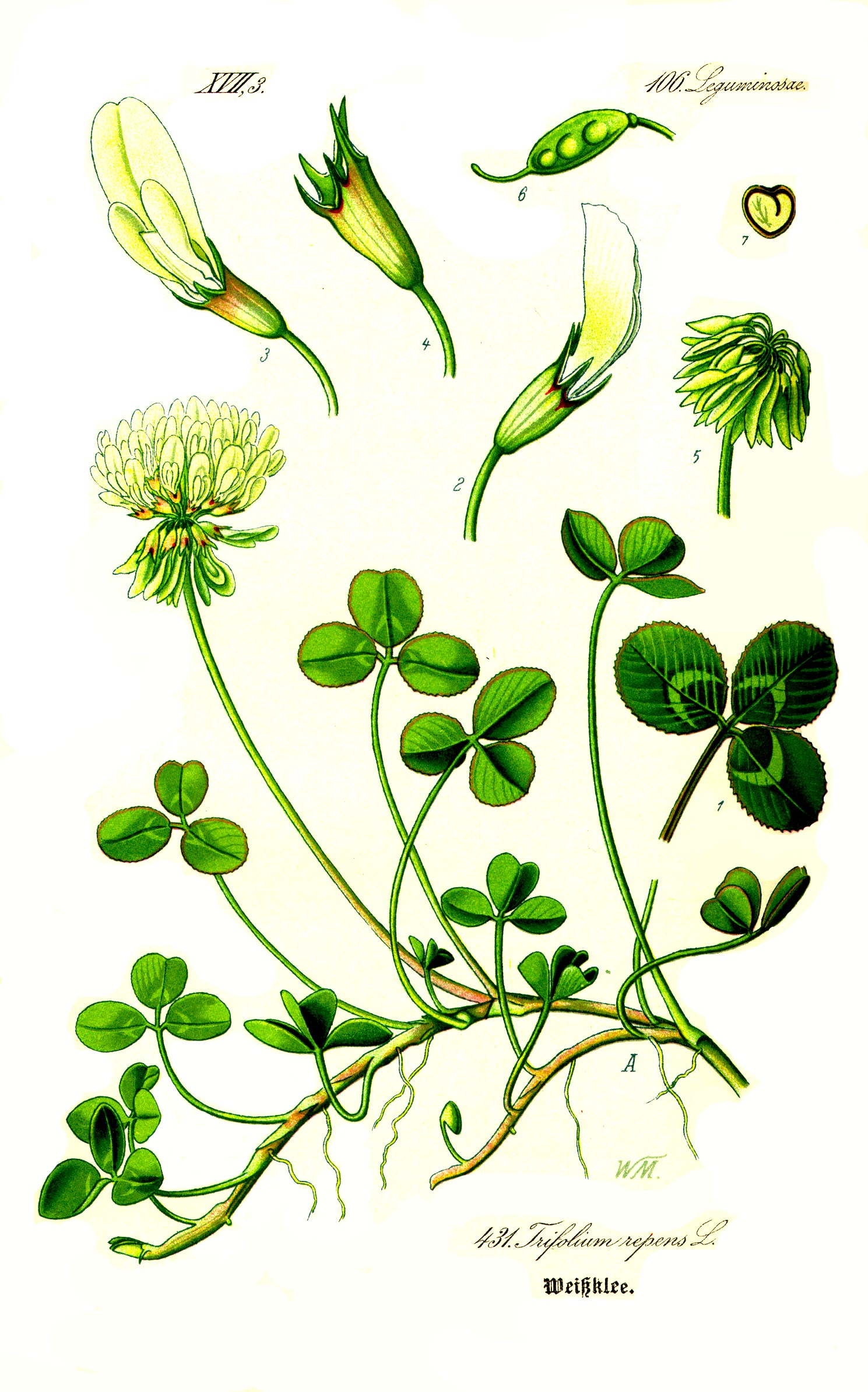
Trifolium repens L.
