= German Colonial Museum =

German museum (1899–1915)

- Deutsches Kolonialmuseum
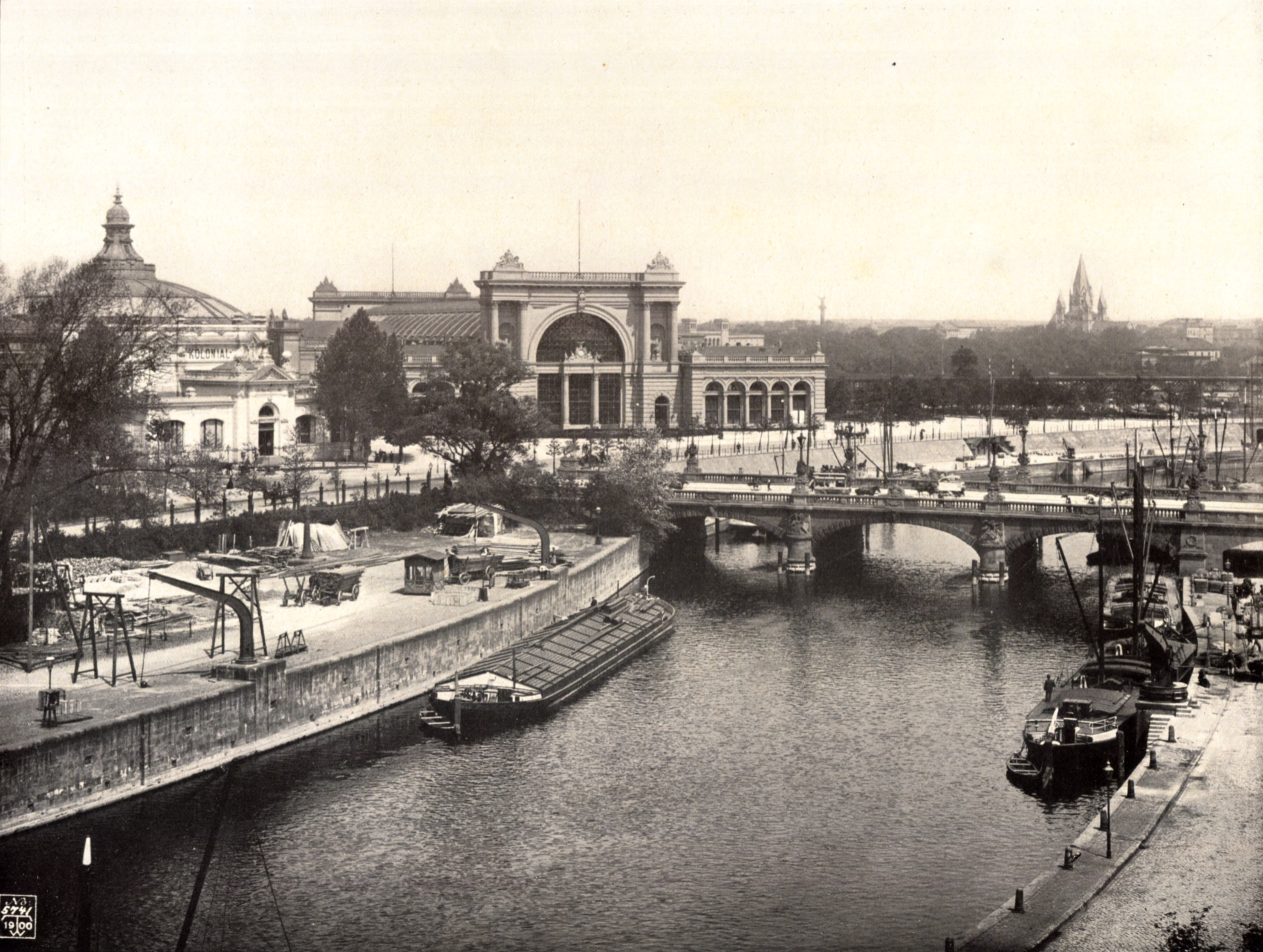
- German Colonial Museum (left) next to Lehrter Bahnhof in Berlin, 1900

General information
- Type: Museum
- Location: Rahel-Hirsch-Straße 10, 10557 Berlin, Germany
- Coordinates: 52°31′21″N 13°22′5.16″E
- Opened: 13 October 1899
- Closed: 1915

The German Colonial Museum (German: Deutsches Kolonialmuseum; 1899 - 1915) was a museum in the Berlin district of Moabit that existed from 1899 to 1915. The museum aimed to inform the German public about the German colonies overseas. Its collection consisted of more than 70,000 artifacts, and it attracted a significant number of visitors, with around 481,259 visitors between 1899 and 1911.

The museum's exhibits covered various aspects of the colonies, including their missionary work, trade, literature, history, culture, and everyday life. There was also a particular focus on promoting colonial products for the German domestic market. In addition to its main function as a museum, the Deutsches Kolonialmuseum also played a propagandistic role in promoting German colonialism. The museum was designed by colonial enthusiasts and aimed to legitimise and glorify German colonial expansion.

Although the German Colonial Museum was closed in 1915, its legacy can still be seen in the collections of the German Historical Museum (German: Deutsches Historisches Museum). Furthermore, in Bremen, there exists a museum that was originally named Deutsches Kolonialmuseum but was renamed German Oversea museum (German: Deutsches Überseemuseum) after World War II.

== History ==
In the autumn of 1896, the Berlin trade exhibition closed, at which in the attached "German Colonial Exhibition” was intended to arouse interest in the German colonies among the Berlin public. After the successful conclusion of the exhibition, the question arose as to what should happen to the objects that had been painstakingly assembled. The organisers decided to let the collection of raw products from the German colonies and products made from them remain together after the end of the exhibition and to make them the basis of a colonial museum. From the outset, the aim of the museum was less a scientific approach than a propagandistic one, intended to arouse interest in the German colonies among the population. For this purpose, the most modern exhibition techniques such as photographs, panorama presentations and the reproduction of "realistic" scenes were used.

With the support of Adolph von Hansemann and the support of the Colonial Department of the Foreign Office, Kaiser Wilhelm II was able to open the German Colonial Museum on 13 October 1899 in the building of the former Naval Panorama.

=== Structure of the exhibition ===
The tour of the Colonial Museum began in a representative entrance area, where a bust of Wilhelm II with the title The patron of our colonies was the eye-catcher. The first exhibition room was the Import Hall, followed by the Export Hall. First, the import hall provided information about the products that were shipped from the German colonies to the Reich, e.g., rubber, cocoa, tropical woods or precious stones. In the export hall, products were exhibited that German companies exported to the colonies, such as fertilizers, tropical medicine, wire and machines. According to the original plans, an export sample warehouse was to be developed from these rooms by 1920. The main attraction was the replica of East Africa's Rufiji river valley in the center of the large domed building, illustrated by a flowing watercourse that visitors crossed over boulders. On the ground floor there was a reading hall where one could take a look at the colonial literature and newspapers from the colonies. In other rooms, Protestant and Catholic missions presented their work.

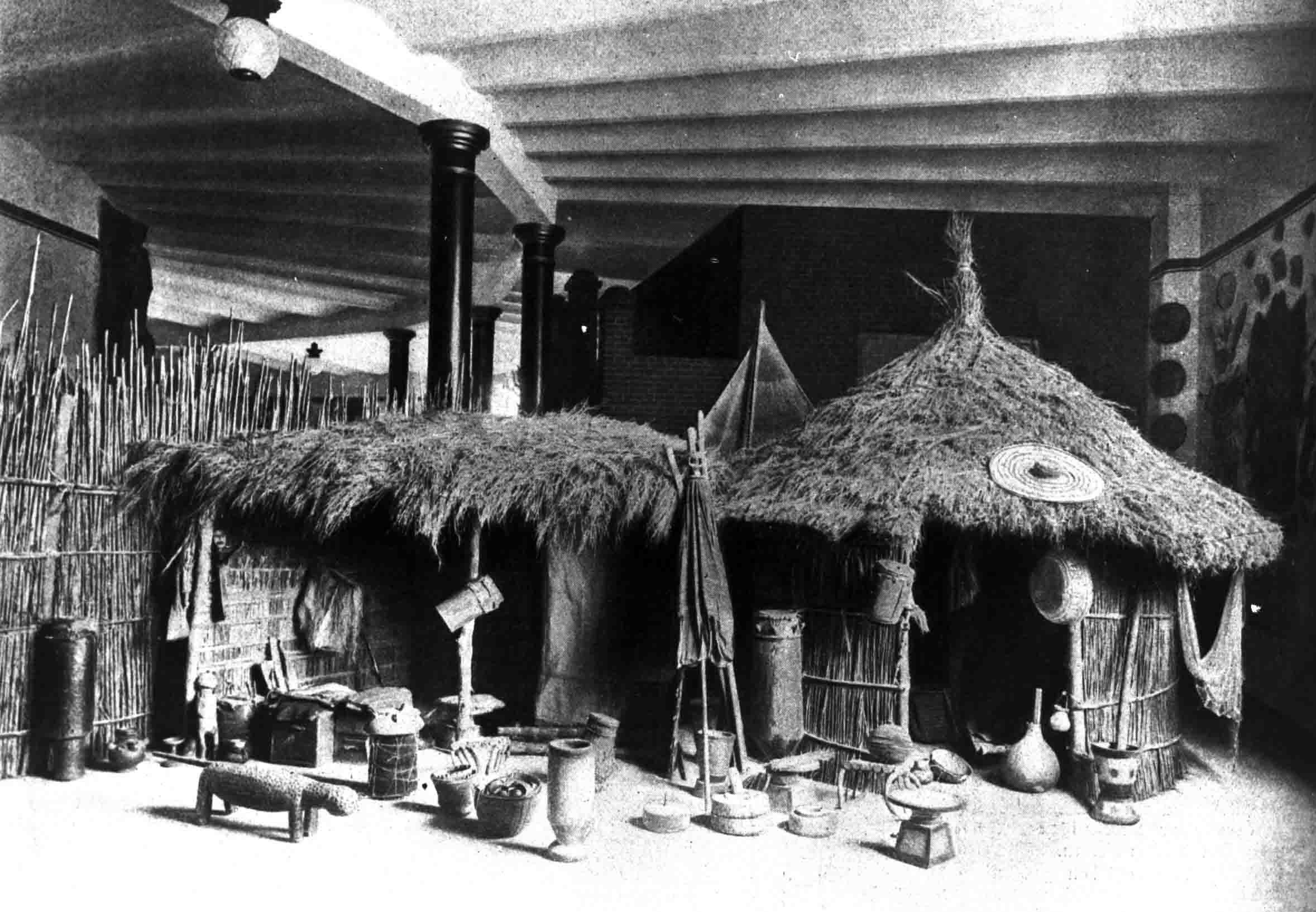
Huts from Togo in the German Colonial Museum

The other museum departments were Hygiene and areas of Geography, History, Statistics and Colonial life, which were divided into individual so-called "protected areas". In the German-Cameroon department, one could enter the replica of a verandah of a non-commissioned officers' mess, which offered a panoramic view of the Atlantic from Douala. In the Togo department, one could visit huts that were true to the original, and a Herero camp was found near German South West Africa. Kiautschou was through Chinese street life and a view of the bay with naval ships are represented. The area German New Guinea offered u. a coastal panorama, huts or houses on stilts with all kinds of utensils and boats typical of the region including fishing rods and nets.

Many individual pieces supplemented the respective departments. Among them were booty from the colonies (e.g. the Hendrik Witbooi's chair) and colonial memorabilia, such as the flag that Adolf Lüderitz once hoisted at Angra Pequena. In addition to these historical objects, stuffed animals, photographs or relief maps of the cities of Swakopmund, Dar es Salaam and Neu-Langenburg illustrated the facets of the colonial regions.

The German Colonial House ran a café in the Colonial Museum, where food from overseas was served.

=== Further development ===
In 1900, the joint-stock company "German Colonial Museum" under the chairman of the supervisory board, Hans Lothar von Schweinitz, fell into the hands of the German Colonial Society, which from then on made all decisions until the museum was closed. As early as 1906, the Colonial Museum hit the headlines for the first time. The entrance fees did not fully cover the operating costs and it was decided that the Colonial Museum would receive money from the funds of the Ethnological Museum. Its director Felix von Luschan wrote in 1906:

"I didn't particularly calculate [...] the Colonial Museum that now exists at Lehrter Bahnhof. In accordance with an alleged wish of His Majesty the Emperor, this is initially only to be retained for schools etc. and must be affiliated with the Royal Museum of Ethnology [...] for a variety of reasons. I think that this museum, as a colonial panorama, could somehow be placed in a corner of our new building in such a way that it doesn’t disrupt our other operations.”

The aforesaid merger never took place. In 1911, the German Colonial Newspaper reported that 481,259 visitors had visited the museum and 2,931 lectures had been given since it opened in 1899. It remains unclear how successful the museum was with the general public. The German Colonial Museum was closed in 1915 for financial reasons.

Parts of the holdings, a total of 3,342 objects, were sold to the Linden Museum in Stuttgart in 1917. The remaining, almost 70,000 exhibits were probably stored in the archive of the Ethnological Museum during the Weimar Republic and exported to the Soviet Union as looted art in the Second World War. Although the German Colonial Museum was closed in 1915, its legacy can still be seen in the collections of the German Historical Museum (German: Deutsches Historisches Museum). The Skull of Sultan Mkwawa was returned to Tanzania in 1954.
