= Hansagymnasium Köln =

Gymnasium school in Cologne, Germany

Coordinates: 50.9481°N 6.9507°E

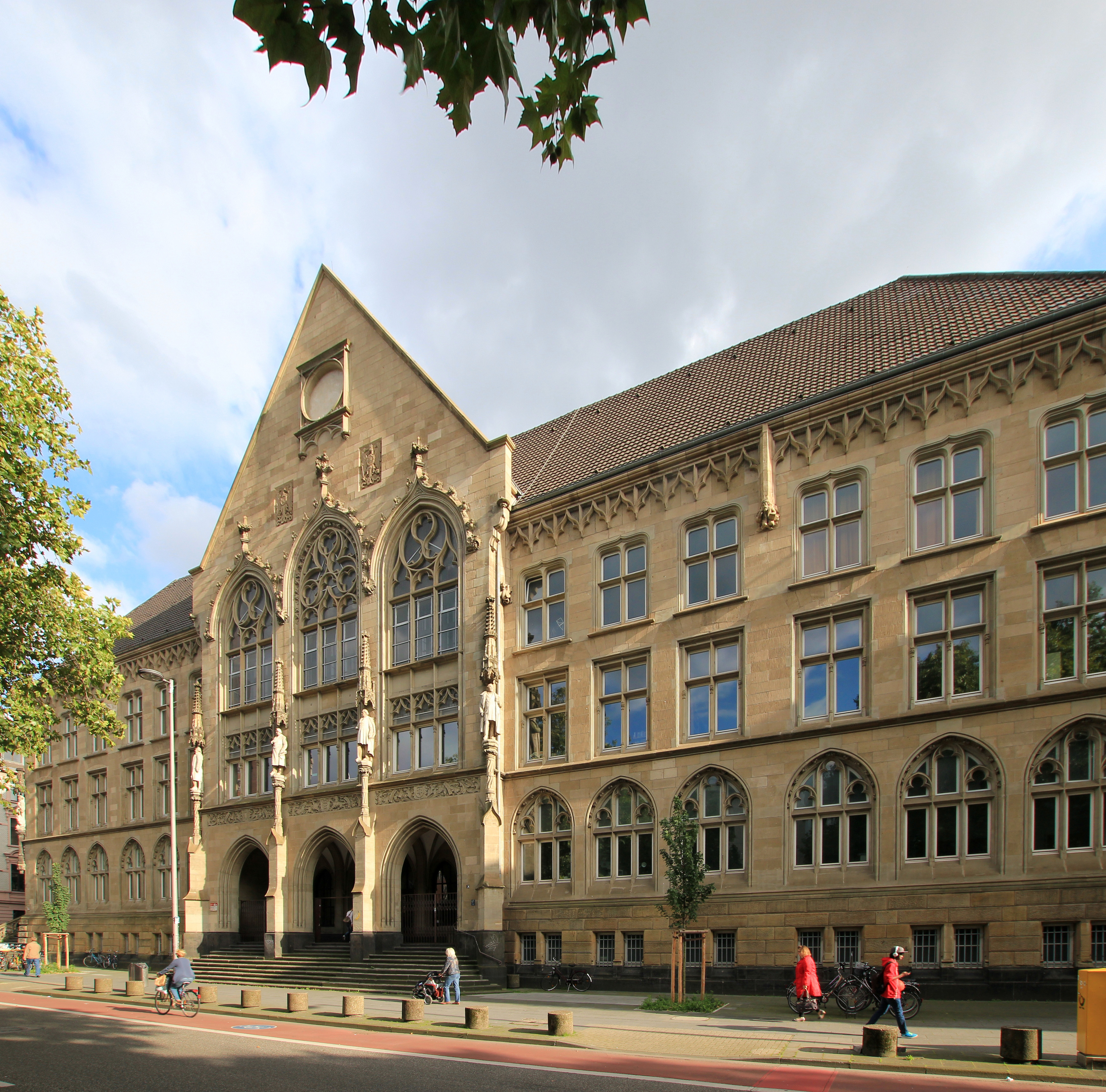

Location
- Cologne, North Rhine-Westphalia, Germany

Information
- Type: Gymnasium
- Established: 1899
- Principal: Erika Nausester-Hahn
- Website: www.hansa-gymnasium-koeln.de

Hansagymnasium Köln is a Gymnasium in Cologne, Germany and has about 800 pupils.

The school was founded in 1899 as a business school. Until 1941 its name was Oberrealschule am Hansaring.

== Notable former pupils and staff ==
=== Pupils ===
- Norbert Burger (1932 - 2012) - Mayor of Cologne 1980 - 1999
- Henryk M. Broder (born 1946) - author and journalist
- Hans Wilhelm Schlegel (born 1951) - astronaut
- Tillmann Otto (born 1974) - musician

=== Staff ===
- Martin Brand (born 1975) - visual artist
- Kurt Holl (born 1938) - civil rights activist
- Henner Huhle (born 1937) - gymnast

=== Headmasters ===
- 1897–1899 Prof. Dr. Otto Wilhelm Thomé
- 1899–1903 Dr. Johannes Vogels
- 1903–1922 Dr. Konrad Cüppers
- 1923–1931 Dr. Paul Holzapfel
- 1931–1933 Wilhelm Steinforth
- 1935–1945 Dr. Johannes Becker (provisionally since 1934)
- 1961-1974 Adolf Kagel
- 1975-1992 Dr. Gisbert Gemein
- 1992–2002 Eckhard Wieberneit
- 2003–2012 Horst Kahl
- 2012-2015 Norbert Subroweit
- 2015-2016 Ulrike Thiede (provisionally)
- 2016-2017 Niels Menge (provisionally)
- since 2017 Erika Nausester-Hahn
