= Canan Bayram =

German lawyer & politician (born 1966)

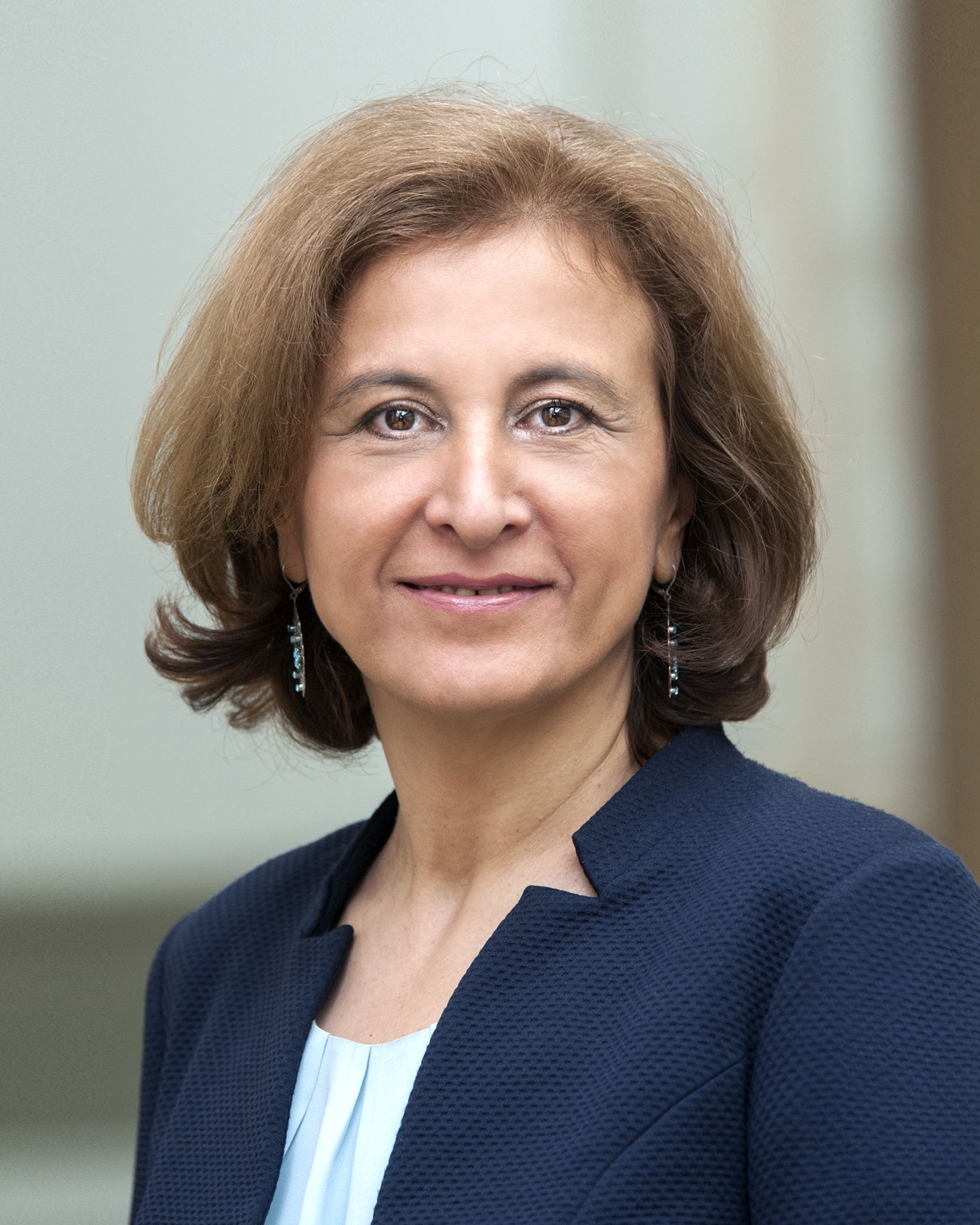

Member of the Bundestag; for Berlin-Friedrichshain-Kreuzberg – Prenzlauer Berg East
- In office 24 October 2017 – 25 March 2025
- Preceded by: Hans-Christian Ströbele
- Succeeded by: Pascal Meiser

Member of the; Berlin House of Representatives; for Friedrichshain-Kreuzberg 5
- In office October 2006 – 31 December 2017
- Preceded by: Frederik Over
- Succeeded by: Daniela Billig

Personal details
- Born: 11 February 1966 (age 60) Malatya, Turkey
- Citizenship: German
- Party: Alliance 90/The Greens (since 2009)
- Other political affiliations: SDP (1999–2009)
- Children: 1
- Education: University of Bonn

Canan Bayram (born 11 February 1966) is a German lawyer and politician (Alliance 90/The Greens) who has served as a member of the German Parliament (Bundestag) since 2017. She was a member of the House of Representatives of Berlin from 2006 to 2017, when she was directly elected to the Berlin-Friedrichshain-Kreuzberg – Prenzlauer Berg East electoral district in the 2017 federal election. From 2017 until 2021, she was the only Alliance 90/Green member of parliament to hold a direct mandate rather than being elected from the party list. Bayram decided against running for office in the 2025 federal election because she lost confidence in the party's self-image and positions.

== Early life ==
Bayram was born in Malatya, Turkey and is of Kurdish descent., She grew up in Germany in Nettetal and Brüggen. Later, she completed high school in Bonn and studied politics and law at the University of Bonn and passed her first law state exam.

== Early career ==
After an internship and passing her second law state exam, Bayram worked as a jurist in various federal ministries. Since 2003, she has been a lawyer in Berlin-Friedrichshain with a focus on labour law and family law.

== Political career ==
=== Career in state politics ===
Bayram started her political career by joining the Social Democratic Party in 1999. In 2006 she was elected to the House of Representatives of Berlin in the district of Berlin-Friedrichshain, winning 28% of the vote in the district. She was a spokesperson for the SPD parliamentary caucus and a member of the Committee on Constitutional Affairs, Home Affairs, Security and Order, as well as the Committee on Economic Affairs, Technology and Women. In May 2009, she defected from the SPD and joined the Alliance 90/The Greens in the House of Representatives of Berlin.

Bayram was re-elected in the 2011 and 2016 Berlin elections in the district of Friedrichshain-Kreuzberg 5. She was the spokesperson for migration, integration and refugee policy as well as spokesperson for legal policy in the party. She was also a member of the Committee for Integration, Labor, Vocational Training and Social Affairs as well as the Committee on Home Affairs, Security and Order and the Committee on Legal Affairs, Constitutional Affairs, Consumer Protection and Anti-Discrimination. Her political priorities were labor market policy, family policy, and domestic and legal policy.

=== Member of Parliament (2017–2025) ===
On 28 February 2017, Bayram announced her candidacy to succeed federal Alliance 90/The Greens member of Bundestag Hans-Christian Ströbele. At a constituency meeting on 11 March 2017, she was nominated as the Green candidate for the Berlin-Friedrichshain-Kreuzberg – Prenzlauer Berg East electoral district for the 2017 German federal election. During the federal Alliance 90/The Greens convention in Berlin from 16 to 18 June 2017, Bayram was introduced to a wider national audience. In an introductory speech, Bayram sharply criticized the party's lead candidates Katrin Göring-Eckardt and Cem Özdemir.

In the September federal election, Bayram was directly elected to the Berlin-Friedrichshain-Kreuzberg – Prenzlauer Berg East electoral district with 26.3% of the vote. As with her predecessor in the district, Ströbele, Bayram was the only Alliance 90/The Greens member of Bundestag to be directly elected and not from the party list.

In parliament, Bayram was a member of the Committee on Legal Affairs and Consumer Protection. In addition, she served on the parliamentary body in charge of appointing judges to the Highest Courts of Justice, namely the Federal Court of Justice (BGH), the Federal Administrative Court (BVerwG), the Federal Fiscal Court (BFH), the Federal Labour Court (BAG), and the Federal Social Court (BSG).

In addition to her committee assignments, Bayram served as deputy chairwoman of the Parliamentary Friendship Group for Relations with the Maghreb States. From 2022, she was also part of the German delegation to the Parliamentary Assembly of the Organization for Security and Co-operation in Europe.

In October 2024, Bayram announced that she would not stand in the 2025 federal elections but instead resign from national politics by the end of the parliamentary term. Bayram decided against running for office in the 2025 federal election out of dissatisfaction with her party's course. She decided against running, "among other things because it is becoming less and less clear to me what the Alliance 90/The Greens party actually stands for. ...In this respect, I can no longer explain to people what we stand for or whether they can trust us" she wrote.

In March 2025, Bayram was the only Green in the Bundestag to vote against Friedrich Merz's constitutional amendment to increase military spending.

== Political stances ==
After a conflict on Berlin's Riga Street, Bayram criticized the Berlin Police after residents had complained about the massive police presence. She was criticized in part by her own party for her statement that "the [police] harassed local residents".

Bayram advocates the rights of tenants and criticizes international real estate funds that she feels are only interested in return on investment.

Following the 2017 national elections, Bayram argued that "a Jamaica coalition would be seen as a West German coalition in the east," noting the losses all three parties – the Christian Democratic Union/Christian Social Union (CDU/CSU), Free Democratic Party (FDP), and the Green Party – had suffered in the East.
