= Halina Wawzyniak =

German politician

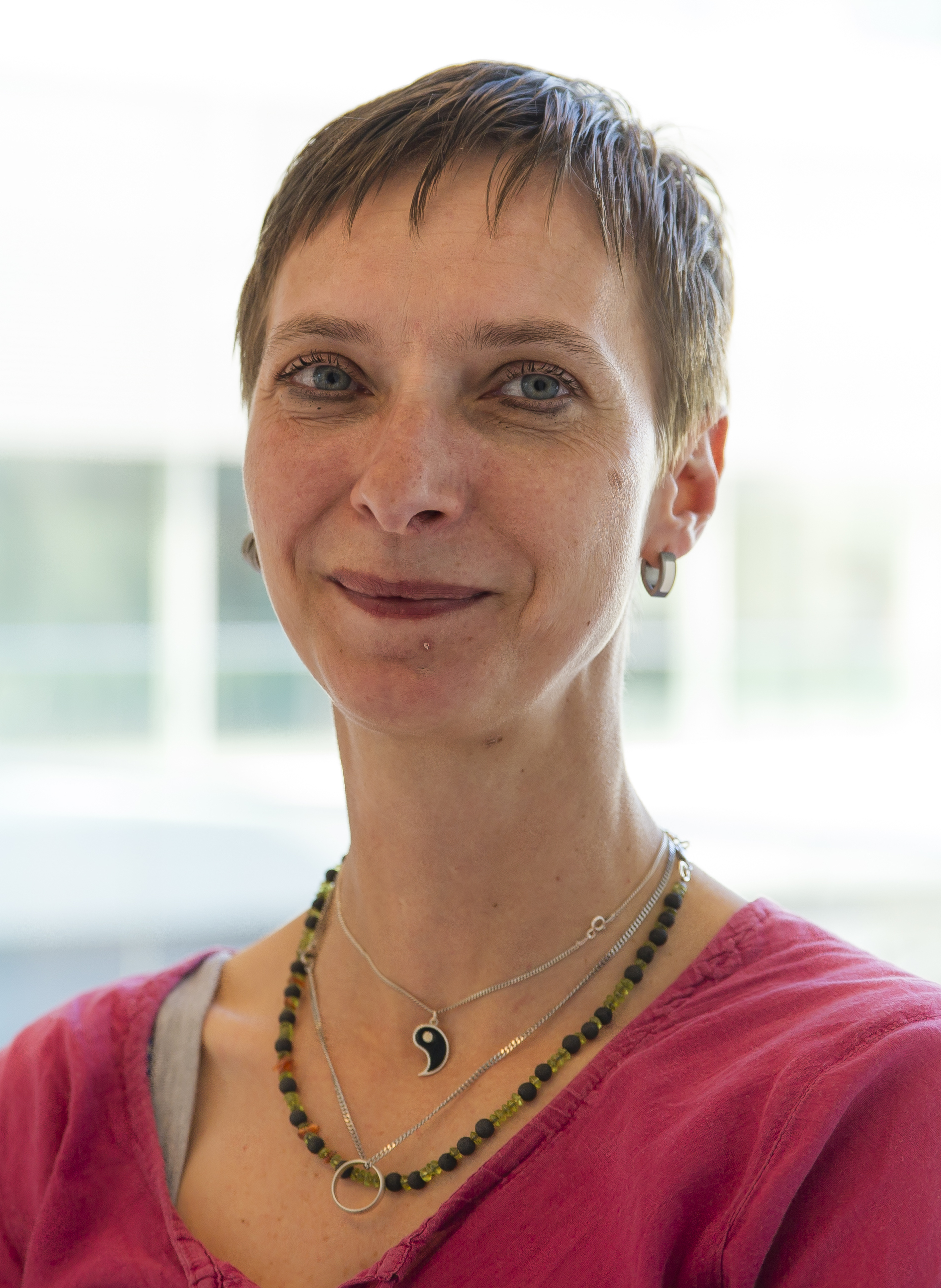
- Wawzyniak in 2014

Member of the Bundestag
- In office 27 September 2009 – 24 September 2017

Deputy Leader of The Left
- In office 24 May 2008 – 2 June 2012

Personal details
- Born: Halina Wawzyniak; 17 July 1973 (age 53) Königs Wusterhausen, East Germany
- Party: The Left (2007–present); PDS (1990–2007)
- Education: Free University of Berlin

Halina Wawzyniak (born 17 July 1973) is a German politician of The Left who served as a member of the Bundestag from 2009 to 2017. She was federal co-deputy leader of The Left from 2008 to 2012.

== Early life and education ==
Wawzyniak graduated from high school in 1992 and studied law at the Free University of Berlin. After the second state examination in 2002, she worked as an independent lawyer until 2005. From 2005 to 2009 she worked as a legal advisor for The Left's parliamentary group in the Bundestag.

== Political career ==
Wawzyniak joined the Party of Democratic Socialism in August 1990 at the age of 17. She co-founded the Young Comrades Working Group (AGJG), which was replaced in 1999 by Left Youth Solid.

In the late 1990s she became a member of the PDS party executive. In the 2001 Berlin state election, she ran as a direct candidate for the PDS in Kreuzberg, but was not elected. During the 2002 federal election, Wawzyniak was head of the PDS election campaign office in Berlin. In 2003, she was a member of the commission which drafted the PDS federal platform. In December 2005, Wawzyniak was elected deputy chair of the Berlin branch of the PDS.

Alongside others such as Bodo Ramelow and Dietmar Bartsch, Wawzyniak helped organise the merger of the PDS and WASG to create The Left party. Wawzyniak was particularly responsible for legal aspects of the merger. She was subsequently elected to the federal executive at the new party's first congress in 2007. In the same year, she became chair of the party association in Friedrichshain-Kreuzberg, which she remained until 2011. At the 2008 federal congress, she was elected one of The Left's deputy chairpersons.

In the 2009 federal election, Wawzyniak ran as a direct candidate in Berlin-Friedrichshain-Kreuzberg – Prenzlauer Berg East, challenging incumbent Green MdB Hans-Christian Ströbele. Wawzyniak placed second with 17.6% of votes, and was elected to the Bundestag via the state party list. She became spokeswoman for digital policy in the party's parliamentary group, as well as chair of the Internet and Digital Society Inquiry Commission, and deputy chair of the legal committee.

In the 2013 federal election, Wawzyniak was re-elected to the Bundestag, placing fifth on the party's state list. She subsequently served as one of seven parliamentary directors of The Left group. She did not run for re-election in the 2017 federal election.

Since 2018, she has been parliamentary group manager for The Left group in the Abgeordnetenhaus of Berlin.
