= Katrin Schmidberger =

German politician (born 1982)

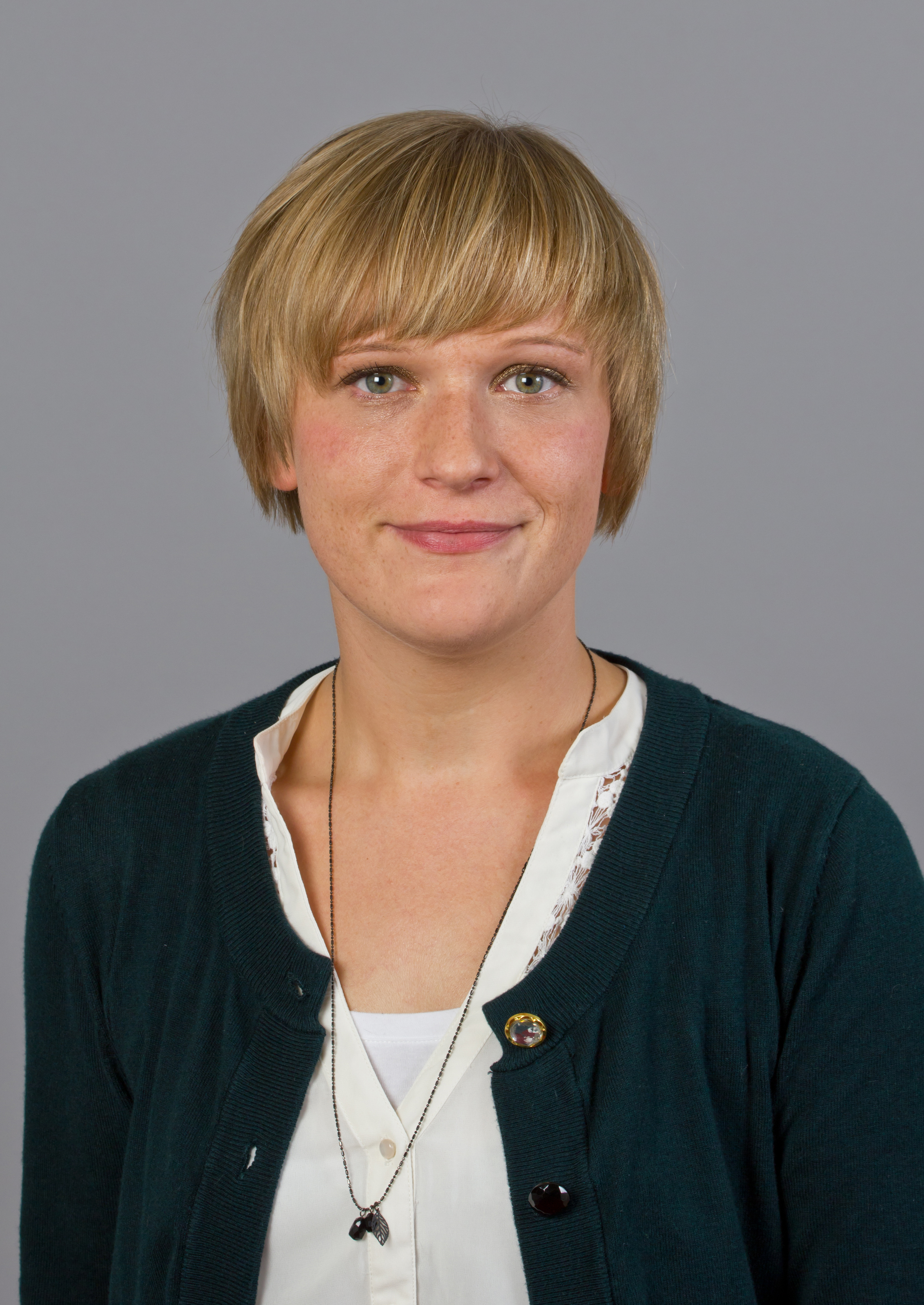
- Schmidberger in 2013

Member of the Abgeordnetenhaus of Berlin
- Incumbent
- Assumed office 27 October 2011

Personal details
- Born: Katrin Schmidberger; 3 August 1982 (age 44) Rosenheim, Bavaria, West Germany
- Party: Alliance 90/The Greens
- Education: Humboldt University of Berlin

Katrin Schmidberger (born 1982) is a German politician of Alliance 90/The Greens who has been serving as a member of the Abgeordnetenhaus of Berlin since 2011.

== Life and education ==
Schmidberger grew up in Neumarkt in der Oberpfalz in Bavaria, where she graduated from the Ostendorfer-Gymnasium in 2002. She has lived in Berlin since 2002, where she studied social sciences at the Humboldt University of Berlin. From 2003 to 2011, she worked on the staff of Hans-Christian Ströbele, a Green representative in the Bundestag. Schmidberger speaks German, English, French, and Latin.

== Politics ==
Schmidberger joined the Greens in 2000. She was spokesperson for the Bavarian branch of the Green Youth from 2000 to 2001 and political director for the federal Green Youth from 2002 to 2004. She also served as representative for the Green Youth on the council of attac. In 2006, she joined the executive committee of the Greens' Friedrichshain-Kreuzberg district branch, serving until 2011.

Schmidberger was elected to the Abgeordnetenhaus of Berlin in the 2011 Berlin state election on the Greens party list. She became Greens spokeswoman for rent, culture, and the social city, and joined the Committee for Urban Development and Housing and the Committee for Interior, Security and Order.

She was re-elected in the 2016 Berlin state election, winning the constituency of Friedrichshain-Kreuzberg 1 with 44.1% of votes, the second-strongest performance of any candidate statewide. Afterwards, she became spokeswoman for housing, rent, and tourism. Schmidberger was re-elected to the Abgeordnetenhaus again in 2021, retaining her constituency with 41.2% of votes. In the new parliament, she remained spokeswoman for housing and rent and also became spokeswoman for budget policy.

Schmidberger sits on the social affairs board of Arbeiterwohlfahrt Berlin, a member of the Rent and Alternative Housing Policy network, and a member of the New Property Policy roundtable.

She was the direct candidate in Berlin-Friedrichshain-Kreuzberg – Prenzlauer Berg East in the 2025 German federal election.

== Political positions ==
Schmidberger advocates for the preservation of affordable housing, the protection of tenants from displacement, and socially-oriented urban development. She opposes the use of housing as vacation rentals and calls for tighter restrictions on misuse of housing in Berlin. Schmidberger supports the preservation of social housing in Berlin and opposes the privatisation of public properties. For example, she opposed the Institute for Federal Real Estate's proposed sale of the Dragoner-Areal in Kreuzberg to a private investor. She supports the Berlin rent cap and the initiative to expropriate Deutsche Wohnen.
