= Groß-Gerau (electoral district) =

Federal electoral district of Germany

183 Groß-Gerau
- Electoral district for the Bundestag
- Groß-Gerau in 2025
- State: Hesse
- Population: 275,700 (2019)
- Electorate: 174,082 (2021)
- Major settlements: Rüsselsheim am Main; Mörfelden-Walldorf; Groß-Gerau
- Area: 453.0 km^{2}

Current electoral district
- Created: 1949
- Member: Vacant
- Elected: 2025

Groß-Gerau is an electoral constituency (German: Wahlkreis) represented in the Bundestag. It elects one member via first-past-the-post voting. Under the current constituency numbering system, it is designated as constituency 183. It is located in southern Hesse, comprising the Groß-Gerau district.

Groß-Gerau was created for the inaugural 1949 federal election. From 2021 to 2025, it was represented by Melanie Wegling of the Social Democratic Party (SPD).

== Geography ==
Groß-Gerau is located in southern Hesse. As of the 2021 federal election, it is coterminous with the Groß-Gerau district.

== History ==
Groß-Gerau was created in 1949. In the 1949 election, it was Hesse constituency 18 in the numbering system. From 1953 through 1976, it was number 143. From 1980 through 1998, it was number 141. In the 2002 and 2005 elections, it was number 185. In the 2009 through 2021 elections, it was number 184. From the 2025 election, it has been number 183.

Originally, the constituency comprised the districts of Groß-Gerau and Main-Taunus-Kreis. In the 1965 through 1972 elections, it comprised the Groß-Gerau district and the modern municipalities of Eppstein, Hofheim am Taunus, Hattersheim am Main, Kriftel, Flörsheim am Main, and Hochheim am Main from the Main-Taunus-Kreis district. In the 1976 through 1998 elections, it comprised the Groß-Gerau district and the municipalities of Hofheim am Taunus, Flörsheim am Main, and Hochheim am Main from the Main-Taunus-Kreis district. Since the 2002 election, it has been coterminous with the Groß-Gerau district.

Election	No.	Name	Borders
1949	18	Groß-Gerau	Groß-Gerau district; Main-Taunus-Kreis district
1953	143	Groß-Gerau	Groß-Gerau district; Main-Taunus-Kreis district
1957	143	Groß-Gerau	Groß-Gerau district; Main-Taunus-Kreis district
1961	143	Groß-Gerau	Groß-Gerau district; Main-Taunus-Kreis district
1965	143	Groß-Gerau	Groß-Gerau district; Main-Taunus-Kreis district (only Eppstein, Hofheim am Taunus, Hattersheim am Main, Kriftel, Flörsheim am Main, and Hochheim am Main municipalities)
1969	143	Groß-Gerau	Groß-Gerau district; Main-Taunus-Kreis district (only Eppstein, Hofheim am Taunus, Hattersheim am Main, Kriftel, Flörsheim am Main, and Hochheim am Main municipalities)
1972	143	Groß-Gerau	Groß-Gerau district; Main-Taunus-Kreis district (only Eppstein, Hofheim am Taunus, Hattersheim am Main, Kriftel, Flörsheim am Main, and Hochheim am Main municipalities)
1976	143	Groß-Gerau	Groß-Gerau district; Main-Taunus-Kreis district (only Hofheim am Taunus, Flörsheim am Main, and Hochheim am Main municipalities)
1980	141	Groß-Gerau	Groß-Gerau district; Main-Taunus-Kreis district (only Hofheim am Taunus, Flörsheim am Main, and Hochheim am Main municipalities)
1983	141	Groß-Gerau	Groß-Gerau district; Main-Taunus-Kreis district (only Hofheim am Taunus, Flörsheim am Main, and Hochheim am Main municipalities)
1987	141	Groß-Gerau	Groß-Gerau district; Main-Taunus-Kreis district (only Hofheim am Taunus, Flörsheim am Main, and Hochheim am Main municipalities)
1990	141	Groß-Gerau	Groß-Gerau district; Main-Taunus-Kreis district (only Hofheim am Taunus, Flörsheim am Main, and Hochheim am Main municipalities)
1994	141	Groß-Gerau	Groß-Gerau district; Main-Taunus-Kreis district (only Hofheim am Taunus, Flörsheim am Main, and Hochheim am Main municipalities)
1998	141	Groß-Gerau	Groß-Gerau district; Main-Taunus-Kreis district (only Hofheim am Taunus, Flörsheim am Main, and Hochheim am Main municipalities)
2002	185	Groß-Gerau	Groß-Gerau district
2005	185	Groß-Gerau	Groß-Gerau district
2009	184	Groß-Gerau	Groß-Gerau district
2013	184	Groß-Gerau	Groß-Gerau district
2017	184	Groß-Gerau	Groß-Gerau district
2021	184	Groß-Gerau	Groß-Gerau district
2025	183	Groß-Gerau	Groß-Gerau district

== Members ==
The constituency was first represented by Ludwig Bergsträsser of the Social Democratic Party (SPD) from 1949 to 1953. He was succeeded by fellow SPD member Hermann Schmitt-Vockenhausen, who served from 1953 to 1980, a total of seven consecutive terms. Norbert Wieczorek of the SPD then served a single term before Otto Zink of the Christian Democratic Union (CDU) won the constituency in 1983. Former member Wieczorek regained it for the SPD in 1990, but Heinz-Adolf Hörsken returned to the CDU in 1994. Wieczorek won a third non-consecutive term in 1998, and was succeeded by fellow SPD member Gerold Reichenbach in the 2002 election, who served two terms. Franz Josef Jung of the CDU won the constituency in 2009 and served until 2017. Stefan Sauer of the CDU was elected in 2017. Melanie Wegling regained it for the SPD in 2021.

Election	Member	Party	%
1949	Ludwig Bergsträsser	SPD	38.8
1953	Hermann Schmitt-Vockenhausen	SPD	38.8
1957	Hermann Schmitt-Vockenhausen	SPD	43.0
1961	Hermann Schmitt-Vockenhausen	SPD	47.6
1965	Hermann Schmitt-Vockenhausen	SPD	52.2
1969	Hermann Schmitt-Vockenhausen	SPD	53.4
1972	Hermann Schmitt-Vockenhausen	SPD	56.7
1976	Hermann Schmitt-Vockenhausen	SPD	51.2
1980	Norbert Wieczorek	SPD	50.6
1983	Otto Zink	CDU	46.0
1987	Otto Zink	CDU	43.7
1990	Norbert Wieczorek	SPD	41.8
1994	Heinz-Adolf Hörsken	CDU	42.7
1998	Norbert Wieczorek	SPD	48.3
2002	Gerold Reichenbach	SPD	50.2
2005	Gerold Reichenbach	SPD	47.1
2009	Franz Josef Jung	CDU	36.3
2013	Franz Josef Jung	CDU	42.2
2017	Stefan Sauer	CDU	35.1
2021	Melanie Wegling	SPD	33.5
2025	Vacant (Note: Marcus Kretschmann (CDU) won with 30.3% but seat remained vacant due to insufficient second votes cover.)		

== Election results ==
=== 2025 election ===
Federal election (2025): Groß-Gerau
Notes:	Blue background denotes the winner of the electorate vote. Pink background denotes a candidate elected from their party list. Yellow background denotes an electorate win by a list member, or other incumbent. A ✓ or ✗ denotes status of any incumbent, win or lose respectively.						
Party	Candidate	Votes	%	±%	Party votes	%	±%
CDU	Marcus Kretschmann	42,181	30.3	▲2.6	37,903	27.2	▲5.8
SPD	✗ Melanie Wegling	40,121	28.9	▼4.6	27,978	20.1	▼9.7
AfD	Ingeborg Horn-Posmyk	22,817	16.4	▲7.9	23,606	16.9	▲8.1
Greens	Isabel Köhler-Hande	11,195	8.1	▼3.6	15,832	11.4	▼3.5
Left	Jörg Cezanne	12,390	8.9	▲5.0	13,876	10.0	▲5.7
BSW					7,888	5.7	New
FDP	Stephen Dehler	4,667	3.4	▼5.1	6,266	4.5	▼7.3
Tierschutzpartei					1,940	1.4	▼0.3
FW	Rolf Leinz	3,442	2.5	▼0.2	1,816	1.3	▼0.6
Volt	Uwe Lautenschläger	1,896	1.4	New	1,073	0.8	▲0.4
PARTEI					816	0.6	▼0.5
BD					209	0.1	New
Humanists					142	0.1	0.0
MLPD	Anne Fröhlich	290	0.2	▲0.1	84	0.1	0.0
Informal votes		1,682			1,252		
Total valid votes		138,999			139,429		
Turnout		140,681	81.6	▲7.4			
CDU gain from SPD	Majority	2,060	1.4	N/A			

=== 2021 election ===
Federal election (2021): Groß-Gerau
Notes:	Blue background denotes the winner of the electorate vote. Pink background denotes a candidate elected from their party list. Yellow background denotes an electorate win by a list member, or other incumbent. A ✓ or ✗ denotes status of any incumbent, win or lose respectively.						
Party	Candidate	Votes	%	±%	Party votes	%	±%
SPD	Melanie Wegling	42,598	33.5	▲1.1	37,973	29.8	▲4.4
CDU	✗ Stefan Sauer	35,334	27.7	▼7.4	27,301	21.4	▼9.1
Greens	Lars Nitschke	14,890	11.7	▲4.9	18,928	14.8	▲4.8
AfD	Thorsten Blümlein	10,880	8.5	▼2.8	11,246	8.8	▼3.3
FDP	Stephan Dehler	10,726	8.4	▲2.8	14,999	11.8	▲2.1
Left	Jörg Cezanne	5,047	4.0	▼2.7	5,394	4.2	▼4.0
FW	Achim Weidner	3,470	2.7	▲0.8	2,478	1.9	▲0.9
Tierschutzpartei					2,163	1.7	▲0.6
Team Todenhöfer					1,998	1.6	
PARTEI	Daniel Weber	2,430	1.9		1,387	1.1	▲0.2
dieBasis	Thomas Unverzagt	1,834	1.4		1,462	1.1	
Pirates					545	0.4	▼0.3
Volt					469	0.4	
Gesundheitsforschung					214	0.2	
Humanists					175	0.1	
Bündnis C					157	0.1	
NPD					149	0.1	▼0.2
V-Partei3					141	0.1	▼0.1
ÖDP					137	0.1	0.0
DKP					92	0.1	0.0
MLPD	Johannes Rücker	127	0.1	▼0.1	81	0.1	0.0
Bündnis 21					56	0.0	
LKR					39	0.0	
Informal votes		1,925			1,677		
Total valid votes		127,336			127,584		
Turnout		129,261	74.3	▼2.0			
SPD gain from CDU	Majority	7,264	5.8				

=== 2017 election ===
Federal election (2017): Groß-Gerau
Notes:	Blue background denotes the winner of the electorate vote. Pink background denotes a candidate elected from their party list. Yellow background denotes an electorate win by a list member, or other incumbent. A ✓ or ✗ denotes status of any incumbent, win or lose respectively.						
Party	Candidate	Votes	%	±%	Party votes	%	±%
CDU	Stefan Sauer	45,963	35.1	▼7.1	39,950	30.5	▼6.2
SPD	Jan Deboy	42,342	32.4	▼5.7	33,318	25.4	▼5.1
AfD	Thorsten Blümlein	14,805	11.3		15,943	12.2	▲6.5
Greens	Nina Eisenhardt	8,877	6.8	▼0.9	11,862	9.0	▼1.6
Left	Jörg Cezanne	8,729	6.7	▲0.5	10,755	8.2	▲2.0
FDP	Stephan Dehler	7,358	5.6	▲3.6	12,645	9.6	▲5.0
Tierschutzpartei					1,463	1.1	
FW	Jens Hassen	2,507	1.9		1,387	1.1	▲0.2
PARTEI					1,192	0.9	▲0.4
Pirates					962	0.7	▼1.7
NPD					403	0.3	▼0.8
DM					386	0.3	
BGE					244	0.2	
V-Partei³					222	0.2	
ÖDP					201	0.2	
MLPD	Matthias Rücker	276	0.2		124	0.1	0.0
DKP					81	0.1	
BüSo					42	0.0	0.0
Informal votes		2,461			2,138		
Total valid votes		130,857			131,180		
Turnout		133,318	76.3	▲3.1			
CDU hold	Majority	3,621	2.7	▼1.4			

=== 2013 election ===
Federal election (2013): Groß-Gerau
Notes:	Blue background denotes the winner of the electorate vote. Pink background denotes a candidate elected from their party list. Yellow background denotes an electorate win by a list member, or other incumbent. A ✓ or ✗ denotes status of any incumbent, win or lose respectively.						
Party	Candidate	Votes	%	±%	Party votes	%	±%
CDU	✓ Franz Josef Jung	52,087	42.2	▲5.9	45,389	36.7	▲6.8
SPD	Gerold Reichenbach	46,942	38.1	▲2.1	37,781	30.5	▲2.6
Greens	Benjamin Weiß	9,502	7.7	▼1.9	13,129	10.6	▼1.9
Left	Jochen Nagel	7,645	6.2	▼1.4	7,693	6.2	▼2.6
AfD					6,939	5.6	
Pirates	Christian Hufgard	4,639	3.8		2,989	2.4	▲0.2
FDP	Marcella Giovanna Matthes	2,489	2.0	▼6.1	5,762	4.7	▼10.2
NPD					1,430	1.2	▼0.2
FW					1,036	0.8	
PARTEI					643	0.5	
REP					509	0.4	▼0.5
PRO					200	0.2	
MLPD					76	0.1	0.0
SGP					61	0.0	
BüSo					52	0.0	▼0.1
Informal votes		4,079			3,694		
Total valid votes		123,304			123,689		
Turnout		127,383	73.2	▼1.2			
CDU hold	Majority	5,145	4.1	▲3.8			

=== 2009 election ===
Federal election (2009): Groß-Gerau
Notes:	Blue background denotes the winner of the electorate vote. Pink background denotes a candidate elected from their party list. Yellow background denotes an electorate win by a list member, or other incumbent. A ✓ or ✗ denotes status of any incumbent, win or lose respectively.						
Party	Candidate	Votes	%	±%	Party votes	%	±%
CDU	Franz Josef Jung	45,410	36.3	▼0.1	37,526	29.9	▼1.2
SPD	✗ Gerold Reichenbach	44,973	36.0	▼11.1	35,058	28.0	▼11.3
Greens	Andrea Graf	12,072	9.7	▲3.5	15,677	12.5	▲1.8
FDP	Andreas Bummel	10,177	8.1	▲4.4	18,630	14.9	▲4.2
Left	Norman Kalteyer	9,449	7.6	▲3.2	11,103	8.9	▲3.7
Pirates					2,772	2.2	
NPD	Andreas Jahn	2,457	2.0	▲0.1	1,680	1.3	0.0
Tierschutzpartei					1,463	1.2	▲0.3
REP					1,098	0.9	▼0.2
Independent	Pasquale Aita	482	0.4				
BüSo					178	0.1	▲0.1
DVU					109	0.1	
MLPD					60	0.0	0.0
Informal votes		3,099			2,765		
Total valid votes		125,020			125,354		
Turnout		128,119	74.4	▼5.6			
CDU gain from SPD	Majority	437	0.3				

=== 2005 election ===
Federal election (2005):Groß-Gerau
Notes:	Blue background denotes the winner of the electorate vote. Pink background denotes a candidate elected from their party list. Yellow background denotes an electorate win by a list member, or other incumbent. A ✓ or ✗ denotes status of any incumbent, win or lose respectively.						
Party	Candidate	Votes	%	±%	Party votes	%	±%
SPD	✓ Gerold Reichenbach	62,419	47.1	▼3.1	52,132	39.2	▼4.4
CDU	Gerald Weiß	48,321	36.4	▲1.3	40,054	30.2	▼2.1
Greens	Margareta Wolf	8,100	6.1	▼1.4	14,261	10.7	▼0.7
Left	Gerhard Schulmeyer	5,736	4.3	▲2.5	6,824	5.1	▲3.7
FDP	Andreas Bummel	4,957	3.7	▼1.6	14,182	10.7	▲2.9
NPD	Erwin Bender	2,475	1.9		1,760	1.3	▲1.0
REP					1,440	1.1	▼0.3
Tierschutzpartei					1,155	0.9	▲0.2
GRAUEN					650	0.5	▲0.3
PBC	Norbert Lohneis	588	0.4				
SGP					171	0.1	
BüSo					109	0.1	0.0
MLPD					91	0.1	
Informal votes		3,240			3,007		
Total valid votes		132,596			132,829		
Turnout		135,836	80.0	▼1.0			
SPD hold	Majority	14,098	10.7				
