= Franz Josef Jung =

German politician (born 1949)

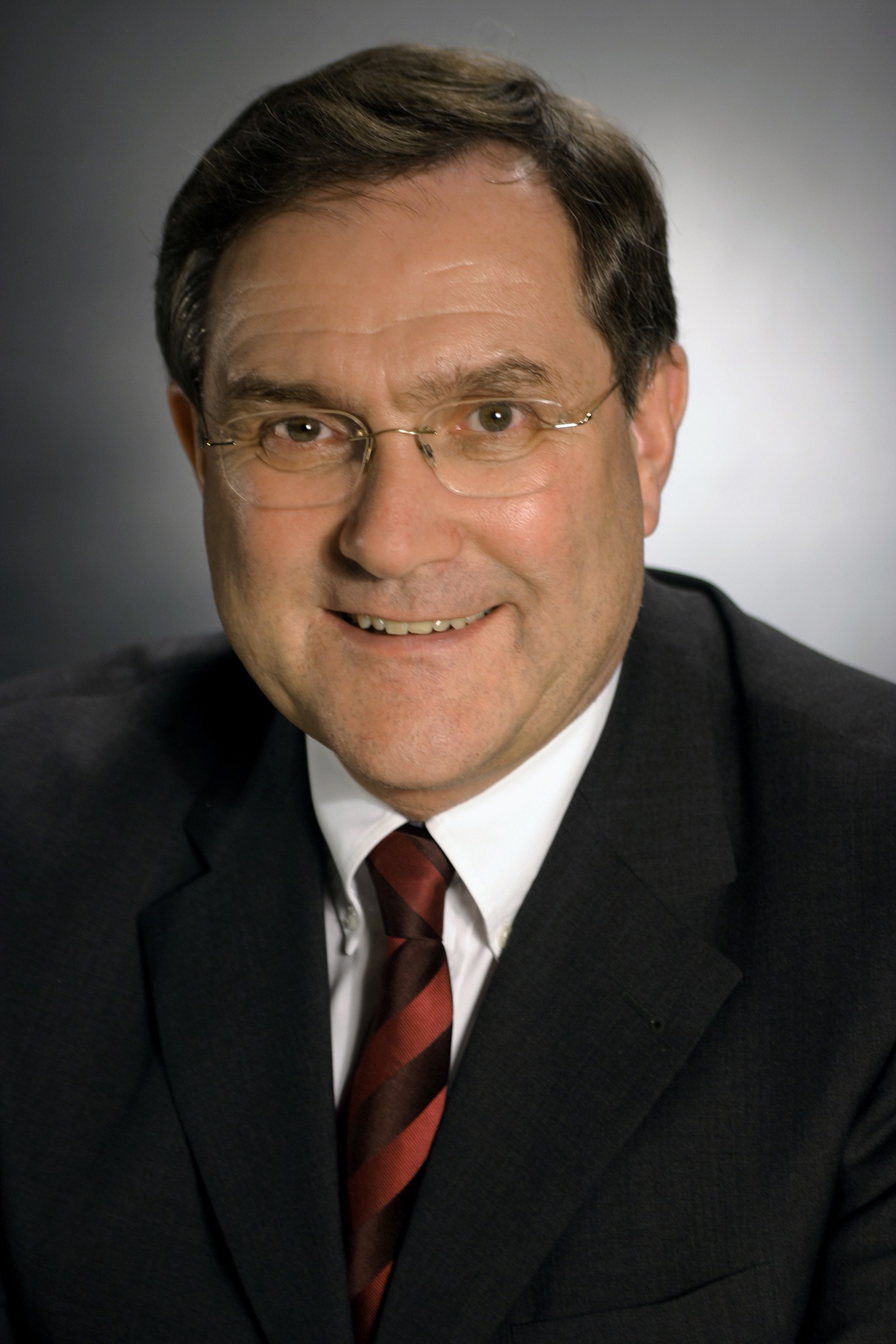
- Jung in 2010

Minister of Labour and Social Affairs
- In office 28 October 2009 – 27 November 2009
- Chancellor: Angela Merkel
- Preceded by: Olaf Scholz
- Succeeded by: Ursula von der Leyen

Minister of Defence
- In office 22 November 2005 – 27 October 2009
- Chancellor: Angela Merkel
- Preceded by: Peter Struck
- Succeeded by: Karl-Theodor zu Guttenberg

Member of the Bundestag; from Hesse
- In office 18 October 2005 – 24 October 2017
- Preceded by: Multi-member district
- Succeeded by: Stefan Sauer
- Constituency: State list (2005–2009); Groß-Gerau (2009–2017)
Hesse state offices
Minister for Federal and European Affairs of Hesse
In office 7 April 1999 – 7 September 2000
Minister-President	Roland Koch
Preceded by	Rupert von Plottnitz
Succeeded by	Jochen Riebel
Member of the Landtag of Hesse; for Rheingau-Taunus I
In office 25 September 1983 – 21 November 2005
Preceded by	Constituency established
Succeeded by	Petra Müller-Klepper

Personal details
- Born: Franz Josef Friedrich Jung; 5 March 1949 (age 77) Erbach, Germany
- Party: Christian Democratic Union
- Children: 3
- Education: University of Mainz
- Profession: Lawyer
- Website: franz-josef-jung.de

Franz Josef Jung (born 5 March 1949) is a German politician of the Christian Democratic Union (CDU). He became Federal Minister of Defence in the Grand coalition cabinet of Angela Merkel on 22 November 2005. In October 2009 he became Minister of Labour and Social Affairs but resigned a month later.

== Life and work ==
After his military service, Jung studied law at the University of Mainz and is a lawyer and civil law notary. In 1978 Jung successfully completed his doctoral studies at the University of Mainz and was hence awarded the title Dr. jur. (i.e. PhD in law).

In his political career, he held various party functions in Hesse (currently as vice chairman of the CDU there) and also served as a state minister. As Minister-President Roland Koch's chief of staff in the Hesse chancellery, Jung resigned amid the CDU donations scandal in 2000.

Even before entering the Bundestag, Jung was a CDU delegate to the Federal Convention for the purpose of electing the President of Germany in 1989, 1994, 1999 and 2004.

=== Federal Minister of Defence (2005–2009) ===
Following the 2005 federal elections, Jung became a member of the German Bundestag and joined the first cabinet of Chancellor Angela Merkel.

Between December 2005 and March 2009, Jung visited the German military bases in Kunduz, Mazar-i-Sharif and Faizabad three times. During a later trip to Northern Afghanistan in early April 2009, he joined German Chancellor Angela Merkel in visiting reconstruction efforts in Mazar-i-Sharif.

In September 2007, Jung sparked a debate by his controversial assertion to shoot down jetliners in the case of a terrorist attack on Germany.

Several politicians of the opposition parties as well as politicians from the SPD, especially Reinhard Bütikofer and Kurt Beck, described his move as "unconstitutional" and called for his resignation.

In June 2007, Jung launched the F125 for $3 billion to the ARGE F125 consortium (ThyssenKrupp Marine Systems and Friedrich Lurssen Werft and Blohm + Voss) for 4 Frigates "without MK-41 missile launcher" (as for example has the previous F124 Sachsen class, able to pack enough missiles).

In early 2008, Jung rejected a sharply worded letter from his United States counterpart, Robert Gates, asking that Germany send soldiers and helicopters to southern Afghanistan, where the heaviest fighting was taking place at the time. Instead, Jung announced that Germany would deploy a rapid reaction force in northern Afghanistan to replace Norwegian troops.

=== Federal Minister of Labour and Social Affairs (2009) ===
On 27 November 2009, Jung tendered his resignation as Minister of Labour and Social Affairs because of the Kunduz airstrike in Afghanistan of 4 September 2009. The airstrike was against two fuel tankers that had been hijacked by the Taliban, but also resulted in the deaths of dozens of civilians. Jung's resignation was over allegations that, whilst he was Defence Minister, he intentionally downplayed the possibility that civilians had been killed in the airstrike. A video taken by the American F-15 fighter bomber involved in the airstrike was leaked to the newspaper Bild and is said to have clearly depicted civilians in the target area. However, it is not clear whether Jung knew about the video when he had denied that civilians were killed. Karl-Theodor zu Guttenberg succeeded Jung as minister of defence and Ursula von der Leyen replaced him in the post he was holding at the time of his resignation as federal minister of labour.

Jung's resignation came a day after the resignation of Wolfgang Schneiderhan, the Chief of Staff of the Bundeswehr, and Peter Wichert, a senior Defence Ministry official. Their resignations were described as Germany's "biggest military shake-up in more than two decades" and have been claimed as proof that the defence ministry actively suppressed information about the incident.

=== Member of the Bundestag (2009–2017) ===
From 2009 until 2013, Jung was a member of the parliamentary body in charge of selecting the judges of the Highest Courts of Justice, namely the Federal Court of Justice (BGH), the Federal Administrative Court (BVerwG), the Federal Fiscal Court (BFH), the Federal Labour Court (BAG), and the Federal Social Court (BSG).

After the 2013 elections, Jung was appointed deputy chairperson of the CDU/CSU parliamentary group in charge of food, agriculture and consumer protection. Following the death of Andreas Schockenhoff, he took on the foreign policy portfolio in early 2015.

In July 2016, Jung announced that he would not stand in the 2017 federal elections and resign from active politics by the end of the parliamentary term. In March 2017, it was announced that Jung is to join the supervisory board of defence and automotive engineering group Rheinmetall.

== Other activities ==
- Eintracht Frankfurt, Member of the Advisory Board
- Society to Promote the Geisenheim Grape Breeding Institute, President
- Federal Association for Soldiers’ Welfare (BAS), Chairman (since 2015)
- Petersburger Dialog, Member of the Board (since 2015)
- Rheingau Musik Festival, Member of the Board of Trustees (since 1989)
- ZDF, Member of the Television Board (since 1999)
- Hessian State Wineries Eberbach Monastery, Ex-officio Member of the supervisory board (2002–2005)

== Political positions ==
Ahead of the Christian Democrats’ leadership election in 2018, Jung publicly endorsed Friedrich Merz to succeed Angela Merkel as the party's chair.

== Recognition ==
- 2017 – Alfred Dregger Medal

== Personal life ==
Jung is a Roman Catholic. He is married with three children and lives in Erbach, Rheingau.

Political offices
Preceded by Norbert Schüren, Rupert von Plottnitz	Hessian Minister for Federal and European Affairs; 1999–2000	Succeeded by Jochen Riebel
Preceded by Peter Struck	German Minister of Defence; 2005–2009	Succeeded by Karl-Theodor zu Guttenberg
Preceded by Olaf Scholz	German Minister of Labour and Social Affairs; 2009	Succeeded by Ursula von der Leyen
