= Berlin-Friedrichshain-Kreuzberg – Prenzlauer Berg East =

Electoral constituency represented in the Bundestag

82 Berlin-Friedrichshain-Kreuzberg – Prenzlauer Berg East
- Electoral district for the Bundestag
- Berlin-Friedrichshain-Kreuzberg – Prenzlauer Berg East in 2025
- State: Berlin
- Population: 354,000 (2019)
- Electorate: 220,014 (2021)
- Area: 26.9 km^{2}

Current electoral district
- Created: 2002
- Party: The Left
- Member: Pascal Meiser
- Elected: 2025

Berlin-Friedrichshain-Kreuzberg – Prenzlauer Berg East (German: Bundestagswahlkreis Berlin-Friedrichshain-Kreuzberg – Prenzlauer Berg Ost) is an electoral constituency (German: Wahlkreis) represented in the Bundestag. It elects one member via first-past-the-post voting. Under the current constituency numbering system, it is designated as constituency 82. It is located in central Berlin, comprising the Friedrichshain-Kreuzberg borough and part of the adjoining borough Pankow.

Berlin-Friedrichshain-Kreuzberg – Prenzlauer Berg East was created for the 2002 federal election. Since 2025, it has been represented by Pascal Meiser of The Left.

== Geography ==
Berlin-Friedrichshain-Kreuzberg – Prenzlauer Berg East is located in central Berlin. As of the 2021 federal election, it comprises the Friedrichshain-Kreuzberg borough as well as the area of Pankow borough's Prenzlauer Berg east of Prenzlauer Allee. It is the smallest federal constituency in Germany by area.

== History ==
Berlin-Friedrichshain-Kreuzberg – Prenzlauer Berg East was created in 2002. Each section of the constituency had been an eponymous part of one of the three previous constituencies of Berlin Kreuzberg - Schöneberg, Berlin Friedrichshain - Lichtenberg and Berlin Mitte - Prenzlauer Berg. In the 2002 through 2009 elections, it was constituency 84 in the numbering system. In the 2013 through 2021 elections, it was number 83. From the 2025 election, it has been number 82. Its borders have not changed since its creation.

== Members ==
Until 2021, the constituency had the unique distinction of being the only federal constituency ever held by the Alliance 90/The Greens. It was first represented by Hans-Christian Ströbele, who was elected in 2002. He was re-elected in the 2005, 2009, and 2013 elections. Upon his retirement in the 2017 election, he was succeeded by Canan Bayram, who narrowly retained the constituency for the Greens. She was re-elected in 2021 with a greatly increased margin. In 2025, Pascal Meiser of The Left won the seat, taking it from the Greens for the first time.

Election	Member	Party	%
2002	Hans-Christian Ströbele	GRÜNE	31.6
2005	Hans-Christian Ströbele	GRÜNE	43.3
2009	Hans-Christian Ströbele	GRÜNE	46.7
2013	Hans-Christian Ströbele	GRÜNE	39.9
2017	Canan Bayram	GRÜNE	26.3
2021	Canan Bayram	GRÜNE	37.9
2025	Pascal Meiser	LINKE	34.7

== Election results ==
=== 2025 election ===
Federal election (2025): Berlin-Friedrichshain-Kreuzberg – Prenzlauer Berg East
Notes:	Blue background denotes the winner of the electorate vote. Pink background denotes a candidate elected from their party list. Yellow background denotes an electorate win by a list member, or other incumbent. A ✓ or ✗ denotes status of any incumbent, win or lose respectively.						
Party	Candidate	Votes	%	±%	Party votes	%	±%
Left	Pascal Meiser	62,049	34.7	▲16.6	57,057	31.7	▲13.1
Greens	Katrin Schmidberger	54,771	30.6	▼7.2	46,620	25.9	▼10.9
SPD	Carmen Sinnokrot	23,519	13.1	▼3.2	24,138	13.4	▼4.2
CDU	Kevin Kratzsch	17,940	10.0	▲1.5	16,722	9.3	▲1.3
AfD	Sibylle Schmidt	13,854	7.7	▲3.1	12,985	7.2	▲2.3
BSW					10,643	5.9	New
FDP	Sven Hoffmeister	4,277	2.4	▼2.1	5,010	2.8	▼2.4
Volt					2,055	1.1	▲0.3
Tierschutzpartei					1,771	1.0	▼0.9
PARTEI					1,489	0.8	▼1.6
Independent	Frigga Wendt	1,000	0.6	New			
Independent	Dorit Heider	713	0.4	New			
MERA25					390	0.2	New
Team Todenhöfer					324	0.2	▼1.0
FW					286	0.2	▼0.3
BD	Laura Scheer	934	0.5	New	245	0.1	New
PdF					241	0.1	New
MLPD					98	0.1	0.0
BüSo					33	0.0	0.0
SGP					26	0.0	0.0
Informal votes		1,812			735		
Total valid votes		179,057			180,134		
Turnout		180,869	82.7	▲13.6			
Left gain from Greens	Majority	7,278	4.1				

=== 2021 election ===
Federal election (2021): Berlin-Friedrichshain-Kreuzberg – Prenzlauer Berg East
Notes:	Blue background denotes the winner of the electorate vote. Pink background denotes a candidate elected from their party list. Yellow background denotes an electorate win by a list member, or other incumbent. A ✓ or ✗ denotes status of any incumbent, win or lose respectively.						
Party	Candidate	Votes	%	±%	Party votes	%	±%
Greens	✓ Canan Bayram	64,542	37.9	▲11.6	62,710	36.7	▲16.3
Left	Pascal Meiser	30,113	17.7	▼7.2	30,881	18.1	▼10.4
SPD	Cansel Kiziltepe	29,619	17.4	▲0.4	32,745	19.2	▲3.2
CDU	Kevin Kratzsch	13,030	7.7	▼4.6	11,910	7.0	▼6.9
FDP	Ann Cathrin Riedel	9,203	5.4	▲2.3	10,819	6.3	▲0.4
PARTEI	Martin Sonneborn	8,854	5.2	▼2.0	3,787	2.2	▼1.3
AfD	Sibylle Schmidt	6,598	3.9	▼2.3	6,988	4.1	▼2.2
Tierschutzpartei	Marie Motzkus	3,128	1.8		2,874	1.7	▲0.5
dieBasis	Carola Muysers	2,387	1.4				
Team Todenhöfer					2,119	1.2	
Volt					1,430	0.8	
Die Grauen					896	0.5	▲0.2
FW					866	0.5	▲0.3
Pirates	Franz Schmitt	915	0.5		708	0.4	▼0.3
Humanists	Stephan Heym	480	0.3		350	0.2	
du.	Nicole Drakos	392	0.2	▼0.2	380	0.2	0.0
Gesundheitsforschung					272	0.2	0.0
DKP					270	0.2	0.0
ÖDP	Hagen Albers	269	0.2		224	0.1	0.0
Independent	Oliver Snelinski	256	0.1				
B*	Zarah-Louise Roth	222	0.1	▼0.3			
Independent	FriGGa Wendt	184	0.1				
V-Partei3					153	0.1	▼0.1
MLPD	Chaker Anis Araki	175	0.1	▼0.1	77	0.0	▼0.1
NPD					61	0.0	
BüSo					46	0.0	0.0
LKR					41	0.0	
SGP					34	0.0	0.0
Informal votes		2,102			1,828		
Total valid votes		170,367			170,641		
Turnout		172,469	78.4	▲0.8			
Greens hold	Majority	34,429	20.2	▲18.8			

=== 2017 election ===
Federal election (2017): Berlin-Friedrichshain-Kreuzberg – Prenzlauer Berg East
Notes:	Blue background denotes the winner of the electorate vote. Pink background denotes a candidate elected from their party list. Yellow background denotes an electorate win by a list member, or other incumbent. A ✓ or ✗ denotes status of any incumbent, win or lose respectively.						
Party	Candidate	Votes	%	±%	Party votes	%	±%
Greens	Canan Bayram	45,055	26.3	▼13.6	35,077	20.4	▼0.3
Left	Pascal Meiser	42,600	24.9	▲7.7	49,016	28.5	▲3.4
SPD	Cansel Kiziltepe	29,028	16.9	▼1.0	27,391	15.9	▼8.1
CDU	Timur Husein	20,955	12.2	▼1.5	23,887	13.9	▼1.5
PARTEI	Serdar Somuncu	12,345	7.2	▲5.6	6,042	3.5	▲1.6
AfD	Sibylle Schmidt	10,558	6.2	▲4.2	10,863	6.3	▲3.5
FDP	Athanasia Rousiamani-Goldthau	5,263	3.1	▲2.1	10,147	5.9	▲3.7
Tierschutzpartei					2,119	1.2	
Independent	Frigga Wendt	1,298	0.8				
DiB					1,282	0.7	
Pirates					1,270	0.7	▼5.1
BGE					1,046	0.6	
Die Grauen					474	0.3	
du.	Frithjof Zerger	772	0.5		456	0.3	
Independent	Sebastian Blume	688	0.4				
B*	Fares Al-Hassan	672	0.4	0.0	304	0.2	
FW	Jan Zeiseweis	627	0.4	▲0.1	323	0.2	▼0.1
Independent	Thomas Hasel	443	0.3				
Independent	Markus Beckmann	391	0.2				
DM					334	0.2	
Menschliche Welt					324	0.2	
V-Partei³					323	0.2	
Gesundheitsforschung					304	0.2	
ÖDP					281	0.2	▼0.1
DKP					217	0.1	
MLPD	Klaus Freudigmann	305	0.2		174	0.1	0.0
Independent	Gregor Felde-Bajerowitz	168	0.1				
Independent	Christian Pape	148	0.1				
BüSo					53	0.0	0.0
SGP					37	0.0	▼0.1
Independent	Otto Ritter	33	0.0				
Informal votes		1,940			1,545		
Total valid votes		171,349			171,744		
Turnout		173,289	77.6	▲3.3			
Greens hold	Majority	2,455	1.4	▼20.5			

=== 2013 election ===
Federal election (2013): Berlin-Friedrichshain-Kreuzberg – Prenzlauer Berg East
Notes:	Blue background denotes the winner of the electorate vote. Pink background denotes a candidate elected from their party list. Yellow background denotes an electorate win by a list member, or other incumbent. A ✓ or ✗ denotes status of any incumbent, win or lose respectively.						
Party	Candidate	Votes	%	±%	Party votes	%	±%
Greens	✓ Hans-Christian Ströbele	66,056	39.9	▼6.8	34,420	20.8	▼6.6
SPD	Cansel Kiziltepe	29,799	18.0	▲1.3	39,784	24.0	▲3.8
Left	Halina Wawzyniak	28,441	17.2	▼0.4	41,639	25.1	▲0.1
CDU	Götz Müller	22,723	13.7	▲2.1	25,474	15.4	▲3.5
Pirates	Sebastian von Hoff	6,317	3.8		9,612	5.8	▼0.2
AfD	Andreas Dahl	3,325	2.0		4,623	2.8	
PARTEI	Helena Barbas	2,666	1.6		3,142	1.9	
FDP	Helmut Metzner	1,647	1.0	▼3.1	3,579	2.2	▼4.0
NPD	Sebastian Schmidtke	1,291	0.8	▼0.4	1,140	0.7	▼0.2
Independent	Di Leo	674	0.4				
B*		624	0.4				
BIG		602	0.4		594	0.4	
FW		515	0.3		477	0.3	
Independent	Beckmann	486	0.3				
DIE VIOLETTEN		457	0.3				
ÖDP					426	0.3	▲0.1
PRO					252	0.2	
MLPD					209	0.1	0.0
PSG					126	0.1	0.0
REP					107	0.1	▼0.1
BüSo		108	0.1		86	0.1	▼0.1
Informal votes		2,317			2,358		
Total valid votes		165,731			165,690		
Turnout		168,048	74.3	▲2.0			
Greens hold	Majority	36,257	21.9	▼7.2			

=== 2009 election ===
Federal election (2009): Berlin-Friedrichshain-Kreuzberg – Prenzlauer Berg East
Notes:	Blue background denotes the winner of the electorate vote. Pink background denotes a candidate elected from their party list. Yellow background denotes an electorate win by a list member, or other incumbent. A ✓ or ✗ denotes status of any incumbent, win or lose respectively.						
Party	Candidate	Votes	%	±%	Party votes	%	±%
Greens	✓ Hans-Christian Ströbele	73,897	46.7	▲3.4	43,347	27.4	▲5.5
Left	Halina Wawzyniak	27,796	17.6	▼0.5	39,641	25.0	▲4.2
SPD	Björn Böhning	26,415	16.7	▼4.1	32,015	20.2	▼17.1
CDU	Vera Lengsfeld	18,394	11.6	▲0.3	18,788	11.9	▲0.8
Pirates					9,473	6.0	
FDP	Markus Löning	6,425	4.1	▲1.4	9,693	6.1	▲1.6
Tierschutzpartei					1,793	1.1	
NPD	Christian Steup	1,791	1.1	▼0.4	1,436	0.9	▼0.3
Independent	Thomas Feldhaus	1,555	1.0				
Independent	Hauke Stiewe	918	0.6				
DIE VIOLETTEN					757	0.5	
DKP	Rolf Meier	649	0.4		354	0.2	
ÖDP					306	0.2	
REP					284	0.2	▼0.1
Independent	Ralph Otto Naumann	232	0.1				
Independent	Georg Nägle	217	0.1				
PSG					171	0.1	0.0
BüSo					166	0.1	0.0
MLPD					130	0.1	0.0
DVU					118	0.1	
Informal votes		2,572			2,419		
Total valid votes		158,289			158,442		
Turnout		160,861	72.2	▼4.3			
Greens hold	Majority	46,101	29.1	▲6.5			

=== 2005 election ===
Federal election (2005): Berlin-Friedrichshain-Kreuzberg – Prenzlauer Berg East
Notes:	Blue background denotes the winner of the electorate vote. Pink background denotes a candidate elected from their party list. Yellow background denotes an electorate win by a list member, or other incumbent. A ✓ or ✗ denotes status of any incumbent, win or lose respectively.						
Party	Candidate	Votes	%	±%	Party votes	%	±%
Greens	✓ Hans-Christian Ströbele	69,988	43.3	▲11.7	35,410	21.8	▼1.3
SPD	Ahmet İyidirli	33,562	20.7	▼8.4	60,421	37.3	▼1.9
Left	Cornelia Reinauer	29,145	18.0	▼3.4	33,711	20.8	▲3.6
CDU	Kurt Wansner	18,300	11.3	▼1.7	17,899	11.0	▼1.8
FDP	Christopher Paun	4,328	2.7	▼0.4	7,402	4.6	▲0.8
NPD		2,466	1.5		1,923	1.2	▲0.7
GRAUEN					1,788	1.1	▲0.4
Independent		1,356	0.8				
PARTEI		1,363	0.8		1,160	0.7	
Feminist					683	0.4	0.0
APPD		699	0.4		864	0.5	
REP					415	0.3	▼0.2
BüSo		329	0.2		170	0.1	0.0
Humanist		268	0.2				
MLPD					170	0.1	
SGP					146	0.1	
Informal votes		3,034			2,676		
Total valid votes		161,804			162,162		
Turnout		164,838	76.6	▲1.1			
Greens hold	Majority	36,426	22.6	▲20.1			

=== 2002 election ===
Federal election (2002): Berlin-Friedrichshain-Kreuzberg – Prenzlauer Berg East
Notes:	Blue background denotes the winner of the electorate vote. Pink background denotes a candidate elected from their party list. Yellow background denotes an electorate win by a list member, or other incumbent. A ✓ or ✗ denotes status of any incumbent, win or lose respectively.						
Party	Candidate	Votes	%	±%	Party votes	%	±%
Greens	Hans-Christian Ströbele	49,204	31.6		36,073	23.1	
SPD	Andreas Matthae	45,400	29.1		61,160	39.2	
PDS	Bärbel Grygier	33,324	21.4		26,828	17.2	
CDU	Kurt Wansner	20,321	13.0		20,047	12.8	
FDP	Martina Schaefer	4,738	3.0		5,894	3.8	
Schill					1,851	1.2	
GRAUEN		1,951	1.3		1,106	0.7	
REP					827	0.5	
NPD					726	0.5	
Feminist					642	0.4	
Independent		607	0.4				
DKP		322	0.2				
KPD					245	0.2	
ÖDP					227	0.1	
PBC					160	0.1	
Humanist					139	0.1	
BüSo					105	0.1	
Informal votes		2,582			2,419		
Total valid votes		155,867			156,030		
Turnout		158,449	75.5				
Greens win new seat	Majority	3,804	2.5				
