= Ludwig Bergsträsser =

German politician (1883–1960)

Member of the Bundestag; for Groß-Gerau
- In office 7 September 1949 – 6 October 1953
- Preceded by: Constituency established
- Succeeded by: Hermann Schmitt-Vockenhausen

Member of the Landtag of Hesse
- In office 15 July 1946 – 19 October 1949
- Preceded by: Multi-member district
- Succeeded by: Jean Christoph Harth
- Constituency: State list (1946); Wahlkreis I (1946–1949)

Member of the Reichstag; for Potsdam I
- In office 27 May 1924 – 13 June 1928

Personal details
- Born: 23 February 1883 Altkirch, Alsace-Lorraine, Germany
- Died: 23 March 1960 (aged 77) Darmstadt, West Germany
- Party: Social Democratic (after 1930)
- Other political affiliations: DDP (1919–1930)
- Spouse: Martha Unger (m. 1910; died 1957)
- Children: 4
- Education: Heidelberg University; LMU Munich; Leipzig University; University of Paris

Ludwig Bergsträsser (23 February 1883 – 23 March 1960) was a German politician, representative of the Social Democratic Party.

After the founding of Greater Hesse by Proclamation No. 2 of the American military government on 19 September 1945, Bergsträsser's term as head of government ended on 12 October 1945. He was succeeded by Karl Geiler as Prime Minister of Greater Hesse on 14 October 1945. The previous “German Government” in Darmstadt was renamed “Regional President of Hesse” on 4 November 1945, and finally “Regional President of Darmstadt” on 21 January 1946. The People's State of Hesse and its areas on the right bank of the Rhine were thus merged into the new state as the administrative district of Darmstadt . Bergsträsser remained district president until 1948.

== See also ==
- List of Social Democratic Party of Germany politicians
