= Stefan Sauer =

German politician (born 1966)

Member of the Bundestag; for Groß-Gerau
- In office 24 October 2017 – 26 September 2021
- Preceded by: Franz Josef Jung
- Succeeded by: Melanie Wegling

Personal details
- Born: 14 January 1966 (age 60) Rüsselsheim, West Germany
- Party: Christian Democratic Union
- Education: Goethe University Frankfurt

Stefan Sauer (born 14 January 1966) is a German politician of the Christian Democratic Union (CDU) who served as a member of the Bundestag from the state of Hesse from 2017 to 2019.

== Political career ==
Sauer became member of the Bundestag in the 2017 German federal election. In parliament, he was a member of the Digital Agenda Committee and the Committee on Economic Cooperation and Development.

Sauer lost his seat in the 2021 German election.
