= Pascal Meiser =

German politician

Pascal Meiser MdB
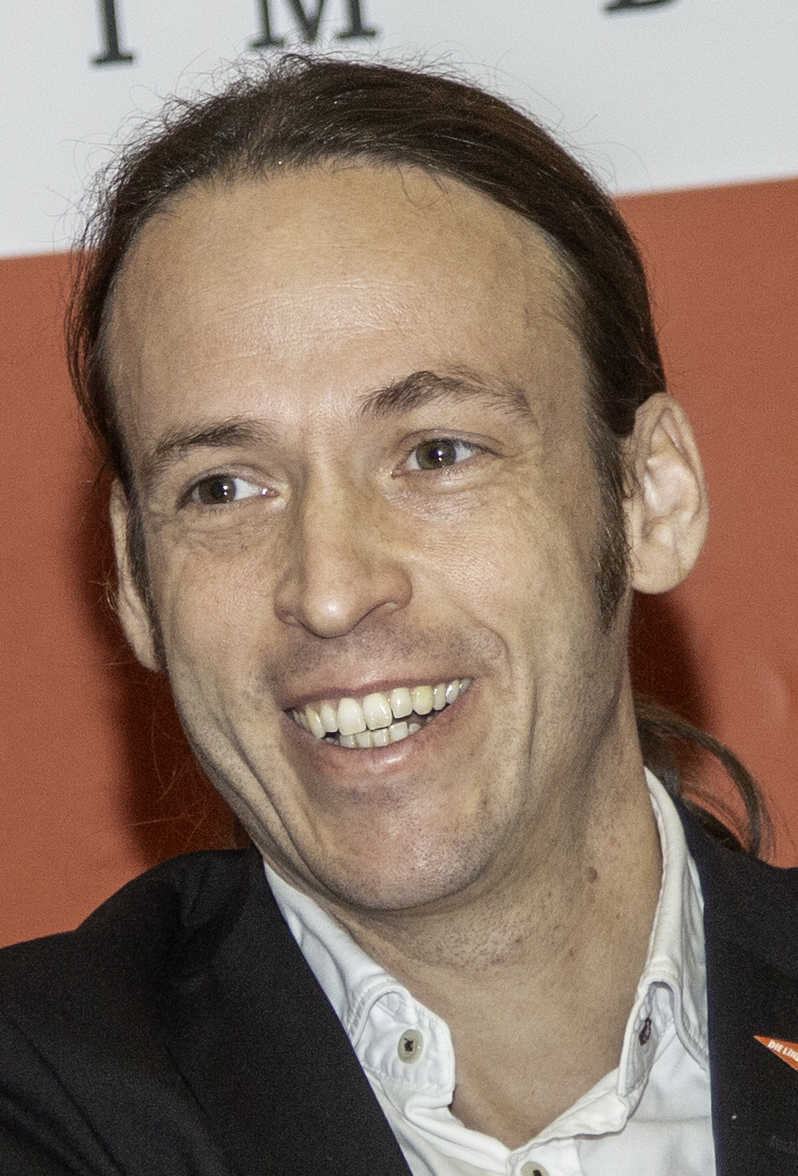
- Meiser in 2018

Member of the Bundestag; from Berlin
- Incumbent
- Assumed office 25 March 2025
- Preceded by: Canan Bayram
- Constituency: Berlin-Friedrichshain-Kreuzberg – Prenzlauer Berg East
- In office 24 October 2017 – 4 March 2024
- Preceded by: Multi-member district
- Succeeded by: Jörg Cezanne
- Constituency: State list

Personal details
- Born: 7 March 1975 (age 51) Saarbrücken, West Germany
- Party: Die Linke
- Education: University of Mainz; University of Leeds; Free University of Berlin

Pascal Meiser (born 7 March 1975) is a German politician. Born in Saarbrücken, Saarland, he represents The Left. Pascal Meiser served as a member of the Bundestag from the state of Berlin from 2017 until 2024.

== Life ==
In Lebach he passed his school-leaving examination at the Johannes-Kepler Gymnasium in 1994. He then studied political science, journalism and psychology at the Johannes-Gutenberg-University Mainz, the University of Leeds and the Free University Berlin. After graduating in political science in 2005, he trained as a trade union secretary at IG Metall. He became member of the bundestag after the 2017 German federal election. He is a member of the Committee for Economics and Energy. He is the spokesman for his group on services policy.

In the 2025 federal election, he won as a direct candidate in the Berlin-Friedrichshain-Kreuzberg – Prenzlauer Berg East constituency.
