= Melanie Wegling =

German politician

- Wegling in 2021

Member of the Bundestag; for Groß-Gerau
- In office 26 October 2021 – 25 March 2025
- Preceded by: Stefan Sauer
- Succeeded by: Seat vacant

Personal details
- Born: 7 January 1990 (age 36) Mainz, West Germany
- Party: Social Democratic
- Education: Peking University; Goethe University Frankfurt

Melanie Wegling (born 7 January 1990) is a German politician of the Social Democratic Party (SPD).

== Political career ==
Wegling became a member of the Bundestag in the 2021 German federal election, representing the constituency of Groß-Gerau. In parliament, she served on the Finance Committee.

Within her parliamentary group, Welling belonged to the Parliamentary Left, a left-wing movement.

== Other activities ==
- Nuclear Waste Disposal Fund (KENFO), Alternate Member of the Board of Trustees (since 2022)
