= Otto Zink =

German politician (1925–2008)

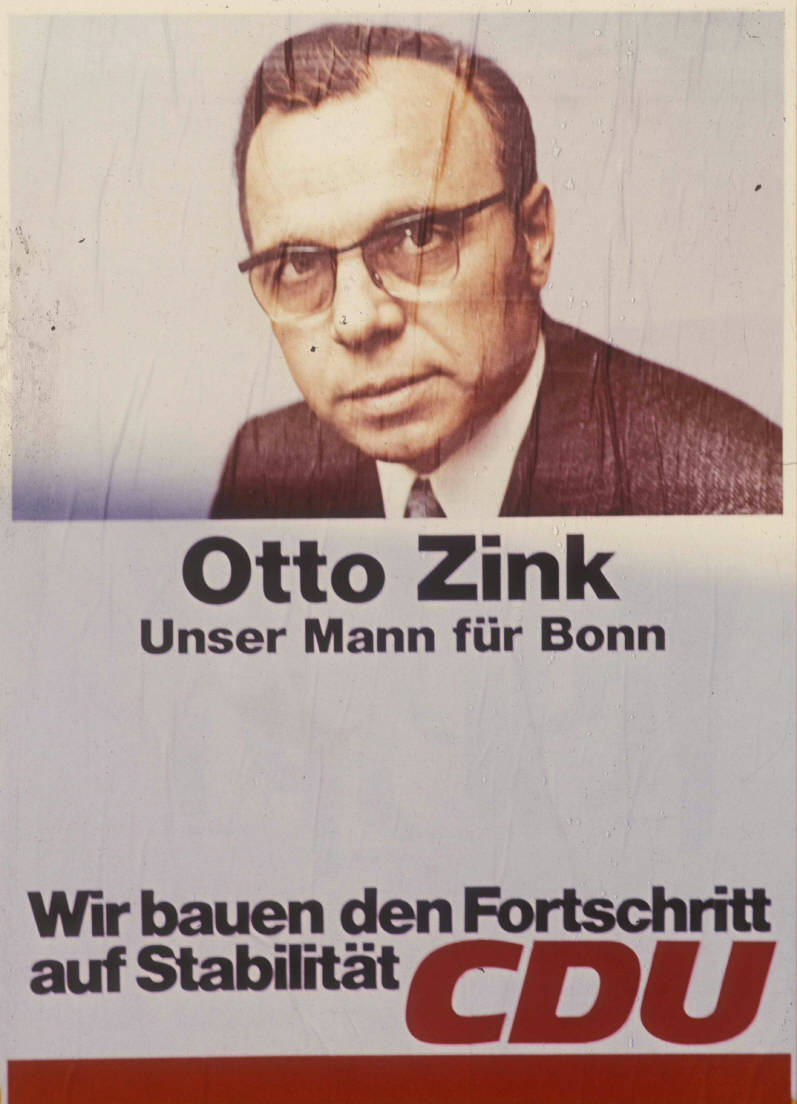
- Otto Zink on a campaign poster for the 1972 federal elections

Member of the Bundestag; from Hesse
- In office 19 October 1965 – 20 December 1990
- Preceded by: Multi-member district
- Succeeded by: Norbert Wieczorek
- Constituency: State list (1965–1983); Groß-Gerau (1983–1990)

Member of the Landtag of Hesse; for Wahlkreis 41
- In office 1 December 1962 – 18 October 1965
- Preceded by: Wilhelm Arnoul
- Succeeded by: Georg Lindner

Personal details
- Born: 31 October 1925 Rüsselsheim am Main, Germany
- Died: 9 May 2008 (aged 82)
- Party: Christian Democratic Union
- Children: 3

Otto Zink (31 October 1925 – 9 May 2008) was a German politician of the Christian Democratic Union (CDU) and former member of the German Bundestag.

== Political career ==
Zink joined the Junge Union in 1951 and joined the CDU in 1953. He was elected to the state executive committee and was deputy state chairman of the CDU Hessen from 1967 to 1992. From 1962 until his resignation on 18 October 1965, he was a member of the Hessian state parliament. He was a member of the Bundestag from 1965 to 1990. He had initially entered parliament via the Hesse state list and represented the constituency of Groß-Gerau from 1983 to 1990. From 9 September 1981 to 1987 he was Deputy Chairman of the Bundestag Committee for Labour and Social Affairs.

== Literature ==
Herbst, Ludolf; Jahn, Bruno (2002). Vierhaus, Rudolf (ed.). Biographisches Handbuch der Mitglieder des Deutschen Bundestages. 1949–2002 [Biographical Handbook of the Members of the German Bundestag. 1949–2002] (in German). München: De Gruyter - De Gruyter Saur. p. 1715. ISBN 978-3-11-184511-1.
