= Jörg Cezanne =

German politician

Jörg Cezanne MdB
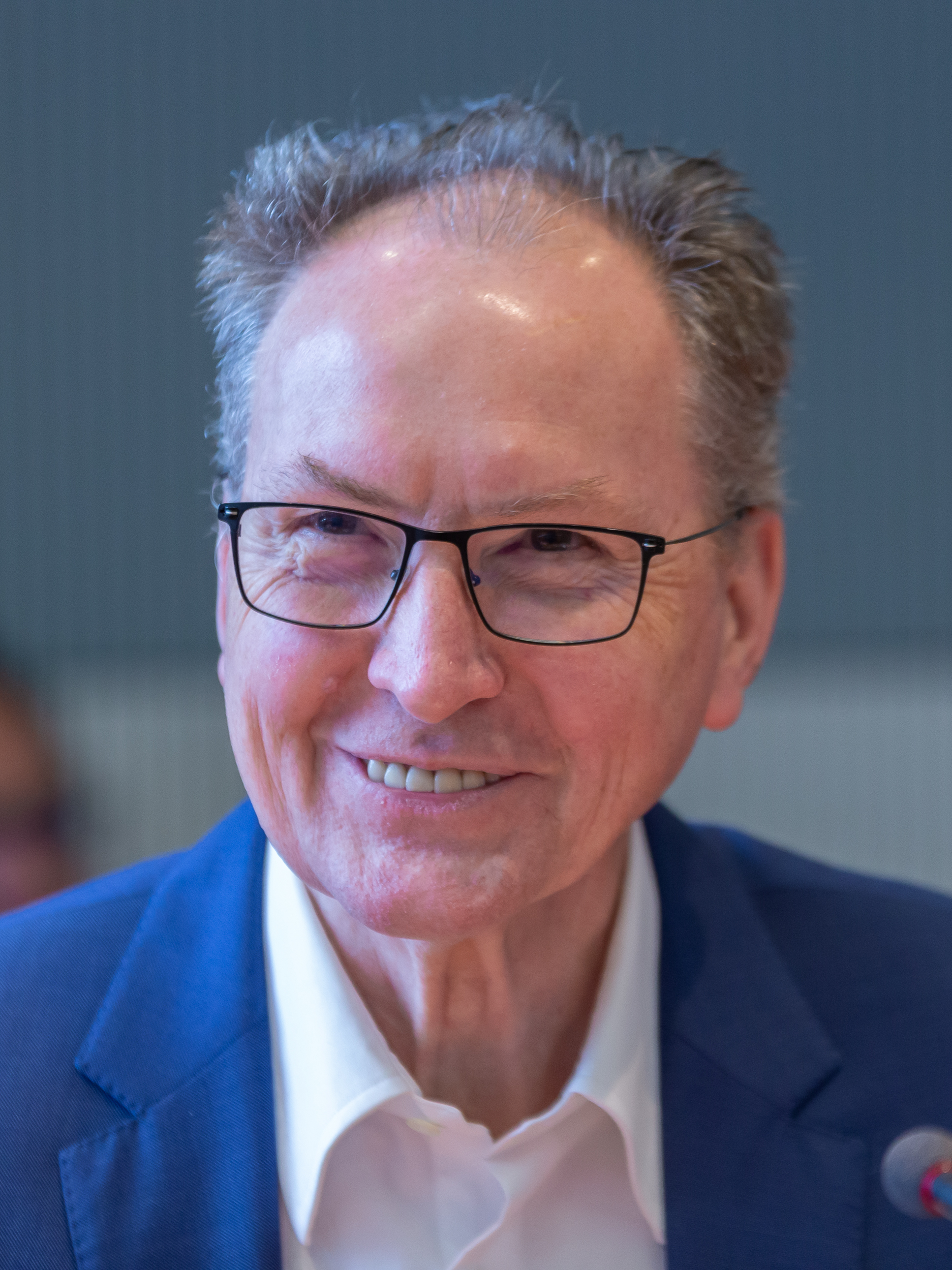
- Cezanne in 2020

Member of the Bundestag; from Hesse
- Incumbent
- Assumed office 4 March 2024
- Preceded by: Pascal Meiser
- Constituency: State list
- In office 24 October 2017 – 26 October 2021
- Constituency: State list

Personal details
- Born: 8 June 1958 (age 68) Frankfurt, West Germany
- Party: Die Linke
- Children: 1

Jörg Cezanne (born 8 June 1958) is a German politician. Born in Frankfurt, Hesse, he represents The Left. Jörg Cezanne served as a member of the Bundestag from the state of Hesse from 2017 to 2021.

== Early life and career ==
In 1978, he passed his Abitur at the Carl-Schurz-School in Frankfurt am Main and trained as a wholesale and foreign trade merchant from 1981 to 1982. From 1991 to 1996 he studied business administration (VWA), sociology, African linguistics and historical ethnology in Frankfurt am Main. From 1990 to 1996 he worked for the Rationalisation Board of Trustees of the German Economy e.V. (RKW) as a consultant for macroeconomic issues.

== Political career ==
Cezanne became member of the Bundestag after the 2017 German federal election. He is a member of the Finance Committee and the Committee for Transport and Digital Infrastructure. He is spokesman for his parliamentary group on air transport and shipping.
