= Daniela Billig =

German politician (born 1970)

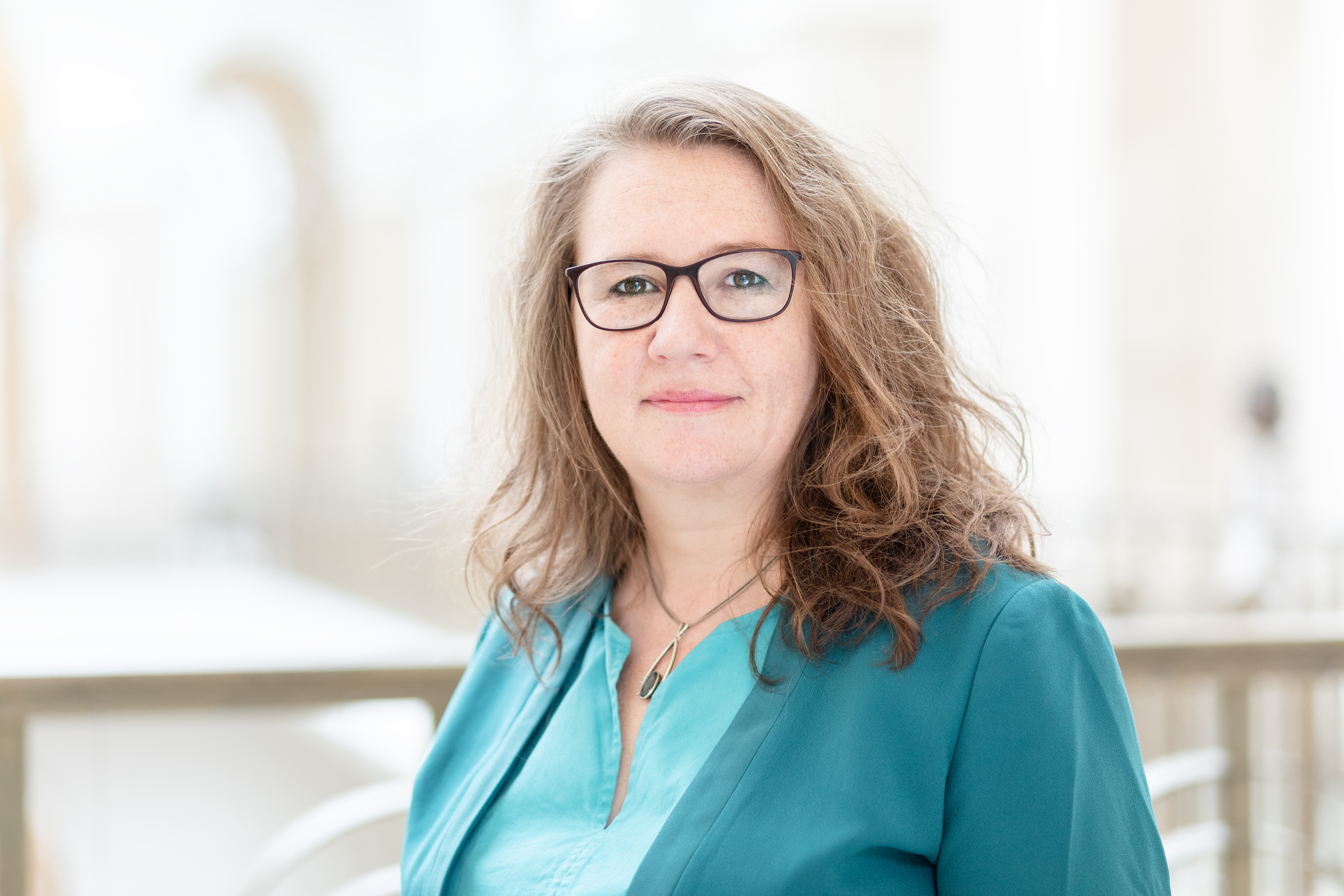
Daniel Billig (German politician)

Daniel Billig (born 2 June 1970) is a German politician for the Alliance '90/The Greens and since 2018 member of the Abgeordnetenhaus of Berlin, the state parliament of Berlin.

== Politics ==
Billig was born 1970 in the West German town of Monschau and studied at the Free University of Berlin. Billig became member of the Abgeordnetenhaus in 2018.
