= Friedrichshain-Kreuzberg 5 =

State electoral district of Germany

- Electoral district for the Berlin House of Representatives
- Friedrichshain-Kreuzberg 5 in 2026
- District: Friedrichshain-Kreuzberg
- Electorate: 34,106 (2026)

Current electoral district
- Party: The Left
- Member: Ekkehard Spiegel

Friedrichshain-Kreuzberg 5 is an electoral constituency (German: Wahlkreis) represented in the House of Representatives of Berlin. It elects one member via first-past-the-post voting.

== Geography ==
The constituency comprises the area between Petersburger/Warschauer Straße and Lichtenberg on the east–west axis, and between Kopernikus-/Wühlisch-/Boxhagener Straße and Straßmannstraße on the north–south axis, entirely within the borough of Friedrichshain-Kreuzberg.

There were 34,106 eligible voters in 2026.

== Members ==
Election	Member	Party	%
1999	Frederik Over	PDS	39.2
2001	Frederik Over	PDS	42.8
2006	Canan Bayram	SPD	28.0
2011	Canan Bayram	Green	32.4
2016	Canan Bayram	Green	34.0
2018	Daniela Billig	Green	
2021	Vasili Franco	Green	34.3
2023	Vasili Franco	Green	36.1
2026	Ekkehard Spiegel	Left	40.9

== Election results ==
=== 2026 election ===
State election (2026): Friedrichshain-Kreuzberg 5
Notes:	Blue background denotes the winner of the electorate vote. Pink background denotes a candidate elected from their party list. Yellow background denotes an electorate win by a list member, or other incumbent. A ✓ or ✗ denotes status of any incumbent, win or lose respectively.						
Party	Candidate	Votes	%	±%	Party votes	%	±%
Left	Ekkehard Spiegel	11,299	40.9	▲18.2	12,711	45.8	▲23.0
Greens	✗ Vasili Franco	7,630	27.6	▼11.6	5,910	21.3	▼15.4
SPD	Steffen Opitz	2,354	8.5	▼3.8	2,381	8.6	▼4.2
CDU	Björn Schlesiger	2,015	7.3	▼3.3	2,213	8.0	▼2.6
AfD	Christopher John Peter	1,559	5.6	▲2.2	1,620	5.8	▲2.3
Volt	Christoph König	863	3.1		793	2.8	▲1.3
BSW	Andreas Preisner	662	2.4		824	3.0	
Tierschutzpartei	Katrin Stephan	450	1.6	▼1.1	396	1.4	▼1.1
PARTEI	Anne-Kristin Damrau	394	1.4	▼2.9	276	1.0	▼2.0
FDP	Roman-Francesco Rogat	388	1.4	▼2.0	434	1.6	▼1.9
PdF					70	0.3	
ÖDP					36	0.1	
DKP					32	0.1	Steady
Bergpartei, die ÜberPartei	Björn Jarkowski	43	0.2		22	0.1	▼0.1
du.					20	0.1	▼0.2
SGP					7	0.0	Steady
Informal votes		233			145		
Total valid votes		27,657			27,745		
Turnout		27,890	81.8	▲15.2			
Left gain from Greens	Majority	3,669	13.3				

=== 2023 repeat election ===
Changes denoted below for the 2023 election are compared to the 2016 election, as the 2021 election was declared invalid.

State election (2023): Friedrichshain-Kreuzberg 5
Notes:	Blue background denotes the winner of the electorate vote. Pink background denotes a candidate elected from their party list. Yellow background denotes an electorate win by a list member, or other incumbent. A ✓ or ✗ denotes status of any incumbent, win or lose respectively.						
Party	Candidate	Votes	%	±%	Party votes	%	±%
Greens	Vasili Franco	6,833	36.1	▲4.0	6,433	33.9	▲6.1
Left	Steffen Zillich	4,143	21.9	▲1.2	4,147	21.9	▼3.0
SPD	Regine Laroche	2,731	14.4	▼2.8	2,564	13.5	▼3.3
CDU	Ilona Barrie	2,086	11.0	▲3.4	2,113	11.1	▲3.8
AfD	Christian von Hoffmeister	782	4.1	▼1.8	787	4.2	▼1.9
PARTEI	Annett Duden	740	3.9	▼0.7	560	3.0	▼2.0
FDP	Michael Heihsel	638	3.4	▲0.3	634	3.3	▼0.4
Tierschutzpartei	Steffen Mengel	538	2.8		504	2.7	▲1.0
Volt					311	1.6	
Klimaliste					146	0.8	
Pirates					109	0.6	▼3.5
Mieterpartei	Sabine Scheffer	197	1.0		84	0.4	
dieBasis	Susanne Ganz	146	0.8		101	0.5	
du.					70	0.4	
Bergpartei, die ÜberPartei					51	0.3	▼0.5
Humanists					51	0.3	
The Grays					46	0.2	
Gray Panthers					41	0.2	▼0.1
Team Todenhöfer					40	0.2	
DKP					35	0.2	Steady
Verjüngungsforschung					30	0.2	Steady
ÖDP	Hagen Gerwald Albers	41	0.2	▼0.3	25	0.1	▼0.1
Independent	Thorsten Alexander Buhl	38	0.2				
FW					19	0.1	
Bildet Berlin!					18	0.1	
SGP					11	0.1	▼0.1
NPD					10	0.1	Steady
The Pinks/Alliance 21					9	0.0	
LKR					3	0.0	▼0.1
BüSo					2	0.0	Steady
Informal votes		106			71		
Total valid votes		18,913			18,954		
Turnout		19,038	67.5	▼6.1			
Greens hold	Majority	2,690	14.2				

=== 2021 election (annulled) ===
The election in 2021 was annulled and rerun in 2023.

State election (2021): Friedrichshain-Kreuzberg 5
Notes:	Blue background denotes the winner of the electorate vote. Pink background denotes a candidate elected from their party list. Yellow background denotes an electorate win by a list member, or other incumbent. A ✓ or ✗ denotes status of any incumbent, win or lose respectively.						
Party	Candidate	Votes	%	±%	Party votes	%	±%
Greens	Vasili Franco	8,109	34.7	▲2.6	7,596	32.5	▲4.6
Left	Steffen Zillich	5,782	24.8	▲4.0	5,934	25.4	▲0.5
SPD	Regine Laroche	3,371	14.4	▼2.8	3,024	12.9	▼3.9
CDU	Ilona Barrie	1,623	7.0	▼0.7	1,569	6.7	▼0.6
FDP	Michael Heihsel	1,156	5.0	▲1.9	1,117	4.8	▲1.0
PARTEI	Annett Duden	1,102	4.7	▲0.1	829	3.5	▼1.4
AfD	Christian von Hoffmeister	769	3.3	▼2.7	769	3.3	▼2.8
Tierschutzpartei	Steffen Mengel	603	2.6		499	2.1	▲0.5
Volt					458	2.0	
dieBasis	Susanne Ganz	395	1.7		320	1.4	
Klimaliste					219	0.9	
Pirates					138	0.6	▼3.5
Mieterpartei	Sabine Scheffer	214	0.9		88	0.4	
Independent	Thorsten Alexander Buhl	130	0.6				
FW					110	0.5	
Bergpartei, die ÜberPartei					103	0.4	▼0.3
du.					91	0.4	
The Grays					87	0.4	
Humanists					76	0.3	
Team Todenhöfer					68	0.3	
Gray Panthers					65	0.3	Steady
APT					50	0.2	
DKP					42	0.2	Steady
ÖDP	Hagen Gerwald Albers	91	0.4	▼0.1	39	0.2	▼0.1
Verjüngungsforschung					28	0.1	Steady
Bildet Berlin!					23	0.1	
The Pinks/Alliance 21					16	0.1	
NPD					16	0.1	Steady
BüSo					8	0.0	Steady
SGP					8	0.0	▼0.1
LKR					5	0.0	▼0.1
Informal votes		160			118		
Total valid votes		23,345			23,395		
Turnout		23,568	82.2	▲8.7			
Greens hold	Majority	2,327	9.9				

== See also ==
- Politics of Berlin
- House of Representatives of Berlin
