= Hans-Christian Ströbele =

German politician and lawyer (1939–2022)

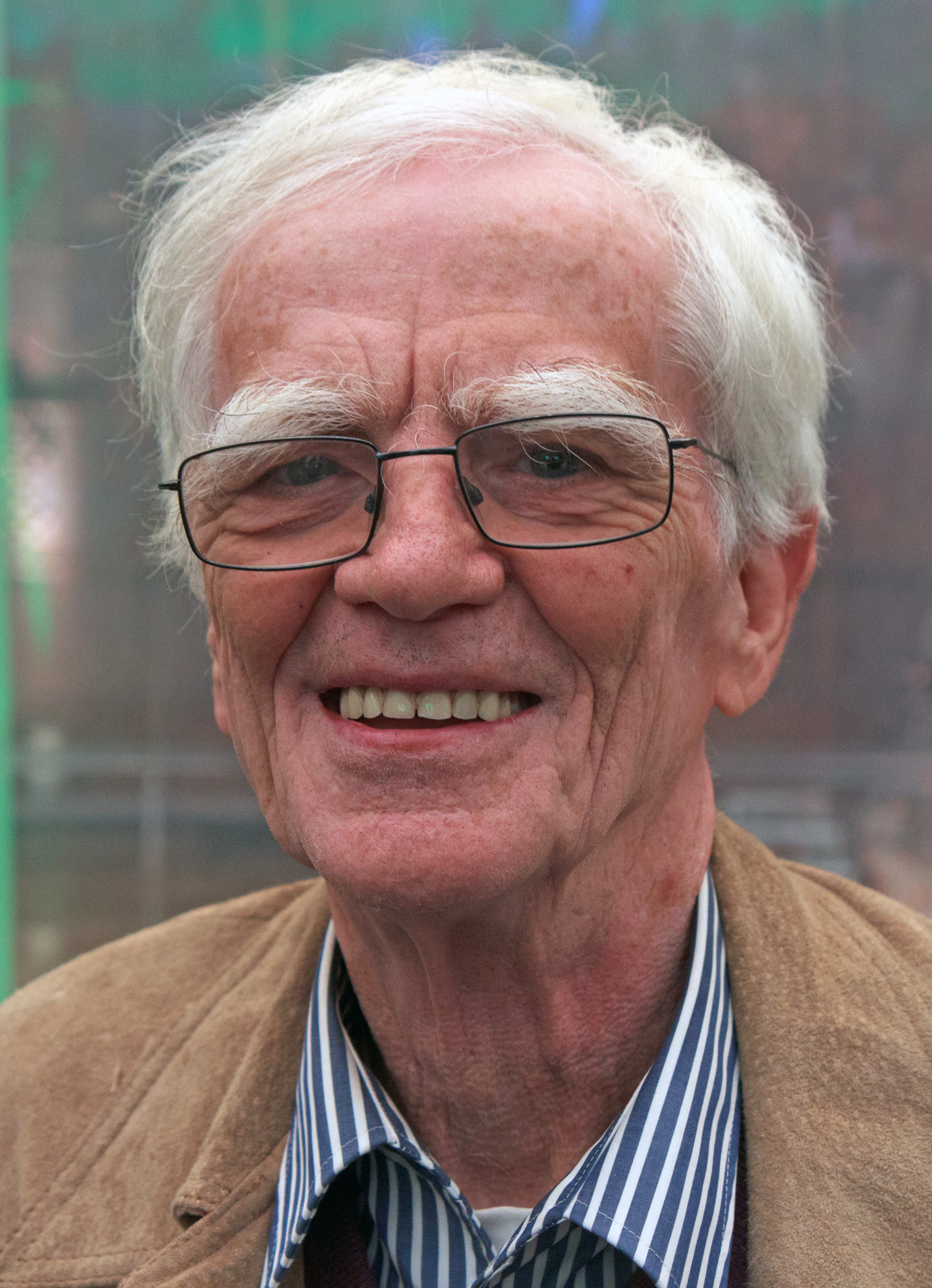
- Ströbele in 2017

Leader of The Greens
- In office June 1990 – February 1991 Serving with Renate Damus, Heide Rühle
- Preceded by: Ralf Fücks
- Succeeded by: Ludger Volmer

Member of the Bundestag; from Berlin
- In office 26 October 1998 – 24 October 2017
- Preceded by: Multi-member district
- Succeeded by: Canan Bayram
- Constituency: State list (1998–2002); Berlin-Friedrichshain-Kreuzberg – Prenzlauer Berg East (2002–2017)
- In office 31 March 1985 – 18 February 1987
- Preceded by: Dirk Schneider
- Succeeded by: Multi-member district
- Constituency: State list

Personal details
- Born: 7 June 1939 Halle, Saxony, Prussia, Nazi Germany (now Saxony-Anhalt, Germany)
- Died: 29 August 2022 (aged 83) Berlin, Germany
- Party: Alliance 90/The Greens (1980–2022)
- Other political affiliations: SDP (1970–1975); Alternative Liste für Demokratie und Umweltschutz (1978–1980)
- Spouse: Juliana Ströbele-Gregor (m. 1967)
- Education: Heidelberg University; Free University of Berlin
- Occupation: Politician; lawyer; publicist
- Website: stroebele-online.de

Hans-Christian Ströbele (German: [hans ˈkʁɪsti̯a(ː)n ˈʃtʁøːbələ]; 7 June 1939 – 29 August 2022) was a German politician and lawyer. He was a member of Alliance 90/The Greens, the German green party.

== Education and early career ==
Ströbele was born on 7 June 1939 in Halle, Saale, the son of a chemist. He obtained his Abitur in 1959 in Marl, Westphalia. Ströbele completed his military service in the early Bundeswehr's Air Force operations in Aurich as a reserve gunner.

Ströbele studied law and political science at Heidelberg University and at the Free University of Berlin. In 1967, he was a trainee lawyer in the offices of the lawyer Horst Mahler. He practiced law from 1969 in Berlin.

In the late 1960s Ströbele was involved in the student movement. From 1970 to 1974, he was a member of the SPD. He was also a member of the "Socialist Lawyers' Collective" for ten years, and rose to national fame defending militants of the urban guerrilla movement Red Army Faction and other political activists. He defended the Kommunard Dieter Kunzelmann, his colleague Mahler, who had joined the RAF, and finally also the leading figures of the terrorist group, Andreas Baader, Gudrun Ensslin and Ulrike Meinhof.

From 1977, Ströbele was involved in founding the left-wing daily newspaper Die Tageszeitung.

In 1983, Ströbele was convicted by the Berlin District Court of supporting terrorist groups through his smuggling of information between members serving in prison. The Court concluded that Ströbele had significantly assisted in keeping the groups active during their leaders' time in prison.

== Beginnings of the Green Party ==
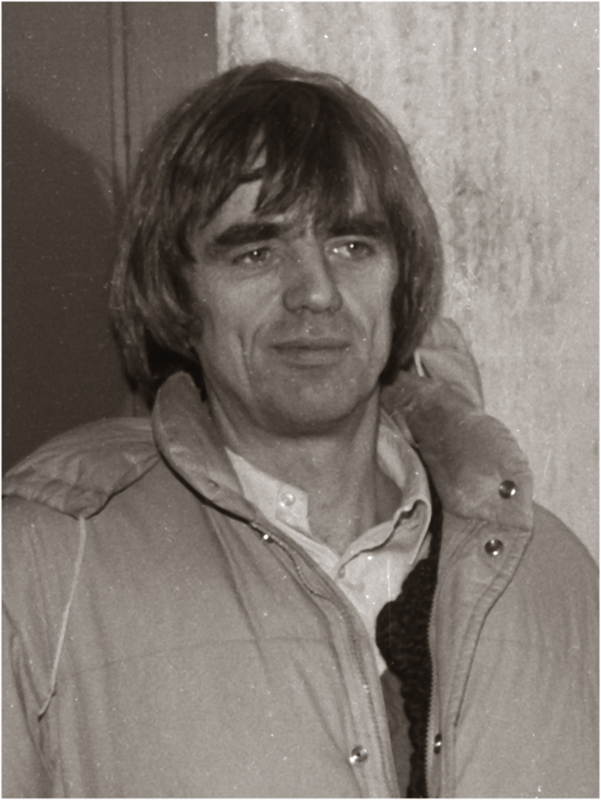
Ströbele in 1987

Ströbele co-founded the "Alternative List for Democracy and Environmental Protection," a predecessor to the Berlin chapter of the Greens. He was a member of the Bundestag from 31 March 1985 until 1987 (the end of the term). On the Berlin state level, he helped facilitate the red-green coalition of 1989/1990.

Ströbele became the party's spokesman in June 1990 but he stood down in February 1991 after opposing the Persian Gulf War. This included opposition to the delivery of Patriot missiles to Israel during an official visit of the party to that country. As of 1992 he continued as assemblyman of the Greens in the Tiergarten borough of Berlin.

== Member of Parliament (1998–2017) ==
In 1998, when the Greens became the junior partner in a government led by Gerhard Schröder, Ströbele entered the German parliament (Bundestag) through his place on the Green Party's electoral list. He served as a member of the Parliamentary Oversight Panel (PKGr), which provides parliamentary oversight of Germany's intelligence services. Between 2002 and 2005, Ströbele also served as one of the deputy chairpersons of the Green Party's parliamentary group in the Bundestag. He also served as a member of the Committee on Legal Affairs beginning in 2005.

During the early years of the Schröder government Ströbele became opposed to the politics of Green foreign minister Joschka Fischer, in particular the troop deployments in the Kosovo War (1999) as well as Operation Enduring Freedom (2001). Leading an effort to organize a 1999 national party congress to debate the party's stand on Kosovo, Ströbele collected 500 signatures from within the party to demand an end to NATO air strikes against Yugoslavia. In 2001, he urged the Greens to leave the coalition government.

During the pre-elections of the Greens to the 2002 German federal election, Ströbele was not given a promising place on the Green Party list, at that point generally assumed to be the only way a Green candidate could gain a seat in parliament according to Germany's proportional representation electoral system. In that situation he chose to campaign for a direct mandate in the Friedrichshain-Kreuzberg Prenzlauer Berg East constituency, holding positions that were remarkably different from the Green's official election campaign. Unexpectedly he won the direct mandate with 31.6% plurality vote becoming the first Green to hold a direct seat in parliament, and was the only such Green member of parliament from 2002 to 2017.

In the federal elections of 2005 he won another direct mandate, now with a 43.2% majority of the votes. Given his local reputation, other parties tried to counter him with creative campaigns (notably Vera Lengsfeld's "We have more to offer") for the federal elections of 2009 but again Ströbele won the direct mandate, now by 46.8% of the vote and again with 39.9% in 2013.

In 2011, Ströbele joined Gerhard Schick, Anton Hofreiter and Winfried Hermann in their successful 2011 constitutional complaint against the refusal of Chancellor Angela Merkel's government to provide information on the Deutsche Bahn and financial market supervision. In its judgment pronounced in 2017, the Federal Constitutional Court held that the government had indeed failed to fulfill its duty to give answers in response to parliamentary queries and to sufficiently substantiate the reasons.

In December 2016, Ströbele announced that he would not stand in the 2017 federal elections but instead resign from active politics by the end of the parliamentary term. In the 2017 election, Ströbele was succeeded by Alliance 90/The Greens candidate Canan Bayram in his former electoral district.

== Other activities ==
- taz Panter Stiftung, Member of the Board of Trustees (−2022)
- German Development Service (DED), Member of the Supervisory Board (1998–2011)

== Political positions ==
=== Military engagement ===
Ströbele consistently voted against the participation of the German Bundeswehr in the NATO-led security mission ISAF in Afghanistan. In 2010, he abstained from the vote on German participation in United Nations Interim Force in Lebanon but subsequently voted against its renewal.

In numerous cases, however, Ströbele had voted in favor of German participation in United Nations peacekeeping missions as well as in United Nations-mandated European Union peacekeeping missions on the African continent, such as in Darfur/Sudan (2010, 2011, 2012, 2013, 2014 and 2015), South Sudan (2011, 2012 and 2013), and the Central African Republic (2014). Yet he opposed Operation Atalanta in Somalia (2009, 2010, 2011, 2012, 2013), EUTM Mali (2013, 2014 and 2015) and EUTM Somalia (2014, 2015 and 2016). In 2014, he abstained from the vote on a German mandate for the peacekeeping mission EUFOR RCA in the Central African Republic.

=== Intelligence services ===
In 2006, Ströbele was one of the authors of a classified report prepared by a committee of the German Parliament that held closed-door hearings on the role of German intelligence during the Iraq War. The German report confirmed many details in a 2005 classified report by the United States Joint Forces Command which spoke of the German intelligence liaison officer working in coordination with American intelligence in Qatar. However, Ströbele contended that the parliamentary report was largely based on incomplete and partially censored information provided by the German intelligence agency BND and wrote a dissenting comment on the report which he posted on his web site.

On 31 October 2013, Ströbele – then the longest serving member of the parliamentary committee that oversees German intelligence – and journalist Georg Mascolo met with Edward Snowden in Moscow to discuss the possibility of the NSA whistleblower testifying before the German parliamentary committee investigating foreign spying in Germany and obtaining access to cell phone calls on German government officials, including Chancellor Angela Merkel.

=== Visit of Pope Benedict XVI ===
When Pope Benedict XVI addressed members of the German Parliament during his first official visit to Berlin in 2011, Ströbele – who had opposed the pope's appearance due to his support for women in the church, gay rights and victims of sexual abuse by priests – stood up and left as the speech began. Benedict then singled his party out for praise, saying that "the emergence of the ecological movement in German politics since the 1970s" represented a "cry for fresh air which must not be ignored or pushed aside."

=== Eurozone crisis ===
During the Eurozone crisis, Ströbele was the only member of the Green Party's parliamentary group to vote against Germany's support for implementing a series of financial support measures such as the European Financial Stability Facility (EFSF) and European Stability Mechanism (ESM) in June 2012, citing constitutional objections.

=== Arms exports ===
Following a controversial 2011 deal to export German tanks to Saudi Arabia, Ströbele threatened to appeal to the Federal Constitutional Court should the federal government continue to refuse to release any information. In 2014, he – alongside fellow Green Party parliamentarians Katja Keul and Claudia Roth – lodged a complaint before the Federal Constitutional Court, arguing that it was unconstitutional for the government to keep the Bundestag in the dark about planned arms deals because it prevented the parliament from doing its job of keeping the government in check. The court ruled that while the government did not have to disclose information about planned defense exports, it did have an obligation to provide the Bundestag with details, on request, once specific arms deals had been approved.

== Later life ==
Ströbele left the Bundestag in 2017 at the age of 79 for health reasons; his health continued to deteriorate during his later years. Upon his death at the age of 83, his lawyer released the statement:

He decided himself that he no longer wanted to continue the long ordeal that his illness had imposed on him and he reduced life-sustaining measures. He was fully conscious to the last. Not the spirit, the body became his torment and left him on August 29, 2022. [Er hat selbst entschieden, dass er den langen Leidensweg, den ihm seine Erkrankungen zugemutet hat, nicht mehr fortsetzen wollte und lebenserhaltende Maßnahmen reduziert. Er war bis zuletzt bei vollem Bewusstsein. Nicht der Geist, der Körper wurde ihm zur Qual und hat ihn am 29. August 2022 verlassen.]
