= Bavaria (Bundestag electoral district) =

Electoral district in Germany

- Bayern
- Electoral District for the Bundestag
- Location of Bavaria within Germany
- State: Bavaria
- Population: 13,248,928 (2024)
- Electorate: 9,481,659 (2025)
- Area: 70,542 km^{2} (2022)

Current Electoral District
- Created: 1949
- Seats: List: – (2025–present) (Note: The number of seats allocated to the upper-tier state electoral districts is not fixed but is dependent on the national results at each election.); 93 (2017–2025); 92 (2013–2017); – (1957–2013); 91 (1953–1957); 78 (1949–1953)
- Members: List (Note: State-list members only.): Lisa Badum (Grüne); Karl Bär (Grüne); Christoph Birghan (AfD); Peter Boehringer (AfD); Victoria Broßart (Grüne); Erhard Brucker (AfD); Agnes Conrad (Linke); Sabine Dittmar (SPD); Leon Eckert (Grüne); Peter Felser (AfD); Nicole Gohlke (Linke); Rainer Groß (AfD); Ates Gürpinar (Linke); Ingo Hahn (AfD); Gabriela Heinrich (SPD); Heike Heubach (SPD); Anton Hofreiter (Grüne); Luke Hoß (Linke); Gerrit Huy (AfD); Bärbel Kofler (SPD); Rainer Kraft (AfD); Anette Kramme (SPD); Rebecca Lenhard (Grüne); Andreas Mayer (AfD); Reinhard Mixl (AfD); Sascha Müller (Grüne); Gerold Otten (AfD); Tobias Peterka (AfD); Stephan Protschka (AfD); Lukas Rehm (AfD); Sebastian Roloff (SPD); Claudia Roth (Grüne); Rainer Rothfuß (AfD); Bernd Rützel (SPD); Jamila Schäfer (Grüne); Johannes Schätzl (SPD); Raimond Scheirich (AfD); Carina Schießl (AfD); Manfred Schiller (AfD); Christoph Schmid (SPD); Stefan Schmidt (Grüne); Marlene Schönberger (Grüne); Evelyn Schötz (Linke); Michael Schrodi (SPD); Bernd Schuhmann (AfD); Andreas Schwarz (SPD); Tobias Teich (AfD); Carsten Träger (SPD); Bastian Treuheit (AfD); Aaron Valent (Linke); Sarah Vollath (Linke); Niklas Wagener (Grüne); Carolin Wagner (SPD); Johannes Wagner (Grüne); Carmen Wegge (SPD); Wolfgang Wiehle (AfD); Tina Winklmann (Grüne)
- Constituencies: List: Altötting; Amberg; Ansbach; Aschaffenburg; Augsburg-Land; Augsburg-Stadt; Bad Kissingen; Bad Tölz-Wolfratshausen – Miesbach; Bamberg; Bayreuth; Coburg; Deggendorf; Donau-Ries; Erding – Ebersberg; Erlangen; Freising; Fürstenfeldbruck; Fürth; Hof; Ingolstadt; Kulmbach; Landshut; Main-Spessart; Memmingen – Unterallgäu; Munich East; Munich Land; Munich North; Munich South; Munich West/Centre; Neu-Ulm; Nuremberg North; Nuremberg South; Oberallgäu; Ostallgäu; Passau; Regensburg; Rosenheim; Roth; Rottal-Inn; Schwandorf; Schweinfurt; Starnberg – Landsberg am Lech; Straubing; Traunstein; Weiden; Weilheim; Würzburg
- Created from: List: Franconia; Lower Bavaria–Upper Palatinate; Upper Bavaria–Swabia

Bavaria (German: Bayern) is one of the 16 multi-member upper-tier state electoral districts of the Bundestag, one of the two national legislatures of Germany. The district was created in 1949 following the restoration of democracy in West Germany with the creation of the Federal Republic of Germany. It is conterminous with the state of Bavaria. At the 2025 federal election the constituency had 9,481,659 registered electors and elected 101 of the 630 members of the Bundestag. The district's members are elected using the mixed-member proportional representation electoral system and is currently divided into 47 lower-tier constituencies.

== Electoral system ==
Members of the Bundestag for Bavaria are elected using a complex mixed-member proportional representation electoral system that has evolved over time.

1949 Electoral Act
The Parliamentary Council of West Germany, a constituent assembly elected by Parliaments of the eleven states of West Germany, could not agree upon the electoral law to be included in the Basic Law, the constitution of the nascent nation. The Council instead established a special committee to draft an electoral law for the first federal election. In February 1949 the Council adopted an electoral law which would establish a mixed electoral system with 50% of seats elected using the first-past-the-post system and the other 50% via federal lists, and there would no electoral threshold. The Allied-occupying authorities objected to the new electoral as they considered that the Parliamentary Council was not competent to enact electoral law and only the states could do so. The minister presidents of the states referred the issue back to the Parliamentary Council which passed another electoral law on 10 May 1949 with a two-thirds majority. The Allied military governors objected to several parts of the new law and ordered changes to be made. In response, the minister presidents promulgated an amended electoral law on 15 June 1949, the "Electoral Act for the first Bundestag and the first Federal Assembly of the Federal Republic of Germany" (Wahlgesetz zum ersten Bundestag und zur ersten Bundesversammlung der Bundesrepublik Deutschland). On 5 August 1949 the minister presidents promulgated an amendment to the electoral law in relation to method of calculating the seat allocation in the upper-tier electoral districts.

The amended law provided for 400 members of the Bundestag of which 78 would be elected from Bavaria. Each state government was to distribute the seats in their respective states with 60% of seats being allocated to constituency seats or direct mandates (Direktmandat) elected from lower-tier single-member constituencies with the remaining 40% of seats being state seats allocated to state lists (Landesliste or Landeswahlvorschlag) elected from upper-tier multi-member electoral districts. In the lower-tier constituencies the candidate with the most votes was elected (plurality voting). In order to calculate the state seats won by each party, the total seats allocated to each state, excluding constituency seats won by independents and parties that did not submit a state-list nomination, were distributed to parties using the D'Hondt method. Only parties that had received at least 5% of the votes in the state or had won at least one constituency seat in the state (the basic mandate clause Grundmandatsklausel) were included in this calculation. Then the number of constituency seats won by the party in the state were deducted to determine the number of state seats won by each party. If the number of constituency seats won by a party exceeded the calculated number of seats it was entitled to in the state, it was permitted to retain the overhang seats (Überhangmandat). Finally, the state seats won by each party were distributed amongst its candidates in the order they appeared on the state list (closed list).

Vacancies in constituency seats were filled by by-elections until January 1953 when an amendment to the electoral law abolished by-elections and instead vacancies were filled from the party's state list.

1953 Electoral Act
In July 1953 a new electoral law, the "Electoral Act for the Second Bundestag and the Federal Assembly" (Wahlgesetz zum zweiten Bundestag und zur Bundesversammlung), was enacted. The new law provided for 484 members of the Bundestag of which 91 would be elected from Bavaria. The split between constituency seats and state seats was changed from 60:40 to 50:50 as the Parliamentary Council had envisaged in 1949. Voters had two votes instead of one - with their first vote (Erststimme) they chose a candidate in the lower-tier constituency and with their second vote (Zweitstimme) they chose a state list in the upper-tier electoral district. Split-ticket voting (panachage) was permitted. The two thresholds required to compete for state seats were transferred from the state level to the national level. Parties representing recognised national minorities (Nationale Minderheit) were exempt from the threshold requirements.

1956 Electoral Act
The "Bundeswahlgesetz" (Federal Election Act) enacted in May 1956 was the first permanent electoral law in post-war West Germany (the 1949 and 1953 Acts were provisional and only applied to the subsequent federal election). In December 1956 the Act was amended in relation to size of the Bundestag following the accession of Saarland to the federal republic. The Bundestag was to have 494 members (excluding the 22 non-voting members from West Berlin) but, unlike the previous Acts, seats weren't allocated to individual states which in effect meant seats were distributed amongst participating parties based on the national vote rather than on the state vote as previously. The requirement to have won at least one constituency seat nationally to compete for state seats was increased to at least three constituency seats nationally. The 5% threshold and exemption for parties representing recognised national minorities remained as previously.

The calculation of the number of state seats won by each party was carried out in three stages. Firstly, the total number of Bundestag seats - excluding constituency seats won by independents, parties that did not submit a state-list nomination and parties that did not meet the threshold requirements - were allocated amongst parties that met the threshold requirements based on their national total of second votes and using the D'Hondt method. Secondly, the seats allocated to each party was distributed to the upper-tier electoral district level based on their state total of second votes and using the D'Hondt method. Finally, the constituency seats won by the party in the state were deducted to determine the number of state seats won by each party. Parties retained overhang seats as previously.

In February 1964 the Act was amended to increase the size of the Bundestag from 494 to 496.

1975 Electoral Act
A new version of the Act was enacted in September 1975 but made no changes to electoral system. The method for allocating state seats was changed from D'Hondt to the largest remainder method with Hare quota in March 1985.

In June 1990 the Act was amended to allow the accession of the East German states into the federal republic, increasing the size of the Bundestag from 496 to 656. The Federal Constitutional Court ruled in September 1990 that the 5% national threshold violated the principle of equal voting rights as political parties from East Germany needed to increase their votes by a relatively larger amount than parties from West Germany in order to meet the threshold in a unified Germany. In response, the electoral law was amended in October 1990 to have separate 5% thresholds for East and West Germany and passing either one would allow the party to compete for upper-tier electoral district seats in the whole of Germany. This change was transitional and only applied to the subsequent election.

1993 Electoral Act
A new version of the Act was enacted in July 1993 but made no changes to electoral system. In November 1996 the Act was amended to decrease the size of the Bundestag from 656 to 598 but this change wasn't applied until the 2002 federal election. The method for allocating state seats was changed from largest remainder to the Sainte-Laguë method (also known as the Schepers method) in March 2008.

The existence of overhang seats at state level together with seats being allocated initially at the national level led to the possibility of negative vote weight - the more second votes a party received in a state in which it had overhang seats, the fewer overall seats it would end up receiving. The Federal Constitutional Court ruled in July 1998 that this violated the princicple of equal votes enshrined in the Basic Law. In response, the Act was amended in December 2011 but in July 2012 the Constitutional Court ruled this too violated the Basic Law as it still raised the possibility of negative vote weight. The Act was amended again in May 2013 to meet the Constitutional Court's ruling. The main changes were that the seats were allocated initially based on second votes at the state level rather than on the national level, and the introduction levelling seats (Ausgleichsmandat) to ensure that the final overall seat allocation was proportional to the second votes. The threshold limits and the method of electing lower-tier constituency seats remained unchanged.

The calculation of the state seats won by each party was carried out in multiple, circular stages. Firstly, the total number of seats in the Bundestag (598) was distributed amongst the upper-tier electoral districts based on their population of German citizens. Secondly, the total seats allocated to each upper-tier electoral district - excluding seats won at the lower-tier constituency level by independents, parties that did not submit a state-list nomination and parties that did not meet the threshold requirements - were allocated amongst parties that met the national threshold requirements based on their total second votes in the state and using the Sainte-Laguë method. Then the number of constituency seats won by the party in the state were deducted to determine the initial allocation of state seats won by each party. Parties retained overhang seats as previously. Each party's minimum seat entitlement was the sum of the initial allocation of state seats plus the number of constituency seats won by the party, including overhang seats. Next, the ratio of second votes to minimum seat entitlement was calculated for each party. Then, each party's second votes total was divided by the lowest of these ratios to determine the final national seat allocation. The difference between the final national seat allocation and the minimum seat entitlement was the number of levelling seats. The final national allocation was then distributed to the upper-tier electoral district level based on the number of second votes received by that party in each state but ensuring that each party received at least as many seats as the number of constituency seats the party won in the state. Finally, the number of constituency seats won by the party in the state were deducted to determine the final allocation of state seats won by each party. This final allocation of state seats could be lower than the initial allocation. One new clause in the Act was that if a party received more than half of the total number of second votes received by parties that met the threshold requirements, but did not receive more than half of the seats, additional seats were to be allocated to that party, using the same top-down method as above, until it received one seat more than half of the total number of seats in the Bundestag.

The existence overhang seats plus changes in the party system in Germany meant more and more levelling seats were required to achieve proportionality. In order to mitigate this, the Act was amended in November 2020 so that any overhang seats in excess of three for a party in a state would be off-set by a commensurate reduction in the party's state seats in other states. At the 2021 federal election the Christian Social Union received 12 overhang mandates in Bavaria but, as it only competed in that state, its nine excess overhang seats could not be off-set by a reductions in state seats elsewhere and as result 104 levelling seats were needed to achieve proportionality. This, together with a total 34 overhang seats, took the size of the Bundestag to 736, the largest in the democratic world.

The Act was amended in June 2023 to eliminate overhang seats, and therefore the need for levelling seats. The size of the Bundestag was increased from 598 to 630 whilst the basic mandate clause was abolished. The latter change was challenged in the Constitutional Court which ruled on 30 July 2024 that the 5% threshold without any exceptions was unconstitutional and ordered the reinstatement of the basic mandate clause on an interim basis. The calculation of the number of state seats won by each party was similar to the process used prior to the 2013 reform, with the exception that if a party won more constituency seats in a state than it was entitled to, its constituency winners were excluded from the Bundestag in decreasing order of their first vote share.

== Constituencies ==
=== Current ===
Bavaria is currently divided into 47 lower-tier constituencies:

- 211. Altötting
- 212. Erding – Ebersberg
- 213. Freising
- 214. Fürstenfeldbruck
- 215. Ingolstadt
- 216. Munich North
- 217. Munich East
- 218. Munich South
- 219. Munich West/Centre
- 220. Munich Land
- 221. Rosenheim
- 222. Bad Tölz-Wolfratshausen – Miesbach
- 223. Starnberg – Landsberg am Lech
- 224. Traunstein
- 225. Weilheim
- 226. Deggendorf
- 227. Landshut
- 228. Passau
- 229. Rottal-Inn
- 230. Straubing
- 231. Amberg
- 232. Regensburg
- 233. Schwandorf
- 234. Weiden
- 235. Bamberg
- 236. Bayreuth
- 237. Coburg
- 238. Hof
- 239. Kulmbach
- 240. Ansbach
- 241. Erlangen
- 242. Fürth
- 243. Nuremberg North
- 244. Nuremberg South
- 245. Roth
- 246. Aschaffenburg
- 247. Bad Kissingen
- 248. Main-Spessart
- 249. Schweinfurt
- 250. Würzburg
- 251. Augsburg-Stadt
- 252. Augsburg-Land
- 253. Donau-Ries
- 254. Neu-Ulm
- 255. Memmingen – Unterallgäu
- 256. Oberallgäu
- 257. Ostallgäu

=== Former ===
- Cham
- Forchheim
- Memmingen
- Miesbach
- Munich Centre
- Nürnberg – Fürth
- Schwabach
- Starnberg
- Vilshofen
- Weißenburg

== Election results ==
=== Summary ===
Election	Left Linke / PDS			Social Democrats SPD			Greens Grüne / AUD			Free Democrats FDP			Bavaria BP			Social Christians CSU			Free Voters FW			Alternative AfD			National Democrats NPD / DRP		
Election	Votes	%	Seats	Votes	%	Seats	Votes	%	Seats	Votes	%	Seats	Votes	%	Seats	Votes	%	Seats	Votes	%	Seats	Votes	%	Seats	Votes	%	Seats
2025	456,935	5.73%	7	920,675	11.55%	14	957,435	12.01%	14	333,257	4.18%	0	12,278	0.15%	0	2,964,028	37.18%	44	345,840	4.34%	0	1,515,731	19.01%	22			
2021	210,838	2.78%	4	1,361,242	17.98%	23	1,067,830	14.10%	19	798,591	10.55%	14	32,790	0.43%	0	2,402,827	31.74%	45	566,880	7.49%	0	679,915	8.98%	12	5,743	0.08%	0
2017	450,803	6.10%	7	1,130,931	15.30%	18	722,116	9.77%	11	751,248	10.16%	12	58,037	0.79%	0	2,869,688	38.82%	46	199,198	2.69%	0	916,300	12.39%	14	20,611	0.28%	0
2013	248,920	3.78%	4	1,314,009	19.97%	22	552,818	8.40%	9	334,158	5.08%	0	57,395	0.87%	0	3,243,569	49.29%	56	180,649	2.75%	0	283,570	4.31%	0	56,737	0.86%	0
2009	429,371	6.45%	6	1,120,018	16.84%	16	719,265	10.81%	10	976,379	14.68%	14	48,311	0.73%	0	2,830,238	42.55%	45							87,591	1.32%	0
2005	244,701	3.45%	3	1,806,548	25.46%	24	559,941	7.89%	7	673,817	9.50%	9	35,543	0.50%	0	3,494,309	49.25%	46							95,196	1.34%	0
2002	49,515	0.67%	0	1,922,551	26.11%	26	562,483	7.64%	7	332,675	4.52%	4	9,379	0.13%	0	4,315,080	58.61%	58							16,796	0.23%	0
1998	46,301	0.66%	1	2,401,021	34.43%	34	413,909	5.93%	6	354,620	5.08%	5	28,107	0.40%	0	3,324,480	47.67%	47							7,219	0.10%	0
1994	36,575	0.55%	1	1,983,979	29.64%	29	419,763	6.27%	6	430,125	6.43%	6	42,491	0.63%	0	3,427,196	51.21%	50									
1990	13,722	0.22%	0	1,697,970	26.67%	26	293,039	4.60%	0	551,892	8.67%	9	31,315	0.49%	0	3,302,980	51.88%	51							14,218	0.22%	0
1987				1,816,885	26.96%	24	518,122	7.69%	7	545,865	8.10%	7	26,367	0.39%	0	3,715,827	55.14%	49							42,813	0.64%	0
1983				2,014,399	28.92%	26	323,901	4.65%	4	433,652	6.23%	6				4,140,865	59.45%	53							20,109	0.29%	0
1980				2,220,953	32.73%	30	89,322	1.32%	0	532,620	7.85%	7				3,908,459	57.59%	52							16,308	0.24%	0
1976				2,201,692	32.79%	29	5,242	0.08%	0	419,335	6.25%	6				4,027,499	59.99%	53							29,085	0.43%	0
1972				2,483,136	37.83%	33				399,554	6.09%	5				3,615,183	55.08%	48							47,140	0.72%	0
1969				1,983,020	34.60%	31				232,880	4.06%	4	49,694	0.87%	0	3,115,652	54.37%	49							303,828	5.30%	0
1965				1,869,467	33.14%	30	11,238	0.20%	0	413,744	7.33%	7				3,136,506	55.60%	49							149,975	2.66%	0
1961				1,652,642	30.12%	28				479,830	8.74%	8				3,014,471	54.94%	50							28,699	0.52%	0
1957				1,394,811	26.45%	25				240,695	4.56%	4				3,015,892	57.19%	53							24,902	0.47%	0
1953				1,184,262	23.34%	25				315,494	6.22%	6	465,641	9.18%	0	2,427,387	47.84%	52							78,162	1.54%	0
1949				1,075,416	22.75%	18				404,145	8.55%	7	986,478	20.87%	17	1,380,448	29.20%	24									

=== Detailed ===
Party has received at least 5% of the vote nationally or won three (Note: One seat at the 1953 election.) seats at the lower-tier constituency level and is entitled to compete for seats at the upper-tier state level.
Party represents a recognised minority and is entitled to compete for seats at the upper-tier state level.

==== 2020s ====
===== 2025 =====
Results of the 2025 federal election held on 23 February 2025:

Party		Second votes per region							Total votes	%	Seats				
Party		Lower Bavaria	Lower Franc- onia	Middle Franc- onia	Swabia	Upper Bavaria	Upper Franc- onia	Upper Pala- tinate	Total votes	%	Constituency			Stat.	Tot.
Party		Lower Bavaria	Lower Franc- onia	Middle Franc- onia	Swabia	Upper Bavaria	Upper Franc- onia	Upper Pala- tinate	Total votes	%	Win.	For.	Ele.	Stat.	Tot.
Christian Social Union in Bavaria	CSU	292,740	334,540	360,872	433,617	1,004,061	262,304	275,894	2,964,028	37.18%	47	-3	44	0	44
Alternative for Germany	AfD	198,848	163,043	187,004	234,922	417,557	149,475	164,882	1,515,731	19.01%	0	0	0	22	22
Alliance 90/The Greens	Grüne	50,037	91,583	142,989	122,377	430,834	60,212	59,403	957,435	12.01%	0	0	0	14	14
Social Democratic Party of Germany	SPD	66,657	102,170	147,164	120,332	323,261	85,105	75,986	920,675	11.55%	0	0	0	14	14
Die Linke	Linke	29,388	49,812	77,340	63,123	165,324	37,748	34,200	456,935	5.73%	0	0	0	7	7
Free Voters	FW	65,117	28,520	30,882	54,270	94,120	28,461	44,470	345,840	4.34%	0	0	0	0	0
Free Democratic Party	FDP	25,274	33,351	40,647	46,385	141,307	23,797	22,496	333,257	4.18%	0	0	0	0	0
Sahra Wagenknecht Alliance	BSW	23,289	26,114	37,173	37,882	80,874	21,714	19,472	246,518	3.09%	0	0	0	0	0
Human Environment Animal Protection Party		4,913	7,034	9,452	9,600	20,462	5,706	4,702	61,869	0.78%	0	0	0	0	0
Volt Germany	Volt	2,538	5,758	7,514	6,086	21,293	4,129	3,353	50,671	0.64%	0	0	0	0	0
Ecological Democratic Party	ÖDP	4,379	2,840	4,019	5,041	12,452	1,884	2,752	33,367	0.42%	0	0	0	0	0
Die PARTEI		2,072	3,244	4,327	5,022	11,337	2,473	2,077	30,552	0.38%	0	0	0	0	0
Grassroots Democratic Party of Germany	dieBasis	1,861	3,124	3,510	6,026	9,899	2,153	2,270	28,843	0.36%	0	0	0	0	0
Bavaria Party	BP	1,779	1,109	906	1,746	4,811	703	1,224	12,278	0.15%	0	0	0	0	0
Bündnis Deutschland	BD	510	960	1,002	1,110	2,059	642	654	6,937	0.09%	0	0	0	0	0
Party of Humanists	PdH	358	594	825	784	2,046	465	394	5,466	0.07%	0	0	0	0	0
Marxist–Leninist Party of Germany	MLPD	86	217	324	282	480	149	114	1,652	0.02%	0	0	0	0	0
Valid votes		769,846	854,013	1,055,950	1,148,605	2,742,177	687,120	714,343	7,972,054	100.00%	47	-3	44	57	101
Rejected votes		2,135	3,122	3,722	3,865	7,351	2,194	2,114	24,503	0.31%					
Total polled		771,981	857,135	1,059,672	1,152,470	2,749,528	689,314	716,457	7,996,557	84.34%					
Registered electors		934,771	1,000,451	1,266,801	1,374,896	3,238,288	817,450	849,002	9,481,659						
Turnout		82.59%	85.67%	83.65%	83.82%	84.91%	84.32%	84.39%	84.34%						

The following candidates were elected:

- State seats - Lisa Badum (Grüne); Karl Bär (Grüne); Christoph Birghan (AfD); Peter Boehringer (AfD); Victoria Broßart (Grüne); Erhard Brucker (AfD); Agnes Conrad (Linke); Sabine Dittmar (SPD); Leon Eckert (Grüne); Peter Felser (AfD); Nicole Gohlke (Linke); Rainer Groß (AfD); Ates Gürpinar (Linke); Ingo Hahn (AfD); Gabriela Heinrich (SPD); Heike Heubach (SPD); Anton Hofreiter (Grüne); Luke Hoß (Linke); Gerrit Huy (AfD); Bärbel Kofler (SPD); Rainer Kraft (AfD); Anette Kramme (SPD); Rebecca Lenhard (Grüne); Andreas Mayer (AfD); Reinhard Mixl (AfD); Sascha Müller (Grüne); Gerold Otten (AfD); Tobias Peterka (AfD); Stephan Protschka (AfD); Lukas Rehm (AfD); Sebastian Roloff (SPD); Claudia Roth (Grüne); Rainer Rothfuß (AfD); Bernd Rützel (SPD); Jamila Schäfer (Grüne); Johannes Schätzl (SPD); Raimond Scheirich (AfD); Carina Schießl (AfD); Manfred Schiller (AfD); Christoph Schmid (SPD); Stefan Schmidt (Grüne); Marlene Schönberger (Grüne); Evelyn Schötz (Linke); Michael Schrodi (SPD); Bernd Schuhmann (AfD); Andreas Schwarz (SPD); Tobias Teich (AfD); Carsten Träger (SPD); Bastian Treuheit (AfD); Aaron Valent (Linke); Sarah Vollath (Linke); Niklas Wagener (Grüne); Carolin Wagner (SPD); Johannes Wagner (Grüne); Carmen Wegge (SPD); Wolfgang Wiehle (AfD); and Tina Winklmann (Grüne).

===== 2021 =====
Results of the 2021 federal election held on 26 September 2021:

Party		Second votes per region							Total votes	%	Seats				
Party		Lower Bavaria	Lower Franc- onia	Middle Franc- onia	Swabia	Upper Bavaria	Upper Franc- onia	Upper Pala- tinate	Total votes	%	Con.	State			Tot.
Party		Lower Bavaria	Lower Franc- onia	Middle Franc- onia	Swabia	Upper Bavaria	Upper Franc- onia	Upper Pala- tinate	Total votes	%	Con.	Ini.	Lev.	Ele.	Tot.
Christian Social Union in Bavaria	CSU	243,181	275,297	300,931	338,145	794,504	223,271	227,498	2,402,827	31.74%	45	0	0	0	45 (Note: 11 overhang seats.)
Social Democratic Party of Germany	SPD	113,742	161,104	208,330	181,113	429,369	140,804	126,780	1,361,242	17.98%	0	20	3	23	23
Alliance 90/The Greens	Grüne	59,707	107,041	161,264	141,958	458,628	70,598	68,634	1,067,830	14.10%	1	14	4	18	19
Free Democratic Party	FDP	68,271	79,830	94,201	119,396	321,812	58,990	56,091	798,591	10.55%	0	11	3	14	14
Alternative for Germany	AfD	87,693	73,975	85,537	106,926	182,987	69,090	73,707	679,915	8.98%	0	10	2	12	12
Free Voters	FW	96,207	44,843	52,143	84,741	174,875	43,940	70,131	566,880	7.49%	0	0	0	0	0
Die Linke	Linke	14,535	24,528	36,137	28,443	73,004	17,074	17,117	210,838	2.78%	0	3	1	4	4
Grassroots Democratic Party of Germany	dieBasis	8,982	13,142	17,790	25,112	49,746	8,661	8,555	131,988	1.74%	0	0	0	0	0
Human Environment Animal Protection Party		6,991	9,729	11,960	12,123	25,901	7,642	6,565	80,911	1.07%	0	0	0	0	0
Die PARTEI		3,946	6,279	7,985	7,953	18,094	5,710	3,909	53,876	0.71%	0	0	0	0	0
Ecological Democratic Party	ÖDP	5,929	4,109	6,003	7,604	20,262	2,854	4,363	51,124	0.68%	0	0	0	0	0
Bavaria Party	BP	5,505	2,070	1,854	4,336	14,015	1,579	3,431	32,790	0.43%	0	0	0	0	0
Pirate Party Germany	Piraten	1,793	2,835	5,131	4,014	8,068	2,028	1,996	25,865	0.34%	0	0	0	0	0
Team Todenhöfer		1,227	2,285	4,109	3,680	10,958	1,429	941	24,629	0.33%	0	0	0	0	0
Volt Germany	Volt	807	1,913	2,627	2,444	11,247	1,380	1,016	21,434	0.28%	0	0	0	0	0
Independents for Citizen-Oriented Democracy		962	2,069	1,752	2,407	3,699	1,104	1,630	13,623	0.18%	0	0	0	0	0
Party for Health Research		649	1,137	1,270	1,255	2,578	911	724	8,524	0.11%	0	0	0	0	0
V-Partei3	V	602	896	1,092	1,923	2,721	521	576	8,331	0.11%	0	0	0	0	0
Party of Humanists	PdH	452	780	1,143	880	2,318	614	502	6,689	0.09%	0	0	0	0	0
National Democratic Party of Germany	NPD	589	719	1,023	993	1,139	724	556	5,743	0.08%	0	0	0	0	0
Alliance C – Christians for Germany		311	586	1,043	1,200	1,350	737	347	5,574	0.07%	0	0	0	0	0
Die Urbane. Eine HipHop Partei		262	590	560	577	1,569	329	313	4,200	0.06%	0	0	0	0	0
Third Way		376	501	507	527	828	488	317	3,544	0.05%	0	0	0	0	0
Liberal Conservative Reformers	LKR	95	355	191	294	573	124	174	1,806	0.02%	0	0	0	0	0
German Communist Party	DKP	80	142	275	179	435	73	104	1,288	0.02%	0	0	0	0	0
Marxist–Leninist Party of Germany	MLPD	57	191	208	217	372	149	57	1,251	0.02%	0	0	0	0	0
Valid votes		722,951	816,946	1,005,066	1,078,440	2,611,052	660,824	676,034	7,571,313	100.00%	46	58	13	71	117
Rejected votes		3,296	5,139	5,205	5,880	11,395	3,348	3,404	37,667	0.50%					
Total polled		726,247	822,085	1,010,271	1,084,320	2,622,447	664,172	679,438	7,608,980	79.95%					
Registered electors		938,007	1,012,738	1,276,081	1,373,986	3,230,976	833,382	852,494	9,517,664						
Turnout		77.42%	81.17%	79.17%	78.92%	81.17%	79.70%	79.70%	79.95%						

The following candidates were elected:

- State seats - Muhanad Al-Halak (FDP); Lisa Badum (Grüne); Ulrike Bahr (SPD); Karl Bär (Grüne); Nicole Bauer (FDP); Peter Boehringer (AfD); Sandra Bubendorfer-Licht (FDP); Petr Bystron (AfD); Ekin Deligöz (Grüne); Sabine Dittmar (SPD); Leon Eckert (Grüne); Klaus Ernst (Linke); Peter Felser (AfD); Susanne Ferschl (Linke); Daniel Föst (FDP); Maximilian Funke-Kaiser (FDP); Tessa Ganserer (Grüne); Nicole Gohlke (Linke); Uli Grötsch (SPD); Erhard Grundl (Grüne); Ates Gürpinar (Linke); Thomas Hacker (FDP); Rita Hagl-Kehl (SPD); Gabriela Heinrich (SPD); Katja Hessel (FDP); Anton Hofreiter (Grüne); Johannes Huber (AfD); Markus Hümpfer (SPD); Gerrit Huy (AfD); Dieter Janecek (Grüne); Karsten Klein (FDP); Bärbel Kofler (SPD); Lukas Köhler (FDP); Rainer Kraft (AfD); Anette Kramme (SPD); Ulrich Lechte (FDP); Kristine Lütke (FDP); Andreas Mehltretter (SPD); Corinna Miazga (AfD); Sascha Müller (Grüne); Jörg Nürnberger (SPD); Gerold Otten (AfD); Tobias Peterka (AfD); Jan Plobner (SPD); Stephan Protschka (AfD); Sebastian Roloff (SPD); Claudia Roth (Grüne); Manuela Rottmann (Grüne); Bernd Rützel (SPD); Thomas Sattelberger (FDP); Johannes Schätzl (SPD); Marianne Schieder (SPD); Christoph Schmid (SPD); Stefan Schmidt (Grüne); Marlene Schönberger (Grüne); Michael Schrodi (SPD); Andreas Schwarz (SPD); Martin Sichert (AfD); Martina Stamm-Fibich (SPD); Claudia Tausend (SPD); Stephan Thomae (FDP); Carsten Träger (SPD); Andrew Ullmann (FDP); Niklas Wagener (Grüne); Carolin Wagner (SPD); Johannes Wagner (Grüne); Beate Walter-Rosenheimer (Grüne); Carmen Wegge (SPD); Saskia Weishaupt (Grüne); Wolfgang Wiehle (AfD); and Tina Winklmann (Grüne).

Substitutions:

- Thomas Sattelberger (FDP) resigned on 1 August 2022 and was replaced by Nils Gründer (FDP) on 2 August 2022.
- Corinna Miazga (AfD) died on 25 February 2023 and was replaced by Rainer Rothfuß (AfD) on 2 March 2023.
- Uli Grötsch (SPD) resigned on 15 March 2024 and was replaced by Heike Heubach (SPD) on 20 March 2024.
- Petr Bystron (AfD) resigned on 15 July 2024 and was replaced by Manfred Schiller (AfD) on 23 July 2024.
- Manuela Rottmann (Grüne) resigned on 1 December 2024 and was replaced by Uwe Kekeritz (Grüne) on 2 December 2024.

==== 2010s ====
===== 2017 =====
Results of the 2017 federal election held on 24 September 2017:

Party		Second votes per region							Total votes	%	Seats				
Party		Lower Bavaria	Lower Franc- onia	Middle Franc- onia	Swabia	Upper Bavaria	Upper Franc- onia	Upper Pala- tinate	Total votes	%	Con.	State			Tot.
Party		Lower Bavaria	Lower Franc- onia	Middle Franc- onia	Swabia	Upper Bavaria	Upper Franc- onia	Upper Pala- tinate	Total votes	%	Con.	Ini.	Lev.	Ele.	Tot.
Christian Social Union in Bavaria	CSU	283,104	327,301	347,042	418,780	960,008	264,495	268,958	2,869,688	38.82%	46	0	0	0	46 (Note: Seven overhang seats.)
Social Democratic Party of Germany	SPD	94,996	139,294	182,094	139,238	345,164	124,730	105,415	1,130,931	15.30%	0	15	3	18	18
Alternative for Germany	AfD	115,770	87,817	113,219	140,885	285,249	80,768	92,592	916,300	12.39%	0	13	1	14	14
Free Democratic Party	FDP	61,770	77,016	88,944	106,614	311,907	55,337	49,660	751,248	10.16%	0	10	2	12	12
Alliance 90/The Greens	Grüne	40,101	72,166	108,749	97,235	310,425	47,383	46,057	722,116	9.77%	0	10	1	11	11
Die Linke	Linke	33,619	50,699	79,002	59,864	154,985	36,884	35,750	450,803	6.10%	0	6	1	7	7
Free Voters	FW	28,662	17,326	24,752	29,384	54,082	16,176	28,816	199,198	2.69%	0	0	0	0	0
Ecological Democratic Party	ÖDP	8,306	5,258	8,003	10,294	25,467	3,429	6,044	66,801	0.90%	0	0	0	0	0
Human Environment Animal Protection Party		5,708	7,502	10,000	9,579	22,001	5,942	5,486	66,218	0.90%	0	0	0	0	0
Bavaria Party	BP	9,644	2,219	2,496	7,551	28,354	2,062	5,711	58,037	0.79%	0	0	0	0	0
Die PARTEI		2,838	6,419	8,799	6,314	18,185	5,592	3,460	51,607	0.70%	0	0	0	0	0
Pirate Party Germany	Piraten	1,729	2,751	4,675	4,221	9,283	2,159	2,048	26,866	0.36%	0	0	0	0	0
National Democratic Party of Germany	NPD	2,333	2,806	3,206	3,249	3,970	2,819	2,228	20,611	0.28%	0	0	0	0	0
V-Partei3	V	960	1,792	1,719	2,319	4,567	1,082	952	13,391	0.18%	0	0	0	0	0
German Centre	DM	817	1,833	1,720	2,121	4,371	1,012	815	12,689	0.17%	0	0	0	0	0
Democracy in Motion	DiB	681	1,075	1,809	1,411	5,543	846	708	12,073	0.16%	0	0	0	0	0
Basic Income Alliance	BGE	661	1,058	1,489	1,853	3,914	783	636	10,394	0.14%	0	0	0	0	0
Party for Health Research		793	1,229	1,475	1,401	2,894	890	847	9,529	0.13%	0	0	0	0	0
Marxist–Leninist Party of Germany	MLPD	93	380	380	331	607	290	132	2,213	0.03%	0	0	0	0	0
Bürgerrechtsbewegung Solidarität	BüSo	79	103	116	211	619	78	78	1,284	0.02%	0	0	0	0	0
German Communist Party	DKP	75	104	280	159	423	76	96	1,213	0.02%	0	0	0	0	0
Valid votes		692,739	806,148	989,969	1,043,014	2,552,018	652,833	656,489	7,393,210	100.00%	46	54	8	62	108
Rejected votes		4,755	6,318	6,961	7,179	12,921	4,801	4,861	47,796	0.64%					
Total polled		697,494	812,466	996,930	1,050,193	2,564,939	657,634	661,350	7,441,006	78.14%					
Registered electors		936,477	1,020,614	1,281,564	1,363,912	3,221,629	844,550	853,625	9,522,371						
Turnout		74.48%	79.61%	77.79%	77.00%	79.62%	77.87%	77.48%	78.14%						

The following candidates were elected:

- State seats - Lisa Badum (Grüne); Ulrike Bahr (SPD); Simone Barrientos Krauss (Linke); Nicole Bauer (FDP); Margarete Bause (Grüne); Peter Boehringer (AfD); Karl-Heinz Brunner (SPD); Martin Burkert (SPD); Petr Bystron (AfD); Britta Dassler (FDP); Ekin Deligöz (Grüne); Sabine Dittmar (SPD); Klaus Ernst (Linke); Peter Felser (AfD); Susanne Ferschl (Linke); Daniel Föst (FDP); Nicole Gohlke (Linke); Uli Grötsch (SPD); Erhard Grundl (Grüne); Thomas Hacker (FDP); Rita Hagl-Kehl (SPD); Martin Hebner (AfD); Gabriela Heinrich (SPD); Katja Hessel (FDP); Anton Hofreiter (Grüne); Johannes Huber (AfD); Dieter Janecek (Grüne); Uwe Kekeritz (Grüne); Karsten Klein (FDP); Bärbel Kofler (SPD); Lukas Köhler (FDP); Rainer Kraft (AfD); Anette Kramme (SPD); Ulrich Lechte (FDP); Corinna Miazga (AfD); Hansjörg Müller (AfD); Gerold Otten (AfD); Tobias Peterka (AfD); Paul Podolay (AfD); Florian Post (SPD); Florian Pronold (SPD); Stephan Protschka (AfD); Claudia Roth (Grüne); Manuela Rottmann (Grüne); Bernd Rützel (SPD); Thomas Sattelberger (FDP); Marianne Schieder (SPD); Stefan Schmidt (Grüne); Eva Schreiber (Linke); Michael Schrodi (SPD); Jimmy Schulz (FDP); Ewald Schurer (SPD); Andreas Schwarz (SPD); Martin Sichert (AfD); Martina Stamm-Fibich (SPD); Claudia Tausend (SPD); Stephan Thomae (FDP); Andrew Ullmann (FDP); Andreas Wagner (Linke); Beate Walter-Rosenheimer (Grüne); Wolfgang Wiehle (AfD); and Harald Weinberg (Linke).

Substitutions:

- Ewald Schurer (SPD) died on 3 December 2017 and was replaced by Carsten Träger (SPD) on 6 December 2017.
- Jimmy Schulz (FDP) died on 25 November 2019 and was replaced by Sandra Bubendorfer-Licht (FDP) on 9 December 2019.
- Martin Burkert (SPD) resigned on 1 February 2020 and was replaced by Bela Bach (SPD) on 4 February 2020.
- Astrid Freudenstein (CSU) resigned on 15 May 2020 and was replaced by Tobias Zech (CSU) on 25 May 2020.
- Tobias Zech (CSU) resigned on 19 March 2021 and was replaced by Bernd Fabritius (CSU) on 22 March 2021.
- Martin Hebner (AfD) died on 7 July 2021 and was replaced by Florian Jäger (AfD) on 20 July 2021.

Additional state seats following vacation of constituency seats:

- Marlene Mortler (CSU, Roth) resigned on 1 July 2019 and was replaced by Astrid Freudenstein (CSU) on 2 July 2019.

===== 2013 =====
Results of the 2013 federal election held on 22 September 2013:

Party		Second votes per region							Total votes	%	Seats				
Party		Lower Bavaria	Lower Franc- onia	Middle Franc- onia	Swabia	Upper Bavaria	Upper Franc- onia	Upper Pala- tinate	Total votes	%	Con.	State			Tot.
Party		Lower Bavaria	Lower Franc- onia	Middle Franc- onia	Swabia	Upper Bavaria	Upper Franc- onia	Upper Pala- tinate	Total votes	%	Con.	Ini.	Lev.	Ele.	Tot.
Christian Social Union in Bavaria	CSU	331,703	359,905	380,985	480,901	1,100,311	288,556	301,208	3,243,569	49.29%	45	11	0	11	56
Social Democratic Party of Germany	SPD	97,625	152,922	224,593	159,840	423,797	139,744	115,488	1,314,009	19.97%	0	23	-1	22	22
Alliance 90/The Greens	Grüne	31,707	60,195	86,688	70,914	229,469	38,090	35,755	552,818	8.40%	0	9	0	9	9
Free Democratic Party	FDP	25,592	35,149	43,014	44,056	139,213	25,012	22,122	334,158	5.08%	0	0	0	0	0
Alternative for Germany	AfD	22,514	26,887	37,540	45,281	105,972	24,285	21,091	283,570	4.31%	0	0	0	0	0
Die Linke	Linke	18,717	30,053	43,677	34,084	78,881	23,352	20,156	248,920	3.78%	0	4	0	4	4
Free Voters	FW	24,183	19,611	23,515	21,309	52,755	15,592	23,684	180,649	2.75%	0	0	0	0	0
Pirate Party Germany	Piraten	8,794	14,702	21,144	16,776	44,878	11,455	10,185	127,934	1.94%	0	0	0	0	0
Ecological Democratic Party	ÖDP	8,682	5,072	7,162	10,544	26,506	3,244	7,155	68,365	1.04%	0	0	0	0	0
Bavaria Party	BP	7,879	3,167	3,354	8,299	26,182	2,628	5,886	57,395	0.87%	0	0	0	0	0
National Democratic Party of Germany	NPD	6,731	7,251	8,768	8,302	11,383	7,822	6,480	56,737	0.86%	0	0	0	0	0
Human Environment Animal Protection Party		4,263	5,124	6,510	6,764	15,885	4,357	4,034	46,937	0.71%	0	0	0	0	0
The Republicans	REP	2,088	5,021	3,512	4,882	8,015	2,334	1,605	27,457	0.42%	0	0	0	0	0
Feminist Party of Germany		1,046	1,458	1,629	2,137	3,463	1,349	1,066	12,148	0.18%	0	0	0	0	0
The Violets		677	805	1,009	1,254	3,334	569	563	8,211	0.12%	0	0	0	0	0
Party of Reason	PdV	619	908	956	941	2,189	617	610	6,840	0.10%	0	0	0	0	0
Pro Germany Citizens' Movement		441	586	680	700	1,615	426	426	4,874	0.07%	0	0	0	0	0
Alliance 21/Pensioners' Party		158	375	487	863	812	180	157	3,032	0.05%	0	0	0	0	0
Marxist–Leninist Party of Germany	MLPD	79	221	361	263	542	170	121	1,757	0.03%	0	0	0	0	0
Bürgerrechtsbewegung Solidarität	BüSo	105	116	144	181	658	78	93	1,375	0.02%	0	0	0	0	0
Valid votes		593,603	729,528	895,728	918,291	2,275,860	589,860	577,885	6,580,755	100.00%	45	47	-1	46	91
Rejected votes		4,784	8,142	7,477	7,298	14,722	5,191	5,357	52,971	0.80%					
Total polled		598,387	737,670	903,205	925,589	2,290,582	595,051	583,242	6,633,726	70.03%					
Registered electors		929,828	1,026,674	1,281,684	1,348,878	3,183,044	851,872	850,758	9,472,738						
Turnout		64.35%	71.85%	70.47%	68.62%	71.96%	69.85%	68.56%	70.03%						

The following candidates were elected:

- State seats - Katrin Albsteiger (CSU); Artur Auernhammer (CSU); Ulrike Bahr (SPD); Klaus Barthel (SPD); Julia Bartz (CSU); Karl-Heinz Brunner (SPD); Eva Bulling-Schröter (Linke); Martin Burkert (SPD); Ekin Deligöz (Grüne); Sabine Dittmar (SPD); Klaus Ernst (Linke); Petra Ernstberger (SPD); Bernd Fabritius (CSU); Christian Flisek (SPD); Gabriele Fograscher (SPD); Astrid Freudenstein (CSU); Thomas Gambke (Grüne); Nicole Gohlke (Linke); Uli Grötsch (SPD); Rita Hagl-Kehl (SPD); Gabriela Heinrich (SPD); Anton Hofreiter (Grüne); Dieter Janecek (Grüne); Uwe Kekeritz (Grüne); Bärbel Kofler (SPD); Anette Kramme (SPD); Barbara Lanzinger (CSU); Silke Launert (CSU); Reiner Meier (CSU); Florian Post (SPD); Florian Pronold (SPD); Claudia Roth (Grüne); Bernd Rützel (SPD); Elisabeth Scharfenberg (Grüne); Marianne Schieder (SPD); Ewald Schurer (SPD); Andreas Schwarz (SPD); Martina Stamm-Fibich (SPD); Matthäus Strebl (CSU); Claudia Tausend (SPD); Carsten Träger (SPD); Doris Wagner (Grüne); Beate Walter-Rosenheimer (Grüne); Harald Weinberg (Linke); Tobias Zech (CSU); and Gudrun Zollner (CSU).

Additional state seats following vacation of constituency seats:

- Peter Gauweiler (CSU, Munich South) resigned on 1 April 2015 and was replaced by Iris Eberl (CSU) on 10 April 2015.

==== 2000s ====
===== 2009 =====
Results of the 2009 federal election held on 27 September 2009:

Party		Second votes per region							Total votes	%	Seats		
Party		Lower Bavaria	Lower Franc- onia	Middle Franc- onia	Swabia	Upper Bavaria	Upper Franc- onia	Upper Pala- tinate	Total votes	%	Con.	Stat.	Tot.
Christian Social Union in Bavaria	CSU	286,116	319,981	327,574	417,240	945,315	272,346	261,666	2,830,238	42.55%	45	0	45 (Note: Three overhang seats.)
Social Democratic Party of Germany	SPD	84,986	129,006	195,759	133,500	352,923	119,568	104,276	1,120,018	16.84%	0	16	16
Free Democratic Party	FDP	85,309	105,361	124,545	145,252	367,128	75,543	73,241	976,379	14.68%	0	14	14
Alliance 90/The Greens	Grüne	42,956	79,354	108,312	91,198	299,090	50,565	47,790	719,265	10.81%	0	10	10
Die Linke	Linke	39,287	55,790	71,178	56,027	122,719	41,885	42,485	429,371	6.45%	0	6	6
Pirate Party Germany	Piraten	8,539	15,861	24,493	18,817	44,237	12,115	11,728	135,790	2.04%	0	0	0
National Democratic Party of Germany	NPD	10,486	8,945	13,969	12,652	19,436	10,876	11,227	87,591	1.32%	0	0	0
Ecological Democratic Party	ÖDP	11,508	5,720	8,114	11,644	26,534	3,621	8,725	75,866	1.14%	0	0	0
The Republicans	REP	6,260	9,449	5,985	8,224	14,577	6,202	3,891	54,588	0.82%	0	0	0
Alliance 21/Pensioners' Party		2,786	4,470	8,160	6,978	19,345	2,857	3,862	48,458	0.73%	0	0	0
Bavaria Party	BP	5,894	2,415	2,348	9,076	21,654	2,478	4,446	48,311	0.73%	0	0	0
Family Party of Germany		4,073	5,734	6,662	6,608	12,032	4,634	4,678	44,421	0.67%	0	0	0
Human Environment Animal Protection Party		3,660	4,662	6,447	5,973	14,445	3,909	4,119	43,215	0.65%	0	0	0
The Violets		1,488	1,319	1,910	2,225	4,978	942	1,010	13,872	0.21%	0	0	0
Party of Bible-abiding Christians	PBC	468	1,117	1,955	1,484	2,102	1,482	654	9,262	0.14%	0	0	0
Christian Centre	CM	633	733	693	1,492	1,938	562	775	6,826	0.10%	0	0	0
German People's Union	DVU	299	285	567	582	1,086	313	359	3,491	0.05%	0	0	0
Bürgerrechtsbewegung Solidarität	BüSo	258	252	283	486	1,629	185	212	3,305	0.05%	0	0	0
Marxist–Leninist Party of Germany	MLPD	96	244	344	300	496	169	120	1,769	0.03%	0	0	0
Valid votes		595,102	750,698	909,298	929,758	2,271,664	610,252	585,264	6,652,036	100.00%	45	46	91
Rejected votes		6,329	9,922	9,493	10,601	18,254	6,535	7,362	68,496	1.02%			
Total polled		601,431	760,620	918,791	940,359	2,289,918	616,787	592,626	6,720,532	71.63%			
Registered electors		922,845	1,028,483	1,270,273	1,335,789	3,120,856	858,583	845,754	9,382,583				
Turnout		65.17%	73.96%	72.33%	70.40%	73.37%	71.84%	70.07%	71.63%				

The following candidates were elected:

- State seats - Klaus Barthel (SPD); Klaus Breil (FDP); Eva Bulling-Schröter (Linke); Martin Burkert (SPD); Ekin Deligöz (Grüne); Rainer Erdel (FDP); Klaus Ernst (Linke); Petra Ernstberger (SPD); Hans-Josef Fell (Grüne); Gabriele Fograscher (SPD); Thomas Gambke (Grüne); Günter Gloser (SPD); Nicole Gohlke (Linke); Angelika Graf (SPD); Miriam Gruß (FDP); Frank Hofmann (SPD); Anton Hofreiter (Grüne); Susanne Kastner (SPD); Uwe Kekeritz (Grüne); Bärbel Kofler (SPD); Sebastian Körber (FDP); Anette Kramme (SPD); Agnes Krumwiede (Grüne); Sabine Leutheusser-Schnarrenberger (FDP); Erwin Lotter (FDP); Horst Meierhofer (FDP); Kornelia Möller (Linke); Jerzy Montag (Grüne); Heinz Paula (SPD); Florian Pronold (SPD); Claudia Roth (Grüne); Marlene Rupprecht (SPD); Elisabeth Scharfenberg (Grüne); Christine Scheel (Grüne); Marianne Schieder (SPD); Werner Schieder (SPD); Jimmy Schulz (FDP); Ewald Schurer (SPD); Marina Schuster (FDP); Joachim Spatz (FDP); Max Stadler (FDP); Rainer Stinner (FDP); Alexander Süßmair (Linke); Stephan Thomae (FDP); Daniel Volk (FDP); and Harald Weinberg (Linke).

Substitutions:

- Christine Scheel (Grüne) resigned on 16 January 2012 and was replaced by Beate Walter-Rosenheimer (Grüne) on the same day.
- Max Stadler (FDP) died on 12 May 2013 and was replaced by Gerhard Drexler (FDP) on 15 May 2013.

===== 2005 =====
Results of the 2005 federal election held on 18 September 2005:

Party		Second votes per region							Total votes	%	Seats		
Party		Lower Bavaria	Lower Franc- onia	Middle Franc- onia	Swabia	Upper Bavaria	Upper Franc- onia	Upper Pala- tinate	Total votes	%	Con.	Stat.	Tot.
Christian Social Union in Bavaria	CSU	382,145	385,774	409,853	532,436	1,141,973	318,234	323,894	3,494,309	49.25%	44	2	46
Social Democratic Party of Germany	SPD	141,206	206,386	310,616	226,221	559,616	191,943	170,560	1,806,548	25.46%	1	23	24
Free Democratic Party	FDP	55,603	74,326	80,950	99,617	259,658	55,997	47,666	673,817	9.50%	0	9	9
Alliance 90/The Greens	Grüne	30,629	60,988	83,934	74,298	236,932	38,042	35,118	559,941	7.89%	0	7	7
The Left Party.PDS	Linke	21,457	33,279	39,100	31,444	71,741	24,770	22,910	244,701	3.45%	0	3	3
National Democratic Party of Germany	NPD	12,323	9,497	14,820	13,278	20,244	12,801	12,233	95,196	1.34%	0	0	0
The Republicans	REP	8,094	15,059	7,684	11,187	18,338	8,390	4,867	73,619	1.04%	0	0	0
Family Party of Germany		4,701	5,282	5,430	6,928	13,572	4,161	5,322	45,396	0.64%	0	0	0
Bavaria Party	BP	5,030	1,736	2,494	4,908	14,306	1,952	5,117	35,543	0.50%	0	0	0
The Grays – Gray Panthers	Graue	1,755	2,381	3,295	3,266	8,272	1,876	1,535	22,380	0.32%	0	0	0
Party of Bible-abiding Christians	PBC	868	2,260	4,605	2,849	3,458	2,376	1,066	17,482	0.25%	0	0	0
Feminist Party of Germany		1,738	2,355	2,377	2,751	4,748	1,779	1,677	17,425	0.25%	0	0	0
Bürgerrechtsbewegung Solidarität	BüSo	596	481	598	859	2,120	375	472	5,501	0.08%	0	0	0
Marxist–Leninist Party of Germany	MLPD	235	530	652	546	880	367	238	3,448	0.05%	0	0	0
Valid votes		666,380	800,334	966,408	1,010,588	2,355,858	663,063	632,675	7,095,306	100.00%	45	44	89
Rejected votes		8,192	12,500	12,447	12,808	22,448	8,634	9,507	86,536	1.20%			
Total polled		674,572	812,834	978,855	1,023,396	2,378,306	671,697	642,182	7,181,842	77.87%			
Registered electors		915,153	1,020,845	1,251,994	1,316,937	3,015,997	863,775	837,859	9,222,560				
Turnout		73.71%	79.62%	78.18%	77.71%	78.86%	77.76%	76.65%	77.87%				

The following candidates were elected:

- State seats - Klaus Barthel (SPD); Günther Beckstein (CSU); Eva Bulling-Schröter (Linke); Martin Burkert (SPD); Ekin Deligöz (Grüne); Carl-Christian Dressel (SPD); Klaus Ernst (Linke); Petra Ernstberger (SPD); Hans-Josef Fell (Grüne); Gabriele Fograscher (SPD); Horst Friedrich (FDP); Günter Gloser (SPD); Angelika Graf (SPD); Frank Hofmann (SPD); Anton Hofreiter (Grüne); Brunhilde Irber (SPD); Susanne Kastner (SPD); Bärbel Kofler (SPD); Walter Kolbow (SPD); Anette Kramme (SPD); Miriam Krebs (FDP); Sabine Leutheusser-Schnarrenberger (FDP); Horst Meierhofer (FDP); Kornelia Möller (Linke); Jerzy Montag (Grüne); Heinz Paula (SPD); Florian Pronold (SPD); Jörg Rohde (FDP); Claudia Roth (Grüne); Marlene Rupprecht (SPD); Elisabeth Scharfenberg (Grüne); Christine Scheel (Grüne); Marianne Schieder (SPD); Otto Schily (SPD); Renate Schmidt (SPD); Ewald Schurer (SPD); Marina Schuster (FDP); Max Stadler (FDP); Ludwig Stiegler (SPD); Rainer Stinner (FDP); Edmund Stoiber (CSU); Jella Teuchner (SPD); Heidemarie Wright (SPD); and Martin Zeil (FDP).

Substitutions:

- Edmund Stoiber (CSU) resigned on 8 November 2005 and was replaced by Johannes Singhammer (CSU) on 11 November 2005.
- Günther Beckstein (CSU) resigned on 22 November 2005 and was replaced by Dorothee Bär (CSU) on 23 November 2005.
- Jörg Rohde (FDP) resigned on 1 November 2008 and was replaced by Daniel Volk (FDP) on the same day.
- Martin Zeil (FDP) resigned on 1 November 2008 and was replaced by Erwin Lotter (FDP) on the same day.

Additional state seats following vacation of constituency seats:

- Georg Fahrenschon (CSU, Munich Land) resigned on 8 November 2007 and was replaced by Marion Seib (CSU) on the same day.
- Horst Seehofer (CSU, Ingolstadt) resigned on 5 November 2008 and was replaced by Matthäus Strebl (CSU) on 10 November 2008.

===== 2002 =====
Results of the 2002 federal election held on 22 September 2002:

Party		Second votes per region							Total votes	%	Seats		
Party		Lower Bavaria	Lower Franc- onia	Middle Franc- onia	Swabia	Upper Bavaria	Upper Franc- onia	Upper Pala- tinate	Total votes	%	Con.	Stat.	Tot.
Christian Social Union in Bavaria	CSU	494,108	465,426	499,835	636,371	1,399,370	397,620	422,350	4,315,080	58.61%	43	15	58
Social Democratic Party of Germany	SPD	140,612	231,628	335,527	250,531	579,584	210,282	174,387	1,922,551	26.11%	1	25	26
Alliance 90/The Greens	Grüne	28,956	59,326	82,154	69,240	251,219	37,383	34,205	562,483	7.64%	0	7	7
Free Democratic Party	FDP	23,453	41,296	45,876	47,106	125,297	28,436	21,211	332,675	4.52%	0	4	4
Party of Democratic Socialism	PDS	2,960	5,189	8,071	6,022	19,341	4,524	3,408	49,515	0.67%	0	0	0
The Republicans	REP	4,463	9,611	6,555	8,011	12,910	5,497	3,071	50,118	0.68%	0	0	0
Ecological Democratic Party	ÖDP	4,072	3,020	2,810	3,772	9,245	1,169	2,808	26,896	0.37%	0	0	0
Human Environment Animal Protection Party		1,968	2,750	3,338	3,505	8,572	2,378	1,975	24,486	0.33%	0	0	0
National Democratic Party of Germany	NPD	1,943	2,070	3,077	2,163	3,734	2,190	1,619	16,796	0.23%	0	0	0
Party for a Rule of Law Offensive	Schill	1,628	1,978	2,631	2,485	5,066	1,668	1,353	16,809	0.23%	0	0	0
Bavaria Party	BP	1,053	511	572	1,505	4,128	547	1,063	9,379	0.13%	0	0	0
Feminist Party of Germany		687	1,136	1,102	1,228	2,270	810	648	7,881	0.11%	0	0	0
Party of Bible-abiding Christians	PBC	445	1,190	2,805	1,467	1,966	1,677	571	10,121	0.14%	0	0	0
The Grays – Gray Panthers	Graue	495	820	971	1,085	2,789	662	446	7,268	0.10%	0	0	0
Christian Centre	CM	338	631	368	959	1,283	259	333	4,171	0.06%	0	0	0
Departure for Civil Rights, Freedom and Health		315	491	520	845	1,892	388	246	4,697	0.06%	0	0	0
Bürgerrechtsbewegung Solidarität	BüSo	83	98	125	364	835	85	98	1,688	0.02%	0	0	0
Valid votes		707,579	827,171	996,337	1,036,659	2,429,501	695,575	669,792	7,362,614	100.00%	44	51	95
Rejected votes		5,047	7,296	7,498	7,577	14,597	5,534	6,070	53,619	0.72%			
Total polled		712,626	834,467	1,003,835	1,044,236	2,444,098	701,109	675,862	7,416,233	81.48%			
Registered electors		901,985	1,011,246	1,238,167	1,292,705	2,965,339	862,952	829,099	9,101,493				
Turnout		79.01%	82.52%	81.07%	80.78%	82.42%	81.25%	81.52%	81.48%				

The following candidates were elected:

- State seats - Klaus Barthel (SPD); Günther Beckstein (CSU); Hans Büttner (SPD); Ekin Deligöz (Grüne); Albert Deß (CSU); Petra Ernstberger (SPD); Georg Fahrenschon (CSU); Hans-Josef Fell (Grüne); Gabriele Fograscher (SPD); Horst Friedrich (FDP); Günter Gloser (SPD); Angelika Graf (SPD); Frank Hofmann (SPD); Brunhilde Irber (SPD); Susanne Kastner (SPD); Gerlinde Kaupa (CSU); Heinz Köhler (SPD); Walter Kolbow (SPD); Anette Kramme (SPD); Horst Kubatschka (SPD); Sabine Leutheusser-Schnarrenberger (FDP); Dorothee Mantel (CSU); Doris Meyer (CSU); Jerzy Montag (Grüne); Heinz Paula (SPD); Florian Pronold (SPD); Daniela Raab (CSU); Hannelore Roedel (CSU); Claudia Roth (Grüne); Albert Rupprecht (CSU); Marlene Rupprecht (SPD); Christine Scheel (Grüne); Andreas Scheuer (CSU); Otto Schily (SPD); Horst Schmidbauer (SPD); Albert Schmidt (Grüne); Fritz Schösser (SPD); Matthias Sehling (CSU); Marion Seib (CSU); Erika Simm (SPD); Johannes Singhammer (CSU); Sigrid Skarpelis-Sperk (SPD); Ursula Sowa (Grüne); Max Stadler (FDP); Ludwig Stiegler (SPD); Rainer Stinner (FDP); Edmund Stoiber (CSU); Matthäus Strebl (CSU); Jella Teuchner (SPD); Verena Wohlleben (SPD); and Heidemarie Wright (SPD).

Substitutions:

- Albert Deß (CSU) resigned on 19 July 2004 and was replaced by Artur Auernhammer (CSU) on 29 July 2004.
- Hans Büttner (SPD) died on 18 September 2004 and was replaced by Bärbel Kofler (SPD) on 21 September 2004.

==== 1990s ====
===== 1998 =====
Results of the 1998 federal election held on 27 September 1998:

Party		Second votes per region							Total votes	%	Seats		
Party		Lower Bavaria	Lower Franc- onia	Middle Franc- onia	Swabia	Upper Bavaria	Upper Franc- onia	Upper Pala- tinate	Total votes	%	Con.	Stat.	Tot.
Christian Social Union in Bavaria	CSU	341,497	384,704	406,991	491,141	1,077,719	308,775	313,653	3,324,480	47.67%	38	9	47
Social Democratic Party of Germany	SPD	208,085	277,838	397,669	303,345	702,741	273,484	237,859	2,401,021	34.43%	7	27	34
Alliance 90/The Greens	Grüne	23,968	47,829	61,271	55,161	171,462	29,652	24,566	413,909	5.93%	0	6	6
Free Democratic Party	FDP	25,816	39,018	47,670	52,244	140,871	27,451	21,550	354,620	5.08%	0	5	5
The Republicans	REP	19,192	27,803	19,531	34,011	50,016	16,315	12,170	179,038	2.57%	0	0	0
Ecological Democratic Party	ÖDP	7,259	5,102	5,169	8,197	15,870	3,016	4,571	49,184	0.71%	0	0	0
Party of Democratic Socialism	PDS	2,517	4,676	8,040	5,777	17,691	4,190	3,410	46,301	0.66%	0	1	1
German People's Union	DVU	3,968	3,239	8,267	6,190	13,721	4,199	3,938	43,522	0.62%	0	0	0
Initiative Pro D-Mark	Pro DM	3,446	3,636	4,673	5,816	7,123	5,113	2,881	32,688	0.47%	0	0	0
Bavaria Party	BP	3,889	1,496	1,488	4,430	12,591	1,817	2,396	28,107	0.40%	0	0	0
Federation of Free Citizens	BfB	1,001	1,007	1,430	2,930	16,715	1,273	676	25,032	0.36%	0	0	0
Human Environment Animal Protection Party		1,892	2,344	2,929	3,186	7,227	2,112	1,686	21,376	0.31%	0	0	0
The Grays – Gray Panthers	Graue	785	1,180	1,264	1,733	4,952	687	648	11,249	0.16%	0	0	0
Party of Bible-abiding Christians	PBC	468	1,076	2,735	1,433	1,554	1,559	750	9,575	0.14%	0	0	0
National Democratic Party of Germany	NPD	771	917	1,379	938	1,664	991	559	7,219	0.10%	0	0	0
Anarchist Pogo Party of Germany	APPD	429	698	727	848	2,233	593	477	6,005	0.09%	0	0	0
Natural Law Party		387	493	529	911	2,165	320	792	5,597	0.08%	0	0	0
Feminist Party of Germany		508	684	731	831	1,557	533	473	5,317	0.08%	0	0	0
Christian Centre	CM	517	803	447	1,082	1,384	386	406	5,025	0.07%	0	0	0
Chance 2000		192	417	467	509	1,074	361	179	3,199	0.05%	0	0	0
Bürgerrechtsbewegung Solidarität	BüSo	80	88	111	195	677	61	146	1,358	0.02%	0	0	0
Marxist–Leninist Party of Germany	MLPD	40	93	151	91	157	70	44	646	0.01%	0	0	0
Valid votes		646,707	805,141	973,669	980,999	2,251,164	682,958	633,830	6,974,468	100.00%	45	48	93
Rejected votes		5,713	7,125	7,216	7,289	13,486	5,317	6,197	52,343	0.74%			
Total polled		652,420	812,266	980,885	988,288	2,264,650	688,275	640,027	7,026,811	79.17%			
Registered electors		875,423	991,774	1,220,154	1,258,632	2,860,993	856,774	811,578	8,875,328				
Turnout		74.53%	81.90%	80.39%	78.52%	79.16%	80.33%	78.86%	79.17%				

The following candidates were elected:

- State seats - Klaus Barthel (SPD); Renate Blank (CSU); Hildebrecht Braun (FDP); Eva Bulling-Schröter (PDS); Hans Büttner (SPD); Ekin Deligöz (Grüne); Albert Deß (CSU); Maria Eichhorn (CSU); Hans-Josef Fell (Grüne); Gabriele Fograscher (SPD); Hans-Peter Friedrich (CSU); Horst Friedrich (FDP); Angelika Graf (SPD); Frank Hofmann (SPD); Klaus Holetschek (CSU); Brunhilde Irber (SPD); Ulrich Irmer (FDP); Susanne Kastner (SPD); Walter Kolbow (SPD); Anette Kramme (SPD); Horst Kubatschka (SPD); Robert Leidinger (SPD); Sabine Leutheusser-Schnarrenberger (FDP); Heide Mattischeck (SPD); Hans Michelbach (CSU); Martin Pfaff (SPD); Georg Pfannenstein (SPD); Claudia Roth (Grüne); Marlene Rupprecht (SPD); Christine Scheel (Grüne); Otto Schily (SPD); Albert Schmidt (Grüne); Fritz Schösser (SPD); Ewald Schurer (SPD); Erika Simm (SPD); Johannes Singhammer (CSU); Sigrid Skarpelis-Sperk (SPD); Max Stadler (FDP); Ludwig Stiegler (SPD); Jella Teuchner (SPD); Uta Titze-Stecher (SPD); Günter Verheugen (SPD); Helmut Wilhelm (Grüne); Verena Wohlleben (SPD); Dagmar Wöhrl (CSU); Aribert Wolf (CSU); Hanna Wolf (SPD); and Heidemarie Wright (SPD).

Substitutions:

- Günter Verheugen (SPD) resigned on 15 September 1999 and was replaced by Reinhold Strobl (SPD) on 17 September 1999.
- Claudia Roth (Grüne) resigned on 31 March 2001 and was replaced by Gerald Häfner (Grüne) on 1 April 2001.
- Klaus Holetschek (CSU) resigned on 6 May 2002 and was replaced by Marion Seib (CSU) on 7 May 2002.

Additional state seats following vacation of constituency seats:

- Michaela Geiger (CSU, Weilheim) died on 30 December 1998 and was replaced by Matthäus Strebl (CSU) on 12 January 1999.

===== 1994 =====
Results of the 1994 federal election held on 16 October 1994:

Party		Second votes per region							Total votes	%	Seats		
Party		Lower Bavaria	Lower Franc- onia	Middle Franc- onia	Swabia	Upper Bavaria	Upper Franc- onia	Upper Pala- tinate	Total votes	%	Con.	Stat.	Tot.
Christian Social Union in Bavaria	CSU	344,183	403,637	428,512	498,175	1,105,185	327,180	320,324	3,427,196	51.21%	44	6	50
Social Democratic Party of Germany	SPD	163,061	231,941	334,558	247,277	571,505	238,022	197,615	1,983,979	29.64%	1	28	29
Free Democratic Party	FDP	29,596	45,400	64,861	61,323	170,465	33,149	25,331	430,125	6.43%	0	6	6
Alliance 90/The Greens	Grüne	24,009	50,438	63,995	60,945	163,481	31,869	25,026	419,763	6.27%	0	6	6
The Republicans	REP	21,083	19,564	26,132	30,089	60,555	16,313	16,016	189,752	2.84%	0	0	0
Ecological Democratic Party	ÖDP	10,760	7,624	11,239	14,374	25,869	4,762	7,437	82,065	1.23%	0	0	0
Bavaria Party	BP	5,427	2,059	2,648	5,641	20,803	2,659	3,254	42,491	0.63%	0	0	0
Party of Democratic Socialism	PDS	1,909	3,703	6,614	4,274	14,855	2,831	2,389	36,575	0.55%	0	1	1
Human Environment Animal Protection Party		1,849	2,566	3,445	3,350	8,418	2,164	1,666	23,458	0.35%	0	0	0
The Grays – Gray Panthers	Graue	1,312	2,211	2,935	2,797	6,924	1,468	1,430	19,077	0.29%	0	0	0
Statt Party	STATT	561	1,131	1,633	1,621	3,627	820	617	10,010	0.15%	0	0	0
Party of Bible-abiding Christians	PBC	452	1,059	1,698	1,454	1,536	1,493	490	8,182	0.12%	0	0	0
Natural Law Party		605	688	782	1,588	2,838	479	1,034	8,014	0.12%	0	0	0
Christian League	LIGA	242	466	373	1,559	2,036	266	253	5,195	0.08%	0	0	0
Christian Centre	CM	526	705	683	951	1,316	448	470	5,099	0.08%	0	0	0
Bürgerrechtsbewegung Solidarität	BüSo	76	97	121	145	563	76	135	1,213	0.02%	0	0	0
Marxist–Leninist Party of Germany	MLPD	40	94	190	122	223	88	52	809	0.01%	0	0	0
Valid votes		605,691	773,383	950,419	935,685	2,160,199	664,087	603,539	6,693,003	100.00%	45	47	92
Rejected votes		5,819	7,540	6,242	6,995	13,330	5,336	5,896	51,158	0.76%			
Total polled		611,510	780,923	956,661	942,680	2,173,529	669,423	609,435	6,744,161	76.92%			
Registered electors		851,947	976,888	1,218,369	1,242,220	2,830,243	851,848	795,985	8,767,500				
Turnout		71.78%	79.94%	78.52%	75.89%	76.80%	78.58%	76.56%	76.92%				

The following candidates were elected:

- State seats - Elisabeth Altmann (Grüne); Klaus Barthel (SPD); Hildebrecht Braun (FDP); Eva Bulling-Schröter (PDS); Hans Büttner (SPD); Albert Deß (CSU); Maria Eichhorn (CSU); Petra Ernstberger (SPD); Gabriele Fograscher (SPD); Horst Friedrich (FDP); Günter Gloser (SPD); Peter Glotz (SPD); Angelika Graf (SPD); Gerald Häfner (Grüne); Uwe Hiksch (SPD); Frank Hofmann (SPD); Brunhilde Irber (SPD); Ulrich Irmer (FDP); Helmut Jawurek (CSU); Susanne Kastner (SPD); Peter Keller (CSU); Hans Klein (CSU); Walter Kolbow (SPD); Horst Kubatschka (SPD); Robert Leidinger (SPD); Sabine Leutheusser-Schnarrenberger (FDP); Ursula Männle (CSU); Heide Mattischeck (SPD); Martin Pfaff (SPD); Georg Pfannenstein (SPD); Halo Saibold (Grüne); Christine Scheel (Grüne); Otto Schily (SPD); Cornelia Schmalz-Jacobsen (FDP); Horst Schmidbauer (SPD); Albert Schmidt (Grüne); Erika Simm (SPD); Sigrid Skarpelis-Sperk (SPD); Max Stadler (FDP); Ludwig Stiegler (SPD); Jella Teuchner (SPD); Uta Titze-Stecher (SPD); Günter Verheugen (SPD); Helmut Wilhelm (Grüne); Verena Wohlleben (SPD); Hanna Wolf (SPD); and Heidemarie Wright (SPD).

Substitutions:

- Peter Glotz (SPD) resigned on 24 September 1996 and was replaced by Marlene Rupprecht (SPD) on 25 September 1996.
- Hans Klein (CSU) died on 26 November 1996 and was replaced by Marion Seib (CSU) on 27 November 1996.

Additional state seats following vacation of constituency seats:

- Kurt Faltlhauser (CSU, Munich West) resigned on 20 November 1995 and was replaced by Matthäus Strebl (CSU) on the same day.
- Simon Wittmann (CSU, Weiden) resigned on 21 August 1996 and was replaced by Fritz Wittmann (CSU) on 22 August 1996.

===== 1990 =====
Results of the 1990 federal election held on 2 December 1990:

Party		Second votes per region							Total votes	%	Seats		
Party		Lower Bavaria	Lower Franc- onia	Middle Franc- onia	Swabia	Upper Bavaria	Upper Franc- onia	Upper Pala- tinate	Total votes	%	Con.	Stat.	Tot.
Christian Social Union in Bavaria	CSU	324,742	409,729	405,734	486,600	1,023,469	334,805	317,901	3,302,980	51.88%	43	8	51
Social Democratic Party of Germany	SPD	131,993	194,304	283,707	204,903	533,719	193,634	155,710	1,697,970	26.67%	2	24	26
Free Democratic Party	FDP	33,085	57,240	89,613	76,960	222,205	41,426	31,363	551,892	8.67%	0	9	9
The Republicans	REP	34,848	26,146	44,512	44,005	108,855	28,874	29,419	316,659	4.97%	0	0	0
The Greens	Grüne	18,319	32,626	44,764	40,324	118,451	21,083	17,472	293,039	4.60%	0	0	0
Ecological Democratic Party	ÖDP	8,654	6,768	9,121	14,222	25,493	4,093	6,676	75,027	1.18%	0	0	0
The Grays – Gray Panthers	Graue	4,065	4,918	7,840	7,459	20,256	3,728	4,248	52,514	0.82%	0	0	0
Bavaria Party	BP	3,572	1,475	1,877	3,738	16,192	1,572	2,889	31,315	0.49%	0	0	0
National Democratic Party of Germany	NPD	1,327	1,689	2,892	2,223	3,834	1,288	965	14,218	0.22%	0	0	0
Party of Democratic Socialism	PDS	589	1,271	2,773	1,199	5,945	1,032	913	13,722	0.22%	0	0	0
Christian League	LIGA	767	847	1,308	2,407	3,724	843	746	10,642	0.17%	0	0	0
Christian Centre	CM	638	772	955	999	1,483	610	512	5,969	0.09%	0	0	0
Patriots for Germany		154	111	172	182	329	93	195	1,236	0.02%	0	0	0
Valid votes		562,753	737,896	895,268	885,221	2,083,955	633,081	569,009	6,367,183	100.00%	45	41	86
Rejected votes		6,176	6,707	6,722	7,236	13,772	5,631	6,317	52,561	0.82%			
Total polled		568,929	744,603	901,990	892,457	2,097,727	638,712	575,326	6,419,744	74.44%			
Registered electors		826,318	956,982	1,202,197	1,210,500	2,804,992	843,648	778,933	8,623,570				
Turnout		68.85%	77.81%	75.03%	73.73%	74.79%	75.71%	73.86%	74.44%				

The following candidates were elected:

- State seats - Hans Büchler (SPD); Hans Büttner (SPD); Albert Deß (CSU); Maria Eichhorn (CSU); Norbert Eimer (FDP); Hans A. Engelhard (FDP); Horst Friedrich (FDP); Peter Glotz (SPD); Josef Grünbeck (FDP); Josef Hollerith (CSU); Ulrich Irmer (FDP); Susanne Kastner (SPD); Peter Keller (CSU); Hans Klein (CSU); Walter Kolbow (SPD); Hartmut Koschyk (CSU); Horst Kubatschka (SPD); Uwe Lambinus (SPD); Robert Leidinger (SPD); Sabine Leutheusser-Schnarrenberger (FDP); Ursula Männle (CSU); Heide Mattischeck (SPD); Rudolf Müller (SPD); Johann Paintner (FDP); Martin Pfaff (SPD); Hermann Rind (FDP); Otto Schily (SPD); Cornelia Schmalz-Jacobsen (FDP); Horst Schmidbauer (SPD); Oscar Schneider (CSU); Rudolf Schöfberger (SPD); Erika Simm (SPD); Sigrid Skarpelis-Sperk (SPD); Ludwig Stiegler (SPD); Uta Titze (SPD); Günter Verheugen (SPD); Axel Wernitz (SPD); Hermann Wimmer (SPD); Hans de With (SPD); Verena Wohlleben (SPD); and Hanna Wolf (SPD).

==== 1980s ====
===== 1987 =====
Results of the 1987 federal election held on 25 January 1987:

Party		Second votes per region							Total votes	%	Seats		
Party		Lower Bavaria	Lower Franc- onia	Middle Franc- onia	Swabia	Upper Bavaria	Upper Franc- onia	Upper Pala- tinate	Total votes	%	Con.	Stat.	Tot.
Christian Social Union in Bavaria	CSU	379,336	452,468	452,964	552,538	1,162,850	367,239	348,432	3,715,827	55.14%	45	4	49
Social Democratic Party of Germany	SPD	143,474	207,309	305,469	216,485	540,269	223,708	180,171	1,816,885	26.96%	0	24	24
Free Democratic Party	FDP	37,463	54,816	83,323	76,785	219,820	39,495	34,163	545,865	8.10%	0	7	7
The Greens	Grüne	33,534	51,142	84,340	67,195	208,582	35,876	37,453	518,122	7.69%	0	7	7
National Democratic Party of Germany	NPD	4,062	4,984	8,616	6,403	11,111	4,730	2,907	42,813	0.64%	0	0	0
Ecological Democratic Party	ÖDP	4,101	4,163	4,178	6,025	14,094	1,969	4,959	39,489	0.59%	0	0	0
Bavaria Party	BP	2,938	1,340	1,855	3,648	12,468	1,399	2,719	26,367	0.39%	0	0	0
Women's Party		1,408	1,704	2,041	2,237	4,970	1,186	1,295	14,841	0.22%	0	0	0
Responsible Citizens		650	627	1,168	1,006	2,283	513	467	6,714	0.10%	0	0	0
Christian Bavarian People's Party	CBV	714	294	436	698	1,627	331	1,182	5,282	0.08%	0	0	0
Patriots for Germany		480	326	973	897	1,639	317	543	5,175	0.08%	0	0	0
Marxist–Leninist Party of Germany	MLPD	132	178	328	227	448	190	104	1,607	0.02%	0	0	0
Valid votes		608,292	779,351	945,691	934,144	2,180,161	676,953	614,395	6,738,987	100.00%	45	42	87
Rejected votes		7,633	7,208	7,185	7,774	15,555	5,796	6,563	57,714	0.85%			
Total polled		615,925	786,559	952,876	941,918	2,195,716	682,749	620,958	6,796,701	81.69%			
Registered electors		793,861	925,731	1,162,004	1,166,410	2,696,511	822,533	753,019	8,320,069				
Turnout		77.59%	84.97%	82.00%	80.75%	81.43%	83.01%	82.46%	81.69%				

The following candidates were elected:

- State seats - Max Amling (SPD); Georg Bamberg (SPD); Hans Büchler (SPD); Wolfgang Daniels (Grüne); Norbert Eimer (FDP); Hans A. Engelhard (FDP); Peter Glotz (SPD); Josef Grünbeck (FDP); Dieter Haack (SPD); Gerald Häfner (Grüne); Hildegard Hamm-Brücher (FDP); Ulrich Irmer (FDP); Petra Kelly (Grüne); Karl Kisslinger (SPD); Walter Kolbow (SPD); Matthias Kreuzeder (Grüne); Uwe Lambinus (SPD); Robert Leidinger (SPD); Egon Lutz (SPD); Ursula Männle (CSU); Anke Martiny-Glotz (SPD); Rudolf Müller (SPD); Johann Paintner (FDP); Konrad Porzner (SPD); Hermann Rind (FDP); Bärbel Rust (Grüne); Halo Saibold (Grüne); Alfred Sauter (CSU); Manfred Schmidt (SPD); Renate Schmidt (SPD); Rudolf Schöfberger (SPD); Wolfgang Sieler (SPD); Sigrid Skarpelis-Sperk (SPD); Ludwig Stiegler (SPD); Franz Josef Strauß (CSU); Jürgen Vahlberg (SPD); Günter Verheugen (SPD); Friedrich Voss (CSU); Michael Weiss (Grüne); Axel Wernitz (SPD); Hermann Wimmer (SPD); and Hans de With (SPD).

Substitutions:

- Franz Josef Strauß (CSU) resigned on 19 March 1987 and was replaced by Gerda Hasselfeldt (CSU) on 24 March 1987.
- Alfred Sauter (CSU) resigned on 6 July 1988 and was replaced by Reinhold Kreile (CSU) on 11 July 1988.
- Anke Martiny-Glotz (SPD) resigned on 22 May 1989 and was replaced by Susanne Kastner (SPD) on the same day.
- Reinhold Kreile (CSU) resigned on 22 February 1990 and was replaced by Peter Keller (CSU) on 23 February 1990.
- Konrad Porzner (SPD) resigned on 2 October 1990 and was replaced by Karl Weinhofer (SPD) on 3 October 1990.

Additional state seats following vacation of constituency seats:

- Karl Heinz Lemmrich (CSU, Donau-Ries) resigned on 28 July 1988 and was replaced by Hans Graf Huyn (CSU) on 2 August 1988.
- Alfred Biehle (CSU, Main-Spessart) resigned on 27 April 1990 and was replaced by Josef Brunner (CSU) on 5 May 1990.

===== 1983 =====
Results of the 1983 federal election held on 6 March 1983:

Party		Second votes per region							Total votes	%	Seats		
Party		Lower Bavaria	Lower Franc- onia	Middle Franc- onia	Swabia	Upper Bavaria	Upper Franc- onia	Upper Pala- tinate	Total votes	%	Con.	Stat.	Tot.
Christian Social Union in Bavaria	CSU	443,247	493,583	512,906	623,864	1,250,538	410,215	406,512	4,140,865	59.45%	44	9	53
Social Democratic Party of Germany	SPD	149,439	220,669	336,482	243,543	649,549	241,759	172,958	2,014,399	28.92%	1	25	26
Free Democratic Party	FDP	30,477	44,439	63,769	60,452	170,995	34,403	29,117	433,652	6.23%	0	6	6
The Greens	Grüne	21,428	35,065	53,657	43,605	122,354	23,035	24,757	323,901	4.65%	0	4	4
National Democratic Party of Germany	NPD	1,710	2,241	4,186	3,181	5,354	1,991	1,446	20,109	0.29%	0	0	0
Ecological Democratic Party	ÖDP	758	997	1,971	1,342	3,959	811	1,190	11,028	0.16%	0	0	0
Christian Bavarian People's Party	CBV	1,184	853	1,095	1,662	4,012	727	1,461	10,994	0.16%	0	0	0
German Communist Party	DKP	501	637	1,544	770	2,571	668	641	7,332	0.11%	0	0	0
European Workers' Party	EAP	140	223	286	225	792	138	119	1,923	0.03%	0	0	0
League of West German Communists	BWK	60	79	66	98	274	51	60	688	0.01%	0	0	0
Valid votes		648,944	798,786	975,962	978,742	2,210,398	713,798	638,261	6,964,891	100.00%	45	44	89
Rejected votes		5,976	6,731	7,528	7,573	15,146	5,675	6,545	55,174	0.79%			
Total polled		654,920	805,517	983,490	986,315	2,225,544	719,473	644,806	7,020,065	87.61%			
Registered electors		769,184	898,930	1,125,593	1,127,155	2,546,100	812,036	733,991	8,012,989				
Turnout		85.14%	89.61%	87.38%	87.50%	87.41%	88.60%	87.85%	87.61%				

The following candidates were elected:

- State seats - Max Amling (SPD); Georg Bamberg (SPD); Sabine Bard (Grüne); Gert Bastian (Grüne); Hans Büchler (SPD); Dieter Burgmann (Grüne); Norbert Eimer (FDP); Hans A. Engelhard (FDP); Josef Ertl (FDP); Fritz Gerstl (SPD); Michaela Geiger (CSU); Peter Glotz (SPD); Josef Grünbeck (FDP); Dieter Haack (SPD); Horst Haase (SPD); Hildegard Hamm-Brücher (FDP); Peter Keller (CSU); Petra Kelly (Grüne); Karl Kisslinger (SPD); Hans Klein (CSU); Walter Kolbow (SPD); Reinhold Kreile (CSU); Ursula Krone-Appuhn (CSU); Uwe Lambinus (SPD); Egon Lutz (SPD); Ursula Männle (CSU); Anke Martiny-Glotz (SPD); Rudolf Müller (SPD); Johann Paintner (FDP); Konrad Porzner (SPD); Alfred Sauter (CSU); Renate Schmidt (SPD); Rudolf Schöfberger (SPD); Wolfgang Sieler (SPD); Sigrid Skarpelis-Sperk (SPD); Ludwig Stiegler (SPD); Jürgen Vahlberg (SPD); Günter Verheugen (SPD); Ekkehard Voigt (CSU); Friedrich Voss (CSU); Karl Weinhofer (SPD); Axel Wernitz (SPD); Hermann Wimmer (SPD); and Hans de With (SPD).

Substitutions:

- Dieter Burgmann (Grüne) resigned on 15 March 1985 and was replaced by Axel Vogel (Grüne) on 16 March 1985.
- Sabine Bard (Grüne) resigned on 31 March 1985 and was replaced by Eberhard Bueb (Grüne) on 1 April 1985.

Additional state seats following vacation of constituency seats:

- Klaus Hartmann (CSU, Erlangen) resigned on 4 June 1984 and was replaced by Wolfgang Götzer (CSU) on the same day.
- Franz-Ludwig Schenk Graf von Stauffenberg (CSU, Starnberg) resigned on 20 November 1984 and was replaced by Simon Wittmann (CSU) on the same day.
- Walter Althammer (CSU, Augsburg-Land) resigned on 14 April 1985 and was replaced by Ernst Josef Pöppl (CSU) on 15 April 1985.

===== 1980 =====
Results of the 1980 federal election held on 5 October 1980:

Party		Second votes per region							Total votes	%	Seats		
Party		Lower Bavaria	Lower Franc- onia	Middle Franc- onia	Swabia	Upper Bavaria	Upper Franc- onia	Upper Pala- tinate	Total votes	%	Con.	Stat.	Tot.
Christian Social Union in Bavaria	CSU	424,215	464,354	468,911	582,444	1,196,547	378,784	393,204	3,908,459	57.59%	40	12	52
Social Democratic Party of Germany	SPD	164,535	248,136	376,069	275,926	687,670	275,958	192,659	2,220,953	32.73%	5	25	30
Free Democratic Party	FDP	27,680	51,500	91,020	69,446	222,888	40,086	30,000	532,620	7.85%	0	7	7
The Greens	Grüne	7,620	10,893	14,871	13,191	29,311	7,373	6,063	89,322	1.32%	0	0	0
National Democratic Party of Germany	NPD	1,146	1,763	3,427	2,447	4,890	1,569	1,066	16,308	0.24%	0	0	0
German Communist Party	DKP	539	702	1,798	818	2,971	717	613	8,158	0.12%	0	0	0
Christian Bavarian People's Party	CBV	536	290	317	501	1,616	196	490	3,946	0.06%	0	0	0
Citizens' Party	BP	243	352	478	494	1,302	365	299	3,533	0.05%	0	0	0
European Workers' Party	EAP	102	101	179	144	516	95	84	1,221	0.02%	0	0	0
People's Front Against Reaction, Fascism and War	VF	55	206	256	139	284	101	83	1,124	0.02%	0	0	0
Communist League of West Germany	KBW	43	77	113	87	286	49	66	721	0.01%	0	0	0
Valid votes		626,714	778,374	957,439	945,637	2,148,281	705,293	624,627	6,786,365	100.00%	45	44	89
Rejected votes		8,578	8,176	8,763	9,391	18,124	6,877	8,506	68,415	1.00%			
Total polled		635,292	786,550	966,202	955,028	2,166,405	712,170	633,133	6,854,780	87.57%			
Registered electors		746,809	877,713	1,104,714	1,098,409	2,482,107	800,659	717,009	7,827,420				
Turnout		85.07%	89.61%	87.46%	86.95%	87.28%	88.95%	88.30%	87.57%				

The following candidates were elected:

- State seats - Max Amling (SPD); Norbert Eimer (FDP); Hans A. Engelhard (FDP); Josef Ertl (FDP); Peter Feile (SPD); Michaela Geiger (CSU); Fritz Gerstl (SPD); Dieter Haack (SPD); Horst Haase (SPD); Hildegard Hamm-Brücher (FDP); Ernst Hinsken (CSU); Peter Wilhelm Höffkes (CSU); Karl Hofmann (SPD); Peter Keller (CSU); Hans Klein (CSU); Walter Kolbow (SPD); Reinhold Kreile (CSU); Ursula Krone-Appuhn (CSU); Uwe Lambinus (SPD); Manfred Marschall (SPD); Anke Martiny-Glotz (SPD); Richard Müller (SPD); Rudolf Müller (SPD); Johann Paintner (FDP); Karl-Heinz Popp (FDP); Konrad Porzner (SPD); Philip Rosenthal (SPD); Alfred Sauter (CSU); Hermann Schätz (SPD); Hansheinrich Schmidt (FDP); Oscar Schneider (CSU); Rudolf Schöfberger (SPD); Wolfgang Sieler (SPD); Sigrid Skarpelis-Sperk (SPD); Ludwig Stiegler (SPD); Wilhelm Stöckl (SPD); Friedrich Voss (CSU); Jürgen Warnke (CSU); Karl Weinhofer (SPD); Axel Wernitz (SPD); Hermann Wimmer (SPD); Manfred Wimmer (SPD); Hans de With (SPD); and Fritz Wittmann (CSU).

Substitutions:

- Konrad Porzner (SPD) resigned on 28 January 1981 and was replaced by Georg Bamberg (SPD) on 2 February 1981.

Additional state seats following vacation of constituency seats:

- Hans-Jochen Vogel (SPD, Munich North) resigned on 28 January 1981 and was replaced by Kurt Ueberschär (SPD) on 2 February 1981.
- Paul Röhner (CSU, Bamberg) resigned on 11 May 1982 and was replaced by Ekkehard Voigt (CSU) on 14 May 1982.
- Eicke Götz (CSU, Fürstenfeldbruck) resigned on 8 March 1983 and was replaced by Ursula Männle (CSU) on 17 March 1983.

==== 1970s ====
===== 1976 =====
Results of the 1976 federal election held on 3 October 1976:

Party		Second votes per region							Total votes	%	Seats		
Party		Lower Bavaria	Lower Franc- onia	Middle Franc- onia	Swabia	Upper Bavaria	Upper Franc- onia	Upper Pala- tinate	Total votes	%	Con.	Stat.	Tot.
Christian Social Union in Bavaria	CSU	431,230	478,417	489,111	596,975	1,238,794	390,849	402,123	4,027,499	59.99%	40	13	53
Social Democratic Party of Germany	SPD	160,786	242,552	383,825	277,629	677,135	276,044	183,721	2,201,692	32.79%	4	25	29
Free Democratic Party	FDP	21,525	40,347	71,362	54,458	177,562	31,922	22,159	419,335	6.25%	0	6	6
National Democratic Party of Germany	NPD	2,549	3,187	5,591	4,157	7,229	3,398	2,974	29,085	0.43%	0	0	0
German Communist Party	DKP	952	1,290	2,852	1,492	4,801	1,108	1,016	13,511	0.20%	0	0	0
Christian Bavarian People's Party	CBV	758	290	316	655	2,444	275	1,982	6,720	0.10%	0	0	0
Action Group of Independent Germans	AUD	412	342	1,112	656	2,029	308	383	5,242	0.08%	0	0	0
Communist Party of Germany (Organisational Structure)	KPD (AO)	267	388	624	696	1,899	432	305	4,611	0.07%	0	0	0
5%-Block		294	293	422	460	1,022	237	212	2,940	0.04%	0	0	0
Action Community Fourth Party	AVP	127	130	189	332	757	134	108	1,777	0.03%	0	0	0
European Workers' Party	EAP	125	112	142	168	560	85	91	1,283	0.02%	0	0	0
Valid votes		619,025	767,348	955,546	937,678	2,114,232	704,792	615,074	6,713,695	100.00%	44	44	88
Rejected votes		6,672	6,638	6,493	7,080	12,443	5,694	6,124	51,144	0.76%			
Total polled		625,697	773,986	962,039	944,758	2,126,675	710,486	621,198	6,764,839	89.63%			
Registered electors		714,554	845,835	1,076,357	1,055,932	2,383,447	780,815	690,880	7,547,820				
Turnout		87.56%	91.51%	89.38%	89.47%	89.23%	90.99%	89.91%	89.63%				

The following candidates were elected:

- State seats - Max Amling (SPD); Alfons Bayerl (SPD); Walter Becher (CSU); Norbert Eimer (FDP); Hans A. Engelhard (FDP); Josef Ertl (FDP); Ludwig Fellermaier (SPD); Bruno Friedrich (SPD); Franz Xaver Geisenhofer (CSU); Fritz Gerstl (SPD); Peter Glotz (SPD); Dieter Haack (SPD); Horst Haase (SPD); Fritz Haberl (CSU); Hildegard Hamm-Brücher (FDP); Peter Wilhelm Höffkes (CSU); Karl Hofmann (SPD); Reinhold Kreile (CSU); Ursula Krone-Appuhn (CSU); Dieter Lattmann (SPD); Eduard Lintner (CSU); Manfred Marschall (SPD); Anke Martiny-Glotz (SPD); Richard Müller (SPD); Rudolf Müller (SPD); Johann Paintner (FDP); Konrad Porzner (SPD); Philip Rosenthal (SPD); Ursula Schleicher (CSU); Hansheinrich Schmidt (FDP); Manfred Schmidt (SPD); Oscar Schneider (CSU); Rudolf Schöfberger (SPD); Wolfgang Sieler (SPD); Wilhelm Stöckl (SPD); Friedrich Voss (CSU); Jürgen Warnke (CSU); Axel Wernitz (SPD); Hermann Wimmer (SPD); Hans de With (SPD); Fritz Wittmann (CSU); Franz Zebisch (SPD); and Erich Ziegler (CSU).

Substitutions:

- Peter Glotz (SPD) resigned on 16 May 1977 and was replaced by Uwe Lambinus (SPD) on 20 May 1977.
- Heinrich Reichold (CSU) died on 2 October 1979 and was replaced by Ursula Männle (CSU) on 4 October 1979.

Additional state seats following vacation of constituency seats:

- Alex Hösl (CSU, Bad Kissingen) died on 20 March 1977 and was replaced by Klaus Rose (CSU) on 24 March 1977.
- Franz Josef Strauss (CSU, Weilheim) resigned on 29 November 1978 and was replaced by Heinrich Reichold (CSU) on 4 December 1978.
- Peter Schmidhuber (CSU, Munich West) resigned on 6 December 1978 and was replaced by Ekkehard Voigt (CSU) on 8 December 1978.

===== 1972 =====
Results of the 1972 federal election held on 19 November 1972:

Party		Second votes per region							Total votes	%	Seats		
Party		Lower Bavaria	Lower Franc- onia	Middle Franc- onia	Swabia	Upper Bavaria	Upper Franc- onia	Upper Pala- tinate	Total votes	%	Con.	Stat.	Tot.
Christian Social Union in Bavaria	CSU	398,297	436,284	435,434	543,327	1,081,821	354,593	365,427	3,615,183	55.08%	31	17	48
Social Democratic Party of Germany	SPD	180,717	262,126	422,718	317,422	793,716	301,176	205,261	2,483,136	37.83%	13	20	33
Free Democratic Party	FDP	17,434	40,990	77,253	50,838	158,842	33,828	20,369	399,554	6.09%	0	5	5
National Democratic Party of Germany	NPD	4,133	4,824	9,187	6,951	11,907	5,171	4,967	47,140	0.72%	0	0	0
German Communist Party	DKP	882	1,299	2,853	1,555	4,748	1,291	979	13,607	0.21%	0	0	0
European Federalist Party	EFP	390	528	706	749	2,115	345	337	5,170	0.08%	0	0	0
Valid votes		601,853	746,051	948,151	920,842	2,053,149	696,404	597,340	6,563,790	100.00%	44	42	86
Rejected votes		8,244	7,724	7,942	8,541	14,744	7,209	8,022	62,426	0.94%			
Total polled		610,097	753,775	956,093	929,383	2,067,893	703,613	605,362	6,626,216	89.85%			
Registered electors		694,852	823,609	1,065,972	1,033,575	2,306,905	776,547	673,686	7,375,146				
Turnout		87.80%	91.52%	89.69%	89.92%	89.64%	90.61%	89.86%	89.85%				

The following candidates were elected:

- State seats - Alfons Bayerl (SPD); Walter Becher (CSU); Herbert Christ (FDP); Werner Dollinger (CSU); Hans A. Engelhard (FDP); Josef Ertl (FDP); Ludwig Fellermaier (SPD); Bruno Friedrich (SPD); Karl Geldner (FDP); Franz Xaver Geisenhofer (CSU); Fritz Gerstl (SPD); Peter Glotz (SPD); Karl Herold (SPD); Georg Kahn-Ackermann (SPD); Reinhold Kreile (CSU); Uwe Lambinus (SPD); Dieter Lattmann (SPD); Hans Lautenschlager (SPD); Günther Müller (CSU); Rudolf Müller (SPD); Konrad Porzner (SPD); Anke Riedel-Martiny (SPD); Erich Riedl (CSU); Hans Roser (CSU); Albert Schedl (CSU); Ursula Schleicher (CSU); Peter Schmidhuber (CSU); Hansheinrich Schmidt (FDP); Oscar Schneider (CSU); Philipp Seibert (SPD); Paul Simon (SPD); Heinz Starke (CSU); Hans-Jochen Vogel (SPD); Theo Waigel (CSU); Jürgen Warnke (CSU); Axel Wernitz (SPD); Hans de With (SPD); Fritz Wittmann (CSU); Otto Wittmann (SPD); Franz Zebisch (SPD); Erich Ziegler (CSU); and Siegfried Zoglmann (CSU).

Substitutions:

- Georg Kahn-Ackermann (SPD) resigned on 18 September 1974 and was replaced by Manfred Wimmer (SPD) on the same day.

==== 1960s ====
===== 1969 =====
Results of the 1969 federal election held on 28 September 1969:

Party		Second votes per region							Total votes	%	Seats		
Party		Lower Bavaria	Lower Franc- onia	Middle Franc- onia	Swabia	Upper Bavaria	Upper Franc- onia	Upper Pala- tinate	Total votes	%	Con.	Stat.	Tot.
Christian Social Union in Bavaria	CSU	359,132	384,390	391,149	480,408	850,546	324,755	325,272	3,115,652	54.37%	34	15	49
Social Democratic Party of Germany	SPD	131,494	205,436	327,867	256,084	658,468	250,685	152,986	1,983,020	34.60%	10	21	31
National Democratic Party of Germany	NPD	25,325	29,950	61,159	38,420	84,401	38,584	25,989	303,828	5.30%	0	0	0
Free Democratic Party	FDP	9,515	24,201	46,695	31,087	84,867	22,322	14,193	232,880	4.06%	0	4	4
Campaign for Democratic Progress	ADF	986	2,039	6,470	2,930	8,809	2,637	1,560	25,431	0.44%	0	0	0
Bavaria Party	BP	9,754	3,182	4,131	7,760	36,333	4,078	4,439	49,694	0.87%	0	0	0
European Party	EP	9,754	3,182	4,131	7,760	36,333	4,078	4,439	9,044	0.16%	0	0	0
All-German Party	GDP	9,754	3,182	4,131	7,760	36,333	4,078	4,439	8,485	0.15%	0	0	0
Free Social Union	FSU	9,754	3,182	4,131	7,760	36,333	4,078	4,439	2,454	0.04%	0	0	0
Valid votes		536,206	649,198	837,471	816,689	1,723,424	643,061	524,439	5,730,488	100.00%	44	40	84
Rejected votes		14,827	13,202	15,934	13,824	23,914	12,367	13,168	107,236	1.84%			
Total polled		551,033	662,400	853,405	830,513	1,747,338	655,428	537,607	5,837,724	85.20%			
Registered electors		661,520	754,201	1,000,617	972,794	2,094,270	755,809	612,435	6,851,646				
Turnout		83.30%	87.83%	85.29%	85.37%	83.43%	86.72%	87.78%	85.20%				

The following candidates were elected:

- State seats - Hans Bals (SPD); Hannsheinz Bauer (SPD); Alfons Bayerl (SPD); Walter Becher (CSU); Fritz Böhm (SPD); Josef Ertl (FDP); Ludwig Fellermaier (SPD); Walter Fritsch (SPD); Karl Fuchs (CSU); Ingeborg Geisendörfer (CSU); Franz Xaver Geisenhofer (CSU); Karl Theodor Freiherr von und zu Guttenberg (CSU); Hermann Haage (SPD); Albrecht Haas (FDP); Karl Herold (SPD); Ignaz Kiechle (CSU); Gisbert Kley (CSU); Richard Kohlberger (SPD); Reinhold Kreile (CSU); Edeltraud Kuchtner (CSU); Walter Langebeck (SPD); Hans Lautenschlager (SPD); Konrad Porzner (SPD); Gerhard Reischl (SPD); Erich Riedl (CSU); Hans Roser (CSU); Christoph Schiller (SPD); Hansheinrich Schmidt (FDP); Oscar Schneider (CSU); Philipp Seibert (SPD); Max Seidel (SPD); Paul Simon (SPD); Karl-Heinz Spilker (CSU); Heinz Starke (FDP); Alois Strohmayr (SPD); Jürgen Warnke (CSU); Hans de With (SPD); Otto Wittmann (SPD); Franz Zebisch (SPD); and Erich Ziegler (CSU).

Substitutions:

- Albrecht Haas (FDP) died on 20 January 1970 and was replaced by Karl Geldner (FDP) on 26 January 1970.
- Hermann Haage (SPD) died on 21 December 1970 and was replaced by Georg Kahn-Ackermann (SPD) on 28 December 1970.
- Karl Theodor Freiherr von und zu Guttenberg (CSU) resigned on 6 June 1972 and was replaced by Roland Cantzler (CSU) on 7 June 1972.

Additional state seats following vacation of constituency seats:

- Franz Xaver Unertl (CSU, Passau) died on 31 December 1970 and was replaced by Albert Schedl (CSU) on 7 January 1971.
- Wolfgang Pohle (CSU, Kempten) died on 27 August 1971 and was replaced by Fritz Wittmann (CSU) on 6 September 1971.
- Martin Hirsch (SPD, Hof) resigned on 8 December 1971 and was replaced by Hans Büchler (SPD) on 9 December 1971.
- Valentin Dasch (CSU, Altötting) resigned on 15 September 1972 and was replaced by Herbert Prochazka (CSU) on 18 September 1972.
- Georg Ehnes (CSU, Ansbach) resigned on 19 September 1972 and was replaced by Otto Menth (CSU) on the same day.

===== 1965 =====
Results of the 1965 federal election held on 19 September 1965:

Party		Second votes per region								Total votes	%	Seats		
Party		Lower Bavaria	Lower Franc- onia	Middle Franc- onia	Swabia	Upper Bavaria	Upper Franc- onia	Upper Pala- tinate	Postal votes	Total votes	%	Con.	Stat.	Tot.
Christian Social Union in Bavaria	CSU	350,226	352,037	371,461	440,490	775,008	307,841	313,682	225,761	3,136,506	55.60%	36	13	49
Social Democratic Party of Germany	SPD	133,930	177,290	274,330	233,148	547,610	242,338	146,091	114,730	1,869,467	33.14%	8	22	30
Free Democratic Party	FDP	17,338	44,654	72,011	52,578	118,306	41,033	22,956	44,868	413,744	7.33%	0	7	7
National Democratic Party of Germany	NPD	11,262	16,199	50,778	25,158	62,403	23,478	12,475	20,021	149,975	2.66%	0	0	0
German Peace Union	DFU	11,262	16,199	50,778	25,158	62,403	23,478	12,475	20,021	60,561	1.07%	0	0	0
Action Group of Independent Germans	AUD	11,262	16,199	50,778	25,158	62,403	23,478	12,475	20,021	11,238	0.20%	0	0	0
Valid votes		512,756	590,180	768,580	751,374	1,503,327	614,690	495,204	405,380	5,641,491	100.00%	44	42	86
Rejected votes		20,447	20,252	19,864	21,483	38,507	19,583	18,437	2,940	161,513	2.78%			
Total polled		533,203	610,432	788,444	772,857	1,541,834	634,273	513,641	408,320	5,803,004	85.94%			
Registered electors		658,542	747,841	991,928	960,052	2,021,277	764,173	608,463		6,752,276				
Turnout		80.97%	81.63%	79.49%	80.50%	76.28%	83.00%	84.42%		85.94%				

The following candidates were elected:

- State seats - Siegfried Balke (CSU); Hans Bals (SPD); Hannsheinz Bauer (SPD); Walter Becher (CSU); Fritz Böhm (SPD); Thomas Dehler (FDP); Walter Eckhardt (CSU); Josef Ertl (FDP); Josef Felder (SPD); Ludwig Fellermaier (SPD); Walter Fritsch (SPD); Ingeborg Geisendörfer (CSU); Karl Geldner (FDP); Hermann Haage (SPD); Albrecht Haas (FDP); Herbert Hauffe (SPD); Karl Herold (SPD); Franz Höhne (SPD); Fritz Wilhelm Hörauf (SPD); Georg Kahn-Ackermann (SPD); Richard Kohlberger (SPD); Werner Kubitza (FDP); Edeltraud Kuchtner (CSU); Walter Langebeck (SPD); Hans Lautenschlager (SPD); Edmund Leukert (CSU); Konrad Porzner (SPD); Herbert Prochazka (CSU); Gerhard Reischl (SPD); Manfred Schlager (CSU); Peter Schmidhuber (CSU); Hansheinrich Schmidt (FDP); Philipp Seibert (SPD); Max Seidel (SPD); Wolfgang Stammberger (SPD); Heinz Starke (FDP); Georg Stiller (CSU); Alois Strohmayr (SPD); Karl Wieninger (CSU); Franz Zebisch (SPD); and Erich Ziegler (CSU).

Substitutions:

- Thomas Dehler (FDP) died on 21 July 1967 and was replaced by Werner Porsch (FDP) on 27 July 1967.

Additional state seats following vacation of constituency seats:

- Maria Probst (CSU, Karlstadt) died on 1 May 1967 and was replaced by Franz Xaver Geisenhofer (CSU) on 3 May 1967.
- Walter Seuffert (SPD, Munich North) resigned on 18 October 1967 and was replaced by Alfons Bayerl SPD) on 27 October 1967.
- Konstantin Prinz von Bayern (CSU, Munich Centre) died on 30 July 1969 and was replaced by Josef Spies (CSU) on 4 August 1969.

===== 1961 =====
Results of the 1961 federal election held on 17 September 1961:

Party		Second votes per region								Total votes	%	Seats		
Party		Lower Bavaria	Lower Franc- onia	Middle Franc- onia	Swabia	Upper Bavaria	Upper Franc- onia	Upper Pala- tinate	Postal votes	Total votes	%	Con.	Stat.	Tot.
Christian Social Union in Bavaria	CSU	344,934	346,957	372,770	411,564	735,983	309,759	309,964	182,540	3,014,471	54.94%	42	8	50
Social Democratic Party of Germany	SPD	114,378	163,806	246,615	210,185	483,132	226,104	132,323	76,099	1,652,642	30.12%	5	23	28
Free Democratic Party	FDP	20,654	49,304	98,940	66,539	127,222	49,900	26,130	41,141	479,830	8.74%	0	8	8
All-German Party	GDP	25,252	23,510	21,073	34,387	59,382	25,779	14,467	12,310	216,160	3.94%	0	0	0
German Peace Union	DFU	3,968	7,736	16,016	11,349	32,422	6,100	4,515	5,282	87,388	1.59%	0	0	0
Deutsche Reichspartei	DRP	2,448	2,491	5,337	2,729	8,325	4,009	1,865	1,495	28,699	0.52%	0	0	0
German Community	DG	638	278	2,149	1,825	1,379	394	728	381	7,772	0.14%	0	0	0
Valid votes		512,272	594,082	762,900	738,578	1,447,845	622,045	489,992	319,248	5,486,962	100.00%	47	39	86
Rejected votes		28,380	26,782	30,271	34,983	54,169	25,042	24,207	3,749	227,583	3.98%			
Total polled		540,652	620,864	793,171	773,561	1,502,014	647,087	514,199	322,997	5,714,545	87.22%			
Registered electors		648,089	729,137	971,554	926,768	1,923,513	758,776	593,891		6,551,728				
Turnout		83.42%	85.15%	81.64%	83.47%	78.09%	85.28%	86.58%		87.22%				

The following candidates were elected:

- State seats - Hans Bals (SPD); Hannsheinz Bauer (SPD); Thomas Dehler (FDP); Josef Ertl (FDP); Josef Felder (SPD); Erwin Folger (SPD); Walter Fritsch (SPD); Ingeborg Geisendörfer (CSU); Hermann Haage (SPD); Fritz von Haniel-Niethammer (CSU); Karl Herold (SPD); Wilhelm Hoegner (SPD); Franz Höhne (SPD); Fritz Wilhelm Hörauf (SPD); Richard Kohlberger (SPD); Gerhard Kreyssig (SPD); Werner Kubitza (FDP); Edeltraud Kuchtner (CSU); Georg Kurlbaum (SPD); Walter Langebeck (SPD); Hans Lautenschlager (SPD); Karl Heinz Lemmrich (CSU); Rudolf Metter (SPD); Hans Müller (SPD); Leonhard Murr (FDP); Gerhard Reischl (SPD); Richard Reitzner (SPD); Hansheinrich Schmidt (FDP); Philipp Seibert (SPD); Walter Seuffert (SPD); Wolfgang Stammberger (FDP); Heinz Starke (FDP); Georg Stiller (CSU); Alois Strohmayr (SPD); Ernst Supf (FDP); Gerhard Wacher (CSU); Leo Wagner (CSU); and Ernst Zühlke (SPD).

Substitutions:

- Wilhelm Hoegner (SPD) resigned on 4 January 1962 and was replaced by Georg Kahn-Ackermann (SPD) on 10 January 1962.
- Richard Reitzner (SPD) died on 11 May 1962 and was replaced by Konrad Porzner (SPD) on 21 May 1962.
- Gerhard Wacher (CSU) resigned on 26 March 1963 and was replaced by Erich Ziegler (CSU) on 1 April 1963.
- Georg Lang (CSU) died on 1 June 1965 and was replaced by Helmut Geiger (CSU) on 8 June 1965.

Additional state seats following vacation of constituency seats:

- Philipp Meyer (CSU, Donauwörth) died on 29 January 1962 and was replaced by Friedrich Winter (CSU) on 2 February 1962.
- Georg von Manteuffel-Szoege (CSU, Schwabach) died on 8 June 1962 and was replaced by Edmund Leukert (CSU) on 27 June 1962.
- Hans Schütz (CSU, Dillingen) resigned on 5 February 1963 and was replaced by Albrecht Schlee (CSU) on 15 February 1963.
- Friedrich Funk (CSU, Schweinfurt) died on 5 August 1963 and was replaced by Centa Haas (CSU) on 9 August 1963.
- Josef Lermer (CSU, Straubing) died on 15 July 1964 and was replaced by Walter Eckhardt (CSU) on 21 July 1964.
- Emil Kemmer (CSU, Bamberg) resigned on 7 October 1964 and was replaced by Franz Wittmann (CSU) on 26 October 1964.

==== 1950s ====
===== 1957 =====
Results of the 1957 federal election held on 15 September 1957:

Party		Second votes per region								Total votes	%	Seats		
Party		Lower Bavaria	Lower Franc- onia	Middle Franc- onia	Swabia	Upper Bavaria	Upper Franc- onia	Upper Pala- tinate	Postal votes	Total votes	%	Con.	Stat.	Tot.
Christian Social Union in Bavaria	CSU	321,680	353,755	388,516	446,220	711,353	324,716	307,617	162,035	3,015,892	57.19%	47	6	53
Social Democratic Party of Germany	SPD	100,530	134,643	234,018	152,800	420,578	186,700	118,791	46,751	1,394,811	26.45%	0	25	25
All-German Bloc/ League of Expellees and Deprived of Rights	GB/BHE	44,851	38,846	38,183	56,441	93,513	44,197	25,913	15,175	357,119	6.77%	0	0	0
Free Democratic Party	FDP	7,884	31,306	53,629	30,258	53,949	30,309	14,968	18,392	240,695	4.56%	0	4	4
Federalist Union	FU	29,550	6,858	6,260	20,270	76,999	11,517	10,376	6,380	168,210	3.19%	0	0	0
German Party	DP	2,777	2,929	4,132	8,428	11,559	5,029	1,572	2,380	38,806	0.74%	0	0	0
Deutsche Reichspartei	DRP	2,799	4,205	14,402	6,485	14,046	9,465	4,063	2,643	24,902	0.47%	0	0	0
German Middle Class	UDM	2,799	4,205	14,402	6,485	14,046	9,465	4,063	2,643	12,520	0.24%	0	0	0
Bund der Deutschen	BdD	2,799	4,205	14,402	6,485	14,046	9,465	4,063	2,643	10,675	0.20%	0	0	0
Patriotic Union	VU	2,799	4,205	14,402	6,485	14,046	9,465	4,063	2,643	5,020	0.10%	0	0	0
German Community	DG	2,799	4,205	14,402	6,485	14,046	9,465	4,063	2,643	4,991	0.09%	0	0	0
Valid votes		510,071	572,542	739,140	720,902	1,381,997	611,933	483,300	253,756	5,273,641	100.00%	47	35	82
Rejected votes		21,615	26,611	30,248	28,453	45,282	23,592	17,703	3,202	196,706	3.60%			
Total polled		531,686	599,153	769,388	749,355	1,427,279	635,525	501,003	256,958	5,470,347	87.66%			
Registered electors		635,816	694,897	923,914	882,064	1,794,566	737,990	571,252		6,240,499				
Turnout		83.62%	86.22%	83.27%	84.95%	79.53%	86.12%	87.70%		87.66%				

The following candidates were elected:

- State seats - Lisa Albrecht (SPD); Adolf Arndt (SPD); Hans Bals (SPD); Hannsheinz Bauer (SPD); Valentin Baur (SPD); Arno Behrisch (SPD); Thomas Dehler (FDP); Georg Dewald (SPD); Josef Felder (SPD); Otto Freiherr von Feury (CSU); Alfred Frenzel (SPD); Ingeborg Geisendörfer (CSU); Hermann Haage (SPD); Fritz von Haniel-Niethammer (CSU); Herbert Hauffe (SPD); Karl Herold (SPD); Franz Höhne (SPD); Fritz Wilhelm Hörauf (SPD); Angelo Kramel (CSU); Gerhard Kreyssig (SPD); Edeltraud Kuchtner (CSU); Georg Kurlbaum (SPD); Franz Marx (SPD); Rudolf Metter (SPD); Hans Müller (SPD); Leonhard Murr (FDP); Carl Prennel (SPD); Richard Reitzner (SPD); Max Seidel (SPD); Walter Seuffert (SPD); Wolfgang Stammberger (FDP); Heinz Starke (FDP); Käte Strobel (SPD); Franz Wittmann (CSU); and Ernst Zühlke (SPD).

Substitutions:

- Otto Freiherr von Feury (CSU) resigned on 10 December 1957 and was replaced by Walter Eckhardt (CSU) on 27 December 1957.
- Lisa Albrecht (SPD) died on 16 May 1958 and was replaced by Erwin Folger (SPD) on 19 May 1958.
- Alfred Frenzel (SPD) resigned on 4 November 1960 and was replaced by Hans Lautenschlager (SPD) on 9 November 1960.

Additional state seats following vacation of constituency seats:

- Wolfgang Klausner (CSU, Traunstein) died on 17 April 1958 and was replaced by Edmund Leukert (CSU) on 21 April 1958.
- Josef Oesterle (CSU, Augsburg-Land) died on 31 August 1959 and was replaced by Georg Graf Henckel von Donnersmarck (CSU) on 5 September 1959.

===== 1953 =====
Results of the 1953 federal election held on 6 September 1953:

Party		Second votes per region								Total votes	%	Seats		
Party		Lower Bavaria	Lower Franc- onia	Middle Franc- onia	Swabia	Upper Bavaria	Upper Franc- onia	Upper Pala- tinate	Lindau	Total votes	%	Con.	Stat.	Tot.
Christian Social Union in Bavaria	CSU	285,379	325,719	299,307	392,278	591,131	239,256	269,950	24,367	2,427,387	47.84%	42	10	52
Social Democratic Party of Germany	SPD	87,413	121,020	217,155	129,440	335,500	179,700	108,805	5,229	1,184,262	23.34%	3	22	25
Bavaria Party	BP	80,524	22,869	21,613	58,795	193,993	53,404	33,451	992	465,641	9.18%	0	0	0
All-German Bloc/ League of Expellees and Deprived of Rights	GB/BHE	60,100	48,831	47,597	67,795	110,968	50,761	30,206	1,695	417,953	8.24%	0	8	8
Free Democratic Party	FDP	12,530	40,536	76,872	35,107	71,314	59,469	16,516	3,150	315,494	6.22%	2	4	6
Communist Party of Germany	KPD	4,632	6,656	18,055	6,524	31,425	8,223	5,818	209	81,542	1.61%	0	0	0
Deutsche Reichspartei	DRP	3,775	5,862	27,934	4,322	12,189	16,236	7,644	200	78,162	1.54%	0	0	0
German Party	DP	3,687	2,759	6,836	6,733	11,493	8,357	3,254	312	43,431	0.86%	0	0	0
All-German People's Party	GVP	1,138	2,423	8,437	3,597	10,166	3,018	2,669	211	31,659	0.62%	0	0	0
Umbrella Organisation of the National Collection	DNS	1,009	943	2,903	5,747	6,977	7,184	3,167	95	28,025	0.55%	0	0	0
Valid votes		540,187	577,618	726,709	710,338	1,375,156	625,608	481,480	36,460	5,073,556	100.00%	47	44	91
Rejected votes		22,622	22,771	29,537	21,896	50,835	23,281	17,986	1,333	190,261	3.61%			
Total polled		562,809	600,389	756,246	732,234	1,425,991	648,889	499,466	37,793	5,263,817	85.80%			
Registered electors		652,088	680,548	882,703	834,987	1,748,352	731,919	560,651	43,572	6,134,820				
Turnout		86.31%	88.22%	85.67%	87.69%	81.56%	88.66%	89.09%	86.74%	85.80%				

The following candidates were elected:

- State seats - Lisa Albrecht (SPD); Hans Bals (SPD); Hannsheinz Bauer (SPD); Valentin Baur (SPD); Arno Behrisch (SPD); Reinhold F. Bender (GB/BHE); Thomas Dehler (FDP); Georg Dewald (SPD); Walter Eckhardt (GB/BHE); Alfred Frenzel (SPD); Konrad Frühwald (FDP); Ingeborg Geisendörfer (CSU); Georg Graf Henckel von Donnersmarck (CSU); Karl Herold (SPD); Franz Höhne (SPD); Fritz Wilhelm Hörauf (SPD); Herta Ilk (FDP); Georg Kahn-Ackermann (SPD); Wilfried Keller (GB/BHE); Otto Klötzer (GB/BHE); Gerhard Kreyssig (SPD); Edeltraud Kuchtner (CSU); Georg Kurlbaum (SPD); Georg Lang (CSU); Edmund Leukert (CSU); Franz Marx (SPD); Anton Miller (CSU); Hans Müller (SPD); Theodor Oberländer (GB/BHE); Franz Op den Orth (SPD); Willy Reichstein (GB/BHE); Richard Reitzner (SPD); Walter Rinke (CSU); Walter Seuffert (SPD); Paul Sornik (GB/BHE); Georg Stiller (CSU); Käte Strobel (SPD); Johannes-Helmut Strosche (GB/BHE); Willy Thieme (SPD); Gerhard Wacher (CSU); Josef Wagner (SPD); Hans Wellhausen (FDP); Franz Wittmann (CSU); and Ernst Zühlke (SPD).

Additional state seats following vacation of constituency seats:

- Walter Sassnick (SPD, Nuremberg) died on 6 November 1955 and was replaced by Carl Prennel (SPD) on 9 November 1955.
- Karl von Spreti (CSU, Kempten) resigned on 5 March 1956 and was replaced by Friedrich Winter (CSU) on 6 March 1956.

==== 1940s ====
===== 1949 =====
Results of the 1949 federal election held on 14 August 1949:

Party		Votes	%	Seats		
Party		Votes	%	Con.	Stat.	Tot.
Christian Social Union in Bavaria	CSU	1,380,448	29.20%	24	0	24
Social Democratic Party of Germany	SPD	1,075,416	22.75%	12	6	18
Bavaria Party	BP	986,478	20.87%	11	6	17
Economic Reconstruction Union	WAV	681,888	14.42%	0	12	12
Free Democratic Party	FDP	404,145	8.55%	0	7	7
Communist Party of Germany	KPD	195,852	4.14%	0	0	0
Independents	Ind	3,396	0.07%	0	0	0
Valid votes		4,727,623	100.00%	47	31	78
Rejected votes		123,953	2.55%			
Total polled		4,851,576	81.07%			
Registered electors		5,984,175				

The following candidates were elected:

- State seats - Lisa Albrecht (SPD); Joseph Baumgartner (BP); Valentin Baur (SPD); Thomas Dehler (FDP); Hans Dirscherl (FDP); Anton Donhauser (BP); Hermann Etzel (BP); Ernst Falkner (BP); Hans-Gerd Fröhlich (WAV); Konrad Frühwald (FDP); Günter Goetzendorff (WAV); Franz Höhne (SPD); Waldemar von Knoeringen (SPD); Fritz Linnert (FDP); Hans Löfflad (WAV); Alfred Loritz (WAV); Wilhelm Paschek (WAV); Otto Reindl (WAV); Richard Reitzner (SPD); Wilhelm Schmidt (WAV); Johann Schuster (WAV); Gebhard Seelos (BP); Käte Strobel (SPD); Hans Tichi (WAV); Josef Trischler (FDP); Josef Wallner (WAV); Hans Wellhausen (FDP); Stephan Weickert (WAV); Konrad Wittmann (WAV); Walter Zawadil (FDP); and Franz Ziegler (BP).

Substitutions:

- Fritz Linnert (FDP) died on 27 October 1949 and was replaced by Herta Ilk (FDP) on 3 November 1949.
- Franz Ziegler (BP) died on 27 December 1949 and was replaced by Wilhelm Rahn (BP) on 14 January 1950.
- Ernst Falkner (BP) died on 27 October 1950 and was replaced by Roman Lampl (BP) on 10 November 1950.
- Joseph Baumgartner (BP) resigned on 1 January 1951 and was replaced by Eugen Fürst zu Oettingen-Wallerstein (BP) on 8 January 1951.
- Waldemar von Knoeringen (SPD) resigned on 3 April 1951 and was replaced by Gerhard Kreyssig (SPD) on 4 April 1951.
- Gebhard Seelos (BP) resigned on 25 September 1951 and was replaced by Franz Xaver Meitinger (BP) on 26 September 1951.
- Stephan Weickert (WAV) died on 16 March 1952 and was replaced by Anna Maria Bieganowski (WAV) on 21 March 1952.
- Wilhelm Paschek (WAV) died on 22 April 1952 and was replaced by Wilfried Keller (WAV) on 24 April 1952.
- Eugen Fürst zu Oettingen-Wallerstein (BP) resigned on 1 September 1952 and was replaced by Heinrich Maerkl (BP) on the same day.
