= Rainer Gross (politician) =

German politician (born 1960)

Member of the Bundestag
- Incumbent
- Assumed office 25 March 2025
- Constituency: Bavaria

Personal details
- Born: 9 August 1960 (age 65)
- Party: Alternative for Germany (since 2014)

Karl Rudolf Rainer Gross (born 9 August 1960) is a German politician who was elected as a member of the Bundestag in 2025. He has been a member of the Alternative for Germany since 2014.
