= Raimond Scheirich =

German politician (born 1990)

Member of the Bundestag
- Incumbent
- Assumed office March 2025
- Constituency: Bavaria

Personal details
- Born: 21 March 1990 (age 36) Timișoara, Romania
- Party: Alternative for Germany

Raimond Christian Scheirich (born 21 March 1990) is a German politician who was elected as a member of the Bundestag in 2025. He has served as chairman of the Alternative for Germany in the city council of Augsburg since 2023.
