= Tobias Teich =

German politician (born 1984)

Member of the Bundestag
- Incumbent
- Assumed office TBD
- Constituency: Bavaria

Personal details
- Born: 6 January 1984 (age 42)
- Party: Alternative for Germany (since 2013)

Tobias Daniel Teich (born 6 January 1984) is a German politician who was elected as a member of the Bundestag in 2025. He is a deputy chairman of the Alternative for Germany in Bavaria.
