= Reinhard Mixl =

German politician (born 1961)

Member of the Bundestag
- Incumbent
- Assumed office 25 March 2025
- Constituency: Bavaria

Personal details
- Born: 11 January 1961 (age 65)
- Party: Alternative for Germany (since 2017)

Reinhard Wilhelm Mixl (born 11 January 1961) is a German politician who was elected as a member of the Bundestag in 2025. He has been a member of the Alternative for Germany since 2017.
