= Rebecca Lenhard =

German politician

Member of the Bundestag
- Constituency: Bavaria
- Incumbent
- Assumed office 2025

Personal details
- Party: Alliance 90/The Greens

Rebecca Lenhard is a German politician belonging to the Alliance 90/The Greens. In the 2025 German federal election, she was elected to the German Bundestag.
