= Agnes Conrad (politician) =

German politician (born 1997)

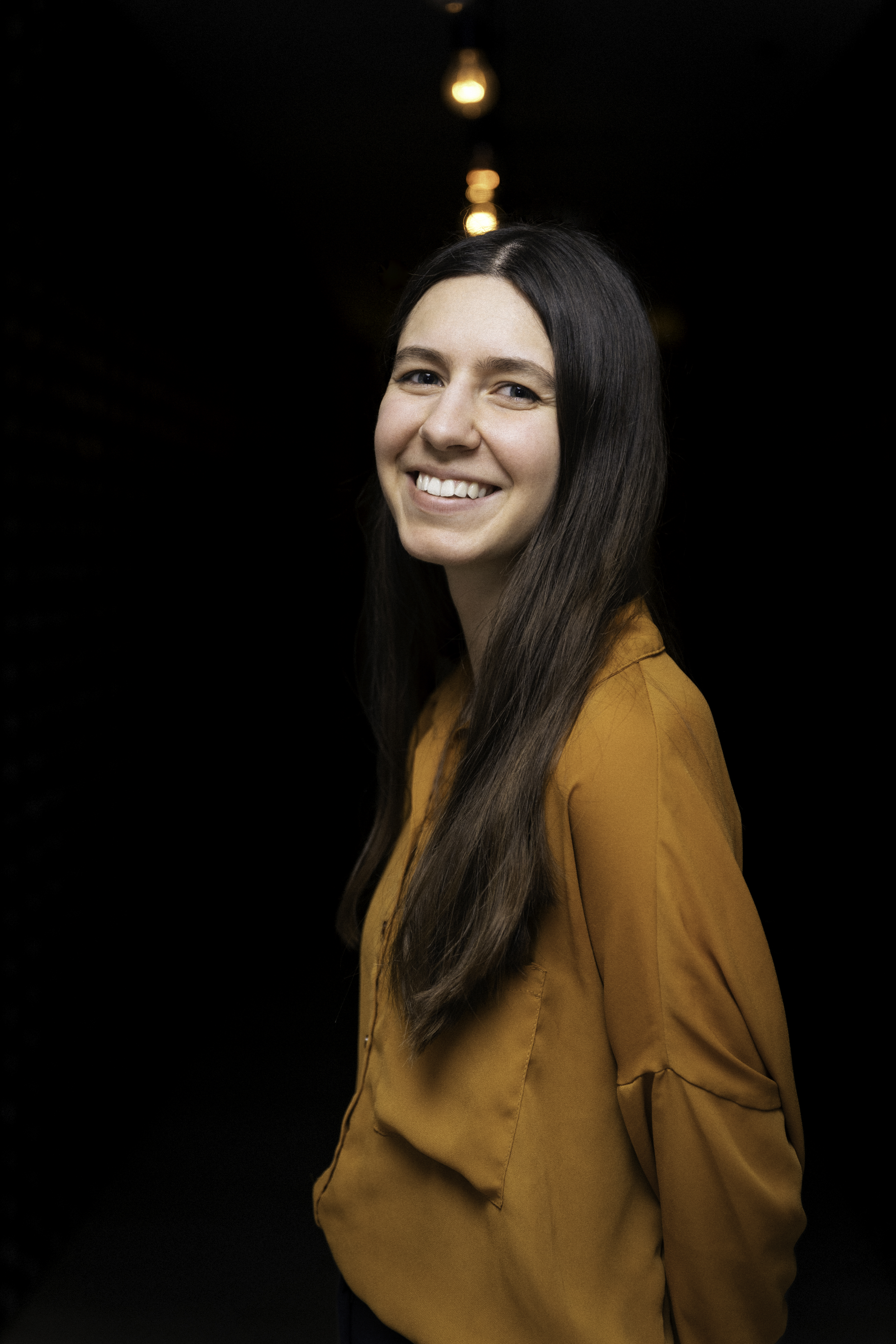
- Conrad in 2025

Member of the Bundestag
- Incumbent
- Assumed office 2025
- Constituency: Bavaria

Personal details
- Born: 29 October 1997 (age 28) Berlin
- Party: The Left

Agnes Conrad (born October 29, 1997 in Berlin) is a German politician belonging to the Left Party. In the 2025 German federal election, she was elected to the German Bundestag.
