= Luke Hoß =

German politician (born 2001)

Member of the Bundestag
- Incumbent
- Assumed office 25. March 2025
- Constituency: Bavaria

Personal details
- Born: 3 September 2001 (age 24)
- Party: The Left (since 2023)

Luke Rolf Hoß (born 3 September 2001) is a German politician who was elected as a member of the Bundestag in 2025. He is the youngest member of the 21st Bundestag. He has served as chairman of The Left in Passau since 2024.
