= Bernd Schuhmann =

German politician (born 1964)

Member of the Bundestag
- Incumbent
- Assumed office 25 March 2025
- Constituency: Bavaria

Personal details
- Born: 20 July 1964 (age 61)
- Party: Alternative for Germany

Bernd Willi Karl Schuhmann (born 20 July 1964) is a German politician who was elected as a member of the Bundestag in 2025. He is the chairman of the Alternative for Germany in Schweinfurt-Land and the district council of Lower Franconia.
