= Carina Schießl =

German politician (born 1990)

Member of the Bundestag
- Incumbent
- Assumed office TBD
- Constituency: Bavaria

Personal details
- Born: 19 February 1990 (age 36)
- Party: Alternative for Germany

Carina Schießl (born 19 February 1990) is a German politician who was elected as a member of the Bundestag in 2025. She previously worked at the University Hospital Regensburg and served as chief of staff to Dieter Arnold.
