= Lukas Rehm =

German politician (born 1990)

Member of the Bundestag
- Incumbent
- Assumed office March 2025
- Constituency: Bavaria

Personal details
- Born: 5 February 1990 (age 36)
- Party: Alternative for Germany (since 2015)

Lukas Rehm (born 5 February 1990) is a German politician who was elected as a member of the Bundestag in 2025. He has served as chairman of the Alternative for Germany in Ingolstadt-Eichstätt since 2019.
