= Erhard Brucker =

German politician (born 1972)

Member of the Bundestag
- Incumbent
- Assumed office 25 March 2025
- Constituency: Bavaria

Personal details
- Born: 28 October 1972 (age 53) Mainburg
- Party: Alternative for Germany

Erhard Josef Brucker (born 28 October 1972 in Mainburg) is a German politician who was elected as a member of the Bundestag in 2025. He has served as city councillor of Regensburg since 2020.
