= Christoph Birghan =

German politician (born 1970)

Member of the Bundestag
- Incumbent
- Assumed office 2025
- Constituency: Bavaria

Personal details
- Born: 23 June 1970 (age 55) Berlin
- Party: Alternative for Germany
- Website: https://www.christoph-birghan.de/

Christoph Birghan (born 23 June 1970 in Berlin) is a German politician from the Alternative for Germany (AfD). He has been a member of the German Bundestag since the 2025 German federal election.

Birghan was AfD district chairman in Steinhöring. In the 2025 federal election he was the direct candidate in Traunstein. He was elected to the Bundestag on the state list.

== See also ==
- List of members of the 21st Bundestag
