= Bastian Treuheit =

German politician (born 1998)

Member of the Bundestag
- Incumbent
- Assumed office March 2025
- Constituency: Bavaria

Personal details
- Born: 17 January 1998 (age 28) Fürth
- Party: Alternative for Germany (since 2016)

Bastian Treuheit (born 17 January 1998 in Fürth) is a German politician who was elected as a member of the Bundestag in 2025. He has been a member of the district council of Fürth and the city council of Zirndorf since 2020.
