= Karl Geldner (politician) =

German politician (1927–2017)

Member of the Bundestag
- In office 19 October 1965 – 19 October 1969
- Incumbent
- Assumed office 26 January 1970

Personal details
- Born: 6 July 1927 Schillingsfürst
- Died: 7 January 2017 (aged 89)
- Party: FDP

Karl Geldner (6 July 1927 – 7 January 2017) was a German politician of the Free Democratic Party (FDP) and former member of the German Bundestag.

== Life ==
He was a member of the German Bundestag from the 1965 to 1969 federal elections and from 26 January 1970, when he succeeded the late Albrecht Haas, until 1976. He had entered the parliament via the state list of the FDP Bavaria.

== Literature ==
Herbst, Ludolf; Jahn, Bruno (2002). Vierhaus, Rudolf (ed.). Biographisches Handbuch der Mitglieder des Deutschen Bundestages. 1949–2002 [Biographical Handbook of the Members of the German Bundestag. 1949–2002] (in German). München: De Gruyter - De Gruyter Saur. p. 1715. ISBN 978-3-11-184511-1.
