= Josef Grünbeck =

German politician (1925–2012)

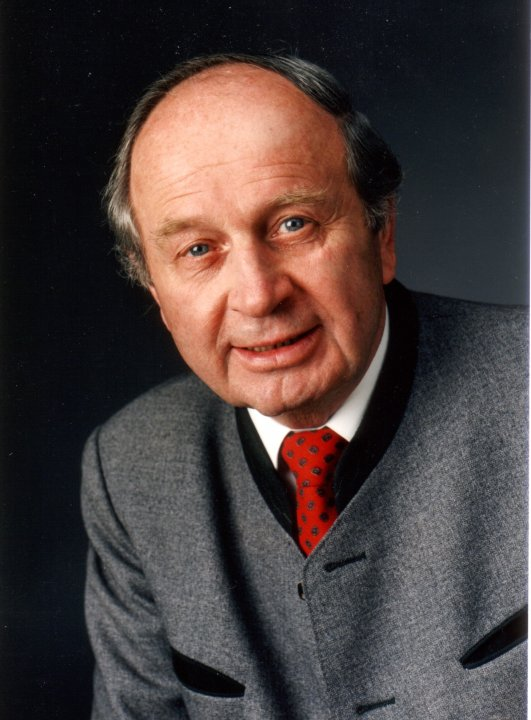
- Josef Grünbeck

Member of the Bundestag
- In office 29 March 1983 – 10 November 1994

Personal details
- Born: 17 September 1925 Haan
- Died: 15 October 2012 (aged 87)
- Party: FDP

Josef Grünbeck (17 September 1925 – 15 October 2012) was a German politician of the Free Democratic Party (FDP) and former member of the German Bundestag.

== Life ==
1978 to 1982 and in 1990/91 member of the Bavarian State Parliament and in 1990/91 Chairman of the FDP parliamentary group. He was a member of the Bundestag from 1983 to 1994.

== Literature ==
Herbst, Ludolf; Jahn, Bruno (2002). Vierhaus, Rudolf (ed.). Biographisches Handbuch der Mitglieder des Deutschen Bundestages. 1949–2002 [Biographical Handbook of the Members of the German Bundestag. 1949–2002] (in German). München: De Gruyter - De Gruyter Saur. p. 1715. ISBN 978-3-11-184511-1.
