= Klaus Barthel =

German politician of the SPD

Klaus Barthel (born 28 December 1955 in Munich) is a German politician of the SPD who served as a member of the Bundestag from 1994 until 2017.
