= Hannelore Roedel =

German politician

- Born: 3 July 1957 (age 68); Nuremberg, Bavaria, Germany
- Occupation: Politician
- Political party: Christian Social Union of Bavaria

Hannelore Roedel (born 3 July 1957) is a German politician from the Christian Social Union of Bavaria. She was a member of the German Bundestag from 2002 and 2005.
