= Paul Podolay =

German politician

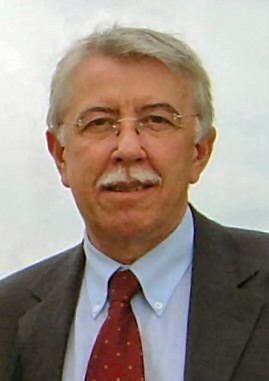
- Paul Podolay in 2007

Member of the Bundestag
- Incumbent
- Assumed office 2017

Personal details
- Born: 30 May 1946 (age 79) Bratislava
- Party: AfD

Paul Podolay (born 30 May 1946) is a German politician. Born in Bratislava, he represents Alternative for Germany (AfD). Paul Podolay has served as a member of the Bundestag from the state of Bavaria since 2017.

== Life ==
He became member of the Bundestag after the 2017 German federal election. He is a member of the Committee on Health and Foreign Affairs.
