= Horst Friedrich =

German politician

Member of the Bundestag
- In office 20 December 1990 – 27 October 2009

Personal details
- Born: 12 October 1950 (age 75) Bayreuth
- Party: FDP

Horst Friedrich (born 12 October 1950) was a German politician of the Free Democratic Party (FDP) and former member of the German Bundestag.

== Life ==
Horst Friedrich was a member of the German Bundestag from 1990 to 2009. Horst Friedrich always entered the Bundestag via the Landesliste Bayern. His constituency was Bayreuth.

== Literature ==
Herbst, Ludolf; Jahn, Bruno (2002). Vierhaus, Rudolf (ed.). Biographisches Handbuch der Mitglieder des Deutschen Bundestages. 1949–2002 [Biographical Handbook of the Members of the German Bundestag. 1949–2002] (in German). München: De Gruyter - De Gruyter Saur. p. 1715. ISBN 978-3-11-184511-1.
