= Valentin Baur =

German politician (1891–1971)

Member of the Bundestag
- In office 7 September 1949 – 15 October 1961

Personal details
- Born: 19 December 1891 Augsburg
- Died: 25 June 1971 (aged 79)
- Party: SPD

Valentin Baur (19 December 1891 – 25 June 1971) was a German politician of the Social Democratic Party (SPD) and member of the German Bundestag.

== Life ==
Baur had been a member of the SPD since 1911. In 1946 he became district chairman of his party in Swabia and was a member of the party executive committee from 1946 to 1949.

From December 1946 to June 1947, Baur was a member of the state parliament in Bavaria. From 1947 to 1949 Baur was a member of the Economic Council. From 1949 to 1961 he was a member of the German Bundestag. He represented the Augsburg constituency in the Bundestag.

== Literature ==
Herbst, Ludolf; Jahn, Bruno (2002). Vierhaus, Rudolf (ed.). Biographisches Handbuch der Mitglieder des Deutschen Bundestages. 1949–2002 [Biographical Handbook of the Members of the German Bundestag. 1949–2002] (in German). München: De Gruyter - De Gruyter Saur. p. 1715. ISBN 978-3-11-184511-1.
