= Herbert Christ =

German politician

Member of the Bundestag
- In office 13 December 1972 – 13 December 1976

Personal details
- Born: 20 January 1941 (age 85) Nürnberg
- Party: FDP

Herbert Christ (20 January 1941) was a German politician of the Free Democratic Party (FDP) and former member of the German Bundestag.

== Life ==
He was a member of the German Bundestag for one legislative period from 13 December 1972. He was elected via the state list of the FDP in Bavaria. In the Bundestag he was a full member of the committee for youth, family and health until September 1974. From September 1974 he became a member of the Committee for Economics.

== Literature ==
Herbst, Ludolf; Jahn, Bruno (2002). Vierhaus, Rudolf (ed.). Biographisches Handbuch der Mitglieder des Deutschen Bundestages. 1949–2002 [Biographical Handbook of the Members of the German Bundestag. 1949–2002] (in German). München: De Gruyter - De Gruyter Saur. p. 1715. ISBN 978-3-11-184511-1.
