= Herta Ilk =

German politician (1902–1972)

Herta Ilse Käte Ilk (9 September 1902 in Brieg/Silesia – 29 August 1972 in Augsburg) was a German FDP politician.

== Life ==
Herta Ilk studied law and political science at the University of Wroclaw after graduating from high school in Beuthen. After her studies she was a housewife and gave legal advice on a voluntary basis. In 1939 she moved from Breslau to Augsburg, where Ilk worked as a legal advisor at the Dresdner Bank. After the war she worked as a lawyer in Augsburg.

== Politics ==
After being a member of the German Democratic Party (DDP) from 1919 to 1933, Herta Ilk joined the FDP in 1947, was a member of the state executive of the FDP in Bavaria from 1948 to 1953 and a member of the federal executive of the FDP from 1950 to 1964.

From 3 November 1949, when she succeeded the late Fritz Linnert, until 1957 Herta Ilk was a member of the German Bundestag. Herta Ilk was the first female lawyer in the Bundestag. Afterwards she was a city councillor in Augsburg from 1960 to 1970. In 1961 she was founder and member of the first board of the Society for Freedom - Friends and Sponsors of the Friedrich Naumann Foundation.

A partial estate with documents about her activities for the FDP in the Bavarian state executive committee as well as in the German Bundestag are in the Archive of Liberalism of the Friedrich Naumann Foundation for Freedom in Gummersbach.

== Honours ==
- Cross of Merit 1st Class of the Federal Republic of Germany (1968)

== Literature ==
- Rudolf Vierhaus, Ludolf Herbst (Hrsg.), Bruno Jahn (Mitarb.): Biographisches Handbuch der Mitglieder des Deutschen Bundestages. 1949–2002. Bd. 1: A–M. K. G. Saur, München 2002, ISBN 3-598-23782-0, S. 375.
