= Lisa Albrecht =

German politician (1896–1958)

Member of the Bundestag
- In office 7 September 1949 – 16 May 1958

Personal details
- Born: 27 May 1896 Hamburg
- Died: 16 May 1958 (aged 61) Berlin, Germany
- Party: SPD

Lisa Albrecht (27 May 1896 – 16 May 1958) was a German politician of the Social Democratic Party (SPD) and former member of the German Bundestag.

== Life ==
Albrecht had been a member of the SPD since 1914. In 1946/47, she was state chairwoman of the SPD in Bavaria, then deputy state chairwoman until her death. From 1947 until her death Albrecht was a member of the federal executive committee of the SPD. Lisa Albrecht was a member of the German Bundestag from the first federal election in 1949 until her death.

== Literature ==
Herbst, Ludolf; Jahn, Bruno (2002). Vierhaus, Rudolf (ed.). Biographisches Handbuch der Mitglieder des Deutschen Bundestages. 1949–2002 [Biographical Handbook of the Members of the German Bundestag. 1949–2002] (in German). München: De Gruyter - De Gruyter Saur. p. 1715. ISBN 978-3-11-184511-1.
