= Ingeborg Geisendörfer =

German politician (1907–2006)

Member of the Bundestag
- In office 6 October 1953 – 22 September 1972

Personal details
- Born: 30 May 1907 Dillingen an der Donau
- Died: 25 June 2006 (aged 99)
- Party: CSU

Ingeborg Geisendörfer (30 May 1907 – 25 June 2006) was a German politician of the Christian Social Union in Bavaria (CSU) and former member of the German Bundestag.

== Life ==
Ingeborg Geisendörfer was a member of the German Bundestag from 1953 to 1972.

== Literature ==
Herbst, Ludolf; Jahn, Bruno (2002). Vierhaus, Rudolf (ed.). Biographisches Handbuch der Mitglieder des Deutschen Bundestages. 1949–2002 [Biographical Handbook of the Members of the German Bundestag. 1949–2002] (in German). München: De Gruyter - De Gruyter Saur. p. 1715. ISBN 978-3-11-184511-1.
