= Hans Dirscherl =

German politician (1889–1962)

Member of the Bundestag
- In office 7 September 1949 – 7 September 1953

Personal details
- Born: 4 March 1889 Kössing
- Died: 16 April 1962 (aged 73)
- Party: FDP

Hans Dirscherl (4 March 1889 – 16 April 1962) was a German politician of the Free Democratic Party (FDP) and former member of the German Bundestag.

== Life ==
After the Second World War, Dirscherl joined the FDP in 1949. From 1947 to 1955, he was a member of the Bavarian Senate as a representative of the craft trades. He was a member of the German Bundestag in the first legislative period (1949-1953).

== Literature ==
Herbst, Ludolf; Jahn, Bruno (2002). Vierhaus, Rudolf (ed.). Biographisches Handbuch der Mitglieder des Deutschen Bundestages. 1949–2002 [Biographical Handbook of the Members of the German Bundestag. 1949–2002] (in German). München: De Gruyter - De Gruyter Saur. p. 1715. ISBN 978-3-11-184511-1.
