= Uta Titze-Stecher =

German politician (1942–2024)

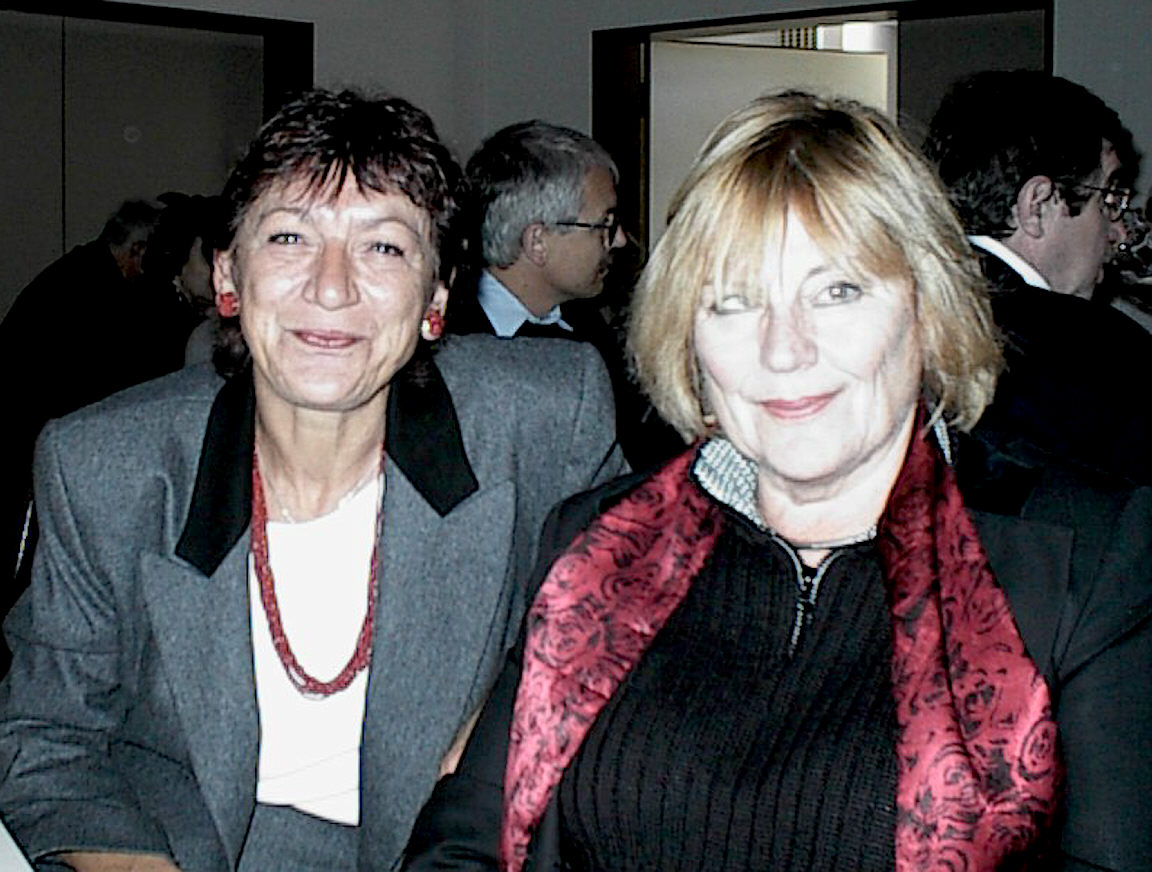
- Titze-Stecher (right) with Rosemarie Grützner

Member of the Bundestag
- In office 20 December 1990 – 17 October 2002

Personal details
- Born: Uta Weber; 28 December 1942 Posen, Reichsgau Wartheland, Germany (now Poznań, Poland)
- Died: 13 May 2024 (aged 81) Germering, Bavaria, Germany
- Party: SPD
- Occupation: Schoolteacher

Uta Titze-Stecher (née Weber; 28 December 1942 – 13 May 2024) was a German politician. A member of the Social Democratic Party, she served in the Bundestag from 1990 to 2002.

Titze-Stecher died in Germering on 13 May 2024, at the age of 81.
