= Fritz Schösser =

German politician (1947–2019)

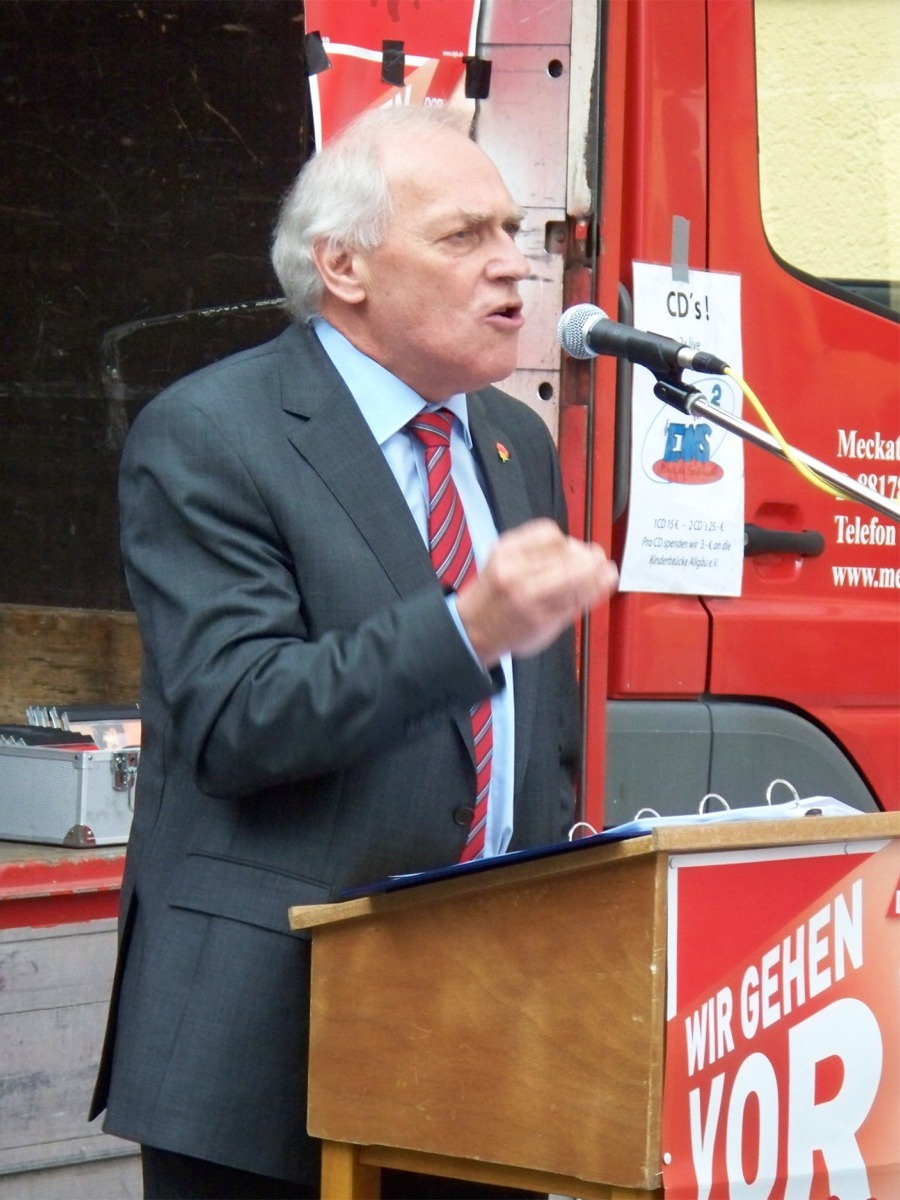
Schösser in May 2010

Fritz Schösser (24 June 1947 – 28 May 2019) was a German politician for the Social Democratic Party (SPD). He was the chairman of the Trade Union Confederation (DGB) in Bavaria from 1990 to 2010. From 1992 to 1994, he was a member of the Bavarian Senate, after which he became a member of the Landtag of Bavaria. In 1998, Schösser was elected to the national Bundestag, serving until 2005.

Born in Töging am Inn, Schösser was married and had two children. He died on 28 May 2019 in Munich, at the age of 71.
