= Konrad Frühwald (politician, born 1890) =

German politician

Member of the Bundestag
- In office 7 September 1949 – 6 October 1957

Personal details
- Born: 5 June 1890 Roßbach
- Died: 19 April 1970 (aged 79)
- Party: FDP

Konrad Frühwald (5 June 1890 – 19 April 1970) was a German politician of the Free Democratic Party (FDP) and former member of the German Bundestag.

== Life ==
Frühwald was a member of the Landtag of Bavaria from 1928 to 1933.

In 1947 he became a member of the Bavarian Senate and belonged to it until 1969. He was a member of the German Bundestag from 1949 to 1957, and from 1953 he was spokesman for agricultural policy for the FDP parliamentary group.

== Literature ==
Herbst, Ludolf; Jahn, Bruno (2002). Vierhaus, Rudolf (ed.). Biographisches Handbuch der Mitglieder des Deutschen Bundestages. 1949–2002 [Biographical Handbook of the Members of the German Bundestag. 1949–2002] (in German). München: De Gruyter - De Gruyter Saur. p. 1715. ISBN 978-3-11-184511-1.
