= 21st Bundestag =

←	20th
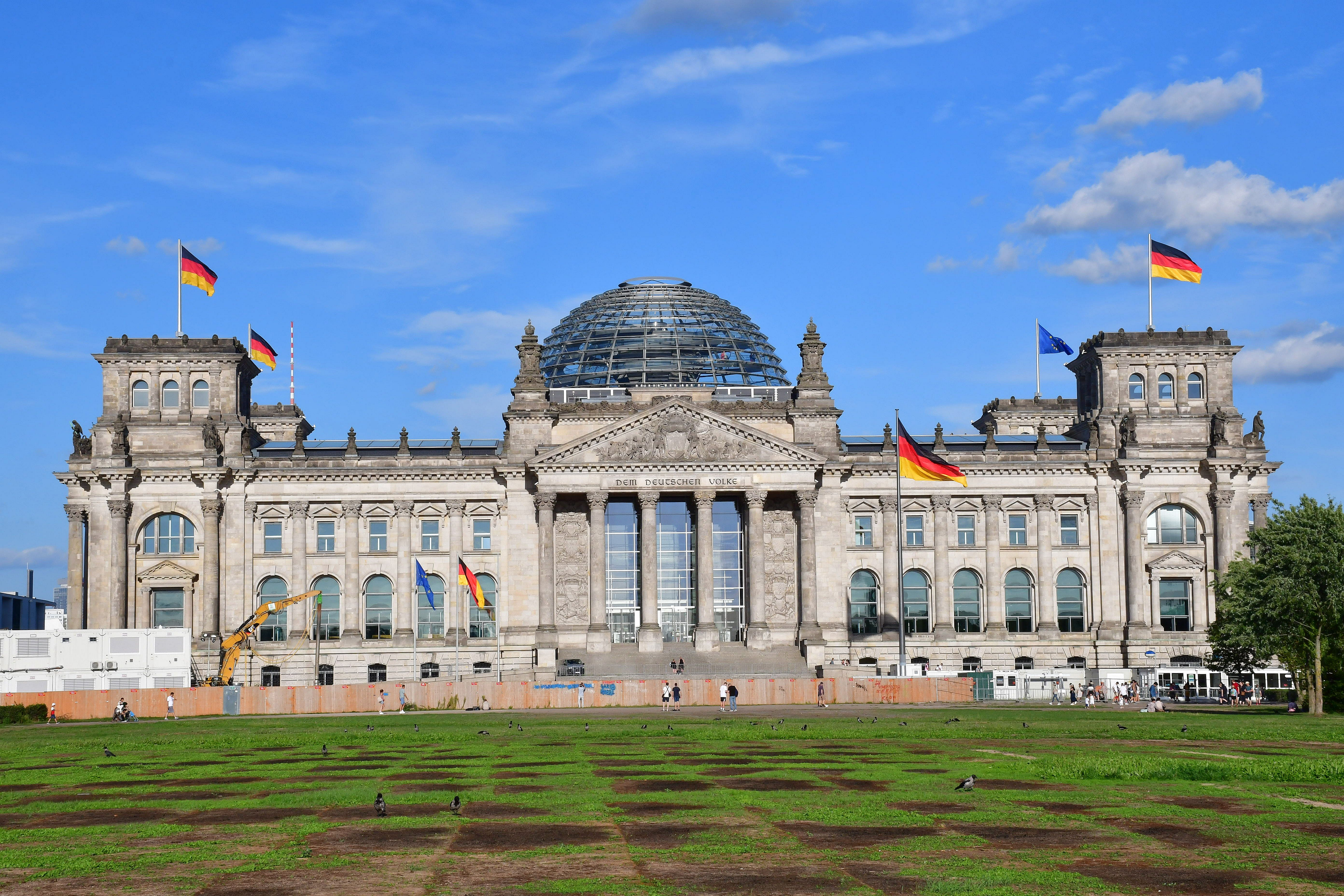
- Reichstag building in 2024

Overview
- Legislative body: Bundestag
- Jurisdiction: Germany
- Meeting place: Reichstag building, Berlin
- Term: 25 March 2025 –
- Election: 23 February 2025

Bundestag
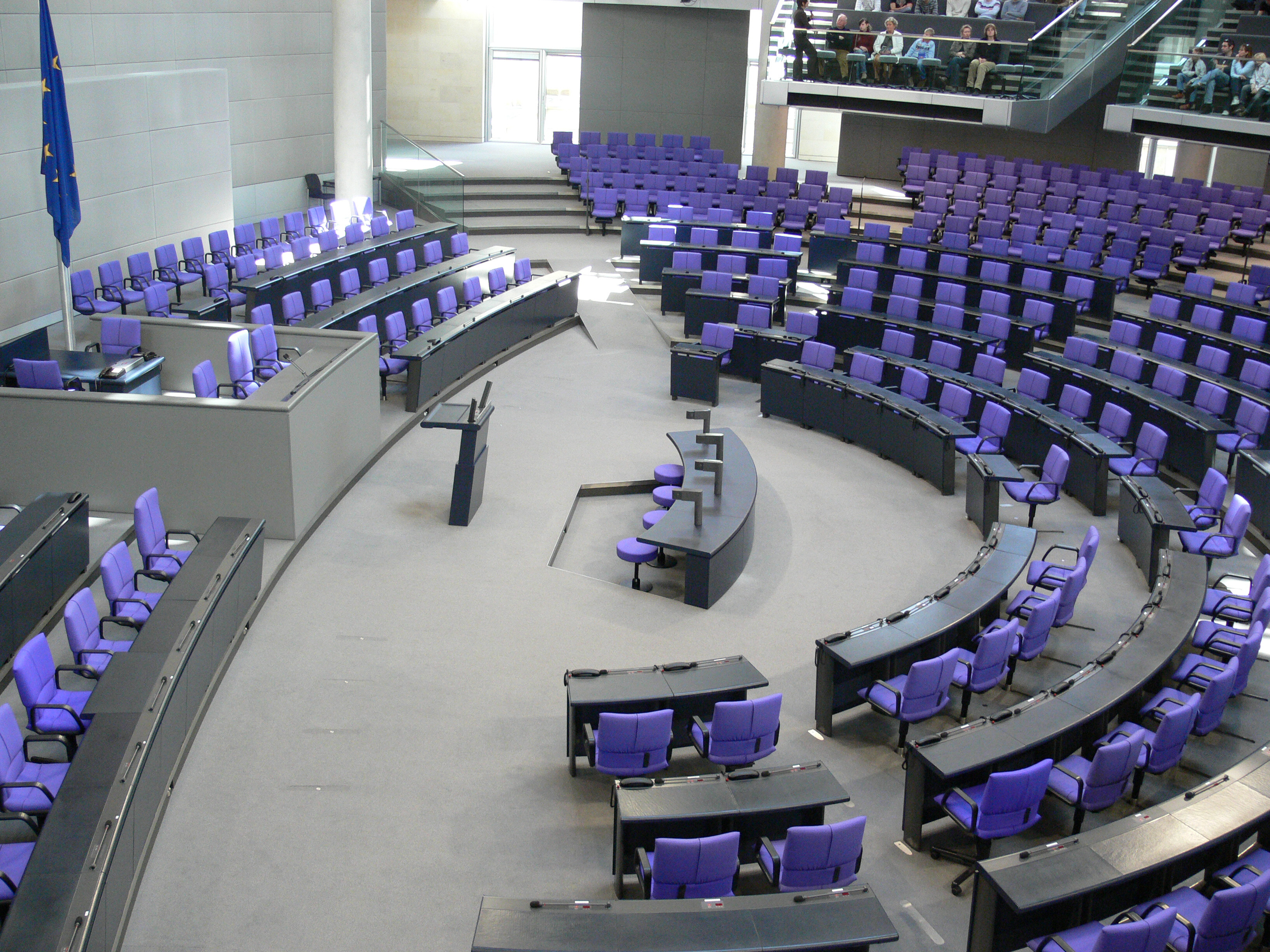
- Members: 630
- President: Julia Klöckner (CDU/CSU)

The 21st Bundestag, the federal parliament of Germany, was elected in the 23 February 2025 federal election. It was constituted on the last possible date, 25 March, with the old parliament changing the constitution in between.

The President of the Bundestag is Julia Klöckner (CDU). Each party's respective faction is supposed to be represented by one Vice-President, in most cases a formality. Since the AfD joined the Bundestag for the first time in 2017, no AfD candidate has ever been approved in dozens of attempts, due to the "firewall" policy of all other parties.

The 21st Bundestag is the first to have the fixed number of 630 members, 103 seats smaller than the 20th Bundestag, with 733 members resulting from former proportional regulations. It started with 208 members of the CDU/CSU (Union), 152 members of the Alternative for Germany (AfD), 120 members of the Social Democratic Party of Germany (SPD), 85 members of Alliance 90/The Greens (Grüne), 64 members of The Left (Linke), and one member of the Danish regional minority South Schleswig Voters' Association (SSW).

One AfD parliamentarian (Sieghard Knodel) left his party and its faction after on 2 May 2025 the Federal Office for the Protection of the Constitution, (BfV) Germany's federal domestic intelligence agency, had classified the AfD as a "confirmed right-wing extremist" organisation. This classification was temporarily suspended by the BfV just a week after its announcement.

On 6 May 2025 Friedrich Merz (CDU) was elected as Chancellor of Germany and sworn in alongside his cabinet. Merz failed to garner the required absolute majority of parliamentary votes in a first round of voting – a first in German history for a chancellor candidate.

== Presidium ==
According to Bundestag parliamentary rules of procedure, each faction is entitled to one Vice-President, with each faction candidate usually approved on first ballot. This has not been applied yet to any AfD candidate, even though a few already had served as state parliament Vice-Presidents. As of October 2025, the AfD had put forward three candidates during a total of five ballot occasions during 21st Bundestag sessions, all of which have failed to reach the required majority, usually winning only a few dozens votes from other factions. Since the party joined the Bundestag in 2017, none of dozens of AfD candidates has ever been approved.

President		Party	Ballot	Term
President	Julia Klöckner	CDU	382 / 622	25 Mar. 2025 – present
Vice-President	Andrea Lindholz	CSU	425 / 613	25 Mar. 2025 – present
Vice-President	Vacant	AfD	Ballots: 185 / 613; 190 / 605; 184 / 603; 156 / 588; 153 / 579	N/A
Vice-President	Josephine Ortleb	SPD	434 / 613	25 Mar. 2025 – present
Vice-President	Omid Nouripour	GRÜNE	432 / 613	25 Mar. 2025 – present
Vice-President	Bodo Ramelow	LINKE	318 / 613	25 Mar. 2025 – present
Source: Bundestag

== Parliamentary groups ==
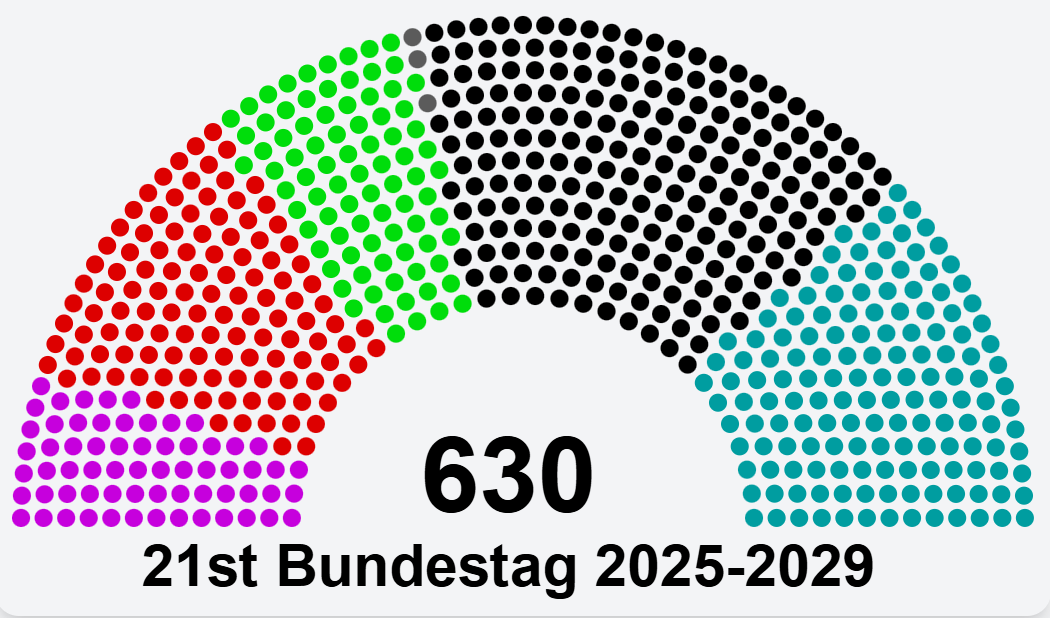

Group	Members		Chairperson(s)	
Group	At election	Current	Chairperson(s)	
CDU/CSU	208 / 630	208 / 630	Friedrich Merz; Jens Spahn	15 Feb. 2022 – 5 May 2025; 5 May 2025 – 18 July 2026
Alternative for Germany (AfD)	152 / 630	150 / 630	Alice Weidel; Tino Chrupalla	26 Oct. 2021 – present 26 Oct. 2021 – present
Social Democratic Party of Germany (SPD)	120 / 630	120 / 630	Lars Klingbeil; Matthias Miersch	26 Feb. 2025 – 6 May 2025; 7 May 2025 – present
Alliance 90/The Greens (Grüne)	85 / 630	85 / 630	Katharina Dröge; Britta Haßelmann	7 Dec. 2021 – present 7 Dec. 2021 – present
The Left (Linke)	64 / 630	64 / 630	Heidi Reichinnek; Sören Pellmann	19 Feb. 2024 – present 19 Feb. 2024 – present
Non-attached members	1 / 630	3 / 630		
Source: Bundestag

== List of current members ==
This is the list of members elected in the 2025 election according to preliminary results.

Image	Name	Date of birth	Party	State	Constituency	Ran in	Vote %	List #	Member since	Notes	Ref.
	Sanae Abdi	7 July 1986	SPD	North Rhine-Westphalia	Cologne I (092)	092	24.9%	8	2021		
	Knut Abraham	4 June 1966	CDU	Brandenburg		065		2	2021		
	Doris Achelwilm	30 November 1976	Linke	Bremen		054		1	2017–2021, 2025		
	Anna Aeikens	15 August 1998	CDU	Saxony-Anhalt		067		3	2025		
	Adis Ahmetovic	27 July 1993	SPD	Lower Saxony	Stadt Hannover I (041)	041	34.1%	25	2021		
	Gökay Akbulut	16 November 1982	Linke	Baden-Württemberg		275		3	2017		
	Jan van Aken	1 May 1961	Linke	Hamburg				1	2009–2017, 2025		
	Tarek Al-Wazir	3 January 1971	Grüne	Hesse		184		4	2025		
	Reem Alabali-Radovan	1 May 1990	SPD	Mecklenburg-Vorpommern		012		1	2021		
	Stephan Albani	3 June 1968	CDU	Lower Saxony		027		11	2013		
	Alaa Alhamwi	17 April 1984	Grüne	Lower Saxony		027		8	2025		
	Norbert Altenkamp	27 July 1972	CDU	Hesse	Main-Taunus (180)	180	39.8%	11	2017		
	Philipp Amthor	10 November 1992	CDU	Mecklenburg-Vorpommern		016		1	2017		
	Luise Amtsberg	17 October 1984	Grüne	Schleswig-Holstein	Kiel (005)	005	26.0%	1	2013		
	Moses Arndt	18 March 1964	Linke	Saarland		299		1	2025		
	Alexander Arpaschi	24 May 1970	AfD	Baden-Württemberg		273		11	2025		
	Ayse Asar	19 December 1975	Grüne	Hesse		177		7	2025		
	Reza Asghari	1 April 1961	CDU	Lower Saxony	Salzgitter – Wolfenbüttel	049	28.3%		2025		
	Andreas Audretsch	25 June 1984	Grüne	Berlin		081		2	2021		
	Artur Auernhammer	9 March 1963	CSU	Bavaria	Ansbach (240)	240	41.8%		2004–2005, 2013		
	Peter Aumer	17 April 1976	CSU	Bavaria	Regensburg (232)	232	38.3%		2009–2013, 2017		
	Cornell Babendererde	1 March 1971	CDU	Lower Saxony	Harburg (036)	036	33.2%	13	2025		
	Carolin Bachmann	3 September 1988	AfD	Saxony	Mittelsachsen (160)	160	45.4%	3	2021		
	Lisa Badum	2 October 1983	Grüne	Bavaria		235		5	2017		
	Dorothee Bär	19 April 1978	CSU	Bavaria	Bad Kissingen (247)	247	50.5%	6	2002		
	Karl Bär	13 March 1985	Grüne	Bavaria		222		6	2021		
	Daniel Baldy	25 September 1994	SPD	Rhineland-Palatinate		204		4	2021		
	Adam Balten	9 November 1983	AfD	North Rhine-Westphalia		112		23	2025		
	Felix Banaszak	24 October 1989	Grüne	North Rhine-Westphalia		115		6	2021		
	Thomas Bareiß	15 February 1975	CDU	Baden-Württemberg	Zollernalb – Sigmaringen (295)	295	37.1%		2005		
	Sören Bartol	4 September 1974	SPD	Hesse	Marburg (170)	170	30.3%	5	2002		
	Dietmar Bartsch	31 March 1958	Linke	Mecklenburg-Vorpommern		014		1	1998–2002, 2005	Faction co-leader (to Oct 2023) then leader (Oct–Dec 2023); Group co-leader (from Feb 2024)	
	Bärbel Bas	3 May 1968	SPD	North Rhine-Westphalia	Duisburg I (114)	114	39.0%	6	2009	President of the Bundestag	
	Marcel Bauer	30 April 1992	Linke	Baden-Württemberg		271		6	2025		
	Christina Baum	21 March 1956	AfD	Saxony-Anhalt	Harz (068)	068			2021		
	Bernd Baumann	31 January 1958	AfD	Hamburg		019		1	2017		
	Günter Baumgartner	24 April 1975	CSU	Bavaria	Rottal-Inn (229)	229	34.9%	17	2025		
	Katharina Beck	13 April 1982	Grüne	Hamburg		021		1	2021		
	Desiree Becker	27 January 1994	Linke	Hesse		172			2025		
	Carsten Becker	20 January 1990	AfD	Saarland		297			2025		
	Sascha van Beek	16 June 1983	CDU			112	34.8%		2025		
	Jens Behrens	12 June 1978	SPD			145			2025		
	Lukas Benner	20 February 1996	Grüne	North Rhine-Westphalia		086		14	2021		
	Marc Bernhard	5 February 1972	AfD	Baden-Württemberg		271		4	2017		
	Melanie Bernstein	28 September 1976	CDU	Lower Saxony	008	008	32.3%	4	2017–2021, 2023		
	Birgit Bessin	26 March 1978	AfD	Brandenburg	Elbe-Elster – Oberspreewald-Lausitz	065	43.0%		2025		
	Daniel Bettermann	17 October 1980	SPD			167	27.7%				
	Lorenz Gösta Beutin	18 July 1978	Linke	Schleswig-Holstein		001					
	Peter Beyer	25 December 1970	CDU	North Rhine-Westphalia	Mettmann II (104)	104	35.9%	32	2009		
	Marc Biadacz	3 September 1979	CDU	Baden-Württemberg	Böblingen (260)	260	37.3%		2017		
	Steffen Bilger	16 February 1979	CDU	Baden-Württemberg	Ludwigsburg (265)	265	36.5%		2009		
	Florian Bilic	10 January 1994	CDU			209	33.3%				
	Christoph Birghan	1970	AfD			224					
	Jakob Blankenburg	5 August 1997	SPD	Lower Saxony	Lüchow-Dannenberg – Lüneburg (037)	037	27.8%	13	2021		
	Andreas Bleck	17 April 1988	AfD	Rhineland-Palatinate		196		3	2017		
	Joachim Bloch	1963	AfD			285					
	Michael Blos	1976	AfD			283					
	René Bochmann	4 February 1969	AfD	Saxony	Nordsachsen (150)	150	43.8%	10	2021		
	Violetta Bock	11 December 1987	Linke	Hesse		167					
	Leif Bodin	20 June 1996	CDU	Schleswig-Holstein	Nordfriesland – Dithmarschen Nord (002)	002	32.7%				
	Peter Boehringer	6 April 1969	AfD	Bavaria		231		2	2017		
	Peter Bohnhof	1962	AfD								
	Gereon Bollmann	20 November 1953	AfD	Schleswig-Holstein		004		2	2021		
	Hendrik Bollmann	10 September 1982	SPD			140	33.5%				
	Simone Borchardt	11 September 1967	CDU	Mecklenburg-Vorpommern		013		2	2021		
	Caroline Bosbach	27 November 1989	CDU	North Rhine-Westphalia	Rheinisch-Bergischer Kreis (099)	099	42.2%				
	Jorrit Bosch	8 September 1997	Linke								
	Janina Böttger	4 April 1982	Linke	Saxony-Anhalt		071					
	Frederik Bouffier	7 October 1990	CDU			172	30.4%				
	Torben Braga	27 August 1991	AfD	Thuringia							
	Michael Brand	19 November 1973	CDU	Hesse	Fulda (173)	173	43.3%	2	2005		
	Dirk Brandes	25 May 1974	AfD	Lower Saxony		043		1	2021		
	Reinhard Brandl	1 August 1977	CSU	Bavaria	Ingolstadt (215)	215	47.1%		2009		
	Stephan Brandner	29 May 1966	AfD	Thuringia	Gera – Greiz – Altenburger Land (193)	193	44.8%	1	2017		
	Franziska Brantner	24 August 1979	Grüne	Baden-Württemberg		274		1	2013		
	Silvia Breher	23 July 1973	CDU	Lower Saxony	Cloppenburg – Vechta (032)	032	45.8%	30	2017		
	Michael Breilmann	10 October 1983	CDU	North Rhine-Westphalia	Recklinghausen I	120	28.8%	18	2021–2025, 2026		
	Anne-Mieke Bremer	31 October 1991	Linke			040					
	Ralph Brinkhaus	15 June 1968	CDU	North Rhine-Westphalia	Gütersloh I (130)	130	41.6%		2009	Faction leader (to Feb 2022)	
	Lutz Brinkmann	27 December 1975	CDU			038	36.6%				
	Carsten Brodesser	5 September 1967	CDU	North Rhine-Westphalia	Oberbergischer Kreis (098)	098	36.9%	34	2017		
	Marlon Bröhr	3 April 1974	CDU	Rhineland-Palatinate	Mosel/Rhein-Hunsrück (199)	199	38.2%	9	2021		
	Victoria Broßart	24 September 1992	Grüne			221					
	Erhard Brucker	28 October 1972	AfD			228					
	Maik Brückner	16 June 1992	Linke			048					
	Agnieszka Brugger	8 February 1985	Grüne	Baden-Württemberg		294		3	2009		
	Benedikt Büdenbender	31 July 1989	CDU			147	34.1%				
	Marcus Bühl	29 April 1977	AfD	Thuringia	Gotha – Ilm-Kreis	191	41.2%		2017		
	Clara Bünger	4 July 1986	Linke	Saxony		159		3	2022		
	Yannick Bury	11 March 1990	CDU	Baden-Württemberg	Emmendingen – Lahr	283	37.0%		2021		
	Isabel Cademartori	9 January 1988	SPD	Baden-Württemberg		275		9	2021		
	Sandra Carstensen	2 October 1971	CDU	Schleswig-Holstein	Plön – Neumünster (006)	006	32.7%	8	2025		
	Lars Castellucci	24 February 1974	SPD	Baden-Württemberg		277		12	2013		
	Jörg Cezanne	8 June 1958	Linke	Hesse		183		2	2017–2021, 2024		
	Tino Chrupalla	14 April 1975	AfD	Saxony	Görlitz (156)	156	48.9%	1	2017	Party co-leader; Faction co-leader	
	Gitta Connemann	10 May 1964	CDU	Lower Saxony	Unterems (025)	025	40.5%	2	2002		
	Agnes Conrad	29 October 1997	Linke			249		7	2025		
	Jürgen Coße	16 August 1969	SPD	North Rhine-Westphalia		127		15	2016–2017, 2021		
	Gottfried Curio	2 September 1960	AfD	Berlin	084	084	29.5%	2	2017		
	Wolfgang Dahler	6 May 1975	CDU		292	292	40.9%		2025		
	Janosch Dahmen	6 September 1981	Grüne	North Rhine-Westphalia		138		18	2020		
	Hakan Demir	16 November 1984	SPD	Berlin		081		3	2021		
	Ellen Demuth	10 July 1982	CDU		196	196	35.6%	10	2025		
	Sandra Detzer	21 April 1980	Grüne	Baden-Württemberg		265		5	2021		
	Jan Dieren	29 July 1991	SPD	North Rhine-Westphalia		113		17	2021		
	Thomas Dietz	12 March 1967	AfD	Saxony	Erzgebirgskreis I (163)	163	46.6%	–	2021		
	Esther Dilcher	18 September 1965	SPD	Hesse		166		6	2017		
	Jeanne Dillschneider	27 December 1995	Grüne	Saarland		296		1	2025		
	Sabine Dittmar	15 September 1964	SPD	Bavaria		247		6	2013		
	Alexander Dobrindt	7 June 1970	CSU	Bavaria	Weilheim (225)	225	45.8%	1	2002		
	Michael Donth	8 June 1967	CDU	Baden-Württemberg	Reutlingen (289)	289	38.5%		2013		
	Felix Döring	23 February 1991	SPD	Hesse		172		5	2021		
	Florian Dorn	24 May 1986	CSU	Bavaria	255	255	43.8%		2025		
	Christian Douglas	1978	AfD	Hesse		180		6	2025		
	Katharina Dröge	14 September 1984	Grüne	North Rhine-Westphalia	094	094	26.0%	2	2013		
	Christopher Drößler	26 September 1995	AfD	Thuringia	188	188	39.5%	6	2025		
	Falko Droßmann	11 December 1973	SPD	Hamburg	Hamburg-Mitte (018)	018	27.4%		2021		
	Hülya Düber	5 July 1978	CSU	Bavaria	250	250	39.1%	26	2025		
	Deborah Düring	18 July 1994	Grüne	Hesse		181		3	2021		
	Hansjörg Durz	29 July 1971	CSU	Bavaria	Augsburg-Land	252	44.5%		2013		
	Timon Dzienus	25 May 1996	Grüne			041					
	Tobias Ebenberger	1990	AfD			096					
	Joachim Ebmeyer	30 January 1985	CDU			132	30.1%				
	Harald Ebner	8 July 1964	Grüne	Baden-Württemberg		268			2011		
	Leon Eckert	9 April 1995	Grüne	Bavaria		213			2021		
	Ralph Edelhäußer	22 March 1973	CSU	Bavaria	Roth	245	42.9%		2021		
	Mirze Edis	1 January 1972	Linke			114					
	Lars Andre Ehm	9 April 1976	CDU			121	31.6%				
	Sonja Eichwede	25 October 1987	SPD	Brandenburg	Brandenburg an der Havel – Potsdam-Mittelmark I – Havelland III – Teltow-Fläming I	060			2021		
	Mandy Eißing	31 August 1976	Linke			194					
	Marcel Emmerich	12 May 1991	Grüne	Baden-Württemberg		291			2021		
	Alexander Engelhard	26 September 1972	CSU	Bavaria	Neu-Ulm	254	42.5%		2021		
	Martina Englhardt-Kopf	8 June 1981	CSU	Bavaria	Schwandorf	233	42.2%		2021		
	Thomas Erndl	22 July 1974	CSU	Bavaria	Deggendorf	226	43.3%		2017		
	Bastian Alfons Ernst	30 January 1987	CDU		028	028	29.3%				
	Wiebke Esdar	11 February 1984	SPD	North Rhine-Westphalia	Bielefeld – Gütersloh II	131	27.2%		2017		
	Saskia Esken	28 August 1961	SPD	Baden-Württemberg		280			2013	Party co-leader	
	Michael Espendiller	5 May 1989	AfD	North Rhine-Westphalia		125			2017		
	Nancy Faeser	13 July 1970	SPD	Hesse		180					
	Fabian Fahl	20 March 1993	Linke			086					
	Hermann Färber	26 March 1963	CDU	Baden-Württemberg	Göppingen	263	37.1%		2013		
	Johannes Fechner	25 November 1972	SPD	Baden-Württemberg		283			2013		
	Micha Fehre	18 April 1997	AfD	Lower Saxony		042					
	Uwe Feiler	2 November 1965	CDU	Brandenburg		058			2013		
	Peter Felser	20 September 1969	AfD	Bavaria					2017		
	Jan Hendrik Feser	1985	AfD			177					
	Thomas Norbert Fetsch	1969	AfD			187					
	Katrin Fey	7 December 1967	Linke			147					
	Sebastian Fiedler	19 June 1973	SPD	North Rhine-Westphalia	Mülheim – Essen I	117	32.6%	29	2021		
	Hauke Horst Ernst Hans Finger	1968	AfD			113					
	Simone Fischer	24 June 1979	Grüne			258	28.3%				
	Christoph Frauenpreiß	15 November 1984	CDU			029	32.7%				
	Thorsten Frei	8 August 1973	CDU	Baden-Württemberg	Schwarzwald-Baar	286	42.3%		2013		
	Michael Frieser	30 March 1964	CSU	Bavaria	Nuremberg South	244	36.0%		2009		
	Götz Frömming	30 August 1968	AfD	Berlin					2017		
	Markus Frohnmaier	25 February 1991	AfD	Baden-Württemberg		260			2017		
	Rainer Galla	23 September 1961	AfD	Brandenburg	Frankfurt (Oder) – Oder-Spree	063	38.2%				
	Boris Gamanov	1986	AfD			296					
	Schahina Gambir	6 June 1991	Grüne	North Rhine-Westphalia		133			2021		
	Matthias Gastel	26 December 1970	Grüne	Baden-Württemberg		262			2013		
	Alexander Gauland	20 February 1941	AfD	Brandenburg		161	32.2%		2017		
	Kathrin Gebel	5 April 1997	Linke			128					
	Wilhelm Gebhard	15 June 1976	CDU			168	32.2%				
	Thomas Gebhart	20 December 1971	CDU	Rhineland-Palatinate		210	38.2%		2009		
	Jonas Geissler	5 June 1984	CSU	Bavaria	Coburg	237	41.9%		2021		
	Katalin Gennburg	5 March 1984	Linke			084					
	Martin Gerster	30 August 1971	SPD	Baden-Württemberg		292			2005		
	Jan-Niclas Gesenhues	12 February 1990	Grüne	North Rhine-Westphalia		127			2021		
	Alexis Giersch	25 September 1962	AfD	Schleswig-Holstein					2025		
	Stefan Glaser	17 March 1990	CDU	Baden-Württemberg	Lörrach – Müllheim	282	33.2%	2026			
	Vinzenz Glaser	15 August 1992	Linke			281					
	Ronald Gläser	1973	AfD			075					
	Angelika Glöckner	5 February 1962	SPD	Rhineland-Palatinate		209			2014		
	Hannes Gnauck	8 August 1991	AfD	Brandenburg	057	057	38.3%		2021		
	Nicole Gohlke	15 November 1975	Linke			219					
	Katrin Göring-Eckardt	3 May 1966	Grüne	Thuringia		192			1998	Faction co-leader (to Dec 2021); Vice-president of the Bundestag (from Dec 2021)	
	Christian Görke	17 March 1962	Linke	Brandenburg		064			2021		
	Hans-Jürgen Goßner	17 November 1970	AfD	Baden-Württemberg		263					
	Kay Gottschalk	12 December 1965	AfD	North Rhine-Westphalia		110			2017		
	Ingeborg Gräßle	2 March 1961	CDU	Baden-Württemberg	Backnang – Schwäbisch Gmünd	269	36.6%		2021		
	Fabian Gramling	5 April 1987	CDU	Baden-Württemberg	Neckar-Zaber	266	39.3%		2021		
	Adrian Grasse	20 January 1975	CDU	Berlin	Berlin-Steglitz-Zehlendorf	078	30.7%				
	Armin Grau	18 March 1959	Grüne	Rhineland-Palatinate		206		2	2021		
	David Gregosz	10 October 1983	CDU			188					
	Kerstin Griese	6 December 1966	SPD	North Rhine-Westphalia		104			2000–2009, 2010		
	Christoph Grimm	3 April 1957	AfD	Mecklenburg-Vorpommern	Ludwigslust-Parchim II – Nordwestmecklenburg II – Landkreis Rostock I	013	36.9%				
	Rainer Gross	9 August 1960	AfD	Bavaria							
	Serap Güler	7 July 1980	CDU	North Rhine-Westphalia		092			2021		
	Lena Gumnior	10 December 1992	Grüne			034					
	Georg Günther	14 May 1988	CDU	Mecklenburg-Vorpommern		015					
	Fritz Güntzler	6 May 1966	CDU	Lower Saxony	053	053	29.1%		2013		
	Ates Gürpinar	25 September 1984	Linke	Bavaria		221			2021		
	Olav Gutting	14 October 1970	CDU	Baden-Württemberg	Bruchsal – Schwetzingen	278	36.1%		2002		
	Gregor Gysi	16 January 1948	Linke	Berlin	Berlin-Treptow-Köpenick	083	41.8%		1990–2002, 2005		
	Christian Haase	6 May 1966	CDU	North Rhine-Westphalia	Höxter – Gütersloh III – Lippe II	135	43.2%		2013		
	Bettina Hagedorn	26 December 1955	SPD	Schleswig-Holstein		009					
	Bettina Hagedorn	26 December 1955	SPD	Schleswig-Holstein		009			2002		
	Ingo Jochen Hahn	1971	AfD			222					
	Florian Hahn	14 March 1974	CSU	Bavaria	Munich Land	220	43.1%		2009		
	Heiko Hain	26 March 1982	CSU			238	40.4%				
	Lars Haise	23 March 1989	AfD	Baden-Württemberg		264					
	Metin Hakverdi	25 June 1969	SPD	Hamburg	Hamburg-Bergedorf – Harburg	023	32.2%		2013		
	Mirco Hanker	1966	AfD			050					
	Jürgen Hardt	30 May 1953	CDU	North Rhine-Westphalia	102	102	32.4%		2009		
	Sebastian Hartmann	7 July 1977	SPD	North Rhine-Westphalia		096			2013		
	Britta Haßelmann	10 December 1961	Grüne	North Rhine-Westphalia		131			2005		
	Matthias Hauer	18 December 1977	CDU	North Rhine-Westphalia	Essen III	119	35.7%		2013		
	Jochen Haug	11 January 1973	AfD	North Rhine-Westphalia		094		9	2017		
	Hubertus Heil	3 November 1972	SPD	Lower Saxony	Gifhorn – Peine	045	33.9%		1998		
	Mechthild Heil	23 August 1961	CDU	Rhineland-Palatinate	Ahrweiler	197	39.3%		2009		
	Frauke Heiligenstadt	24 March 1966	SPD	Lower Saxony	Goslar – Northeim – Osterode	052	30.4%		2021		
	Gabriela Heinrich	18 April 1963	SPD	Bavaria		243			2013		
	Linda Heitmann	2 August 1982	Grüne	Hamburg	Hamburg-Altona	019	27.5%		2021		
	Matthias Helferich	14 October 1988	AfD	North Rhine-Westphalia		142			2021		
	Mark Helfrich	8 September 1978	CDU	Schleswig-Holstein	Steinburg – Dithmarschen Süd	003	35.0%		2013		
	Udo Hemmelgarn	4 May 1959	AfD	North Rhine-Westphalia		134					
	Marc Henrichmann	1 June 1976	CDU	North Rhine-Westphalia	Coesfeld – Steinfurt II	126	45.6%		2017		
	Stefan Henze	1965	AfD			047					
	Diana Herbstreuth	27 February 1981	CDU			194					
	Mareike Hermeier	17 August 1989	Linke			123					
	Nadine Heselhaus	12 October 1978	SPD	North Rhine-Westphalia		125			2021		
	Martin Hess	11 January 1971	AfD	Baden-Württemberg		265			2017		
	Nicole Claudia Hess	1973	AfD								
	Heike Heubach	14 December 1979	SPD	Bavaria		252			2024		
	Moritz Heuberger	11 February 1991	Grüne			080	24.7%				
	Susanne Hierl	29 September 1973	CSU	Bavaria	Amberg	231	44.5%		2021		
	Matthias Fabian Hiller	8 January 1985	CDU			262	37.7%				
	Olaf Hilmer	1972	AfD								
	Karsten Hilse	12 December 1964	AfD	Saxony	Bautzen I	155	48.3%		2017		
	Christian Hirte	23 May 1976	CDU	Thuringia		189		1	2008		
	Nicole Höchst	10 February 1970	AfD	Rhineland-Palatinate		200			2017		
	Alexander Hoffmann	6 March 1975	CSU	Bavaria	Main-Spessart	248	45.5%		2013		
	Philip Hoffmann	21 November 1988	CDU	Saarland	Saarlouis	297	31.8%				
	Anton Hofreiter	2 February 1970	Grüne	Bavaria		220			2005	Faction co-leader (to Dec 2021)	
	Leif-Erik Holm	1 August 1970	AfD	Mecklenburg-Vorpommern		012	35.9%		2017		
	Hendrik Hoppenstedt	14 June 1972	CDU	Lower Saxony		043	34.8%		2013		
	Franziska Hoppermann	8 January 1982	CDU	Hamburg		022			2021		
	Michael Hose	28 September 1984	CDU			192					
	Luke Hoß	3 September 2001	Linke			228					
	Jasmina Hostert	3 December 1982	SPD	Baden-Württemberg		228			2021		
	Verena Hubertz	26 November 1987	SPD	Rhineland-Palatinate		202			2021		
	Gerrit Huy	13 May 1953	AfD	Bavaria		225			2021		
	Cem Ince	9 December 1993	Linke			049					
	Fabian Jacobi	19 June 1973	AfD	North Rhine-Westphalia		092			2017		
	Steffen Janich	22 January 1971	AfD	Saxony	Sächsische Schweiz-Osterzgebirge	157	49.1%		2021		
	Anne Janssen	31 August 1982	CDU	Lower Saxony		026			2021		
	Thomas Jarzombek	28 April 1973	CDU	North Rhine-Westphalia	Düsseldorf I	105	36.1%		2009		
	Alexander Jordan	21 November 1981	CDU	Lower Saxony	Helmstedt – Wolfsburg	051	30.9%				
	Julian-Béla Joswig	14 October 1993	Grüne			199					
	Robin Jünger	1996	AfD			172					
	Oliver Kaczmarek	8 August 1970	SPD	North Rhine-Westphalia	Unna I	143	31.8%		2009		
	Lamya Kaddor	11 June 1978	Grüne	North Rhine-Westphalia		193			2021		
	Elisabeth Kaiser	4 March 1987	SPD	Thuringia		193			2017		
	Maren Kaminski	15 February 1979	Linke			042					
	Kirsten Kappert-Gonther	3 November 1966	Grüne	Bremen		054			2017		
	Macit Karaahmetoğlu	11 July 1968	SPD	Baden-Württemberg		265		14	2021		
	Anja Karliczek	29 April 1971	CDU	North Rhine-Westphalia	Steinfurt III	127	37.9%		2013		
	Malte Kaufmann	14 December 1976	AfD	Baden-Württemberg		274		=	2021		
	Michael Kaufmann	21 April 1964	AfD	Thuringia	Saalfeld-Rudolstadt – Saale-Holzland-Kreis – Saale-Orla-Kreis	194	44.5%		2021		
	Michael Kellner	8 May 1977	Grüne	Brandenburg		057			2021		
	Martina Rose-Marie Kempf	1964	AfD			281					
	Franziska Kersten	19 December 1968	SPD	Saxony-Anhalt		067			2021		
	Stefan Keuter	19 August 1972	AfD	North Rhine-Westphalia		119			2017		
	Rocco Kever	1979	AfD			040					
	Misbah Khan	4 December 1989	Grüne	Rhineland-Palatinate		207			2021		
	Roderich Kiesewetter	11 September 1963	CDU	Baden-Württemberg	Aalen – Heidenheim	270	41.4%		2009		
	Michael Kießling	29 May 1973	CSU	Bavaria	Starnberg – Landsberg am Lech	223	42.9%		2017		
	Georg Kippels	21 September 1959	CDU	North Rhine-Westphalia	Rhein-Erft-Kreis I	090	35.0%	29	2013		
	Helmut Kleebank	18 November 1964	SPD	Berlin	Berlin-Spandau – Charlottenburg North	077	27.5%		2021		
	Ottilie Klein	14 February 1984	CDU	Berlin		081			2021		
	Kurt Kleinschmidt	7 February 1967	AfD	Schleswig-Holstein		002					
	Lars Klingbeil	23 February 1978	SPD	Lower Saxony	Rotenburg I – Heidekreis	035	42.1%		2005, 2009	Party co-leader (from Dec 2021)	
	Julia Klöckner	16 December 1972	CDU	Rhineland-Palatinate	200	200	32.3%		2002–2011, 2021		
	Annika Klose	24 June 1992	SPD	Berlin		074			2021		
	Tim Klüssendorf	16 August 1991	SPD	Schleswig-Holstein	Lübeck	011	28.1%		2021		
	Maximilian Kneller	1993	AfD	North Rhine-Westphalia		131					
	Sieghard Knodel	1961		Baden-Württemberg				18		Ex-AfD	
	Axel Knoerig	1 March 1967	CDU	Lower Saxony	Diepholz – Nienburg I	033	35.4%		2009		
	Ferat Koçak	26 May 1979	Linke	Berlin		081	30.0%				
	Heinrich Friedrich Koch	1962	AfD			275					
	Jürgen Kögel	1958	AfD			267					
	Achim Köhler	1964	AfD			277					
	Cansin Köktürk	13 June 1993	Linke			139					
	Daniel Kölbl	29 October 1993	CDU			007	31.8%				
	Jörn König	22 October 1967	AfD	Lower Saxony		041					
	Anne König	4 December 1984	CDU	North Rhine-Westphalia	Borken II	125	47.9%		2021		
	Carsten Körber	11 June 1979	CDU	Saxony		164			2013		
	Konrad Körner	27 April 1992	CSU			241	35.9%				
	Jan Köstering	22 October 1997	Linke			098					
	Bärbel Kofler	24 May 1967	SPD	Bavaria		224		2	2004		
	Johann Georg Koller	15 July 1971	CSU			228	40.8%				
	Enrico Komning	6 August 1968	AfD	Mecklenburg-Vorpommern	016	016	45.2%		2017		
	Markus Koob	5 December 1977	CDU	Hesse	Hochtaunus	175	37.8%		2013		
	Chantal Kopf	20 March 1995	Grüne	Baden-Württemberg	Freiburg	281	32.5%		2021		
	Stefan Korbach	16 March 1958	CDU			178	30.7%				
	Thomas Korell	1983	AfD	Saxony-Anhalt	Altmark – Jerichower Land	066	39.2%				
	Steffen Kotré	29 April 1971	AfD	Brandenburg	062	062	33.6%		2017		
	Rainer Kraft	8 January 1974	AfD	Bavaria					2017		
	Maximilian Krah	1977	AfD			162	44.2%				
	Anette Kramme	10 October 1967	SPD	Bavaria		236		4	1998		
	Manuel Krauthausen	12 May 1992	AfD	North Rhine-Westphalia							
	Dunja Kreiser	27 June 1971	SPD	Lower Saxony	Salzgitter – Wolfenbüttel	049	30.6%		2021		
	Gunther Krichbaum	4 May 1964	CDU	Baden-Württemberg	Pforzheim	279	37.1%		2002		
	Lukas Krieger	11 November 1987	CDU	Berlin	Berlin-Charlottenburg-Wilmersdorf	079	26.3%				
	Günter Krings	7 August 1969	CDU	North Rhine-Westphalia	Mönchengladbach	108	36.2%		2002		
	Martin Kröber	12 February 1992	SPD	Saxony-Anhalt		069			2021		
	Tilman Kuban	26 May 1987	CDU	Lower Saxony		047			2021		
	Thomas Ladzinski	1989	AfD	Saxony	Dresden I	158	29.4%				
	Pierre Lamely	12 January 1981	AfD	Hesse		173					
	Ricarda Lang	17 January 1994	Grüne	Baden-Württemberg		269			2021		
	Ulrich Lange	6 June 1969	CSU	Bavaria	Donau-Ries	253	45.1%		2009		
	Armin Laschet	18 February 1961	CDU	North Rhine-Westphalia		086	32.3%		1994–1998, 2021	Party leader (to Jan 2022)	
	Ina Latendorf	26 June 1971	Linke	Mecklenburg-Vorpommern		012			2021		
	Silke Launert	27 December 1976	CSU	Bavaria	Bayreuth	236	44.5%		2013		
	Karl Lauterbach	21 February 1963	SPD	North Rhine-Westphalia	Leverkusen – Cologne IV	100	32.7%		2005		
	Caren Lay	11 December 1972	Linke	Saxony		155			2009		
	Jens Lehmann	19 December 1967	CDU	Saxony		151			2017		
	Sven Lehmann	4 December 1979	Grüne	North Rhine-Westphalia	Cologne II	093	34.1%		2017		
	Sonja Lemke	22 November 1991	Linke			142			2025		
	Steffi Lemke	19 January 1968	Grüne	Saxony-Anhalt		070			1994–2002, 2013		
	Rebecca Lenhard	24 May 1995	Grüne			243					
	Sascha Lensing	1973	AfD			115					
	Andreas Lenz	23 April 1981	CSU	Bavaria	Erding – Ebersberg	212	45.9%		2013		
	Esra Limbacher	1 May 1989	SPD	Saarland	Homburg	299	30.5%		2021		
	Helge Limburg	25 October 1982	Grüne	Lower Saxony		046			2021		
	Helge Lindh	6 December 1976	SPD	North Rhine-Westphalia	Wuppertal I	101	33.5%		2017		
	Andrea Lindholz	25 September 1970	CSU	Bavaria	Aschaffenburg	246	43.8%		2013		
	Carsten Linnemann	10 August 1977	CDU	North Rhine-Westphalia	Paderborn	136	45.5%		2009		
	Patricia Lips	21 December 1963	CDU	Hesse	186	186	34.0%		2002		
	Denise Loop	19 May 1994	Grüne	Schleswig-Holstein		002			2021		
	Andrea Lübcke	9 December 1978	Grüne	Brandenburg		062		3	2026		
	Rüdiger Lucassen	19 August 1951	AfD	North Rhine-Westphalia		091			2017		
	Max Lucks	19 April 1997	Grüne	North Rhine-Westphalia		139			2021		
	Jan-Marco Luczak	2 October 1975	CDU	Berlin		080			2009		
	Daniela Ludwig	7 July 1975	CSU	Bavaria	Rosenheim	221	40.9%		2002		
	Saskia Ludwig	23 May 1968	CDU			060					
	Anna Lührmann	14 June 1983	Grüne	Hesse		180			2002–2009, 2021		
	Bettina Lugk	3 February 1982	SPD	North Rhine-Westphalia		149		14	2021		
	Sebastian Maack	1969	AfD			076					
	Tanja Machalet	1 May 1974	SPD	Rhineland-Palatinate		203			2021		
	Klaus Mack	28 April 1973	CDU	Baden-Württemberg	Calw	280	39.0%		2021		
	Isabel Mackensen-Geis	29 September 1986	SPD	Rhineland-Palatinate		207			2019		
	Holger Mann	19 February 1979	SPD	Saxony		151			2021		
	David Mandrella	12 April 2001	SPD	Bavaria		231		15	2026		
	Johann Martel	1979	AfD			276					
	Parsa Marvi	6 February 1982	SPD	Baden-Württemberg		271			2021		
	Katja Mast	4 February 1971	SPD	Baden-Württemberg		279			2005		
	Andreas Mattfeldt	28 September 1969	CDU	Lower Saxony	Osterholz – Verden	034	35.9%		2009		
	Markus Matzerath	1970	AfD								
	Andreas Mayer	1995	AfD			253					
	Stephan Mayer	15 December 1973	CSU	Bavaria	Altötting	211	43.9%		2002		
	Zoe Mayer	7 August 1995	Grüne	Baden-Württemberg	Karlsruhe-Stadt	271	30.6%		2021		
	Volker Mayer-Lay	22 June 1981	CDU	Baden-Württemberg	Bodensee	293	40.0%		2021		
	Tamara Mazzi	13 January 1992	Linke			005					
	Danny Meiners	1979	AfD			031					
	Pascal Meiser	7 March 1975	Linke	Berlin	082	082	34.7%		2017		
	Michael Meister	9 June 1961	CDU	Hesse	Bergstraße	187	36.3%		1994		
	Stella Merendino	8 April 1994	Linke			074					
	Friedrich Merz	11 November 1955	CDU	North Rhine-Westphalia	Hochsauerlandkreis	146	47.7%		1994–2009, 2021	Party leader (from Jan 2022); Faction leader (from Feb 2022)	
	Jan Metzler	5 July 1981	CDU	Rhineland-Palatinate	Worms	205	35.3%		2013		
	Knuth Hans-Peter Meyer-Soltau	1965	AfD			139					
	Swantje Michaelsen	4 October 1979	Grüne	Lower Saxony		042			2021		
	Kathrin Michel	17 April 1963	SPD	Saxony		155			2021		
	Mathias Middelberg	14 December 1964	CDU	Lower Saxony	039	039	29.7%		2009		
	Matthias Miersch	19 December 1968	SPD	Lower Saxony	Hannover-Land II (047)	047	31.7%	7	2005		
	Matthias Mieves	30 December 1985	SPD	Rhineland-Palatinate	Kaiserslautern	208	28.0%		2021		
	Irene Mihalic	17 November 1976	Grüne	North Rhine-Westphalia		122			2013		
	Boris Mijatović	4 February 1974	Grüne	Hesse		167			2021		
	Sergej Minich	1987	AfD			054					
	Sahra Mirow	10 January 1984	Linke			274					
	Reinhard Wilhelm Mixl	1961	AfD			233					
	Siemtje Möller	20 July 1983	SPD	Lower Saxony	Friesland – Wilhelmshaven – Wittmund	026	35.4%		2017		
	Stefan Möller	1975	AfD	Thuringia		189	38.5%				
	Claudia Moll	15 December 1968	SPD	North Rhine-Westphalia		087			2017		
	Matthias Moosdorf	20 April 1965	AfD	Saxony	Zwickau	164	39.9%		2021		
	Christian Anton Moser	14 November 1989	CSU			213	43.1%				
	Axel Müller	24 July 1963	CDU	Baden-Württemberg	Ravensburg	294	38.7%		2017		
	Carsten Müller	8 May 1970	CDU	Lower Saxony		050			2017		
	Claudia Müller	10 August 1981	Grüne	Mecklenburg-Vorpommern		015			2017		
	Florian Müller	14 September 1987	CDU	North Rhine-Westphalia	Olpe – Märkischer Kreis I	148	42.1%		2021		
	Sascha Müller	24 April 1970	Grüne	Bavaria		244			2021		
	Sepp Müller	22 January 1989	CDU	Saxony-Anhalt		070			2017		
	Sebastian Münzenmaier	2 July 1989	AfD	Rhineland-Palatinate		208			2017		
	Rolf Mützenich	25 June 1959	SPD	North Rhine-Westphalia		094			2002	Faction leader	
	Stefan Nacke	27 January 1976	CDU	North Rhine-Westphalia		128			2021		
	Sara Nanni	1987	Grüne	North Rhine-Westphalia		106			2021		
	Christoph Naser	29 July 1991	CDU	Baden-Württemberg	Tübingen	290	31.7%		2026		
	Rasha Nasr	12 May 1992	SPD	Saxony		158			2021		
	Edgar Naujok	25 June 1960	AfD	Saxony	Leipzig-Land	153	38.2%		2021		
	Charlotte Neuhäuser	25 November 1998	Linke			136					
	Ophelia Nick	24 January 1973	Grüne	North Rhine-Westphalia		104			2021		
	Iris Nieland	1960	AfD			209					
	Jan Nolte	30 December 1988	AfD	Hesse		4		2017			
	Konstantin von Notz	21 January 1981	Grüne	Schleswig-Holstein		010			2009		
	Omid Nouripour	18 June 1975	Grüne	Hesse		182			2006		
	Wilfried Oellers	16 September 1975	CDU	North Rhine-Westphalia	Heinsberg	088	41.5%		2013		
	Florian Oest	25 August 1987	CDU			156					
	Cansu Özdemir	8 September 1988	Linke								
	Mahmut Özdemir	23 June 1987	SPD	North Rhine-Westphalia	Duisburg II	115	33.1%		2013		
	Aydan Özoğuz	31 May 1967	SPD	Hamburg	Hamburg-Wandsbek	022	32.3%		2009	Vice-president of the Bundestag	
	Harald Orthey	25 June 1968	CDU		203	203	35.7%				
	Josephine Ortleb	25 November 1986	SPD	Saarland	Saarbrücken	296	32.4%		2017		
	Florian Oßner	5 July 1980	CSU	Bavaria	Landshut	227	34.2%		2013		
	Josef Oster	4 January 1971	CDU	Rhineland-Palatinate	Koblenz	198	35.7%		2017		
	Karoline Otte	11 September 1996	Grüne	Lower Saxony		052			2021		
	Gerold Otten	7 December 1955	AfD	Bavaria		220			2017		
	Christos Pantazis	9 October 1975	SPD	Lower Saxony	Braunschweig	050	33.4%		2013		
	Luigi Pantisano	28 July 1979	Linke			258					
	Andreas Paul	1978	AfD			027					
	Denis Pauli	1978	AfD								
	Thomas Pauls	2 October 1986	CDU		176	176	33.7%				
	Lisa Paus	19 September 1968	Grüne	Berlin		079			2009		
	Natalie Pawlik	26 August 1992	SPD	Hesse		176			2021		
	Jens Peick	16 August 1981	SPD	North Rhine-Westphalia	Dortmund I	141	30.6%		2021		
	Sören Pellmann	11 February 1977	Linke	Saxony	Leipzig II	152	36.8%		2017	Group co-leader	
	Tobias Peterka	4 September 1982	AfD	Bavaria		236			2021		
	Paula Piechotta	19 September 1986	Grüne	Saxony		152			2017		
	Stephan Pilsinger	17 February 1987	CSU	Bavaria	Munich West/Centre	219	34.7%		2017		
	Boris Pistorius	14 March 1960	SPD		042	042	36.2%				
	Christoph Ploß	19 July 1985	CDU	Hamburg		021			2017		
	Martin Plum	26 February 1982	CDU	North Rhine-Westphalia	Viersen	110	40.0%		2021		
	Oliver Pöpsel	6 April 1973	CDU		145	145	37.3%				
	Jan-Wilhelm Pohlmann	31 July 1986	CDU	Hesse	Waldeck	166	31.1%				
	Filiz Polat	11 July 1978	Grüne	Lower Saxony		038			2017		
	Sabine Poschmann	4 October 1968	SPD	North Rhine-Westphalia	Dortmund II	142	32.4%		2013		
	David Preisendanz	4 January 1984	CDU		261	261	37.0%				
	Stephan Protschka	8 November 1977	AfD	Bavaria		229			2017		
	Kerstin Przygodda	1962	AfD			011					
	Marcel Queckemeyer	1980	AfD			038					
	Martin Rabanus	22 September 1971	SPD	Hesse		177			2013–2021, 2024		
	Thomas Rachel	17 May 1962	CDU	North Rhine-Westphalia	Düren	089	39.9%		1994		
	Kerstin Radomski	1 November 1974	CDU	North Rhine-Westphalia	113	113	31.9%		2013		
	Alexander Radwan	30 August 1964	CSU	Bavaria	Bad Tölz-Wolfratshausen – Miesbach	222	46.4%		2013		
	Alois Rainer	7 January 1965	CSU	Bavaria	Straubing	230	46.3%		2013		
	Bodo Ramelow	16 February 1956	Linke		192	192	36.8%				
	Anna Rathert	1977	AfD			120					
	Arne Raue	1970	AfD		060	060	33.6%				
	Christian Reck	1987	AfD		154	154	45.3%				
	Pascal Reddig	10 April 1995	CDU		179	179	32.0%				
	Henning Rehbaum	10 September 1973	CDU	North Rhine-Westphalia	Warendorf	129	41.6%		2021		
	Lukas Rehm	5 February 1990	AfD	Bavaria		215					
	Truels Reichardt	5 June 1994	SPD	Schleswig-Holstein		002					
	Martin Reichardt	30 July 1969	AfD	Saxony-Anhalt	072	072	44.4%		2017		
	Markus Reichel	15 July 1968	CDU	Saxony		158			2021		
	Heidi Reichinnek	19 April 1988	Linke	Lower Saxony		039			2021	Group co-leader	
	Anja Reinalter	1 May 1970	Grüne	Baden-Württemberg		292			2021		
	Lea Reisner	9 March 1989	Linke			093					
	Martin Renner	5 May 1954	AfD	North Rhine-Westphalia		103			2017		
	Matthias Rentzsch	1977	AfD	Saxony	Dresden II – Bautzen II	159	29.9%				
	Sylvia Rietenberg	20 July 1965	Grüne			128	31.2%				
	Daniel Rinkert	11 December 1987	SPD	North Rhine-Westphalia		107			2022		
	Norbert Röttgen	2 July 1965	CDU	North Rhine-Westphalia	Rhein-Sieg-Kreis II	097	43.8%		1994		
	Thomas Röwekamp	18 September 1966	CDU	Bremen		054			2021		
	Dennis Rohde	24 June 1986	SPD	Lower Saxony	Oldenburg – Ammerland	027	34.4%		2013		
	Lars Rohwer	1 February 1972	CDU	Saxony		159			2021		
	Sebastian Roloff	28 January 1983	SPD	Bavaria		218			2021		
	Claudia Roth	15 May 1955	Grüne	Bavaria		251			1998–2001, 2002	Vice-president of the Bundestag (to Dec 2021)	
	Johannes Rothenberger	7 August 1980	CDU			284	38.2%				
	Rainer Rothfuß	19 April 1971	AfD	Bavaria		256			2023		
	Philipp Rottwilm	28 August 1984	SPD			169					
	Stefan Rouenhoff	23 December 1978	CDU	North Rhine-Westphalia	Kleve	111	41.2%	24	2017		
	Thorsten Rudolph	15 March 1974	SPD	Rhineland-Palatinate		198			2021		
	Angela Rudzka	1984	AfD			049					
	Corinna Rüffer	11 October 1975	Grüne	Rhineland-Palatinate		202			2013		
	Bernd Rützel	2 October 1968	SPD	Bavaria		248			2013		
	Daniela Rump	13 January 1996	SPD	Lower Saxony	Hildesheim	048	30.7%				
	Ruben Rupp	1990	AfD			269					
	Albert Rupprecht	10 June 1968	CSU	Bavaria	Weiden	234	43.5%		2002		
	Johann Saathoff	9 December 1967	SPD	Lower Saxony	Aurich – Emden	024	41.2%		2013		
	Kassem Taher Saleh	1 June 1993	Grüne	Saxony		158			2021		
	Zada Salihović	28 March 2000	Linke								
	Catarina dos Santos-Wintz	8 July 1994	CDU	North Rhine-Westphalia	087	087	40.1%		2021		
	Carl-Philipp Sassenrath	26 February 1990	CDU	North Rhine-Westphalia	Neuss I	107	36.3%				
	Jamila Schäfer	30 April 1993	Grüne	Bavaria		218			2021		
	Sebastian Schäfer	11 July 1979	Grüne	Baden-Württemberg		261			2021		
	Johannes Schätzl	10 June 1993	SPD	Bavaria	Passau	228					
	Bernd Schattner	27 June 1968	AfD	Rhineland-Palatinate		210			2021		
	Ulle Schauws	30 April 1966	Grüne	North Rhine-Westphalia		113			2013		
	Nina Scheer	11 September 1971	SPD	Schleswig-Holstein		010			2013		
	Raimond Scheirich	1990	AfD	Bavaria		251					
	Christiane Schenderlein	17 October 1981	CDU	Saxony		150			2021		
	Volker Scheurell	1967	AfD	Saxony-Anhalt	Anhalt – Dessau – Wittenberg	070	38.6%				
	Ulrike Schielke-Ziesing	17 June 1969	AfD	Mecklenburg-Vorpommern	017	017	41.1%		2017		
	Lars Schieske	1977	AfD	Brandenburg	Cottbus – Spree-Neiße	064	42.0%				
	Carina Schießl	1990	AfD	Bavaria		232					
	Manfred Schiller	1961	AfD			234					
	Manfred Schiller	23 September 1961	AfD	Bavaria		234			2024		
	David Schliesing	26 January 1983	Linke			067					
	Christoph Schmid	8 July 1976	SPD	Bavaria		253			2021		
	Nils Schmid	11 July 1973	SPD	Baden-Württemberg		262		2	2017		
	Dagmar Schmidt	13 March 1973	SPD	Hesse		171			2013		
	Jan Wenzel Schmidt	8 October 1991	AfD	Saxony-Anhalt	067	067	43.2%		2021		
	Henri Schmidt	7 May 1983	CDU	Schleswig-Holstein	Herzogtum Lauenburg – Stormarn-Süd	010	32.7%				
	Julian Schmidt	1989	AfD			170					
	Paul Schmidt	1966	AfD								
	Sebastian Schmidt	8 August 1993	CDU			009	34.8%				
	Stefan Schmidt	19 May 1981	Grüne	Bavaria		232			2017		
	Uwe Schmidt	14 February 1966	SPD	Bremen	Bremen II – Bremerhaven	055	30.3%		2017		
	Carsten Schneider	23 January 1976	SPD	Thuringia	Erfurt – Weimar – Weimarer Land II	192			1998		
	Julia Schneider	5 March 1990	Grüne			075	25.8%				
	Patrick Schnieder	1 May 1968	CDU	Rhineland-Palatinate	Bitburg	201	40.2%		2009		
	Marlene Schönberger	6 December 1990	Grüne	Bavaria		229			2021		
	Evelyn Schötz	30 June 1961	Linke			245					
	Olaf Scholz	14 June 1958	SPD	Brandenburg	Potsdam – Potsdam-Mittelmark II – Teltow-Fläming II	061	21.8%		1998–2001, 2002–2011, 2021		
	Johannes Schraps	17 August 1983	SPD	Lower Saxony	Hameln-Pyrmont – Holzminden	046	33.0%		2017		
	Felix Schreiner	29 January 1986	CDU	Baden-Württemberg	Waldshut	288	37.7%		2017		
	Michael Schrodi	3 July 1977	SPD	Bavaria		214			2017		
	Stefan Falko Schröder	1983	AfD			190	32.5%				
	Georg Schroeter	1950	AfD			144					
	Bernd Willi Karl Schuhmann	1964	AfD			249					
	Marvin Schulz	15 January 1994	CDU	Berlin	Berlin-Reinickendorf	076	30.9%				
	Lisa Schubert	6 September 2002	Linke	North Rhine-Westphalia		106					
	Uwe Schulz	12 December 1961	AfD	Hesse					2017		
	Svenja Schulze	29 September 1968	SPD	North Rhine-Westphalia		128			2021		
	Frank Schwabe	12 November 1970	SPD	North Rhine-Westphalia	Recklinghausen I	120	33.1%		2005		
	Stefan Schwartze	23 May 1974	SPD	North Rhine-Westphalia		132			2009		
	Andreas Schwarz	3 March 1965	SPD	Bavaria		235			2013		
	Rita Schwarzelühr-Sutter	13 October 1962	SPD	Baden-Württemberg		288			2005		
	Ines Schwerdtner	26 August 1989	Linke		085	085	34.0%				
	Stefan Seidler	18 December 1979	SSW	Schleswig-Holstein		001		1	2021		
	Detlef Seif	15 August 1962	CDU	North Rhine-Westphalia	Euskirchen – Rhein-Erft-Kreis II	091	38.4%		2009		
	Dario Seifert	1994	AfD	Mecklenburg-Vorpommern	Vorpommern-Rügen – Vorpommern-Greifswald I	015	37.3%				
	Nora Seitz	10 May 1984	CDU			161					
	Lina Seitzl	3 June 1989	SPD	Baden-Württemberg		287			2021		
	Martin Sichert	10 June 1980	AfD	Bavaria		026			2017		
	Thomas Silberhorn	12 November 1968	CSU	Bavaria	Bamberg	235	39.4%		2002		
	Björn Simon	18 May 1981	CDU	Hesse	Offenbach	184	31.2%		2017		
	Nyke Slawik	7 January 1994	Grüne	North Rhine-Westphalia		100			2021		
	Tino Sorge	4 March 1975	CDU	Saxony-Anhalt		069			2013		
	Jens Spahn	16 May 1980	CDU	North Rhine-Westphalia	Steinfurt I – Borken I	123	41.8%		2002		
	René Springer	15 July 1979	AfD	Brandenburg	059	059	36.1%		2017		
	Svenja Stadler	26 August 1976	SPD	Lower Saxony		036			2013		
	Katrin Staffler	4 November 1981	CSU	Bavaria	Fürstenfeldbruck	214	42.6%		2017		
	Julia-Christina Stange	25 April 1978	Linke			205					
	Till Steffen	22 July 1973	Grüne	Hamburg	Hamburg-Eimsbüttel	020	27.8%		2021		
	Wolfgang Stefinger	20 April 1985	CSU	Bavaria		217	36.3%				
	Albert Stegeman	9 March 1976	CDU	Lower Saxony		031	43.8%				
	Ralf Stegner	2 October 1959	SPD	Schleswig-Holstein	Pinneberg	007					
	Sandra Stein	22 October 1986	Grüne			146					
	Sebastian Steineke	19 June 1973	CDU			056					
	Johannes Steiniger	18 June 1987	CDU	Rhineland-Palatinate	Neustadt – Speyer	207	34.7%		2013		
	Hanna Steinmüller	9 April 1993	Grüne	Berlin	Berlin-Mitte	074	25.3%		2021		
	Thomas Stephan	1970	AfD			207					
	Christian von Stetten	24 July 1970	CDU	Baden-Württemberg	Schwäbisch Hall – Hohenlohe	268	36.4%		2002		
	Dieter Stier	29 June 1964	CDU	Saxony-Anhalt		072			2009		
	Beatrix von Storch	27 May 1971	AfD	Berlin		085			2017		
	Stephan Stracke	1 April 1974	CSU	Bavaria	Ostallgäu	257	45.5%		2009		
	Otto Strauß	19 February 1954	AfD								
	Katja Strauss-Köster	19 August 1970	CDU			138	30.9%				
	Hendrik Streeck	7 August 1977	CDU	North Rhine-Westphalia	Bonn	095	33.3%		2025		
	Ruppert Stüwe	21 May 1978	SPD	Berlin		078			2021		
	Christina Stumpp	16 November 1987	CDU	Baden-Württemberg	Waiblingen	264	37.7%		2021		
	Vivian Tauschwitz	29 July 1994	CDU			035					
	Tobias Teich	1984	AfD			217					
	Awet Tesfaiesus	5 October 1974	Grüne	Hesse		168			2021		
	Robert Teske	1990	AfD	Thuringia		195	42.1%				
	Roland Theis	17 March 1980	CDU	Saarland		298	33.9%				
	Hans Theiss	20 September 1977	CSU			216	32.4%				
	Michael Thews	6 September 1964	SPD	North Rhine-Westphalia	Hamm – Unna II	144	32.2%		2013		
	Ulrich Thoden	16 May 1973	Linke			127					
	Alexander Throm	8 September 1968	CDU	Baden-Württemberg	Heilbronn	267	35.0%		2017		
	Astrid Timmermann-Fechter	22 June 1963	CDU	North Rhine-Westphalia		117					
	Markus Töns	1 January 1964	SPD	North Rhine-Westphalia		122	31.4%		2017		
	Gerhard Trabert	3 July 1956	Linke	Rhineland-Palatinate		204					
	Bastian Treuheit	1998	AfD	Bavaria		242					
	Anja Troff-Schaffarzyk	1 October 1969	SPD	Lower Saxony		025			2021		
	Derya Türk-Nachbaur	10 April 1973	SPD	Baden-Württemberg		286			2021		
	Katrin Uhlig	5 July 1982	Grüne	North Rhine-Westphalia		095			2021		
	Martina Uhr	1961	AfD	Lower Saxony		025					
	Aaron Valent	14 March 1997	Linke	Bavaria		250					
	Isabelle Vandre	27 July 1989	Linke	Brandenburg		061					
	Julia Verlinden	18 January 1979	Grüne	Lower Saxony		037			2017		
	Kerstin Vieregge	6 September 1976	CDU	North Rhine-Westphalia	134	134	31.3%		2017		
	Marja-Liisa Völlers	28 September 1984	SPD	Lower Saxony	Nienburg II – Schaumburg	040	31.7%		2017		
	Dirk Vöpel	29 May 1971	SPD	North Rhine-Westphalia	Oberhausen – Wesel III	116	31.4%		2013		
	Ingo Vogel	29 April 1976	SPD	North Rhine-Westphalia		118	30.3%	59			
	Oliver Vogt	15 July 1977	CDU	North Rhine-Westphalia	133	133	32.1%	19	2021		
	Donata Vogtschmidt	24 February 1998	Linke	Thuringia		188		2			
	Johannes Volkmann	11 December 1996	CDU	Hesse		171	34.3%				
	Sarah Vollath	26 December 1995	Linke	Bavaria		215		3			
	Christoph de Vries	4 December 1974	CDU	Hamburg		018		3	2017		
	Mayra Vriesema	25 December 1999	Grüne					5	2025		
	Johann Wadephul	10 February 1963	CDU	Schleswig-Holstein	004	004	32.8%		2009		
	Niklas Wagener	16 April 1998	Grüne	Bavaria		246			2021		
	Robin Wagener	16 August 1980	Grüne	North Rhine-Westphalia		134			2021		
	Carolin Wagner	1 October 1982	SPD	Bavaria		232			2021		
	Johannes Wagner	1 August 1991	Grüne	Bavaria		237			2021		
	Sascha H. Wagner	23 May 1980	Linke	North Rhine-Westphalia		116					
	Siegfried Walch	8 April 1984	CSU			224	46.9%				
	Maja Wallstein	18 March 1986	SPD	Brandenburg		064			2021		
	Daniel Walter	27 March 1991	SPD	North Rhine-Westphalia		089					
	Nina Warken	15 May 1979	CDU	Baden-Württemberg	Odenwald – Tauber	276	42.8%		2013–2017, 2018		
	Carmen Wegge	24 September 1989	SPD	Bavaria		223		12	2021		
	Alice Weidel	6 February 1979	AfD	Baden-Württemberg		293		1	2017	Faction co-leader; Party co-leader (from Jun 2022)	
	Mathias Weiser	5 December 1986	AfD	Saxony		165	43.3%	14			
	Anja Weisgerber	11 March 1976	CSU	Bavaria	Schweinfurt	249	43.4%	12	2013		
	Maria-Lena Weiss	4 April 1981	CDU	Baden-Württemberg	Rottweil – Tuttlingen	285	38.9%		2021		
	Claudia Weiss	1975	AfD	Saxony-Anhalt		069	32.2%	5			
	Sven Wendorf	1972	AfD	Schleswig-Holstein		008		5			
	Kai Whittaker	10 April 1985	CDU	Baden-Württemberg	Rastatt	273	38.8%		2013		
	Johannes Wiegelmann	2 February 1993	CDU	Hesse		174	34.1%				
	Wolfgang Wiehle	20 October 1964	AfD	Bavaria		218			2017		
	Klaus Wiener	21 August 1962	CDU	North Rhine-Westphalia	Mettmann I	103	36.6%		2021		
	Dirk Wiese	11 July 1983	SPD	North Rhine-Westphalia		146			2013		
	Christin Willnat	3 April 1986	Linke	Brandenburg		060					
	Klaus-Peter Willsch	28 February 1961	CDU	Hesse	Rheingau-Taunus – Limburg	177	36.8%		1998		
	Johannes Winkel	28 October 1991	CDU	North Rhine-Westphalia	Düsseldorf II	106	28.7%				
	Elisabeth Winkelmeier-Becker	15 September 1962	CDU	North Rhine-Westphalia	Rhein-Sieg-Kreis I	096	35.6%		2005		
	Tobias Winkler	16 January 1978	CSU	Bavaria	Fürth	242	37.4%		2021		
	Tina Winklmann	26 February 1980	Grüne	Bavaria		233			2021		
	Christian Wirth	27 April 1963	AfD	Saarland					2017		
	Janine Wissler	23 May 1981	Linke	Hesse		181			2021	Party co-leader	
	Mechthilde Wittmann	12 December 1967	CSU	Bavaria	Oberallgäu	256	36.8%		2021		
	Alexander Herbert Wolf	1967	AfD	Hamburg	Hamburg-Eimsbüttel	020					
	Mareike Wulf	15 November 1979	CDU	Lower Saxony	Hameln-Pyrmont – Holzminden	046			2021		
	Gülistan Yüksel	27 March 1962	SPD	North Rhine-Westphalia	139	139	32.7%		2013		
	Christian Zaum	1969	AfD			147					
	Daniel Zerbin	1 February 1973	AfD	North Rhine-Westphalia		140					
	Anne Zerr	21 July 1993	Linke			289					
	Emmi Zeulner	27 March 1987	CSU	Bavaria	Kulmbach	230	49.3%		2013		
	Kay-Uwe Ziegler	27 October 1963	AfD	Saxony-Anhalt	Anhalt	073	43.8%		2021		
	Paul Ziemiak	6 September 1985	CDU	North Rhine-Westphalia	Märkischer Kreis II	149	38.8%	3	2017		
	Stefan Zierke	5 December 1970	SPD	Brandenburg	Uckermark – Barnim I	057		3	2013		
	Diana Zimmer	9 July 1998	AfD	Baden-Württemberg		279		8			
	Nicolas Zippelius	1 August 1987	CDU	Baden-Württemberg	Karlsruhe-Land	272	39.2%		2021		
	Jörg Zirwes	1968	AfD			199		7			
	Vanessa-Kim Zobel	8 February 1988	CDU	Lower Saxony		030	36.3%	15			
	Ulrich von Zons	1968	AfD	North Rhine-Westphalia		145		21			
	Armand Zorn	18 July 1988	SPD	Hesse	Frankfurt am Main I	181		3	2021		
	Katrin Zschau	9 June 1976	SPD	Mecklenburg-Vorpommern	Rostock – Landkreis Rostock II	014		3	2021–2025, 2026		

== List of former members ==
Image	Name	Year of birth	Party	State	Constituency	Vote%	List#	Member since	Date of departure	Cause	Replacement
	Annalena Baerbock	1980	GRÜNE	Brandenburg	Potsdam – Potsdam-Mittelmark II – Teltow-Fläming II	15.9 %	1	2013	30 June 2025	Presidency of the United Nations General Assembly	Andrea Lübcke
	Uwe Foullong	1957	Linke	North Rhine-Westphalia	Bottrop – Recklinghausen III	5.7%	10	2025	31 July 2025	Health reasons	Lisa Schubert
	Robert Habeck	1969	GRÜNE	Schleswig-Holstein	Flensburg – Schleswig	22.6%	2	2021	31 August 2025	Resignation to pursue academic work	Mayra Vriesema
	Ansgar Heveling	1972	CDU	North Rhine-Westphalia	Krefeld I – Neuss II	37.8%	19	2009	31 May 2026	Presidency of the Bundesrechnungshof	Michael Breilmann
	Andreas Jung	1975	CDU	Baden-Württemberg	Konstanz	37.7%	3	2005	18 May 2026	Appointment as Baden-Württemberg minister of education	Stefan Glaser
	Frank Junge	1967	SPD	Mecklenburg-Vorpommern	Ludwigslust-Parchim II – Nordwestmecklenburg II – Landkreis Rostock I		2nd	2013	19 July 2026	Mayoralty of Wismar	Katrin Zschau
	Ronja Kemmer	1989	CDU	Baden-Württemberg	Ulm	38.8%	4	2014	21 May 2026	Ministerial directorate at the Baden-Württemberg Ministry of the Interior	Christoph Naser
	Henning Otte	1968	CDU	Lower Saxony	Celle – Uelzen	35.2%	12	2005	5 June 2025	Commissioner for the Armed Forces of the German Bundestag	Reza Asghari
	Volker Schnurrbusch	1958	AfD	Schleswig-Holstein	Ostholstein – Stormarn-Nord	17.3%	3	2025	4 April 2025	Acceptance of a vacant seat in the European Parliament	Alexis Giersch
	Carsten Träger	1973	SPD	Bavaria			1	2013	21 March 2026	Death	David Mandrella

== See also ==
- Politics of Germany
- List of Bundestag members
