= Lisa Schubert =

German politician (born 2002)

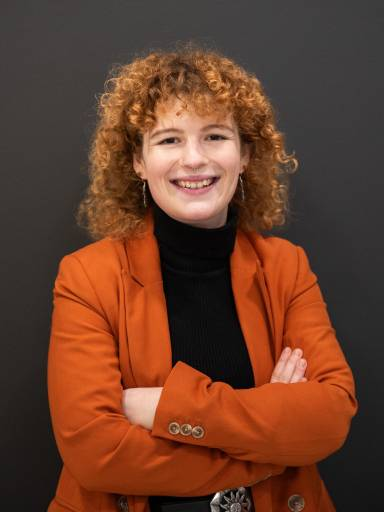
- Schubert in 2025

Member of the Bundestag
- Incumbent
- Assumed office 1 August 2025
- Preceded by: Uwe Foullong
- Constituency: North Rhine-Westphalia

Personal details
- Born: 2002 (age 23–24)
- Party: Die Linke
- Education: Heinrich Heine University Düsseldorf

Lisa "Lizzy" Schubert (born 2002) is a German politician from the Die Linke party. She has been a member of the German Bundestag since 2025.

== Life ==
Schubert has been studying social sciences at Heinrich Heine University Düsseldorf since 2022. There she is a member of the Socialist Democratic Student Association. She is non-binary and lives in the Friedrichstadt district of Düsseldorf.

Schubert has been a member of Die Linke since 2023. In the 2025 German federal election, she ran in the Düsseldorf II constituency and ranked 14th on Die Linke's state list, but initially did not enter parliament. On 1 August 2025, she succeeded Uwe Foullong in the Bundestag. She is the youngest member of parliament in the 21st legislative term and the first openly non-binary member of parliament in the history of the German Bundestag. Schubert is a member of the Finance Committee.

== Political positions ==
Schubert has described Israel's actions in the war in Israel and Gaza since 2023 as genocide. According to her own statement, she represents Queerfeminismus and anti-militarist positions. On 25 September 2025, Schubert, along with Die Linke MPs Vinzenz Glaser, Cansin Köktürk, and Charlotte Neuhäuser, were expelled from a Bundestag session when they held up the Palestinian flag.
