= Giersch =

Giersch is a German language surname. It stems from the female given name Gertrude – and may refer to:

- Alexis Giersch (born 1963), German politician
- Carlo Giersch (born 1937), German entrepreneur and merchant
- Herbert Giersch (1921–2010), German economist
