= Alaa Alhamwi =

German politician

Member of the Bundestag
- Incumbent
- Assumed office 25 March 2025
- Constituency: Lower Saxony

Personal details
- Born: 17 April 1984 (age 42) Damascus, Syria
- Party: Alliance 90/The Greens
- Education: University of Oldenburg
- Occupation: Researcher in Renewable Engineering and politician

Alaa Alhamwi (born 17 April 1984 in Damascus) is a Syrian-born German mechanical engineer and politician of the Alliance 90/The Greens. In the 2025 German federal election, he was elected to the German Bundestag.

== Early life and education ==
Alaa Alhamwi was born on 17 April 1984 in Damascus, Syria. In 2011 he left Syria and moved to Cairo. In 2012 he moved to Germany to obtain his Master's degree.

== Studies and professional career ==
In 2003, Alhamwi began his studies for a Bachelor's degree in Mechanical Engineering and Energy Technology at the University of Aleppo, Syria. Leaving his native country, he first pursued a dual Master of Science (M.Sc.) in Renewable Energy and Energy Efficiency for the Middle East and North Africa region (REMENA) at Cairo University in Egypt and later the University of Kassel,Germany, sponsored by a scholarship from the German Academic Exchange Service (DAAD).

After completing his Master's thesis, Alhamwi worked as a researcher in the field of energy system analysis at the German Aerospace Center (DLR). At this research centre and at the University of Oldenburg, he pursued his research in urban energy systems. In 2018, he received his doctorate in engineering from the University of Oldenburg. His doctoral thesis focused on the optimization of urban energy systems using geographic information systems (GIS) and open-source data. As part of his doctoral research, Alhamwi developed a model named FlexiGIS, an open-source GIS-based model for modeling energy systems and flexibility options in urban areas.

In addition to his later political activities, he has been working part-time as a postdoctoral researcher for the German Aerospace Center (DLR), conducting research in the field of energy systems analysis with a focus on the integration of green hydrogen into urban energy systems.

== Political career ==
In 2014, Alhamwi joined the Green Party (Alliance 90/The Greens) in Oldenburg. As part of his doctoral scholarship from the Heinrich Böll Foundation, he was active in various committees of this foundation. Starting in 2021, Alhamwi has been involved in local politics and has been member of the Oldenburg City Council. He won the direct mandate in his constituency and represents his party on the local government on the following committees: Urban Green Spaces, Environment and Climate (as chair), and Economic Development, Digitalization and International Cooperation. Further, he was appointed by the City Council and the EU Municipal Council to the EU Commission programme "Europe Begins at the Local Level". Alhamwi is a board member of the Europa-Union / European Federalists Oldenburg, a non-partisan and independent European citizens' movement that advocates for a federal Europe and the European integration process. He also sits on the supervisory board of the Oldenburg Technology and Start-up Center (TGO). In 2023, he ran for chairman of the Green Party in Lower Saxony and won the election. He became the first chairman of the Green Party in Lower Saxony with a migration background and served until 2025.

Alhamwi has been criticizing what he considers the excessive expansion of LNG terminals in Germany and is calling for a common, integrated European energy policy. He advocates for the use and promotion of geothermal energy and waste heat in conjunction with heat pumps. Further, he has advocated politically and scientifically for to the development of green hydrogen as a source of renewable energy.

In the 2025 federal election, Alhamwi ran for the direct mandate for the Oldenburg-Ammerland constituency and won a seat in the 21st Bundestag via his position on the Green party list. In this role, he is a member of the Committee on Economic Affairs and Energy and a substitute member of the Committee on Construction, where he also serves as committee secretary.

== Personal life ==
Alhamwi is married and has two children. He lives and works in Oldenburg, and his hobby is beekeeping.

== Publications ==
List of selected publications:

- Alaa Alhamwi et al.: GIS-based urban energy systems models and tools: Introducing a model for the optimisation of flexibilisation technologies in urban areas, Applied Energy, Volume 191, 1-9, doi:10.1016/j.apenergy.2017.01.048
- Alaa Alhamwi et al.: OpenStreetMap data in modelling the urban energy infrastructure: a first assessment and analysis, Energy Procedia, Volume 142, 1968–1976, doi:10.1016/j.egypro.2017.12.397
- Alaa Alhamwi, et al.: Modelling urban energy requirements using open source data and models, Applied Energy, Volume 231, 1100-1108, doi:10.1016/j.apenergy.2018.09.164
- Alaa Alhamwi et al.: Development of a GIS-based platform for the allocation and optimisation of distributed storage in urban energy systems, Applied Energy, Volume 251, 113360, doi:10.1016/j.apenergy.2019.113360
