= Sieghard Knodel =

German politician (born 1961)

Member of the Bundestag
- Incumbent
- Assumed office 25 March 2025
- Constituency: Baden-Württemberg

Personal details
- Born: 13 February 1961 (age 65)
- Party: Independent (since 2 May 2025)
- Other political affiliations: Alternative for Germany (until 2 May 2025)

Sieghard Knodel (born 13 February 1961) is a German politician who was elected as a member of the 21st Bundestag in the 2025 German federal election via the Alternative for Germany state list of Baden-Württemberg, position 18.

Knodel was the only of 152 AfD parliamentarians to leave party and faction after on 2 May 2025 the Federal Office for the Protection of the Constitution, (BfV) Germany's federal domestic intelligence agency, had classified the AfD as a "confirmed right-wing extremist" organisation. This classification was temporarily suspended by the BfV just a week after its announcement.

He is a master agricultural machinery mechanic with his own business, and stated he had to leave AfD after the BfV move to protect his business and family. He wants to continue as independent and has no intention of resigning from his seat. If so, his seat would automatically be filled by the next candidate on the 2025 AfD state list.
