= Sarah Vollath =

German politician (born 1995)

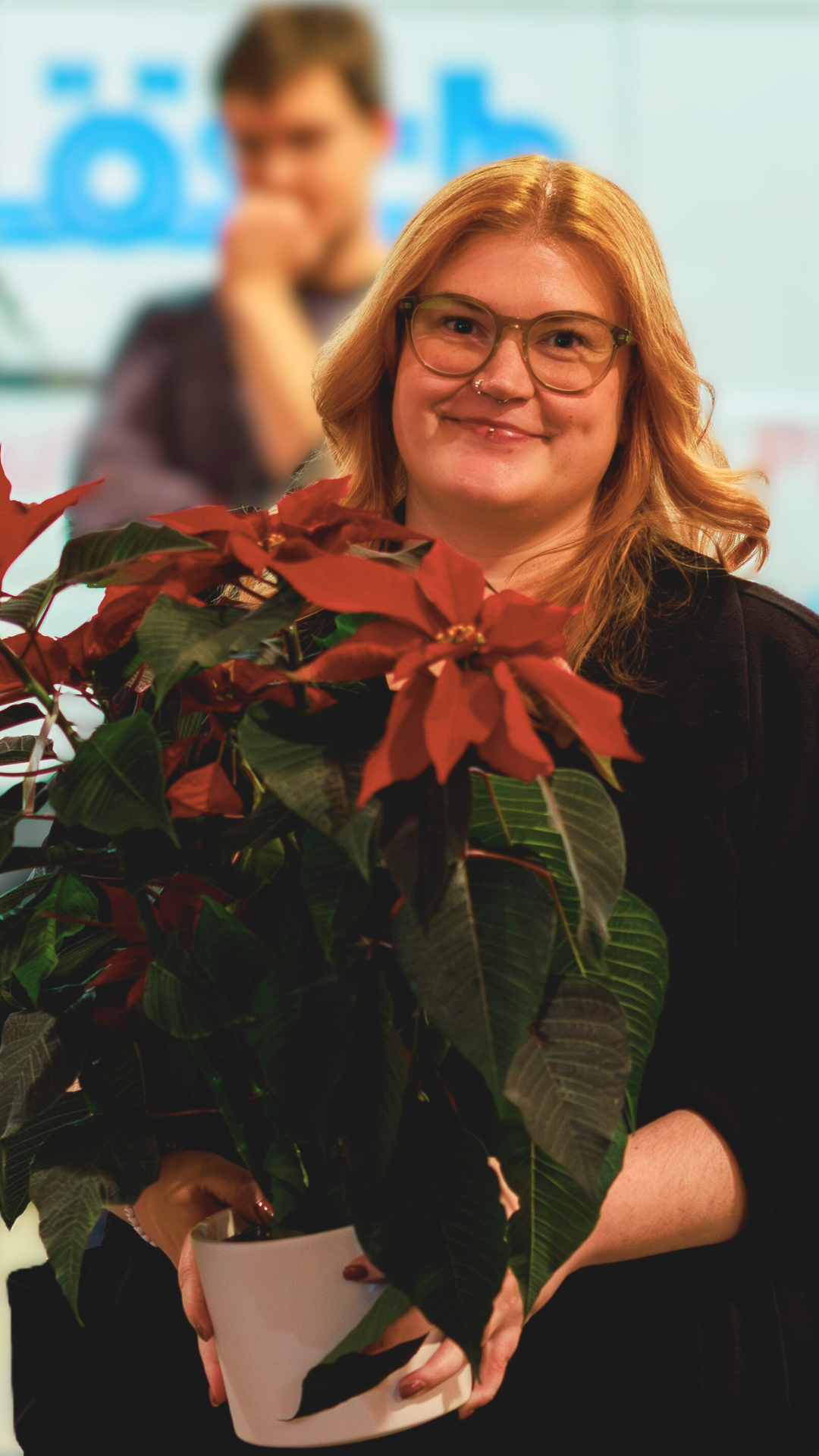
- Sarah Vollath in 2024

Member of the Bundestag
- Incumbent
- Assumed office 2025
- Constituency: Bavaria

Personal details
- Born: Sarah Eichberg; 26 December 1995 (age 30) Ingolstadt, Germany
- Party: Die Linke
- Education: Catholic University of Eichstätt-Ingolstadt

Sarah Vollath (née Eichberg; born 26 December 1995) is a German politician from Die Linke. She was elected a member of the German Bundestag since the 2025 German federal election.

== Life ==
=== Private and professional life ===
Vollath studied social work at the Catholic University of Eichstätt-Ingolstadt and, until taking up her Bundestag mandate, was head of an open all-day school in the Upper Bavarian district town of Eichstätt.

Sarah Vollath is married and lives in the Eichstätt district.

=== Political life ===
Vollath has been a member of the Left Party since 2018. She was the equal opportunities officer for the Bavarian Left Party. In 2024, she was elected to the executive board of the Bavarian Left Party. As third-place finisher on the Bavarian Left Party's state list, she was one of the 230 newly elected members of the 21st German Bundestag following the 2025 German federal election. She also ran as her party's direct candidate in the Ingolstadt constituency and received four percent of the first votes.

== Political positions ==
Her political priorities are women's, family, and education policy. She advocates for nationwide funding for women's shelters, basic child benefits, and a BAföG rate that is independent of parenthood and age. She also advocates for affordable housing and calls for a rent cap and the expropriation of property owners with a very large number of properties. Vollath opposes tightening of asylum laws and instead calls for better integration of migrant children through better funding for municipalities and schools. She also supports fairer tax policies and a fairer distribution of wealth.

== Other memberships ==
In addition to her membership in the Left Party, Vollath is also a member of the Education and Science Union and the Johanniter-Unfall-Hilfe.

== See also ==
- List of members of the 21st Bundestag
