= Boris Gamanov =

German politician (born 1986)

Member of the Bundestag
- Incumbent
- Assumed office 25 March 2025
- Constituency: Saarland

Personal details
- Born: 19 October 1986 (age 39) Riga, Latvian SSR
- Party: Alternative for Germany (since 2016)

Borislav Gamanov (born 19 October 1986), known as Boris Gamanov, is a Bulgarian-born German politician. He was elected as an Alternative for Germany (AfD) member of the Bundestag for Saarland in the 2025 election.

== Biography ==
Gamanov was born in Riga, Latvian Soviet Socialist Republic. He worked as a business administrator in the construction and manufacturing sectors prior to entering politics. He joined the AFD in 2016.

From 2017 to 2021, he served as treasurer of the Alternative for Germany in Saarbrücken. In the 2025 election, he was elected as an AFD member of the Bundestag for Saarland. As a member of the Bundestag, he defended the inclusion of Maximilian Krah and Matthias Helferich in the AFD parliamentary group amid a controversy about their ties to extreme right groups.
