= Victoria Broßart =

German politician (born 1992)

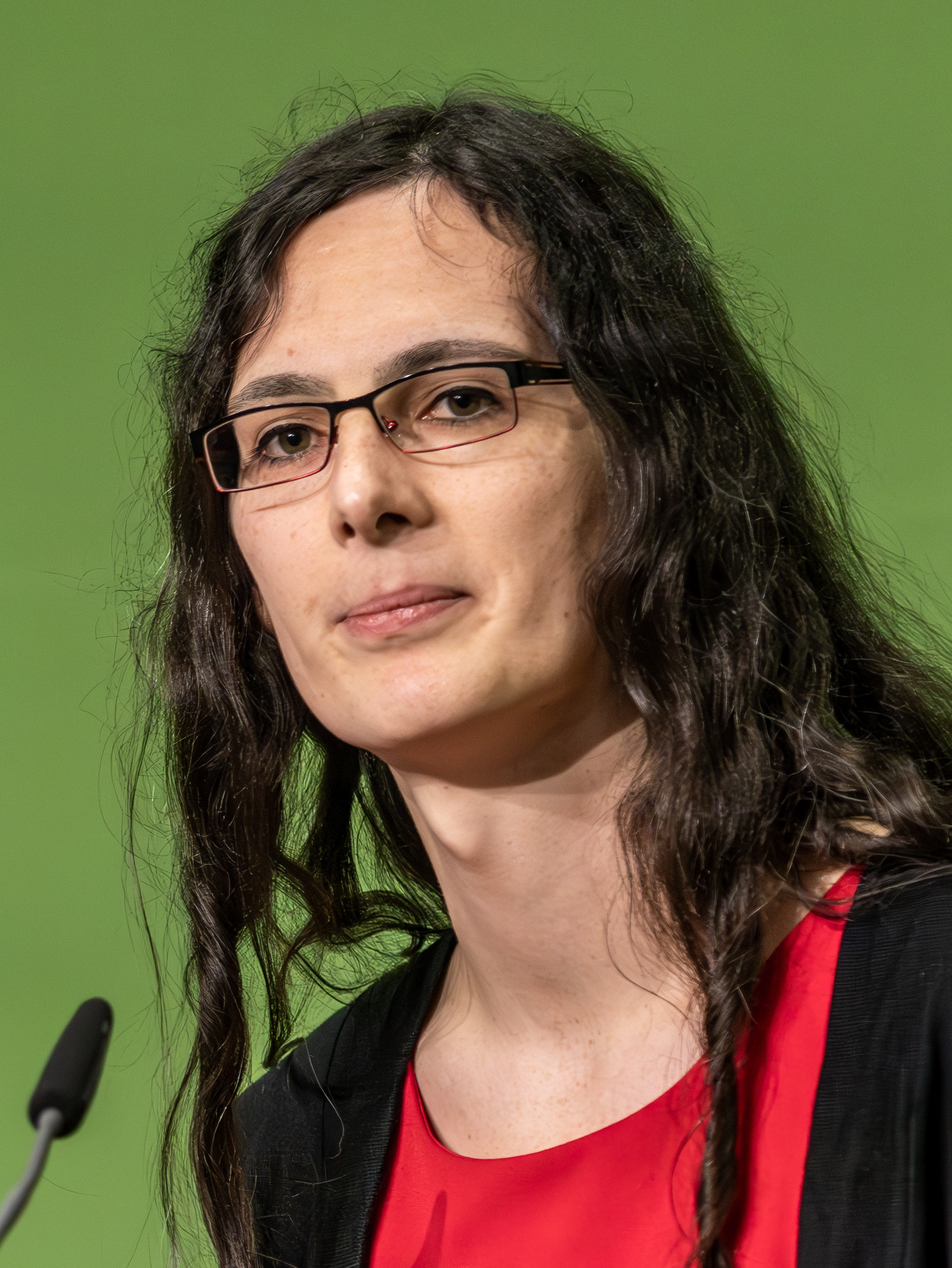
- Broßart in 2024

Member of the Bundestag for Rosenheim
- Incumbent
- Assumed office 23 February 2025

Personal details
- Born: 24 September 1992 (age 33) Karlsruhe, Germany
- Party: Alliance 90/The Greens
- Education: Baden-Württemberg Cooperative State University
- Website: Victoria Brossart MdB

Victoria Broßart (born 24 September 1992) is a German politician belonging to the Alliance 90/The Greens. In the 2025 German federal election, she was elected to the German Bundestag, making her the third openly transgender person elected to the German parliament after Nyke Slawik and Tessa Ganserer.

== Personal life ==
Broßart was born in Karlsruhe in 1992 and grew up in Rhineland-Palatinate. After graduating from high school, she studied electrical engineering and automation at the Baden-Württemberg Cooperative State University. Since 2014, she has lived and worked in Rosenheim, Bavaria. Today, she works as an engineer in special machine construction.

Broßart is transgender and married to Sahra Broßart. She is a trained lifeguard.

== Political career ==
Broßart has been a member of Alliance 90/The Greens since 2018 and was elected as an assessor of the party's state working group Queer.Grün.Bayern (literally "Queer.Green.Bavaria") in 2019. She has served as its spokesperson since 2020. She first ran for the Bundestag's Rosenheim constituency in the 2021 German federal election, coming in second place with 26,183 (13.8%) votes. She was also ranked 25th on the party's state list, but only the top 18 were elected. Broßart ran again in 2025, coming third in the constituency with 25,185 (12.6%) votes, but was ranked 13th on the list and was elected when the Greens earned 14 list seats total.

Her political focus is on transport policy, especially the expansion of public transport. In the 21st Bundestag, she is a full member of the Transport Committee and serves as its chair. She is also a deputy member of the Tourism Committee and the Digital and State Modernization Committee.
