= Zada Salihović =

German politician (born 2000)

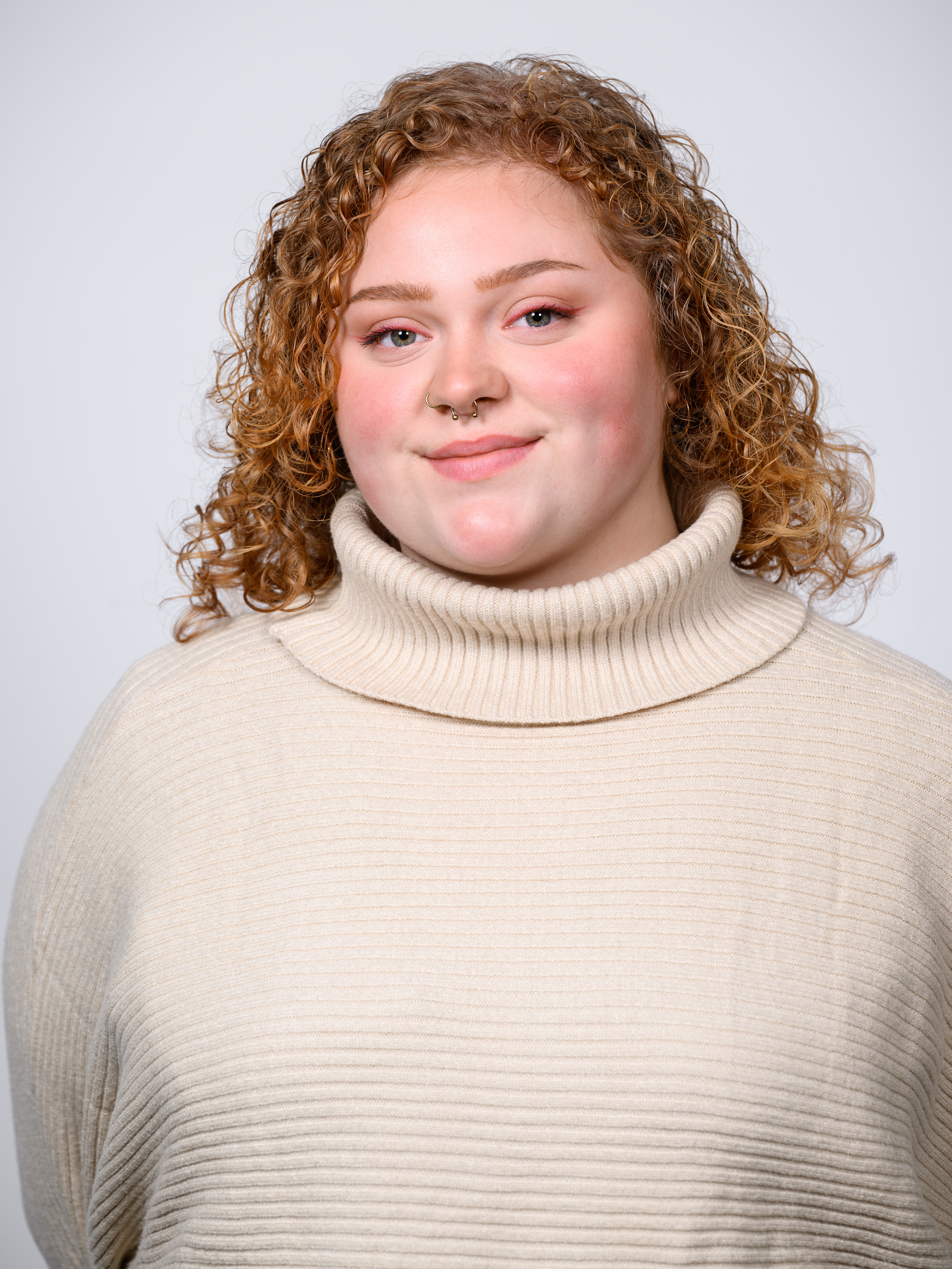
- Zada Salihovic in 2025

Member of the Bundestag for Saxony
- Incumbent
- Assumed office 2025

Personal details
- Born: 28 March 2000 (age 26) Pirna, Saxony, Germany
- Party: Die Linke

Zada Salihović (born 28 March 2000) is a German politician from The Left Party. She was elected as a Member of the German Bundestag in the 2025 German federal election. She is the fourth-youngest member of the 21st Bundestag.

== Life ==
Zada Salihović, the daughter of a Serb father and a Saxon mother, grew up in her hometown of Pirna. She played handball as a schoolgirl. She was introduced to politics by her older sister, took part in her first demonstration at the age of 14 – against Pegida – and was a youth and trainee representative at the age of 16. Initially working in nursing, she took up a job as a full-time trade unionist due to poor working conditions – a member of Ver.di Jugend (ver.di Youth) at the latest since April 2024. – She is a specialist in office management.

In October 2023, she joined the Left Party and won a seat in the 2025 German federal election as a supraregional candidate for Left Youth Solid, coming fourth on the Left's state list in Saxony. Salihović was supported by the Brand New Bundestag initiative and is a member of the Dresden Left Youth coordination group, the council of representatives of Linksjugend Sachsen, and the Dresden city executive committee. She is committed to feminist and anti-fascist activism and advocates for fair working conditions, equal opportunities policies, and the strengthening of rural areas.

== See also ==
- List of members of the 21st Bundestag
