= Daniel Walter =

German politician (born 1991)

Member of the Bundestag
- Incumbent
- Assumed office TBD
- Constituency: North Rhine-Westphalia

Personal details
- Born: 27 March 1991 (age 35)
- Party: Social Democratic Party

Daniel Walter (born 27 March 1991) is a German politician who was elected as a member of the Bundestag in 2025. He previously worked for Arndt Kohn and Dennis Rohde, and served as chief of staff to Claudia Moll.
