= Marcel Bauer =

German politician (born 1992)

Member of the Bundestag
- Incumbent
- Assumed office 2025
- Constituency: Baden-Württemberg

Personal details
- Born: 30 April 1992 (age 33) Mainburg, Germany
- Party: The Left

Marcel Karl Bernhard Bauer (born 30 April 1992) is a German politician and member of the Bundestag. A member of The Left, he has represented Baden-Württemberg since 2025.

Bauer was born on 30 April 1992 in Mainburg. He is a forester, certified nature and landscape conservationist and a member of the ver.di trade union. He has been on the executive committee of The Left's district branch in Karlsruhe since 2022 and state branch in Baden-Württemberg since 2023. He was The Left's candidate in Karlsruhe-Stadt (constituency 271) at the 2025 federal election but was not elected. He was however elected to the Bundestag on The Left's state list in Baden-Württemberg.

Bauer is married and has a daughter.
