= Joachim Bloch =

German politician (born 1963)

Member of the Bundestag
- Incumbent
- Assumed office 25 March 2025
- Constituency: Baden-Württemberg

Personal details
- Born: 2 August 1963 (age 62)
- Party: Alternative for Germany

Joachim Ralf Josef Bloch (born 2 August 1963) is a German politician who was elected as a member of the Bundestag in 2025. He has served as chairman of the Alternative for Germany in the district council of Tuttlingen since 2024.
