= David Gregosz =

German politician (born 1983)

Member of the Bundestag
- Incumbent
- Assumed office 25 March 2025
- Constituency: Thuringia

Personal details
- Born: 10 October 1983 (age 43)
- Party: Christian Democratic Union (since 2007)
- Education: Marburg University

David Gregosz (born 10 October 1983) is a German politician of the Christian Democratic Union (CDU) who was elected as a member of the Bundestag in 2025. From 2013 to 2025, he worked for the Konrad Adenauer Foundation.

== Political career ==
In 2024 Gregosz was nominated as the CDU candidate for the 2025 federal election in the electoral district Eichsfeld-Nordhausen-Kyffhäuserkreis in northern Thuringia. In the snap election in February 2025 he received 27,8% of the first vote, coming in second in his district. However, he was elected member of the German Bundestag as number 3 on list of the CDU Thuringia.

In parliament, Gregosz has been serving as a member of the Committee on Internal Affairs and the Committee on European Union Affairs.

== Other activities ==
- Rotary International, Member
