= Jan Feser =

German politician (born 1985)

Member of the Bundestag
- Incumbent
- Assumed office TBD
- Constituency: Hesse

Personal details
- Born: 1 March 1985 (age 41)
- Party: Alternative for Germany (since 2020)

Jan Hendrik Feser (born 1 March 1985) is a German politician who was elected as a member of the Bundestag in 2025. He has served as city councillor of Eltville since 2021.
