= Otto Strauß =

German politician

Member of the Bundestag
- Incumbent
- Assumed office 2025

Personal details
- Born: 19 February 1954 (age 72)
- Party: Alternative for Germany

Otto Strauß is a German politician who was elected as a member of the Bundestag in 2025 as a member of the Alternative for Germany.
