= Jeanne Dillschneider =

German politician (born 1995)

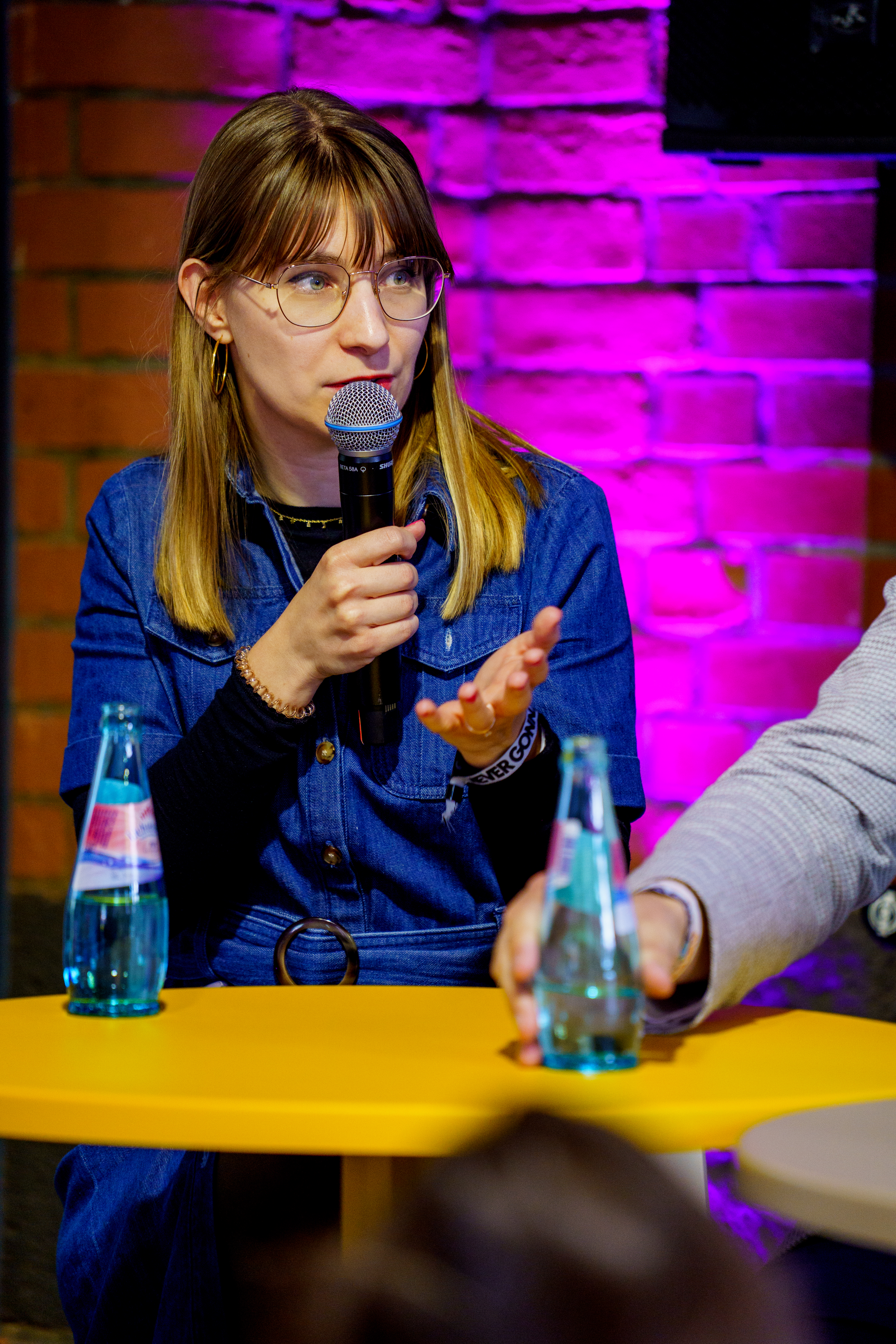
- Beatrice Rossmanith, 2026

Member of the Bundestag
- Incumbent
- Assumed office TBD
- Constituency: Saarland

Personal details
- Born: 27 December 1995 (age 30)
- Party: Alliance 90/The Greens

Jeanne Dillschneider (born 27 December 1995) is a German politician who was elected as a member of the Bundestag in 2025. She has been a member of the city council of Saarbrücken since 2019.
