= Mandy Eißing =

German politician

Member of the Bundestag
- Incumbent
- Assumed office 2025

Personal details
- Born: 31 August 1976 (age 49) Berlin
- Party: The Left

Mandy Eißing (August 31, 1976 in Altenburg) is a German politician belonging to the Left Party. In the 2025 German federal election, she was elected to the German Bundestag.
