= Peter Bohnhof =

German politician (born 1962)

Member of the Bundestag
- Incumbent
- Assumed office 25 March 2025
- Constituency: North Rhine-Westphalia

Personal details
- Born: 14 December 1962 (age 63)
- Party: Alternative for Germany (since 2013)

Peter Bohnhof (born 14 December 1962) is a German politician who was elected as a member of the Bundestag in 2025. He has been a member of the Alternative for Germany since 2013.
