= Daniel Zerbin =

German politician (born 1973)

Member of the Bundestag
- Incumbent
- Assumed office TBD
- Constituency: North Rhine-Westphalia

Member of the Landtag of North Rhine-Westphalia
- Incumbent
- Assumed office 1 June 2022

Personal details
- Born: 1 February 1973 (age 53)
- Party: Alternative for Germany

Daniel Zerbin (born 1 February 1973) is a German politician who was elected as a member of the Bundestag in 2025. He has been a member of the Landtag of North Rhine-Westphalia since 2022.
