= Alexis Giersch =

German politician

Member of the Bundestag from Schleswig-Holstein
- Incumbent
- Assumed office 2025

Personal details
- Born: 25 September 1963 (age 62) London
- Party: Alternative for Germany

Alexis Leonard Giersch (born 25 September 1963 in London) is a German politician for the AfD. He has been a member of the 21st Bundestag since March 2025.

Giersch is chairman of the AfD district association in Plön. In the 2021 federal election, he ran for a direct mandate in the Plön – Neumünster constituency and came fifth with 7.1% of the first vote. A year later, in the state elections in Schleswig-Holstein, Giersch ran in the Plön-Nord constituency and won 4.3% of the votes. The AfD failed to clear the five percent hurdle at the time and has not been represented in the Landtag of Schleswig-Holstein since. He ran for the 2025 federal election on the AfD Schleswig-Holstein state list.

The AfD won five seats in Schleswig-Holstein, however, after Volker Schnurrbusch gave up his Bundestag mandate in favor of a mandate in the European Parliament, Giersch took his place in the Bundestag.

== Political positions ==
According to his own statements, Giersch opposes a development in which "special interests can assert themselves through the power of money." In the context of the 2022 state elections, he stated that he would work to lower the barriers to direct democracy in Schleswig-Holstein.
