= Jörg Zirwes =

German politician (born 1968)

Member of the Bundestag
- Incumbent
- Assumed office 25 March 2025
- Constituency: Rhineland-Palatinate

Personal details
- Born: 20 March 1968 (age 58)
- Party: Alternative for Germany (since 2017)

Jörg Zirwes (born 20 March 1968) is a German politician who was elected as a member of the Bundestag in 2025. He has been a member of the Alternative for Germany since 2017.
