= Lars Haise =

German politician (born 1989)

Member of the Bundestag
- Incumbent
- Assumed office TBD
- Constituency: Baden-Württemberg

Personal details
- Born: 23 March 1989 (age 37)
- Party: Alternative for Germany

Lars Haise (born 23 March 1989) is a German politician who was as a elected member of the Bundestag in 2025. He has served as chairman of the Alternative for Germany in Rems-Murr-Kreis since 2022.
