= Jürgen Kögel =

German politician (born 1958)

Member of the Bundestag
- Incumbent
- Assumed office 25 March 2025
- Constituency: Baden-Württemberg

Personal details
- Born: 26 September 1958 (age 67)
- Party: Alternative for Germany

Jürgen Kögel (born 26 September 1958) is a German politician who was elected as a member of the Bundestag in 2025. He is a deputy leader of the Alternative for Germany in Baden-Württemberg.
