= Ronald Gläser =

German politician (born 1973)

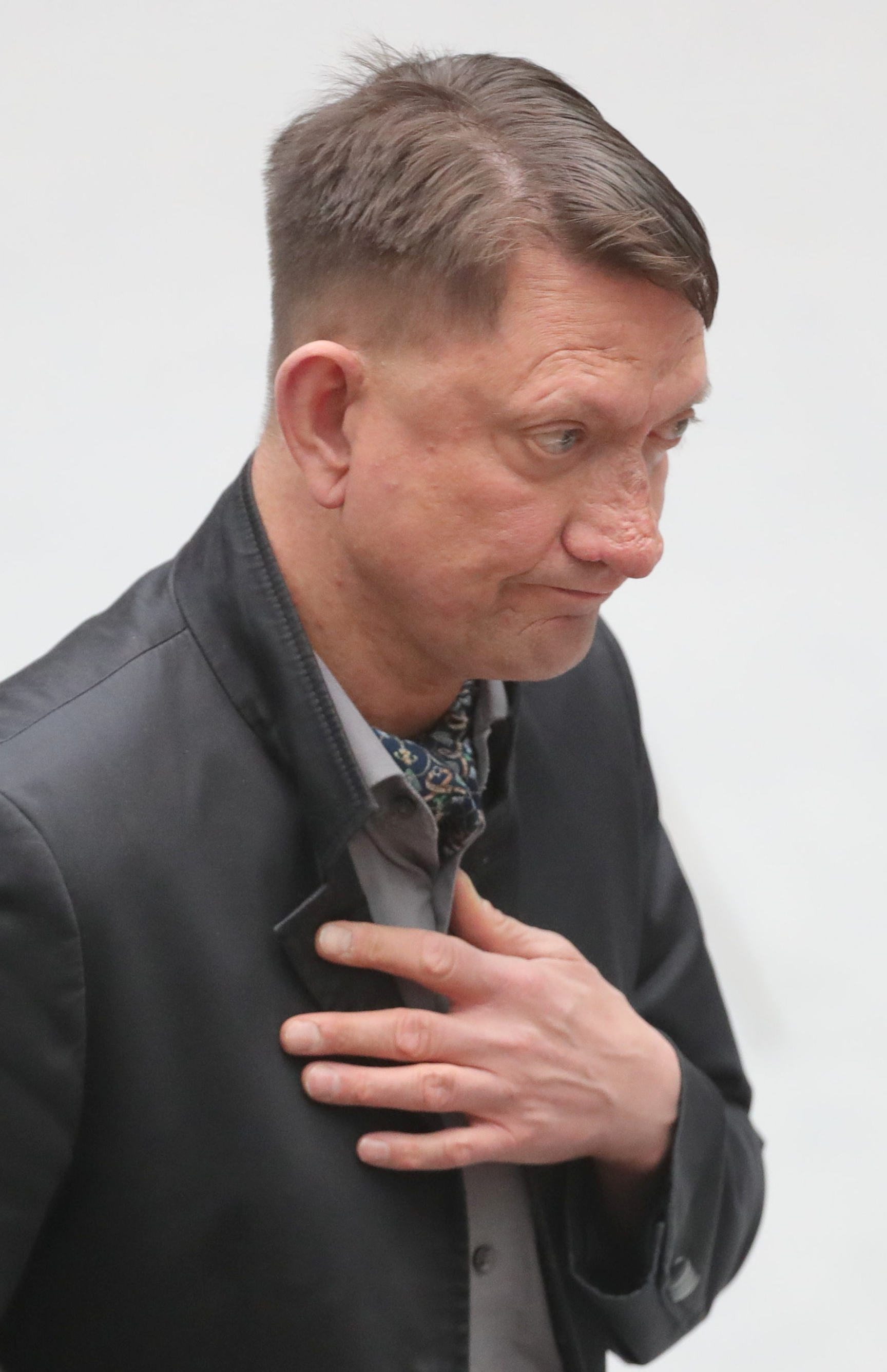

Member of the Bundestag
- Incumbent
- Assumed office March 2025

Member of the Abgeordnetenhaus of Berlin
- Incumbent
- Assumed office 28 October 2016

Personal details
- Born: 16 December 1973 (age 52)
- Party: Alternative for Germany (since 2013)
- Other political affiliations: Free Democratic Party (1991–2007)

Ronald Gläser (born 16 December 1973) is a German politician serving as a member of the Abgeordnetenhaus of Berlin since 2016. In the 2025 federal election, he was elected as a member of the Bundestag. Initially a member of the liberal Free Democratic Party, he joined the far right Alternative for Germany party in 2013.
