= Julian-Béla Joswig =

German politician

Member of the Bundestag
- Incumbent
- Assumed office 2025

Personal details
- Born: 14 October 1993 (age 32) Boppard
- Party: Alliance 90/The Greens

Julian-Béla Joswig (born 14 October 1993 in Boppard) is a German politician belonging to the Alliance 90/The Greens. In the 2025 German federal election, he was elected to the German Bundestag.
