= Tobias Ebenberger =

German politician (born 1990)

Member of the Bundestag
- Incumbent
- Assumed office TBD

Personal details
- Born: 1990 (age 35–36)
- Party: Alternative for Germany

Tobias Ebenberger (born 2 August 1990 in Gütersloh) is a German politician who was elected as a member of the Bundestag in 2025. He has served as a co-spokesperson of the Alternative for Germany in the Rhein-Sieg-Kreis since 2024. Ebenberger is married with a man.
