= Lorenz Gösta Beutin =

German politician (born 1978)

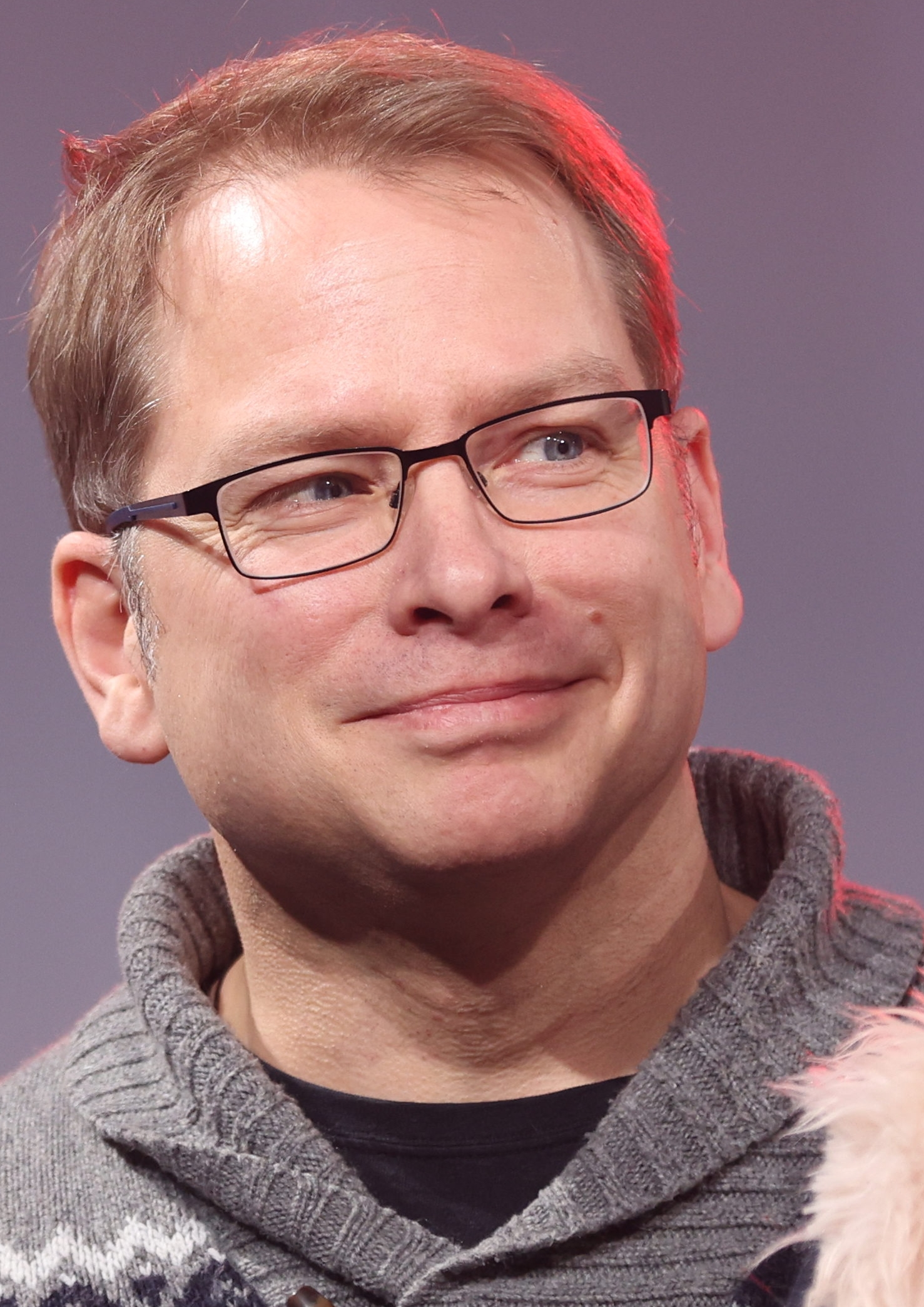
- Gösta Beutin in 2025

Member of the Bundestag
- In office 2017–2021
- Incumbent
- Assumed office 2025

Personal details
- Born: 18 July 1978 (age 47) Hamburg, West Germany (now Germany)
- Party: The Left

Lorenz Gösta Beutin (born 18 July 1978) is a German politician who represents The Left. He has served as a member of the Bundestag from the state of Schleswig-Holstein since 2025, before that from 2017 to 2021. Since May 2025 he is head of the parliaments committee on environment, protection of climate and nature and nuclear safety.

== Life ==
Beutin was born in Hamburg. In 1998 and 1999 he did his civilian service at the Protestant Academy Bad Segeberg. Since the 1999–2000 winter semester Beutin studied history, politics and German language and literature at the University of Hamburg. He completed it in 2008 with a master's thesis. As a historian he works on the history of National Socialism and anti-Semitism. He became a member of the Bundestag after the 2017 German federal election. He was a member of the Committee for Economics and Energy. He was spokesman for his parliamentary group on energy and climate policy.

He returned to the Bundestag in the 2025 German federal election. Since May 2025 he is head of the parliament's committee on environment, protection of climate and nature and nuclear safety.
