= Diana Herbstreuth =

German politician (born 1981)

- Diana Herbstreuth in 2025

Member of the Bundestag
- Incumbent
- Assumed office 25 March 2025
- Constituency: Thuringia

Personal details
- Born: 27 February 1981 (age 45)
- Party: Christian Democratic Union (since 2023)

Diana Herbstreuth (born 27 February 1981) is a German politician who was elected as a member of the Bundestag in 2025. She holds the rank of Oberstleutnant in the Bundeswehr.
