= Sascha Lensing =

German politician (born 1973)

Member of the Bundestag
- Incumbent
- Assumed office 25 March 2025
- Constituency: North Rhine-Westphalia

Personal details
- Born: 13 September 1973 (age 52) Duisburg
- Party: Alternative for Germany (since 2019)

Sascha Lensing (born 13 September 1973 in Duisburg) is a German politician who was elected as a member of the Bundestag in 2025. He has been a member of the Alternative for Germany since 2019.
