= Bernd Schattner =

German politician (born 1968)

Member of the Bundestag
- Incumbent
- Assumed office March 2025

Personal details
- Born: 1968 (age 57–58) Annweiler am Trifels
- Party: Alternative for Germany

Bernd Schattner (born 27 June 1968) is a German politician for the AfD and since 2021 member of the Bundestag, the federal diet.

== Life and politics ==
Schattner was born 1968 in the West German village of Annweiler am Trifels and became a salesman.

Schattner was elected to the Bundestag in 2021.
