= Kathrin Gebel =

German politician (born 1997)

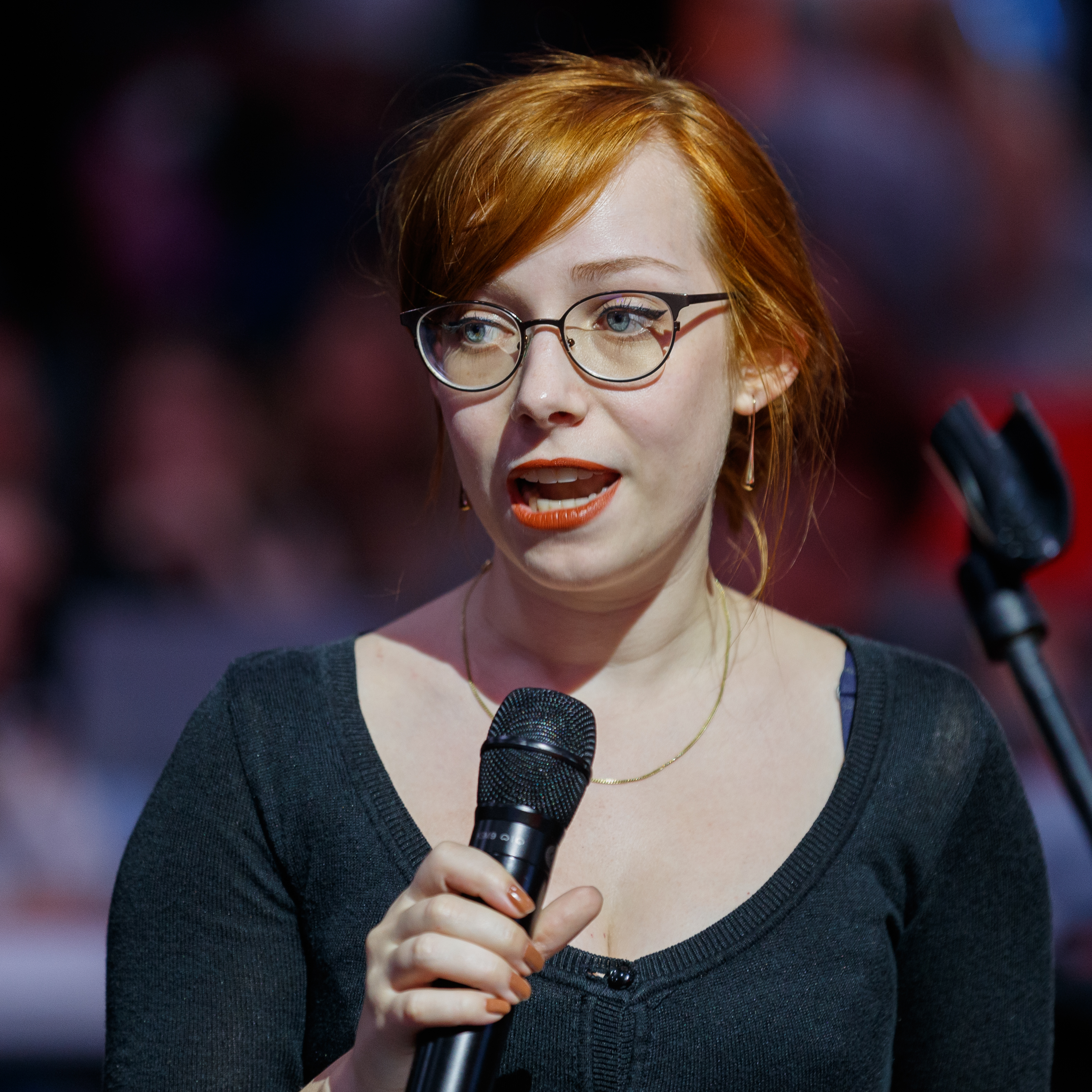

Member of the Bundestag
- Incumbent
- Assumed office 2025

Personal details
- Born: 5 April 1997 (age 29) Recklinghausen, North Rhine-Westphalia, Germany
- Party: Left Party

Kathrin Gebel (born 5 April 1997) is a German politician belonging to the Left Party. In the 2025 German federal election, she was elected to the German Bundestag.
