= Robin Jünger =

German politician (born 1996)

Member of the Bundestag
- Incumbent
- Assumed office March 2025

Personal details
- Born: 1996 (age 29–30)
- Party: Alternative for Germany (since 2015)

Robin Jünger (born 1996) is a German politician who was elected as a member of the Bundestag in 2025. He has been a member of the Alternative for Germany since 2015.
