= Niklas Wagener =

German politician (born 1998)

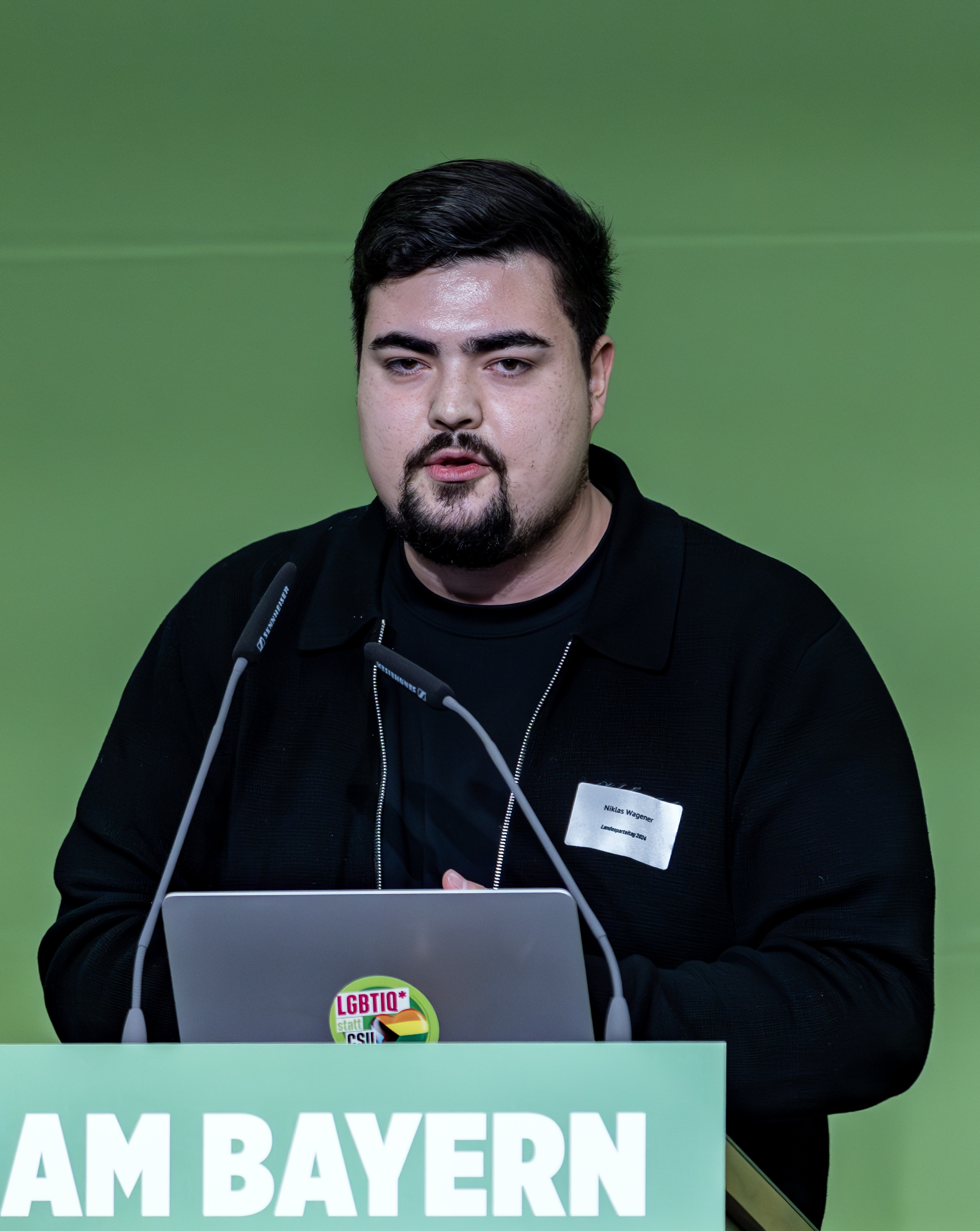
- Wagener in 2024

Member of the Bundestag
- Incumbent
- Assumed office 26 October 2021
- Constituency: Bavaria

Personal details
- Born: 16 April 1998 (age 28)
- Party: Alliance 90/The Greens

Niklas Wagener (born 16 April 1998) is a German politician. Wagener became a member of the Bundestag in the 2021 German federal election. He is affiliated with the Alliance 90/The Greens party.
