= Denis Pauli =

German politician (born 1978)

Member of the Bundestag
- Incumbent
- Assumed office 25 March 2025
- Constituency: North Rhine-Westphalia

Personal details
- Born: 25 September 1978 (age 47) Karaganda, Kazakhstan
- Party: Alternative for Germany

Denis Pauli (born 25 September 1978) is a German politician who was elected as a member of the Bundestag in 2025. He is a board member of the Alternative for Germany in Lippe, North Rhine-Westphalia.

== Biography ==
Pauli was born in Karaganda, Kazakhstan on 25 September 1978.
