= Achim Köhler =

German politician (born 1964)

Member of the Bundestag
- Incumbent
- Assumed office 25 March 2025
- Constituency: Baden-Württemberg

Personal details
- Born: 22 March 1964 (age 62)
- Party: Alternative for Germany (since 2013)

Achim Köhler (born 22 March 1964) is a German politician who was elected as a member of the Bundestag in 2025. He has been a member of the Alternative for Germany since 2013.
