= Anna Rathert =

German politician (born 1977)

Member of the Bundestag
- Incumbent
- Assumed office March 2025
- Constituency: North Rhine-Westphalia

Personal details
- Born: 29 April 1977 (age 48) Münster
- Party: Alternative for Germany

Anna Leonore Labitzke Rathert (born 29 April 1977 in Münster) is a German politician who was elected as a member of the Bundestag in 2025. She has served as deputy spokeswoman of the Alternative for Germany in Recklinghausen since 2024.
