= Christian Zaum =

German politician (born 1969)

Member of the Bundestag
- Incumbent
- Assumed office 25 March 2025
- Constituency: North Rhine-Westphalia

Personal details
- Born: 30 June 1969 (age 56)
- Party: Alternative for Germany (since 2018)

Christian Zaum (born 30 June 1969) is a German politician who was elected as a member of the Bundestag in 2025. He has been a member of the Alternative for Germany since 2018.
