= Sandra Stein =

German politician (born 1986)

Member of the Bundestag
- Incumbent
- Assumed office 2025

Personal details
- Born: 22 October 1986 (age 39)
- Party: Alliance 90/The Greens

Sandra Stein is a German politician belonging to the Alliance 90/The Greens. In the 2025 German federal election, she was elected to the German Bundestag.
