= Michael Blos =

German politician (born 1976)

Member of the Bundestag
- Incumbent
- Assumed office 25 March 2025
- Constituency: Baden-Württemberg

Personal details
- Born: 3 March 1976 (age 50)
- Party: Alternative for Germany (since 2017)

Michael Joachim Blos (born 3 March 1976) is a German politician who was elected as a member of the Bundestag in 2025. He has been a member of the Alternative for Germany since 2017.

== Life and education ==
Michael Blos grew up in the district of Karlsruhe and completed his Abitur at the Eichendorff-Gymnasium in Ettlingen in 1995. He subsequently studied geosciences and earned his doctorate at the University of Tübingen. After completing his doctorate, he worked as an environmental geologist for a major energy company. He later served for eight years under a fixed-term military contract in the Bundeswehr Geoinformation Service. After leaving the military with the rank of lieutenant colonel, he returned to the private sector.

Blos is married and has seven children.

== Politics ==
=== Political affiliation ===
Blos was a member from 2004 until 2015 at the Christian Democratic Union (CDU). In 2017 he joined the AfD and was elected into the local council in Ettlingen, where he remained active until a move to Rheinfelden in 2023. He was up for election as a candidate for the state parliament for Baden-Württemberg in 2021, representing his then state election district Ettlingen. During the municipal elections in 2024 he was elected into the district council in Lörrach, simultaneously he acquired a mandate in the district of Rheinfelden, which he forfeited after entering the Bundestag. From there on he was delegated into the Regional cooperation High Rhine - Lake Constance, as well as the Trinational Eurodistrict of Basel.

=== German Bundestag ===
In October 2024, Blos was nominated for the AfD's Baden-Württemberg state list and selected as the party's constituency candidate for Emmendingen–Lahr in the 2025 German federal election. In the election held in February 2025, he was elected to the Bundestag via the AfD's Baden-Württemberg state list, on which he held 14th position.

In the 21st German Bundestag, Blos serves as a full member of the Committee on the Environment, Climate Action, Nature Conservation and Nuclear Safety and as a substitute member of the Committee on Agriculture, Food and Regional Identity. He is also a full member of the Franco-German Parliamentary Assembly, a full member of the Committee for Cross-Border Cooperation (AGZ), and a substitute member of the Parliamentary Assembly of the Council of Europe.

== Political positions ==
Blos focuses in particular on environmental protection and nature conservation. During his election campaign, he also addressed economic and energy policy issues. In interviews, he emphasized the importance of nature conservation and noted that, in his view, his party still had untapped potential in this area.
