= Paul Schmidt (politician) =

German politician (born 1966)

Member of the Bundestag
- Incumbent
- Assumed office 25 March 2025
- Constituency: Baden-Württemberg

Personal details
- Born: 1966 (age 59–60)
- Party: Alternative for Germany (since 2013)

Paul Schmidt (born 1966) is a German politician. He currently serves as a member of the Bundestag for Baden-Württemberg, as a member of Alternative for Germany.

== Early life ==
Schmidt studied physics at the Technical University of Darmstadt, including two semesters at Syracuse University (SU), Syracuse, NY, USA, where he received a rowing scholarship. During his studies, he worked as a radiation worker in the laboratory. In 1988, he received his Bachelor-of-Science and in 1991 his Master-of-Science degree in Physics, both at Syracuse University. His first professional station was the former Karlsruhe Nuclear Research Center (now Forschungszentrum Karlsruhe).

In 1993, he accepted a doctoral position at the Justus Liebig University in Giessen, Hesse, Germany, at the chair of the biophysicist Prof. Dr. Jürgen Kiefer. He returned to Forschungszentrum Karlsruhe as a post-doc. At the Institute for Reactor Safety, he worked on the thermohydraulic design of a lead-cooled nuclear reactor. Then came the step into industry: As project coordinator at the Gesellschaft für Nuklear Service (GNS) in Essen, Schmidt was responsible for the development of fuel-assembly containers for energy suppliers in the USA and Italy.

In 2001, he began working at EnBW Kraftwerke AG in the department of "Fundamental Nuclear Issues" in Stuttgart and at the Philippsburg nuclear power plant (KKP).

== Politics ==
Schmidt has cited the support of the AfD for nuclear power as his reason for joining the party in 2013. In 2014, he was elected city councillor in Karlsruhe, later re-elected twice, and a regional councillor in the Middle Upper Rhine Regional Association. Since 2019 he has been the parliamentary-group chairman in both bodies.

In 2016 and 2021, Schmidt ran in the Karlsruhe I state parliament constituency, and in 2020 in the mayoral election in Karlsruhe. He ran in the 2025 German federal election on the AfD state list of Baden-Württemberg in 19th place, and was the final candidate elected from that list.

In September 2025, the AfD established a parliamentary working group on nuclear power on Schmidt's initiative, which he currently chairs. Schmidt is also a member of the Bundestag committee on the Environment, Climate Protection, Nature Conservation and Nuclear Safety.
