= Truels Reichardt =

German politician (born 1994)

Member of the Bundestag
- Incumbent
- Assumed office TBD
- Constituency: Schleswig-Holstein

Personal details
- Born: 5 June 1994 (age 31)
- Party: Social Democratic Party

Truels Reichardt (born 5 June 1994) is a German politician who was elected as a member of the Bundestag in 2025. He is the leader of the Social Democratic Party in the district council of Nordfriesland.
