= Charlotte Neuhäuser =

German politician (born 1998)

Member of the Bundestag from North Rhine-Westphalia
- Incumbent
- Assumed office 2025

Personal details
- Born: 25 November 1998 (age 27) Olpe, Germany
- Party: Die Linke
- Education: Paderborn University

Charlotte Antonia Neuhäuser (born 25 November 1998) is a German politician from Die Linke. She is the fourth-youngest member of the 21st German Bundestag, elected in the 2025 German federal election.

== Life ==
Charlotte Neuhäuser was born in Olpe and grew up in Eslohe. At the age of 13, she was named Sportswoman of the Year by the Eslohe Community Sports Association. She graduated from the Benedictine Gymnasium in Meschede in 2017. Neuhäuser is studying for a master's degree in Management at the University of Paderborn and is a research assistant with a bachelor's degree in the field of "Behavioural Economic Engineering and Responsible Management" at the Heinz Nixdorf Institute. She has six years of professional experience as a precariously employed postal worker. Originally, she was more involved in grassroots organizations, such as the local "Alliance against the Right" and the food bank. However, since she felt this didn't change anything, she joined the Left Party for the 2024 European Parliament election.

In the 2025 German federal election, she ran as the Left Party's direct candidate in the Paderborn constituency and won the fifth-largest share of first-past-the-post votes with 6.3%. The direct mandate went to General Secretary of the Christian Democratic Union (CDU) Carsten Linnemann, but Neuhäuser entered the Bundestag via 13th place on the North Rhine-Westphalia state list. She has since announced her commitment to education and labour market policy and her involvement in a committee

== See also ==
- List of members of the 21st Bundestag
