= Volker Schnurrbusch =

German politician (born 1958)

Member of the European Parliament for Germany
- Incumbent
- Assumed office 4 April 2025

Member of the Bundestag from Schleswig-Holstein
- In office 25 March 2025 – 4 April 2025

Member of the Landtag of Schleswig-Holstein
- In office 2017–2022

Personal details
- Born: 12 January 1958 (age 68) Leverkusen, North Rhine-Westphalia, West Germany
- Party: Alternative for Germany

Ralf Volker Schnurrbusch (born 12 January 1958) is a German politician of the Alternative for Germany (AfD) and a Member of the European Parliament since 2025. He was a member of the German Bundestag in 2025 and was previously a member of the Landtag of Schleswig-Holstein from 2017 to 2022.

== Life ==
Schnurrbusch graduated from high school in 1976 and then studied German studies, history and education at the Rhein-Westphalian Friedrich-Wilhelms University in Bonn. He completed his studies in education with the state examination for secondary level II. After his internship, he worked as a press officer or press spokesperson for media companies, as an editor in magazine publishing houses and as a member of the management in television production, as well as a freelance producer and author for television productions and industrial films.

Schnurrbusch is married and father of three children.

== Politics ==
Schnurrbusch joined the AfD in April 2013 and was on the board of the Stormarn district association from 2013 to 2016, most recently as deputy chairman. In 2015 he was elected first deputy state chairman of the AfD Schleswig-Holstein, and was re-elected in 2016. He is active in press work at the state level and in election campaign management at the federal and European level. In the 2017 Schleswig-Holstein state election, he was elected to the Landtag of Schleswig-Holstein as a member of parliament via the state list where he was 5th. Until his party lost its parliamentary group status in September 2020, he served as its Chief Whip.

On 20 July 2017, the Schleswig-Holstein state parliament lifted Schnurrbusch's parliamentary immunity. The police searched the MP's premises on suspicion of using symbols of unconstitutional organisations. An SA symbol was allegedly displayed on the AfD Schleswig-Holstein Facebook page, for which Schnurrbusch was regarded as legally responsible. The Kiel Regional Court ruled in June 2018 that the search of his office was unlawful.

In the 2022 Schleswig-Holstein state election, the AfD failed to be re-elected to the state parliament and Schnurrbusch left the state parliament at the end of the legislative period.

Schnurrbusch was elected to 16th place on the list as the AfD's candidate for the 2024 European elections at a European party conference in Magdeburg on 4 August 2023. However, he narrowly missed out on a place in the European Parliament, as the AfD, with 15.9%, was only allowed to send 15 representatives.

In the 2025 German federal election, Volker Schnurrbusch was elected to the Bundestag. He entered parliament via third place on the AfD Schleswig-Holstein state list, and he also ran in the Ostholstein – Stormarn-Nord constituency, where he came third with 17.3% of the vote. He gave his seat in Bundestag to Alexis Giersch, because Schnurrbusch received a seat in the European Parliament from Maximilian Krah's vacancy.

== Political positions ==
Schnurbusch lists his political positions on his party website. According to this, he wants to "fight" against a number of very different circumstances that he sees as a problem: against "political correctness: against bans on speaking and thinking!"; against "GEZ: down with the compulsory fee!" (meaning the ARD ZDF Deutschlandradio Beitragsservice); against "leveling"; against quotas, because "performance must be worth it!"; against "patronization", that history should be understood "from within itself"; "fight against multiculturalism", because every culture has "its place".
