= Johann Martel =

German politician (born 1979)

Member of the Bundestag
- Incumbent
- Assumed office 25 March 2025
- Constituency: Baden-Württemberg

Personal details
- Born: 16 February 1979 (age 47)
- Party: Alternative for Germany

Johann Martel (born 16 February 1979) is a German politician who was elected as a member of the Bundestag in 2025. He is the chairman of the Alternative for Germany in Neckar-Odenwald-Kreis.
