= Christian Douglas =

German politician (born 1978)

Member of the Bundestag
- Incumbent
- Assumed office 25 March 2025
- Constituency: Hesse

Personal details
- Born: 26 January 1978 (age 48) Nyköping, Sweden
- Party: Alternative for Germany (since 2014)

Christian Douglas (born 26 January 1978 in Nyköping, Sweden) is a German politician who was elected as a member of the Bundestag in 2025. He has been a member of the Alternative for Germany since 2014.
