= Nicole Hess =

German politician (born 1973)

Member of the Bundestag
- Incumbent
- Assumed office 25 March 2025
- Constituency: Hesse

Personal details
- Born: 22 July 1973 (age 52)
- Party: Alternative for Germany (since 2017)

Nicole Claudia Hess (born 22 July 1973) is a German politician who was elected as a member of the Bundestag in 2025. She has been a member of the Alternative for Germany since 2017.
