= Matthias Helferich =

German politician

Member of the Bundestag
- Incumbent
- Assumed office 26 October 2021
- Parliamentary group: Independent (2021–2025); AfD (since 2025)
- Constituency: North Rhine-Westphalia

Personal details
- Born: 14 October 1988 (age 38) Dortmund, West Germany
- Party: AfD (since 2016)
- Other political affiliations: Young Union (formerly)
- Education: Bonn University
- Occupation: Lawyer • Politician

Matthias Helferich (born 14 October 1988) is a German politician of the far-right Alternative for Germany party. He was a factionless member of the Bundestag between 2021 and 2025. In 2025, he was re-admitted to the AfD parliamentary group like the fellow controversial politician Maximilian Krah.

== Career ==
Helferich was born in 1988 in Dortmund, North Rhine-Westphalia, Germany. He served in the Bundeswehr in a guard unit (Wachbataillon) in Siegburg and began to study 2009 law at University Bonn.

Helferich was elected to the Bundestag in 2021. Although a party member of AfD, he never entered the party faction and is currently a factionless member of the Bundestag.

Within the AfD, Helferich is part of the ethnic-national wing under Björn Höcke.

In 2025, he was re-admitted back into the AfD faction.

== Political views ==
Helferich called himself a "democratic Freisler", referring to a Nazi-era judge. He later said that his statements were meant as parody: "If you are confronted with Nazi accusations as frequently as AfD politicians, you compensate for that in private spheres. You ridicule it."
