= Vinzenz Glaser =

German politician (born 1992)

Vinzenz Hans Glaser (born 1992 in Hildburghausen) is a German politician of the Left Party who was elected into the federal diet, the Bundestag, in 2025.

== Life ==
Born in Thuringia in 1992, Glaser has lived in St. Georgen, a borough of Freiburg since 2018.

After training as a state-recognised educator, he worked in various social institutions. At the same time, he studied Social Work at the Catholic University of Applied Sciences Freiburg. From the beginning of 2024 until his election to the German Bundestag, he worked as a social worker in child and youth work. His Master's degree in Peace Education at the Protestant University for Applied Sciences Freiburg is funded by a scholarship from the Rosa Luxemburg Foundation.

== Political work ==
Vinzenz Glaser's political involvement in the Left Party began in 2021.

Because a person gave a Nazi salute at an event of the far-right AfD party in Freiburg on 17 February 2025, the Left Party and its Freiburg direct candidate Vinzenz Glaser announced that they had filed a complaint over the incident. The police did not confirm whether one of the complainants was Glaser when asked.

In the 2025 Federal Election, Glaser received 10% of the first votes in the Freiburg electoral district and placed 5th. His party came fourth in the constituency with 13.9% of the second votes. Nevertheless, he entered the Bundestag by being fourth place on his party's state list in Baden-Württemberg. Alongside him, Chantal Kopf of the Greens who has won the electoral district since 2021 and Martina Kempf (AfD) through the state list also entered the Bundestag.

Before the election, Glaser prioritised the issue of peace. Without peace in Europe, he said, neither the climate issue nor economic and socio-political problems could be solved. After the election, he stated that, as an educator and social worker, he was interested in the Bundestag committees for labour and social affairs as well as for families, women, senior citizens and children. He also wanted to support his party in fighting for the rent cap.
