= Cansın Köktürk =

German politician (born 1993)

Member of the Bundestag
- Incumbent
- Assumed office 25 March 2025
- Constituency: North Rhine-Westphalia

Personal details
- Born: 13 June 1993 (age 33) Hattingen, Germany
- Party: The Left
- Education: University of Duisburg-Essen
- Occupation: Social worker
- Website: cansinkoektuerk.de

Cansın Köktürk (born 13 June 1993) is a German politician and member of the Bundestag. A member of The Left, she has represented North Rhine-Westphalia since March 2025.

Köktürk was born on 13 June 1993 in Hattingen and is of Turkish origin. She studied social work at the University of Duisburg-Essen. She worked as a social worker after graduating and was later a director of an emergency shelter for refugees, the homeless and people with addictions in Nordbad, Bochum. She worked in the youth welfare sector for many years, specialising in families in poverty. She later worked as a social worker in a school. She was also founder and chairperson of Medizinische Flüchtlingshilfe Bochum (Bochum Medical Refugee Aid), an outreach organisation for the homeless. In 2021 she was appointed Quartiersmanagerin (Neighborhood Manager) for the northern part of Bochum city centre.

Köktürk was a member of The Left in her youth but left due to disagreement with the political positions of party leader Sahra Wagenknecht. She joined the Alliance 90/The Greens in 2020 and was a member of the executive committee of the party's branch in Bochum and the party's state council in North Rhine-Westphalia. She tried to contest the 2022 North Rhine-Westphalia state election but her candidacy was rejected by the party. She left the party due to disagreements with party policies including some decisions taken by the traffic light coalition. She rejoined The Left in 2023 after Wagenknecht left the party. She was The Left's candidate in Bochum I (constituency 139) at the 2025 federal election but was not elected. She was however elected to the Bundestag on The Left's state list in North Rhine-Westphalia.

Köktürk is the author of Unsozialstaat Deutschland (Unwelfare State Germany) (Quadriga 2023 ISBN 9783869951287).
