= Uwe Foullong =

German politician (born 1957)

Member of the Bundestag
- Incumbent
- Assumed office 2025
- Constituency: North Rhine-Westphalia

Personal details
- Born: 29 September 1957 (age 69) Neuss, West Germany
- Party: The Left
- Education: Free University of Berlin
- Occupation: Trade unionist

Uwe Foullong (born 29 September 1957) is a German politician and member of the Bundestag. A member of The Left, he has represented North Rhine-Westphalia since 2025.

Foullong was born on 29 September 1957 in Neuss. He graduated from Alexander-von-Humboldt-Gymnasium, Neuss in 1978 and trained to be a bank clerk at the Bank für Gemeinwirtschaft (BfG) in Berlin from 1978 to 1980. He was a customer service representative at BfG Berlin from 1980 to 1981. He studied economics at Free University of Berlin from 1981 to 1987 on a scholarship from Hans-Böckler-Stiftung.

Foullong was the secretary of the Trade, Banking and Insurance Union (HBV)'s main board in 1987. He worked in the union's Department of Rationalization / Humanization of Work from 1987 to 1988. From 1988 to 2001 he held various roles in the union's activities in the banking sector. The HBV merged with other unions to form ver.di in 2001 since when Foullong has been head of the Co-ordination Department at ver.di. He was a member of the union's federal executive board from 2004 to 2011.

Foullong was a member of the Social Democratic Party of Germany from 1983 to 2017 before joining The Left in December 2023. He was The Left's candidate in Bottrop – Recklinghausen III (constituency 124) at the 2025 federal election but was not elected. He was however elected to the Bundestag on The Left's state list in North Rhine-Westphalia.

Foullong is married, has three children and lives in Bottrop-Kirchhellen.
