= Lower Saxony (Bundestag electoral district) =

Electoral district in Germany

- Niedersachsen
- Electoral District for the Bundestag
- Location of Lower Saxony within Germany
- State: Lower Saxony
- Population: 8,004,489 (2024)
- Electorate: 6,043,412 (2025)
- Area: 47,710 km^{2} (2022)

Current Electoral District
- Created: 1949
- Seats: List: – (2025–present) (Note: The number of seats allocated to the upper-tier state electoral districts is not fixed but is dependent on the national results at each election.); 59 (2013–2025); – (1957–2013); 66 (1953–1957); 58 (1949–1953)
- Members: List (Note: State-list members only.): Stephan Albani (CDU); Alaa Alhamwi (Grüne); Reza Asghari (CDU); Jorrit Bosch (Linke); Dirk Brandes (AfD); Anne-Mieke Bremer (Linke); Maik Brückner (Linke); Timon Dzienus (Grüne); Micha Fehre (AfD); Lena Gumnior (Grüne); Mirco Hanker (AfD); Stefan Henze (AfD); Olaf Hilmer (AfD); Cem Ince (Linke); Anne Janssen (CDU); Maren Kaminski (Linke); Rocco Kever (AfD); Jörn König (AfD); Tilman Kuban (CDU); Helge Limburg (Grüne); Danny Meiners (AfD); Swantje Michaelsen (Grüne); Carsten Müller (CDU); Karoline Otte (Grüne); Andreas Paul (AfD); Filiz Polat (Grüne); Marcel Queckemeyer (AfD); Heidi Reichinnek (Linke); Angela Rudzka (AfD); Martin Sichert (AfD); Svenja Stadler (SPD); Vivian Tauschwitz (CDU); Anja Troff-Schaffarzyk (SPD); Martina Uhr (AfD); Julia Verlinden (Grüne); Mareike Wulf (CDU)
- Constituencies: List: Aurich – Emden; Braunschweig; Celle – Uelzen; Cloppenburg - Vechta; Cuxhaven – Stade II; Delmenhorst – Wesermarsch – Oldenburg-Land; Diepholz – Nienburg I; Friesland – Wilhelmshaven – Wittmund; Gifhorn – Peine; Goslar – Northeim – Göttingen II; Göttingen; Hameln-Pyrmont – Holzminden; Hannover-Land I; Hannover-Land II; Harburg; Helmstedt – Wolfsburg; Hildesheim; Lüchow-Dannenberg – Lüneburg; Mittelems; Nienburg II – Schaumburg; Oldenburg - Ammerland; Osnabrück-Land; Osterholz – Verden; Rotenburg I - Heidekreis; Salzgitter - Wolfenbüttel; Stade I – Rotenburg II; Stadt Hannover I; Stadt Hannover II; Stadt Osnabrück; Unterems
- Created from: List: East Hanover; South Hanover–Braunschweig; Weser-Ems

Lower Saxony (German: Niedersachsen) is one of the 16 multi-member upper-tier state electoral districts of the Bundestag, one of the two national legislatures of Germany. The district was created in 1949 following the restoration of democracy in West Germany with the creation of the Federal Republic of Germany. It is conterminous with the state of Lower Saxony. At the 2025 federal election the constituency had 6,043,412 registered electors and elected 65 of the 630 members of the Bundestag. The district's members are elected using the mixed-member proportional representation electoral system and is currently divided into 30 lower-tier constituencies.

== Electoral system ==
Members of the Bundestag for Lower Saxony are elected using a complex mixed-member proportional representation electoral system that has evolved over time.

1949 Electoral Act
The Parliamentary Council of West Germany, a constituent assembly elected by Parliaments of the eleven states of West Germany, could not agree upon the electoral law to be included in the Basic Law, the constitution of the nascent nation. The Council instead established a special committee to draft an electoral law for the first federal election. In February 1949 the Council adopted an electoral law which would establish a mixed electoral system with 50% of seats elected using the first-past-the-post system and the other 50% via federal lists, and there would no electoral threshold. The Allied-occupying authorities objected to the new electoral as they considered that the Parliamentary Council was not competent to enact electoral law and only the states could do so. The minister presidents of the states referred the issue back to the Parliamentary Council which passed another electoral law on 10 May 1949 with a two-thirds majority. The Allied military governors objected to several parts of the new law and ordered changes to be made. In response, the minister presidents promulgated an amended electoral law on 15 June 1949, the "Electoral Act for the first Bundestag and the first Federal Assembly of the Federal Republic of Germany" (Wahlgesetz zum ersten Bundestag und zur ersten Bundesversammlung der Bundesrepublik Deutschland). On 5 August 1949 the minister presidents promulgated an amendment to the electoral law in relation to method of calculating the seat allocation in the upper-tier electoral districts.

The amended law provided for 400 members of the Bundestag of which 58 would be elected from Lower Saxony. Each state government was to distribute the seats in their respective states with 60% of seats being allocated to constituency seats or direct mandates (Direktmandat) elected from lower-tier single-member constituencies with the remaining 40% of seats being state seats allocated to state lists (Landesliste or Landeswahlvorschlag) elected from upper-tier multi-member electoral districts. In the lower-tier constituencies the candidate with the most votes was elected (plurality voting). In order to calculate the state seats won by each party, the total seats allocated to each state, excluding constituency seats won by independents and parties that did not submit a state-list nomination, were distributed to parties using the D'Hondt method. Only parties that had received at least 5% of the votes in the state or had won at least one constituency seat in the state (the basic mandate clause Grundmandatsklausel) were included in this calculation. Then the number of constituency seats won by the party in the state were deducted to determine the number of state seats won by each party. If the number of constituency seats won by a party exceeded the calculated number of seats it was entitled to in the state, it was permitted to retain the overhang seats (Überhangmandat). Finally, the state seats won by each party were distributed amongst its candidates in the order they appeared on the state list (closed list).

Vacancies in constituency seats were filled by by-elections until January 1953 when an amendment to the electoral law abolished by-elections and instead vacancies were filled from the party's state list.

1953 Electoral Act
In July 1953 a new electoral law, the "Electoral Act for the Second Bundestag and the Federal Assembly" (Wahlgesetz zum zweiten Bundestag und zur Bundesversammlung), was enacted. The new law provided for 484 members of the Bundestag of which 66 would be elected from Lower Saxony. The split between constituency seats and state seats was changed from 60:40 to 50:50 as the Parliamentary Council had envisaged in 1949. Voters had two votes instead of one - with their first vote (Erststimme) they chose a candidate in the lower-tier constituency and with their second vote (Zweitstimme) they chose a state list in the upper-tier electoral district. Split-ticket voting (panachage) was permitted. The two thresholds required to compete for state seats were transferred from the state level to the national level. Parties representing recognised national minorities (Nationale Minderheit) were exempt from the threshold requirements.

1956 Electoral Act
The "Bundeswahlgesetz" (Federal Election Act) enacted in May 1956 was the first permanent electoral law in post-war West Germany (the 1949 and 1953 Acts were provisional and only applied to the subsequent federal election). In December 1956 the Act was amended in relation to size of the Bundestag following the accession of Saarland to the federal republic. The Bundestag was to have 494 members (excluding the 22 non-voting members from West Berlin) but, unlike the previous Acts, seats weren't allocated to individual states which in effect meant seats were distributed amongst participating parties based on the national vote rather than on the state vote as previously. The requirement to have won at least one constituency seat nationally to compete for state seats was increased to at least three constituency seats nationally. The 5% threshold and exemption for parties representing recognised national minorities remained as previously.

The calculation of the number of state seats won by each party was carried out in three stages. Firstly, the total number of Bundestag seats - excluding constituency seats won by independents, parties that did not submit a state-list nomination and parties that did not meet the threshold requirements - were allocated amongst parties that met the threshold requirements based on their national total of second votes and using the D'Hondt method. Secondly, the seats allocated to each party was distributed to the upper-tier electoral district level based on their state total of second votes and using the D'Hondt method. Finally, the constituency seats won by the party in the state were deducted to determine the number of state seats won by each party. Parties retained overhang seats as previously.

In February 1964 the Act was amended to increase the size of the Bundestag from 494 to 496.

1975 Electoral Act
A new version of the Act was enacted in September 1975 but made no changes to electoral system. The method for allocating state seats was changed from D'Hondt to the largest remainder method with Hare quota in March 1985.

In June 1990 the Act was amended to allow the accession of the East German states into the federal republic, increasing the size of the Bundestag from 496 to 656. The Federal Constitutional Court ruled in September 1990 that the 5% national threshold violated the principle of equal voting rights as political parties from East Germany needed to increase their votes by a relatively larger amount than parties from West Germany in order to meet the threshold in a unified Germany. In response, the electoral law was amended in October 1990 to have separate 5% thresholds for East and West Germany and passing either one would allow the party to compete for upper-tier electoral district seats in the whole of Germany. This change was transitional and only applied to the subsequent election.

1993 Electoral Act
A new version of the Act was enacted in July 1993 but made no changes to electoral system. In November 1996 the Act was amended to decrease the size of the Bundestag from 656 to 598 but this change wasn't applied until the 2002 federal election. The method for allocating state seats was changed from largest remainder to the Sainte-Laguë method (also known as the Schepers method) in March 2008.

The existence of overhang seats at state level together with seats being allocated initially at the national level led to the possibility of negative vote weight - the more second votes a party received in a state in which it had overhang seats, the fewer overall seats it would end up receiving. The Federal Constitutional Court ruled in July 1998 that this violated the princicple of equal votes enshrined in the Basic Law. In response, the Act was amended in December 2011 but in July 2012 the Constitutional Court ruled this too violated the Basic Law as it still raised the possibility of negative vote weight. The Act was amended again in May 2013 to meet the Constitutional Court's ruling. The main changes were that the seats were allocated initially based on second votes at the state level rather than on the national level, and the introduction levelling seats (Ausgleichsmandat) to ensure that the final overall seat allocation was proportional to the second votes. The threshold limits and the method of electing lower-tier constituency seats remained unchanged.

The calculation of the state seats won by each party was carried out in multiple, circular stages. Firstly, the total number of seats in the Bundestag (598) was distributed amongst the upper-tier electoral districts based on their population of German citizens. Secondly, the total seats allocated to each upper-tier electoral district - excluding seats won at the lower-tier constituency level by independents, parties that did not submit a state-list nomination and parties that did not meet the threshold requirements - were allocated amongst parties that met the national threshold requirements based on their total second votes in the state and using the Sainte-Laguë method. Then the number of constituency seats won by the party in the state were deducted to determine the initial allocation of state seats won by each party. Parties retained overhang seats as previously. Each party's minimum seat entitlement was the sum of the initial allocation of state seats plus the number of constituency seats won by the party, including overhang seats. Next, the ratio of second votes to minimum seat entitlement was calculated for each party. Then, each party's second votes total was divided by the lowest of these ratios to determine the final national seat allocation. The difference between the final national seat allocation and the minimum seat entitlement was the number of levelling seats. The final national allocation was then distributed to the upper-tier electoral district level based on the number of second votes received by that party in each state but ensuring that each party received at least as many seats as the number of constituency seats the party won in the state. Finally, the number of constituency seats won by the party in the state were deducted to determine the final allocation of state seats won by each party. This final allocation of state seats could be lower than the initial allocation. One new clause in the Act was that if a party received more than half of the total number of second votes received by parties that met the threshold requirements, but did not receive more than half of the seats, additional seats were to be allocated to that party, using the same top-down method as above, until it received one seat more than half of the total number of seats in the Bundestag.

The existence overhang seats plus changes in the party system in Germany meant more and more levelling seats were required to achieve proportionality. In order to mitigate this, the Act was amended in November 2020 so that any overhang seats in excess of three for a party in a state would be off-set by a commensurate reduction in the party's state seats in other states. At the 2021 federal election the Christian Social Union received 12 overhang mandates in Bavaria but, as it only competed in that state, its nine excess overhang seats could not be off-set by a reductions in state seats elsewhere and as result 104 levelling seats were needed to achieve proportionality. This, together with a total 34 overhang seats, took the size of the Bundestag to 736, the largest in the democratic world.

The Act was amended in June 2023 to eliminate overhang seats, and therefore the need for levelling seats. The size of the Bundestag was increased from 598 to 630 whilst the basic mandate clause was abolished. The latter change was challenged in the Constitutional Court which ruled on 30 July 2024 that the 5% threshold without any exceptions was unconstitutional and ordered the reinstatement of the basic mandate clause on an interim basis. The calculation of the number of state seats won by each party was similar to the process used prior to the 2013 reform, with the exception that if a party won more constituency seats in a state than it was entitled to, its constituency winners were excluded from the Bundestag in decreasing order of their first vote share.

== Constituencies ==
=== Current ===
Lower Saxony is currently divided into 30 lower-tier constituencies:

- 24. Aurich – Emden
- 25. Unterems
- 26. Friesland – Wilhelmshaven – Wittmund
- 27. Oldenburg - Ammerland
- 28. Delmenhorst – Wesermarsch – Oldenburg-Land
- 29. Cuxhaven – Stade II
- 30. Stade I – Rotenburg II
- 31. Mittelems
- 32. Cloppenburg - Vechta
- 33. Diepholz – Nienburg I
- 34. Osterholz – Verden
- 35. Rotenburg I - Heidekreis
- 36. Harburg
- 37. Lüchow-Dannenberg – Lüneburg
- 38. Osnabrück-Land
- 39. Stadt Osnabrück
- 40. Nienburg II – Schaumburg
- 41. Stadt Hannover I
- 42. Stadt Hannover II
- 43. Hannover-Land I
- 44. Celle – Uelzen
- 45. Gifhorn – Peine
- 46. Hameln-Pyrmont – Holzminden
- 47. Hannover-Land II
- 48. Hildesheim
- 49. Salzgitter - Wolfenbüttel
- 50. Braunschweig
- 51. Helmstedt – Wolfsburg
- 52. Goslar – Northeim – Göttingen II
- 53. Göttingen

=== Former ===
- Cuxhaven
- Cuxhaven – Osterholz
- Emden – Leer
- Emsland
- Fallingbostel – Hoya
- Goslar
- Harburg – Soltau
- Holzminden
- Leer
- Lingen
- Neustadt – GrafschaftSchaumburg
- Rotenburg – Verden
- Soltau-Fallingbostel – Winsen L.
- Stade – Cuxhaven
- Stade – RotenburgI
- Uelzen
- Wolfenbüttel – Goslar-Land

== Election results ==
=== Summary ===
Election	Communists DKP / KPD			Left Linke / PDS			Social Democrats SPD			Greens Grüne / AUD			Free Democrats FDP			Christian Democrats CDU			All-German GDP / DP			Alternative AfD			National Democrats NPD / DRP		
Election	Votes	%	Seats	Votes	%	Seats	Votes	%	Seats	Votes	%	Seats	Votes	%	Seats	Votes	%	Seats	Votes	%	Seats	Votes	%	Seats	Votes	%	Seats
2025				405,519	8.09%	6	1,153,523	23.00%	17	576,845	11.50%	8	205,163	4.09%	0	1,410,418	28.12%	21				894,540	17.84%	13			
2021	1,020	0.02%	0	148,657	3.29%	3	1,498,500	33.13%	26	726,613	16.06%	13	474,638	10.49%	8	1,093,579	24.18%	18				336,434	7.44%	6	4,379	0.10%	0
2017	1,100	0.02%	0	322,979	6.95%	5	1,275,172	27.44%	20	404,825	8.71%	6	431,405	9.28%	7	1,623,481	34.94%	21				422,362	9.09%	7	12,034	0.26%	0
2013				223,935	5.04%	4	1,470,005	33.07%	25	391,901	8.82%	6	185,647	4.18%	0	1,825,592	41.07%	31				165,875	3.73%	0	37,415	0.84%	0
2009				380,373	8.58%	6	1,297,940	29.28%	19	475,742	10.73%	7	588,401	13.27%	9	1,471,530	33.20%	21							53,909	1.22%	0
2005				205,200	4.30%	3	2,058,174	43.17%	27	354,853	7.44%	5	426,341	8.94%	6	1,599,947	33.56%	21							59,744	1.25%	0
2002				50,380	1.04%	0	2,318,625	47.84%	31	353,644	7.30%	5	342,990	7.08%	5	1,673,495	34.53%	22							12,905	0.27%	0
1998				50,068	1.01%	1	2,446,945	49.41%	35	292,799	5.91%	4	314,503	6.35%	4	1,689,953	34.13%	24							6,823	0.14%	0
1994				46,731	0.98%	1	1,938,321	40.57%	28	338,087	7.08%	5	368,180	7.71%	5	1,971,664	41.27%	28									
1990				14,654	0.32%	0	1,765,928	38.36%	27	205,449	4.46%	0	474,609	10.31%	7	2,039,668	44.31%	31							12,747	0.28%	0
1987							1,967,443	41.44%	26	353,721	7.45%	5	419,882	8.84%	6	1,969,967	41.49%	26							21,984	0.46%	0
1983	6,361	0.13%	0				2,015,731	41.35%	26	278,597	5.72%	4	338,416	6.94%	4	2,223,988	45.62%	29							9,864	0.20%	0
1980	7,020	0.15%	0				2,232,531	46.95%	30	77,475	1.63%	0	535,914	11.27%	7	1,891,813	39.78%	26							7,107	0.15%	0
1976	11,232	0.24%	0				2,129,502	45.71%	29				369,526	7.93%	5	2,129,143	45.70%	28							12,134	0.26%	0
1972	9,467	0.20%	0				2,235,911	48.06%	30				393,282	8.45%	5	1,988,720	42.75%	27							22,907	0.49%	0
1969							1,797,376	43.78%	29				230,471	5.61%	4	1,854,514	45.17%	30	9,732	0.24%	0				188,272	4.59%	0
1965							1,614,540	39.84%	26	5,460	0.13%	0	440,860	10.88%	7	1,855,124	45.77%	29							102,470	2.53%	0
1961							1,526,824	38.72%	25				519,139	13.17%	9	1,536,956	38.98%	26	242,219	6.14%	0				63,251	1.60%	0
1957							1,255,204	32.80%	22				226,463	5.92%	4	1,495,343	39.08%	27	435,936	11.39%	8				88,963	2.32%	0
1953	40,091	1.06%	0				1,136,522	30.06%	21				260,894	6.90%	5	1,330,982	35.21%	25	449,203	11.88%	8				132,057	3.49%	0
1949	104,132	3.09%	0				1,125,295	33.43%	24				252,141	7.49%	5	593,691	17.64%	12	597,542	17.75%	12				273,129	8.11%	5

=== Detailed ===
Party has received at least 5% of the vote nationally or won three (Note: One seat at the 1953 election.) seats at the lower-tier constituency level and is entitled to compete for seats at the upper-tier state level.
Party represents a recognised minority and is entitled to compete for seats at the upper-tier state level.

==== 2020s ====
===== 2025 =====
Results of the 2025 federal election held on 23 February 2025:

Party		Second votes per region				Total votes	%	Seats				
Party		Braun- schweig	Hanover	Lüne- burg	Weser -Ems	Total votes	%	Constituency			Stat.	Tot.
Party		Braun- schweig	Hanover	Lüne- burg	Weser -Ems	Total votes	%	Win.	For.	Ele.	Stat.	Tot.
Christian Democratic Union of Germany	CDU	257,924	346,548	324,098	481,848	1,410,418	28.12%	15	0	15	6	21
Social Democratic Party of Germany	SPD	230,462	309,704	250,432	362,925	1,153,523	23.00%	15	0	15	2	17
Alternative for Germany	AfD	182,939	223,283	207,846	280,472	894,540	17.84%	0	0	0	13	13
Alliance 90/The Greens	Grüne	113,059	170,214	131,044	162,528	576,845	11.50%	0	0	0	8	8
Die Linke	Linke	82,664	115,814	83,390	123,651	405,519	8.09%	0	0	0	6	6
Free Democratic Party	FDP	37,420	54,024	46,192	67,527	205,163	4.09%	0	0	0	0	0
Sahra Wagenknecht Alliance	BSW	38,834	50,864	41,034	58,644	189,376	3.78%	0	0	0	0	0
Human Environment Animal Protection Party		11,920	15,338	13,581	17,268	58,107	1.16%	0	0	0	0	0
Free Voters	FW	6,489	9,190	9,799	12,150	37,628	0.75%	0	0	0	0	0
Volt Germany	Volt	6,656	7,684	7,793	8,355	30,488	0.61%	0	0	0	0	0
Die PARTEI		4,629	5,787	5,059	6,885	22,360	0.45%	0	0	0	0	0
Grassroots Democratic Party of Germany	dieBasis	2,576	2,813	3,261	3,816	12,466	0.25%	0	0	0	0	0
Pirate Party Germany	Piraten	1,645	2,363	1,765	2,256	8,029	0.16%	0	0	0	0	0
Bündnis Deutschland	BD	1,326	1,616	1,347	2,001	6,290	0.13%	0	0	0	0	0
Party of Humanists	PdH	719	946	674	1,003	3,342	0.07%	0	0	0	0	0
Marxist–Leninist Party of Germany	MLPD	327	380	202	333	1,242	0.02%	0	0	0	0	0
Valid votes		979,589	1,316,568	1,127,517	1,591,662	5,015,336	100.00%	30	0	30	35	65
Rejected votes		5,542	6,936	5,351	8,147	25,976	0.52%					
Total polled		985,131	1,323,504	1,132,868	1,599,809	5,041,312	83.42%					
Registered electors		1,189,904	1,588,374	1,346,955	1,918,179	6,043,412						
Turnout		82.79%	83.32%	84.11%	83.40%	83.42%						

The following candidates were elected:

- State seats - Stephan Albani (CDU); Alaa Alhamwi (Grüne); Jorrit Bosch (Linke); Dirk Brandes (AfD); Anne-Mieke Bremer (Linke); Maik Brückner (Linke); Timon Dzienus (Grüne); Micha Fehre (AfD); Lena Gumnior (Grüne); Mirco Hanker (AfD); Stefan Henze (AfD); Olaf Hilmer (AfD); Cem Ince (Linke); Anne Janssen (CDU); Maren Kaminski (Linke); Rocco Kever (AfD); Jörn König (AfD); Tilman Kuban (CDU); Helge Limburg (Grüne); Danny Meiners (AfD); Swantje Michaelsen (Grüne); Carsten Müller (CDU); Karoline Otte (Grüne); Andreas Paul (AfD); Filiz Polat (Grüne); Marcel Queckemeyer (AfD); Heidi Reichinnek (Linke); Angela Rudzka (AfD); Martin Sichert (AfD); Svenja Stadler (SPD); Vivian Tauschwitz (CDU); Anja Troff-Schaffarzyk (SPD); Martina Uhr (AfD); Julia Verlinden (Grüne); and Mareike Wulf (CDU).

Additional state seats following vacation of constituency seats:

- Henning Otte (CDU, Celle – Uelzen) resigned on 5 June 2025 and was replaced by Reza Asghari (CDU) on 10 June 2025.

===== 2021 =====
Results of the 2021 federal election held on 26 September 2021:

Party		Second votes per region				Total votes	%	Seats				
Party		Braun- schweig	Hanover	Lüne- burg	Weser -Ems	Total votes	%	Con.	State			Tot.
Party		Braun- schweig	Hanover	Lüne- burg	Weser -Ems	Total votes	%	Con.	Ini.	Lev.	Ele.	Tot.
Social Democratic Party of Germany	SPD	309,414	394,431	326,144	468,511	1,498,500	33.13%	22	0	4	4 (Note: The SPD were allocated three state seats in Lower Saxony following the federal election in September 2021 but, after the re-run of the federal election in parts of Berlin in February 2024, the seat allocation was recalculated across Germany and the SPD were allocated one additional state seat in Lower Saxony.)	26 (Note: One overhang seat.)
Christian Democratic Union of Germany	CDU	199,490	266,044	253,732	374,313	1,093,579	24.18%	8	7	3	10	18
Alliance 90/The Greens	Grüne	139,600	211,615	159,928	215,470	726,613	16.06%	0	10	3	13	13
Free Democratic Party	FDP	87,617	124,382	110,608	152,031	474,638	10.49%	0	6	2	8	8
Alternative for Germany	AfD	73,283	87,395	78,515	97,241	336,434	7.44%	0	5	1	6	6
Die Linke	Linke	31,194	40,566	32,452	44,445	148,657	3.29%	0	2	1	3	3
Human Environment Animal Protection Party		11,409	15,650	14,236	16,636	57,931	1.28%	0	0	0	0	0
Grassroots Democratic Party of Germany	dieBasis	9,438	12,104	12,199	12,628	46,369	1.03%	0	0	0	0	0
Die PARTEI		8,417	10,492	8,860	12,389	40,158	0.89%	0	0	0	0	0
Free Voters	FW	7,480	8,894	11,225	9,615	37,214	0.82%	0	0	0	0	0
Pirate Party Germany	Piraten	3,595	5,249	3,598	4,513	16,955	0.37%	0	0	0	0	0
Team Todenhöfer		3,095	5,266	2,071	3,133	13,565	0.30%	0	0	0	0	0
Volt Germany	Volt	2,828	3,334	2,268	3,467	11,897	0.26%	0	0	0	0	0
National Democratic Party of Germany	NPD	1,094	1,022	1,159	1,104	4,379	0.10%	0	0	0	0	0
Party of Humanists	PdH	825	1,107	782	1,092	3,806	0.08%	0	0	0	0	0
Ecological Democratic Party	ÖDP	884	841	833	926	3,484	0.08%	0	0	0	0	0
V-Partei3	V	805	940	737	801	3,283	0.07%	0	0	0	0	0
Die Urbane. Eine HipHop Partei		572	690	600	763	2,625	0.06%	0	0	0	0	0
Liberal Conservative Reformers	LKR	311	281	397	317	1,306	0.03%	0	0	0	0	0
German Communist Party	DKP	212	312	214	282	1,020	0.02%	0	0	0	0	0
Marxist–Leninist Party of Germany	MLPD	199	274	145	190	808	0.02%	0	0	0	0	0
Valid votes		891,762	1,190,889	1,020,703	1,419,867	4,523,221	100.00%	30	30	14	44	74
Rejected votes		9,196	11,744	7,105	11,876	39,921	0.87%					
Total polled		900,958	1,202,633	1,027,808	1,431,743	4,563,142	74.74%					
Registered electors		1,214,679	1,610,653	1,352,490	1,927,559	6,105,381						
Turnout		74.17%	74.67%	75.99%	74.28%	74.74%						

The following candidates were elected:

- State seats - Stephan Albani (CDU); Jens Beeck (FDP); Dirk Brandes (AfD); Frank Bsirske (Grüne); Christian Dürr (FDP); Thomas Ehrhorn (AfD); Enak Ferlemann (CDU); Dietmar Friedhoff (AfD); Knut Gerschau (FDP); Michael Grosse-Brömer (CDU); Fritz Güntzler (CDU); Anke Hennig (SPD); Gero Clemens Hocker (FDP); Hendrik Hoppenstedt (CDU); Anne Janssen (CDU); Katja Keul (Grüne); Sven-Christian Kindler (Grüne); Jörn König (AfD); Tilman Kuban (CDU); Konstantin Kuhle (FDP); Helge Limburg (Grüne); Susanne Menge (Grüne); Anikó Merten (FDP); Swantje Michaelsen (Grüne); Mathias Middelberg (CDU); Amira Mohamed Ali (Linke); Carsten Müller (CDU); Karoline Otte (Grüne); Julian Pahlke (Grüne); Victor Perli (Linke); Filiz Polat (Grüne); Heidi Reichinnek (Linke); Frank Rinck (AfD); Peggy Schierenbeck (SPD); Christina-Johanne Schröder (Grüne); Anja Schulz (FDP); Matthias Seestern-Pauly (FDP); Jürgen Trittin (Grüne); Anja Troff-Schaffarzyk (SPD); Julia Verlinden (Grüne); Stefan Wenzel (Grüne); Mareike Wulf (CDU); and Joachim Wundrak (AfD).

Following the re-run of the federal election in parts of Berlin in February 2024, the seat allocation was recalculated across Germany and the SPD was allocated one additional state seat in Lower Saxony which was initially allocated to Daniela De Ridder but, as she had already entered the Bundestag in June 2022 following the resignation of Yasmin Fahimi, the seat was taken up by Angela Hohmann.

Substitutions:

- Jürgen Trittin (Grüne) resigned on 5 January 2024 and was replaced by Ottmar von Holtz (Grüne) on 10 January 2024.

Additional state seats following vacation of constituency seats:

- Yasmin Fahimi (SPD, Stadt Hannover II) resigned on 30 May 2022 and was replaced by Daniela De Ridder (SPD) on 3 June 2022.
- Falko Mohrs (SPD, Helmstedt – Wolfsburg) resigned on 7 November 2022 and was replaced by Alexander Bartz (SPD) on 8 November 2022.
- Andreas Philippi (SPD, Göttingen I) resigned on 24 January 2023 and was replaced by Dirk-Ulrich Mende (SPD) on 25 January 2023.
- André Berghegger (CDU, Osnabrück-Land) resigned on 31 December 2023 and was replaced by Ingrid Pahlmann (CDU) on 2 January 2024.

==== 2010s ====
===== 2017 =====
Results of the 2017 federal election held on 24 September 2017:

Party		Second votes per region				Total votes	%	Seats				
Party		Braun- schweig	Hanover	Lüne- burg	Weser -Ems	Total votes	%	Con.	State			Tot.
Party		Braun- schweig	Hanover	Lüne- burg	Weser -Ems	Total votes	%	Con.	Ini.	Lev.	Ele.	Tot.
Christian Democratic Union of Germany	CDU	294,708	396,163	374,519	558,091	1,623,481	34.94%	16	5	0	5	21
Social Democratic Party of Germany	SPD	280,089	351,792	259,683	383,608	1,275,172	27.44%	14	3	3	6	20
Free Democratic Party	FDP	82,120	118,700	98,316	132,269	431,405	9.28%	0	6	1	7	7
Alternative for Germany	AfD	94,040	117,425	98,608	112,289	422,362	9.09%	0	6	1	7	7
Alliance 90/The Greens	Grüne	77,950	116,941	94,134	115,800	404,825	8.71%	0	5	1	6	6
Die Linke	Linke	69,039	90,175	69,281	94,484	322,979	6.95%	0	4	1	5	5
Die PARTEI		10,014	12,302	8,122	10,790	41,228	0.89%	0	0	0	0	0
Human Environment Animal Protection Party		8,951	11,341	9,837	10,358	40,487	0.87%	0	0	0	0	0
Free Voters	FW	3,579	4,373	5,866	5,360	19,178	0.41%	0	0	0	0	0
Pirate Party Germany	Piraten	4,096	5,458	3,448	4,681	17,683	0.38%	0	0	0	0	0
National Democratic Party of Germany	NPD	3,067	2,946	2,943	3,078	12,034	0.26%	0	0	0	0	0
German Centre	DM	1,962	2,855	1,573	1,756	8,146	0.18%	0	0	0	0	0
Basic Income Alliance	BGE	1,558	2,297	2,263	1,966	8,084	0.17%	0	0	0	0	0
Democracy in Motion	DiB	1,410	2,060	1,390	1,489	6,349	0.14%	0	0	0	0	0
V-Partei3	V	1,342	1,771	1,351	1,612	6,076	0.13%	0	0	0	0	0
Ecological Democratic Party	ÖDP	938	1,250	1,077	1,506	4,771	0.10%	0	0	0	0	0
Marxist–Leninist Party of Germany	MLPD	496	492	244	384	1,616	0.03%	0	0	0	0	0
German Communist Party	DKP	216	393	161	330	1,100	0.02%	0	0	0	0	0
Valid votes		935,575	1,238,734	1,032,816	1,439,851	4,646,976	100.00%	30	29	7	36	66
Rejected votes		7,455	9,027	7,043	11,370	34,895	0.75%					
Total polled		943,030	1,247,761	1,039,859	1,451,221	4,681,871	76.44%					
Registered electors		1,238,266	1,626,433	1,343,771	1,916,112	6,124,582						
Turnout		76.16%	76.72%	77.38%	75.74%	76.44%						

The following candidates were elected:

- State seats - Grigorios Aggelidis (FDP); Stephan Albani (CDU); Jens Beeck (FDP); Diether Dehm-Desoi (Linke); Christian Dürr (FDP); Thomas Ehrhorn (AfD); Maria Flachsbarth (CDU); Dietmar Friedhoff (AfD); Wilhelm von Gottberg (AfD); Fritz Güntzler (CDU); Armin-Paul Hampel (AfD); Waldemar Herdt (AfD); Gero Clemens Hocker (FDP); Ottmar von Holtz (Grüne); Ulla Ihnen (FDP); Jens Kestner (AfD); Katja Keul (Grüne); Sven-Christian Kindler (Grüne); Jörn König (AfD); Jutta Krellmann (Linke); Konstantin Kuhle (FDP); Ursula von der Leyen (CDU); Kirsten Lühmann (SPD); Caren Marks (SPD); Susanne Mittag (SPD); Amira Mohamed Ali (Linke); Carsten Müller (CDU); Victor Perli (Linke); Filiz Polat (Grüne); Daniela De Ridder (SPD); Matthias Seestern-Pauly (FDP); Rainer Spiering (SPD); Svenja Stadler (SPD); Jürgen Trittin (Grüne); Julia Verlinden (Grüne); and Pia Zimmermann (Linke).

Substitutions:

- Ursula von der Leyen (CDU) resigned on 31 July 2019 and was replaced by Ingrid Pahlmann (CDU) on 1 August 2019.

Additional state seats following vacation of constituency seats:

- Carola Reimann (SPD, Braunschweig) resigned on 21 November 2017 and was replaced by Marja-Liisa Völlers (SPD) on 23 November 2017.
- Sigmar Gabriel (SPD, Salzgitter – Wolfenbüttel) resigned on 3 November 2019 and was replaced by Markus Paschke (SPD) on 4 November 2019.
- Thomas Oppermann (SPD, Göttingen I) died on 25 October 2020 and was replaced by Hiltrud Lotze (SPD) on 24 November 2020.

===== 2013 =====
Results of the 2013 federal election held on 22 September 2013:

Party		Second votes per region				Total votes	%	Seats				
Party		Braun- schweig	Hanover	Lüne- burg	Weser -Ems	Total votes	%	Con.	State			Tot.
Party		Braun- schweig	Hanover	Lüne- burg	Weser -Ems	Total votes	%	Con.	Ini.	Lev.	Ele.	Tot.
Christian Democratic Union of Germany	CDU	339,077	454,534	416,806	615,175	1,825,592	41.07%	17	11	3	14	31
Social Democratic Party of Germany	SPD	324,871	416,886	303,824	424,424	1,470,005	33.07%	13	9	3	12	25
Alliance 90/The Greens	Grüne	80,454	115,987	89,882	105,578	391,901	8.82%	0	6	0	6	6
Die Linke	Linke	50,441	62,877	48,770	61,847	223,935	5.04%	0	3	1	4	4
Free Democratic Party	FDP	34,905	51,136	40,253	59,353	185,647	4.18%	0	0	0	0	0
Alternative for Germany	AfD	34,054	44,412	44,000	43,409	165,875	3.73%	0	0	0	0	0
Pirate Party Germany	Piraten	17,140	20,004	16,648	20,809	74,601	1.68%	0	0	0	0	0
National Democratic Party of Germany	NPD	9,079	9,566	9,017	9,753	37,415	0.84%	0	0	0	0	0
Human Environment Animal Protection Party		7,337	9,430	7,951	9,091	33,809	0.76%	0	0	0	0	0
Free Voters	FW	5,390	4,865	4,923	6,595	21,773	0.49%	0	0	0	0	0
Party of Bible-abiding Christians	PBC	1,453	1,339	1,103	1,769	5,664	0.13%	0	0	0	0	0
Pro Germany Citizens' Movement		1,173	1,685	977	1,155	4,990	0.11%	0	0	0	0	0
The Republicans	REP	679	959	525	623	2,786	0.06%	0	0	0	0	0
Marxist–Leninist Party of Germany	MLPD	324	385	229	329	1,267	0.03%	0	0	0	0	0
Valid votes		906,377	1,194,065	984,908	1,359,910	4,445,260	100.00%	30	29	7	36	66
Rejected votes		10,955	12,881	8,571	13,614	46,021	1.02%					
Total polled		917,332	1,206,946	993,479	1,373,524	4,491,281	73.42%					
Registered electors		1,252,549	1,633,559	1,333,318	1,898,047	6,117,473						
Turnout		73.24%	73.88%	74.51%	72.37%	73.42%						

The following candidates were elected:

- State seats - Stephan Albani (CDU); Heinz-Joachim Barchmann (SPD); Maik Beermann (CDU); Herbert Behrens (Linke); Diether Dehm-Desoi (Linke); Maria Flachsbarth (CDU); Fritz Güntzler (CDU); Christina Jantz (SPD); Hans-Werner Kammer (CDU); Katja Keul (Grüne); Sven-Christian Kindler (Grüne); Lars Klingbeil (SPD); Jutta Krellmann (Linke); Roy Kühne (CDU); Uwe Lagosky (CDU); Ursula von der Leyen (CDU); Wilfried Lorenz (CDU); Hiltrud Lotze (SPD); Kirsten Lühmann (SPD); Caren Marks (SPD); Peter Meiwald (Grüne); Susanne Mittag (SPD); Carsten Müller (CDU); Ingrid Pahlmann (CDU); Markus Paschke (SPD); Brigitte Pothmer (Grüne); Daniela De Ridder (SPD); Heiko Schmelzle (CDU); Rainer Spiering (SPD); Svenja Stadler (SPD); Jürgen Trittin (Grüne); Julia Verlinden (Grüne); Michael Vietz (CDU); Bernd Westphal (SPD); Barbara Woltmann (CDU); and Pia Zimmermann (Linke).

Substitutions:

- Heiko Schmelzle (CDU) resigned on 1 November 2016 and was replaced by Rainer Hajek (CDU) on the same day.

Additional state seats following vacation of constituency seats:

- Sebastian Edathy (SPD, Nienburg II – Schaumburg) resigned on 11 February 2014 and was replaced by Gabriele Groneberg (SPD) on the same day.
- Reinhard Grindel (CDU, Rotenburg I – Heidekreis) resigned on 4 June 2016 and was replaced by Kathrin Rösel (CDU) on the same day.

==== 2000s ====
===== 2009 =====
Results of the 2009 federal election held on 27 September 2009:

Party		Second votes per region				Total votes	%	Seats		
Party		Braun- schweig	Hanover	Lüne- burg	Weser -Ems	Total votes	%	Con.	Stat.	Tot.
Christian Democratic Union of Germany	CDU	282,820	367,948	329,030	491,732	1,471,530	33.20%	16	5	21
Social Democratic Party of Germany	SPD	291,516	377,847	264,547	364,030	1,297,940	29.28%	14	5	19
Free Democratic Party	FDP	109,136	156,271	135,606	187,388	588,401	13.27%	0	9	9
Alliance 90/The Greens	Grüne	97,265	137,168	111,661	129,648	475,742	10.73%	0	7	7
Die Linke	Linke	84,595	101,277	81,806	112,695	380,373	8.58%	0	6	6
Pirate Party Germany	Piraten	20,727	24,591	17,747	23,981	87,046	1.96%	0	0	0
National Democratic Party of Germany	NPD	12,905	15,469	12,955	12,580	53,909	1.22%	0	0	0
Human Environment Animal Protection Party		7,432	9,802	7,735	9,689	34,658	0.78%	0	0	0
Alliance 21/Pensioners' Party		7,758	9,356	8,232	6,631	31,977	0.72%	0	0	0
Ecological Democratic Party	ÖDP	956	1,576	1,250	1,582	5,364	0.12%	0	0	0
German People's Union	DVU	834	1,226	1,211	1,047	4,318	0.10%	0	0	0
Marxist–Leninist Party of Germany	MLPD	285	496	222	350	1,353	0.03%	0	0	0
Valid votes		916,229	1,203,027	972,002	1,341,353	4,432,611	100.00%	30	32	62
Rejected votes		11,455	12,797	10,281	15,205	49,738	1.11%			
Total polled		927,684	1,215,824	982,283	1,356,558	4,482,349	73.34%			
Registered electors		1,262,003	1,639,126	1,328,480	1,882,501	6,112,110				
Turnout		73.51%	74.18%	73.94%	72.06%	73.34%				

The following candidates were elected:

- State seats - Heinz-Joachim Barchmann (SPD); Herbert Behrens (Linke); Florian Bernschneider (FDP); Nicole Bracht-Bendt (FDP); Angelika Brunkhorst (FDP); Viola von Cramon-Taubadel (Grüne); Diether Dehm-Desoi (Linke); Heidrun Dittrich (Linke); Patrick Döring (FDP); Hartwig Fischer (CDU); Maria Flachsbarth (CDU); Hans-Michael Goldmann (FDP); Thilo Hoppe (Grüne); Katja Keul (Grüne); Sven-Christian Kindler (Grüne); Eckart von Klaeden (CDU); Lars Klingbeil (SPD); Lutz Knopek (FDP); Jutta Krellmann (Linke); Ursula von der Leyen (CDU); Kirsten Lühmann (SPD); Dorothée Menzner (Linke); Holger Ortel (SPD); Rita Pawelski (CDU); Brigitte Pothmer (Grüne); Herbert Schui (Linke); Martin Schwanholz (SPD); Dorothea Steiner (Grüne); Carl-Ludwig Thiele (FDP); Serkan Tören (FDP); Jürgen Trittin (Grüne); and Claudia Winterstein (FDP).

Substitutions:

- Carl-Ludwig Thiele (FDP) resigned on 5 May 2010 and was replaced by Christiane Ratjen-Damerau (FDP) on the same day.
- Herbert Schui (Linke) resigned on 1 November 2010 and was replaced by Johanna Voß (Linke) on the same day.

Additional state seats following vacation of constituency seats:

- Martina Krogmann (CDU, Stade I – Rotenburg II) resigned on 1 April 2010 and was replaced by Hans-Werner Kammer (CDU) on the same day.
- Astrid Grotelüschen (CDU, Delmenhorst – Wesermarsch – Oldenburg-Land) resigned on 27 April 2010 and was replaced by Ewa Klamt (CDU) on 29 April 2010.
- Garrelt Duin (SPD, Aurich – Emden) resigned on 21 June 2012 and was replaced by Gabriele Groneberg (SPD) on 26 June 2012.

===== 2005 =====
Results of the 2005 federal election held on 18 September 2005:

Party		Second votes per region				Total votes	%	Seats		
Party		Braun- schweig	Hanover	Lüne- burg	Weser -Ems	Total votes	%	Con.	Stat.	Tot.
Social Democratic Party of Germany	SPD	453,946	592,040	422,839	589,349	2,058,174	43.17%	25	2	27
Christian Democratic Union of Germany	CDU	308,867	394,365	356,676	540,039	1,599,947	33.56%	4	17	21
Free Democratic Party	FDP	83,408	114,597	99,413	128,923	426,341	8.94%	0	6	6
Alliance 90/The Greens	Grüne	72,149	105,994	83,285	93,425	354,853	7.44%	0	5	5
The Left Party.PDS	Linke	48,680	53,827	46,103	56,590	205,200	4.30%	0	3	3
National Democratic Party of Germany	NPD	14,083	16,583	14,683	14,395	59,744	1.25%	0	0	0
Human Environment Animal Protection Party		6,162	7,309	6,489	7,444	27,404	0.57%	0	0	0
The Grays – Gray Panthers	Graue	3,865	4,698	3,934	4,413	16,910	0.35%	0	0	0
Party of Bible-abiding Christians	PBC	2,599	2,897	2,621	2,990	11,107	0.23%	0	0	0
Initiative Pro D-Mark	Pro DM	830	1,012	908	1,119	3,869	0.08%	0	0	0
Bürgerrechtsbewegung Solidarität	BüSo	488	633	510	557	2,188	0.05%	0	0	0
Marxist–Leninist Party of Germany	MLPD	471	529	333	578	1,911	0.04%	0	0	0
Valid votes		995,548	1,294,484	1,037,794	1,439,822	4,767,648	100.00%	29	33	62
Rejected votes		14,815	15,569	11,735	19,135	61,254	1.27%			
Total polled		1,010,363	1,310,053	1,049,529	1,458,957	4,828,902	79.38%			
Registered electors		1,272,353	1,638,501	1,316,346	1,855,841	6,083,041				
Turnout		79.41%	79.95%	79.73%	78.61%	79.38%				

The following candidates were elected:

- State seats - Monika Brüning (CDU); Angelika Brunkhorst (FDP); Diether Dehm-Desoi (Linke); Patrick Döring (FDP); Thea Dückert (Grüne); Hans Georg Faust (CDU); Enak Ferlemann (CDU); Hartwig Fischer (CDU); Maria Flachsbarth (CDU); Jochen-Konrad Fromme (CDU); Hans-Michael Goldmann (FDP); Reinhard Grindel (CDU); Gabriele Groneberg (SPD); Michael Grosse-Brömer (CDU); Thilo Hoppe (Grüne); Hans-Werner Kammer (CDU); Eckart von Klaeden (CDU); Thomas Kossendey (CDU); Martina Krogmann (CDU); Ina Lenke (FDP); Dorothée Menzner (Linke); Eva Möllring (CDU); Carsten Müller (CDU); Henning Otte (CDU); Rita Pawelski (CDU); Friedbert Pflüger (CDU); Brigitte Pothmer (Grüne); Gerhard Schröder (SPD); Herbert Schui (Linke); Silke Stokar von Neuforn (Grüne); Carl-Ludwig Thiele (FDP); Jürgen Trittin (Grüne); and Claudia Winterstein (FDP).

Substitutions:

- Gerhard Schröder (SPD) resigned on 23 November 2005 and was replaced by Clemens Bollen (SPD) on 29 November 2005.
- Friedbert Pflüger (CDU) resigned on 24 November 2006 and was replaced by Hans Peter Thul (CDU) on 25 November 2006.

Additional state seats following vacation of constituency seats:

- Hans-Jürgen Uhl (SPD, Helmstedt – Wolfsburg) resigned on 1 June 2007 and was replaced by Dieter Steinecke (SPD) on 2 June 2007.

===== 2002 =====
Results of the 2002 federal election held on 22 September 2002:

Party		Second votes per region				Total votes	%	Seats		
Party		Braun- schweig	Hanover	Lüne- burg	Weser -Ems	Total votes	%	Con.	Stat.	Tot.
Social Democratic Party of Germany	SPD	517,310	669,842	473,805	657,668	2,318,625	47.84%	25	6	31
Christian Democratic Union of Germany	CDU	333,166	416,723	366,858	556,748	1,673,495	34.53%	4	18	22
Alliance 90/The Greens	Grüne	71,991	103,368	85,630	92,655	353,644	7.30%	0	5	5
Free Democratic Party	FDP	64,945	88,690	78,610	110,745	342,990	7.08%	0	5	5
Party of Democratic Socialism	PDS	11,894	14,198	11,294	12,994	50,380	1.04%	0	0	0
Party for a Rule of Law Offensive	Schill	6,814	13,730	14,009	8,612	43,165	0.89%	0	0	0
Human Environment Animal Protection Party		3,805	4,585	4,204	4,944	17,538	0.36%	0	0	0
The Republicans	REP	2,809	4,531	3,540	3,092	13,972	0.29%	0	0	0
National Democratic Party of Germany	NPD	3,787	3,009	3,198	2,911	12,905	0.27%	0	0	0
Party of Bible-abiding Christians	PBC	1,896	2,843	2,170	2,337	9,246	0.19%	0	0	0
The Grays – Gray Panthers	Graue	1,546	2,169	1,534	2,009	7,258	0.15%	0	0	0
Ecological Democratic Party	ÖDP	365	490	377	505	1,737	0.04%	0	0	0
Bürgerrechtsbewegung Solidarität	BüSo	225	446	359	248	1,278	0.03%	0	0	0
Valid votes		1,020,553	1,324,624	1,045,588	1,455,468	4,846,233	100.00%	29	34	63
Rejected votes		8,608	10,513	7,791	13,182	40,094	0.82%			
Total polled		1,029,161	1,335,137	1,053,379	1,468,650	4,886,327	80.96%			
Registered electors		1,274,687	1,635,023	1,297,593	1,827,867	6,035,170				
Turnout		80.74%	81.66%	81.18%	80.35%	80.96%				

The following candidates were elected:

- State seats - Monika Brüning (CDU); Vera Dominke (CDU); Thea Dückert (Grüne); Christian Eberl (FDP); Hans Georg Faust (CDU); Enak Ferlemann (CDU); Hartwig Fischer (CDU); Maria Flachsbarth (CDU); Jochen-Konrad Fromme (CDU); Hans-Michael Goldmann (FDP); Kurt-Dieter Grill (CDU); Reinhard Grindel (CDU); Gabriele Groneberg (SPD); Michael Grosse-Brömer (CDU); Klaus-Jürgen Hedrich (CDU); Monika Heubaum (SPD); Thilo Hoppe (Grüne); Eckart von Klaeden (CDU); Thomas Kossendey (CDU); Martina Krogmann (CDU); Ina Lenke (FDP); Walter Link (CDU); Gabriele Lösekrug-Möller (SPD); Volker Neumann (SPD); Rita Pawelski (CDU); Friedbert Pflüger (CDU); Reinhold Robbe (SPD); Heinrich-Wilhelm Ronsöhr (CDU); Gerhard Schröder (SPD); Silke Stokar von Neuforn (Grüne); Carl-Ludwig Thiele (FDP); Jürgen Trittin (Grüne); Marianne Tritz (Grüne); and Claudia Winterstein (FDP).

Substitutions:

- Christian Eberl (FDP) resigned on 20 March 2003 and was replaced by Angelika Brunkhorst (FDP) on 21 March 2003.
- Reinhold Robbe (SPD) resigned on 12 May 2005 and was replaced by Hans Forster (SPD) on the same day.

Additional state seats following vacation of constituency seats:

- Jann-Peter Janssen (SPD, Aurich – Emden) resigned on 24 January 2005 and was replaced by Lars Klingbeil (SPD) on the same day.

==== 1990s ====
===== 1998 =====
Results of the 1998 federal election held on 27 September 1998:

Party		Second votes per region				Total votes	%	Seats		
Party		Braun- schweig	Hanover	Lüne- burg	Weser -Ems	Total votes	%	Con.	Stat.	Tot.
Social Democratic Party of Germany	SPD	552,974	702,276	496,973	694,722	2,446,945	49.41%	27	8	35
Christian Democratic Union of Germany	CDU	342,637	422,709	365,596	559,011	1,689,953	34.13%	4	20	24
Free Democratic Party	FDP	62,481	87,569	69,486	94,967	314,503	6.35%	0	4	4
Alliance 90/The Greens	Grüne	61,927	86,783	67,511	76,578	292,799	5.91%	0	4	4
Party of Democratic Socialism	PDS	11,460	13,602	12,172	12,834	50,068	1.01%	0	1	1
The Republicans	REP	9,896	14,890	11,657	8,612	45,055	0.91%	0	0	0
German People's Union	DVU	6,566	9,178	7,565	7,860	31,169	0.63%	0	0	0
Initiative Pro D-Mark	Pro DM	7,686	7,174	6,380	7,933	29,173	0.59%	0	0	0
Human Environment Animal Protection Party		2,802	3,297	2,788	3,190	12,077	0.24%	0	0	0
The Grays – Gray Panthers	Graue	1,667	2,478	1,803	2,497	8,445	0.17%	0	0	0
National Democratic Party of Germany	NPD	1,845	1,639	1,713	1,626	6,823	0.14%	0	0	0
Party of Bible-abiding Christians	PBC	1,462	2,130	1,680	1,200	6,472	0.13%	0	0	0
Anarchist Pogo Party of Germany	APPD	1,202	1,458	1,378	1,664	5,702	0.12%	0	0	0
Federation of Free Citizens	BfB	1,224	1,580	1,746	1,100	5,650	0.11%	0	0	0
Natural Law Party		556	796	602	861	2,815	0.06%	0	0	0
Ecological Democratic Party	ÖDP	296	673	526	629	2,124	0.04%	0	0	0
Christian Centre	CM	303	528	293	462	1,586	0.03%	0	0	0
Party for Social Equality	PSG	150	184	117	151	602	0.01%	0	0	0
Valid votes		1,067,134	1,358,944	1,049,986	1,475,897	4,951,961	100.00%	31	37	68
Rejected votes		9,514	14,021	8,326	12,538	44,399	0.89%			
Total polled		1,076,648	1,372,965	1,058,312	1,488,435	4,996,360	83.91%			
Registered electors		1,279,634	1,625,545	1,261,541	1,787,847	5,954,567				
Turnout		84.14%	84.46%	83.89%	83.25%	83.91%				

The following candidates were elected:

- State seats - Gila Altmann (Grüne); Sylvia Bonitz (CDU); Thea Dückert (Grüne); Hans Georg Faust (CDU); Hans Forster (SPD); Jochen-Konrad Fromme (CDU); Hans-Michael Goldmann (FDP); Günter Graf (SPD); Kurt-Dieter Grill (CDU); Carl-Detlev Freiherr von Hammerstein (CDU); Klaus-Jürgen Hedrich (CDU); Monika Heubaum (SPD); Walter Hirche (FDP); Karl-Heinz Hornhues (CDU); Dietmar Kansy (CDU); Eckart von Klaeden (CDU); Eva-Maria Kors (CDU); Thomas Kossendey (CDU); Martina Krogmann (CDU); Ina Lenke (FDP); Walter Link (CDU); Helmut Lippelt (Grüne); Heidi Lippmann (PDS); Erich Maaß (CDU); Volker Neumann (SPD); Friedbert Pflüger (CDU); Marlies Pretzlaff (CDU); Reinhold Robbe (SPD); Heinrich-Wilhelm Ronsöhr (CDU); Gerhard Schröder (SPD); Erika Schuchardt (CDU); Werner Siemann (CDU); Rita Süssmuth (CDU); Carl-Ludwig Thiele (FDP); Jürgen Trittin (Grüne); Hedi Wegener (SPD); and Heino Wiese (SPD).

Additional state seats following vacation of constituency seats:

- Ernst Schwanhold (SPD, Stadt Osnabrück) resigned on 21 February 2000 and was replaced by Carola Reimann (SPD) on 22 February 2000.
- Dietmar Schütz (SPD, Oldenburg – Ammerland) resigned on 31 October 2001 and was replaced by Gabriele Lösekrug-Möller (SPD) on 1 November 2001.

===== 1994 =====
Results of the 1994 federal election held on 16 October 1994:

Party		Second votes per region				Total votes	%	Seats		
Party		Braun- schweig	Hanover	Lüne- burg	Weser -Ems	Total votes	%	Con.	Stat.	Tot.
Christian Democratic Union of Germany	CDU	432,818	516,026	420,435	602,385	1,971,664	41.27%	17	11	28
Social Democratic Party of Germany	SPD	443,968	556,211	378,223	559,919	1,938,321	40.57%	14	14	28
Free Democratic Party	FDP	72,213	105,706	80,734	109,527	368,180	7.71%	0	5	5
Alliance 90/The Greens	Grüne	73,378	100,329	76,277	88,103	338,087	7.08%	0	5	5
The Republicans	REP	13,785	19,956	13,511	10,736	57,988	1.21%	0	0	0
Party of Democratic Socialism	PDS	11,118	14,375	10,065	11,173	46,731	0.98%	0	1	1
The Grays – Gray Panthers	Graue	4,060	6,340	3,927	5,200	19,527	0.41%	0	0	0
Human Environment Animal Protection Party		3,589	4,442	3,528	4,319	15,878	0.33%	0	0	0
Party of Bible-abiding Christians	PBC	1,786	2,078	1,701	1,656	7,221	0.15%	0	0	0
Natural Law Party		1,206	1,973	1,227	1,901	6,307	0.13%	0	0	0
Ecological Democratic Party	ÖDP	830	1,789	1,369	1,635	5,623	0.12%	0	0	0
Bürgerrechtsbewegung Solidarität	BüSo	229	451	332	210	1,222	0.03%	0	0	0
Marxist–Leninist Party of Germany	MLPD	102	178	100	179	559	0.01%	0	0	0
Valid votes		1,059,082	1,329,854	991,429	1,396,943	4,777,308	100.00%	31	36	67
Rejected votes		8,992	11,292	7,304	11,802	39,390	0.82%			
Total polled		1,068,074	1,341,146	998,733	1,408,745	4,816,698	81.82%			
Registered electors		1,293,972	1,627,553	1,222,674	1,742,388	5,886,587				
Turnout		82.54%	82.40%	81.68%	80.85%	81.82%				

The following candidates were elected:

- State seats - Gila Altmann (Grüne); Günther Bredehorn (FDP); Gertrud Dempwolf (CDU); Heinz Dieter Eßmann (CDU); Günter Graf (SPD); Carl-Detlev Freiherr von Hammerstein (CDU); Arne Fuhrmann (SPD); Monika Ganseforth (SPD); Ingomar Hauchler (SPD); Monika Heubaum (SPD); Walter Hirche (FDP); Manuel Kiper (Grüne); Eckart von Klaeden (CDU); Detlef Kleinert (FDP); Rolf Köhne (PDS); Eva-Maria Kors (CDU); Thomas Kossendey (CDU); Detlev von Larcher (SPD); Helmut Lippelt (Grüne); Erich Maaß (CDU); Volker Neumann (SPD); Kurt Palis (SPD); Lisa Peters (FDP); Friedbert Pflüger (CDU); Marlies Pretzlaff (CDU); Reinhold Robbe (SPD); Horst Schild (SPD); Ursula Schönberger (Grüne); Waltraud Schoppe (Grüne); Erika Schuchardt (CDU); Ernst Schwanhold (SPD); Wilfried Seibel (CDU); Bodo Seidenthal (SPD); Peter Struck (SPD); Carl-Ludwig Thiele (FDP); and Inge Wettig-Danielmeier (SPD).

Additional state seats following vacation of constituency seats:

- Arne Börnsen (SPD, Verden – Osterholz) resigned on 6 January 1998 and was replaced by Eva Folta (SPD) on 9 January 1998.

===== 1990 =====
Results of the 1990 federal election held on 2 December 1990:

Party		Second votes per region				Total votes	%	Seats		
Party		Braun- schweig	Hanover	Lüne- burg	Weser -Ems	Total votes	%	Con.	Stat.	Tot.
Christian Democratic Union of Germany	CDU	459,882	539,686	432,224	607,876	2,039,668	44.31%	20	11	31
Social Democratic Party of Germany	SPD	409,250	524,310	334,069	498,299	1,765,928	38.36%	11	16	27
Free Democratic Party	FDP	97,359	143,565	107,250	126,435	474,609	10.31%	0	7	7
The Greens	Grüne	44,259	60,537	43,158	57,495	205,449	4.46%	0	0	0
The Republicans	REP	11,295	15,193	10,793	9,653	46,934	1.02%	0	0	0
The Grays – Gray Panthers	Graue	6,020	8,684	5,466	8,231	28,401	0.62%	0	0	0
Party of Democratic Socialism	PDS	3,987	4,819	2,534	3,314	14,654	0.32%	0	0	0
National Democratic Party of Germany	NPD	3,557	3,178	2,924	3,088	12,747	0.28%	0	0	0
Ecological Democratic Party	ÖDP	1,221	1,627	1,202	1,764	5,814	0.13%	0	0	0
Eco-Union		1,270	1,243	927	1,221	4,661	0.10%	0	0	0
Christian Centre	CM	930	1,151	996	1,443	4,520	0.10%	0	0	0
Valid votes		1,039,030	1,303,993	941,543	1,318,819	4,603,385	100.00%	31	34	65
Rejected votes		8,500	10,120	7,014	11,184	36,818	0.79%			
Total polled		1,047,530	1,314,113	948,557	1,330,003	4,640,203	80.55%			
Registered electors		1,288,613	1,611,862	1,178,995	1,680,912	5,760,382				
Turnout		81.29%	81.53%	80.45%	79.12%	80.55%				

The following candidates were elected:

- State seats - Wilfried Bohlsen (CDU); Günther Bredehorn (FDP); Gertrud Dempwolf (CDU); Peter Eckardt (SPD); Arne Fuhrmann (SPD); Monika Ganseforth (SPD); Fritz Gautier (SPD); Günter Graf (SPD); Carl-Detlev Freiherr von Hammerstein (CDU); Dirk Hansen (FDP); Ingomar Hauchler (SPD); Ernst Kastning (SPD); Detlef Kleinert (FDP); Eva-Maria Kors (CDU); Thomas Kossendey (CDU); Detlev von Larcher (SPD); Erich Maaß (CDU); Hedda Meseke (CDU); Volker Neumann (SPD); Jan Oostergetelo (SPD); Lisa Peters (FDP); Friedbert Pflüger (CDU); Helmut Sauer (CDU); Ernst Schwanhold (SPD); Wilfried Seibel (CDU); Bodo Seidenthal (SPD); Peter Struck (SPD); Carl-Ludwig Thiele (FDP); Günther Tietjen (SPD); Jürgen Timm (FDP); Hans-Peter Voigt (CDU); Inge Wettig-Danielmeier (SPD); Margrit Wetzel (SPD); and Torsten Wolfgramm (FDP).

Substitutions:

- Günther Tietjen (SPD) died on 7 July 1993 and was replaced by Kurt Palis (SPD) on 12 July 1993.
- Hedda Meseke (CDU) resigned on 6 December 1993 and was replaced by Maria Anna Hiebing (CDU) on 8 December 1993.

Additional state seats following vacation of constituency seats:

- Herbert Helmrich (CDU, Harburg) resigned on 21 May 1992 and was replaced by Jürgen Sikora (CDU) on 22 May 1992.

==== 1980s ====
===== 1987 =====
Results of the 1987 federal election held on 25 January 1987:

Party		Second votes per region				Total votes	%	Seats		
Party		Braun- schweig	Hanover	Lüne- burg	Weser -Ems	Total votes	%	Con.	Stat.	Tot.
Christian Democratic Union of Germany	CDU	445,556	522,396	417,487	584,528	1,969,967	41.49%	18	8	26
Social Democratic Party of Germany	SPD	466,004	580,138	367,051	554,250	1,967,443	41.44%	13	13	26
Free Democratic Party	FDP	79,937	123,001	96,907	120,037	419,882	8.84%	0	6	6
The Greens	Grüne	72,825	102,695	77,531	100,670	353,721	7.45%	0	5	5
National Democratic Party of Germany	NPD	5,496	5,872	5,649	4,967	21,984	0.46%	0	0	0
Ecological Democratic Party	ÖDP	1,345	2,378	1,911	1,873	7,507	0.16%	0	0	0
Responsible Citizens		796	964	821	1,010	3,591	0.08%	0	0	0
Patriots for Germany		603	843	655	775	2,876	0.06%	0	0	0
Marxist–Leninist Party of Germany	MLPD	236	372	218	348	1,174	0.02%	0	0	0
Valid votes		1,072,798	1,338,659	968,230	1,368,458	4,748,145	100.00%	31	32	63
Rejected votes		7,465	9,163	6,503	11,665	34,796	0.73%			
Total polled		1,080,263	1,347,822	974,733	1,380,123	4,782,941	84.98%			
Registered electors		1,261,564	1,582,309	1,150,794	1,633,437	5,628,104				
Turnout		85.63%	85.18%	84.70%	84.49%	84.98%				

The following candidates were elected:

- State seats - Karl Ahrens (SPD); Wilfried Bohlsen (CDU); Hans-Jochim Brauer (Grüne); Günther Bredehorn (FDP); Gertrud Dempwolf (CDU); Alfred Emmerlich (SPD); Annette Faße (SPD); Sigrid Folz-Steinacker (FDP); Monika Ganseforth (SPD); Charlotte Garbe (Grüne); Fritz Gautier (SPD); Günter Graf (SPD); Ingomar Hauchler (SPD); Detlef Kleinert (FDP); Thomas Kossendey (CDU); Klaus-Dieter Kühbacher (SPD); Herbert Lattmann (CDU); Helmut Lippelt (Grüne); Erich Maaß (CDU); Friedrich Neuhausen (FDP); Jan Oostergetelo (SPD); Helmut Sauer (CDU); Waltraud Schoppe (Grüne); Bodo Seidenthal (SPD); Peter Struck (SPD); Günther Tietjen (SPD); Jürgen Timm (FDP); Hans-Peter Voigt (CDU); Ludolf von Wartenberg (CDU); Torsten Wolfgramm (FDP); Lieselotte Wollny (Grüne); and Peter Würtz (SPD).

Substitutions:

- Waltraud Schoppe (Grüne) resigned on 21 June 1990 and was replaced by Norbert Roske (Grüne) on 22 June 1990.

===== 1983 =====
Results of the 1983 federal election held on 6 March 1983:

Party		Second votes per region				Total votes	%	Seats		
Party		Braun- schweig	Hanover	Lüne- burg	Weser -Ems	Total votes	%	Con.	Stat.	Tot.
Christian Democratic Union of Germany	CDU	500,695	595,012	466,632	661,649	2,223,988	45.62%	21	8	29
Social Democratic Party of Germany	SPD	481,321	611,730	379,077	543,603	2,015,731	41.35%	10	16	26
Free Democratic Party	FDP	66,200	100,063	73,994	98,159	338,416	6.94%	0	4	4
The Greens	Grüne	56,109	80,047	63,562	78,879	278,597	5.72%	0	4	4
National Democratic Party of Germany	NPD	2,479	2,502	2,668	2,215	9,864	0.20%	0	0	0
German Communist Party	DKP	1,446	1,872	984	2,059	6,361	0.13%	0	0	0
European Workers' Party	EAP	239	474	274	351	1,338	0.03%	0	0	0
League of West German Communists	BWK	151	168	91	131	541	0.01%	0	0	0
Valid votes		1,108,640	1,391,868	987,282	1,387,046	4,874,836	100.00%	31	32	63
Rejected votes		7,623	9,659	6,320	10,623	34,225	0.70%			
Total polled		1,116,263	1,401,527	993,602	1,397,669	4,909,061	89.57%			
Registered electors		1,242,329	1,556,967	1,112,846	1,568,308	5,480,450				
Turnout		89.85%	90.02%	89.28%	89.12%	89.57%				

The following candidates were elected:

- State seats - Karl Ahrens (SPD); Wilfried Bohlsen (CDU); Günther Bredehorn (FDP); Werner Broll (CDU); Lothar Curdt (SPD); Alfred Emmerlich (SPD); Heinrich Franke (CDU); Ingomar Hauchler (SPD); Rudolf Hauck (SPD); Erika Hickel (Grüne); Gert Jannsen (Grüne); Ernst Kastning (SPD); Günter Kiehm (SPD); Detlef Kleinert (FDP); Julius H. Krizsan (Grüne); Klaus-Dieter Kühbacher (SPD); Jürgen Linde (SPD); Erich Maaß (CDU); Friedrich Neuhausen (FDP); Hanna Neumeister (CDU); Jan Oostergetelo (SPD); Eberhard Pohlmann (CDU); Helmut Sauer (CDU); Waltraud Schoppe (Grüne); Gerhard Schröder (SPD); Wolfgang Schwenk (SPD); Adolf Stockleben (SPD); Peter Struck (SPD); Günther Tietjen (SPD); Ludolf von Wartenberg (CDU); Torsten Wolfgramm (FDP); and Peter Würtz (SPD).

Substitutions:

- Jürgen Linde (SPD) resigned on 10 November 1983 and was replaced by Volker Neumann (SPD) on 11 November 1983.
- Heinrich Franke (CDU) resigned on 9 April 1984 and was replaced by Carl-Detlev Freiherr von Hammerstein (CDU) on the same day.
- Gert Jannsen (Grüne) resigned on 1 March 1985 and was replaced by Heidemarie Dann (Grüne) on 2 March 1985.
- Erika Hickel (Grüne) resigned on 9 March 1985 and was replaced by Joachim Müller (Politiker, 1947) (Grüne) on 13 March 1985.
- Julius H. Krizsan (Grüne) resigned on 13 March 1985 and was replaced by Henning Schierholz (Grüne) on 14 March 1985.
- Waltraud Schoppe (Grüne) resigned on 31 March 1985 and was replaced by Helmut Werner (Grüne) on 2 April 1985.
- Gerhard Schröder (SPD) resigned on 1 July 1986 and was replaced by Helmuth Möhring (SPD) on 8 July 1986.

Additional state seats following vacation of constituency seats:

- Hans Hugo Klein (CDU, Göttingen I) resigned on 20 December 1983 and was replaced by Hans-Peter Voigt (CDU) on 21 December 1983.
- Horst Schröder (CDU, Lüneburg – Lüchow-Dannenberg) resigned on 22 March 1984 and was replaced by Gertrud Dempwolf (CDU) on the same day.
- Walter Polkehn (SPD, Oldenburg – Ammerland) died on 16 August 1985 and was replaced by Karl-Arnold Eickmeyer (SPD) on 23 August 1985.

===== 1980 =====
Results of the 1980 federal election held on 5 October 1980:

Party		Second votes per region				Total votes	%	Seats		
Party		Braun- schweig	Hanover	Lüne- burg	Weser -Ems	Total votes	%	Con.	Stat.	Tot.
Social Democratic Party of Germany	SPD	536,838	681,009	417,205	597,479	2,232,531	46.95%	23	7	30
Christian Democratic Union of Germany	CDU	425,304	506,084	395,825	564,600	1,891,813	39.78%	8	18	26
Free Democratic Party	FDP	113,460	161,071	116,336	145,047	535,914	11.27%	0	7	7
The Greens	Grüne	16,017	20,969	19,131	21,358	77,475	1.63%	0	0	0
German Communist Party	DKP	1,563	2,011	1,231	2,215	7,020	0.15%	0	0	0
National Democratic Party of Germany	NPD	1,694	1,737	1,934	1,742	7,107	0.15%	0	0	0
Communist League of West Germany	KBW	401	334	277	474	1,486	0.03%	0	0	0
People's Front Against Reaction, Fascism and War	VF	136	205	256	396	993	0.02%	0	0	0
European Workers' Party	EAP	204	240	159	200	803	0.02%	0	0	0
Valid votes		1,095,617	1,373,660	952,354	1,333,511	4,755,142	100.00%	31	32	63
Rejected votes		7,432	9,882	7,200	11,177	35,691	0.74%			
Total polled		1,103,049	1,383,542	959,554	1,344,688	4,790,833	89.32%			
Registered electors		1,227,770	1,537,468	1,079,165	1,519,173	5,363,576				
Turnout		89.84%	89.99%	88.92%	88.51%	89.32%				

The following candidates were elected:

- State seats - Karl Ahrens (SPD); Ursula Benedix-Engler (CDU); Günther Bredehorn (FDP); Werner Broll (CDU); Joachim Clemens (CDU); Heinrich Franke (CDU); Wolfgang von Geldern (CDU); Karl-Heinz Hornhues (CDU); Dietmar Kansy (CDU); Walther Leisler Kiep (CDU); Hans Hugo Klein (CDU); Detlef Kleinert (FDP); Volkmar Köhler (CDU); Erich Maaß (CDU); Helmuth Möhring (SPD); Engelbert Nelle (CDU); Friedrich Neuhausen (FDP); Paul Neumann (SPD); Volker Neumann (SPD); Hanna Neumeister (CDU); Erke Noth (FDP); Jan Oostergetelo (SPD); Eberhard Pohlmann (CDU); Helmut Sauer (CDU); Diedrich Schröder (CDU); Rudolf Sprung (CDU); Peter Struck (SPD); Günther Tietjen (SPD); Jürgen Timm (FDP); Ludolf von Wartenberg (CDU); Friedrich Wendig (FDP); and Torsten Wolfgramm (FDP).

Substitutions:

- Walther Leisler Kiep (CDU) resigned on 26 April 1982 and was replaced by Herbert Lattmann (CDU) on 27 April 1982.

Additional state seats following vacation of constituency seats:

- Burkhard Ritz (CDU, Mittelems) resigned on 2 December 1980 and was replaced by Martin Oldenstädt (CDU) on 5 December 1980.
- Hans Hubrig (CDU, Celle – Uelzen) died on 25 March 1982 and was replaced by Karl-Hans Lagershausen (CDU) on 29 March 1982.

==== 1970s ====
===== 1976 =====
Results of the 1976 federal election held on 3 October 1976:

Party		Second votes per region								Total votes	%	Seats		
Party		Aurich	Braun- schweig	Hanover	Hildes- heim	Lüne- burg	Olden- burg	Osna- brück	Stade	Total votes	%	Con.	Stat.	Tot.
Social Democratic Party of Germany	SPD	135,803	311,561	534,826	282,244	259,577	229,474	184,073	191,944	2,129,502	45.71%	18	11	29
Christian Democratic Union of Germany	CDU	99,128	261,396	473,809	244,654	322,237	251,811	273,341	202,767	2,129,143	45.70%	12	16	28
Free Democratic Party	FDP	15,724	44,506	101,082	40,505	52,426	50,662	30,856	33,765	369,526	7.93%	0	5	5
National Democratic Party of Germany	NPD	513	1,373	2,519	1,276	2,354	1,543	1,012	1,544	12,134	0.26%	0	0	0
German Communist Party	DKP	702	1,453	2,845	1,418	1,250	1,637	920	1,007	11,232	0.24%	0	0	0
Communist League of West Germany	KBW	423	1,136	1,703	1,021	1,012	886	630	630	3,979	0.09%	0	0	0
Communist Party of Germany (Organisational Structure)	KPD (AO)	423	1,136	1,703	1,021	1,012	886	630	630	2,297	0.05%	0	0	0
European Workers' Party	EAP	423	1,136	1,703	1,021	1,012	886	630	630	1,165	0.03%	0	0	0
Valid votes		252,293	621,425	1,116,784	571,118	638,856	536,013	490,832	431,657	4,658,978	100.00%	30	32	62
Rejected votes		7,465	11,710	20,574	11,685	11,231	12,966	12,910	9,857	98,398	2.07%			
Total polled		259,758	633,135	1,137,358	582,803	650,087	548,979	503,742	441,514	4,757,376	91.39%			
Registered electors		289,278	693,923	1,240,212	627,889	712,020	610,084	545,643	486,631	5,205,680				
Turnout		89.80%	91.24%	91.71%	92.82%	91.30%	89.98%	92.32%	90.73%	91.39%				

The following candidates were elected:

- State seats - Joachim Angermeyer (FDP); Ursula Benedix (CDU); Lenelotte von Bothmer (SPD); Werner Broll (CDU); Alfred Emmerlich (SPD); Heinrich Franke (CDU); Herbert Gruhl (CDU); Hans Edgar Jahn (CDU); Hans Hugo Klein (CDU); Detlef Kleinert (FDP); Volkmar Köhler (CDU); Karl-Hans Lagershausen (CDU); Hans Lemp (SPD); Walther Ludewig (FDP); Helmuth Möhring (SPD); Paul Neumann (SPD); Hanna Neumeister (CDU); Franz-Josef Nordlohne (CDU); Jan Oostergetelo (SPD); Eberhard Pohlmann (CDU); Helmut Sauer (CDU); Diedrich Schröder (CDU); Olaf Schwencke (SPD); Wolfgang Schwenk (SPD); Rudolf Sprung (CDU); Adolf Stockleben (SPD); Olaf Sund (SPD); Hans-Adolf de Terra (CDU); Ludolf von Wartenberg (CDU); Friedrich Wendig (FDP); Torsten Wolfgramm (FDP); and Peter Würtz (SPD).

Substitutions:

- Olaf Sund (SPD) resigned on 17 May 1977 and was replaced by Karl-Arnold Eickmeyer (SPD) on 23 May 1977.
- Franz-Josef Nordlohne (CDU) resigned on 4 September 1979 and was replaced by Ferdinand Erpenbeck (CDU) on 10 September 1979.

Additional state seats following vacation of constituency seats:

- Karl Ravens (SPD, Verden) resigned on 15 June 1978 and was replaced by Volker Neumann (SPD) on 20 June 1978.
- Philipp von Bismarck (CDU, Gifhorn) resigned on 6 September 1979 and was replaced by Martin Oldenstädt (CDU) on 11 September 1979.

===== 1972 =====
Results of the 1972 federal election held on 19 November 1972:

Party		Second votes per region								Total votes	%	Seats		
Party		Aurich	Braun- schweig	Hanover	Hildes- heim	Lüne- burg	Olden- burg	Osna- brück	Stade	Total votes	%	Con.	Stat.	Tot.
Social Democratic Party of Germany	SPD	137,426	301,983	521,102	334,179	317,319	242,945	190,804	190,153	2,235,911	48.06%	23	7	30
Christian Democratic Union of Germany	CDU	90,899	222,098	399,539	255,080	337,244	234,812	261,153	187,895	1,988,720	42.75%	7	20	27
Free Democratic Party	FDP	17,626	47,062	102,174	51,140	60,379	49,433	32,818	32,650	393,282	8.45%	0	5	5
National Democratic Party of Germany	NPD	1,105	2,175	4,482	2,669	4,817	3,028	1,959	2,672	22,907	0.49%	0	0	0
German Communist Party	DKP	593	1,293	2,246	1,306	1,329	1,190	731	779	9,467	0.20%	0	0	0
European Federalist Party	EFP	70	237	469	307	476	231	185	212	2,187	0.05%	0	0	0
Valid votes		247,719	574,848	1,030,012	644,681	721,564	531,639	487,650	414,361	4,652,474	100.00%	30	32	62
Rejected votes		2,085	3,724	7,037	4,670	4,813	3,918	3,438	2,739	32,424	0.69%			
Total polled		249,804	578,572	1,037,049	649,351	726,377	535,557	491,088	417,100	4,684,898	91.39%			
Registered electors		282,209	632,695	1,128,484	696,059	793,469	597,223	534,218	462,158	5,126,515				
Turnout		88.52%	91.45%	91.90%	93.29%	91.54%	89.67%	91.93%	90.25%	91.39%				

The following candidates were elected:

- State seats - Odal von Alten-Nordheim (CDU); Ursula Benedix (CDU); Philipp von Bismarck (CDU); Lenelotte von Bothmer (SPD); Jan Eilers (CDU); Otto Freiherr von Fircks (CDU); Heinrich Franke (CDU); Horst Gerlach (SPD); Carlo Graaff (FDP); Rötger Groß (FDP); Herbert Gruhl (CDU); Karl-Heinz Hornhues (CDU); Hans Edgar Jahn (CDU); Hans Hugo Klein (CDU); Detlef Kleinert (FDP); Volkmar Köhler (CDU); Karl-Hans Lagershausen (CDU); Hans Lemp (SPD); Fritz Logemann (FDP); Helmuth Möhring (SPD); Paul Neumann (SPD); Hanna Neumeister (CDU); Franz-Josef Nordlohne (CDU); Martin Oldenstädt (CDU); Eberhard Pohlmann (CDU); Helmut Sauer (CDU); Diedrich Schröder (CDU); Olaf Schwencke (SPD); Rudolf Sprung (CDU); Hans-Adolf de Terra (CDU); Friedrich Wendig (FDP); and Willi Wolf (SPD).

Substitutions:

- Rötger Groß (FDP) resigned on 5 July 1974 and was replaced by Torsten Wolfgramm (FDP) on the same day.
- Carlo Graaff (FDP) died on 9 December 1975 and was replaced by Friedrich Kreibaum (FDP) on 15 December 1975.

Additional state seats following vacation of constituency seats:

- Hans Hermsdorf (SPD, Cuxhaven) resigned on 30 May 1974 and was replaced by Wolfgang Schwenk (SPD) on 3 June 1974.
- Günter Wichert (SPD, Göttingen) resigned on 10 September 1974 and was replaced by Günther Tietjen (SPD) on 12 September 1974.

==== 1960s ====
===== 1969 =====
Results of the 1969 federal election held on 28 September 1969:

Party		Second votes per region								Total votes	%	Seats		
Party		Aurich	Braun- schweig	Hanover	Hildes- heim	Lüne- burg	Olden- burg	Osna- brück	Stade	Total votes	%	Con.	Stat.	Tot.
Christian Democratic Union of Germany	CDU	89,348	224,205	368,178	240,717	295,457	222,605	244,393	169,611	1,854,514	45.17%	12	18	30
Social Democratic Party of Germany	SPD	97,022	259,591	451,361	286,865	238,260	179,748	147,756	136,773	1,797,376	43.78%	18	11	29
Free Democratic Party	FDP	10,604	27,221	61,423	28,331	32,128	31,456	19,735	19,573	230,471	5.61%	0	4	4
National Democratic Party of Germany	NPD	10,685	18,528	37,998	24,718	36,415	24,402	13,806	21,720	188,272	4.59%	0	0	0
Campaign for Democratic Progress	ADF	1,143	3,129	4,725	2,297	2,070	1,862	976	981	17,183	0.42%	0	0	0
All-German Party	GDP	626	1,659	5,301	2,938	3,965	1,121	1,114	1,090	9,732	0.24%	0	0	0
European Party	EP	626	1,659	5,301	2,938	3,965	1,121	1,114	1,090	5,394	0.13%	0	0	0
Free Social Union	FSU	626	1,659	5,301	2,938	3,965	1,121	1,114	1,090	2,688	0.07%	0	0	0
Valid votes		209,428	534,333	928,986	585,866	608,295	461,194	427,780	349,748	4,105,630	100.00%	30	33	63
Rejected votes		3,691	7,398	12,745	8,188	8,250	7,408	6,248	5,132	59,060	1.42%			
Total polled		213,119	541,731	941,731	594,054	616,545	468,602	434,028	354,880	4,164,690	87.48%			
Registered electors		260,106	610,833	1,070,178	661,121	707,403	549,066	489,311	412,920	4,760,938				
Turnout		81.94%	88.69%	88.00%	89.86%	87.16%	85.35%	88.70%	85.94%	87.48%				

The following candidates were elected:

- State seats - Odal von Alten-Nordheim (CDU); Hermann Barche (SPD); Lenelotte von Bothmer (SPD); Bruno Brandes (CDU); Alfred Burgemeister (CDU); Felix von Eckardt (CDU); Otto Freiherr von Fircks (CDU); Heinrich Franke (CDU); Horst Gerlach (SPD); Carlo Graaff (FDP); Herbert Gruhl (CDU); Wilhelm Helms (FDP); Maria Henze (CDU); Hans Hermsdorf (SPD); Hans Edgar Jahn (CDU); Gerhard Jungmann (CDU); Margot Kalinke (CDU); Detlef Kleinert (FDP); Hans Lemp (SPD); Fritz Logemann (FDP); Rudi Lotze (SPD); Helmuth Möhring (SPD); Paul Neumann (SPD); Edelhard Rock (CDU); Herbert Schneider (CDU); Wolfgang Schollmeyer (SPD); Diedrich Schröder (CDU); J. Hermann Siemer (CDU); Rudolf Sprung (CDU); Franz Varelmann (CDU); Rudolf Werner (CDU); Willi Wolf (SPD); and Peter Würtz (SPD).

Substitutions:

- Bruno Brandes (CDU) resigned on 29 October 1969 and was replaced by Eberhard Pohlmann (CDU) on 4 November 1969.
- Alfred Burgemeister (CDU) resigned on 23 April 1970 and was replaced by Alfred Hein (CDU) on 27 April 1970.
- Alfred Hein (CDU) died on 18 April 1971 and was replaced by Walther Hellige (CDU) on 19 April 1971.
- Rudi Lotze (SPD) died on 17 October 1971 and was replaced by Hermann Oetting (SPD) on 19 October 1971.
- Maria Henze (CDU) died on 10 April 1972 and was replaced by Günter Schlichting-von Rönn (CDU) on 17 April 1972.

Additional state seats following vacation of constituency seats:

- Heinrich Schröder (CDU, Cuxhaven) resigned on 12 September 1972 and was replaced by Heinz Hartnack (CDU) on 14 September 1972.

===== 1965 =====
Results of the 1965 federal election held on 19 September 1965:

Party		Second votes per region									Total votes	%	Seats		
Party		Aurich	Braun- schweig	Hanover	Hildes- heim	Lüne- burg	Olden- burg	Osna- brück	Stade	Postal votes	Total votes	%	Con.	Stat.	Tot.
Christian Democratic Union of Germany	CDU	86,909	210,206	333,292	219,269	265,294	214,822	236,882	162,192	126,258	1,855,124	45.77%	20	9	29
Social Democratic Party of Germany	SPD	80,618	221,998	392,778	253,823	196,270	145,241	122,932	114,277	86,603	1,614,540	39.84%	10	16	26
Free Democratic Party	FDP	18,919	49,549	100,624	56,687	62,145	53,517	32,537	32,067	34,815	440,860	10.88%	0	7	7
National Democratic Party of Germany	NPD	6,197	14,126	29,736	18,144	24,735	16,874	10,329	11,207	10,869	102,470	2.53%	0	0	0
German Peace Union	DFU	6,197	14,126	29,736	18,144	24,735	16,874	10,329	11,207	10,869	31,653	0.78%	0	0	0
Action Group of Independent Germans	AUD	6,197	14,126	29,736	18,144	24,735	16,874	10,329	11,207	10,869	5,460	0.13%	0	0	0
Free Social Union	FSU	6,197	14,126	29,736	18,144	24,735	16,874	10,329	11,207	10,869	2,634	0.06%	0	0	0
Valid votes		192,643	495,879	856,430	547,923	548,444	430,454	402,680	319,743	258,545	4,052,741	100.00%	30	32	62
Rejected votes		6,117	12,142	18,756	11,857	13,452	10,926	8,789	9,180	1,889	93,108	2.25%			
Total polled		198,760	508,021	875,186	559,780	561,896	441,380	411,469	328,923	260,434	4,145,849	87.31%			
Registered electors		255,414	620,077	1,079,618	670,215	689,621	541,391	487,567	404,415	7	4,748,325				
Turnout		77.82%	81.93%	81.06%	83.52%	81.48%	81.53%	84.39%	81.33%		87.31%				

The following candidates were elected:

- State seats - Hermann Ahrens (SPD); Hermann Conring (CDU); Johann Cramer (SPD); Alexander Elbrächter (CDU); Heinrich Franke (CDU); Günter Frede (SPD); Horst Gerlach (SPD); Carlo Graaff (FDP); Rudolf Hauck (SPD); Walther Hellige (FDP); Hans Hermsdorf (SPD); Hans Ils (SPD); Hans Edgar Jahn (CDU); Gerhard Jungmann (CDU); Margot Kalinke (CDU); Lisa Korspeter (SPD); Heinrich Krone (CDU); Ernst Kuntscher (CDU); Werner Kunze (SPD); Fritz Logemann (FDP); Rudi Lotze (SPD); Herwart Miessner (FDP); Heinz Morgenstern (SPD); Bernhard Mühlhan (FDP); Paul Neumann (SPD); Joachim Raffert (SPD); Karl Ravens (SPD); Heinrich Sander (FDP); Helmut Schlüter (SPD); Franz Varelmann (CDU); Gerold Wächter (FDP); and Willi Wolf (SPD).

Substitutions:

- Heinz Morgenstern (SPD) resigned on 14 September 1966 and was replaced by Kurt Ross (SPD) on 21 September 1966.
- Helmut Schlüter (SPD) died on 7 April 1967 and was replaced by Hermann Barche (SPD) on 14 April 1967.
- Günter Frede (SPD) died on 23 November 1967 and was replaced by Hans Lemp (SPD) on 29 November 1967.

Additional state seats following vacation of constituency seats:

- Hans-Christoph Seebohm (CDU, Soltau – Harburg) died on 17 September 1967 and was replaced by Heinrich Lindenberg (CDU) on 29 September 1967.

===== 1961 =====
Results of the 1961 federal election held on 17 September 1961:

Party		Second votes per region									Total votes	%	Seats		
Party		Aurich	Braun- schweig	Hanover	Hildes- heim	Lüne- burg	Olden- burg	Osna- brück	Stade	Postal votes	Total votes	%	Con.	Stat.	Tot.
Christian Democratic Union of Germany	CDU	74,098	196,773	277,465	188,839	197,450	185,758	218,395	108,692	89,486	1,536,956	38.98%	15	11	26
Social Democratic Party of Germany	SPD	78,799	217,364	383,505	242,999	182,071	139,065	111,616	112,344	59,061	1,526,824	38.72%	19	6	25
Free Democratic Party	FDP	20,830	52,931	123,707	69,635	72,075	67,288	39,835	37,844	34,994	519,139	13.17%	0	9	9
All-German Party	GDP	4,792	17,278	43,843	33,311	56,782	14,424	15,606	46,103	10,080	242,219	6.14%	0	0	0
Deutsche Reichspartei	DRP	2,844	5,492	13,865	6,140	13,429	8,737	4,456	6,072	2,216	63,251	1.60%	0	0	0
German Peace Union	DFU	2,974	8,123	13,141	6,228	5,754	4,511	4,279	3,352	2,018	50,380	1.28%	0	0	0
German Community	DG	87	612	787	1,088	875	201	103	305	128	4,186	0.11%	0	0	0
Valid votes		184,424	498,573	856,313	548,240	528,436	419,984	394,290	314,712	197,983	3,942,955	100.00%	34	26	60
Rejected votes		8,837	18,210	25,778	18,867	21,808	16,631	13,265	14,596	2,543	140,535	3.44%			
Total polled		193,261	516,783	882,091	567,107	550,244	436,615	407,555	329,308	200,526	4,083,490	88.52%			
Registered electors		247,153	610,573	1,052,116	660,290	655,086	520,473	471,740	395,681		4,613,112				
Turnout		78.19%	84.64%	83.84%	85.89%	84.00%	83.89%	86.39%	83.23%		88.52%				

The following candidates were elected:

- State seats - Georg Böhme (CDU); Alexander Elbrächter (CDU); Hedi Flitz (FDP); Horst Gerlach (SPD); Walter Harm (SPD); Walther Hellige (FDP); Gerhard Jungmann (CDU); Margot Kalinke (CDU); Lisa Korspeter (SPD); Reinhold Kreitmeyer (FDP); Ernst Kuntscher (CDU); Fritz Logemann (FDP); Johannes Lücke (SPD); Konrad Mälzig (FDP); Hans-Joachim von Merkatz (CDU); Herwart Miessner (FDP); Moritz-Ernst Priebe (SPD); Helmut Rohde (SPD); Heinrich Sander (FDP); J. Hermann Siemer (CDU); Friedrich Soetebier (FDP); Willy Steinmetz (CDU); Franz Varelmann (CDU); Elisabeth Vietje (CDU); Gerold Wächter (FDP); and Rudolf Werner (CDU).

Substitutions:

- Elisabeth Vietje (CDU) died on 2 May 1963 and was replaced by Theodor Oberländer (CDU) on 9 May 1963.
- Walter Harm (SPD) resigned on 10 August 1964 and was replaced by Kurt Ross (SPD) on 18 August 1964.

Additional state seats following vacation of constituency seats:

- Erich Ollenhauer (SPD, Stadt Hannover-South) died on 14 December 1963 and was replaced by Willi Wolf (SPD) on 19 December 1963.
- Kurt Schröder (SPD, Harz) died on 6 September 1964 and was replaced by Helmut Schlüter (SPD) on 11 September 1964.
- Uwe-Jens Nissen (SPD, Peine – Gifhorn) resigned on 1 October 1964 and was replaced by Gerhard Reichhardt (SPD) on 5 October 1964.

==== 1950s ====
===== 1957 =====
Results of the 1957 federal election held on 15 September 1957:

Party		Second votes per region									Total votes	%	Seats		
Party		Aurich	Braun- schweig	Hanover	Hildes- heim	Lüne- burg	Olden- burg	Osna- brück	Stade	Postal votes	Total votes	%	Con.	Stat.	Tot.
Christian Democratic Union of Germany	CDU	72,240	213,525	263,103	194,769	176,432	187,067	211,371	86,631	90,205	1,495,343	39.08%	21	6	27
Social Democratic Party of Germany	SPD	76,911	176,279	328,093	202,221	133,968	114,051	90,057	92,115	41,509	1,255,204	32.80%	8	14	22
German Party	DP	9,481	35,424	96,368	44,876	92,572	28,461	25,477	82,815	20,462	435,936	11.39%	5	3	8
All-German Bloc/ League of Expellees and Deprived of Rights	GB/BHE	7,938	33,483	59,490	50,134	53,910	26,221	21,879	26,460	11,648	291,163	7.61%	0	0	0
Free Democratic Party	FDP	10,275	22,738	53,735	36,262	25,926	33,945	13,886	14,031	15,665	226,463	5.92%	0	4	4
Federalist Union	FU	89	296	849	887	1,048	3,084	6,392	438	466	13,549	0.35%	0	0	0
Deutsche Reichspartei	DRP	4,422	10,148	24,057	13,547	22,580	15,495	7,024	7,340	4,142	88,963	2.32%	0	0	0
German Middle Class	UDM	4,422	10,148	24,057	13,547	22,580	15,495	7,024	7,340	4,142	9,660	0.25%	0	0	0
Bund der Deutschen	BdD	4,422	10,148	24,057	13,547	22,580	15,495	7,024	7,340	4,142	6,812	0.18%	0	0	0
German Community	DG	4,422	10,148	24,057	13,547	22,580	15,495	7,024	7,340	4,142	3,320	0.09%	0	0	0
Valid votes		181,356	491,893	825,695	542,696	506,436	408,324	376,086	309,830	184,097	3,826,413	100.00%	34	27	61
Rejected votes		6,111	15,184	26,530	16,928	20,135	13,354	11,248	12,200	2,145	123,835	3.13%			
Total polled		187,467	507,077	852,225	559,624	526,571	421,678	387,334	322,030	186,242	3,950,248	88.99%			
Registered electors		238,873	595,538	1,005,326	646,982	621,423	498,319	448,666	383,758		4,438,885				
Turnout		78.48%	85.15%	84.77%	86.50%	84.74%	84.62%	86.33%	83.91%		88.99%				

The following candidates were elected:

- State seats - Franziska Bennemann (SPD); Wilhelm Brese (CDU); Else Brökelschen (CDU); Johann Cramer (SPD); Jan Eilers (FDP); Alexander Elbrächter (DP); Egon Franke (SPD); Günter Frede (SPD); Carlo Graaff (FDP); Walter Harm (SPD); Gustav Heinemann (SPD); Pascual Jordan (CDU); Hans-Jürgen Junghans (SPD); Lisa Korspeter (SPD); Reinhold Kreitmeyer (FDP); Ernst Kuntscher (CDU); Fritz Logemann (DP); Johannes Lücke (SPD); Fritz Mensing (CDU); Moritz-Ernst Priebe (SPD); Helmut Rohde (SPD); Heinrich-Wilhelm Ruhnke (SPD); Heinrich Sander (FDP); Martin Schmidt (SPD); Kurt Schröder (SPD); Willy Steinmetz (DP); and Franz Varelmann (CDU).

Substitutions:

- Carlo Graaff (FDP) resigned on 8 May 1959 and was replaced by Herwart Miessner (FDP) on 21 May 1959.
- Walter Harm (SPD) resigned on 22 September 1961 and was replaced by Alfred Schliestedt (SPD) on 29 September 1961.

Additional state seats following vacation of constituency seats:

- Franz Blücher (DP, Göttingen – Münden) resgined on 28 February 1958 and was replaced by Georg Ripken (DP) on 10 March 1958.
- Ernst Pernoll (CDU, Harburg – Soltau) died on 15 July 1959 and was replaced by Rudolf Werner (CDU) on 24 July 1959.
- Adolf Cillien (CDU, Stadt Hannover-North) died on 29 April 1960 and was replaced by Elisabeth Vietje (CDU) on 6 May 1960.
- Hans Jahn (SPD, Hannover-Land) died on 10 July 1960 and was replaced by Ernst Rodiek (SPD) on 15 July 1960.

===== 1953 =====
Results of the 1953 federal election held on 6 September 1953:

Party		Second votes per region								Total votes	%	Seats		
Party		Aurich	Braun- schweig	Hanover	Hildes- heim	Lüne- burg	Olden- burg	Osna- brück	Stade	Total votes	%	Con.	Stat.	Tot.
Christian Democratic Union of Germany	CDU	66,824	209,119	235,467	186,261	155,981	176,325	220,728	80,277	1,330,982	35.21%	13	12	25
Social Democratic Party of Germany	SPD	65,955	166,297	313,133	194,754	126,013	97,798	80,633	91,939	1,136,522	30.06%	11	10	21
German Party	DP	5,468	43,459	116,146	43,723	110,323	17,375	20,093	92,616	449,203	11.88%	8	0	8
All-German Bloc/ League of Expellees and Deprived of Rights	GB/BHE	11,049	51,052	80,045	72,149	83,349	40,425	28,509	40,393	406,971	10.76%	0	7	7
Free Democratic Party	FDP	20,230	18,733	44,070	60,727	23,210	66,119	16,002	11,803	260,894	6.90%	2	3	5
Deutsche Reichspartei	DRP	14,466	8,726	32,050	15,426	27,125	15,387	7,438	11,439	132,057	3.49%	0	0	0
Communist Party of Germany	KPD	3,588	6,745	9,916	5,689	4,418	4,473	2,526	2,736	40,091	1.06%	0	0	0
All-German People's Party	GVP	1,496	2,523	5,782	3,308	2,596	2,159	3,714	2,298	23,876	0.63%	0	0	0
Valid votes		189,076	506,654	836,609	582,037	533,015	420,061	379,643	333,501	3,780,596	100.00%	34	32	66
Rejected votes		7,086	14,822	22,829	15,652	16,482	15,169	9,699	12,407	114,146	2.93%			
Total polled		196,162	521,476	859,438	597,689	549,497	435,230	389,342	345,908	3,894,742	88.74%			
Registered electors		240,332	583,312	966,499	654,412	616,546	498,001	433,755	395,961	4,388,818				
Turnout		81.62%	89.40%	88.92%	91.33%	89.13%	87.40%	89.76%	87.36%	88.74%				

The following candidates were elected:

- State seats - Franziska Bennemann (SPD); Wilhelm Brese (CDU); Else Brökelschen (CDU); Karl von Buchka (CDU); Martin Elsner (GB/BHE); Hans Egon Engell (GB/BHE); Erni Finselberger (GB/BHE); Heinz Frehsee (SPD); Hermann Friese (CDU); Horst Haasler (GB/BHE); Hans Hermsdorf (SPD); Johannes Kortmann (CDU); Herbert Kriedemann (SPD); Ernst Kuntscher (CDU); Walter Kutschera (GB/BHE); Fritz Mensing (CDU); Rudolf Meyer-Ronnenberg (GB/BHE); Herwart Miessner (FDP); Siegfried Moerchel (CDU); Wilhelm Naegel (CDU); Fritz Ohlig (SPD); Alfred Onnen (FDP); Moritz-Ernst Priebe (SPD); Heinrich-Wilhelm Ruhnke (SPD); J. Hermann Siemer (CDU); Ernst Srock (GB/BHE); Artur Stegner (FDP); Franz Varelmann (CDU); Elisabeth Vietje (CDU); Fritz Wenzel (SPD); Ernst Winter (SPD); and Otto Ziegler (SPD).

Substitutions

- Ernst Winter (SPD) died on 7 March 1954 and was replaced by Ferdinand Stümer (SPD) on 30 March 1954.
- Wilhelm Naegel (CDU) died on 24 May 1956 and was replaced by Johann Thies (CDU) on 30 May 1956.
- Otto Ziegler (SPD) died on 27 July 1956 and was replaced by Erich Leitow (SPD) on 3 August 1956.

Additional state seats following vacation of constituency seats:

- Hermann Ehlers (CDU, Delmenhorst – Wesermarsch) died on 29 October 1954 and was replaced by Wilhelm Lotze (CDU) on 1 November 1954.
- Heinrich Hellwege (DP, Stade – Bremervörde) resigned on 27 May 1955 and was replaced by Margot Kalinke (DP) on 3 June 1955.
- Robert Dannemann (FDP, Oldenburg) resigned on 1 July 1955 and was replaced by Carlo Graaff (FDP) on 4 July 1955.

==== 1940s ====
===== 1949 =====
Results of the 1949 federal election held on 14 August 1949:

Party		Votes	%	Seats		
Party		Votes	%	Con.	Stat.	Tot.
Social Democratic Party of Germany	SPD	1,125,295	33.43%	24	0	24
German Party	DP	597,542	17.75%	5	7	12
Christian Democratic Union of Germany	CDU	593,691	17.64%	4	8	12
Independents	Ind	273,296	8.12%	0	0	0
German Conservative Party–German Right Party	DKP-DRP	273,129	8.11%	0	5	5
Free Democratic Party	FDP	252,141	7.49%	1	4	5
Centre Party	Z	113,464	3.37%	0	0	0
Communist Party of Germany	KPD	104,132	3.09%	0	0	0
Radical Social Freedom Party	RSF	33,275	0.99%	0	0	0
Valid votes		3,365,965	100.00%	34	24	58
Rejected votes		73,999	2.15%			
Total polled		3,439,964	77.73%			
Registered electors		4,425,610				

The following candidates were elected:

- State seats - Wilhelm Brese (CDU); Else Brökelschen (CDU); Fritz Dorls* (DKP-DRP); Hermann Ehlers (CDU); Ernst Farke (DP); Heinz Frommhold (DKP-DRP); Walther Hasemann (FDP); Margot Kalinke (DP); Friedrich Klinge (DP); Christian Kuhlemann (DP); Ernst Kuntscher (CDU); Erich Langer (FDP); Fritz Mensing (CDU); Herwart Miessner (DKP-DRP); Hans Mühlenfeld (DP); Wilhelm Naegel (CDU); Alfred Onnen (FDP); Franz Richter (DKP-DRP); Kurt Schmücker (CDU); Hans-Christoph Seebohm (DP); Artur Stegner (FDP); Adolf von Thadden (DKP-DRP); Peter Tobaben (DP); and Oskar Wackerzapp (CDU).

* Fritz Dorls (DKP-DRP) forfeited his seat in the Bundestag on 23 October 1952 due to his membership of the proscribed Socialist Reich Party but was not replaced.

Substitutions:

- Friedrich Klinge (DP) died on 21 December 1949 and was replaced by Carl von Campe (DP) on 23 January 1950.
- Carl von Campe (DP) resigned on 8 January 1952 and was replaced by Robert Jaffé (DP) on 9 January 1952.
- Franz Richter (DKP-DRP) resigned on 21 February 1952 and was replaced by Elfriede Jaeger (DKP-DRP) on 29 February 1952.
- Hans Mühlenfeld (DP) resigned on 15 May 1953 and was replaced by Ernst Woltje (DP) on 30 May 1953.

Additional state seats following vacation of constituency seats: (Note: Prior to 1953 vacant constituency seats were replaced by holding a by-election.)

- Bernard Povel (CDU, Emsland) died on 21 October 1952 and was replaced by Hermann A. Eplée (CDU) on 16 January 1953.
