= Broll =

Broll may refer to:

- Broll, a by-product of wheat milling
- Broll, a surname
- B-roll, the supplemental or alternate footage intercut with the main shot in an interview or documentary
- David Broll, Canadian ice hockey player
- Werner Broll (born 1932), German politician
