= Kever =

Kever may refer to:

- A tomb or grave
- Hein Kever (1854–1922), Dutch painter
- Rocco Kever (born 1979), German politician
