= Vivian Tauschwitz =

German politician (born 1994)

Member of the Bundestag
- Incumbent
- Assumed office March 2025
- Constituency: Lower Saxony

Personal details
- Born: 29 July 1994 (age 31)
- Party: Christian Democratic Union

Vivian Tauschwitz (born 29 July 1994) is a German politician who was elected as a member of the Bundestag in 2025. She is a municipal councillor of Bispingen.
