= Olaf Hilmer =

German politician (born 1972)

Member of the Bundestag
- Incumbent
- Assumed office 25 March 2025
- Constituency: Lower Saxony

Personal details
- Born: 17 February 1972 (age 54)
- Party: Alternative for Germany (since 2022)

Olaf Hilmer (born 17 February 1972) is a German politician who was elected as a member of the Bundestag in 2025. He has been a member of the Alternative for Germany since 2022.
