= Mirco Hanker =

German politician (born 1966)

Member of the Bundestag
- Incumbent
- Assumed office 25 March 2025
- Constituency: Lower Saxony

Personal details
- Born: 2 February 1966 (age 60) Braunschweig
- Party: Alternative for Germany (since 2016)
- Other political affiliations: Free Voters (formerly)

Mirco Karsten Hanker (born 2 February 1966) is a German politician who was as a elected member of the Bundestag in 2025. He has been a member of the Alternative for Germany since 2016, and was previously a member of Free Voters.

Hanker completed his Abitur in 1986, and his military service from 1986 to 1987.

In the Bundestag, Hanker is a full member of the Budget Committee and the Subcommittee on European Union Affairs, as well as a deputy member of the Defence Committee.
