= Andreas Paul =

German politician (born 1978)

Member of the Bundestag
- Incumbent
- Assumed office 25 March 2025
- Constituency: Lower Saxony

Personal details
- Born: 10 October 1978 (age 47)
- Party: Alternative for Germany

Andreas Michael Paul (born 10 October 1978) is a German politician who was elected as a member of the Bundestag in 2025. He has served as city councillor of Oldenburg since 2021.
