= Anne-Mieke Bremer =

German politician

Member of the Bundestag
- Incumbent
- Assumed office 2025
- Constituency: Lower Saxony

Personal details
- Party: The Left

Anne-Mieke Bremer is a German politician belonging to The Left (Germany). In the 2025 German federal election, she was elected to the German Bundestag.
