= Maik Brückner =

German politician (born 1992)

Member of the Bundestag
- Incumbent
- Assumed office 2025
- Constituency: Lower Saxony

Personal details
- Born: 16 June 1992 (age 33) Weener, Germany
- Party: The Left
- Website: maik-brueckner.de

Maik Herbert Brückner (born 16 June 1992) is a German politician and member of the Bundestag. A member of The Left, he has represented Lower Saxony since 2025.

Brückner was born on 16 June 1992 in Weener. He was The Left's candidate in Hildesheim (constituency 48) at the 2025 federal election but was not elected. He was however elected to the Bundestag on The Left's state list in Lower Saxony.
