= Karoline Otte =

German politician (born 1996)

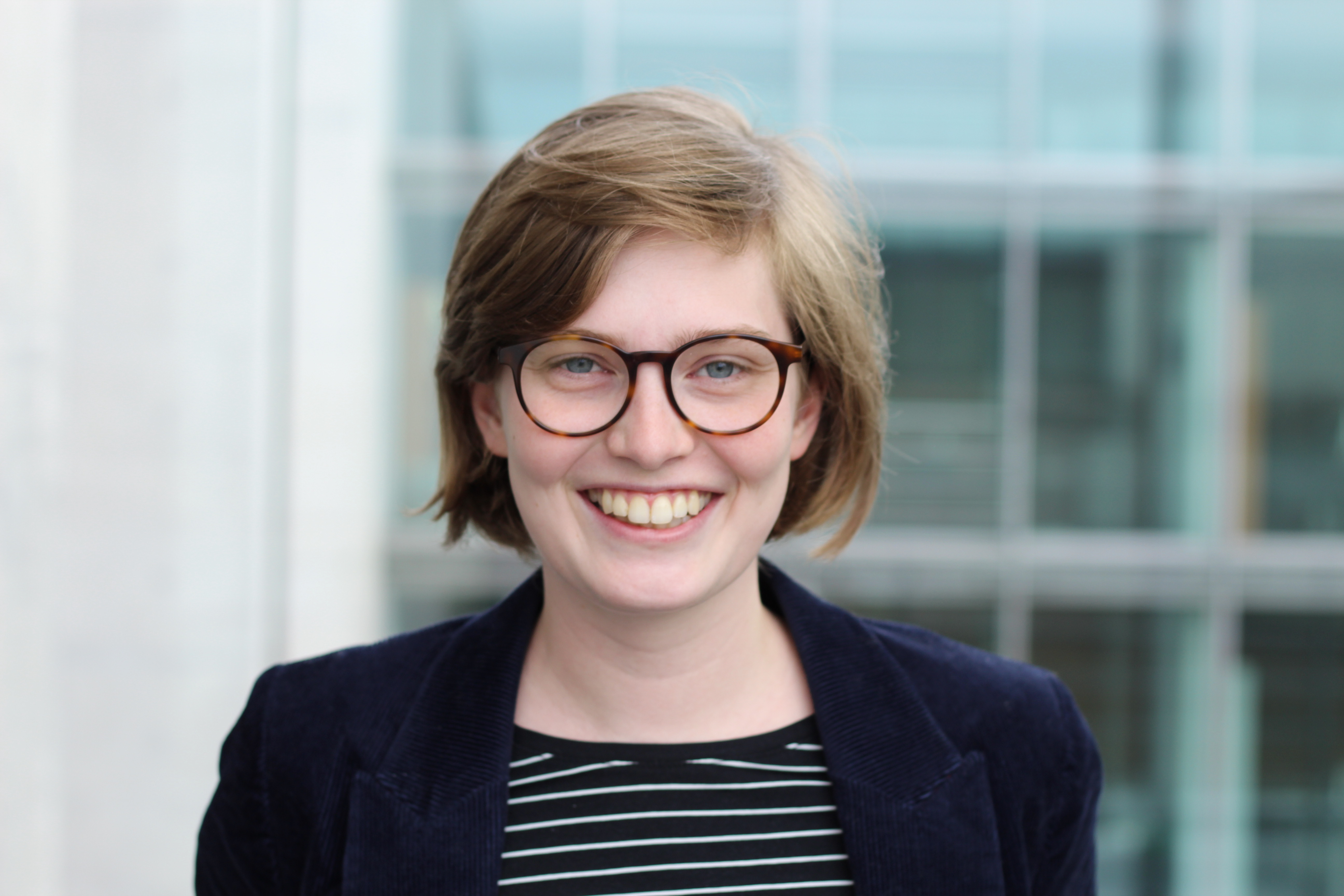
- Karoline Otte

Member of the Bundestag
- Incumbent
- Assumed office 26 October 2021
- Constituency: Lower Saxony

Personal details
- Born: 11 September 1996 (age 29) Göttingen, Germany
- Party: Alliance 90/The Greens

Karoline Otte (born 11 September 1996) is a German politician of Alliance 90/The Greens who has been serving as a member of the Bundestag since the 2021 German federal election.

== Political career ==
In parliament, Otte has been serving on the Committee on Tourism and the Committee on Housing, Urban Development, Building and Local Government.

== Other activities ==
- German United Services Trade Union (ver.di), Member
