= Micha Fehre =

German politician (born 1997)

Member of the Bundestag
- Incumbent
- Assumed office March 2025
- Constituency: Lower Saxony

Personal details
- Born: 18 April 1997 (age 29) Ingolstadt
- Party: Alternative for Germany

Micha Sebastian Fehre (born 18 April 1997 in Ingolstadt) is a German politician who was elected as a member of the Bundestag in 2025. He is a board member of the Alternative for Germany in Lower Saxony.
