= Martina Uhr =

German politician (born 1961)

Member of the Bundestag
- Incumbent
- Assumed office 25 March 2025
- Constituency: Lower Saxony

Personal details
- Born: 26 March 1961 (age 65)
- Party: Alternative for Germany (since 2017)

Martina Uhr (born 26 March 1961) is a German politician who was elected as a member of the Bundestag in 2025. She has been a member of the Alternative for Germany since 2017.

In February 2026 she accused the leader of the AfD in Lower Saxony of fraud and authoritarian behavior, but faced calls for her resignation and attempts to oust her from the party after leaked documents suggested she was guilty of nepotism herself, having put her partner and her daughter on the party's payroll.
