= Jorrit Bosch =

German politician (born 1997)

Member of the Bundestag
- Incumbent
- Assumed office 2025
- Constituency: Lower Saxony

Personal details
- Born: 8 September 1997 (age 29) Lüneburg, Germany
- Party: The Left

Jorrit Lucca Bosch (born 8 September 1997) is a German politician and member of the Bundestag. A member of The Left, he has represented Lower Saxony since 2025.

== Early life and education ==
Bosch was born on 8 September 1997 in Lüneburg. He later lived in Göttingen for a few months after leaving school before moving to Braunschweig in 2019. He studied social sciences in the city.

== Career ==
After graduating he worked in the Braunschweig office of Bundestag member Victor Perli. He is a member of the ver.di trade union, Forum Against the Right e.V. (Forum gegen Rechts e.V.) and REFUGIUM Refugee Aid e.V. (REFUGIUM Flüchtlingshilfe e.V.).

Bosch has been a member of The Left since 2019 and has been joint chairman of its Braunschweig district branch since February 2023. He was elected to the Bundestag at the 2025 federal election on The Left's state list in Lower Saxony.
