= Franziska Bennemann =

German politician (1905–1986)

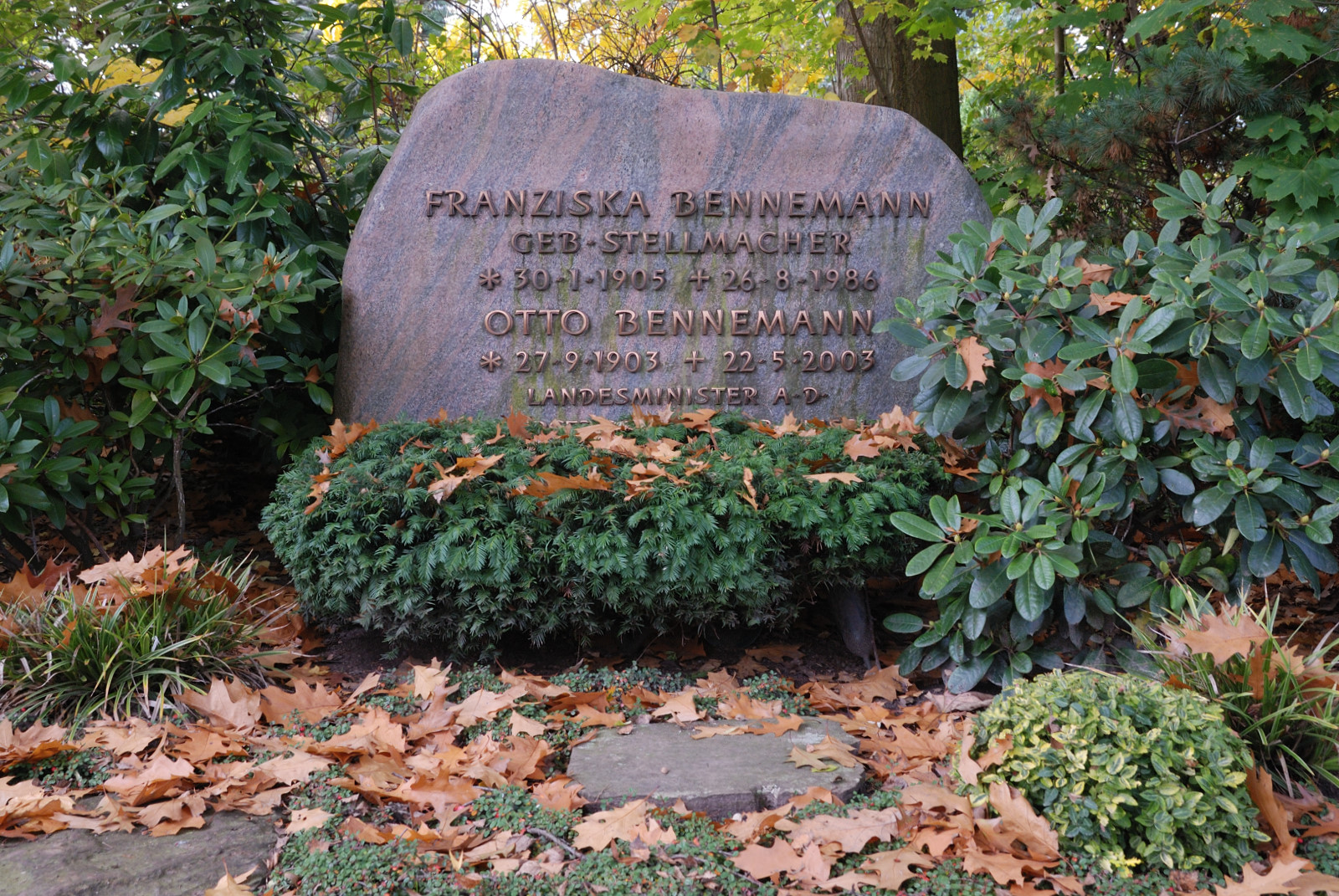
- Gravestone of Franziska and Otto Bennemann in the city cemetery in Braunschweig

Member of the Bundestag
- In office 1953–1961

Personal details
- Born: 30 January 1905
- Died: 26 August 1986 (aged 81)
- Party: SPD

Franziska Bennemann (née Stellmacher) (January 30, 1905 – August 26, 1986) was a German politician. An anti-Nazi trade unionist, she fled Germany during World War II, and later served in Bundestag from 1953 to 1961.

== Biography ==
She was born in Hermsdorf in Landkreis Friedeberg Nm. (now part of western Poland) in 1905. After her regular schooling, she attended the Landerziehungsheim Walkemühle in Melsungen, where she studied economics, natural sciences, and philosophy from 1925 to 1929. She joined the Sozialistische Arbeiter-Jugend (Socialist Working Youth) and the SPD in 1923. She joined the Internationaler Sozialistischer Kampfbund in 1926, and led a youth group there from 1929 to 1931. Her anti-Nazi work caused her to lose jobs. She continued to distribute illegal ISK literature, and moved to Berlin in 1938 and attended a technical school.

She knew Otto Bennemann from the Walkemühle school and ISK, and married him in 1934. She moved to English in January 1939 (after Otto did in 1938) on a domestic work visa. She did that work until 1941, then attended a technical school in Guildford, and then worked until 1944 as a lab assistant. She joined the "Landesgruppe deutscher Gewerkschafter" (an exile anti-Nazi unionist group) in 1941, and the England branch of the ISK in 1943.

She returned to Germany in 1946, returned to union group activities, and joined the SPD. She served in the Bundestag from 1953 to 1961 for the Lower Saxony electoral district.

She died in 1986, and Otto died in 2003. Bennemannstraße in the Östliches Ringgebiet district of Braunschweig is named after them.

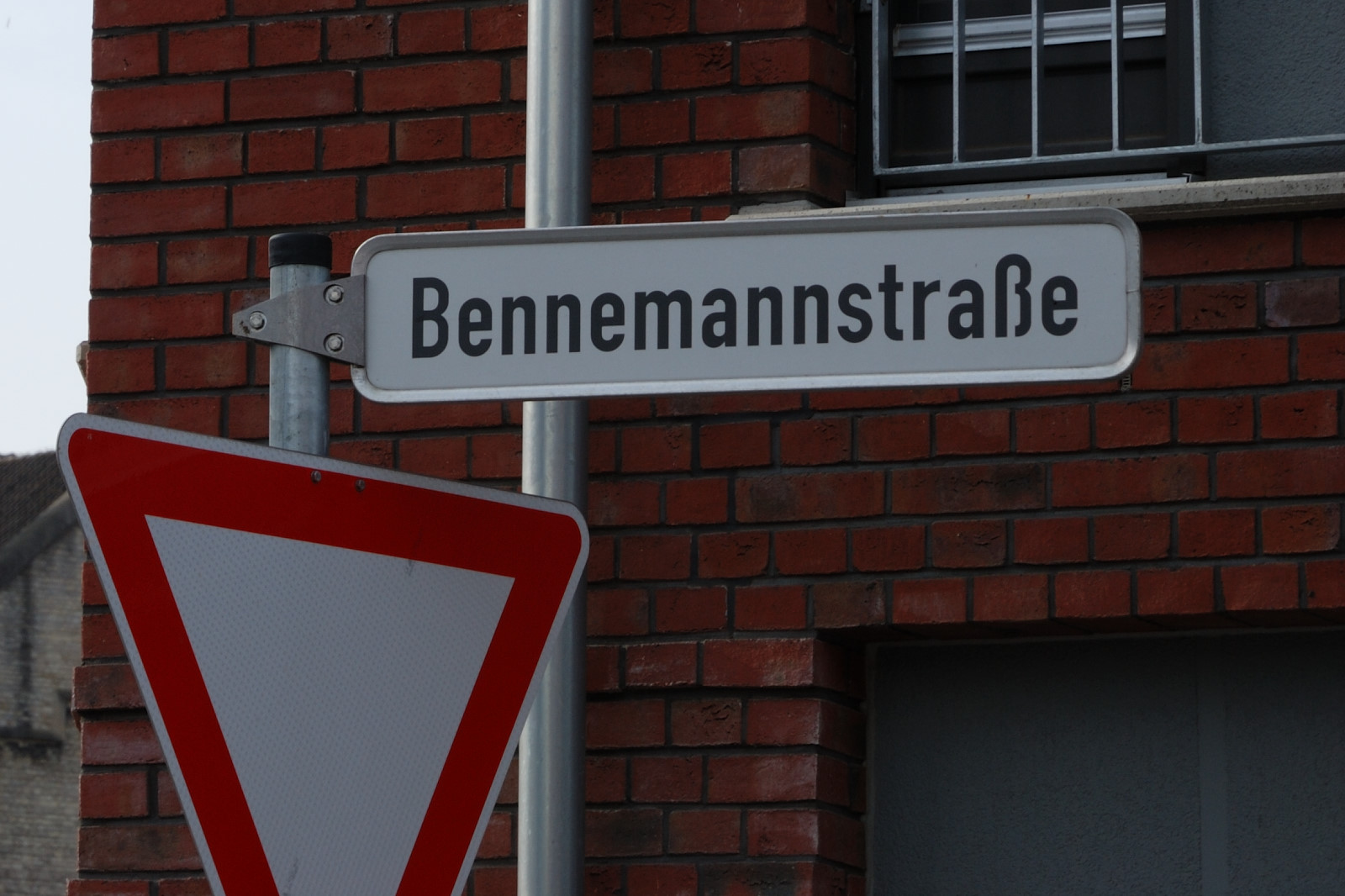
Bennemann Street in Braunschweig

Otto founded the Otto-und Franziska-Bennemann-Stiftung (Otto and Franziska Bennemann Foundation) in 1994.
