= Angela Rudzka =

German politician (born 1984)

Member of the Bundestag
- Incumbent
- Assumed office 25 March 2025
- Constituency: Lower Saxony

Personal details
- Born: 20 January 1984 (age 42)
- Party: Alternative for Germany

Angela Rudzka (born 20 January 1984) is a German politician who was elected as a member of the Bundestag in 2025. She previously served as consultant on labour, social affairs, health and equality to the Alternative for Germany group in the Landtag of Lower Saxony.
