= Stefan Henze (politician) =

German politician (born 1965)

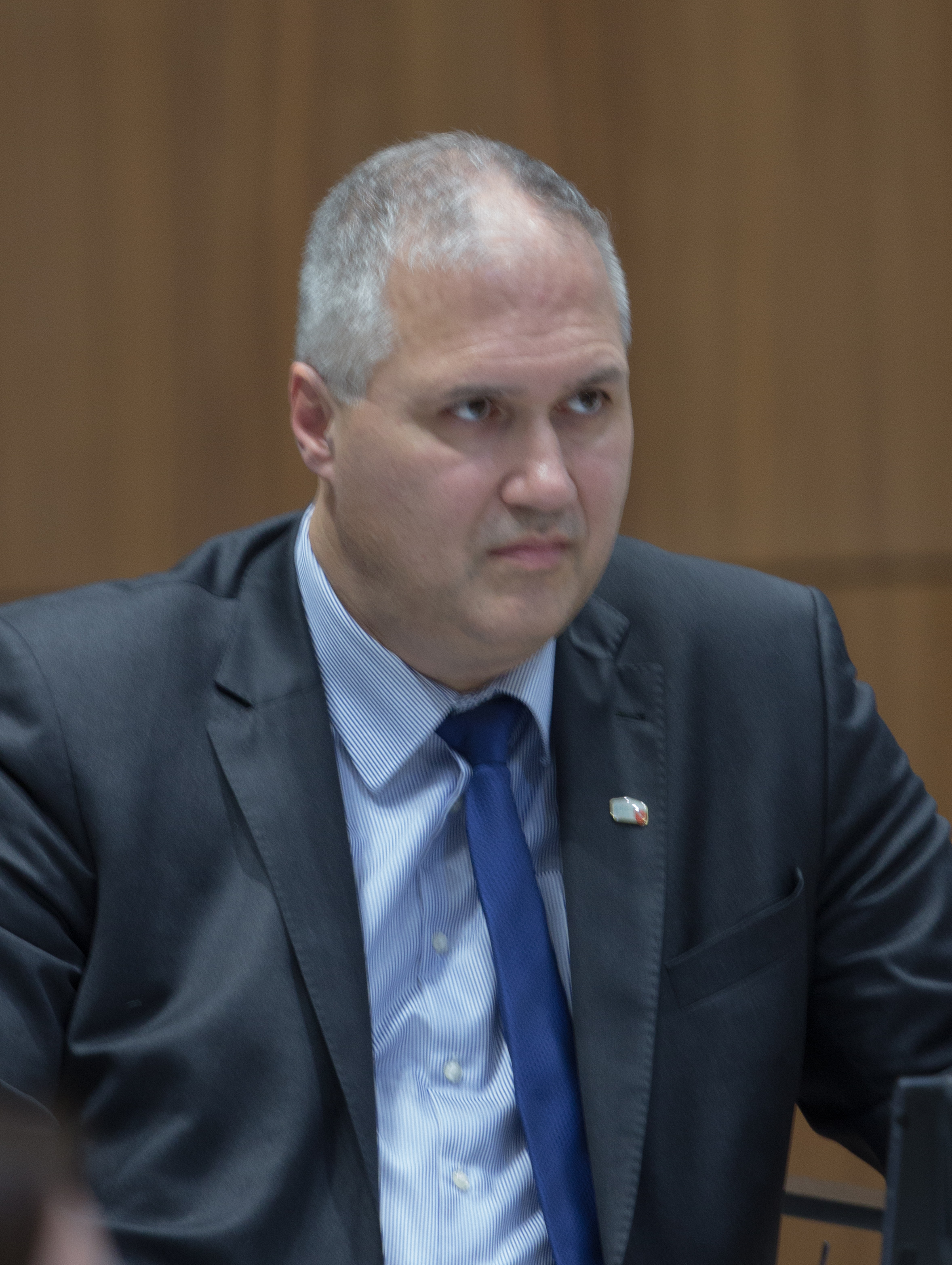
- Henze in 2018

Member of the Bundestag
- Incumbent
- Assumed office 25 March 2025
- Constituency: Lower Saxony

Member of the Landtag of Lower Saxony
- In office 14 November 2017 – 8 November 2022

Personal details
- Born: 17 July 1965 (age 60)
- Party: Alternative for Germany (since 2013)

Stefan Henze (born 17 July 1965) is a German politician who was elected as a member of the Bundestag in 2025. From 2017 to 2022, he was a member of the Landtag of Lower Saxony.
