= Danny Meiners =

German politician (born 1979)

Member of the Bundestag
- Incumbent
- Assumed office 25 March 2025
- Constituency: Lower Saxony

Personal details
- Born: 2 January 1979 (age 47)
- Party: Alternative for Germany (since 2015)

Danny Meiners (born 2 January 1979) is a German politician who was elected as a member of the Bundestag in 2025. He has been a member of the Alternative for Germany since 2015.
