= Monika Brüning =

German politician (1951 – 2022)

- Born: 13 July 1951; Bremen, Germany
- Died: 12 December 2022 (aged 71); Wunstorf, Germany

Monika Brüning (13 July 1951 – 12 December 2022) was a German politician and member of the Christian Democratic Union.
