= Marcel Queckemeyer =

German politician (born 1980)

Member of the Bundestag
- Incumbent
- Assumed office TBD

Member of the Landtag of Lower Saxony
- Incumbent
- Assumed office 8 November 2022

Personal details
- Born: 14 September 1980 (age 45)
- Party: Alternative for Germany

Marcel Queckemeyer (born 14 September 1980) is a German politician serving as a member of the Landtag of Lower Saxony since 2021. In the 2025 federal election, he was elected as a member of the Bundestag.
