= Odal von Alten-Nordheim =

German politician

Member of the Bundestag
- In office 20 October 1969 – 13 December 1976

Personal details
- Born: 21 May 1922 Holzminden
- Died: 28 July 2004 (aged 82)
- Party: CDU
- Occupation: Farmer

Odal von Alten-Nordheim (May 21, 1922 – July 28, 2004) was a German politician of the Christian Democratic Union (CDU) and former member of the German Bundestag.

== Life ==
Alten-Nordheim was a member of the CDU. He was a member of the municipal council of Wormsthal and the district council of the district of Schaumburg. In the 1969 federal election he was elected to the German Bundestag via the state list of the CDU Lower Saxony, to which he belonged until 1976.

== Literature ==
Herbst, Ludolf; Jahn, Bruno (2002). Vierhaus, Rudolf (ed.). Biographisches Handbuch der Mitglieder des Deutschen Bundestages. 1949–2002 [Biographical Handbook of the Members of the German Bundestag. 1949–2002] (in German). München: De Gruyter - De Gruyter Saur. p. 1715. ISBN 978-3-11-184511-1.
