= Else Brökelschen =

German politician (1890–1976)

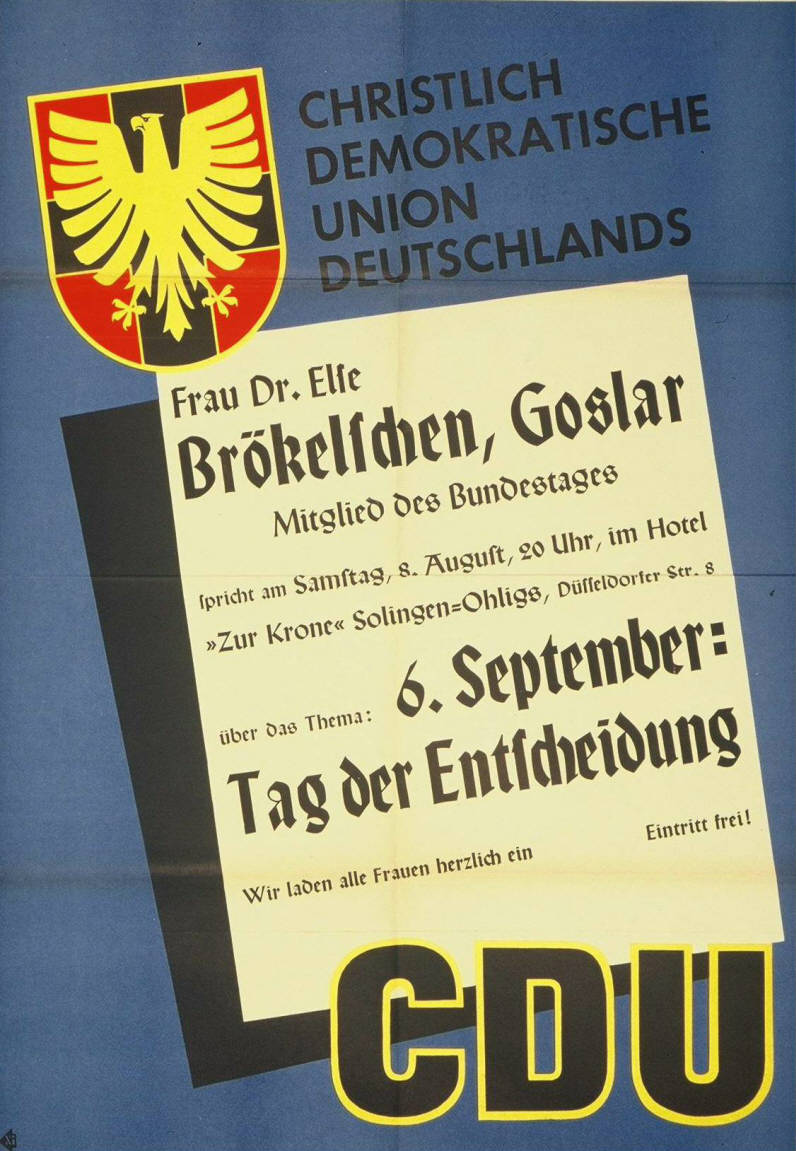
- Election campaign poster by Else Brökelschen (1953)

Member of the Bundestag
- In office 7 September 1949 – 15 October 1961

Personal details
- Born: 25 June 1890 Barmen
- Died: 22 October 1976 (aged 86) Goslar, Germany
- Party: CDU

Else Brökelschen (25 June 1890 in Barmen – 22 October 1976 in Goslar) was a German politician of the Christian Democratic Union (CDU) and former member of the German Bundestag.

== Life ==
In 1945 she and others founded the CDU in Goslar and represented the party in the city council there from 1946 to 1950. After that, she was a member of the German Bundestag from the first federal election in 1949 to 1961, where she was always elected to the party's Lower Saxony state list.

== Literature ==
Herbst, Ludolf; Jahn, Bruno (2002). Vierhaus, Rudolf (ed.). Biographisches Handbuch der Mitglieder des Deutschen Bundestages. 1949–2002 [Biographical Handbook of the Members of the German Bundestag. 1949–2002] (in German). München: De Gruyter - De Gruyter Saur. p. 1715. ISBN 978-3-11-184511-1.
