= Dirk Brandes =

German politician (born 1974)

Member of the Bundestag
- Incumbent
- Assumed office 2021

Personal details
- Born: 25 May 1974 (age 51) Langenhagen
- Party: AfD

Dirk Brandes (born 25 May 1974) is a German politician for the AfD and since 2021 member of the Bundestag, the federal diet.

== Life and politics ==
Brandes was born 1974 in the West German town of Langenhagen and was elected to the Bundestag in 2021.

Dirk Brandes is one of the main acteurs of the lower-saxony far-right network „Pegasus Germanus“, which is part of former Der Flügel within AfD. The group is under constant observation by Federal Office for the Protection of the Constitution ("Beobachtungsfall").
