= Günther Bredehorn =

German politician

Member of the Bundestag
- In office 4 November 1980 – 26 October 1998

Personal details
- Born: 11 December 1935 (age 90) Wilhelmshaven
- Party: FDP

Günther Bredehorn (born 11 December 1935) was a German politician of the Free Democratic Party (FDP) and former member of the German Bundestag.

== Life ==
Bredehorn has been a member of the FDP since 1977. From 1980 to 1986, he was chairman of the FDP District Parliamentary Group in the district of Friesland, and from 1991 to 1996 he was deputy district administrator of the district. He was a member of the German Bundestag from 1980 to 1998, where he was the spokesman on agricultural policy for the FDP parliamentary group.

== Literature ==
Herbst, Ludolf; Jahn, Bruno (2002). Vierhaus, Rudolf (ed.). Biographisches Handbuch der Mitglieder des Deutschen Bundestages. 1949–2002 [Biographical Handbook of the Members of the German Bundestag. 1949–2002] (in German). München: De Gruyter - De Gruyter Saur. p. 1715. ISBN 978-3-11-184511-1.
