= Vera Dominke =

German politician (born 1953)

Vera Dominke (born 23 September 1953 in Hildesheim) served as a member of the German Bundestag from 2002 to 2005 for the Christian Democratic Union party. She was one of the very rare female presidents of a polytechnic university in Northern Germany from September 2006 until December 2008, when she was voted out by the school's senate, despite students' protests.

Dominke studied social sciences and law, graduating as a jurist with the Staatsexamen. Her positions included roles in the administration of the German federal state Lower Saxony, where she worked for the state audit office of (1992–1998), the Lower Saxony ministry for women's affairs (1990–1992) and the state's ministry of science (1999–2002).
