= Rocco Kever =

German politician (born 1979)

Member of the Bundestag
- Incumbent
- Assumed office 25 March 2025
- Constituency: Lower Saxony

Personal details
- Born: 31 December 1979 (age 46)
- Party: Alternative for Germany (since 2014)

Rocco Kever (born 31 December 1979) is a German politician who was elected as a member of the Bundestag in 2025. He has been a member of the Alternative for Germany since 2014.
