= Anne Janssen =

German politician

Anne Janssen (born 31 August 1982 in Jever) is a German politician for the CDU and since 2021 has been a member of the Bundestag. She entered the parliament in 6th place on the state list of the CDU Lower Saxony.

== Life ==
Janssen was born 1982 in the West German town of Jever and grew up in neighboring Wittmund. After graduating from high school, she trained as a nurse at Wittmund Hospital. She then worked in the hospital and in outpatient care before studying to become a teacher in Oldenburg. Following her graduation, she worked as a primary school teacher at the Finkenburg School in Wittmund. Janssen is married and has three children. She is of the Lutheran denomination.

== MP ==
Janssen was elected to the Bundestag in 2021. In the Bundestag, Janssen is a full member of the Family Affairs Committee. In addition, she is a deputy member of the Health Committee, as well as the Committee on Tourism.
