= Wilfried Bohlsen =

German politician (1934–2016)

Member of the Bundestag
- In office 29 March 1983 – 10 November 1994

Personal details
- Born: 23 November 1934 Wilhelmshaven
- Died: 15 June 2016 (aged 81) Wiesmoor, Lower Saxony, Germany
- Party: CDU

Wilfried Bohlsen (November 23, 1934 – June 15, 2016) was a German politician of the Christian Democratic Union (CDU) and former member of the German Bundestag.

== Life ==
Bohlsen was a member of the CDU from 1971. In 1980 he took over the chairmanship of the CDU District Association of East Frisia.

Bohlsen entered the German Bundestag in the 1983 federal election via the state list of Lower Saxony. From 1983 to 1990, he was a full member of the Committee on Transport, of which he was a deputy member until 1994. From May 1989 to 1994 he was a member of the Committee on Budgets and from November 1991 to 1994 he was a member of the Committee on Tourism. From 1990 to 1994 he was also a member of the Audit Committee. He did not run again for the 1994 Bundestag elections.

== Literature ==
Herbst, Ludolf; Jahn, Bruno (2002). Vierhaus, Rudolf (ed.). Biographisches Handbuch der Mitglieder des Deutschen Bundestages. 1949–2002 [Biographical Handbook of the Members of the German Bundestag. 1949–2002] (in German). München: De Gruyter - De Gruyter Saur. p. 1715. ISBN 978-3-11-184511-1.
