= Ursula Benedix =

German politician (1922–2014)

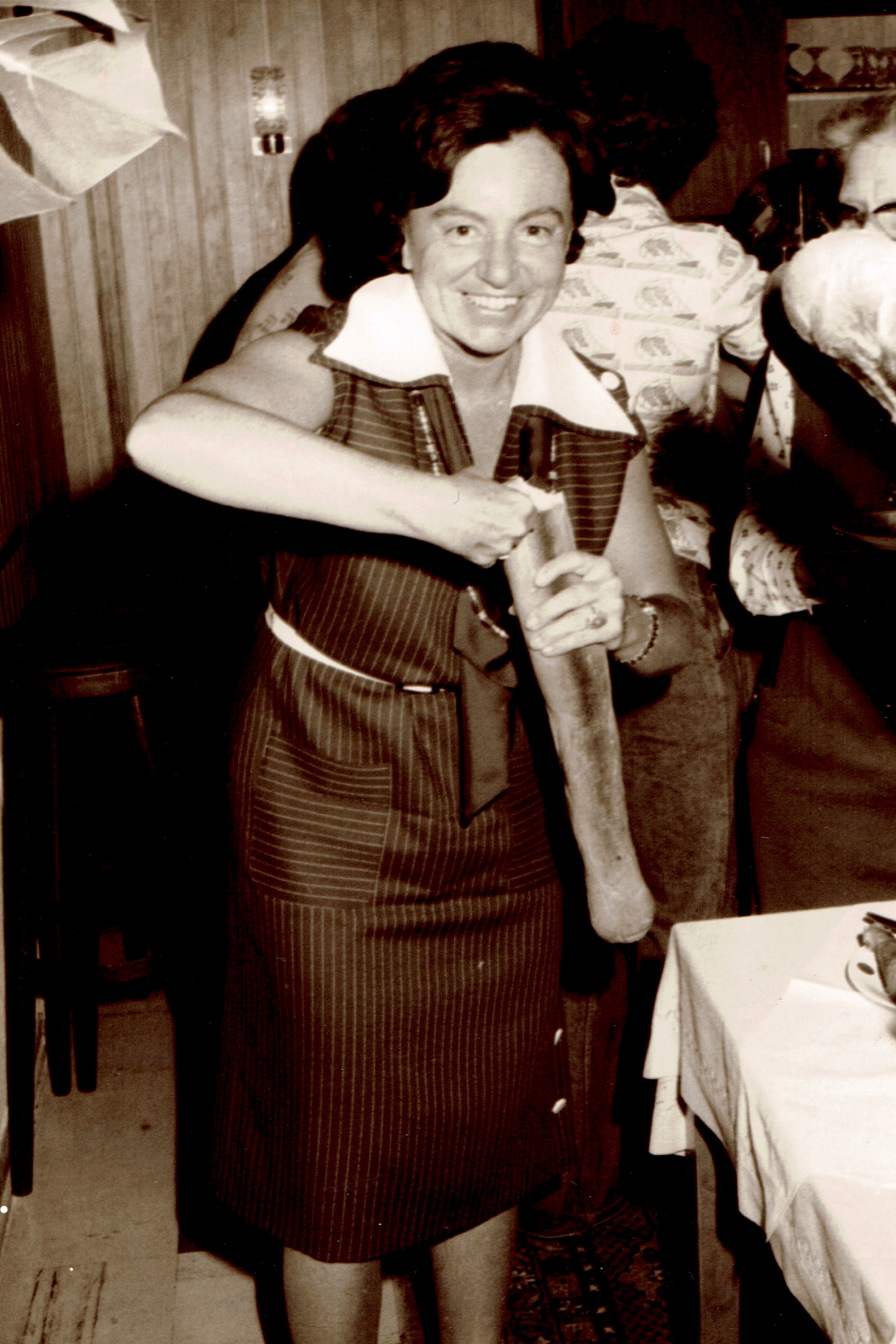
- Ursula Benedix probably at a CDU event in 1975

Member of the Bundestag
- In office 13 December 1972 – 29 March 1983

Personal details
- Born: 12 September 1922 Neurode
- Died: 17 May 2014 (aged 91) Emden, Lower Saxony, Germany
- Party: CDU

Ursula Benedix (12 September 1922 – 17 May 2014) was a German politician of the Christian Democratic Union (CDU) and former member of the German Bundestag.

== Life ==
Benedix joined the CDU in 1953 and was a member of the party's district and regional executive committee. On 5 May 1967, she moved for the first time into the state parliament of Lower Saxony, to which she belonged in the sixth and seventh legislative periods from 5 May 1967 to 24 January 1973. There she was spokesperson for cultural policy and also a member of the parliamentary party council. On 24 January 1973 she left the state parliament because she had been elected to the German Bundestag in the previous year's federal election via the state list of Lower Saxony. She was a member of the German Bundestag for a total of three election periods, from the seventh to the ninth; she was elected via the state list of Lower Saxony in each case. She was a member of the Committee for Education and Science in all three terms, in the ninth even as deputy chairperson of this committee.

== Literature ==
Herbst, Ludolf; Jahn, Bruno (2002). Vierhaus, Rudolf (ed.). Biographisches Handbuch der Mitglieder des Deutschen Bundestages. 1949–2002 [Biographical Handbook of the Members of the German Bundestag. 1949–2002] (in German). München: De Gruyter - De Gruyter Saur. p. 1715. ISBN 978-3-11-184511-1.
