= Claudia Winterstein =

German politician

Member of the Bundestag
- In office 2003–2012

Personal details
- Born: Claudia Beyer; 18 March 1950 (age 76) Berlin

Claudia Winterstein (née Beyer; born 18 March 1950) is a German politician. She served as Member of the Bundestag for the Free Democratic Party (FDP) from 2002 to 2013, and was her party's Parliamentary Secretary between 2005 and 2009. She served multiple terms on the Hannover city council, and also worked as a certified economy correspondent, a lecturer, a research assistant, and a property management executive.

== Life ==
Claudia Beyer was born in Berlin. She achieved the Abitur at the humanistic Gymnasium Steglitz in Berlin-Steglitz. She trained to be a certified economy correspondent (Wirtschaftskorrespondentin) for English and Spanish. Beyer intended to become an architect, but found the field in West Berlin to be saturated with architects and short on available property lots, due to the Berlin Wall. She instead studied pedagogy at the Pädagogische Hochschule Berlin (PH), graduating with the Diplom. She worked from 1972 as correspondent for the foreign department of a wholesaler, moving the following year to a position as research assistant of the Deutsche Gesellschaft für die Vereinten Nationen (German society for the United Nations). She then became its CEO for the Berlin region from 1976 to 1979. She also lectured from 1977 to 1979 at the PH Berlin at the chair of Bildungsplanung.

From 1980, Winterstein worked in her husband's architecture firm in Hannover, as the executive of the property management department. She earned a doctorate from the Freie Universität Berlin in 1984, with a dissertation entitled "Migrantenintegration qua Bildungsplanung", about planning an education system to integrate Turkish children in West Berlin, in theory and practice.

Winterstein joined the Free Democratic Party (FDP) in 1980. From 1996 to 2003, she was deputy president of the party's women's organisation in Lower Saxony. She was a member of the state board (Landesvorstand) there from 1994, and became president of the party district Hannover-Stadt in 1996, and also of the Hildesheim region in 2006. She was a member of the Hannover city council from 1991 to 1996, and again from 2001 to 2002, serving as deputy president of her party from 1995 to 1996, and as president from 2001 to 2002.

Winterstein was a member of the federal parliament, Mitglied des Deutschen Bundestages, from 2002 to 2013, where she served as party speaker for film politics, and as president of the workgroup for budget. She also was a member of the Budget Committee of the Bundestag and Obfrau in the committee for Rechnungsprüfung. She was a deputy member on the committee of culture and media. On 26 October 2009, Winterstein was elected as her party's Parlamentarische Geschäftsführerin.

Winterstein did not pursue a candidacy for the following election. She has worked in a freelance capacity in the field of politics advisory, for companies such as CargoBeamer from 2014 and Global Bridges from 2018.

=== Private life ===
Winterstein married in 1979; the couple has a son, born in 1985. She and her husband are separated.
