= Silke Stokar von Neuforn =

German politician

Silke Stokar von Neuforn (born 10 May 1953, Kleinvollstedt) is a German politician (Greens). She has been a member of the German Parliament since 2002. From 1994 to 2002 she was a member of the Parliament of Lower Saxony. She is divorced and has one daughter.
