= Ernst Kuntscher =

German politician

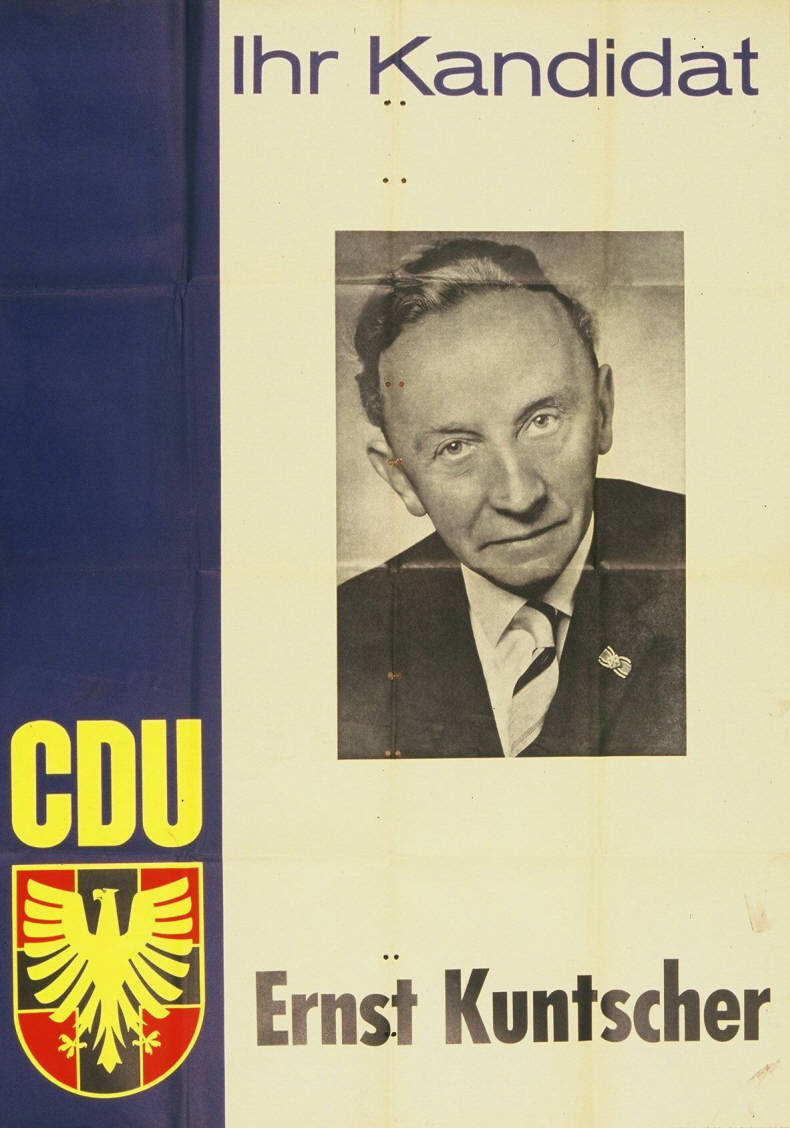
- Ernst Kuntscher on a campaign poster for the 1961 federal elections

Member of the Bundestag
- In office 7 September 1949 – 19 October 1969

Personal details
- Born: 7 January 1899 Bautsch, Austria-Hungary
- Died: 10 October 1971 (aged 72) Stade, West Germany
- Party: CDU

Ernst Kuntscher (7 January 1899 – 10 October 1971) was a German politician of the Christian Democratic Union (CDU) and former member of the German Bundestag.

== Life ==
In 1945 he participated in the foundation of the CDU. He was a member of the state parliament in Lower Saxony and also belonged to the district council in the district of Stade.

Kuntscher was a member of the German Bundestag since its first election in 1949 until 1969. He always entered parliament via the Lower Saxony state list of his party. From 9 July 1954 to 1961, he was chairman of the Bundestag Committee for Expellees, and from 1961 to 1965 of the Bundestag Committee for Equalization of Burdens.

== Literature ==
Herbst, Ludolf; Jahn, Bruno (2002). Vierhaus, Rudolf (ed.). Biographisches Handbuch der Mitglieder des Deutschen Bundestages. 1949–2002 [Biographical Handbook of the Members of the German Bundestag. 1949–2002] (in German). München: De Gruyter - De Gruyter Saur. p. 1715. ISBN 978-3-11-184511-1.
