= Werner Broll =

German politician (1932–2026)

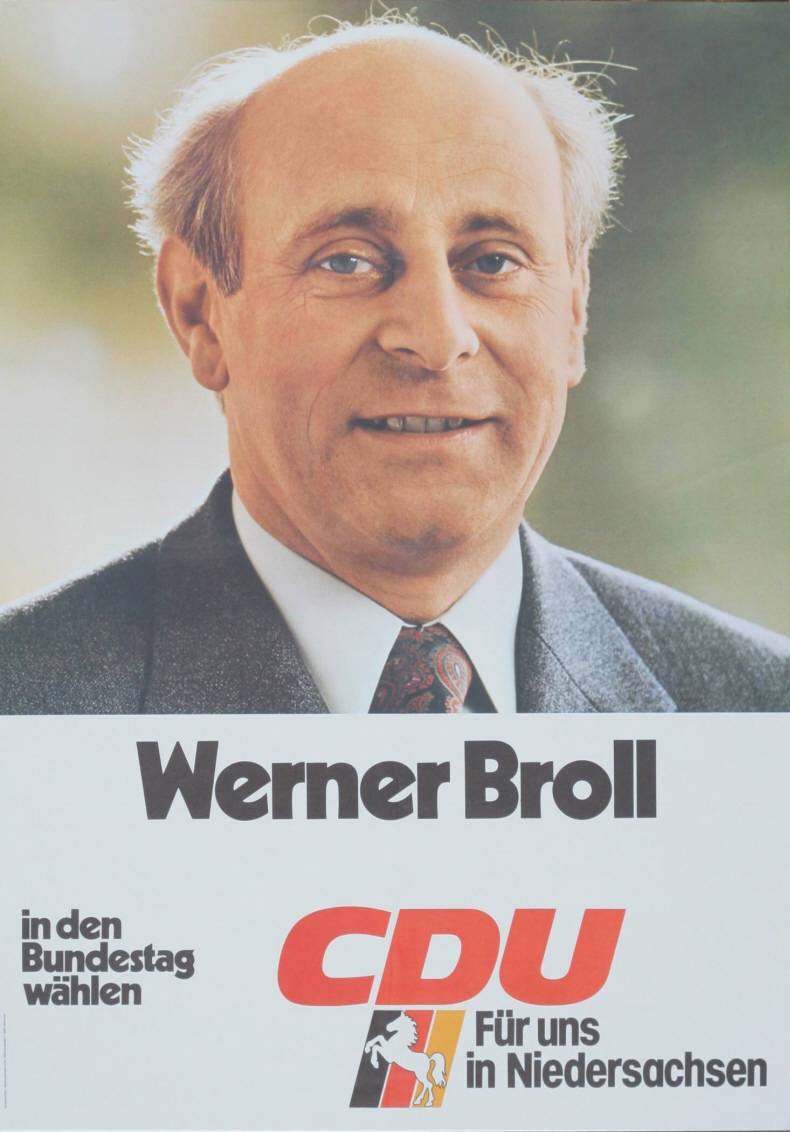
- Werner Broll's candidate poster for the 1980 federal elections

Member of the Bundestag
- In office 14 December 1976 – 18 February 1987

Personal details
- Born: 22 May 1932 Hanover, Province of Hanover, Prussia, Germany
- Died: 29 October 2026 (aged 94)
- Party: CDU

Werner Broll (22 May 1932 – 29 October 2026) was a German politician of the Christian Democratic Union (CDU) and onetime member of the German Bundestag.

== Life and career ==
Broll studied history and German language and literature in Munich and Münster, graduating with the First State Examination in 1956 and the Second State Examination in 1958. He then worked as a secondary school teacher in the teaching profession, most recently as a senior student councilor. From 1968 to 1977 Broll was a member of the council of the city of Oldenburg and from 1970 to 1987 chairman of the district CDU association. He was also a board member of the CDU regional association. From 1976 to 1987 Broll was then a member of the German Bundestag. He was always elected via the state list in Lower Saxony. In the Bundestag, he was deputy chairman of the Committee for Electoral Examination, Immunity and Rules of Procedure from 1982 to 1984.

Broll died on 29 October 2026, at the age of 94.

== Literature ==
Herbst, Ludolf; Jahn, Bruno (2002). Vierhaus, Rudolf (ed.). Biographisches Handbuch der Mitglieder des Deutschen Bundestages. 1949–2002 [Biographical Handbook of the Members of the German Bundestag. 1949–2002] (in German). Munich: De Gruyter - De Gruyter Saur. p. 1715. ISBN 978-3-11-184511-1.
