= Konstantin Kuhle =

German politician (born 1989)

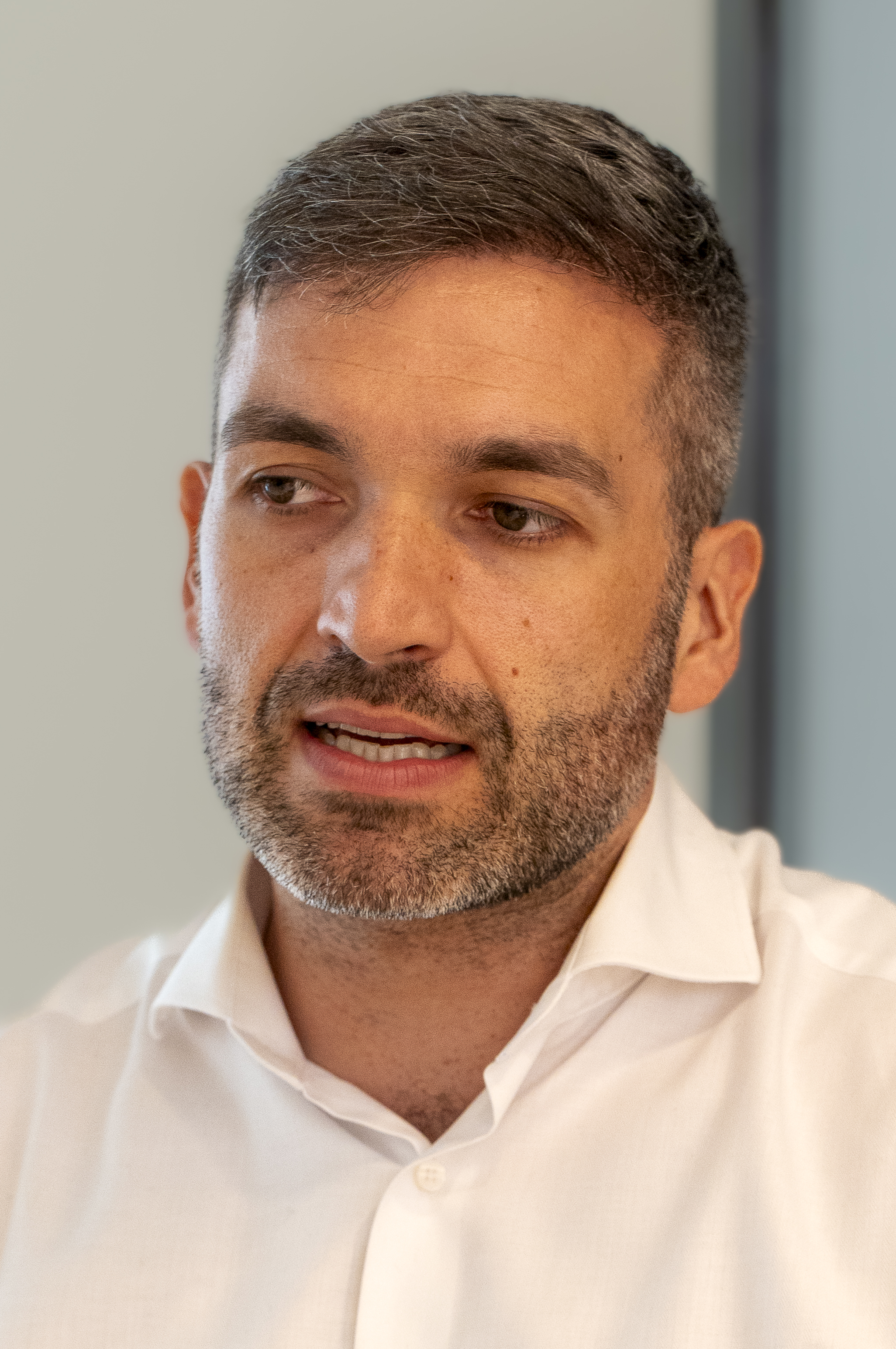
- Kuhle in 2025

Leader of the Free Democratic Party in Lower Saxony
- Incumbent
- Assumed office 11 March 2023
- General Secretary: Imke Haake
- Deputy: Gero Hocker; Anja Schulz; Jan-Christoph Oetjen
- Preceded by: Stefan Birkner

Member of the Bundestag
- In office 2017–2025

Personal details
- Born: Konstantin Elias Kuhle; 11 February 1989 (age 37) Wolfenbüttel, West Germany (now Germany)
- Party: FDP
- Education: Bucerius Law School

Konstantin Elias Kuhle (born 11 February 1989) is a German lawyer and politician of the Free Democratic Party (FDP) who has been chairing the party in Lower Saxony since 2023. From 2017 to 2025, he served as a member of the Bundestag from the state of Lower Saxony.

== Early life and career ==
Kuhle grew up in Eilensen and attended the Paul-Gerhardt-School in Dassel. After a year abroad in Ecuador, he graduated from high school in 2008 and subsequently worked as a civilian servant in a project for assisted living at the German Red Cross in Einbeck. In 2009 he began studying law at the Bucerius Law School in Hamburg and at the Sciences Po in Paris, which he completed with the first state examination in 2014. From 2009 to 2014 he was a scholarship holder of the German National Academic Foundation.

After his legal clerkship at the Hanseatic Higher Regional Court in Hamburg, Kuhle successfully passed the second state examination in April 2017. He worked as a lawyer in Hannover.

Since June 2025 Kuhle is married with his husband.

== Political career ==
=== Early beginnings ===
Kuhle has been a member of the Young Liberals since 2002 and has been a member of the FDP since 2005. From 2014 until 2018, he served as chairman of the Young Liberals.

=== Member of the German Parliament, 2017–2025 ===
Kuhle became a member of the Bundestag in the 2017 German federal election.

In parliament, Kuhle was a member of the Committee on Internal Affairs and the Committee on European Affairs from 2018 to 2021. He also served as his parliamentary group's spokesman for domestic policy. From 2022 to 2025, he was a member of the Parliamentary Oversight Panel (PKGr), which provides parliamentary oversight of Germany's intelligence services BND, BfV and MAD. That same year, he joined the Commission for the Reform of the Electoral Law and the Modernization of Parliamentary Work, co-chaired by Johannes Fechner and Nina Warken.

In addition to his committee assignments, Kuhle was a member of the German delegation to the Parliamentary Assembly of the Council of Europe (PACE) from 2018 to 2025. In the Assembly, he served on the Committee on Culture, Science, Education and Media; the Sub-Committee on Integration; the Sub-Committee on Education, Youth and Sport; and the Sub-Committee on Refugee and Migrant Children and Young People.

Kuhle was also part of a cross-party group in support of Schützenverein culture.

From 2021 to 2025, Kuhle served as one of six deputy chairpersons of the FDP parliamentary group under the leadership of its chairman Christian Dürr.

=== Career in state politics ===
From 2018 to 2023, Kuhle served as Secretary-General of the FDP in Lower Saxony, under the leadership of chairman Stefan Birkner. After the party's bad performance in the 2022 state elections, he succeeded Birkner.

== Other activities ==
- Islamkolleg Deutschland (IKD), Member of the Board (since 2021)

== Political positions ==
Amid the COVID-19 pandemic in Germany, Kuhle joined forces with five other parliamentarians – Gyde Jensen, Andrew Ullmann, Dieter Janecek, Kordula Schulz-Asche and Paula Piechotta – on a cross-party initiative in 2022 to support legislation that would require all those who have not had yet been vaccinated to receive counselling before later requiring all adults above 50 years to be vaccinated.
