= Dieter Janecek =

German politician (born 1976)

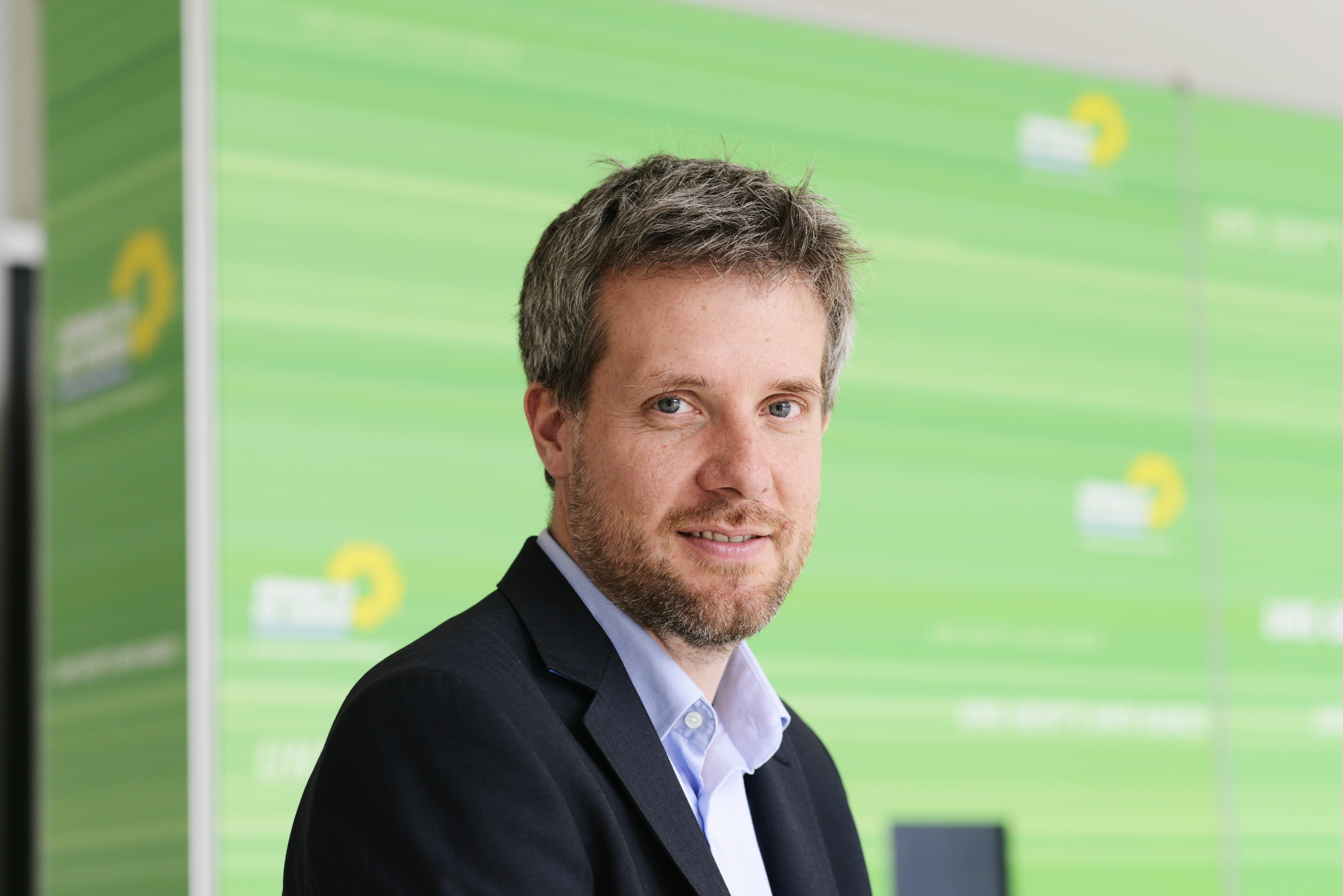
- Janecek in 2015

Member of the Bundestag
- In office 2013–2025

Personal details
- Born: 25 May 1976 (age 50) Pirmasens, West Germany
- Party: Alliance '90/The Greens

Dieter Gerald Janecek (born 25 May 1976) is a German politician of the Green Party (Alliance 90/The Greens) who served as a member of the German Parliament from 2013 to 2025. From 2008 to 2014 Janecek was chairman of the Bavarian Green Party.

In addition to his parliamentary mandate, Janecek served as the Coordinator for the Maritime Industry and Tourism at the Federal Ministry for Economic Affairs and Climate Action from 2023 to 2025.

== Early life and education ==
Janecek studied political science at the Bavarian School of Public Policy (HfP) in Munich.

== Political career ==
=== Career in state politics ===
In 2008, Janecek achieved via a verdict through the European Court of Justice that citizens under the impact of particulate pollution, could urge responsible authorities to reduce the pollution exceeding the legal threshold. As a consequence, Munich was forced to change its status quo and to establish a low-emission zone.

Janecek served as co-chair of the Green Party in Bavaria from 2008 until 2014, alongside Theresa Schopper (2008–2013) and Sigi Hagl (2013–2014); at the time, he was the youngest person to ever hold that position. He is also the founder of the nonpartisan transatlantic thinktank Die Transformateure.

=== Member of the German Bundestag, 2013–2025 ===
From the federal elections of 2013, Janecek was the Green Party candidate of the Munich constituency 221 München-West/Mitte. He has always received his seat in the Bundestag through his position on the Green electoral list.

In parliament, Janecek was a member of the Committee on Economic Affairs (2013–2025) as well as of the Committee on the Digital Agenda (2013–2021). He served as his parliamentary group's spokesperson on economic policy (2013–2017, 2021–2023), the digital economy (2018–present) and industrial policy (2019–2025). Janecek also served as a member of the Study Commission of the Bundestag on "Artificial Intelligence – Social Responsibility and Economic, Social and Ecological Potential".

In the negotiations to form a so-called traffic light coalition of the Social Democratic Party (SPD), the Green Party and the Free Democrats (FDP) following the 2021 German elections, Janecek was part of his party's delegation in the working group on innovation and research, co-chaired by Thomas Losse-Müller, Katharina Fegebank and Lydia Hüskens.

== Other activities ==
- Energy and Climate Policy and Innovation Council (EPICO), Member of the advisory board (since 2021)
- Baden-Badener Unternehmer-Gespräche (BBUG), Member of the Board of Trustees (since 2020)
- Bundesverband der Unternehmervereinigungen (BUV), Member of the Advisory Board
- Blockchain Bundesverband, Member of the Advisory Board
- Energy Watch Group (EWG), Member
- German Bioenergy Industry Association (BBE), Member of the Advisory Board
- German-Israeli Business Association, Member of the Board of Trustees
- Parlamentsgruppe Luft- und Raumfahrt, Member of the Board
- Verein Nationalpark Nordsteigerwald, Member of the Board of Trustees
- German Federation for the Environment and Nature Conservation (BUND), Member

== Political positions ==
Amid the COVID-19 pandemic in Germany, Janeck joined forces with five other parliamentarians – Gyde Jensen, Konstantin Kuhle, Andrew Ullmann, Kordula Schulz-Asche and Paula Piechotta – on a cross-party initiative in 2022 to support legislation that would require all those who have not had yet been vaccinated to receive counselling before later requiring all adults above 50 years to be vaccinated.
