= Würzburg (electoral district) =

Federal electoral district of Germany

Coordinates: 49°44′30″N 9°55′43″E

250 Würzburg
- Electoral district for the Bundestag
- Würzburg in 2025
- State: Bavaria
- Population: 290,200 (2019)
- Electorate: 222,633 (2025)
- Major settlements: Würzburg; Ochsenfurt
- Area: 1,055.9 km^{2}

Current electoral district
- Created: 1949
- Party: CSU
- Member: Hülya Düber
- Elected: 2025

Würzburg is an electoral constituency (German: Wahlkreis) represented in the Bundestag. It elects one member via first-past-the-post voting. Under the current constituency numbering system, it is designated as constituency 250. It is located in northwestern Bavaria, comprising the city of Würzburg and the district of Landkreis Würzburg.

Würzburg was created for the inaugural 1949 federal election. Since 2025, it has been represented by Hülya Düber of the Christian Social Union (CSU).

== Geography ==
Würzburg is located in northwestern Bavaria. As of the 2021 federal election, it comprises the independent city of Würzburg and the district of Landkreis Würzburg.

== History ==
Würzburg was created in 1949. In the 1949 election, it was Bavaria constituency 40 in the numbering system. In the 1953 through 1961 elections, it was number 235. In the 1965 through 1998 elections, it was number 237. In the 2002 and 2005 elections, it was number 252. In the 2009 through 2021 elections, it was number 251. From the 2025 election, it has been number 250.

Originally, the constituency comprised the independent city of Würzburg and the districts of Landkreis Würzburg, Ochsenfurt, and Marktheidenfeld. In the 1965 through 1972 elections, it lost the Marktheidenfeld district. It acquired its current borders in the 1976 election.

Election	No.	Name	Borders
1949	40	Würzburg	Würzburg city; Würzburg district; Ochsenfurt district; Marktheidenfeld district
1953	235	Würzburg	Würzburg city; Würzburg district; Ochsenfurt district; Marktheidenfeld district
1957	235	Würzburg	Würzburg city; Würzburg district; Ochsenfurt district; Marktheidenfeld district
1961	235	Würzburg	Würzburg city; Würzburg district; Ochsenfurt district; Marktheidenfeld district
1965	237	Würzburg	Würzburg city; Würzburg district; Ochsenfurt district
1969	237	Würzburg	Würzburg city; Würzburg district; Ochsenfurt district
1972	237	Würzburg	Würzburg city; Würzburg district; Ochsenfurt district
1976	237	Würzburg	Würzburg city; Würzburg district
1980	237	Würzburg	Würzburg city; Würzburg district
1983	237	Würzburg	Würzburg city; Würzburg district
1987	237	Würzburg	Würzburg city; Würzburg district
1990	237	Würzburg	Würzburg city; Würzburg district
1994	237	Würzburg	Würzburg city; Würzburg district
1998	237	Würzburg	Würzburg city; Würzburg district
2002	252	Würzburg	Würzburg city; Würzburg district
2005	252	Würzburg	Würzburg city; Würzburg district
2009	251	Würzburg	Würzburg city; Würzburg district
2013	251	Würzburg	Würzburg city; Würzburg district
2017	251	Würzburg	Würzburg city; Würzburg district
2021	251	Würzburg	Würzburg city; Würzburg district
2025	250	Würzburg	Würzburg city; Würzburg district

== Members ==
The constituency has been held continuously by the Christian Social Union (CSU) since its creation. It was first represented by Wilhelm Laforet from 1949 to 1953, followed by Karl Alfred Kihn from 1953 to 1961. Linus Memmel was representative from 1961 to 1976. Wolfgang Bötsch then served from 1976 to 2005, a total of eight consecutive terms. Paul Lehrieder has been representative since 2005.

Election	Member	Party	%
1949	Wilhelm Laforet	CSU	43.8
1953	Karl Alfred Kihn	CSU	54.0
1957	Karl Alfred Kihn	CSU	57.5
1961	Linus Memmel	CSU	55.7
1965	Linus Memmel	CSU	54.4
1969	Linus Memmel	CSU	52.2
1972	Linus Memmel	CSU	52.8
1976	Wolfgang Bötsch	CSU	57.4
1980	Wolfgang Bötsch	CSU	55.7
1983	Wolfgang Bötsch	CSU	59.1
1987	Wolfgang Bötsch	CSU	55.4
1990	Wolfgang Bötsch	CSU	49.1
1994	Wolfgang Bötsch	CSU	50.8
1998	Wolfgang Bötsch	CSU	46.8
2002	Wolfgang Bötsch	CSU	49.2
2005	Paul Lehrieder	CSU	47.2
2009	Paul Lehrieder	CSU	44.0
2013	Paul Lehrieder	CSU	48.9
2017	Paul Lehrieder	CSU	42.2
2021	Paul Lehrieder	CSU	36.9
2025	Hülya Düber	CSU	39.1

== Election results ==
=== 2025 election ===
Federal election (2025): Würzburg
Notes:	Blue background denotes the winner of the electorate vote. Pink background denotes a candidate elected from their party list. Yellow background denotes an electorate win by a list member, or other incumbent. A ✓ or ✗ denotes status of any incumbent, win or lose respectively.						
Party	Candidate	Votes	%	±%	Party votes	%	±%
CSU	Hülya Düber	74,909	39.1	▲2.3	68,556	35.7	▲5.4
Greens	Jessica Berta Hecht	36,590	19.1	▼0.7	31,416	16.4	▼2.9
SPD	Katharina Räth	26,348	13.8	▼4.3	25,877	13.5	▼6.6
AfD	Federico Karl-Heinz Beck	24,815	13.0		25,961	13.5	▲6.9
Left	Aaron Valent	9,764	5.1	▲1.0	15,639	8.2	▲4.3
FDP	Dr. Andrew John Ullmann	8,009	4.2	▼6.4	8,492	4.4	▼6.0
BSW					5,318	2.8	
FW	Duncan Douglas Eugen Seitz	5,704	3.0	▼2.2	4,455	2.3	▼1.4
Volt	Christoph Schröder	3,178	1.7		1,922	1.0	▲0.6
APT					1,491	0.8	▼0.4
dieBasis	Anna Elisabeth Ulrike Kämmerer	2,083	1.1	▼1.6	851	0.4	▼0.8
PARTEI					717	0.4	▼0.4
Humanists					176	0.1	▼0.1
BD					166	0.1	
BP					161	0.1	▼0.1
MLPD					29	0.0	Steady
[[|]]							
Informal votes		1,014			559		
Total valid votes		191,400			191,855		
Turnout		192,414	86.4	▲3.9			
CSU hold	Majority	38,319	20.0	▲2.9			

=== 2021 election ===
Federal election (2021): Würzburg
Notes:	Blue background denotes the winner of the electorate vote. Pink background denotes a candidate elected from their party list. Yellow background denotes an electorate win by a list member, or other incumbent. A ✓ or ✗ denotes status of any incumbent, win or lose respectively.						
Party	Candidate	Votes	%	±%	Party votes	%	±%
CSU	✓ Paul Lehrieder	67,651	36.9	▼5.3	55,957	30.3	▼6.9
Greens	Sebastian Hansen	36,295	19.8	▲5.8	35,634	19.3	▲6.3
SPD	Freya Altenhöner	33,125	18.1	▼0.7	37,079	20.1	▲2.4
FDP	Andrew Ullmann	19,414	10.6	▲2.5	19,230	10.4	▲0.1
AfD					12,220	6.6	▼2.0
FW	Robert Starosta	9,440	5.1		6,871	3.7	▲2.3
Left	Simone Barrientos	7,522	4.1	▼1.5	7,027	3.8	▼3.3
dieBasis	Robert Hämmelmann	4,898	2.7		2,310	1.3	
Tierschutzpartei					2,091	1.1	▲0.1
PARTEI					1,431	0.8	▼0.4
ÖDP	Stefanie Wierlemann	2,501	1.4	▼0.3	1,098	0.6	▼0.1
Independent	Horst Schürer	1,884	1.0				
Volt					676	0.4	
Pirates					665	0.4	0.0
Team Todenhöfer					433	0.2	
Unabhängige					401	0.2	
Humanists	Thomas Herter	774	0.4		307	0.2	
BP					279	0.2	0.0
Gesundheitsforschung					233	0.1	0.0
V-Partei3					216	0.1	▼0.1
du.					133	0.1	
Bündnis C					125	0.1	
NPD					115	0.1	▼0.2
The III. Path					64	0.0	
LKR					41	0.0	
DKP					39	0.0	0.0
MLPD					27	0.0	0.0
Informal votes		2,155			957		
Total valid votes		183,504			184,702		
Turnout		185,659	82.5	▲1.6			
CSU hold	Majority	31,356	17.1	▼6.3			

=== 2017 election ===
Federal election (2017): Würzburg
Notes:	Blue background denotes the winner of the electorate vote. Pink background denotes a candidate elected from their party list. Yellow background denotes an electorate win by a list member, or other incumbent. A ✓ or ✗ denotes status of any incumbent, win or lose respectively.						
Party	Candidate	Votes	%	±%	Party votes	%	±%
CSU	✓ Paul Lehrieder	76,515	42.2	▼6.7	67,585	37.2	▼7.7
SPD	Eva Linsenbreder	33,929	18.7	▼6.8	32,126	17.7	▼4.9
Greens	Martin Heilig	25,359	14.0	▲4.0	23,719	13.0	▲1.4
FDP	Andrew Ullmann	14,592	8.0	▲4.8	18,813	10.3	▲5.2
AfD	Thomas Thiel	13,872	7.7	▲4.7	15,764	8.7	▲4.8
Left	Simone Barrientos	10,130	5.6	▲2.3	12,931	7.1	▲3.1
FW					2,633	1.4	▼0.3
PARTEI	Andrea Kübert	3,828	2.1		2,049	1.1	
ÖDP	Raimund Binder	3,072	1.7	▲0.5	1,233	0.7	▼0.2
Pirates					646	0.4	▼2.1
DM					464	0.3	
V-Partei³					409	0.2	
NPD					391	0.2	▼0.4
DiB					351	0.2	
BP					323	0.2	▼0.1
BGE					314	0.2	
Gesundheitsforschung					217	0.1	
MLPD					60	0.0	0.0
DKP					27	0.0	
BüSo					16	0.0	0.0
Informal votes		1,664			1,054		
Total valid votes		181,297			181,907		
Turnout		182,961	71.0	▲7.4			
CSU hold	Majority	42,586	23.5	▲0.1			

=== 2013 election ===
Federal election (2013): Würzburg
Notes:	Blue background denotes the winner of the electorate vote. Pink background denotes a candidate elected from their party list. Yellow background denotes an electorate win by a list member, or other incumbent. A ✓ or ✗ denotes status of any incumbent, win or lose respectively.						
Party	Candidate	Votes	%	±%	Party votes	%	±%
CSU	✓ Paul Lehrieder	80,776	48.9	▲4.9	74,187	44.9	▲6.1
SPD	Homaira Mansury	42,136	25.5	▲2.2	37,225	22.5	▲3.9
Greens	Martin Heilig	16,454	10.0	▼3.1	19,311	11.7	▼2.8
Left	Doris Dörnhöfer	5,374	3.3	▼2.3	6,637	4.0	▼2.3
FDP	Joachim Spatz	5,323	3.2	▼6.9	8,485	5.1	▼8.6
AfD	Torsten Heinrich	4,831	2.9		6,388	3.9	
Pirates	Michael Hartrich	4,134	2.5	▲0.3	4,014	2.4	▼0.1
FW	Helmut Suntheim	2,859	1.7		2,920	1.8	
ÖDP	Raimund Binder	1,903	1.2		1,388	0.8	0.0
REP					1,279	0.8	▼0.7
Tierschutzpartei					1,136	0.7	0.0
NPD	Ralf Mynter	1,439	0.9	▼0.5	946	0.6	▼0.2
BP					495	0.3	0.0
DIE FRAUEN					319	0.2	
Party of Reason					182	0.1	
DIE VIOLETTEN					167	0.1	▼0.1
PRO					94	0.1	
RRP					49	0.0	▼0.5
MLPD					29	0.0	0.0
BüSo					20	0.0	0.0
Informal votes		1,364			1,322		
Total valid votes		165,229			165,271		
Turnout		166,593	73.5	▼1.8			
CSU hold	Majority	38,640	23.4	▲2.7			

=== 2009 election ===
Federal election (2009): Würzburg
Notes:	Blue background denotes the winner of the electorate vote. Pink background denotes a candidate elected from their party list. Yellow background denotes an electorate win by a list member, or other incumbent. A ✓ or ✗ denotes status of any incumbent, win or lose respectively.						
Party	Candidate	Votes	%	±%	Party votes	%	±%
CSU	✓ Paul Lehrieder	73,800	44.0	▼3.2	65,294	38.8	▼4.0
SPD	Marion Reuther	39,055	23.3	▼9.0	31,440	18.7	▼9.3
Greens	Patrick Friedl	21,914	13.1	▲4.4	24,341	14.4	▲3.3
FDP	Joachim Spatz	17,030	10.1	▲5.2	23,203	13.8	▲4.2
Left	Holger Grünwedel	9,334	5.6	▲2.3	10,582	6.3	▲2.4
Pirates	Markus Heurung	3,659	2.2		4,262	2.5	
REP					2,462	1.5	▼0.9
ÖDP					1,422	0.8	
NPD	Ralf Mynter	2,312	1.4	▲0.8	1,287	0.8	▲0.2
Tierschutzpartei					1,103	0.7	
FAMILIE					1,011	0.6	0.0
RRP					836	0.5	
Independent	Michael Holl	742	0.4				
BP					428	0.3	▲0.1
DIE VIOLETTEN					260	0.2	
PBC					250	0.1	▼0.1
CM					147	0.1	
BüSo					59	0.0	0.0
DVU					39	0.0	
MLPD					36	0.0	0.0
Informal votes		2,185			1,569		
Total valid votes		167,846			168,462		
Turnout		170,031	75.3	▼5.0			
CSU hold	Majority	34,745	20.7	▲5.8			

=== 2005 election ===
Federal election (2005):Würzburg
Notes:	Blue background denotes the winner of the electorate vote. Pink background denotes a candidate elected from their party list. Yellow background denotes an electorate win by a list member, or other incumbent. A ✓ or ✗ denotes status of any incumbent, win or lose respectively.						
Party	Candidate	Votes	%	±%	Party votes	%	±%
CSU	Paul Lehrieder	82,915	47.2	▼2.0	49,232	27.9	▼2.0
SPD	Walter Kolbow	56,719	32.3	▼0.6	49,232	27.9	▼2.0
Greens	Patrick Friedl	15,157	8.6	▲0.3	19,701	11.2	▲0.3
FDP	Moritz Kracht	8,636	4.9	▼0.2	16,938	9.6	▲4.2
Left	Belinda Brechbilder	5,736	3.3	▲2.5	6,821	3.9	▲3.2
REP	Berthold Seifert	4,444	2.4	▲0.2	4,176	2.4	▲0.8
PBC	Adelheid Huth	1,241	0.7	▲0.3	519	0.3	▲0.1
NPD	Uwe Meenen	935	0.5		928	0.5	▲0.4
Familie					982	0.6	
GRAUEN					614	0.3	▲0.3
Feminist					427	0.2	▲0.1
BP					348	0.2	▲0.1
BüSo					96	0.1	0.0
MLPD					70	0.0	
Informal votes		2,626			2,138		
Total valid votes		175,783			176,271		
Turnout		178,409	80.3	▼2.7			
CSU hold	Majority	26,196	14.9				
