= Main-Taunus =

Federal electoral district of Germany

180 Main-Taunus
- Electoral district for the Bundestag
- Main-Taunus in 2025
- State: Hesse
- Population: 284,200 (2019)
- Electorate: 195,514 (2021)
- Major settlements: Hofheim; Kelkheim; Hattersheim am Main
- Area: 270.6 km^{2}

Current electoral district
- Created: 2002
- Party: CDU
- Member: Norbert Altenkamp
- Elected: 2017, 2021, 2025

Main-Taunus is an electoral constituency (German: Wahlkreis) represented in the Bundestag. It elects one member via first-past-the-post voting. Under the current constituency numbering system, it is designated as constituency 180. It is located in southern Hesse, comprising the Main-Taunus-Kreis district and small parts of the Hochtaunuskreis district.

Main-Taunus was created for the 2002 federal election. Since 2017, it has been represented by Norbert Altenkamp of the Christian Democratic Union (CDU).

== Geography ==
Main-Taunus is located in southern Hesse. As of the 2021 federal election, it comprises the entirety of the Main-Taunus-Kreis district as well as the municipalities of Königstein im Taunus, Kronberg im Taunus, and Steinbach (Taunus) from the Hochtaunuskreis district.

== History ==
Main-Taunus was created in 2002. In the 2002 and 2005 elections, it was constituency 182 in the numbering system. In the 2009 through 2021 elections, it was number 181. From the 2025 election, it has been number 180. Its borders have not changed since its creation.

== Members ==
The constituency was first represented by Heinz Riesenhuber of the Christian Democratic Union (CDU) from 2002 to 2005 to 2017. Norbert Altenkamp of the CDU was elected in 2017.

Election	Member	Party	%
2002	Heinz Riesenhuber	CDU	49.8
2005	Heinz Riesenhuber	CDU	51.1
2009	Heinz Riesenhuber	CDU	47.5
2013	Heinz Riesenhuber	CDU	52.2
2017	Norbert Altenkamp	CDU	41.9
2021	Norbert Altenkamp	CDU	33.3
2025	Norbert Altenkamp	CDU	39.8

== Election results ==
=== 2025 election ===
Federal election (2025): Main-Taunus
Notes:	Blue background denotes the winner of the electorate vote. Pink background denotes a candidate elected from their party list. Yellow background denotes an electorate win by a list member, or other incumbent. A ✓ or ✗ denotes status of any incumbent, win or lose respectively.						
Party	Candidate	Votes	%	±%	Party votes	%	±%
CDU	✓ Norbert Altenkamp	65,485	39.8	▲6.5	57,903	35.1	▲8.1
SPD	Nancy Faeser	29,237	17.8	▼5.0	25,838	15.7	▼6.4
Greens	Anna Lührmann	23,001	14.0	▼2.9	23,886	14.5	▼2.6
AfD	Christian Douglas	21,541	13.1	▲6.3	21,890	13.3	▲6.6
Left	Thomas Völker	9,861	6.0	▲3.3	10,899	6.6	▲3.6
FDP	Bettina Stark-Watzinger	8,846	5.4	▼7.6	12,190	7.4	▼9.5
BSW					6,033	3.7	New
FW	Frank Bergmann	2,962	1.8	▼0.9	1,661	1.0	▼0.6
Tierschutzpartei					1,655	1.0	▼0.3
Volt	Fiona Byrne	2,691	1.6	New	1,598	1.0	▲0.3
PARTEI					698	0.4	▼0.4
BD	Andreas Steba	929	0.6	New	418	0.3	New
Humanists					132	0.1	0.0
MLPD					52	<0.1	0.0
Informal votes		1,344			1,044		
Total valid votes		164,553			164,853		
Turnout		165,897	85.8	▲5.1			
CDU hold	Majority	36,248	22.0	▲11.5			

=== 2021 election ===
Federal election (2021): Main-Taunus
Notes:	Blue background denotes the winner of the electorate vote. Pink background denotes a candidate elected from their party list. Yellow background denotes an electorate win by a list member, or other incumbent. A ✓ or ✗ denotes status of any incumbent, win or lose respectively.						
Party	Candidate	Votes	%	±%	Party votes	%	±%
CDU	✓ Norbert Altenkamp	51,985	33.3	▼8.6	42,260	27.0	▼7.5
SPD	Ilja-Kristin Seewald	35,493	22.8	▲1.0	34,468	22.1	▲3.9
Greens	Kordula Schulz-Asche	26,373	16.9	▲7.8	26,771	17.1	▲6.6
FDP	Bettina Stark-Watzinger	20,295	13.0	▲2.1	26,335	16.9	▲0.1
AfD	Gerhard Bergmann	10,588	6.8	▼2.9	10,427	6.7	▼3.6
Left	Paul Laslop	4,272	2.7	▼2.2	4,708	3.0	▼3.0
FW	Frank Bergmann	4,179	2.7	▲1.0	2,471	1.6	▲0.8
Tierschutzpartei					2,042	1.3	▲0.4
dieBasis					1,871	1.2	
PARTEI	Florian Sauer	2,751	1.8		1,253	0.8	▲0.1
Team Todenhöfer					1,143	0.7	
Volt					1,012	0.6	
Pirates					510	0.3	0.0
Gesundheitsforschung					209	0.1	
ÖDP					163	0.1	▼0.1
Humanists					154	0.1	
V-Partei3					135	0.1	▼0.1
NPD					116	0.1	▼0.1
Bündnis C					93	0.1	
Bündnis 21					56	0.0	
LKR					34	0.0	
MLPD					31	0.0	0.0
DKP					19	0.0	0.0
Informal votes		1,782			1,437		
Total valid votes		155,936			156,281		
Turnout		157,718	80.7	▼0.8			
CDU hold	Majority	16,492	10.5	▼9.6			

=== 2017 election ===
Federal election (2017): Main-Taunus
Notes:	Blue background denotes the winner of the electorate vote. Pink background denotes a candidate elected from their party list. Yellow background denotes an electorate win by a list member, or other incumbent. A ✓ or ✗ denotes status of any incumbent, win or lose respectively.						
Party	Candidate	Votes	%	±%	Party votes	%	±%
CDU	Norbert Altenkamp	66,490	41.9	▼10.6	54,902	34.6	▼9.3
SPD	Ilja-Kristin Seewald	34,527	21.8	▼5.3	28,786	18.1	▼4.4
FDP	Bettina Stark-Watzinger	17,224	10.9	▲6.6	26,571	16.7	▲8.1
AfD	Gernot Laude	15,319	9.7		16,395	10.3	▲3.4
Greens	Kordula Schulz-Asche	14,458	9.1	▲0.9	16,752	10.5	▲0.6
Left	Ingo von Seemen	7,887	5.0	▲0.8	9,504	6.0	▲1.8
Tierschutzpartei					1,500	0.9	
FW	Josef Voege	2,620	1.7		1,293	0.8	0.0
PARTEI					1,173	0.7	▲0.4
Pirates					561	0.4	▼1.5
ÖDP					340	0.2	
NPD					337	0.2	▼0.4
V-Partei³					224	0.1	
DM					222	0.1	
BGE					216	0.1	
MLPD					33	0.0	0.0
BüSo					26	0.0	0.0
DKP					24	0.0	
Informal votes		2,122			1,788		
Total valid votes		158,525			158,859		
Turnout		160,647	81.4	▲2.5			
CDU hold	Majority	21,963	20.1	▼5.3			

=== 2013 election ===
Federal election (2013): Main-Taunus
Notes:	Blue background denotes the winner of the electorate vote. Pink background denotes a candidate elected from their party list. Yellow background denotes an electorate win by a list member, or other incumbent. A ✓ or ✗ denotes status of any incumbent, win or lose respectively.						
Party	Candidate	Votes	%	±%	Party votes	%	±%
CDU	✓ Heinz Riesenhuber	79,353	52.5	▲5.0	66,598	43.8	▲6.7
SPD	Dieter Falk	40,927	27.1	▲3.1	34,156	22.5	▲3.2
Greens	Kordula Schulz-Asche	12,453	8.2	▼2.0	15,057	9.9	▼2.0
FDP	Bettina Stark-Watzinger	6,472	4.3	▼7.9	13,100	8.6	▼13.0
AfD					10,470	6.9	
Left	Fritz-Walter Hornung	6,355	4.2	▼0.8	6,406	4.2	▼1.5
Pirates	Frank Hubertus Schäfer	3,729	2.5		2,773	1.8	▼0.2
FW					1,212	0.8	
NPD	Nikolaus Bexha	1,778	1.2	▲0.1	1,003	0.8	▼0.1
PARTEI					549	0.4	
REP					285	0.2	▼0.3
PRO					159	0.1	
SGP					63	0.0	
BüSo					53	0.0	▼0.1
MLPD					35	0.0	0.0
Informal votes		4,078			3,226		
Total valid votes		151,067			151,919		
Turnout		155,145	78.9	▼0.8			
CDU hold	Majority	38,426	25.4	▲1.9			

=== 2009 election ===
Federal election (2009): Main-Taunus
Notes:	Blue background denotes the winner of the electorate vote. Pink background denotes a candidate elected from their party list. Yellow background denotes an electorate win by a list member, or other incumbent. A ✓ or ✗ denotes status of any incumbent, win or lose respectively.						
Party	Candidate	Votes	%	±%	Party votes	%	±%
CDU	✓ Heinz Riesenhuber	72,680	47.5	▼3.5	56,989	37.1	▼2.9
SPD	Nicole Ritter	36,629	24.0	▼7.9	29,515	19.2	▼8.1
FDP	Bettina Stark-Watzinger	18,588	12.2	▲6.8	33,225	21.7	▲5.3
Greens	Wolfgang Strengmann-Kuhn	15,618	10.2	▲2.6	18,258	11.9	▲1.9
Left	Fritz-Walter Hornung	7,718	5.0	▲2.0	8,699	5.7	▲2.1
Pirates					3,157	2.1	
Tierschutzpartei					1,437	0.9	▲0.3
NPD	Thomas Gorr	1,694	1.1	▼0.1	1,140	0.7	0.0
REP					701	0.5	▼0.1
BüSo					165	0.1	0.0
DVU					110	0.1	
MLPD					30	0.0	0.0
Informal votes		2,821			2,322		
Total valid votes		152,927			153,426		
Turnout		155,748	79.7	▼3.6			
CDU hold	Majority	36,051	23.5	▲4.2			

=== 2005 election ===
Federal election (2005):Main-Taunus
Notes:	Blue background denotes the winner of the electorate vote. Pink background denotes a candidate elected from their party list. Yellow background denotes an electorate win by a list member, or other incumbent. A ✓ or ✗ denotes status of any incumbent, win or lose respectively.						
Party	Candidate	Votes	%	±%	Party votes	%	±%
CDU	✓ Heinz Riesenhuber	80,848	51.1	▲1.3	63,644	40.1	▼2.9
SPD	Gerrit Richter	50,418	31.8	▼3.8	43,337	27.3	▼4.0
Greens	Anna Lührmann	11,988	7.6	▲0.5	15,828	10.0	▼1.6
FDP	Fritz-Wilhelm Krüger	8,411	5.3	▼1.1	26,019	16.4	▲5.6
Left	Beate Ullrich-Graf	4,806	3.0	▲2.0	5,736	3.6	▲2.6
NPD	Günter Seiffert	1,894	1.2		1,198	0.8	▲0.5
Tierschutzpartei					1,061	0.7	▲0.2
REP					958	0.7	▲0.2
GRAUEN					710	0.4	▲0.3
BüSo					114	0.1	0.0
SGP					111	0.1	
MLPD					35	0.0	
Informal votes		2,967			2,581		
Total valid votes		158,365			158,751		
Turnout		161,332	83.3	▼1.1			
CDU hold	Majority	30,430	19.3				
