= Gyde Jensen =

German politician (born 1989)

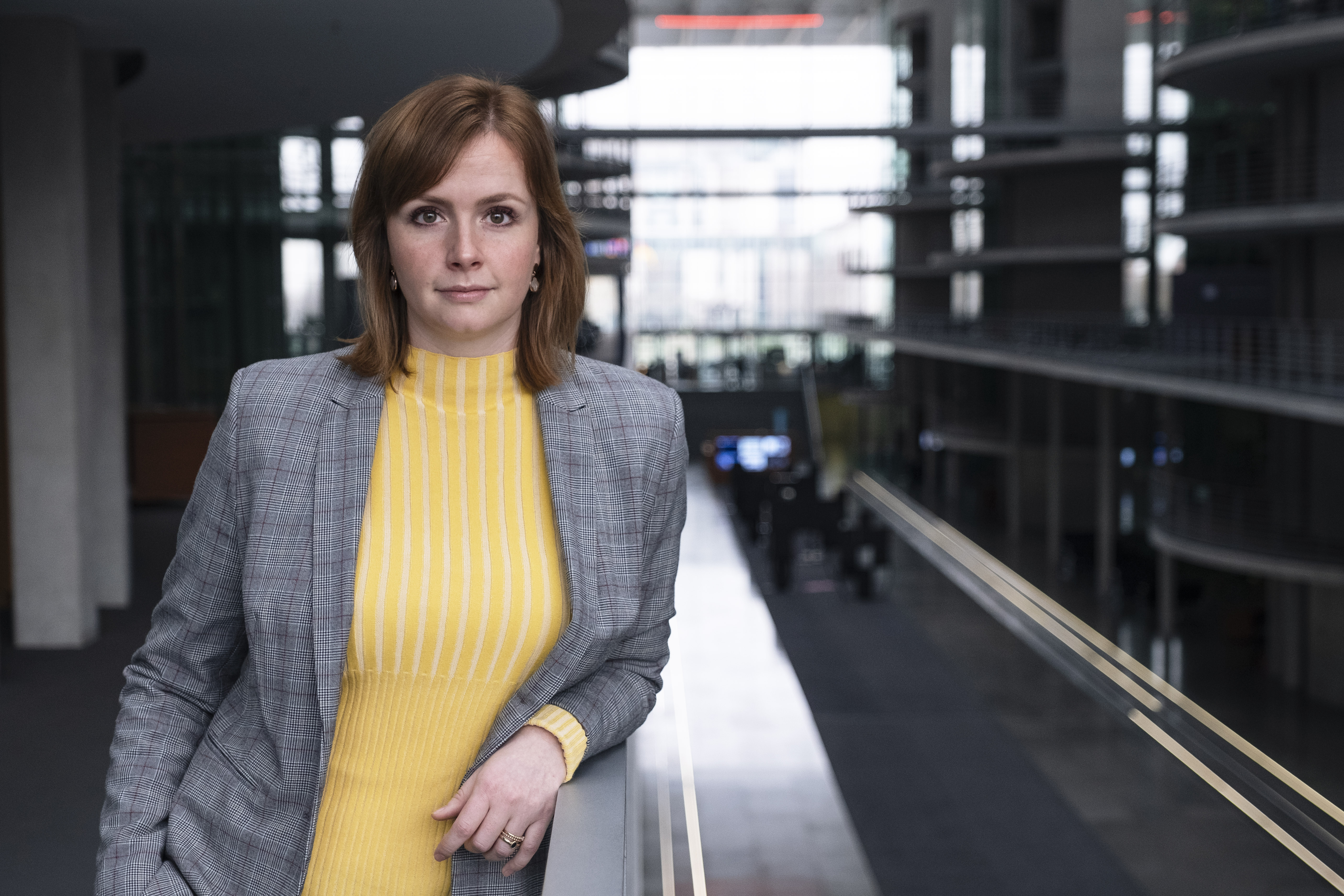

Member of the Bundestag for Schleswig-Holstein
- In office 2017–2025
- Constituency: Free Democratic Party List

Personal details
- Born: 14 August 1989 (age 37) Rendsburg, West Germany
- Citizenship: German
- Party: German: Free Democratic Party; EU: Alliance of Liberals and Democrats for Europe
- Spouse: Dennys Bornhöft
- Children: 1

Gyde Jensen (born 14 August 1989) is a German politician of the Free Democratic Party (FDP) who served as a member of the Bundestag from 2017 to 2025.

== Education and early career ==
Jensen studied English, Political Science, and International Politics at the University of Kiel. After her studies, she worked in Geneva and Washington, D.C. as a communications consultant for the Friedrich Naumann Foundation, which is related to the FDP.

== Member of the Bundestag, 2017–2025 ==
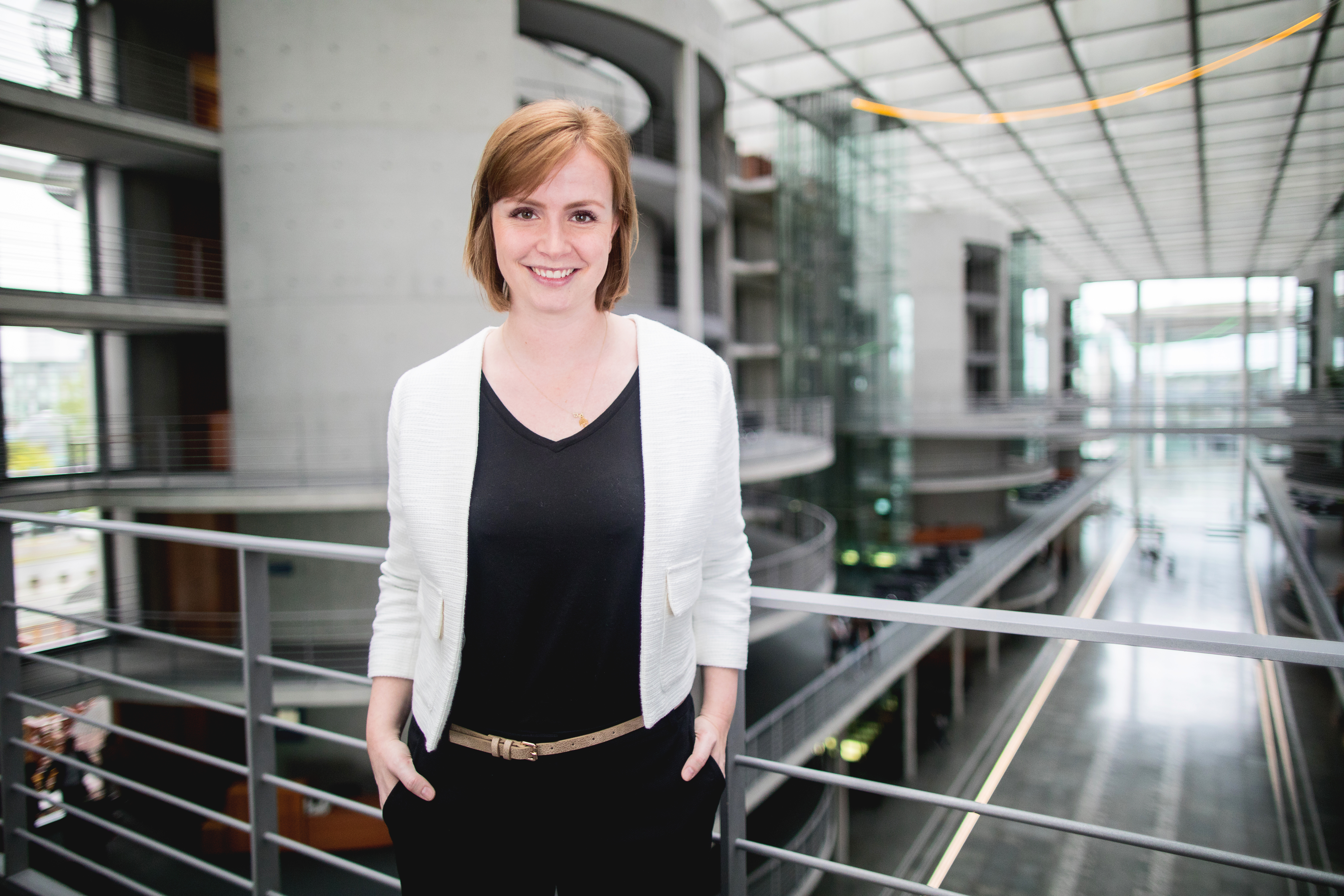
Gyde Jensen, 2018

In May 2016, the state representative assembly of the Schleswig-Holstein FDP elected Jensen to fourth place in the list for the 2017 federal elections. Jensen won the election against former member of the Bundestag, Sebastian Blumenthal. In the election, the FDP won three seats in the state of Schleswig-Holstein with 12.6 percent of the second votes. When Bernd Klaus Buchholz, second on the list, resigned his candidacy to become Schleswig-Holstein's State Minister for Economic Affairs, Jensen took his place.

At the time of her election in 2017, Jensen was the youngest female member of parliament. From 2018 until 2021, she served as chairwoman of Committee on Human Rights and Humanitarian Aid, making her the youngest chair of a committee in the history of the Bundestag.

In addition to her role in parliament, Jensen served as member of the German delegation to the Parliamentary Assembly of the Council of Europe since 2018. As member of the FDP, she was part of the Alliance of Liberals and Democrats for Europe group. She served on the Committee on Equality and Non-Discrimination, the Committee on Legal Affairs and Human Rights, and the Sub-Committee on Human Right.

In the negotiations to form a so-called traffic light coalition of the Social Democratic Party (SPD), the Green Party and the FDP following the 2021 federal elections, Jensen was part of her party's delegation in the working group on foreign policy, defence, development cooperation and human rights, co-chaired by Heiko Maas, Omid Nouripour and Alexander Graf Lambsdorff.

From 2021 to 2025, Jensen served as one of six deputy chairpersons of the FDP parliamentary group under the leadership of its chairman Christian Dürr, where she oversees the group's activities on education policy.

In addition to her committee assignments, Jensen was part of the German-Chinese Parliamentary Friendship Group. She was also part of the Inter-Parliamentary Alliance on China.

== Other activities ==
- Leibniz Association, Member of the Senate (since 2022)
- Aktion Deutschland Hilft (Germany's Relief Coalition), Member of the Board of Trustees (since 2019)
- European Youth Parliament – Germany, Member of the Board of Trustees

== Political positions ==
Amid the COVID-19 pandemic in Germany, Jensen joined forces with five other parliamentarians – Konstantin Kuhle, Andrew Ullmann, Dieter Janecek, Paula Piechotta and Kordula Schulz-Asche – on a cross-party initiative to support legislation that would require all those who have not had yet been vaccinated to receive counselling before later requiring all adults above 50 years to be vaccinated.

== Personal life ==
Jensen is married to FDP member of state parliament Dennys Bornhöft. In September 2019, she gave birth to a daughter.
