= Hülya Düber =

German politician (born 1978)

Hülya Düber MdB
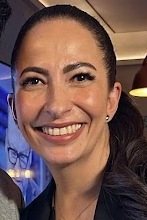
- Düber in 2025

Member of the Bundestag; for Würzburg
- Incumbent
- Assumed office 25 March 2025
- Preceded by: Paul Lehrieder

Personal details
- Born: Hülya Bandak; 5 July 1978 (age 48) Miltenberg, West Germany
- Party: Christian Social Union
- Education: University of Würzburg; Ankara University

Hülya Düber (born 5 July 1978) is a German politician who was elected to the Bundestag in 2025. She has served as district councillor of Lower Franconia since 2018.
