= Dennys Bornhöft =

German politician (born 1986)

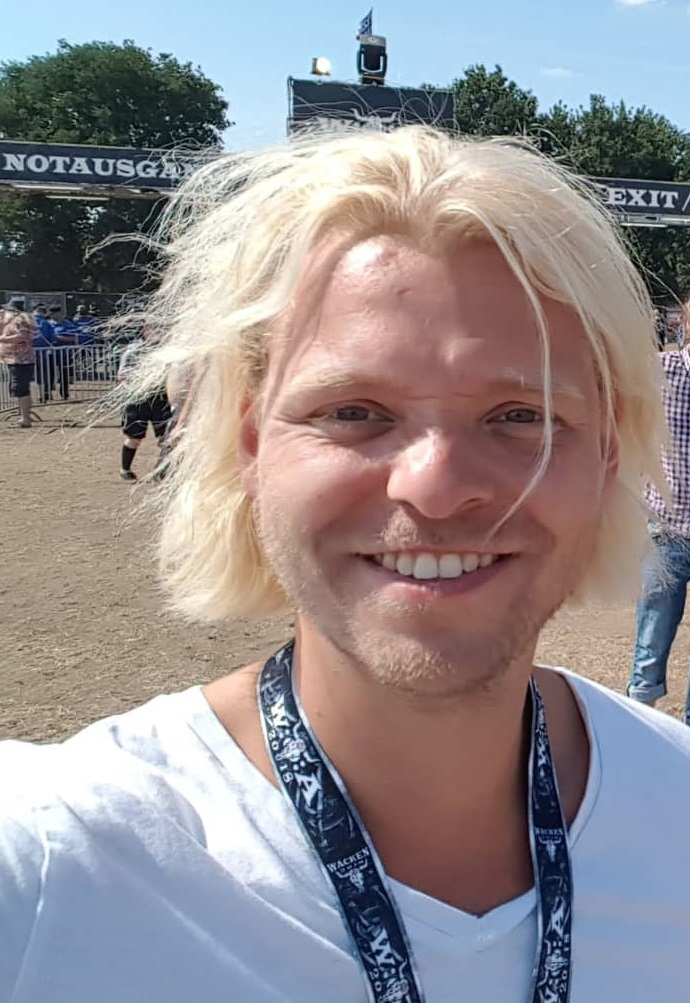
- Bornhöft in 2021

Member of the Landtag of Schleswig-Holstein
- In office 6 June 2017 – 7 June 2022

Personal details
- Born: 2 April 1986 (age 40) Preetz
- Party: Free Democratic Party
- Spouse: Gyde Jensen

Dennys André Bornhöft (born 2 April 1986 in Preetz) is a German politician serving as administrative director of Eidertal since 2025. From 2017 to 2022, he was a member of the Landtag of Schleswig-Holstein. He is married to Gyde Jensen.
