= Paul Lehrieder =

German politician (born 1959)

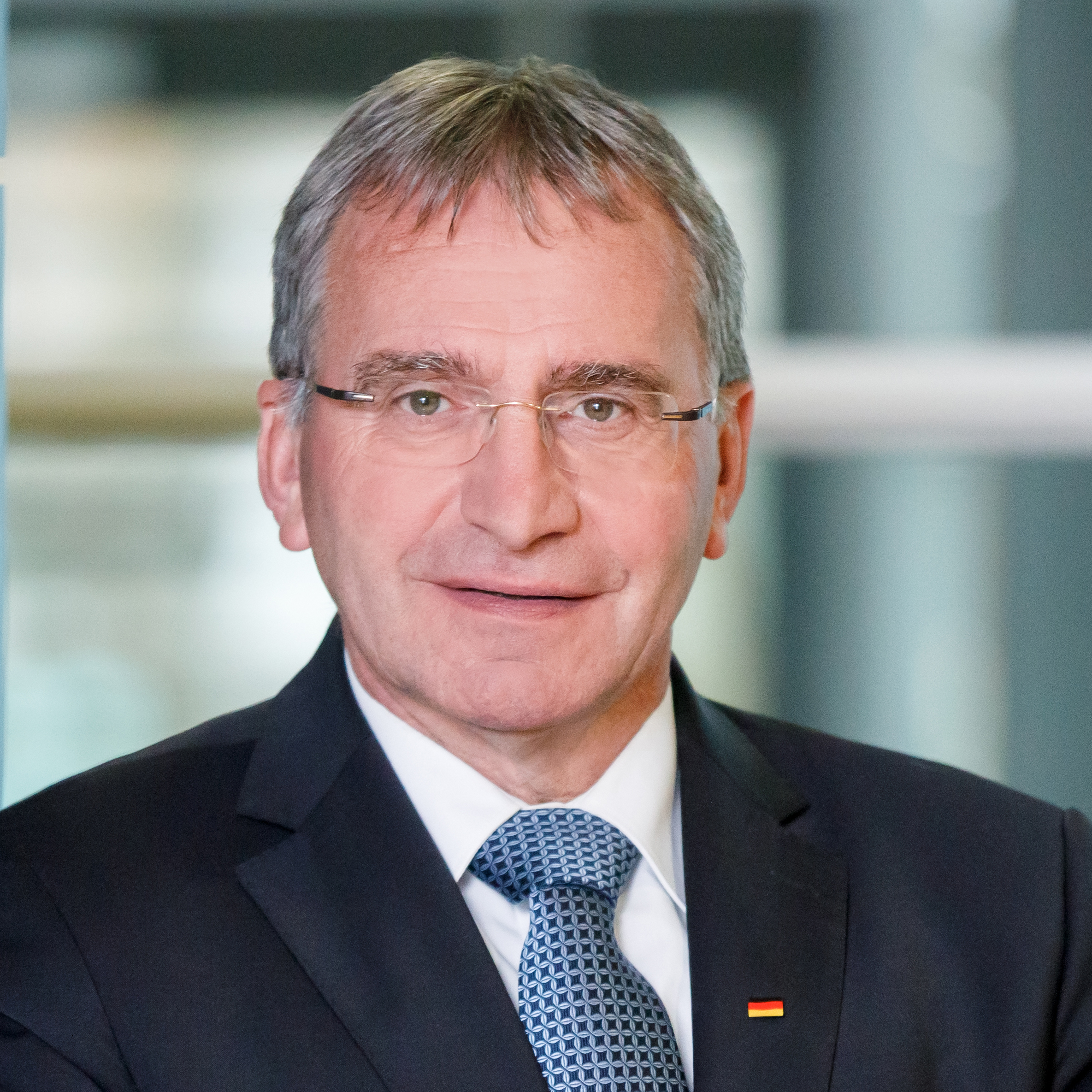
- Lehrieder in 2018

Member of the Bundestag; for Würzburg
- In office 18 October 2005 – 25 March 2025
- Preceded by: Wolfgang Bötsch
- Succeeded by: Hülya Düber

Personal details
- Born: 20 November 1959 (age 66) Ochsenfurt, West Germany
- Party: Christian Social Union
- Children: 2
- Education: University of Würzburg

Paul Lehrieder (born 20 November 1959) is a German lawyer and politician of the Christian Social Union (CSU) who served as a member of the Bundestag from the state of Bavaria from 2005 to 2025, representing Würzburg.

== Political career ==
Lehrieder first became a member of the Bundestag in the 2005 German federal election. He was a member of the Committee on Tourism and the Committee on Legal Affairs and Consumer Protection.

In addition to his committee assignments, Lehrieder was part of the German Parliamentary Friendship Group for Relations with the States of South Asia.

In the negotiations to form a Grand Coalition of the Christian Democrats (CDU together with the Bavarian CSU) and the Social Democrats (SPD) following the 2013 federal elections, Lehrieder was part of the CDU/CSU delegation in the working group on labor policy, led by Ursula von der Leyen and Andrea Nahles. In similar negotiations following the 2017 federal elections, he was part of the working group on families, women, seniors and youth, led by Annette Widmann-Mauz, Angelika Niebler and Katarina Barley.

In early 2024, Lehrieder announced that he would not stand in the 2025 federal elections but instead resign from active politics by the end of the parliamentary term.

== Political positions ==
In June 2017, Lehrieder voted against Germany's introduction of same-sex marriage.
