= Kordula Schulz-Asche =

German politician (born 1956)

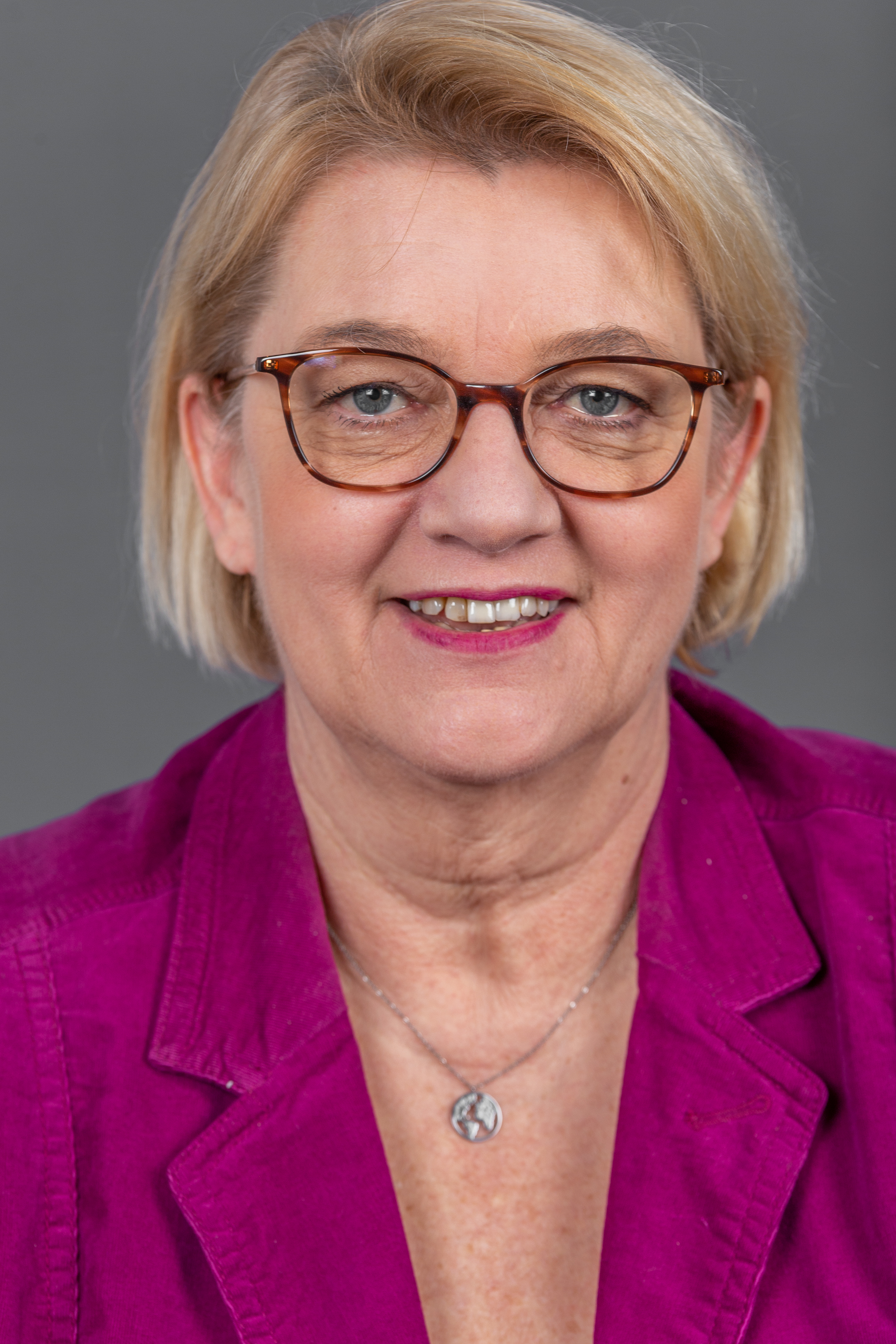
- Schulz-Asche in 2020

Member of the Bundestag
- In office 2017–2025

Personal details
- Born: 31 December 1956 (age 69) Berlin, West Germany (now Germany)
- Party: Greens
- Education: Free University of Berlin

Kordula Schulz-Asche (born 31 December 1956) is a German politician of Alliance 90/The Greens who served as a member of the Bundestag from the state of Hesse from 2013 to 2025.

== Early life and career ==
Schulz-Asche was born in Berlin. After graduating from the Lily-Braun-Oberschule in Spandau and training as a nurse with the German Red Cross (DRK), she studied communication sciences, history and political science at the Free University of Berlin.

From 1986 to 1998 Schulz-Asche lived with her husband, the African economist Helmut Asche, and her daughter in various African countries (Burkina Faso, Rwanda and Kenya). During this time she worked for development organisations in the field of health education. From 2000 to 2003 she worked for the German Agency for Technical Cooperation (GTZ).

== Political career ==
=== Career in state politics ===
From 1983 until 1985, Schulz-Asche was a member of the State Parliament of Berlin.

Schulz-Asche later served as a member of the State Parliament of Hesse from 2003 to 2013. In that capacity, she was her parliamentary group's spokesperson for social, demographic, health and disability policy.

Alongside Tarek Al-Wazir, Schulz-Asche led her party’s delegation in the negotiations to form its first-ever coalition government with the Christian Democratic Union (CDU) under the leadership of Volker Bouffier following the 2013 state elections.

=== Member of the German Parliament, 2013–2025 ===
Schulz-Asche first became a member of the Bundestag in the 2013 German federal election.

In parliament, Schulz-Asche was a member of the Health Committee. In 2022, she also joined the Subcommittee on Global Health. For her parliamentary group, she was spokesperson for care policy and for policy on the elderly.

In addition to her committee assignments, Schulz-Asche was part of the Parliamentary Friendship Group for the States of East Africa, which is in charge of maintaining inter-parliamentary relations with Ethiopia, Burundi, Djibouti, Eritrea, Kenya, Rwanda, Somalia, Sudan and Uganda.

In the negotiations to form a so-called traffic light coalition of the Social Democratic Party (SPD), the Green Party and the Free Democratic Party (FDP) following the 2021 German elections, Schulz-Asche was part of her party's delegation in the working group on health, co-chaired by Katja Pähle, Maria Klein-Schmeink and Christine Aschenberg-Dugnus.

In early 2024, Schulz-Asche announced that she would not stand in the 2025 federal elections but instead resign from active politics by the end of the parliamentary term.

== Other activities ==
- German Africa Foundation, Member of the Board (since 2022)
- German Network against Neglected Tropical Diseases (DNTDs), Member of the Parliamentary Advisory Board (since 2018)
- German Health Partnership (GHP), Member of the advisory board (since 2017)
- German Foundation for World Population (DSW), Member of the Parliamentary Advisory Board
- Deutscher Bürgerpreis, Member of the Jury
- German United Services Trade Union (ver.di), Member

== Political positions ==
Amid the COVID-19 pandemic in Germany, Schulz-Asche joined forces with five other parliamentarians – Gyde Jensen, Konstantin Kuhle, Andrew Ullmann, Dieter Janecek and Paula Piechotta – on a cross-party initiative to support legislation that would have required all those who have not had yet been vaccinated to receive counselling before later requiring all adults above 50 years to be vaccinated.
