= Wolfgang Bötsch =

German politician

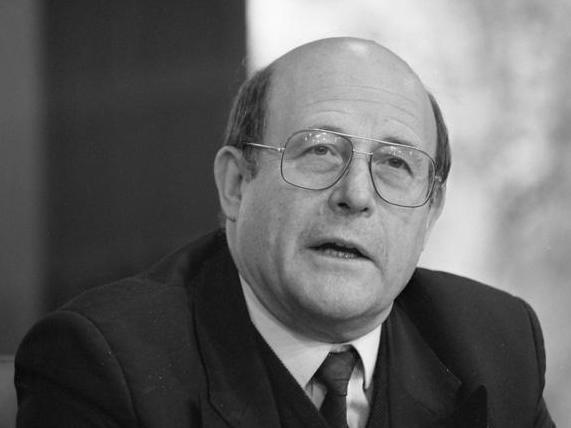
- Bötsch in 1990

Minister of Post and Telecommunications
- In office 25 January 1993 – 31 December 1997
- Chancellor: Helmut Kohl
- Preceded by: Christian Schwarz-Schilling
- Succeeded by: Office abolished

Member of the Bundestag; for Würzburg
- In office 14 December 1976 – 18 October 2005
- Preceded by: Linus Memmel
- Succeeded by: Paul Lehrieder

Member of the Landtag of Bavaria; for Würzburg-Stadt
- In office 12 November 1974 – 26 October 1976
- Preceded by: Ludwig Altenhöfer
- Succeeded by: Barbara Stamm

Personal details
- Born: 8 September 1938 Bad Kreuznach, Germany
- Died: 14 October 2017 (aged 79) Würzburg, Germany
- Party: Christian Social Union
- Children: 2
- Education: University of Würzburg
- Awards: Order of Merit of the Federal Republic of Germany

Wolfgang Bötsch (8 September 1938 – 14 October 2017) was a German politician, representative of the Christian Social Union in Bavaria (CSU). Between 1974 and 1976 he represented the Landtag of Bavaria. From 1976 to 2005 he was a member of the Bundestag, and between 1993 and 1997 he was the last Federal Minister of Post and Telecommunications. Bötsch died on 14 October 2017 at the age of 79.

== See also ==
- List of Bavarian Christian Social Union politicians
