= Andrew Ullmann =

German politician (born 1963)

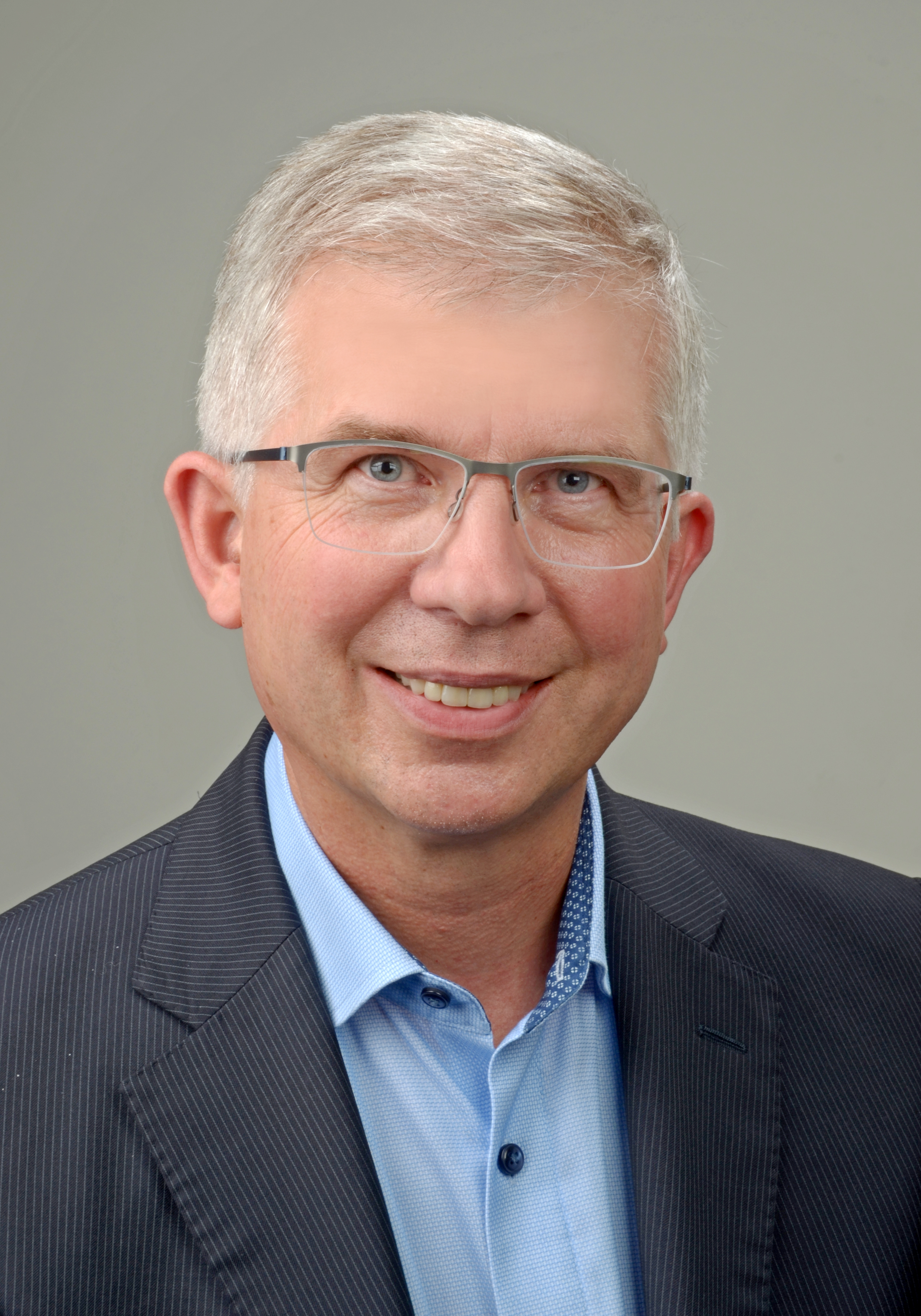
- Ullmann in 2017

Member of the Bundestag
- In office 2017–2025

Personal details
- Born: Andrew John Ullmann; 2 January 1963 (age 63) Los Angeles
- Party: FDP
- Children: 2
- Education: Ruhr University Bochum; Harvard Medical School
- Occupation: University Professor of Infectious Diseases

Andrew John Ullmann (born 2 January 1963) is a German physician and politician of the Free Democratic Party (FDP) who served as a member of the Bundestag from the state of Bavaria from 2017 to 2025.

== Early life and career ==
Born in Los Angeles, Ullmann spent his childhood there until he moved to Germany with his family in 1972. After graduating from high school in 1981 at the Reichenbach-Gymnasium in Ennepetal, Germany, he attended medical school at Ruhr University Bochum and graduated in 1987.

During his time as a resident at the University Hospital at St. Josef Hospital in Bochum, Ullmann took part in clinical training at the Spellman Center for HIV-Related Disease at the 250-bed St Clare's Hospital, the only ward in New York State devoted to the comprehensive treatment of AIDS at the time. At Harvard Medical School he participated in an Infectious Diseases combined-fellowship program for two years. In 2008, he became assistant professor (Privatdozent) at the University Medical Center Mainz, Germany, and was appointed full-professor at the University Hospital of Würzburg, Germany, in 2012.

== Political career ==
Ullmann joined the FDP in 2003. He became member of the Bundestag in the 2017 German federal election. In parliament, he was a member of the Health Committee and the Sub-Committee on Global Health. From 2018 to 2021, he was his parliamentary group's rapporteur on technology assessment. From 2022, he chaired the Subcommittee on Global Health, and in May 2022 he was appointed as his parliamentary group’s spokesperson for health.

In addition to his committee assignments, Ullmann was part of the German-American Parliamentary Friendship Group.

In 2020, Ullmann was also elected as a member of the city council in Würzburg.

In the negotiations to form a so-called traffic light coalition of the Social Democratic Party (SPD), the Green Party and the FDP following the 2021 federal elections, Ullmann was part of his party's delegation in the working group on health, co-chaired by Katja Pähle, Maria Klein-Schmeink and Christine Aschenberg-Dugnus.

== Other activities ==
=== Corporate boards ===
- Würzburger Versorgungs- und Verkehrs-GmbH (WVV), Member of the Supervisory Board

=== Non-profit organizations ===
- "End Polio Now", Chairman of the Parliamentary Advisory Board (since 2022)
- German-Israeli Health Forum for Artificial Intelligence (GIHF-AI), Member of the Board of Trustees (since 2022)
- German Health Partnership (GHP), Member of the advisory board (since 2020)
- UNITE – Parliamentary Network to End HIV/AIDS, Viral Hepatitis and Other Infectious Diseases, Member (since 2018)
- German-Israeli Society (DIG), Member
- German Network against Neglected Tropical Diseases (DNTDs), Member of the Parliamentary Advisory Board (2018–2025)

== Political positions ==
Amid the COVID-19 pandemic in Germany, Ullmann joined forces with five other parliamentarians – Gyde Jensen, Konstantin Kuhle, Dieter Janecek, Paula Piechotta and Kordula Schulz-Asche – on a cross-party initiative to support legislation that would have required all those who have not had yet been vaccinated to receive mandatory counseling to boost vaccination rates, in a second step depending on the immunity levels of the population to activate mandatory vaccination for those older than 50 years of age later that year. The proposal ultimately did not receive the support of the Bundestag.
