= Aaron Valent =

German politician (born 1997)

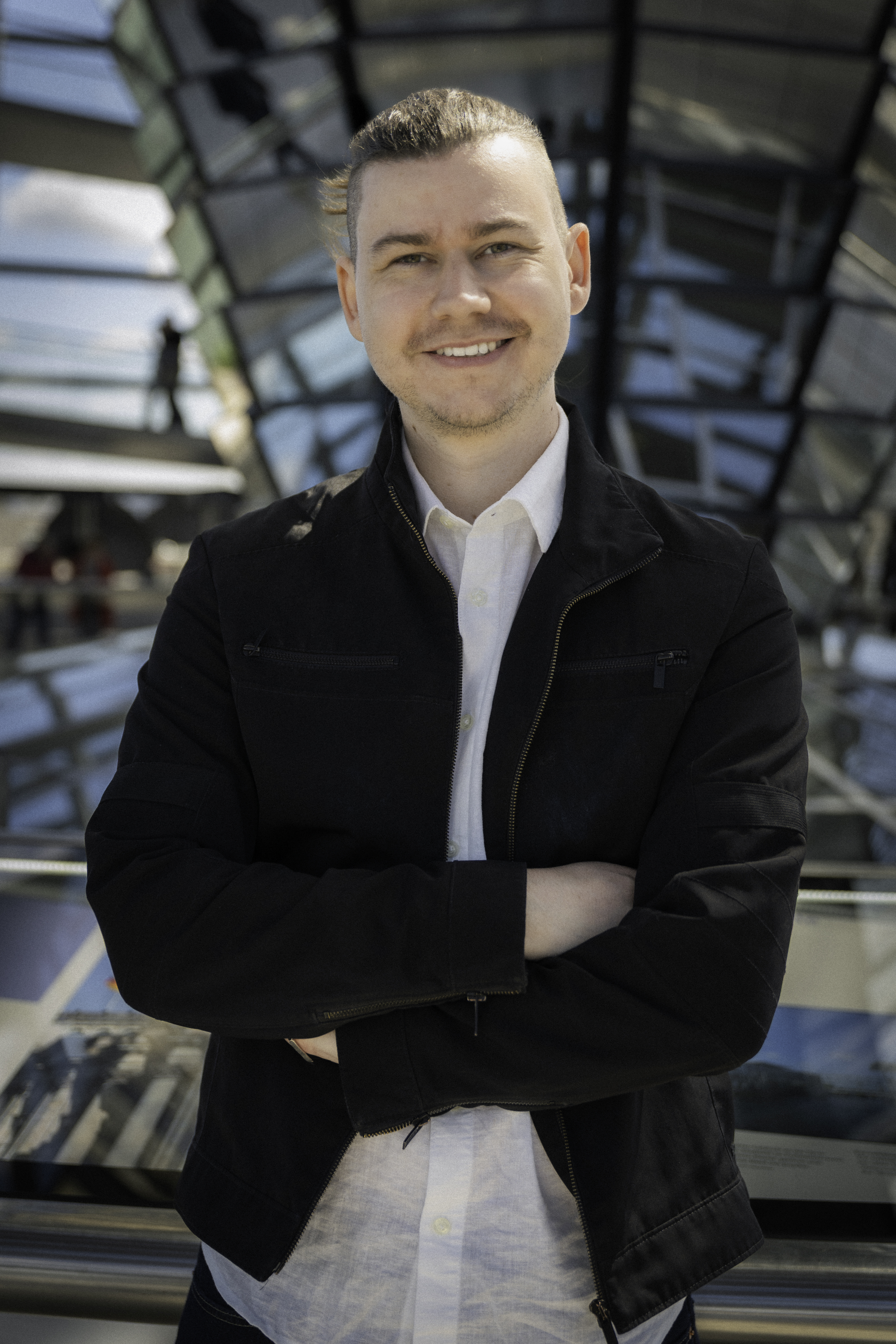
- Valent in 2025

Member of the Bundestag
- Incumbent
- Assumed office 2025
- Constituency: Bavaria

Personal details
- Born: 14 March 1997 (age 29) Starnberg
- Party: Die Linke
- Education: University of Würzburg

Aaron Valent (born 14 March 1997) is a German politician from The Left. In the 2025 German federal election, Valent ran in constituency 250 in Würzburg and entered the 21st German Bundestag in 6th place on his party's Bavarian state list.

== Life ==
In 2023, Aaron Valent ran for the district council election in Lower Franconia and studied in the meantime at the Julius Maximilian University of Würzburg. At the time of his election to the Bundestag, Valent was training as a legal assistant. He is a member of the Bavarian state executive committee of the Left Party.
