= Norbert Altenkamp =

German politician

Norbert Altenkamp MdB
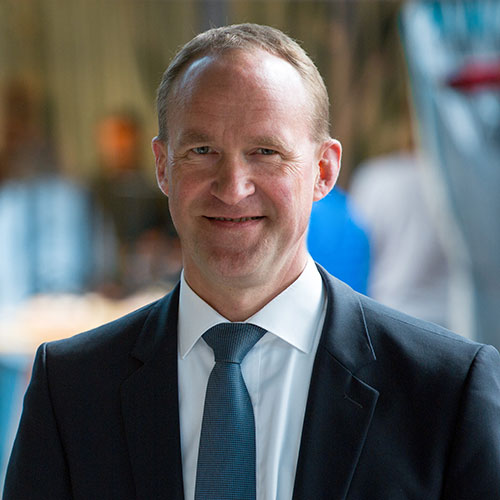
- Altenkamp in 2017

Member of the Bundestag; for Main-Taunus
- Incumbent
- Assumed office 24 October 2017
- Preceded by: Heinz Riesenhuber

Mayor of Bad Soden
- In office 2004–2017
- Preceded by: Kurt E. Bender
- Succeeded by: Frank Blasch

Personal details
- Born: Norbert Maria Altenkamp; 27 July 1972 (age 54) Marl, North Rhine-Westphalia, West Germany
- Party: Christian Democratic Union
- Children: 2
- Education: University of Münster

Norbert Altenkamp (born 27 July 1972) is a German politician of the Christian Democratic Union (CDU) who has been serving as a member of the Bundestag since 2017. He previously served as mayor of Bad Soden.

== Early life and education ==
Altenkamp was born in Marl, North Rhine-Westphalia. After his Abitur, he took up an apprenticeship as a bank teller at Dresdner Bank in Essen, followed by studying economics at the University of Münster.

== Political career ==
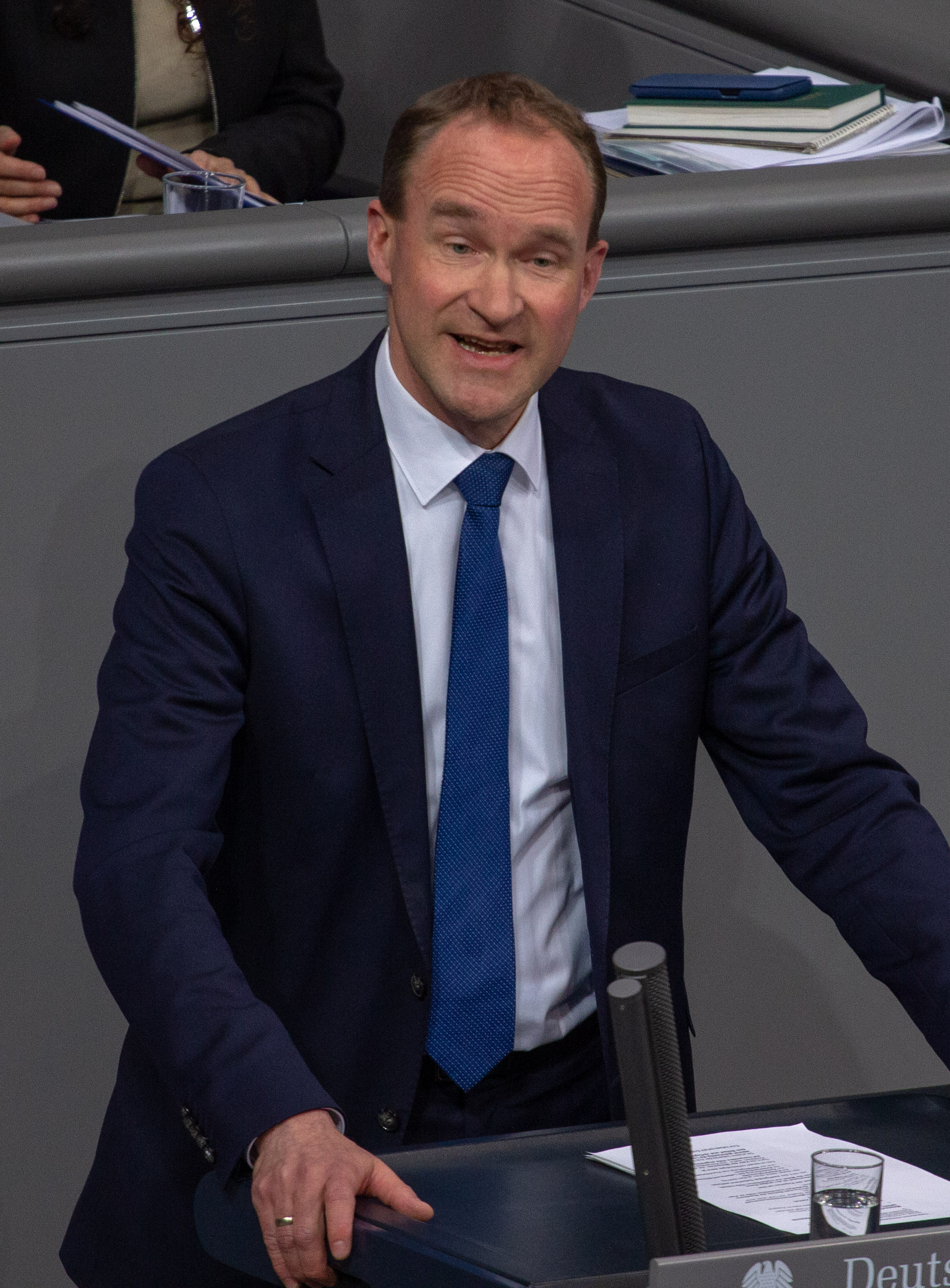
Altenkamp in the plenum of the German Bundestag

Altenkamp entered the CDU in 1990. From 2004 to 2017, he was mayor of Bad Soden. He was first elected in 2003 with 63.3% of the vote and was re-elected in 2009 and 2015.

In the 2017 German federal election, Altenkamp was directly elected as member of parliament for the electoral district of Main-Taunus, becoming the CDU candidate after a contested internal election. He has since been serving on the Committee on Education, Research and Technology Assessment and the Committee on Human Rights and Humanitarian Aid. In this capacity, he is the CDU/CSU parliamentary group's rapporteur on the immigration of skilled workers and on tax incentives for research and development.

In 2023, Altenkamp co-founded the Cross-Party Parliamentary on the Situation of the Uyghurs.

== Other activities ==
- Süwag Energie, Member of the advisory board (since 2015)
- Taunus Sparkasse, Member of the supervisory board (since 2011)
- Kliniken des Main-Taunus-Kreises, Member of the advisory board (since 2016)

== Personal life ==
Altenkamp is married and has two children, and currently resides in Bad Soden.
