= Heinz Riesenhuber =

German politician (born 1935)

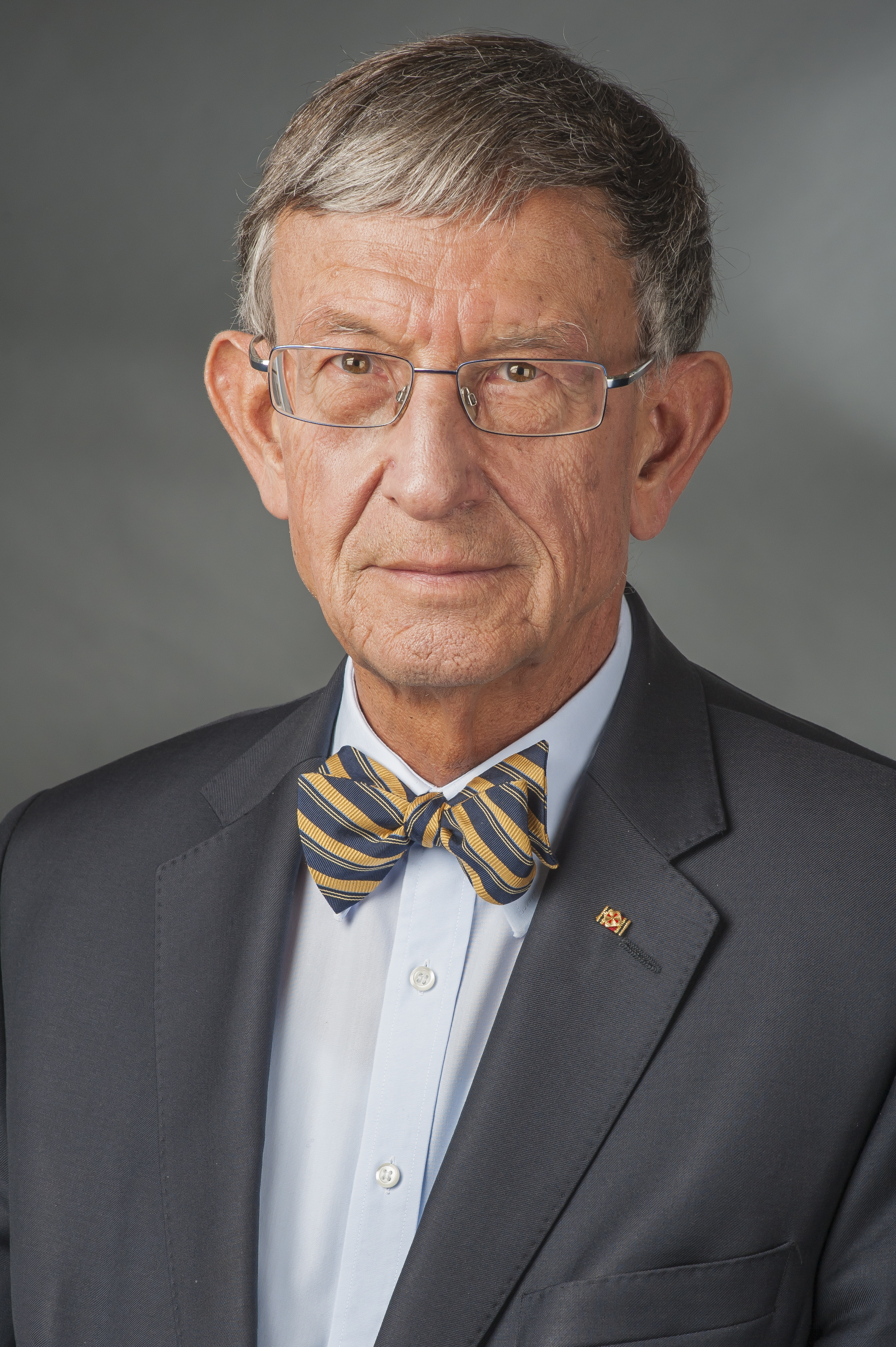
- Riesenhuber in 2014

President by right of age of the Bundestag
- In office 27 October 2009 – 1 June 2017
- Preceded by: Otto Schily
- Succeeded by: Wolfgang Schäuble

Minister of Scientific Research
- In office 4 October 1982 – 21 January 1993
- Chancellor: Helmut Kohl
- Preceded by: Andreas von Bülow
- Succeeded by: Matthias Wissmann

Member of the Bundestag; from Hesse
- In office 14 December 1976 – 24 October 2017
- Preceded by: Multi-member district
- Succeeded by: Norbert Altenkamp
- Constituency: State list (1976–1980); Frankfurt am Main I – Main-Taunus (1980–2002); Main-Taunus (2002–2017)

Personal details
- Born: 1 December 1935 (age 90) Frankfurt, Germany
- Party: Christian Democratic Union (since 1961)
- Children: 2
- Education: Technical University of Munich
- Occupation: Chemist

Heinz Friedrich Ruppert Riesenhuber (born 1 December 1935) is a German politician (CDU) who served as Minister of Scientific Research under Chancellor Helmut Kohl from 1982 to 1993.

== Life and education ==
Riesenhuber received his high school diploma (Abitur) in 1955 in Frankfurt am Main. He studied economics and chemistry until 1961. He had a scholarship of the catholic Cusanuswerk. From 1962 he worked for four years as a researcher in the department of chemistry at the Johann Wolfgang Goethe-Universität and earned a Doctorate degree in chemistry in 1965.

From 1966 to 1982 he worked for Metallgesellschaft AG, Frankfurt am Main. Within the Metallgesellschaft Group, he was CEO for the subsidiary "Erzgesellschaft mbH" (from 1968), and from 1971 to 1982 Chief technical officer of "Synthomer Chemie GmbH", another subsidiary.

He was co-president of the German-Japanese Cooperation Council for High-technology and Environmental Technology DJR in Bonn. Since 1995 he is honorary professor at the University of Frankfurt and president of the German Parliamentary Union (Deutsche Parlamentarischen Gesellschaft) since 2006.

Riesenhuber is a member of several governing boards and advisory committees of German and foreign companies and institutes. He lives in Frankfurt-Unterliederbach, is married and has four children.

== Political career ==
Riesenhuber became a member of the Christian Democratic Union (CDU) in 1961. Between 1965 and 1969 he was head of the youth organization of CDU (Junge Union) in Hessen. He was chairman of CDU Frankfurt from 1973 to 1978. In 1979 he was elected as a chairman of CDU district Untermain (now FrankfurtRheinMain).

From 1976 to 2017, he served as a member of the federal German legislature, the Bundestag. At first he was elected via the Landesliste ("state list"), then from 1980 he represented the electoral district Frankfurt am Main I - Main-Taunus and since 2002 the district Main-Taunus. This period of over 40 years has made him the third-longest member, after Wolfgang Schäuble and Richard Stücklen. In the elections of 2009 he attained 47,5 % of the votes, in 2013 52,5 %.

On 4 October 1982 he was appointed Minister of Scientific Research by chancellor Helmut Kohl. He served as such until 21 January 1993. During this time he supported the Transrapid and the wind turbine Growian.

In 2009 he became the 17th Alterspräsident (Father of the House) of the Bundestag due to his status as the oldest member of the legislature. He continued to hold this post in the following legislature. In 2017 he did not run for parliament again.

== Honors ==
Riesenhuber earned an Honorary degree Dr. h.c. from

- Weizmann Institute of Science in Rehovot (Israel)
- University of Krakau (Poland)
- University of Surrey (England), 1993
- University of Göttingen, 1997

He was given a number of awards, including

- Order of Merit of the Federal Republic of Germany
- Grand Officer of the Legion of Honour (France)
- Decoration of Honour for Services to the Republic of Austria
- Order of the Sacred Treasure (Japan)

== Trivia ==
His personal brand is his bow tie, which he always wears. In his political campaigns for the Bundestag he used a poster showing only a bow tie in the national colours of Germany: Black, red and gold. Neither his name nor his party was mentioned, but everybody in his constituency recognized Riesenhuber.
