= President by right of age of the Bundestag =

Longest-serving member of the German Bundestag

- Alterspräsident des Deutschen Bundestages
- Seal of the Bundestag

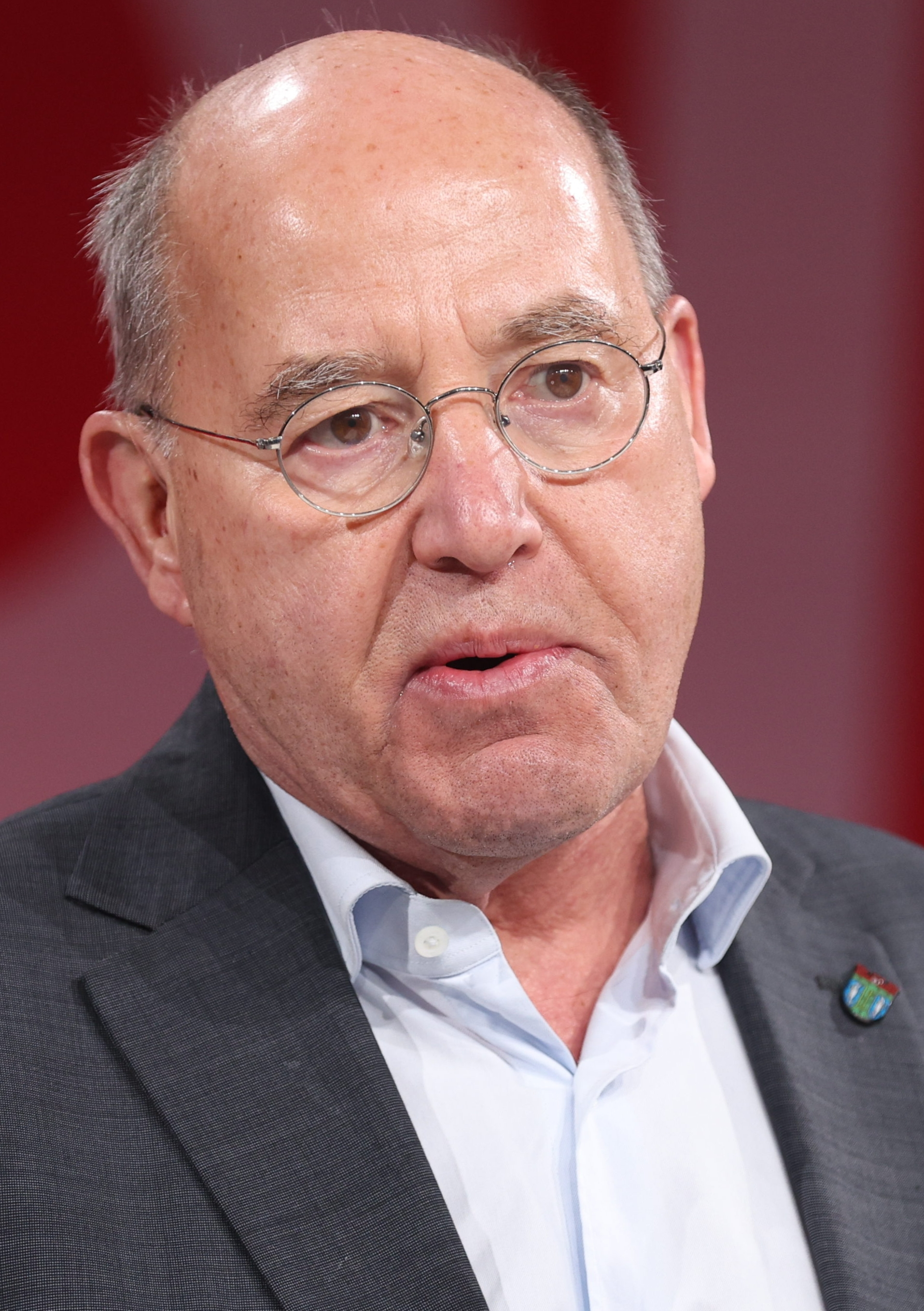
- Incumbent; Gregor Gysi since 25 March 2025
- Presidium of the Bundestag
- Style: Mr. President (when addressed in the Bundestag)
- Type: Presiding officer
- Status: acting
- Seat: Reichstag building, Berlin
- Term length: Contemporaneous to legislative period
- Constituting instrument: Standing rules of the German Bundestag
- Formation: 7 September 1949
- First holder: Paul Löbe
- Deputy: Members of the Bundestag in descending order of seniority
- Website: www.bundestag.de

The president by right of age (Alterspräsident) is the longest-serving member of the German Bundestag (before 2017 the oldest by age).

== Role ==
The role of the President by right of age is defined in the standing rules of the Bundestag: Currently (since 2017), the position is held by the longest-serving member of parliament, with discontinuous terms of office being added together. If two members of parliament have been in office for the same length of time, age is decisive. Before a change to the standing rules in 2017, the position was held by the oldest member.

The president by right of age presides over the Bundestag, whenever the whole Presidium of the Bundestag (president and vice presidents) is vacant or incapacitated. This is usually the case during the opening session of each legislative term, over which the President by right of age presides until a President of the Bundestag has been elected and accepted the election. For this purpose, they are authorized to appoint temporary secretaries, who remain in office until the election of regular secretaries in a later session. It is common practice for the President by right of age to give the first speech of the new legislative period.

Apart from the opening session, the president by right of age also presides over the Bundestag at any time, if both the President and all Vice Presidents are incapable of attending. This has only happened once so far: On 18 April 1958 President of the Bundestag Eugen Gerstenmaier had to give up the chairmanship of the session without one of the Vice Presidents being present at the time. Kurt Pohle, the oldest member present at the time, took over the chairmanship for a short time until Vice President Carlo Schmid arrived and replaced him.

Ahead of the 2017 election, with the right-wing populist party Alternative for Germany likely to enter Bundestag and one of its members likely to become the president by right of age due to being the oldest member. To prevent this, the rules were changed, so that instead of the oldest it would be held by the longest-serving member.

There have been cases in which the longest-serving or oldest MP has declined to hold the position: Konrad Adenauer, for example, who was the oldest member of the Bundestag for many years, set the precedent of a sitting chancellor renouncing the dignity. In this case, according to standing rules, he is replaced by the MP who has served the second longest time (previously: the next oldest).

== List of Presidents by right of age of the Bundestag ==
The office of President by right of age exists on a case-by-case basis. De jure, it is not held permanently by a specific person, but its holder is determined ad hoc. The following overview shows those Members of the Bundestag who, at a given point in the Bundestag's history, were or would have been entitled to claim the dignity in case of need, if present at the time. If another Member had to assume this function in a specific case, this is explained in the notes column.

#	Portrait	Name	Member of the Bundestag (since 2017)	Term of office	Time in office	Faction	Legislative periods	Notes
1		Paul Löbe (1875–1967)		7 September 1949 – 7 September 1953	4 years, 0 days	SPD	1st	
2		Konrad Adenauer (1876–1967)		6 October 1953 – 19 April 1967	13 years, 195 days	CDU/CSU	2nd, 3rd, 4th, 5th	During the 2nd, 3rd and 4th legislative periods, Adenauer refrained from presiding over the opening session due to his position as chancellor. In each case, the function was assumed by the next oldest member of parliament present: In the opening sessions of the 2nd and 3rd Bundestag this was Marie Elisabeth Lüders (FDP, 1878–1966); on 18 April 1958, for some minutes, the entire presidium was unavailable to chair the session and Kurt Pohle (SPD, 1899–1961) took over the chair, being the oldest member present at the time. Robert Pferdmenges (CDU/CSU, 1880–1962) presided over the opening session of the 4th Bundestag.
3		Arthur Enk (1894–1976)		19 April 1967 – 20 October 1969	2 years, 184 days	CDU/CSU	5th	Enk became the oldest member of parliament due to the death of Adenauer in the middle of the current legislative period; he never presided over the Bundestag.
4		William Borm (1895–1987)		20 October 1969 – 13 December 1972	3 years, 54 days	FDP	6th	
5		Ludwig Erhard (1897–1977)		13 December 1972 – 5 May 1977	4 years, 143 days	CDU/CSU	7th, 8th	
6		Johann Baptist Gradl (1904–1988)		5 May 1977 – 4 November 1980	3 years, 183 days	CDU/CSU	8th	Gradl became the oldest member of parliament due to the death of Erhard in the middle of the current legislative period; he never presided over the Bundestag.
7		Herbert Wehner (1906–1990)		4 November 1980 – 29 March 1983	2 years, 145 days	SPD	9th	
8		Egon Franke (1913–1995)		29 March 1983 – 18 February 1987	3 years, 326 days	SPD	10th	Franke refrained from presiding over the opening session of the 10th Bundestag as he was under investigation for embezzlement at the time (he was later acquitted). The function was assumed by the next oldest member of parliament, Willy Brandt (SPD, 1913–1992).
9		Willy Brandt (1913–1992)		18 February 1987 – 8 October 1992	5 years, 233 days	SPD	11th, 12th	
10		Alfred Dregger (1920–2002)		8 October 1992 – 10 November 1994	2 years, 33 days	CDU/CSU	12th	Dregger became the oldest member of the Bundestag due to the death of Brandt in the middle of the current legislative period; he never presided over the Bundestag.
11		Stefan Heym (1913–2001)		10 November 1994 – 31 October 1995	355 days	PDS	13th	
12		Alfred Dregger (1920–2002)		31 October 1995 – 26 October 1998	2 years, 360 days	CDU/CSU	13th	Dregger became the oldest member of the Bundestag, as Heym had resigned his seat; he never presided over the Bundestag.
13		Fred Gebhardt (1928–2000)		26 October 1998 – 16 August 2000	1 year, 295 days	PDS	14th	
14		Hans-Eberhard Urbaniak (1929–2024)		16 August 2000 – 17 October 2002	2 years, 62 days	SPD	14th	Urbaniak became the oldest member of parliament due to the death of Gebhardt in the middle of the current legislative period; he never presided over the Bundestag.
15		Otto Schily (born 1932)		17 October 2002 – 27 October 2009	7 years, 10 days	SPD	15th, 16th	
16		Heinz Riesenhuber (born 1935)		27 October 2009 – 1 June 2017	7 years, 217 days	CDU/CSU	17th, 18th	
17		Wolfgang Schäuble (1942–2023)	1972–2023	1 June 2017 – 26 December 2023	6 years, 63 days	CDU/CSU	18th, 19th, 20th	Schäuble technically became president by right of age towards the end of the 18th legislative session, after the standing rules were changed to put the longest-serving representative in that role. He refrained from presiding over the opening session of the 19th Bundestag as he stood for election as president of the Bundestag himself and did not want to preside over his own election. The function was assumed by the next longest-serving member of parliament, Hermann Otto Solms (FDP, 1980–2013 and 2017–2021).
18		Peter Ramsauer (born 1954)	1990–2025	26 December 2023 – 25 March 2025	1 year, 89 days	CDU/CSU	20th	Ramsauer became the longest serving member of parliament due to the death of Schäuble in the middle of the current legislative period; he never presided over the Bundestag.
19		Gregor Gysi (born 1948)	1990–2002 and since 2005	since 25 March 2025	1 year, 222 days	The Left	21st	

== Statistics ==
To date (2026), 18 different people have held the status of oldest or (since 2017) longest-serving member of the Bundestag. Of these, eleven have actually presided over the Bundestag in their capacity as president by right of age, while seven have never had the opportunity to do so. Six times, another Member presided over the Bundestag as a substitute for the oldest/longest-serving member.

Overall, the president by right of age (or a substitute) has had to preside over the Bundestag a total of 22 times; in 21 cases, this was at the beginning of the opening session of the legislative term when the presidency was still vacant. Only once, the president by right of age had to step in in a later session, when the entire Presidium was unable to attend.

List of members by number of opening sessions presided over
No. of sessions	3	2	1
Members	Willy Brandt (10th, 11th, 12th)	Marie Elisabeth Lüders (2nd, 3rd); Ludwig Erhard (7th, 8th); Otto Schily (15th, 16th); Heinz Riesenhuber (17th, 18th)	Paul Löbe (1st); Robert Pferdmenges (4th); Konrad Adenauer (5th); William Borm (6th); Herbert Wehner (9th); Stefan Heym (13th); Fred Gebhardt (14th); Hermann Otto Solms (19th); Wolfgang Schäuble (20th); Gregor Gysi (21st)
Members	(1)	(4)	(9)

One person presided as the oldest present member during a later meeting of the legislative session due to the incapacitation of the entire Presidium:

- Kurt Pohle (3rd; 18 April 1958)

== See also ==
- Father of the House
