= Paula Piechotta =

German politician (born 1986)

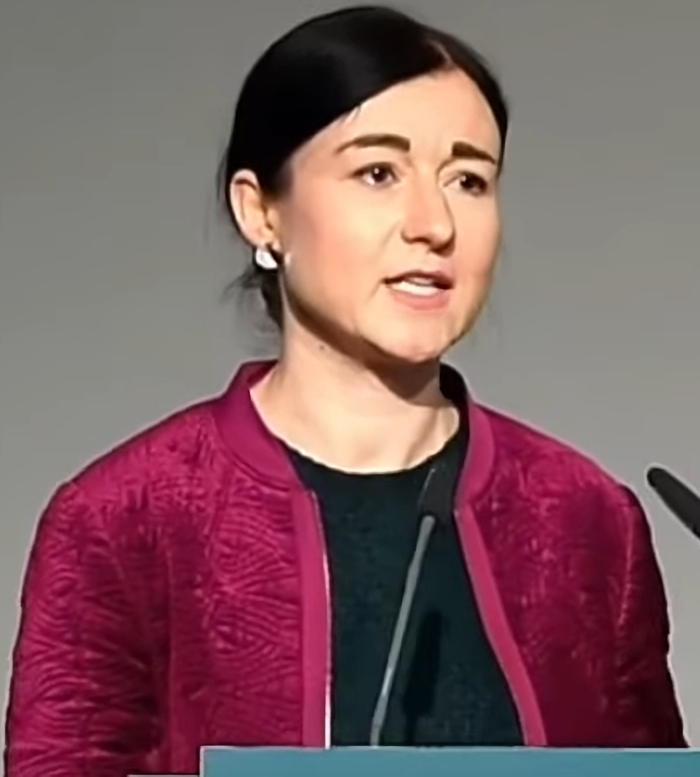
- Paula Piechotta in 2021

Member of the Bundestag
- Incumbent
- Assumed office 26 October 2021

Personal details
- Born: 19 September 1986 (age 39) Gera, East Germany (now Germany)
- Party: Alliance 90/The Greens

Paula Louise Piechotta (born 19 September 1986) is a German politician of Alliance 90/The Greens and a radiologist. She has been a member of the Bundestag since the 2021 elections.

== Early life and education ==
Piechotta was born 1986 in the East German city of Gera as a daughter of two theology scholars. She studied medicine and molecular medicine at the Friedrich Schiller University in Jena and earned her doctorate. She lives in Leipzig and works 2 days a month as a radiologist at the MedVZ of Leipzig University Hospital.

== Political career ==
Piechotta was a member of the youth organization of Alliance 90/The Greens and joined the party Alliance 90/The Greens in 2010. She ran for office in the Thuringian state elections in 2014 and then again in the state elections in Saxony in 2019. She was involved in the coalition negotiations after both state elections. In the German federal elections in 2021 and 2025 Piechotta secured a seat in parliament as the lead candidate of the Green Party in Saxony.

Piechotta's political focus is health policy. She advocates for more local pharmacies to ensure sufficient coverage of medicine supply and stands against the coverage of homeopathic medicine by health insurance companies. She is also committed to a science-based and socially just approach to climate policy and a well-functioning infrastructure. Piechotta's other key policy area is Eastern Germany.

In her first term as a member of the German parliament (2021-2025) Piechotta was a member of the Budget Committee, where she was responsible for the budget of the Federal Ministry of Digital Affairs and Transport and for the budget of the Federal Ministry of Health. On the Audit Committee, Piechotta was responsible for the Federal Ministry of Defense. As a deputy member of the Health Committee, Piechotta reported on medical equipment, pharmacies, and pharmaceuticals. She was also a deputy member of the Committee on Education, Research and Technology Assessment.

In her second term (2025-) Piechotta is once again on the Budget Committee, where she is responsible for reporting on the budgets of the Federal Ministry of Transport, the Federal Ministry of Health, and the Federal Ministry of Research, Technology, and Space. She also serves once again as representative of her parliamentary group on the Audit Committee. Additionally, Piechotta is a deputy member of the Health Committee and of the Defense Committee.

In the municipal elections in Leipzig on June 9, 2024 Piechotta was elected to the city council. She was the spokeswoman for economic policy for the faction of Alliance 90/The Greens and also a member of the Finance Committee and the Committee on Economic Affairs, Labor, and Digital Issue. She was also a deputy member of the Sports Committee.

In June 2025, Piechotta resigned from the Leipzig City Council. Given the very narrow margin of majority in both the Leipzig City Council and the German Bundestag, she did not want to jeopardize the formation of a majority by conflicting schedules. Anna-Lisa Möbius will replace her on the city council. The Leipzig City Council approved the resignation on June 25.

== Other activities ==
- Federal Foundation for the Reappraisal of the SED Dictatorship, Member of the Board of Trustees (since 2022)
