= List of members of the 19th Bundestag =

List of German legislators

19th Bundestag
| ← | 18th | 20th | → |
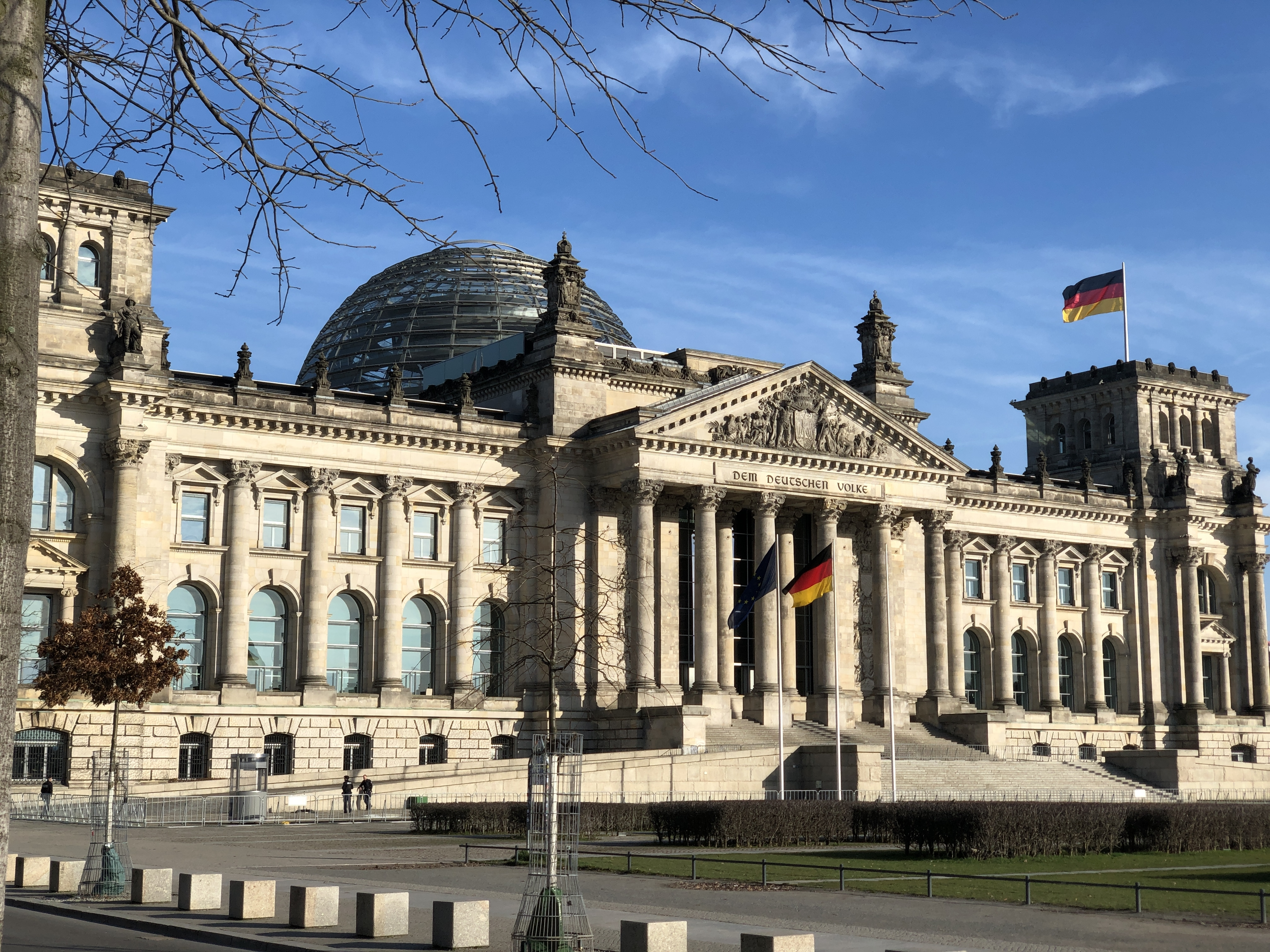
- Reichstag building in 2020

Overview
- Legislative body: Bundestag
- Jurisdiction: Germany
- Meeting place: Reichstag building, Berlin

Bundestag
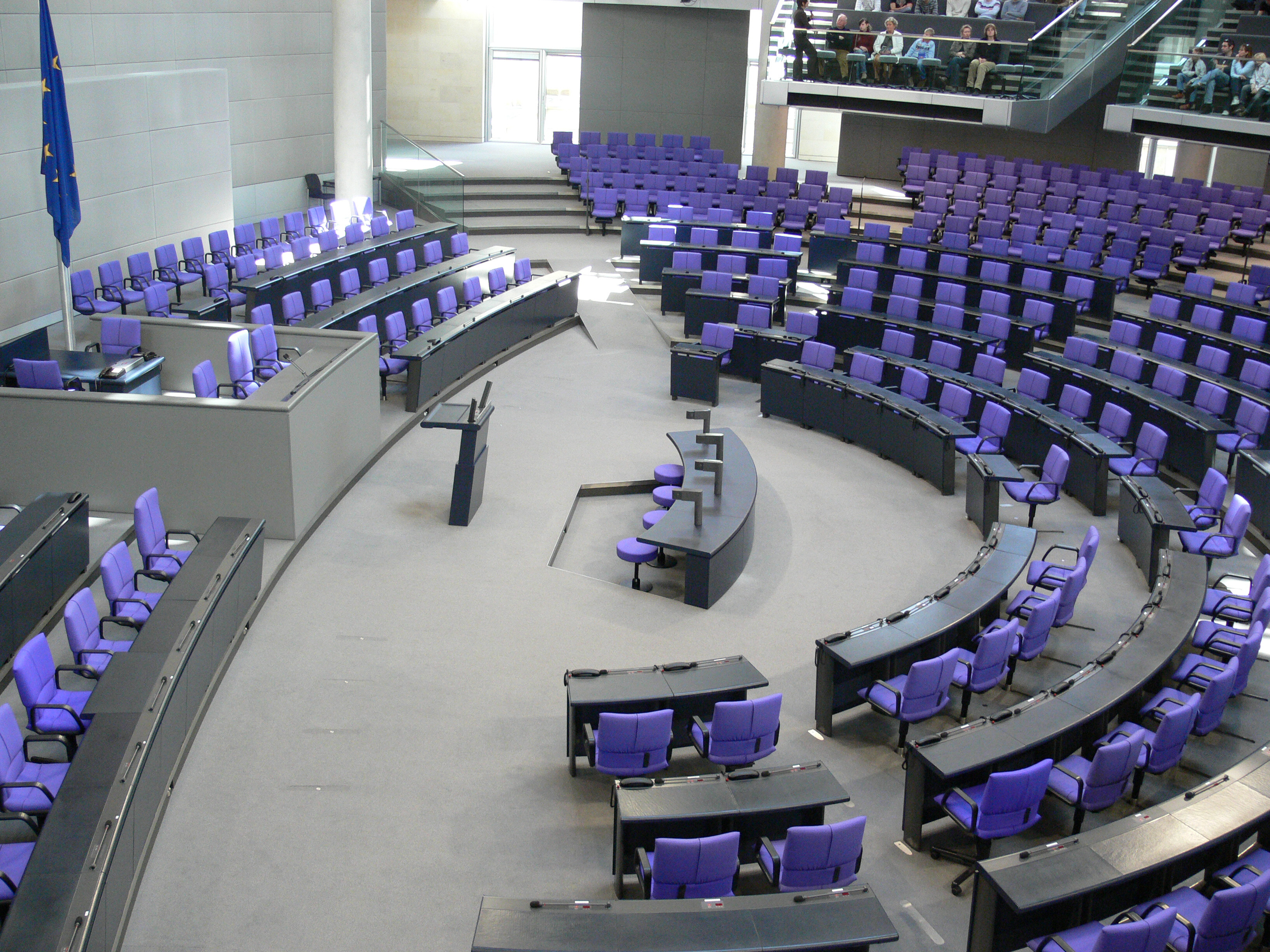
- Members: 736

This is a list of members of the 19th Bundestag – the lower house of parliament of the Federal Republic of Germany, whose members were in office from 24 October 2017 until 26 October 2021.

== Members ==
Constituencies and vote percentage are given for the members directly elected (first past the post) in the 299 Bundestag constituencies. The remaining members are elected via party lists in each state. Members who leave parliament are replaced by the next person on their party's state list.

| Image | Name | Year of birth | Party | State | Constituency (for directly elected members) | Constituency vote percentage (for directly elected members) | Remarks |
|---|---|---|---|---|---|---|---|
| | Michael von Abercron | 1952 | CDU | Schleswig-Holstein | Pinneberg | 39.7 % | |
| | Doris Achelwilm | 1976 | The Left | Bremen | | | |
| | Grigorios Aggelidis | 1965 | FDP | Lower Saxony | | | |
| | Gökay Akbulut | 1982 | The Left | Baden-Württemberg | | | |
| | Stephan Albani | 1968 | CDU | Lower Saxony | | | |
| | Renata Alt | 1965 | FDP | Baden-Württemberg | | | |
| | Norbert Altenkamp | 1972 | CDU | Hesse | Main-Taunus | 41.9 % | |
| | Peter Altmaier | 1958 | CDU | Saarland | Saarlouis | 38.0 % | |
| | Philipp Amthor | 1992 | CDU | Mecklenburg-Vorpommern | Mecklenburgische Seenplatte I – Vorpommern-Greifswald II | 31.2 % | |
| | Luise Amtsberg | 1984 | Greens | Schleswig-Holstein | | | |
| | Niels Annen | 1973 | SPD | Hamburg | Hamburg-Eimsbüttel | 31.6 % | |
| | Ingrid Arndt-Brauer | 1961 | SPD | North Rhine-Westphalia | | | |
| | Christine Aschenberg-Dugnus | 1959 | FDP | Schleswig-Holstein | | | |
| | Artur Auernhammer | 1963 | CSU | Bavaria | Ansbach | 44.3 % | |
| | Peter Aumer | 1976 | CSU | Bavaria | Regensburg | 40.1 % | |
| | Bela Bach | 1990 | SPD | Bavaria | | | Replaced Martin Burkert on 4 February 2020 |
| | Lisa Badum | 1983 | Greens | Bavaria | | | |
| | Heike Baehrens | 1955 | SPD | Baden-Württemberg | | | |
| | Annalena Baerbock | 1980 | Greens | Brandenburg | | | |
| | Ulrike Bahr | 1964 | SPD | Bavaria | | | |
| | Dorothee Bär | 1978 | CSU | Bavaria | Bad Kissingen | 51.1 % | |
| | Nezahat Baradari | 1965 | SPD | North Rhine-Westphalia | | | replaced Ulrich Kelber, 7 January 2019 |
| | Thomas Bareiß | 1975 | CDU | Baden-Württemberg | Zollernalb – Sigmaringen | 45.0 % | |
| | Doris Barnett | 1953 | SPD | Rhineland-Palatinate | | | |
| | Simone Barrientos | 1963 | The Left | Bavaria | | | |
| | Norbert Barthle | 1952 | CDU | Baden-Württemberg | Backnang – Schwäbisch Gmünd | 41.2 % | |
| | Matthias Bartke | 1959 | SPD | Hamburg | Hamburg-Altona | 28.9 % | |
| | Sören Bartol | 1974 | SPD | Hesse | Marburg | 35.7 % | |
| | Dietmar Bartsch | 1958 | The Left | Mecklenburg-Vorpommern | | | |
| | Bärbel Bas | 1968 | SPD | North Rhine-Westphalia | Duisburg I | 38.3 % | |
| | Nicole Bauer | 1987 | FDP | Bavaria | | | |
| | Bernd Baumann | 1958 | AfD | Hamburg | | | |
| | Margarete Bause | 1959 | Greens | Bavaria | | | |
| | Canan Bayram | 1966 | Greens | Berlin | Berlin-Friedrichshain-Kreuzberg – Prenzlauer Berg Ost | 26.3 % | |
| | Jens Beeck | 1969 | FDP | Lower Saxony | | | |
| | Olaf in der Beek | 1967 | FDP | North Rhine-Westphalia | | | |
| | Maik Beermann | 1981 | CDU | Lower Saxony | Nienburg II – Schaumburg | 40.6 % | |
| | Manfred Behrens | 1956 | CDU | Saxony-Anhalt | Börde – Jerichower Land | 37.8 % | |
| | Veronika Bellmann | 1960 | CDU | Saxony | Mittelsachsen | 32.4 % | |
| | Sybille Benning | 1961 | CDU | North Rhine-Westphalia | Münster | 37.2 % | |
| | André Berghegger | 1972 | CDU | Lower Saxony | Osnabrück-Land | 45.6 % | |
| | Marc Bernhard | 1972 | AfD | Baden-Württemberg | | | |
| | Melanie Bernstein | 1976 | CDU | Schleswig-Holstein | Plön – Neumünster | 40.7 % | |
| | Christoph Bernstiel | 1984 | CDU | Saxony-Anhalt | Halle | 27.1 % | |
| | Lorenz Gösta Beutin | 1978 | The Left | Schleswig-Holstein | | | |
| | Peter Beyer | 1970 | CDU | North Rhine-Westphalia | Mettmann II | 39.3 % | |
| | Marc Biadacz | 1979 | CDU | Baden-Württemberg | Böblingen | 38.8 % | |
| | Steffen Bilger | 1979 | CDU | Baden-Württemberg | Ludwigsburg | 38.3 % | |
| | Lothar Binding | 1950 | SPD | Baden-Württemberg | | | |
| | Matthias W. Birkwald | 1961 | The Left | North Rhine-Westphalia | | | |
| | Andreas Bleck | 1988 | AfD | Rhineland-Palatinate | | | |
| | Peter Bleser | 1952 | CDU | Rhineland-Palatinate | Mosel/Rhein-Hunsrück | 44.1 % | |
| | Heidrun Bluhm | 1958 | The Left | Mecklenburg-Vorpommern | | | |
| | Peter Boehringer | 1969 | AfD | Bavaria | | | |
| | Norbert Brackmann | 1954 | CDU | Schleswig-Holstein | Herzogtum Lauenburg – Stormarn-Süd | 39.5 % | |
| | Michael Brand | 1973 | CDU | Hesse | Fulda | 45.2 % | |
| | Jens Brandenburg | 1986 | FDP | Baden-Württemberg | | | |
| | Mario Brandenburg | 1983 | FDP | Rhineland-Palatinate | | | |
| | Reinhard Brandl | 1977 | CSU | Bavaria | Ingolstadt | 49.5 % | |
| | Stephan Brandner | 1966 | AfD | Thuringia | | | |
| | Michel Brandt | 1990 | The Left | Baden-Württemberg | | | |
| | Franziska Brantner | 1979 | Greens | Baden-Württemberg | | | |
| | Helge Braun | 1972 | CDU | Hesse | Gießen | 35.1 % | |
| | Jürgen Braun | 1961 | AfD | Baden-Württemberg | | | |
| | Eberhard Brecht | 1950 | SPD | Saxony-Anhalt | | | Replaced Burkhard Lischka on 25 October 2019. |
| | Silvia Breher | 1973 | CDU | Lower Saxony | Cloppenburg – Vechta | 57.7 % | |
| | Sebastian Brehm | 1971 | CSU | Bavaria | Nuremberg North | 31.3 % | |
| | Heike Brehmer | 1962 | CDU | Saxony-Anhalt | Harz | 36.4 % | |
| | Leni Breymaier | 1960 | SPD | Baden-Württemberg | | | |
| | Ralph Brinkhaus | 1968 | CDU | North Rhine-Westphalia | Gütersloh I | 46.6 % | |
| | Carsten Brodesser | 1967 | CDU | North Rhine-Westphalia | Oberbergischer Kreis | 43.7 % | |
| | Agnieszka Brugger | 1985 | Greens | Baden-Württemberg | | | |
| | Karl-Heinz Brunner | 1953 | SPD | Bavaria | | | |
| | Sandra Bubendorfer-Licht | 1969 | FDP | Bavaria | | | replaced Jimmy Schulz on 9 December 2019 |
| | Christine Buchholz | 1971 | The Left | Hesse | | | |
| | Katrin Budde | 1965 | SPD | Saxony-Anhalt | | | |
| | Marcus Bühl | 1977 | AfD | Thuringia | | | |
| | Birke Bull-Bischoff | 1963 | The Left | Saxony-Anhalt | | | |
| | Marco Bülow | 1971 | Die PARTEI (ex-SPD) | North Rhine-Westphalia | Dortmund I | 38.8 % | won election as SPD member, left party and parliamentary group on 26 November 2018 |
| | Marco Buschmann | 1977 | FDP | North Rhine-Westphalia | | | |
| | Karlheinz Busen | 1951 | FDP | North Rhine-Westphalia | | | |
| | Matthias Büttner | 1990 | AfD | Saxony-Anhalt | | | |
| | Petr Bystron | 1972 | AfD | Bavaria | | | |
| | Lars Castellucci | 1974 | SPD | Baden-Württemberg | | | |
| | Jörg Cezanne | 1958 | The Left | Hesse | | | |
| | Anna Christmann | 1983 | Greens | Baden-Württemberg | | | |
| | Tino Chrupalla | 1975 | AfD | Saxony | Görlitz | 32.4 % | |
| | Gitta Connemann | 1964 | CDU | Lower Saxony | Unterems | 50.0 % | |
| | Joana Cotar | 1973 | AfD | Hesse | | | |
| | Carl-Julius Cronenberg | 1962 | FDP | North Rhine-Westphalia | | | |
| | Gottfried Curio | 1960 | AfD | Berlin | | | |
| | Sevim Dağdelen | 1975 | The Left | North Rhine-Westphalia | | | |
| | Bernhard Daldrup | 1956 | SPD | North Rhine-Westphalia | | | |
| | Astrid Damerow | 1958 | CDU | Schleswig-Holstein | Nordfriesland – Dithmarschen Nord | 45.1 % | |
| | Britta Dassler | 1964 | FDP | Bavaria | | | |
| | Diether Dehm | 1950 | The Left | Lower Saxony | | | |
| | Ekin Deligöz | 1971 | Greens | Bavaria | | | |
| | Karamba Diaby | 1961 | SPD | Saxony-Anhalt | | | |
| | Esther Dilcher | 1965 | SPD | Hesse | Waldeck | 35.1 % | |
| | Sabine Dittmar | 1964 | SPD | Bavaria | | | |
| | Bijan Djir-Sarai | 1976 | FDP | North Rhine-Westphalia | | | |
| | Alexander Dobrindt | 1970 | CSU | Bavaria | Weilheim | 47.9 % | |
| | Anke Domscheit-Berg | 1968 | The Left | Brandenburg | | | Elected on party list and member of The Left parliamentary group, but not a party member |
| | Michael Donth | 1967 | CDU | Baden-Württemberg | Reutlingen | 40.8 % | |
| | Katja Dörner | 1976 | Greens | North Rhine-Westphalia | | | |
| | Marie-Luise Dött | 1953 | CDU | North Rhine-Westphalia | | | |
| | Siegbert Droese | 1969 | AfD | Saxony | | | |
| | Katharina Dröge | 1984 | Greens | North Rhine-Westphalia | | | |
| | Christian Dürr | 1977 | FDP | Lower Saxony | | | |
| | Hansjörg Durz | 1971 | CSU | Bavaria | Augsburg-Land | 47.8 % | |
| | Hartmut Ebbing | 1956 | FDP | Berlin | | | |
| | Harald Ebner | 1964 | Greens | Baden-Württemberg | | | |
| | Thomas Ehrhorn | 1959 | AfD | Lower Saxony | | | |
| | Berengar Elsner von Gronow | 1978 | AfD | North Rhine-Westphalia | | | |
| | Marcel Emmerich | 1991 | Greens | Baden-Württemberg | | | Replaced Danyal Bayaz on 1 June 2021 |
| | Thomas Erndl | 1974 | CSU | Bavaria | Deggendorf | 44.1 % | |
| | Klaus Ernst | 1954 | The Left | Bavaria | | | |
| | Wiebke Esdar | 1984 | SPD | North Rhine-Westphalia | Bielefeld – Gütersloh II | 33.2 % | |
| | Saskia Esken | 1961 | SPD | Baden-Württemberg | | | |
| | Michael Espendiller | 1989 | AfD | North Rhine-Westphalia | | | |
| | Marcus Faber | 1984 | FDP | Saxony-Anhalt | | | |
| | Yasmin Fahimi | 1967 | SPD | Lower Saxony | Stadt Hannover II | 33.7 % | |
| | Hermann Färber | 1963 | CDU | Baden-Württemberg | Göppingen | 37.6 % | |
| | Johannes Fechner | 1972 | SPD | Baden-Württemberg | | | |
| | Uwe Feiler | 1965 | CDU | Brandenburg | Oberhavel – Havelland II | 29.9 % | |
| | Fritz Felgentreu | 1968 | SPD | Berlin | Berlin-Neukölln | 26.8 % | |
| | Peter Felser | 1969 | AfD | Bavaria | | | |
| | Enak Ferlemann | 1963 | CDU | Lower Saxony | Cuxhaven – Stade II | 42.7 % | |
| | Susanne Ferschl | 1973 | The Left | Bavaria | | | |
| | Axel Fischer | 1966 | CDU | Baden-Württemberg | Karlsruhe-Land | 40.4 % | |
| | Maria Flachsbarth | 1963 | CDU | Lower Saxony | | | |
| | Daniel Föst | 1976 | FDP | Bavaria | | | |
| | Edgar Franke | 1960 | SPD | Hesse | Schwalm-Eder | 37.7 % | |
| | Ulrich Freese | 1951 | SPD | Brandenburg | | | |
| | Thorsten Frei | 1973 | CDU | Baden-Württemberg | Schwarzwald-Baar | 47.0 % | |
| | Brigitte Freihold | 1955 | The Left | Rhineland-Palatinate | | | |
| | Dagmar Freitag | 1953 | SPD | North Rhine-Westphalia | Märkischer Kreis II | 38.6 % | |
| | Otto Fricke | 1965 | FDP | North Rhine-Westphalia | | | |
| | Dietmar Friedhoff | 1966 | AfD | Lower Saxony | | | |
| | Hans-Peter Friedrich | 1957 | CSU | Bavaria | Hof | 47.0 % | |
| | Anton Friesen | 1985 | AfD | Thuringia | | | |
| | Michael Frieser | 1964 | CSU | Bavaria | Nuremberg South | 35.6 % | |
| | Markus Frohnmaier | 1991 | AfD | Baden-Württemberg | | | |
| | Götz Frömming | 1968 | AfD | Berlin | | | |
| | Hans-Joachim Fuchtel | 1952 | CDU | Baden-Württemberg | Calw | 43.3 % | |
| | Sylvia Gabelmann | 1958 | The Left | North Rhine-Westphalia | | | |
| | Ingo Gädechens | 1960 | CDU | Schleswig-Holstein | Ostholstein – Stormarn-Nord | 41.5 % | |
| | Matthias Gastel | 1970 | Greens | Baden-Württemberg | | | |
| | Alexander Gauland | 1941 | AfD | Brandenburg | | | |
| | Thomas Gebhart | 1971 | CDU | Rhineland-Palatinate | Südpfalz | 40.3 % | |
| | Kai Gehring | 1977 | Greens | North Rhine-Westphalia | | | |
| | Axel Gehrke | 1942 | AfD | Schleswig-Holstein | | | |
| | Stefan Gelbhaar | 1976 | Greens | Berlin | | | |
| | Michael Gerdes | 1960 | SPD | North Rhine-Westphalia | Bottrop – Recklinghausen III | 36.8 % | |
| | Alois Gerig | 1956 | CDU | Baden-Württemberg | Odenwald – Tauber | 46.8 % | |
| | Martin Gerster | 1971 | SPD | Baden-Württemberg | | | |
| | Eberhard Gienger | 1951 | CDU | Baden-Württemberg | Neckar-Zaber | 40.0 % | |
| | Albrecht Glaser | 1942 | AfD | Hesse | | | |
| | Angelika Glöckner | 1962 | SPD | Rhineland-Palatinate | | | |
| | Franziska Gminder | 1945 | AfD | Baden-Württemberg | | | |
| | Eckhard Gnodtke | 1958 | CDU | Saxony-Anhalt | Altmark | 32.6 % | |
| | Nicole Gohlke | 1975 | The Left | Bavaria | | | |
| | Katrin Göring-Eckardt | 1966 | Greens | Thuringia | | | |
| | Wilhelm von Gottberg | 1940 | AfD | Lower Saxony | | | |
| | Kay Gottschalk | 1965 | AfD | North Rhine-Westphalia | | | |
| | Timon Gremmels | 1976 | SPD | Hesse | Kassel | 35.5 % | |
| | Kerstin Griese | 1966 | SPD | North Rhine-Westphalia | | | |
| | Ursula Groden-Kranich | 1965 | CDU | Rhineland-Palatinate | Mainz | 35.7 % | |
| | Hermann Gröhe | 1961 | CDU | North Rhine-Westphalia | Neuss I | 44.0 % | |
| | Klaus-Dieter Gröhler | 1966 | CDU | Berlin | Berlin-Charlottenburg-Wilmersdorf | 30.2 % | |
| | Michael Groß | 1956 | SPD | North Rhine-Westphalia | Recklinghausen II | 41.1 % | |
| | Michael Grosse-Brömer | 1960 | CDU | Lower Saxony | Harburg | 40.6 % | |
| | Astrid Grotelüschen | 1964 | CDU | Lower Saxony | Delmenhorst – Wesermarsch – Oldenburg-Land | 34.1 % | |
| | Uli Grötsch | 1975 | SPD | Bavaria | | | |
| | Markus Grübel | 1959 | CDU | Baden-Württemberg | Esslingen | 40.0 % | |
| | Manfred Grund | 1955 | CDU | Thuringia | Eichsfeld – Nordhausen – Kyffhäuserkreis | 38.0 % | |
| | Erhard Grundl | 1963 | Greens | Bavaria | | | |
| | Oliver Grundmann | 1971 | CDU | Lower Saxony | Stade I – Rotenburg II | 44.4 % | |
| | Monika Grütters | 1962 | CDU | Berlin | | | |
| | Fritz Güntzler | 1966 | CDU | Lower Saxony | | | |
| | Olav Gutting | 1970 | CDU | Baden-Württemberg | Bruchsal – Schwetzingen | 41.5 % | |
| | Gregor Gysi | 1948 | The Left | Berlin | Berlin-Treptow-Köpenick | 39.9 % | |
| | Christian Haase | 1966 | CDU | North Rhine-Westphalia | Höxter – Lippe II | 44.3 % | |
| | Thomas Hacker | 1967 | FDP | Bavaria | | | |
| | Bettina Hagedorn | 1955 | SPD | Schleswig-Holstein | | | |
| | Rita Hagl-Kehl | 1970 | SPD | Bavaria | | | |
| | André Hahn | 1963 | The Left | Saxony | | | |
| | Florian Hahn | 1974 | CSU | Bavaria | München-Land | 43.5 % | |
| | Anja Hajduk | 1963 | The Left | Hamburg | | | |
| | Metin Hakverdi | 1969 | SPD | Hamburg | Hamburg-Bergedorf – Harburg | 34.8 % | |
| | Armin-Paul Hampel | 1957 | AfD | Lower Saxony | | | |
| | Reginald Hanke | 1956 | FDP | Thuringia | | | Replaced Thomas Kemmerich on 15 November 2019 |
| | Heike Hänsel | 1966 | The Left | Baden-Württemberg | | | |
| | Mariana Harder-Kühnel | 1974 | AfD | Hesse | | | |
| | Jürgen Hardt | 1963 | CDU | North Rhine-Westphalia | Solingen – Remscheid – Wuppertal II | 38.2 % | |
| | Sebastian Hartmann | 1977 | SPD | North Rhine-Westphalia | | | |
| | Verena Hartmann | 1974 | Independent (formerly AfD) | Saxony | | | |
| | Roland Hartwig | 1954 | AfD | North Rhine-Westphalia | | | |
| | Britta Haßelmann | 1961 | Greens | North Rhine-Westphalia | | | |
| | Matthias Hauer | 1977 | CDU | North Rhine-Westphalia | Essen III | 37.1 % | |
| | Jochen Haug | 1973 | AfD | North Rhine-Westphalia | | | |
| | Martin Hebner | 1959 | AfD | Bavaria | | | |
| | Dirk Heidenblut | 1961 | SPD | North Rhine-Westphalia | Essen II | 37.3 % | |
| | Matthias Heider | 1966 | CDU | North Rhine-Westphalia | Olpe – Märkischer Kreis I | 47.9 % | |
| | Peter Heidt | 1965 | FDP | Hesse | | | Replaced Nicola Beer, 1 July 2019. |
| | Hubertus Heil | 1972 | SPD | Lower Saxony | Gifhorn – Peine | 37.8 % | |
| | Mechthild Heil | 1961 | CDU | Rhineland-Palatinate | Ahrweiler | 42.8 % | |
| | Thomas Heilmann | 1964 | CDU | Berlin | Berlin-Steglitz-Zehlendorf | 35.4 % | |
| | Frank Heinrich | 1964 | CDU | Saxony | Chemnitz | 26.6 % | |
| | Gabriela Heinrich | 1963 | SPD | Bavaria | | | |
| | Marcus Held | 1977 | SPD | Rhineland-Palatinate | | | |
| | Mark Helfrich | 1978 | CDU | Schleswig-Holstein | Steinburg – Dithmarschen Süd | 41.9 % | |
| | Katrin Helling-Plahr | 1986 | FDP | North Rhine-Westphalia | | | |
| | Wolfgang Hellmich | 1958 | SPD | North Rhine-Westphalia | | | |
| | Udo Hemmelgarn | 1959 | AfD | North Rhine-Westphalia | | | |
| | Barbara Hendricks | 1952 | SPD | North Rhine-Westphalia | | | |
| | Rudolf Henke | 1954 | CDU | North Rhine-Westphalia | Aachen I | 33.7 % | |
| | Michael Hennrich | 1965 | CDU | Baden-Württemberg | Nürtingen | 39.4 % | |
| | Marc Henrichmann | 1976 | CDU | North Rhine-Westphalia | Coesfeld – Steinfurt II | 51.6 % | |
| | Markus Herbrand | 1971 | FDP | North Rhine-Westphalia | | | |
| | Torsten Herbst | 1973 | FDP | Saxony | | | |
| | Waldemar Herdt | 1962 | AfD | Lower Saxony | | | |
| | Lars Hermann | 1977 | Independent (ex AfD) | Saxony | | | Elected on the AfD list, left the party and the parliamentary group on 18 December 2019 |
| | Gustav Herzog | 1958 | SPD | Rhineland-Palatinate | Kaiserslautern | 33.9 % | |
| | Martin Hess | 1971 | AfD | Baden-Württemberg | | | |
| | Katja Hessel | 1972 | FDP | Bavaria | | | |
| | Heiko Heßenkemper | 1956 | AfD | Saxony | | | |
| | Ansgar Heveling | 1972 | CDU | North Rhine-Westphalia | Krefeld I – Neuss II | 42.4 % | |
| | Gabriele Hiller-Ohm | 1953 | SPD | Schleswig-Holstein | | | |
| | Karsten Hilse | 1964 | AfD | Saxony | Bautzen I | 33.2 % | |
| | Christian Hirte | 1976 | CDU | Thuringia | Eisenach – Wartburgkreis – Unstrut-Hainich-Kreis | 34.4 % | |
| | Heribert Hirte | 1958 | CDU | North Rhine-Westphalia | Cologne II | 34.9 % | |
| | Thomas Hitschler | 1982 | SPD | Rhineland-Palatinate | | | |
| | Nicole Höchst | 1970 | AfD | Rhineland-Palatinate | | | |
| | Gero Clemens Hocker | 1975 | FDP | Lower Saxony | | | |
| | Manuel Höferlin | 1973 | FDP | Rhineland-Palatinate | | | |
| | Alexander Hoffmann | 1975 | CSU | Bavaria | Main-Spessart | 46.6 % | |
| | Bettina Hoffmann | 1960 | Greens | Hesse | | | |
| | Christoph Hoffmann | 1957 | FDP | Baden-Württemberg | | | |
| | Anton Hofreiter | 1970 | Greens | Bavaria | | | |
| | Martin Hohmann | 1948 | AfD | Hesse | | | |
| | Matthias Höhn | 1975 | The Left | Saxony-Anhalt | | | |
| | Bruno Hollnagel | 1948 | AfD | Schleswig-Holstein | | | |
| | Leif-Erik Holm | 1970 | AfD | Mecklenburg-Vorpommern | | | |
| | Karl Holmeier | 1956 | CSU | Bavaria | Schwandorf | 48.5 % | |
| | Ottmar von Holtz | 1961 | Greens | Lower Saxony | | | |
| | Hendrik Hoppenstedt | 1972 | CDU | Lower Saxony | Hannover-Land I | 40.1 % | |
| | Reinhard Houben | 1960 | FDP | North Rhine-Westphalia | | | |
| | Johannes Huber | 1987 | AfD | Bavaria | | | |
| | Andrej Hunko | 1963 | The Left | North Rhine-Westphalia | | | |
| | Ulla Ihnen | 1956 | FDP | Lower Saxony | | | |
| | Erich Irlstorfer | 1970 | CSU | Bavaria | Freising | 43.0 % | |
| | Hans-Jürgen Irmer | 1952 | CDU | Hesse | Lahn-Dill | 38.3 % | |
| | Fabian Jacobi | 1973 | AfD | North Rhine-Westphalia | | | |
| | Dieter Janecek | 1976 | Greens | Bavaria | | | |
| | Thomas Jarzombek | 1973 | CDU | North Rhine-Westphalia | Düsseldorf I | 40.4 % | |
| | Ulla Jelpke | 1951 | The Left | North Rhine-Westphalia | | | |
| | Gyde Jensen | 1989 | FDP | Schleswig-Holstein | | | replaced Bernd Buchholz, 25 September 2017 |
| | Marc Jongen | 1968 | AfD | Baden-Württemberg | | | |
| | Andreas Jung | 1975 | CDU | Baden-Württemberg | Konstanz | 44.8 % | |
| | Christian Jung | 1977 | FDP | Baden-Württemberg | | | |
| | Ingmar Jung | 1978 | CDU | Hesse | Wiesbaden | 34.3 % | |
| | Frank Junge | 1967 | SPD | Mecklenburg-Vorpommern | | | |
| | Josip Juratovic | 1959 | SPD | Baden-Württemberg | | | |
| | Thomas Jurk | 1962 | SPD | Saxony | | | |
| | Oliver Kaczmarek | 1970 | SPD | North Rhine-Westphalia | Unna I | 38.8 % | |
| | Elisabeth Kaiser | 1987 | SPD | Thuringia | | | |
| | Uwe Kamann | 1958 | LKR (ex AfD) | North Rhine-Westphalia | | | elected on the AfD list, left party and parliamentary group on 17 December 2018 |
| | Kirsten Kappert-Gonther | 1966 | Greens | Bremen | | | |
| | Ralf Kapschack | 1954 | SPD | North Rhine-Westphalia | Ennepe-Ruhr-Kreis II | 36.7 % | |
| | Alois Karl | 1950 | CSU | Bavaria | Amberg | 47.7 % | |
| | Anja Karliczek | 1971 | CDU | North Rhine-Westphalia | Steinfurt III | 44.8 % | |
| | Torbjörn Kartes | 1979 | CDU | Rhineland-Palatinate | Ludwigshafen/Frankenthal | 32.1 % | |
| | Kerstin Kassner | 1958 | The Left | Mecklenburg-Vorpommern | | | |
| | Gabriele Katzmarek | 1960 | SPD | Baden-Württemberg | | | |
| | Volker Kauder | 1949 | CDU | Baden-Württemberg | Rottweil – Tuttlingen | 43.0 % | |
| | Stefan Kaufmann | 1969 | CDU | Baden-Württemberg | Stuttgart I | 32.0 % | |
| | Uwe Kekeritz | 1953 | Greens | Bavaria | | | |
| | Ronja Kemmer | 1989 | CDU | Baden-Württemberg | Ulm | 42.7 % | |
| | Achim Kessler | 1964 | The Left | Hesse | | | |
| | Jens Kestner | 1971 | AfD | Lower Saxony | | | |
| | Katja Keul | 1969 | Greens | Lower Saxony | | | |
| | Stefan Keuter | 1972 | AfD | North Rhine-Westphalia | | | |
| | Roderich Kiesewetter | 1963 | CDU | Baden-Württemberg | Aalen – Heidenheim | 46.4 % | |
| | Michael Kießling | 1973 | CSU | Bavaria | Starnberg – Landsberg | 42.1 % | |
| | Sven-Christian Kindler | 1985 | Greens | Lower Saxony | | | |
| | Georg Kippels | 1959 | CDU | North Rhine-Westphalia | Rhein-Erft-Kreis I | 39.2 % | |
| | Katja Kipping | 1978 | The Left | Saxony | | | |
| | Cansel Kiziltepe | 1975 | SPD | Berlin | | | |
| | Arno Klare | 1952 | SPD | North Rhine-Westphalia | Mülheim – Essen I | 34.9 % | |
| | Karsten Klein | 1977 | FDP | Bavaria | | | |
| | Volkmar Klein | 1960 | CDU | North Rhine-Westphalia | Siegen-Wittgenstein | 40.1 % | |
| | Maria Klein-Schmeink | 1958 | Greens | North Rhine-Westphalia | | | |
| | Norbert Kleinwächter | 1986 | AfD | Brandenburg | | | |
| | Lars Klingbeil | 1978 | SPD | Lower Saxony | Rotenburg I - Heidekreis | 41.2 % | |
| | Marcel Klinge | 1980 | FDP | Baden-Württemberg | | | |
| alternativtext= | Daniela Kluckert | 1980 | FDP | Berlin | | | |
| | Axel Knoerig | 1967 | CDU | Lower Saxony | Diepholz – Nienburg I | 44.6 % | |
| | Pascal Kober | 1971 | FDP | Baden-Württemberg | | | |
| | Jens Koeppen | 1962 | CDU | Brandenburg | Uckermark – Barnim I | 30.6 % | |
| | Bärbel Kofler | 1967 | SPD | Bavaria | | | |
| | Lukas Köhler | 1986 | FDP | Bavaria | | | |
| | Daniela Kolbe | 1980 | SPD | Saxony | | | |
| | Enrico Komning | 1968 | AfD | Mecklenburg-Vorpommern | | | |
| | Jörn König | 1967 | AfD | Lower Saxony | | | |
| | Carina Konrad | 1982 | FDP | Rhineland-Palatinate | | | |
| | Markus Koob | 1977 | CDU | Hesse | Hochtaunus | 39.9 % | |
| | Carsten Körber | 1979 | CDU | Saxony | Zwickau | 33.7 % | |
| | Elvan Korkmaz | 1985 | SPD | North Rhine-Westphalia | | | |
| | Jan Korte | 1977 | The Left | Saxony-Anhalt | | | |
| | Steffen Kotré | 1971 | AfD | Brandenburg | | | |
| | Sylvia Kotting-Uhl | 1952 | Greens | Baden-Württemberg | | | |
| | Rainer Kraft | 1974 | AfD | Bavaria | | | |
| | Anette Kramme | 1967 | SPD | Bavaria | | | |
| | Alexander Krauß | 1975 | CDU | Saxony | Erzgebirgskreis I | 34.7 % | |
| | Jutta Krellmann | 1956 | The Left | Lower Saxony | | | |
| | Gunther Krichbaum | 1964 | CDU | Baden-Württemberg | Pforzheim | 36.4 % | |
| | Günter Krings | 1969 | CDU | North Rhine-Westphalia | Mönchengladbach | 44.3 % | |
| | Oliver Krischer | 1969 | Greens | North Rhine-Westphalia | | | |
| | Rüdiger Kruse | 1961 | CDU | Hamburg | | | |
| | Wolfgang Kubicki | 1952 | FDP | Schleswig-Holstein | | | |
| | Michael Kuffer | 1972 | CSU | Bavaria | Munich South | 33.0 % | |
| | Konstantin Kuhle | 1989 | FDP | Lower Saxony | | | |
| | Christian Kühn | 1979 | Greens | Baden-Württemberg | | | |
| | Stephan Kühn | 1979 | Greens | Saxony | | | |
| | Roy Kühne | 1967 | CDU | Lower Saxony | Goslar – Northeim – Osterode | 39.8 % | |
| | Alexander Kulitz | 1981 | FDP | Baden-Württemberg | | | |
| | Renate Künast | 1955 | Greens | Berlin | | | |
| | Markus Kurth | 1966 | Greens | North Rhine-Westphalia | | | |
| | Christine Lambrecht | 1965 | SPD | Hesse | | | |
| | Alexander Graf Lambsdorff | 1966 | FDP | North Rhine-Westphalia | | | |
| | Karl A. Lamers | 1951 | CDU | Baden-Württemberg | Heidelberg | 32.7 % | |
| | Andreas Lämmel | 1959 | CDU | Saxony | Dresden I | 24.6 % | |
| | Katharina Landgraf | 1954 | CDU | Saxony | Leipzig-Land | 34.1 % | |
| | Christian Lange | 1964 | SPD | Baden-Württemberg | | | |
| | Ulrich Lange | 1969 | CSU | Bavaria | Donau-Ries | 47.0 % | |
| | Silke Launert | 1976 | CSU | Bavaria | Bayreuth | 46.5 % | |
| | Karl Lauterbach | 1963 | SPD | North Rhine-Westphalia | Leverkusen – Cologne IV | 38.7 % | |
| | Caren Lay | 1972 | The Left | Saxony | | | |
| | Monika Lazar | 1967 | Greens | Saxony | | | |
| | Ulrich Lechte | 1977 | FDP | Bavaria | | | |
| | Jens Lehmann | 1967 | CDU | Saxony | Leipzig I | 27.5 % | |
| | Sven Lehmann | 1979 | Greens | North Rhine-Westphalia | | | |
| | Sylvia Lehmann | 1954 | SPD | Brandenburg | | | Replaced Manja Schüle, 3 December 2019 |
| | Paul Lehrieder | 1959 | CSU | Bavaria | Würzburg | 42.2 % | |
| | Sabine Leidig | 1961 | The Left | Hesse | | | |
| | Katja Leikert | 1975 | CDU | Hesse | Hanau | 35.3 % | |
| | Steffi Lemke | 1968 | Greens | Saxony-Anhalt | | | |
| | Ralph Lenkert | 1967 | The Left | Thuringia | | | |
| | Andreas Lenz | 1981 | CSU | Bavaria | Erding – Ebersberg | 48.2 % | |
| | Michael Leutert | 1974 | The Left | Saxony | | | |
| | Antje Lezius | 1960 | CDU | Rhineland-Palatinate | Kreuznach (electoral district) | 37.0 % | |
| | Stefan Liebich | 1972 | The Left | Berlin | Berlin-Pankow | 28.8 % | |
| | Helge Lindh | 1976 | SPD | North Rhine-Westphalia | Wuppertal I | 31.5 % | |
| | Andrea Lindholz | 1970 | CSU | Bavaria | Aschaffenburg | 48.1 % | |
| | Christian Lindner | 1979 | FDP | North Rhine-Westphalia | | | |
| | Tobias Lindner | 1982 | Greens | Rhineland-Palatinate | | | |
| | Michael Georg Link | 1963 | FDP | Baden-Württemberg | | | |
| | Carsten Linnemann | 1977 | CDU | North Rhine-Westphalia | Paderborn – Gütersloh III | 53.3 % | |
| | Patricia Lips | 1963 | CDU | Hesse | Odenwald | 36.1 % | |
| | Nikolas Löbel | 1986 | CDU | Baden-Württemberg | Mannheim | 29.3 % | |
| | Bernhard Loos | 1955 | CSU | Bavaria | Munich North | 32.2 % | |
| | Gesine Lötzsch | 1961 | The Left | Berlin | Berlin-Lichtenberg | 34.8 % | |
| | Rüdiger Lucassen | 1951 | AfD | North Rhine-Westphalia | | | |
| | Jan-Marco Luczak | 1975 | CDU | Berlin | Berlin-Tempelhof-Schöneberg | 28.9 % | |
| | Daniela Ludwig | 1975 | CSU | Bavaria | Rosenheim | 45.9 % | |
| | Saskia Ludwig | 1975 | CDU | Brandenburg | | | Replaced Michael Stübgen on 3 December 2019 |
| | Kirsten Lühmann | 1964 | SPD | Lower Saxony | | | |
| | Oliver Luksic | 1979 | FDP | Saarland | | | |
| | Thomas Lutze | 1969 | The Left | Saarland | | | |
| | Karin Maag | 1962 | CDU | Baden-Württemberg | Stuttgart II | 33.5 % | |
| | Heiko Maas | 1966 | SPD | Saarland | | | |
| | Isabel Mackensen-Geis | 1986 | SPD | Rhineland-Palatinate | | | Replaced Katarina Barley on 2 July 2019 |
| | Frank Magnitz | 1952 | AfD | Bremen | | | |
| | Yvonne Magwas | 1979 | CDU | Saxony | Vogtlandkreis | 35.0 % | |
| | Jens Maier | 1962 | AfD | Saxony | | | |
| | Lothar Maier | 1944 | AfD | Baden-Württemberg | | | |
| | Thomas de Maizière | 1954 | CDU | Saxony | Meißen | 36.7 % | |
| | Birgit Malsack-Winkemann | 1964 | AfD | Berlin | | | |
| | Gisela Manderla | 1958 | CDU | North Rhine-Westphalia | | | replaced Ralf Brauksiepe on 5 November 2018 |
| | Astrid Mannes | 1967 | CDU | Hesse | Darmstadt | 30.7 % | |
| | Till Mansmann | 1968 | FDP | Hesse | | | |
| | Caren Marks | 1963 | SPD | Lower Saxony | | | |
| | Matern von Marschall | 1962 | CDU | Baden-Württemberg | Freiburg | 28.0 % | |
| | Jürgen Martens | 1959 | FDP | Saxony | | | |
| | Dorothee Martin | 1978 | SPD | Hamburg | | | Replaced Johannes Kahrs on 11 May 2020. |
| | Hans-Georg von der Marwitz | 1961 | CDU | Brandenburg | Märkisch-Oderland – Barnim II | 28.4 % | |
| | Fabio De Masi | 1980 | The Left | Hamburg | | | |
| | Katja Mast | 1971 | SPD | Baden-Württemberg | | | |
| | Christoph Matschie | 1961 | SPD | Thuringia | | | |
| | Andreas Mattfeldt | 1969 | CDU | Lower Saxony | Osterholz – Verden | 39.2 % | |
| | Hilde Mattheis | 1954 | SPD | Baden-Württemberg | | | |
| | Stephan Mayer | 1973 | CSU | Bavaria | Altötting | 54.5 % | |
| | Pascal Meiser | 1975 | The Left | Berlin | | | |
| | Michael Meister | 1961 | CDU | Hesse | Bergstraße | 38.9 % | |
| | Angela Merkel | 1954 | CDU | Mecklenburg-Vorpommern | Vorpommern-Rügen – Vorpommern-Greifswald I | 44.0 % | |
| | Jan Metzler | 1981 | CDU | Rhineland-Palatinate | Worms | 41.1 % | |
| | Christoph Meyer | 1975 | FDP | Berlin | | | |
| | Corinna Miazga | 1983 | AfD | Bavaria | | | |
| | Hans Michelbach | 1949 | CSU | Bavaria | Coburg | 45.3 % | |
| | Mathias Middelberg | 1964 | CDU | Lower Saxony | Stadt Osnabrück | 40.3 % | |
| | Matthias Miersch | 1968 | SPD | Lower Saxony | Hannover-Land II | 37.0 % | |
| | Mario Mieruch | 1975 | LKR (ex AfD) | North Rhine-Westphalia | | | Was elected on the AfD list, left party and parliamentary group on 4 October 2017. |
| | Irene Mihalic | 1976 | Greens | North Rhine-Westphalia | | | |
| | Klaus Mindrup | 1964 | SPD | Berlin | | | |
| | Susanne Mittag | 1958 | SPD | Lower Saxony | | | |
| | Amira Mohamed Ali | 1980 | The Left | Lower Saxony | | | |
| | Cornelia Möhring | 1960 | The Left | Schleswig-Holstein | | | |
| | Falko Mohrs | 1984 | SPD | Lower Saxony | Helmstedt – Wolfsburg | 38.0 % | |
| | Claudia Moll | 1968 | SPD | North Rhine-Westphalia | Aachen II | 36.9 % | |
| | Siemtje Möller | 1983 | SPD | Lower Saxony | Friesland – Wilhelmshaven – Wittmund | 39.7 % | |
| | Dietrich Monstadt | 1957 | CDU | Mecklenburg-Vorpommern | Schwerin – Ludwigslust-Parchim I – Nordwestmecklenburg I | 32.1 % | |
| | Karsten Möring | 1949 | CDU | North Rhine-Westphalia | Cologne I | 31.6 % | |
| | Elisabeth Motschmann | 1952 | CDU | Bremen | | | |
| | Niema Movassat | 1984 | The Left | North Rhine-Westphalia | | | |
| | Andreas Mrosek | 1958 | AfD | Saxony-Anhalt | | | |
| | Alexander Müller | 1969 | FDP | Hesse | | | |
| | Axel Müller | 1963 | CDU | Baden-Württemberg | Ravensburg | 38.5 % | |
| | Bettina Müller | 1959 | SPD | Hesse | | | |
| | Carsten Müller | 1970 | CDU | Lower Saxony | | | |
| | Claudia Müller | 1981 | Greens | Mecklenburg-Vorpommern | | | |
| | Detlef Müller | 1964 | SPD | Saxony | | | |
| | Gerd Müller | 1955 | CSU | Bavaria | Oberallgäu | 50.4 % | |
| | Hansjörg Müller | 1968 | AfD | Bavaria | | | |
| | Norbert Müller | 1986 | The Left | Brandenburg | | | |
| | Sepp Müller | 1989 | CDU | Saxony-Anhalt | Dessau – Wittenberg | 35.2 % | |
| | Stefan Müller | 1975 | CSU | Bavaria | Erlangen | 42.7 % | |
| | Roman Müller-Böhm | 1992 | FDP | North Rhine-Westphalia | | | |
| | Beate Müller-Gemmeke | 1960 | Greens | Baden-Württemberg | | | |
| | Frank Müller-Rosentritt | 1982 | FDP | Saxony | | | |
| | Michelle Müntefering | 1980 | SPD | North Rhine-Westphalia | Herne – Bochum II | 41.8 % | |
| | Volker Münz | 1964 | AfD | Baden-Württemberg | | | |
| | Sebastian Münzenmaier | 1989 | AfD | Rhineland-Palatinate | | | |
| | Rolf Mützenich | 1959 | SPD | North Rhine-Westphalia | Cologne III | 32.3 % | |
| | Zaklin Nastic | 1980 | The Left | Hamburg | | | |
| | Ingrid Nestle | 1977 | Greens | Schleswig-Holstein | | | |
| | Alexander Neu | 1969 | The Left | North Rhine-Westphalia | | | |
| | Christoph Neumann | 1964 | AfD | Saxony | | | |
| | Martin Neumann | 1956 | FDP | Brandenburg | | | |
| | Andreas Nick | 1967 | CDU | Rhineland-Palatinate | Montabaur | 43.3 % | |
| | Petra Nicolaisen | 1965 | CDU | Schleswig-Holstein | Flensburg – Schleswig | 40.0 % | |
| | Dietmar Nietan | 1964 | SPD | North Rhine-Westphalia | | | |
| | Ulli Nissen | 1959 | SPD | Hesse | | | |
| | Matthias Nölke | 1980 | FDP | Hesse | | | Replaced Stefan Ruppert on 28 April 2020 |
| | Michaela Noll | 1959 | CDU | North Rhine-Westphalia | Mettmann I | 44.6 % | |
| | Jan Nolte | 1988 | AfD | Hesse | | | |
| | Thomas Nord | 1957 | The Left | Brandenburg | | | |
| | Kristina Nordt | 1982 | CDU | Thuringia | | | Replaced Mark Hauptmann on 22 March 2021. |
| | Konstantin von Notz | 1971 | Greens | Schleswig-Holstein | | | |
| | Omid Nouripour | 1975 | Greens | Hesse | | | |
| | Georg Nüßlein | 1969 | CSU | Bavaria | Neu-Ulm | 44.6 % | |
| | Ulrich Oehme | 1960 | AfD | Saxony | | | |
| | Wilfried Oellers | 1975 | CDU | North Rhine-Westphalia | Heinsberg | 45.6 % | |
| | Thomas Oppermann | 1954 | SPD | Lower Saxony | Göttingen | 34.9 % | |
| | Josephine Ortleb | 1986 | SPD | Saarland | Saarbrücken | 32.1 % | |
| | Florian Oßner | 1980 | CSU | Bavaria | Landshut | 39.6 % | |
| | Friedrich Ostendorff | 1953 | Greens | North Rhine-Westphalia | | | |
| | Josef Oster | 1971 | CDU | Rhineland-Palatinate | Koblenz | 41.3 % | |
| | Henning Otte | 1968 | CDU | Lower Saxony | Celle – Uelzen | 42.7 % | |
| | Gerold Otten | 1955 | AfD | Bavaria | | | |
| | Cem Özdemir | 1965 | Greens | Baden-Württemberg | | | |
| | Mahmut Özdemir | 1987 | SPD | North Rhine-Westphalia | Duisburg II | 34.7 % | |
| | Aydan Özoğuz | 1967 | SPD | Hamburg | Hamburg-Wandsbek | 34.6 % | |
| | Ingrid Pahlmann | 1957 | CDU | Lower Saxony | | | Replaced Ursula von der Leyen on 1 August 2019. |
| | Sylvia Pantel | 1961 | CDU | North Rhine-Westphalia | Düsseldorf II | 33.8 % | |
| | Markus Paschke | 1973 | SPD | Lower Saxony | | | Replaced Sigmar Gabriel, 4 November 2019. |
| | Frank Pasemann | 1960 | AfD | Saxony-Anhalt | | | |
| | Martin Patzelt | 1947 | CDU | Brandenburg | Frankfurt (Oder) – Oder-Spree | 27.1 % | |
| | Petra Pau | 1963 | The Left | Berlin | Berlin-Marzahn-Hellersdorf | 34.2 % | |
| | Lisa Paus | 1968 | Greens | Berlin | | | |
| | Sören Pellmann | 1977 | The Left | Saxony | Leipzig II | 25.3 % | |
| | Victor Perli | 1982 | The Left | Lower Saxony | | | |
| | Tobias Peterka | 1982 | AfD | Bavaria | | | |
| | Christian Petry | 1965 | SPD | Saarland | | | |
| | Frauke Petry | 1975 | Independent (ex AfD) | Saxony | Sächsische Schweiz – Osterzgebirge | 37.4 % | Directly elected as AfD candidate; did not join AfD parliamentary group |
| | Joachim Pfeiffer | 1967 | CDU | Baden-Württemberg | Waiblingen | 36.8 % | |
| | Tobias Pflüger | 1965 | The Left | Baden-Württemberg | | | |
| | Detlev Pilger | 1955 | SPD | Rhineland-Palatinate | | | |
| | Stephan Pilsinger | 1987 | CSU | Bavaria | München-West/Mitte | 33.3 % | |
| | Christoph Ploß | 1985 | CDU | Hamburg | Hamburg-Nord | 33.5 % | |
| | Paul Podolay | 1946 | AfD | Bavaria | | | |
| | Jürgen Pohl | 1964 | AfD | Thuringia | | | |
| | Filiz Polat | 1978 | Greens | Lower Saxony | | | |
| | Eckhard Pols | 1962 | CDU | Lower Saxony | Lüchow-Dannenberg – Lüneburg | 33.5 % | |
| | Sabine Poschmann | 1968 | SPD | North Rhine-Westphalia | Dortmund II | 38.8 % | |
| | Achim Post | 1959 | SPD | North Rhine-Westphalia | Minden-Lübbecke I | 37.4 % | |
| | Florian Post | 1981 | SPD | Bavaria | | | |
| | Florian Pronold | 1972 | SPD | Bavaria | | | |
| | Stephan Protschka | 1977 | AfD | Bavaria | | | |
| | Sascha Raabe | 1968 | SPD | Hesse | | | |
| | Martin Rabanus | 1971 | SPD | Hesse | | | |
| | Thomas Rachel | 1962 | CDU | North Rhine-Westphalia | Düren | 41.9 % | |
| | Kerstin Radomski | 1974 | CDU | North Rhine-Westphalia | Krefeld II – Wesel II | 37.0 % | |
| | Alexander Radwan | 1964 | CSU | Bavaria | Bad Tölz-Wolfratshausen – Miesbach | 47.6 % | |
| | Alois Rainer | 1965 | CSU | Bavaria | Straubing | 47.6 % | |
| | Peter Ramsauer | 1954 | CSU | Bavaria | Traunstein | 50.3 % | |
| | Mechthild Rawert | 1957 | SPD | Berlin | | | Replaced Eva Högl on 26 May 2020 |
| | Eckhardt Rehberg | 1954 | CDU | Mecklenburg-Vorpommern | Mecklenburgische Seenplatte II – Landkreis Rostock III | 37.6 % | |
| | Martin Reichardt | 1969 | AfD | Saxony-Anhalt | | | |
| alternativtext= | Hagen Reinhold | 1978 | FDP | Mecklenburg-Vorpommern | | | |
| | Ingrid Remmers | 1965 | The Left | North Rhine-Westphalia | | | |
| | Martin Renner | 1954 | AfD | North Rhine-Westphalia | | | |
| | Martina Renner | 1967 | The Left | Thuringia | | | |
| | Roman Reusch | 1954 | AfD | Brandenburg | | | |
| | Bernd Reuther | 1971 | FDP | North Rhine-Westphalia | | | |
| | Daniela De Ridder | 1962 | SPD | Lower Saxony | | | |
| | Lothar Riebsamen | 1957 | CDU | Baden-Württemberg | Bodensee | 41.4 % | |
| | Josef Rief | 1960 | CDU | Baden-Württemberg | Biberach | 44.5 % | |
| | Bernd Riexinger | 1955 | The Left | Baden-Württemberg | | | |
| | Andreas Rimkus | 1962 | SPD | North Rhine-Westphalia | | | |
| | Sönke Rix | 1975 | SPD | Schleswig-Holstein | | | |
| | Dennis Rohde | 1986 | SPD | Lower Saxony | Oldenburg – Ammerland | 36.3 % | |
| | Johannes Röring | 1959 | CDU | North Rhine-Westphalia | Borken II | 52.3 % | |
| | Martin Rosemann | 1976 | SPD | Baden-Württemberg | | | |
| | René Röspel | 1964 | SPD | North Rhine-Westphalia | Hagen – Ennepe-Ruhr-Kreis I | 39.2 % | |
| | Ernst Dieter Rossmann | 1951 | SPD | Schleswig-Holstein | | | |
| | Tabea Rößner | 1966 | Greens | Rhineland-Palatinate | | | |
| | Claudia Roth | 1955 | Greens | Bavaria | | | |
| | Michael Roth | 1970 | SPD | Hesse | Werra-Meißner – Hersfeld-Rotenburg | 41.2 % | |
| | Norbert Röttgen | 1965 | CDU | North Rhine-Westphalia | Rhein-Sieg-Kreis II | 46.5 % | |
| | Manuela Rottmann | 1972 | Greens | Bavaria | | | |
| | Stefan Rouenhoff | 1978 | CDU | North Rhine-Westphalia | Kleve | 45.0 % | |
| | Erwin Rüddel | 1955 | CDU | Rhineland-Palatinate | Neuwied | 43.2 % | |
| | Corinna Rüffer | 1975 | Greens | Rhineland-Palatinate | | | |
| | Albert Rupprecht | 1968 | CSU | Bavaria | Weiden | 46.3 % | |
| | Susann Rüthrich | 1977 | SPD | Saxony | | | |
| | Bernd Rützel | 1968 | SPD | Bavaria | | | |
| | Sarah Ryglewski | 1983 | SPD | Bremen | Bremen I | 30.0 % | |
| | Johann Saathoff | 1967 | SPD | Lower Saxony | Aurich – Emden | 49.6 % | |
| | Manuel Sarrazin | 1982 | Greens | Hamburg | | | |
| | Thomas Sattelberger | 1949 | FDP | Bavaria | | | |
| | Stefan Sauer | 1966 | CDU | Hesse | Groß-Gerau | 35.1 % | |
| | Christian Sauter | 1980 | FDP | North Rhine-Westphalia | | | |
| | Anita Schäfer | 1951 | CDU | Rhineland-Palatinate | Pirmasens | 36.8 % | |
| | Axel Schäfer | 1952 | SPD | North Rhine-Westphalia | Bochum I | 37.2 % | |
| | Frank Schäffler | 1968 | FDP | North Rhine-Westphalia | | | |
| | Wolfgang Schäuble | 1942 | CDU | Baden-Württemberg | Offenburg | 48.1 % | |
| | Ulle Schauws | 1966 | Greens | North Rhine-Westphalia | | | |
| | Nina Scheer | 1971 | SPD | Schleswig-Holstein | | | |
| | Andreas Scheuer | 1974 | CSU | Bavaria | Passau | 47.5 % | |
| | Marianne Schieder | 1962 | SPD | Bavaria | | | |
| | Udo Schiefner | 1959 | SPD | North Rhine-Westphalia | | | |
| | Ulrike Schielke-Ziesing | 1969 | AfD | Mecklenburg-Vorpommern | | | |
| | Jana Schimke | 1979 | CDU | Brandenburg | Dahme-Spreewald – Teltow-Fläming III – Oberspreewald-Lausitz I | 30.7 % | |
| | Wieland Schinnenburg | 1958 | FDP | Hamburg | | | |
| | Tankred Schipanski | 1976 | CDU | Thuringia | Gotha – Ilm-Kreis | 29.0 % | |
| | Robby Schlund | 1967 | AfD | Thuringia | | | |
| | Nils Schmid | 1973 | SPD | Baden-Württemberg | | | |
| | Christian Schmidt | 1957 | CSU | Bavaria | Fürth | 39.9 % | |
| | Dagmar Schmidt | 1973 | SPD | Hesse | | | |
| | Frithjof Schmidt | 1953 | Greens | North Rhine-Westphalia | | | |
| | Stefan Schmidt | 1981 | Greens | Bavaria | | | |
| | Ulla Schmidt | 1949 | SPD | North Rhine-Westphalia | | | |
| | Uwe Schmidt | 1966 | SPD | Bremen | Bremen II – Bremerhaven | 34.0 % | |
| | Claudia Schmidtke | 1966 | CDU | Schleswig-Holstein | Lübeck | 35.3 % | |
| | Carsten Schneider | 1976 | SPD | Thuringia | | | |
| | Jörg Schneider | 1964 | AfD | North Rhine-Westphalia | | | |
| | Charlotte Schneidewind-Hartnagel | 1953 | Greens | Baden-Württemberg | | | Replaced Kerstin Andreae on 1 November 2019. |
| | Patrick Schnieder | 1968 | CDU | Rhineland-Palatinate | Bitburg | 51.2 % | |
| | Nadine Schön | 1983 | CDU | Saarland | St. Wendel (electoral district) | 41.8 % | |
| | Johannes Schraps | 1983 | SPD | Lower Saxony | Hameln-Pyrmont – Holzminden | 39.1 % | |
| | Eva Schreiber | 1958 | The Left | Bavaria | | | |
| | Felix Schreiner | 1986 | CDU | Baden-Württemberg | Waldshut | 41.9 % | |
| | Michael Schrodi | 1977 | SPD | Bavaria | | | |
| | Ursula Schulte | 1952 | SPD | North Rhine-Westphalia | | | |
| | Martin Schulz | 1955 | SPD | North Rhine-Westphalia | | | |
| | Swen Schulz | 1968 | SPD | Berlin | Berlin-Spandau – Charlottenburg North | 32.1 % | |
| | Uwe Schulz | 1961 | AfD | Hesse | | | |
| | Kordula Schulz-Asche | 1956 | Greens | Hesse | | | |
| | Klaus-Peter Schulze | 1954 | CDU | Brandenburg | Cottbus – Spree-Neiße | 28.4 % | |
| | Uwe Schummer | 1957 | CDU | North Rhine-Westphalia | Viersen | 47.9 % | |
| | Armin Schuster | 1961 | CDU | Baden-Württemberg | Lörrach – Müllheim | 39.4 % | |
| | Frank Schwabe | 1970 | SPD | North Rhine-Westphalia | Recklinghausen I | 38.7 % | |
| | Stefan Schwartze | 1974 | SPD | North Rhine-Westphalia | Herford – Minden-Lübbecke II | 36.7 % | |
| | Andreas Schwarz | 1965 | SPD | Bavaria | | | |
| | Rita Schwarzelühr-Sutter | 1962 | SPD | Baden-Württemberg | | | |
| | Torsten Schweiger | 1968 | CDU | Saxony-Anhalt | Mansfeld | 31.0 % | |
| | Matthias Seestern-Pauly | 1984 | FDP | Lower Saxony | | | |
| | Detlef Seif | 1962 | CDU | North Rhine-Westphalia | Euskirchen – Rhein-Erft-Kreis II | 42.8 % | |
| | Thomas Seitz | 1967 | AfD | Baden-Württemberg | | | |
| | Johannes Selle | 1956 | CDU | Thuringia | Jena – Sömmerda – Weimarer Land I | 29.2 % | |
| | Reinhold Sendker | 1952 | CDU | North Rhine-Westphalia | Warendorf | 46.4 % | |
| | Patrick Sensburg | 1971 | CDU | North Rhine-Westphalia | Hochsauerlandkreis | 48.0 % | |
| | Martin Sichert | 1980 | AfD | Bavaria | | | |
| | Bernd Siebert | 1949 | CDU | Hesse | | | Replaced Oswin Veith on 2 March 2020 |
| | Thomas Silberhorn | 1968 | CSU | Bavaria | Bamberg | 42.1 % | |
| | Björn Simon | 1981 | CDU | Hesse | Offenbach | 36.4 % | |
| | Frank Sitta | 1978 | FDP | Saxony-Anhalt | | | |
| | Petra Sitte | 1960 | The Left | Saxony-Anhalt | | | |
| | Judith Skudelny | 1975 | FDP | Baden-Württemberg | | | |
| | Hermann Otto Solms | 1940 | FDP | Hesse | | | |
| | Evrim Sommer | 1971 | The Left | Berlin | | | |
| | Tino Sorge | 1975 | CDU | Saxony-Anhalt | Magdeburg | 27.4 % | |
| | Jens Spahn | 1980 | CDU | North Rhine-Westphalia | Steinfurt I – Borken I | 51.3 % | |
| | Detlev Spangenberg | 1944 | AfD | Saxony | | | |
| | Dirk Spaniel | 1971 | AfD | Baden-Württemberg | | | |
| | Rainer Spiering | 1956 | SPD | Lower Saxony | | | |
| | René Springer | 1979 | AfD | Brandenburg | | | |
| | Svenja Stadler | 1976 | SPD | Lower Saxony | | | |
| | Katrin Staffler | 1981 | CSU | Bavaria | Fürstenfeldbruck | 43.6 % | |
| | Martina Stamm-Fibich | 1965 | SPD | Bavaria | | | |
| | Bettina Stark-Watzinger | 1968 | FDP | Hesse | | | |
| | Frank Steffel | 1966 | CDU | Berlin | Berlin-Reinickendorf | 36.8 % | |
| | Sonja Steffen | 1963 | SPD | Mecklenburg-Vorpommern | | | |
| | Wolfgang Stefinger | 1985 | CSU | Bavaria | Munich East | 36.8 % | |
| | Albert Stegemann | 1976 | CDU | Lower Saxony | Mittelems | 53.6 % | |
| | Andreas Steier | 1972 | CDU | Rhineland-Palatinate | Trier | 37.9 % | |
| | Mathias Stein | 1970 | SPD | Schleswig-Holstein | Kiel | 31.0 % | |
| | Peter Stein | 1968 | CDU | Mecklenburg-Vorpommern | Rostock – Landkreis Rostock II | 29.5 % | |
| | Sebastian Steineke | 1973 | CDU | Brandenburg | Prignitz – Ostprignitz-Ruppin – Havelland I | 30.8 % | |
| | Johannes Steiniger | 1987 | CDU | Rhineland-Palatinate | Neustadt – Speyer | 40.0 % | |
| | Kersten Steinke | 1958 | The Left | Thuringia | | | |
| | Christian von Stetten | 1970 | CDU | Baden-Württemberg | Schwäbisch Hall – Hohenlohe | 40.5 % | |
| | Dieter Stier | 1964 | CDU | Saxony-Anhalt | Burgenland – Saalekreis | 33.6 % | |
| | Beatrix von Storch | 1971 | AfD | Berlin | | | |
| | Gero Storjohann | 1958 | CDU | Schleswig-Holstein | Segeberg – Stormarn-Mitte | 41.1 % | |
| | Stephan Stracke | 1974 | CSU | Bavaria | Ostallgäu | 49.2 % | |
| | Marie-Agnes Strack-Zimmermann | 1958 | FDP | North Rhine-Westphalia | | | |
| | Friedrich Straetmanns | 1961 | The Left | North Rhine-Westphalia | | | |
| | Benjamin Strasser | 1987 | FDP | Baden-Württemberg | | | |
| | Max Straubinger | 1954 | CSU | Bavaria | Rottal-Inn | 45.0 % | |
| | Wolfgang Strengmann-Kuhn | 1964 | Greens | Hesse | | | |
| | Karin Strenz | 1967 | CDU | Mecklenburg-Vorpommern | Ludwigslust-Parchim II – Nordwestmecklenburg II – Landkreis Rostock I | 30.0 % | |
| | Margit Stumpp | 1963 | Greens | Baden-Württemberg | | | |
| | Katja Suding | 1975 | FDP | Hamburg | | | |
| | Kerstin Tack | 1968 | SPD | Lower Saxony | Stadt Hannover I | 35.6 % | |
| | Kirsten Tackmann | 1960 | The Left | Brandenburg | | | |
| | Jessica Tatti | 1981 | The Left | Baden-Württemberg | | | |
| | Peter Tauber | 1974 | CDU | Hesse | Main-Kinzig – Wetterau II – Schotten | 36.4 % | |
| | Claudia Tausend | 1964 | SPD | Bavaria | | | |
| | Hermann-Josef Tebroke | 1964 | CDU | North Rhine-Westphalia | Rheinisch-Bergischer Kreis | 40.0 % | |
| | Linda Teuteberg | 1981 | FDP | Brandenburg | | | |
| | Michael Theurer | 1967 | FDP | Baden-Württemberg | | | |
| | Michael Thews | 1964 | SPD | North Rhine-Westphalia | Hamm – Unna II | 36.4 % | |
| | Hans-Jürgen Thies | 1955 | CDU | North Rhine-Westphalia | Soest | 42.7 % | |
| | Stephan Thomae | 1968 | FDP | Bavaria | | | |
| | Alexander Throm | 1968 | CDU | Baden-Württemberg | Heilbronn | 35.3 % | |
| | Dietlind Tiemann | 1955 | CDU | Brandenburg | Brandenburg an der Havel – Potsdam-Mittelmark I – Havelland III – Teltow-Fläming I | 31.8 % | |
| | Antje Tillmann | 1964 | CDU | Thuringia | Erfurt – Weimar – Weimarer Land II | 27.3 % | |
| | Manfred Todtenhausen | 1950 | FDP | North Rhine-Westphalia | | | |
| | Florian Toncar | 1979 | FDP | Baden-Württemberg | | | |
| | Markus Töns | 1964 | SPD | North Rhine-Westphalia | Gelsenkirchen | 38.3 % | |
| | Carsten Träger | 1973 | SPD | Bavaria | | | Replaced Ewald Schurer on 6 December 2017 |
| | Markus Tressel | 1977 | Greens | Saarland | | | |
| | Jürgen Trittin | 1954 | Greens | Lower Saxony | | | |
| | Markus Uhl | 1979 | CDU | Saarland | Homburg | 33.6 % | |
| | Andrew Ullmann | 1963 | FDP | Bavaria | | | |
| | Gerald Ullrich | 1962 | FDP | Thuringia | | | |
| | Volker Ullrich | 1975 | CSU | Bavaria | Augsburg-Stadt | 34.8 % | |
| | Alexander Ulrich | 1971 | The Left | Rhineland-Palatinate | | | |
| | Arnold Vaatz | 1955 | CDU | Saxony | Dresden II – Bautzen II | 25.5 % | |
| | Julia Verlinden | 1979 | Greens | Lower Saxony | | | |
| | Kerstin Vieregge | 1976 | CDU | North Rhine-Westphalia | Lippe I | 36.6 % | |
| | Johannes Vogel | 1982 | FDP | North Rhine-Westphalia | | | |
| | Volkmar Vogel | 1959 | CDU | Thuringia | Gera – Greiz – Altenburger Land | 30.4 % | |
| | Kathrin Vogler | 1963 | The Left | North Rhine-Westphalia | | | |
| | Ute Vogt | 1964 | SPD | Baden-Württemberg | | | |
| | Marja-Liisa Völlers | 1984 | SPD | Lower Saxony | | | Replaced Carola Reimann on 23 November 2017 |
| | Dirk Vöpel | 1971 | SPD | North Rhine-Westphalia | Oberhausen – Wesel III | 38.5 % | |
| | Christoph de Vries | 1974 | CDU | Hamburg | | | |
| | Kees de Vries | 1955 | CDU | Saxony-Anhalt | Anhalt | 31.6 % | |
| | Johann Wadephul | 1963 | CDU | Schleswig-Holstein | Rendsburg-Eckernförde | 42.7 % | |
| | Sahra Wagenknecht | 1969 | The Left | North Rhine-Westphalia | | | |
| | Andreas Wagner (politician) | 1972 | The Left | Bavaria | | | |
| | Daniela Wagner | 1957 | Greens | Hesse | | | |
| | Beate Walter-Rosenheimer | 1964 | Greens | Bavaria | | | |
| | Marco Wanderwitz | 1975 | CDU | Saxony | Chemnitzer Umland – Erzgebirgskreis II | 35.1 % | |
| | Nina Warken | 1979 | CDU | Baden-Württemberg | | | Replaced Stephan Harbarth on 5 December 2018 |
| | Gabi Weber | 1955 | SPD | Rhineland-Palatinate | | | |
| | Sandra Weeser | 1969 | FDP | Rhineland-Palatinate | | | |
| | Kai Wegner | 1972 | CDU | Berlin | | | |
| | Alice Weidel | 1979 | AfD | Baden-Württemberg | | | |
| | Albert Weiler | 1965 | CDU | Thuringia | Saalfeld-Rudolstadt – Saale-Holzland-Kreis – Saale-Orla-Kreis | 30.9 % | |
| | Harald Weinberg | 1957 | The Left | Bavaria | | | |
| | Marcus Weinberg | 1967 | CDU | Hamburg | | | |
| | Joe Weingarten | 1962 | SPD | Rhineland-Palatinate | | | Replaced Andrea Nahles, 1 November 2019. |
| | Anja Weisgerber | 1976 | CSU | Bavaria | Schweinfurt | 47.9 % | |
| | Peter Weiß | 1956 | CDU | Baden-Württemberg | Emmendingen – Lahr | 37.6 % | |
| | Sabine Weiss | 1958 | CDU | North Rhine-Westphalia | Wesel I | 39.0 % | |
| | Ingo Wellenreuther | 1959 | CDU | Baden-Württemberg | Karlsruhe-Stadt | 28.5 % | |
| | Marian Wendt | 1985 | CDU | Saxony | Nordsachsen | 32.8 % | |
| | Katrin Werner | 1973 | The Left | Rhineland-Palatinate | | | |
| | Nicole Westig | 1967 | FDP | North Rhine-Westphalia | | | |
| | Bernd Westphal | 1960 | SPD | Lower Saxony | Hildesheim | 37.2 % | |
| | Harald Weyel | 1959 | AfD | North Rhine-Westphalia | | | |
| | Kai Whittaker | 1985 | CDU | Baden-Württemberg | Rastatt | 44.1 % | |
| | Annette Widmann-Mauz | 1966 | CDU | Baden-Württemberg | Tübingen | 35.7 % | |
| | Wolfgang Wiehle | 1964 | AfD | Bavaria | | | |
| | Dirk Wiese | 1983 | SPD | North Rhine-Westphalia | | | |
| | Bettina Wiesmann | 1966 | CDU | Hesse | Frankfurt am Main II | 32.4 % | |
| | Heiko Wildberg | 1952 | AfD | Rhineland-Palatinate | | | |
| | Katharina Willkomm | 1987 | FDP | North Rhine-Westphalia | | | |
| | Klaus-Peter Willsch | 1961 | CDU | Hesse | Rheingau-Taunus – Limburg | 41.8 % | |
| | Elisabeth Winkelmeier-Becker | 1962 | CDU | North Rhine-Westphalia | Rhein-Sieg-Kreis I | 44.3 % | |
| | Christian Wirth | 1963 | AfD | Saarland | | | |
| | Uwe Witt | 1959 | AfD | North Rhine-Westphalia | | | |
| | Oliver Wittke | 1966 | CDU | North Rhine-Westphalia | | | |
| | Gülistan Yüksel | 1962 | SPD | North Rhine-Westphalia | | | |
| | Hubertus Zdebel | 1954 | The Left | North Rhine-Westphalia | | | |
| | Tobias Zech | 1981 | CSU | Bavaria | | | Replaced Astrid Freudenstein, 25 May 2020 |
| | Emmi Zeulner | 1987 | CSU | Bavaria | Kulmbach | 55.4 % | |
| | Gerhard Zickenheiner | 1961 | Greens | Baden-Württemberg | | | Replaced Gerhard Schick, 1 January 2019 |
| | Dagmar Ziegler | 1960 | SPD | Brandenburg | | | |
| | Paul Ziemiak | 1985 | CDU | North Rhine-Westphalia | | | |
| | Stefan Zierke | 1970 | SPD | Brandenburg | | | |
| | Matthias Zimmer | 1961 | CDU | Hesse | Frankfurt am Main I | 30.5 % | |
| | Jens Zimmermann | 1981 | SPD | Hesse | | | |
| | Pia Zimmermann | 1956 | The Left | Lower Saxony | | | |
| | Sabine Zimmermann | 1960 | The Left | Saxony | | | |

== Former members ==
Several members have resigned or died in office.

| Image | Name | Year of birth | Party | State | Constituency (for directly elected members) | Constituency vote percentage (if applicable) | Remarks |
|---|---|---|---|---|---|---|---|
| | Kerstin Andreae | 1968 | Greens | Baden-Württemberg | | | Resigned on 31 October 2019, replaced by Charlotte Schneidewind-Hartnagel |
| | Katarina Barley | 1968 | SPD | Rhineland-Palatinate | | | Resigned on 1 July 2019 to become a member of the European Parliament, replaced by Isabel Mackensen-Geis. |
| | Danyal Bayaz | 1983 | Greens | Baden-Württemberg | | | Resigned on 28 May 2021 to become minister of finance in Baden-Württemberg, replaced by Marcel Emmerich |
| | Nicola Beer | 1970 | FDP | Hesse | | | Resigned on 30 June 2019 to become a member of the European Parliament, replaced by Peter Heidt. |
| | Ralf Brauksiepe | 1967 | CDU | North Rhine-Westphalia | | | Resigned on 4 November 2018, left politics. Replaced by Gisela Manderla. |
| | Bernd Klaus Buchholz | 1961 | FDP | Schleswig-Holstein | | | Became minister of economy in Schleswig-Holstein, did not take his seat in parliament. Replaced by Gyde Jensen on 25 September 2017. |
| | Martin Burkert | 1964 | SPD | Bavaria | | | Resigned on 1 February 2020, replaced by Bela Bach |
| | Astrid Freudenstein | 1973 | CSU | Bavaria | | | Resigned on 15 May 2020, replaced by Tobias Zech |
| | Sigmar Gabriel | 1959 | SPD | Lower Saxony | Salzgitter – Wolfenbüttel | 42.8 % | Resigned on 3 November 2019, replaced by Markus Paschke |
| | Stephan Harbarth | 1971 | CDU | Baden-Württemberg | Rhein-Neckar | 37.4 % | Resigned on 30 November 2018 to become judge at the Bundesverfassungsgericht, replaced by Nina Warken. |
| | Mark Hauptmann | 1984 | CDU | Thuringia | Suhl – Schmalkalden-Meiningen – Hildburghausen – Sonneberg | 33.5 % | Resigned on 19 March 2021, replaced by Kristina Nordt |
| | Eva Högl | 1969 | SPD | Berlin | Berlin-Mitte | 23.5 % | Resigned on 25 May 2020 to become Parliamentary Commissioner for the Armed Forces, replaced by Mechthild Rawert |
| | Johannes Kahrs | 1963 | SPD | Hamburg | Hamburg-Mitte | 30.9 % | Resigned on 5 May 2020, replaced by Dorothee Martin |
| | Ulrich Kelber | 1968 | SPD | North Rhine-Westphalia | Bonn | 34.9 % | Resigned on 6 January 2019 to become Federal Commissioner for Data Protection and Freedom of Information, replaced by Nezahat Baradari. |
| | Thomas Kemmerich | 1965 | FDP | Thuringia | | | Resigned on 14 November 2019 to become chair of his party's group in the Landtag of Thuringia, replaced by Reginald Hanke. |
| | Ursula von der Leyen | 1958 | CDU | Lower Saxony | | | Resigned on 31 July 2019 to become President of the European Commission, replaced by Ingrid Pahlmann. |
| | Burkhard Lischka | 1965 | SPD | Saxony-Anhalt | | | Resigned on 14 October 2019, replaced by Eberhard Brecht |
| | Marlene Mortler | 1955 | CSU | Bavaria | Roth | 44.5 % | Resigned on 1 July 2019 to become a member of the European Parliament, replaced by Astrid Freudenstein. |
| | Andrea Nahles | 1970 | SPD | Rhineland-Palatinate | | | Resigned on 31 October 2019, replaced by Joe Weingarten. |
| | Carola Reimann | 1967 | SPD | Lower Saxony | Braunschweig | 38.0 % | Resigned on 21 November 2017 to become a minister in Lower Saxony, replaced by Marja-Liisa Völlers. |
| | Stefan Ruppert | 1971 | FDP | Hesse | | | Resigned on 27 April 2020, replaced by Matthias Nölke. |
| | Gerhard Schick | 1972 | Greens | Baden-Württemberg | | | Resigned on 31 December 2018, replaced by Gerhard Zickenheiner. |
| | Jimmy Schulz | 1968 | FDP | Bavaria | | | Died on 25 November 2019, replaced by Sandra Bubendorfer-Licht |
| | Manja Schüle | 1976 | SPD | Brandenburg | Potsdam – Potsdam-Mittelmark II – Teltow-Fläming II | 26.1 % | Resigned on 2 December 2019, replaced by Sylvia Lehmann |
| | Ewald Schurer | 1954 | SPD | Bayern | | | Died unexpectedly on 3 December 2017, replaced by Carsten Träger. |
| | Michael Stübgen | 1959 | CDU | Brandenburg | Elbe-Elster – Oberspreewald-Lausitz II | 29.5 % | Resigned on 2 December 2019, replaced by Saskia Ludwig. |
| | Oswin Veith | 1961 | CDU | Hesse | Wetterau I | 36.4 % | Resigned on 1 March 2020, replaced by Bernd Siebert |

== See also ==
- Politics of Germany
- List of Bundestag Members
