= Committee on Human Rights and Humanitarian Aid =

The Committee on Human Rights and Humanitarian Aid has been a permanent Bundestag committee since its establishment in 1998.

== Tasks ==
The Bundestag Committee is dedicated to human dignity and human rights. Its agenda includes correcting domestic violations, safeguarding human rights in the fight against international terrorism, prevention through humanitarian aid and working on national, European and international instruments for the protection of human rights. To this end, the committee regularly works together with non-governmental organisations. With the 'Parliamentarians Protect Parliamentarians' programme, Member of parliament support threatened parliamentarians and human rights defenders in other countries.

== Members in the 20th legislative period ==
The 19 members of the committee in the 20th legislative period consist of six members of the SPD parliamentary group, five members of the CDU/CSU parliamentary group, three members of the Green Party faction, two members each of the FDP parliamentary group and the AfD parliamentary group and one member of the Left Party parliamentary group.

The chairperson is FDP MP Renata Alt, her deputy is CDU MP Norbert Altenkamp.

SPD – full member	SPD – deputy member	CDU/CSU – full member	CDU/CSU – deputy member	Green Party faction – full member	Green Party faction – deputy member	FDP – full member	FDP – deputy member	AfD – full member	AfD – deputy member	Left Party – full member	Left Party – deputy member
Heike Engelhardt	Lars Castelucci	Knut Abraham	Sebastian Brehm	Max Luchs *	Misbah Khan	Renata Alt Chair	Alexander Graf Lambsdorff	Jürgen Braun */**	Dietmar Friedhoff	Żaklin Nastić */**	Ali Al-Dailami
Fabian Funke	Jan Dieren	Norbert Altenkamp Deputy Chair	Carsten Bodesser	Boris Mijatović **	Julian Pahlke	Peter Heidt */**	Ulrich Lechte	Martin Sichert	Frank Rinck		
Rainer Keller	Gabriela Heinrich	Michael Brand **	Franziska Hoppermann	Beate Walter- Rosenheimer	Kassem Taher Saleh						
Frank Schwabe *	Anke Hennig	Jonas Geisler	Patricia Lips								
Nadja Sthamer	Rasha Nasr	Sabine Weiss *	Elisabeth Winkelmeier-Becker								
Derya Türk-Nachbaur	Aydan Özoğuz										

- * Representatives
- ** Speaker

== Members in the 19th legislative period ==
The 17 members of the committee in the 19th legislative period consisted of six members of the CDU/CSU parliamentary group, three members of the SPD parliamentary group and two members each of the Left Party parliamentary group, the Bündnis 90/Die Grünen parliamentary group, the AfD parliamentary group and the FDP parliamentary group.

The chairperson was Gyde Jensen (FDP).

CDU/CSU – full member	CDU/CSU – deputy member	SPD – full member	SPD – deputy member	Left Party – full member	Left Party – deputy member	Green Party faction – full member	Green Party faction – deputy member	AfD – full member	AfD – deputy member	FDP – full member	FDP – deputy member
Norbert Altenkamp	Carsten Brodesser	Josephine Ortleb	Lars Castellucci	Michel Brandt *	Christine Buchholz	Margarete Bause */**	Luise Amtsberg	Jürgen Braun ***	Anton Friesen	Peter Heidt *	Lukas Köhler
Michael Brand **	Astrid Damerow	Aydan Özoğuz	Karamba Diaby	Żaklin Nastić **	Ulla Jelpke	Kai Gehring	Filiz Polat	Waldemar Herdt	Markus Frohnmaier	Gyde Jensen	Alexander Graf Lambsdorff
Sebastian Brehm	Michael Kuffer	Frank Schwabe */**	Gabriela Heinrich								
Frank Heinrich *	Katja Leikert										
Martin Patzelt	Elisabeth Motschmann										
Matthias Zimmer	Tankred Schipanski										

- * Representatives
- ** Speaker
- *** Deputy Chair

== Committee chairs ==
- 1998–2001 Claudia Roth (Green Party faction)
- 2001–2005 Christa Nickels (Green Party faction)
- 2005–2009 Herta Däubler-Gmelin (SPD)
- 2009–2013 Tom Koenigs (Green Party faction)
- 2013–2017 Michael Brand (CDU/CSU)
- 2017–2018 Matthias Zimmer (CDU/CSU)
- 2018–2021 Gyde Jensen (FDP)
- since 2021 Renata Alt (FDP)
