= Hebner =

Hebner is a surname. Notable people with the surname include:

- Dave Hebner (1949–2022), American professional wrestling authority figure, promoter, road agent and referee
- Earl Hebner (born 1949), professional wrestling referee currently working for Impact Wrestling, and the twin brother of Dave Hebner
- Harry Hebner (1891–1968), American backstroke and freestyle swimmer as well as a water polo player, who competed in the 1908, 1912 and 1920 Summer Olympics
- Martin Hebner (1959–2021), German politician
- Richie Hebner (born 1947), former third baseman in Major League Baseball who had an 18-year career from 1968 to 1985
