= Kristina Nordt =

German politician

Member of the Bundestag for Thuringia
- Incumbent
- Assumed office 22 March 2021
- Preceded by: Mark Hauptmann

Personal details
- Born: Kristina Scherer; 17 February 1982 (age 43); Kaiserslautern, Germany
- Political party: Christian Democratic Union
- Children: 1
- Education: University of Erfurt

Kristina Nordt (née Scherer; born 17 February 1982) is a German politician of the Christian Democratic Union (CDU) and political scientist. She was a member of the German Bundestag from March 2021 to October 2021.

== Early life and family ==
After graduating from the Edith Stein School in Erfurt in 2000, Nordt completed a bachelor's degree with a major in political science-social sciences and a minor in political science-legal studies at the then newly founded Faculty of Political Science at the University of Erfurt until 2003. She completed the subsequent master's degree in political science-social sciences in Erfurt with the Magister Artium. During her studies, she worked as a research assistant at the Chair of Sociology of Education at the University of Erfurt.

Nordt was an advisor at the Thuringian Ministry of Social Affairs, Family and Health from 2005 to 2007. She then worked as an advisor at the CDU parliamentary group in the Thuringian state parliament from 2008 to 2020 in the areas of education, youth and sports, and equality. Since 2021, Nordt has been employed by the Kolping-Bildungswerk Thüringen.

Kristina Nordt is married, has one child and lives in Erfurt.

Her father is the former Thuringian Minister of the Interior, President of the Thuringian Court of Audit and Member of the State Parliament Manfred Scherer.

== Political career ==
Nordt joined the Junge Union and the CDU in 2008. She was an assessor in JU state executive and deputy district chairwoman of the JU in Erfurt. From 2010 to 2016, she was a member of the federal board of the JU. There she was, among other things, university policy spokesperson for the youth association.

Nordt is deputy chairwoman of a local CDU association in Erfurt and has been a member of the Erfurt CDU district executive committee since 2011. She was a member of the CDU Germany's Federal Committee on Education, Research and Innovation from 2013 to 2017.

In the 2017 Bundestag election, Nordt ran for the German Bundestag in 6th place on the CDU state list for Thuringia. She has been in the Bundestag since March 22, 2021, as the successor to Mark Hauptmann, who renounced his membership in the Bundestag in March 2021. She is a member of the Committee on Economic Affairs and Energy. She is a deputy member of the Committee on Health and Committee on Foreign Affairs.

From 2009 to 2014, Nordt was a member of the Committee for Social Affairs, Labor Market and Equality of the City of Erfurt.
