= Beate Walter-Rosenheimer =

German politician (born 1964)

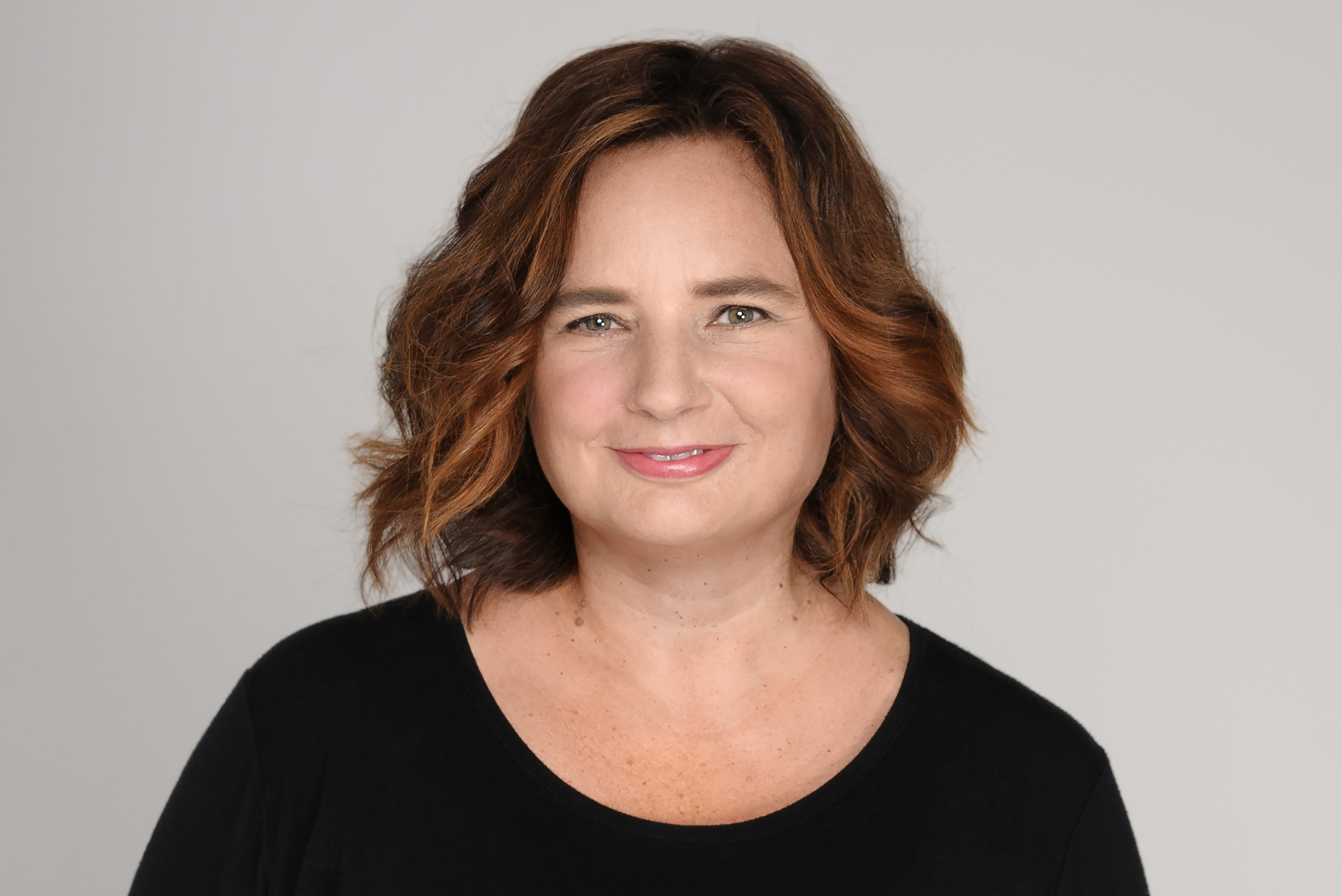
- Beate Walter-Rosenheimer in 2017

Member of the Bundestag
- In office 2012–2025

Personal details
- Born: 20 November 1964 (age 61) Weißenburg, West Germany (now Germany)
- Party: Greens
- Children: 5
- Education: LMU Munich

Beate Walter-Rosenheimer (born 20 November 1964) is a German politician of Alliance 90/The Greens who served as a member of the Bundestag from the state of Bavaria from 2012 to 2025. Prior to her political career, she worked as a freelance psychologist. In parliament, she has served on various committees and was her parliamentary group's spokesperson for youth policy, education, and training.

== Early life and career ==
Born in Weißenburg, Bavaria, Walter-Rosenheimer grew up in Ingolstadt and Munich, where she graduated from high school in 1985. She then studied communication sciences, philosophy, history and psychology at LMU Munich (Diplom-Psychologin).

Walter-Rosenheimer then worked as a freelance psychologist in the fields of industrial psychology, coaching and clinical psychology. From 2009 to 2011, she was a research assistant to Margarete Bause, the parliamentary party leader of the Greens in the State Parliament of Bavaria.

== Political career ==
On 16 January 2012, Walter-Rosenheimer moved up to the Bundestag.

In parliament, Walter-Rosenheimer served on the Committee on Education, Research and Technology Assessment (2013–2021); the Committee on Family, Senior Citizens, Women and Youth (2013–2021); the Committee on Human Rights and Humanitarian Aid (2021–2025); and the Committee on Petitions (2021–2025). She was also a member of the Enquete Commission on Vocational Training. From 2013 until 2021, she was her parliamentary group's spokesperson for youth policy, education and training.

In February 2024, Walter-Rosenheimer announced that she would not stand in the 2025 federal elections but instead resign from active politics by the end of the parliamentary term.

== Personal life ==
Walter-Rosenheimer has five children. She lives in Munich.
