= Misbah Khan (politician) =

German politician (born 1989)

Misbah Khan MdB
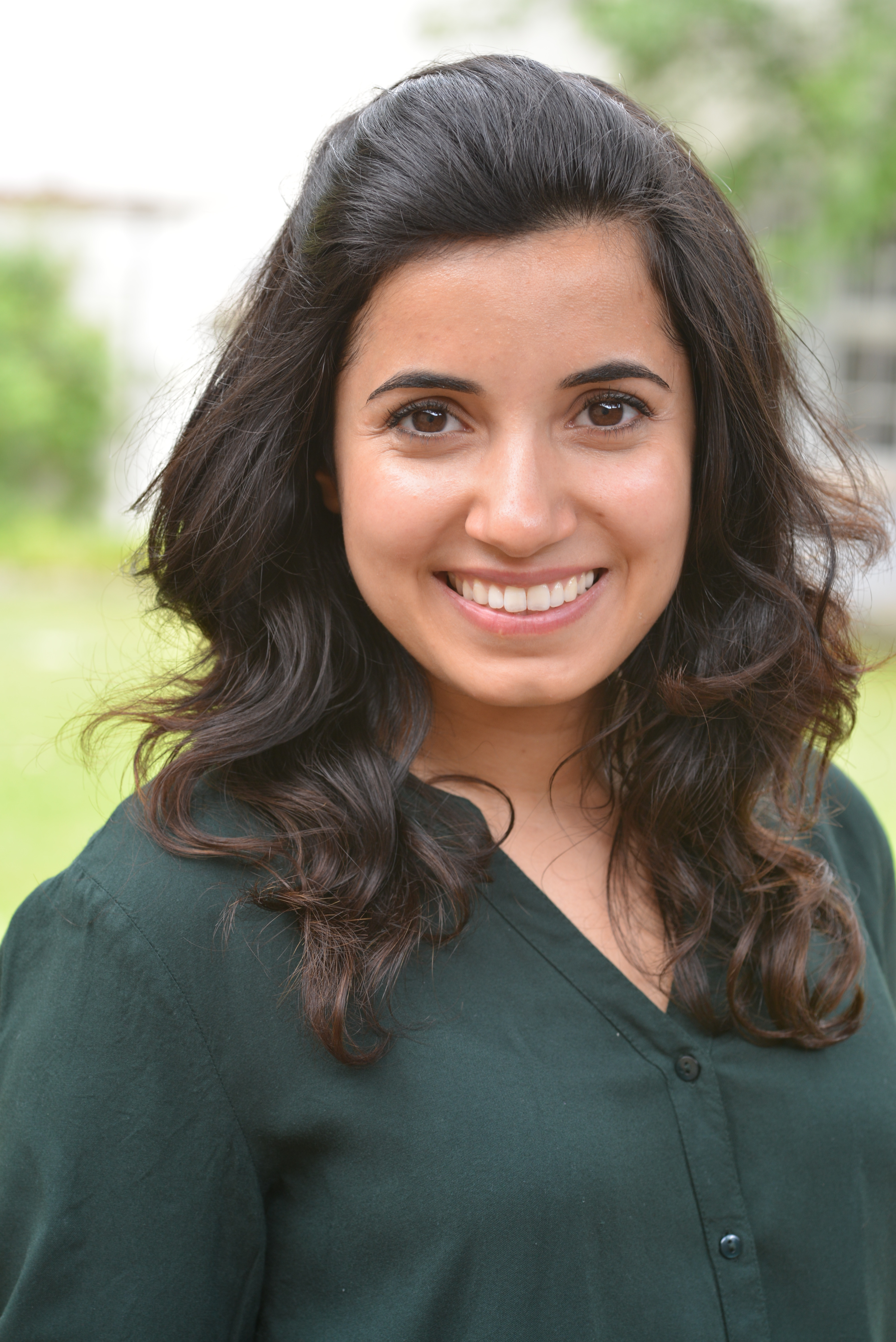
- Misbah Khan in 2016

Member of the Bundestag

Personal details
- Born: 4 December 1989 (age 36) Karachi, Pakistan
- Party: Alliance 90/The Greens Alliance 90/The Greens
- Education: Johannes Gutenberg University

Misbah Khan (born 4 December 1989 in Karachi, Pakistan) is a German politician of the Alliance 90/The Greens who has been serving as a member of the Bundestag since 2021. She was state chair of the Rhineland-Palatinate Green Party from November 2019 to March 2022.

== Early life and career ==
Khan was born 1989 in Karachi and has lived in Meckenheim since she was four years old. She graduated from the Kurfürst-Ruprecht-Gymnasium in Neustadt an der Weinstraße. Khan studied political science and British studies at Johannes Gutenberg University in Mainz. She worked for the Rhineland-Palatinate State Agency for Civic Education, and since 2017 she has worked for the Rhineland-Palatinate State Office for Social Affairs, Youth and Supply in the Democracy Center in the department of religious extremism.

== Political career ==
=== Early beginnings ===
Khan has been a member of the Green Party since 2008, and was a member of the Green Youth from 2009 to 2017. Khan was a member of the Deidesheim Municipal Council from 2009 to 2014, and which she rejoined again in 2019. From 2009 to 2011 and again from 2014 to 2016, Khan was a member of the state executive committee of the Green Youth of Rhineland-Palatinate. In the Bad Dürkheim district association, she was a member of the Green Party's district executive committee from 2010 to 2011 and again from 2012 to 2016. At the state level, she has been active as spokesperson for the state working group Peace & International Affairs since 2014.

Khan ran in the 2016 state election in Rhineland-Palatinate in 11th place on the state list and ran in the 2017 German federal election as a direct candidate in the Neustadt – Speyer constituency. At the state delegates' meeting in November 2019, Khan was elected state chair of the Rhineland-Palatinate Green Party.

=== Member of the German Parliament, 2021–present ===
In the 2021 German federal election, Khan ran in 5th place on the state list of the Greens of Rhineland-Palatinate and won a mandate in the Bundestag via the list position.

In parliament, Khan initially served as a full member of the Committee on Digital Affairs and the Committee on Home Affairs and a deputy member of the Committee on Human Rights and Humanitarian Aid. In this capacity, she was her parliamentary group's rapporteur on feminist digital policy, data protection and privacy rights.

Since the 2025 German federal election, Khan has been serving as deputy chair of the Green Party's parliamentary group, under the leadership of co-chairs Katharina Dröge and Britta Haßelmann. In this capacity, she oversees the group’s legislative activities on health, research and families. In the 21st Bundestag, Khan is a member of the committee for education, family, senior citizens, women and youth.
