= Frank Rinck =

German politician (born 1986)

Member of the Bundestag
- In office 2021 – March 2025

Personal details
- Born: 4 November 1986 (age 39) Stade
- Party: Alternative for Germany

Frank Rinck (born 4 November 1986 in Stade) is a German politician for the AfD. Rinck was born in West German town of Stade and entered the AfD in 2015.

Rinck was elected to the Bundestag in 2021.

He was not re-elected. In 2025 reporters found out that in November 2023 Rinck traveled to China as part of Jan Wenzel Schmidt's delegation with Maximilian Krah's aide Jian Guo, who was later convicted of spying for the Chinese government.
