= Gabriela Heinrich =

German politician (born 1963)

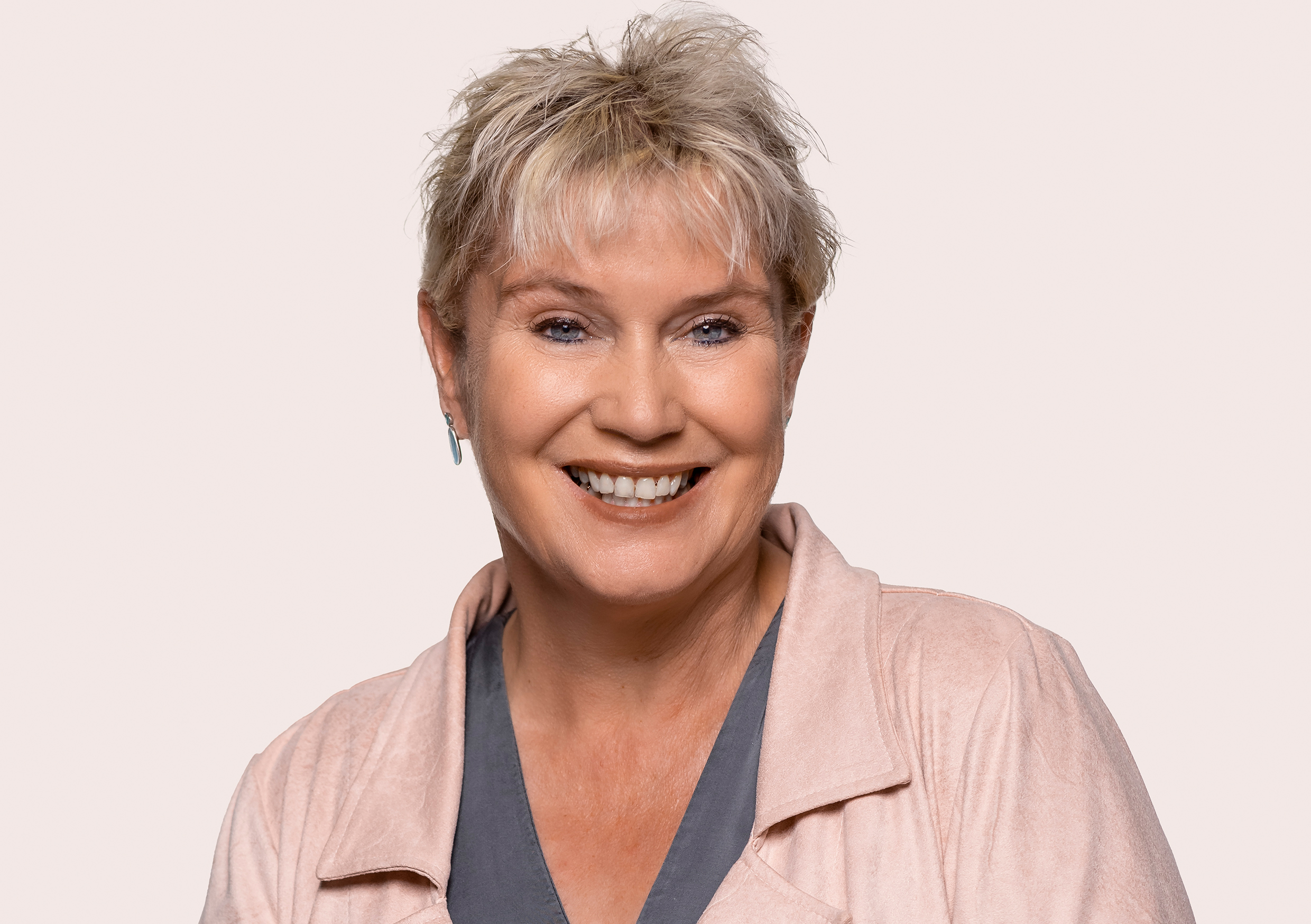

Member of the Bundestag
- Incumbent
- Assumed office 2013

Personal details
- Born: 18 April 1963 (age 62) Berlin, West Germany
- Party: SPD

Gabriela Heinrich (born 18 April 1963) is a German politician of the Social Democratic Party (SPD) who has been serving as a member of the Bundestag from the state of Bavaria since 2013.

== Political career ==
Heinrich first became a member of the Bundestag in the 2013 German federal election. In parliament, she has served on the Committee on Human Rights and Humanitarian Aid (2014-2019, since 2025) and the Committee on Economic Cooperation and Development (2014-2018).

In addition to her role in parliament, Heinrich has been serving as member of the German delegation to the Parliamentary Assembly of the Council of Europe since 2014. On the Assembly, she has been a member of the Committee on Equality and Non-Discrimination (since 2014) and the Committee on Rules of Procedure, Immunities and Institutional Affairs (2015-2018). Since 2019, she has also been part of the German delegation to the Franco-German Parliamentary Assembly. Since 2022, she has been chairing the German-Israeli Parliamentary Friendship Group.

Within her parliamentary group, Heinrich served as one of seven deputies of chairman Rolf Mützenich from 2019 to 2025. She belongs to the Parliamentary Left, a left-wing movement within the group.

In the negotiations to form a so-called traffic light coalition of the SPD, the Green Party and the Free Democratic Party (FDP) following the 2021 federal elections, Heinrich was part of her party's delegation in the working group on foreign policy, defence, development cooperation and human rights, co-chaired by Heiko Maas, Omid Nouripour and Alexander Graf Lambsdorff. In the negotiations to form a Grand Coalition under the leadership of Friedrich Merz's Christian Democrats (CDU together with the Bavarian CSU) and the SPD following the 2025 German elections, she was again part of the SPD delegation in the working group on foreign affairs, defense, development cooperation and human rights, this time led by Johann Wadephul, Florian Hahn and Svenja Schulze.

== Other activities ==
- German Foundation for World Population (DSW), Member of the Parliamentary Advisory Board
