= Michel Brandt =

German politician

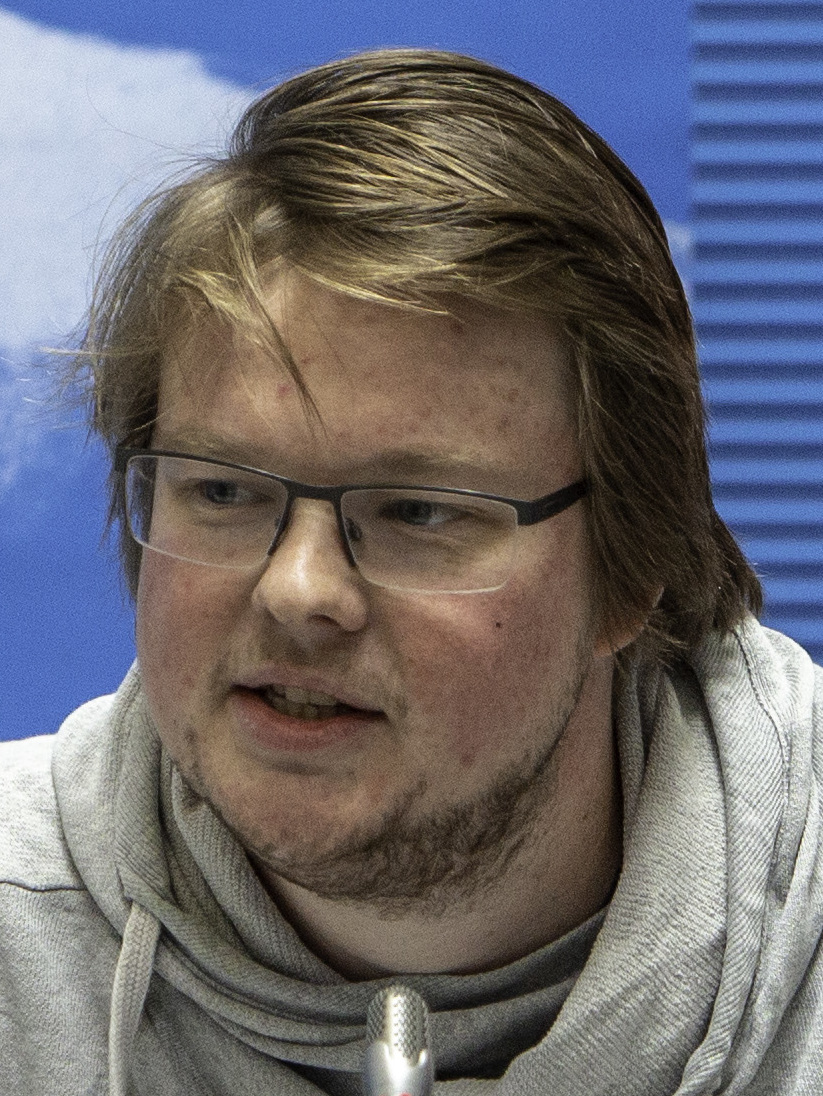
- Michel Brandt in 2018

Member of the Bundestag
- Incumbent
- Assumed office 2017

Member of the European Parliament for Germany
- Incumbent
- Assumed office 22 January 2018

Personal details
- Born: 14 July 1990 (age 35) Achim, West Germany (now Germany)
- Party: The Left
- Occupation: Actors

Michel Brandt (born 14 July 1990) is a German politician. Born in Achim, Lower Saxony, he represents The Left. Michel Brandt served as a member of the Bundestag from the state of Baden-Württemberg from 2017 to 2021.

== Life ==
Michel Brandt studied acting at the Stuttgart University of Music and Performing Arts from 2008 to 2012. During his studies he worked as an actor at the Wilhelma Theatre in Stuttgart, then at the acting studio of the Schauspiel Stuttgart. Since 2012 he is a permanent member of the ensemble at the Badisches Staatstheater Karlsruhe. He became member of the bundestag after the 2017 German federal election. He is a member of the Committee on Human Rights and Humanitarian Aid. His support of the People's Protection Units (YPG) led to controversies as ahead of a visit of Recep Tayyip Erdoğan in 2018; during an inspection of the area the police entered his office to take down a piece of paper depicting a YPG-flag in order to prevent pro–Erdoğan protestors to attack the building. In June 2020, the Federal Constitutional Court issued a verdict that his rights as a parliamentarian were violated with the intrusion of the police. On the 22 January 2018, he entered the Parliamentary Assembly of the council of Europe as a substitute and is currently involved in the committee of migration, refugees and displaced Persons.
