= Renata Alt =

German politician

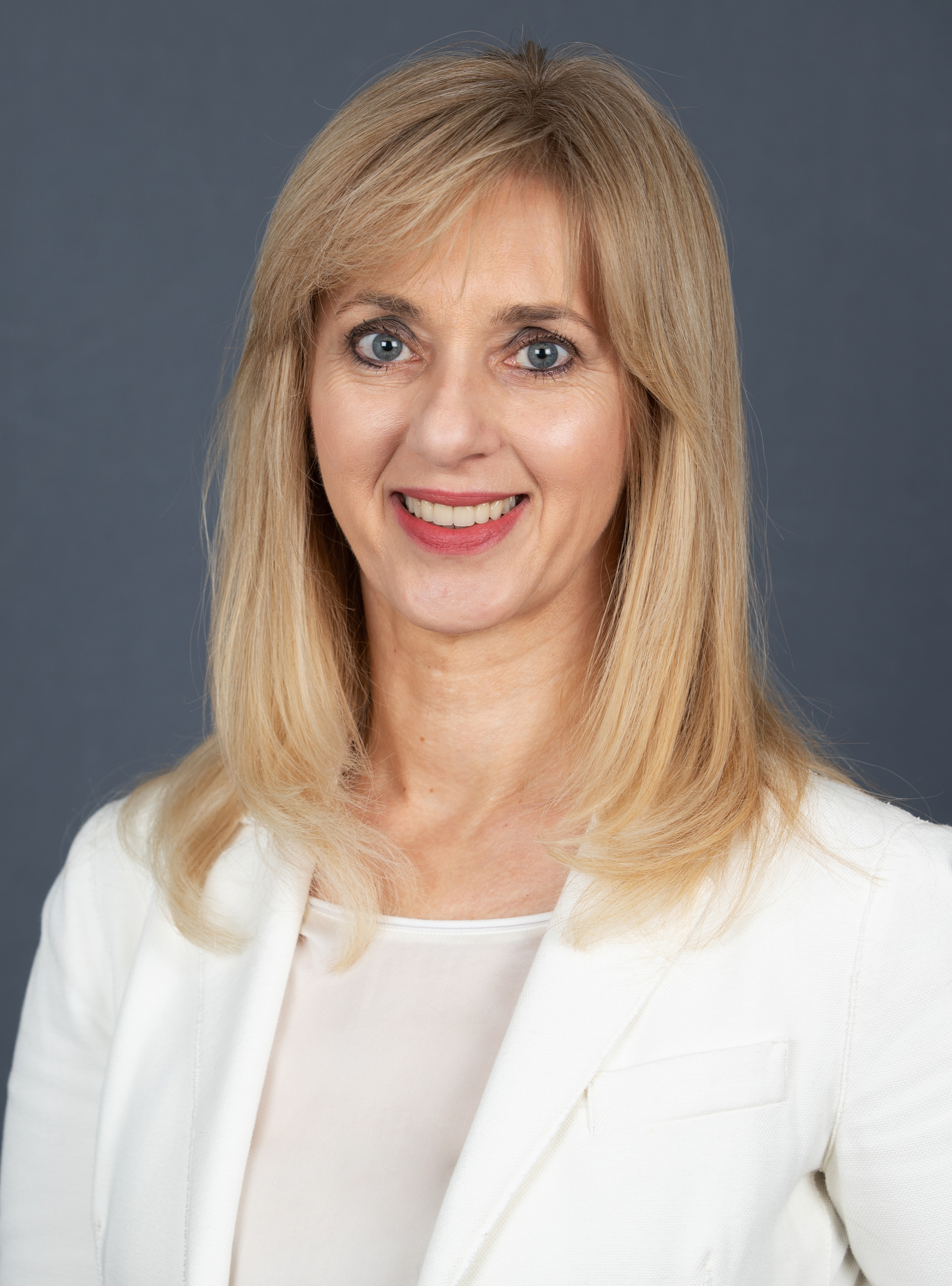
- Alt in 2020

Member of the Bundestag for Baden-Württemberg
- In office 24 October 2017 – 2025
- Constituency: FDP List

Personal details
- Born: 27 August 1965 (age 60) Skalica, Czechoslovakia (now Slovakia)
- Party: Free Democratic Party

Renata Alt (born 27 August 1965) is a German chemical engineer and politician of the Free Democratic Party (FDP) who served as a member of the Bundestag from the state of Baden-Württemberg from 2017 to 2025.

== Early life and career ==
Renata (née Formánková) Alt was born in Skalica (western Slovakia). From 1993 until 1994, Alt worked as an economic attaché at the Consulate General of Slovakia in Munich. Since 1994, she has been operating her own consulting firm.

== Political career ==
Alt became a member of the German Bundestag in the 2017 federal elections, representing the German state of Baden-Württemberg. She has since been serving on the Committee on Foreign Affairs – where she is her parliamentary group's rapporteur on relations with Russia, Central and Eastern Europe, and the Balkans – and on its Sub-Committee for Civilian Crisis Prevention.

From 2021, Alt served as chairwoman of the Committee on Human Rights and Humanitarian Aid.

In addition to her committee assignments, Alt served as chairwoman of the German Parliamentary Friendship Group for relations with the Czech Republic, Slovakia and Hungary, and as deputy chairwoman of the Parliamentary Friendship Group for Relations with the States of South-Eastern Europe (Albania, Kosovo, North Macedonia, Montenegro and Serbia) from 2018 to 2025. From 2022, she was also part of the German delegation to the Parliamentary Assembly of the Organization for Security and Co-operation in Europe.

== Other activities ==
- Foundation "Remembrance, Responsibility and Future", Member of the Board of Trustees (since 2020)
- Center for International Peace Operations (ZIF), Member of the Supervisory Board (since 2018)
- Walther Rathenau Institute, Member of the Advisory Board

== Personal life ==
Alt is married to hair stylist Thomas Alt.
