= Jürgen Braun =

German politician

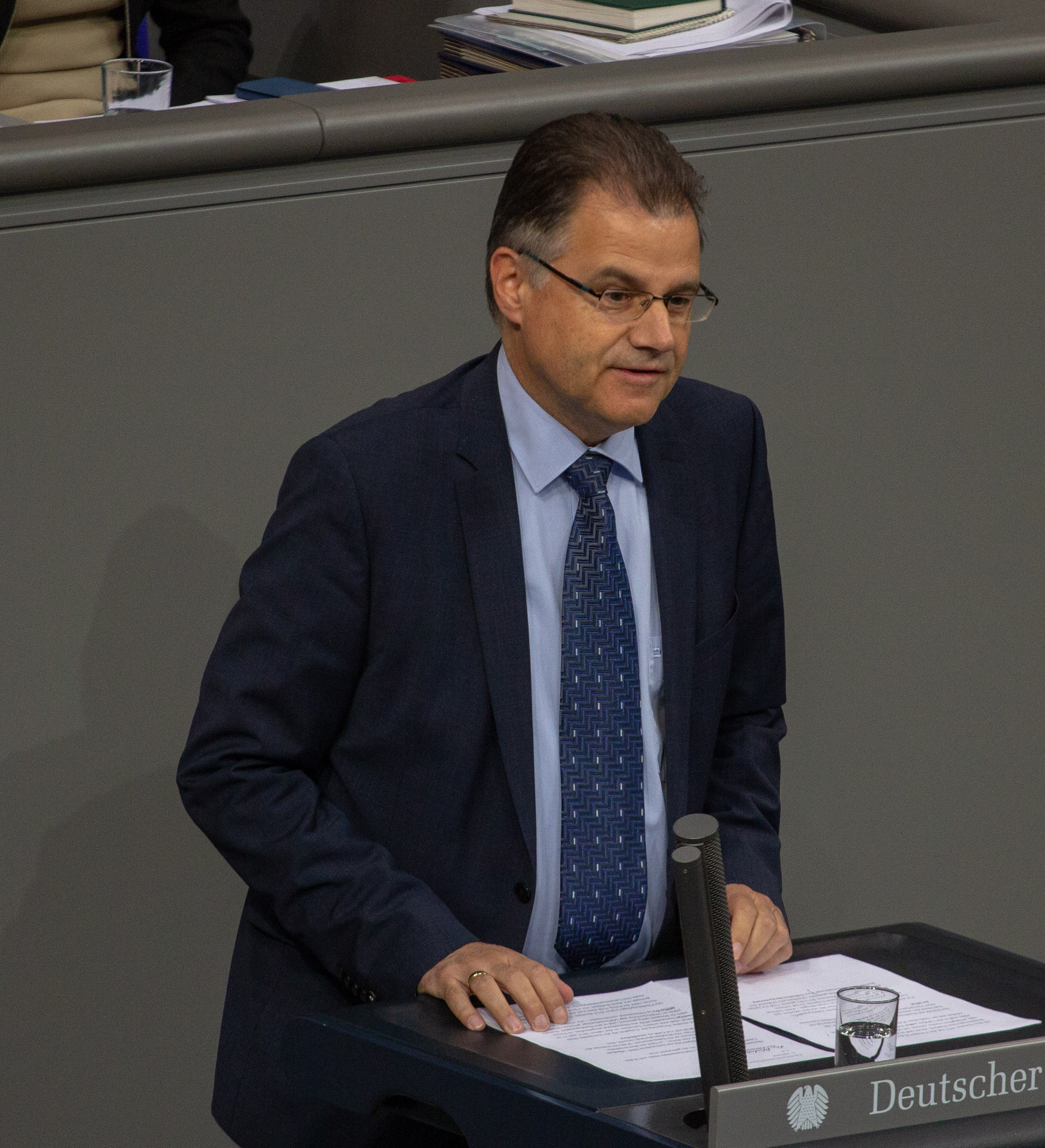
- Braun in 2019

Member of the Bundestag
- Incumbent
- Assumed office 2017

Personal details
- Born: 25 August 1961 (age 64) Bergneustadt, West Germany (now Germany)
- Party: AfD

Jürgen Braun (born 25 August 1961) is a German politician. Born in Bergneustadt, North Rhine-Westphalia, he represents Alternative for Germany (AfD). Jürgen Braunhas served as a member of the Bundestag from the state of Baden-Württemberg since 2017.

== Life ==
He became member of the Bundestag after the 2017 German federal election. He is a member of the Committee on Human Rights and Humanitarian Aid.

== Political Position ==
=== Position on China ===
Braun, the AfD's spokesman on human rights, confessed this contradiction to Eat News, a Taiwanese media, "If you are dealing with the economy or the external economy, you want to have a good trade relationship with China, and Communist China is an important trading partner. So you don’t criticize China too much. But that’s where our party conflicts with what I personally believe. We believe that specific rules of international public law also bind China. China has signed treaties and has ratified them, but conditions of these treaties have not been followed. So, something terrible has happened in China. The United Nations is getting involved."

=== Position on Taiwan ===
On the issue of Taiwan, Braun pledged to join the friendship and cooperation with Taiwan, even though AfD has not yet taken an official position on Taiwan. Braun stressed that he is very sympathetic to the current situation in Taiwan and admires the development of Taiwan and the promotion of more freedom and human rights. When asked whether he thought Taiwan should join international organizations under the name of Taiwan, the Republic of China or Chinese Taipei, Braun argued that many people have different names for Taiwan. Personally, however, he is very sympathetic to the Republic of China as a national name. But he is against China leading the discussion on this issue and dictating how the country should be named". Braun concluded by emphasizing that he fully expects Taiwan to become a member of the World Health Organization.
