= Peter Heidt =

German lawyer and politician

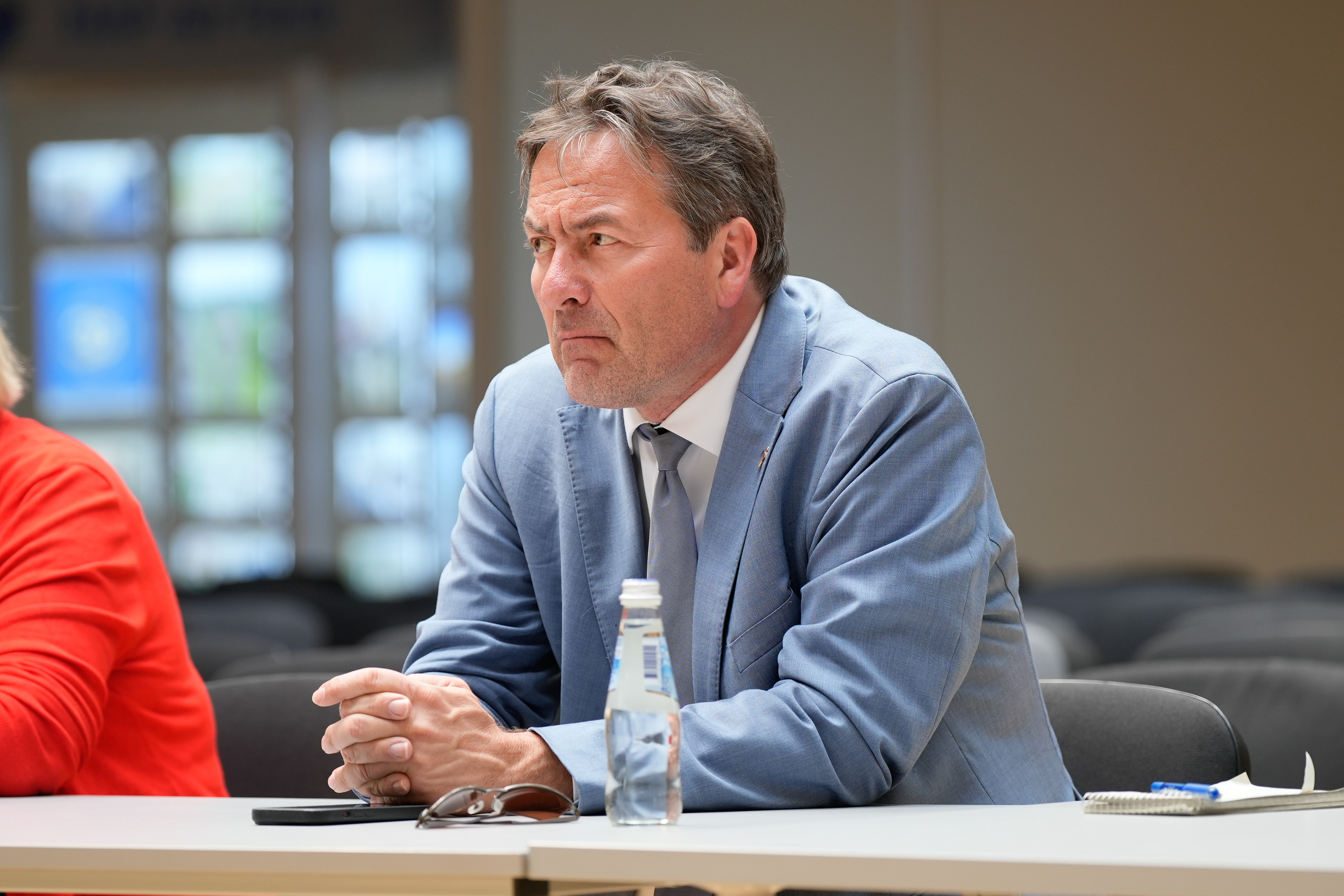

Member of the Bundestag for Hesse
- Incumbent
- Assumed office 1 July 2019
- Preceded by: Nicola Beer
- Constituency: FDP List

Personal details
- Born: 28 April 1965 (age 61) Frankfurt, West Germany
- Party: FDP
- Children: 2
- Education: University of Gießen
- Occupation: Lawyer

Peter Heidt (born 28 April 1965) is a German lawyer and politician of the Free Democratic Party (FDP) who has been serving as a member of the Bundestag from the state of Hesse since 2019.

== Early life and education ==
After graduating from high school in 1984, Heidt did his military service and began studying law at the Justus Liebig University in Gießen. In 1992, he passed the first and in 1995, after completing his legal clerkship in Gießen and Frankfurt, the second state examination. After having worked for two and a half years from 1989 to 1991 as assistant to a member of the state parliament in Wiesbaden, he has been working as an independent lawyer since 1997.

== Political career ==
In the 2017 elections, Heidt was elected to seventh place on the FDP's list for Hesse. In July 2019 he became a member of the German Bundestag as successor to Nicola Beer who had resigned to move to the European Parliament.

In parliament, Heidt is a member of the Committee on Human Rights and Humanitarian Aid and of the Committee on Education, Research and Technology Assessment. Since the 2021 elections, he has been serving as his parliamentary group’s spokesperson for human rights and humanitarian aid.

In 2023, Heidt co-founded the Cross-Party Parliamentary on the Situation of the Uyghurs.
