= Anton Friesen =

German politician

Member of the Bundestag
- Incumbent
- Assumed office 24 October 2017

Personal details
- Born: 15 June 1985 (age 40)
- Party: AfD

Anton Friesen (born 15 June 1985) is a German politician for the populist Alternative for Germany (AfD) and from 2017 to 2021 member of the Bundestag, the federal legislative body.

== Life and achievements ==
Friesen was born 1985 in Uspenka, Kazakhstan and studied political science at the Otto-Suhr-Institut of the Free University of Berlin from 2005 to 2011.

Friesen entered the newly founded populist AfD in 2013 and became member of the Bundestag in 2017.

Friesen denies the scientific consensus on climate change.
