= Margarete Bause =

German politician (born 1959)

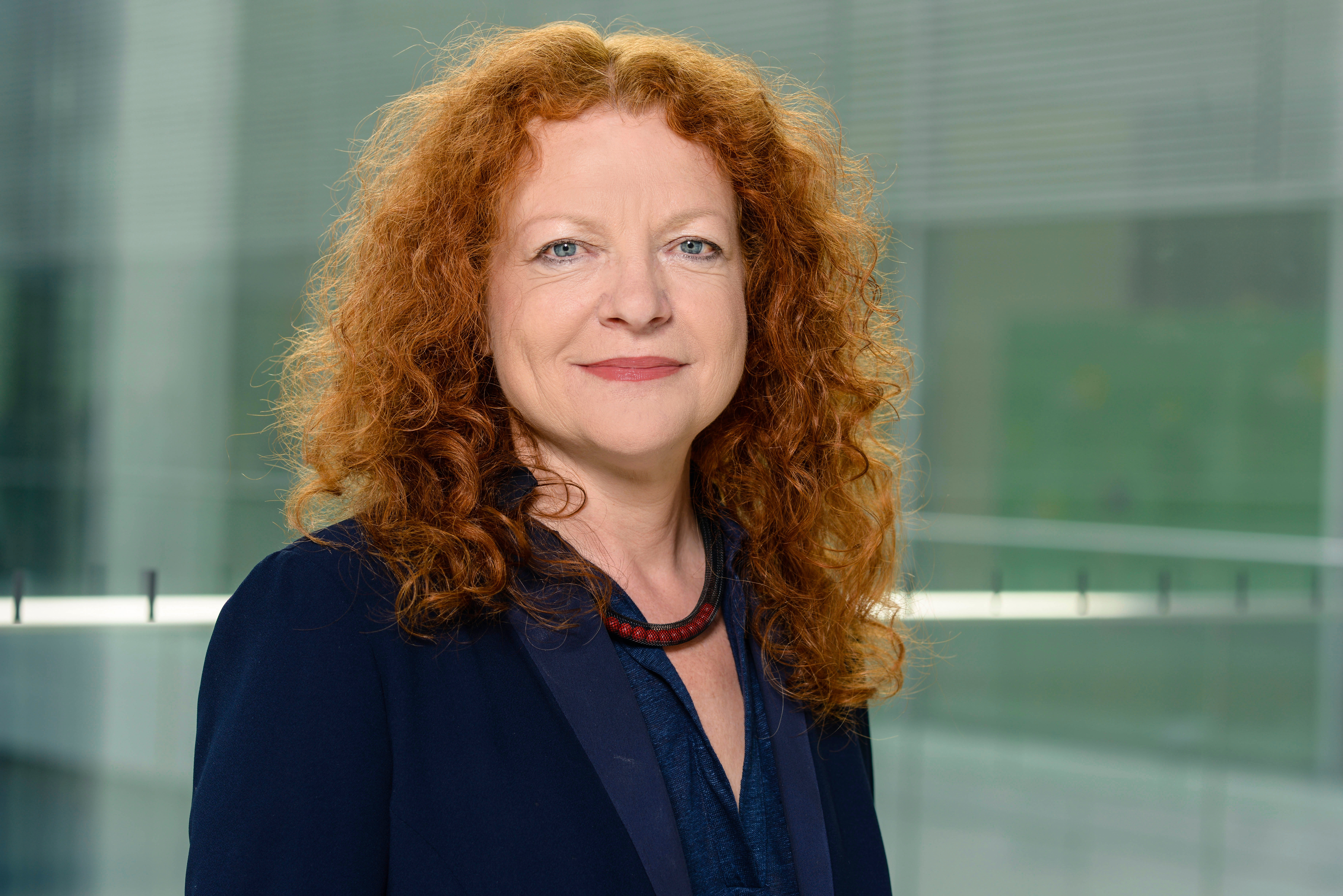
- Margarete Bause in 2020

Member of the Bundestag for Bavaria
- In office 24 October 2017 – 2021
- Constituency: Alliance 90/The Greens List

Leader of The Greens in the Landtag of Bavaria
- In office 6 October 2003 – 15 February 2017
- Preceded by: Sepp Dürr
- Succeeded by: Katharina Schulze
- In office 1989 – 29 July 1990
- In office 22 October 1986 – 1987
- Preceded by: Position established

Member of the Landtag of Bavaria for Upper Bavaria
- In office 6 October 2003 – 24 October 2017
- Preceded by: multi-member district
- Succeeded by: Martin Runge
- In office 22 October 1986 – 29 July 1990
- Preceded by: multi-member district
- Succeeded by: multi-member district

Personal details
- Born: 19 January 1959 (age 67) Wertheim, West Germany
- Party: Greens
- Education: LMU Munich

Margarete Bause (born 19 January 1959) is a German politician of Alliance 90/The Greens. She was a member of the Landtag of Bavaria from 1986 to 1990 and from 2003 to 2017 before serving as a member of the Bundestag from 2017 until 2021, where she was her parliamentary group's spokeswoman for human rights and humanitarian aid.

== Early life and education ==
Margarete Bause was born in Wertheim. After passing the Abitur in Landsberg, she studied German studies, political science and sociology at LMU Munich.

== Political career ==
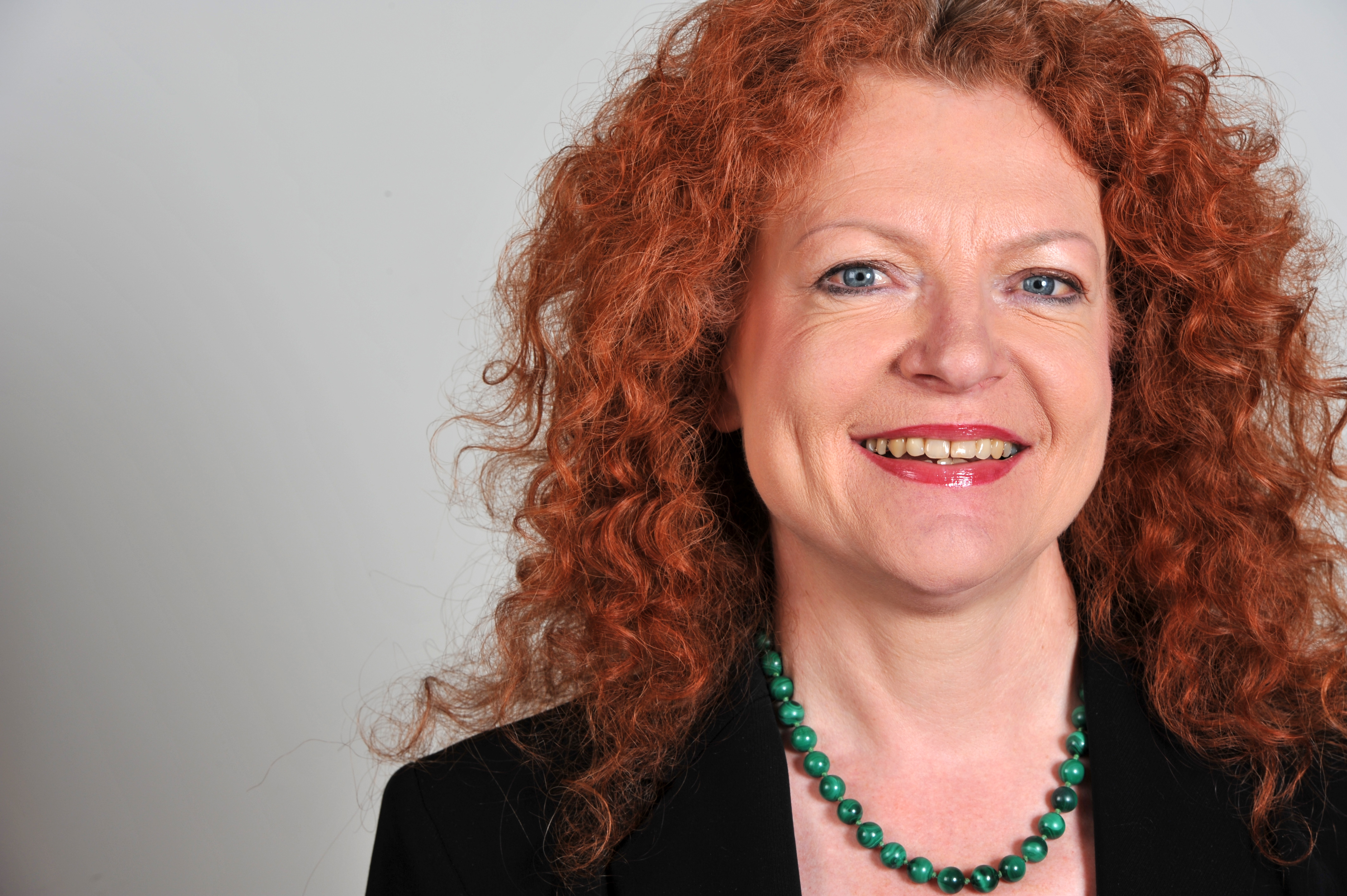
Bause in 2012

Bause became a member of the Green party in 1986 and was one of their state chairs in Bavaria from 1991 to 1993 and 1998 to 2003.

From 1986 until 1990 and from 2003 until 2017, Bause served as a member of the Landtag of Bavaria. In that capacity, she was her parliamentary group's co-chair. From 2004 until 2007, she was also part of the parliamentary inquiry into Monika Hohlmeier over allegations Hohlmeier – during her time as member of the state government – allowed party votes to be falsified and got jobs for friends.

Bause became a member of the German Bundestag in the 2017 elections, representing Munich. In parliament, she served on the Committee on Human Rights and Humanitarian Aid. She was also her parliamentary group's spokesperson on human rights. In addition to her committee assignments, she was a member of the German-Chinese Parliamentary Friendship Group and the German-Belarusian Parliamentary Friendship Group. From 2020, Bause served as co-chair of the Inter-Parliamentary Alliance on China (IPAC).

For the 2021 German federal election, Bause lost the internal election for direct candidacy to Vaniessa Rashid in a contest vote for the Munich East constituency. Her place of 22 on the state list was not enough for her to return to the Bundestag.

== Other activities ==
=== Corporate boards ===
- Umweltbank, Member of the Advisory Board

=== Non-profit organizations ===
- Transparency Germany, Member of the Board (since 2012)
- Munich School of Philosophy, Member of the Board of Trustees
- Wings of Hope Deutschland, Member of the Board of Trustees
- Bayerisches Amerikahaus, Member of the Advisory Board (2014-2017)
- Bayerischer Rundfunk, Member of the Broadcasting Council (1990-1998)

== Political positions ==
Bause is active in the area of human rights in China and supportive of the Uyghurs; her constituency, Munich, is home to the majority of Uighurs living in Germany as well as to the headquarters of the World Uyghur Congress.

In 2014, Bause made headlines when — on a visit to China with a delegation from the Bavarian state parliament — she secretly met with dissident artist Ai Weiwei and later released photos of the meeting.

In August 2019, after asking the German government to support sending UN observers to Xinjiang province, Bause was denied entry to China. The remaining members of the German Bundestag delegation subsequently cancelled their planned China trip.
