= Martin Sichert =

German politician (born 1980)

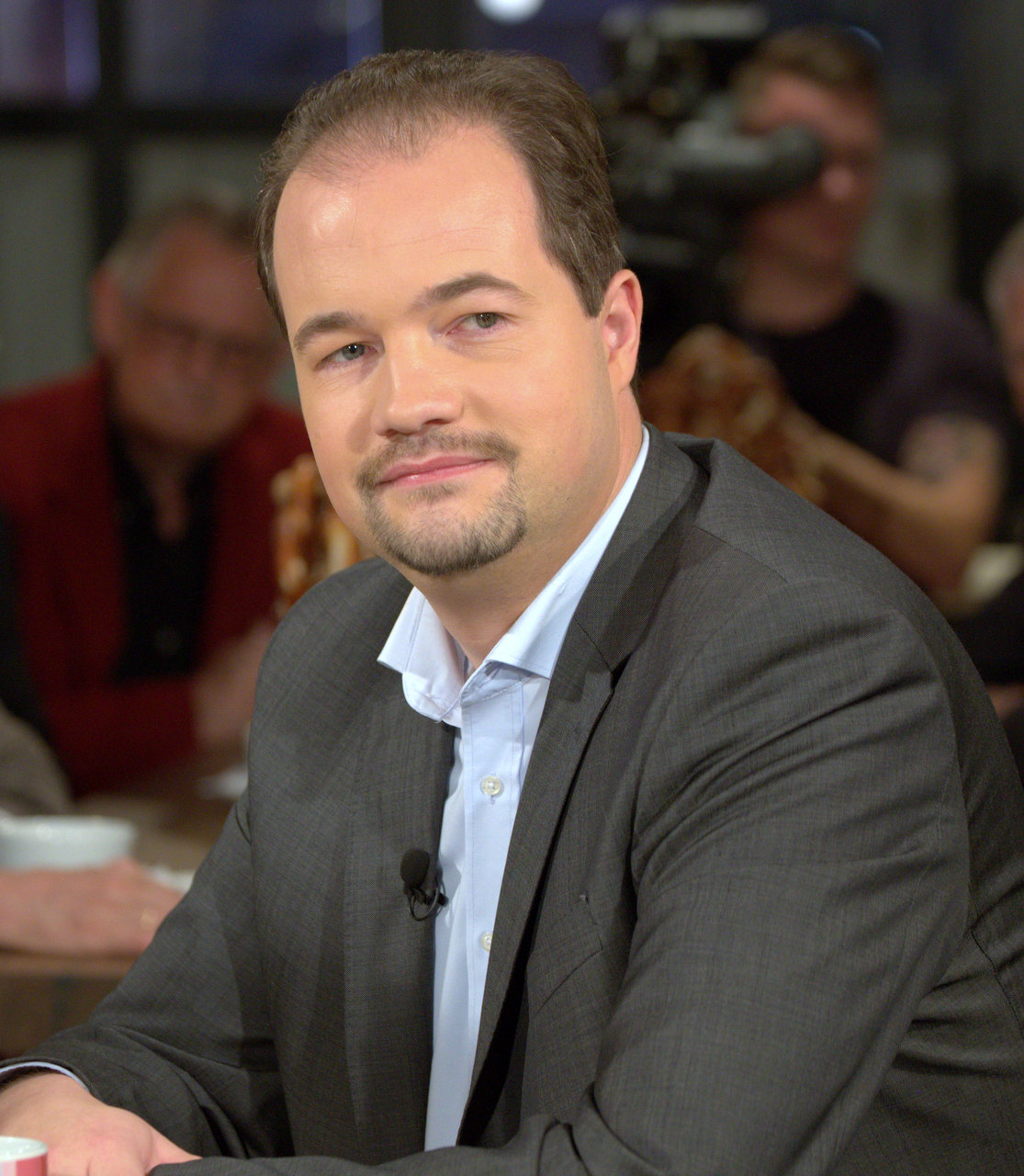
- Sichert in 2018

Chairman of Alternative for Germany Bavaria
- In office 25 November 2017 – 2019

Member of the Bundestag for Bavaria
- Incumbent
- Assumed office 24 October 2017

Personal details
- Born: 10 June 1980 (age 46) Nuremberg, Bavaria, West Germany
- Party: Alternative for Germany
- Education: University of Erlangen-Nuremberg

Martin Johannes Sichert (born 10 June 1980) is a German merchant and politician for the Alternative for Germany (AfD). He has been a member of the 19th Bundestag and was AfD Bavarian state chairman from 2017 to 2019.

Sichert was born in Nuremberg, and completed his studies as a business graduate at the University of Erlangen-Nuremberg in 2006. He worked in Regensburg for more than seven years. At the beginning of the millennium, he was a member of the Young Liberals. Martin Sichert has been chairman of the AfD district association Nuremberg / Schwabach and was 2017 direct candidate in the constituency Nuremberg North. From 2017 to 2019 he was State Chairman of the AfD Bayern.

== Positions ==
On Facebook, the Wehrmacht's crimes in World War II were trivialized several times. In October 2020, Sichert said in the Bundestag that “there will soon be no difference between an epidemic emergency of national scope and Hitler’s Enabling Act of 1933”.
