= Martin Hebner =

German politician (1959–2021)

Member of the Bundestag
- In office 24 October 2017 – 7 July 2021

Personal details
- Born: 10 November 1959
- Died: 7 July 2021 (aged 61)
- Party: AfD

Martin Hebner (10 November 1959 – 7 July 2021) was a German politician for the populist Alternative for Germany (AfD) and from 2017 member of the Bundestag.

== Biography ==
Hebner was born in 1959 in the West German city of Frankfurt am Main and became an IT consultant.

Hebner entered the newly founded AfD in 2013 and became 'Schriftführer' (recording clerk) of the party state organisation in Bavaria.

Hebner became member of the Bundestag after the 2017 German federal election and was considered to be part of the right-wing faction Flügel (wing) of the AfD.
