= Waldemar Herdt =

German politician (born 1962)

Member of the Bundestag
- In office 24 October 2017 – 26 October 2021

Personal details
- Born: 28 November 1962 (age 63) Kostanay Region, Kazakh SSR, Soviet Union
- Party: AfD
- Other political affiliations: Party of Bible-abiding Christians (before 2013); Centre Party (2019)

Waldemar Herdt (born 28 November 1962) is a German politician for the far-right party Alternative for Germany (AfD) and former member of the Bundestag (2017–2021).

== Life and politics ==
Herdt was born 1962 in Zhetikara District, Kazakh SSR, Soviet Union and a leading member of the factious and evangelical Party of Bible-abiding Christians before he entered the AfD in 2013.

Herdt became a member of the Bundestag after the German federal election on 24 September 2017.

Herdt was member of the AfD so called "Syria Contact-group", a pro-Assad activist group of AfD MPs. Jürgen Pohl, Steffen Kotre, Udo Hemmelgarn, Frank Pasemann and right-wing extremist John Hoewer were also part of the group. Assad's regime fell on 8 December 2024.
