= Ulrich Lechte =

German politician

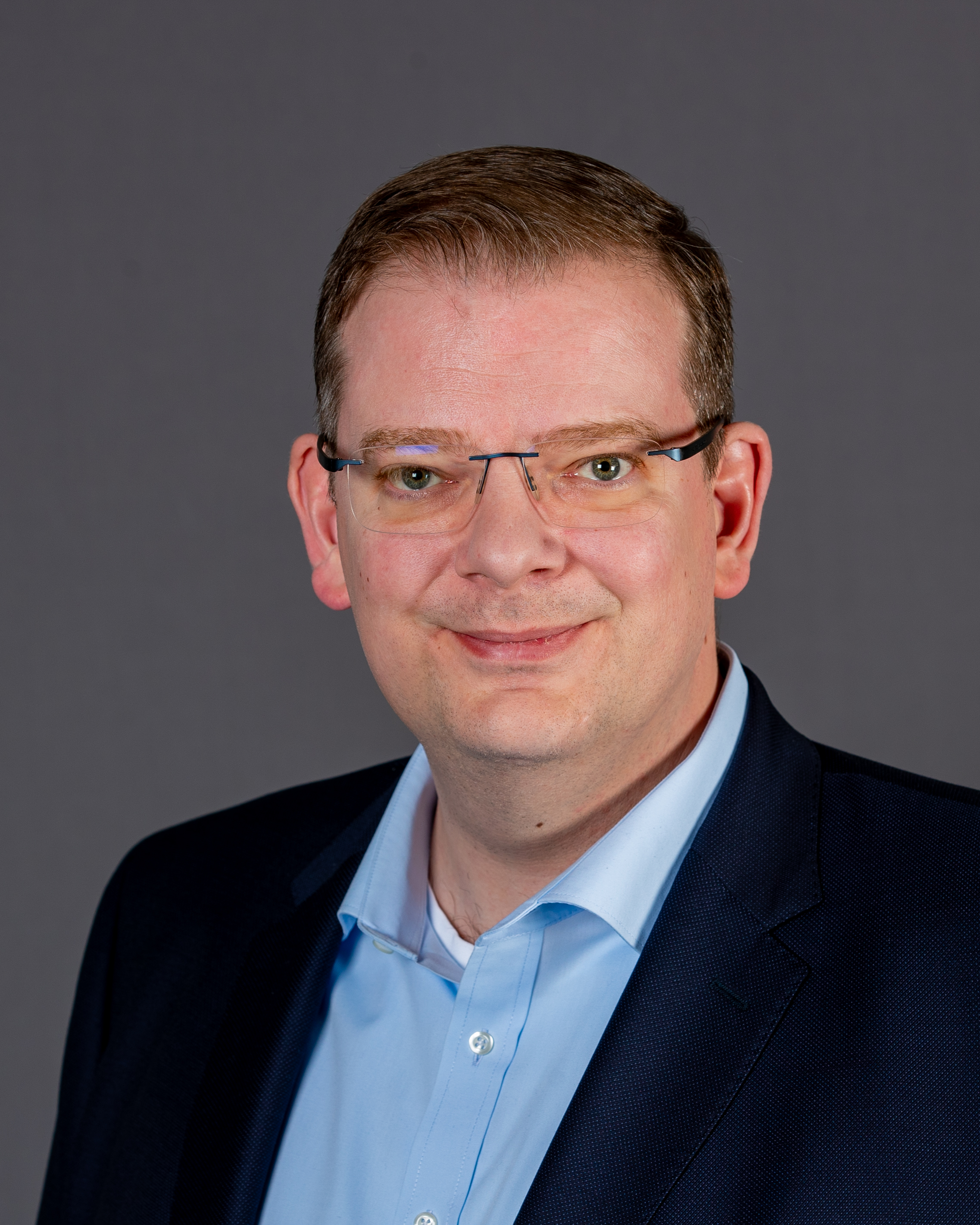
- Ulrich Lechte in 2020

Member of the Bundestag
- In office 2017–2025

Personal details
- Born: 26 August 1977 (age 49) Sinsheim, West Germany (now Germany)
- Party: FDP
- Education: University of Regensburg

Ulrich Lechte (born 26 August 1977) is a German politician of the Free Democratic Party (FDP) who served as a member of the Bundestag from the state of Bavaria from 2017 to 2025.

== Early life and career ==
Lechte was born in Sinsheim, grew up in Neckarbischofsheim, and attended the Collegium Augustinianum Gaesdonck, Episcopal grammar school with boarding school in Goch from 1988 onwards, where he graduated from in 1996. Afterwards he began studying political science at the University of Regensburg.

Lechte is a business economist (VWA). He worked in sales for four years until he became sales manager and editor of the Regensburg city newspaper in 2001. From 2006 to 2013, he headed the constituency office of Horst Meierhofer, then member of the Bundestag. When the FDP left the Bundestag in 2013, Lechte moved to a company in the renewable energy sector in 2014 as assistant to the management and head of controlling. From 2016 he worked as a consultant for a Düsseldorf law firm.

== Political career ==
=== Early career ===
Lechte joined the FDP and its youth organization, the Young Liberals, in 1998. In 2010, he was one of the founding members of the Liberal Gays and Lesbians (LiSL).

=== Member of the German Parliament, 2017–2025 ===
Lechte became a member of the Bundestag in the 2017 German federal election. In parliament, he was a member of the Committee on Foreign Affairs and served as his parliamentary group's spokesperson on foreign affairs. Between 2017 and 2021, he chaired the Subcommittee on the United Nations, International Organizations and Globalization.

In addition to his committee assignments, Lechte was part of the German-Egyptian Parliamentary Friendship Group, the German-Turkish Parliamentary Friendship Group as well as member of the Parliamentary Group of Friends Berlin-Taipei.

In 2019, Lechte unsuccessfully challenged incumbent Daniel Föst for the leadership of the FDP in Bavaria. Since then, he has been serving as one of three deputy chairpersons of the FDP in Bavaria under the leadership of successive chairs Föst and Martin Hagen.

In 2023, Lechte co-founded the Cross-Party Parliamentary Group on the Situation of the Uyghurs.

== Other activities ==
- Centre for International Peace Operations (ZIF), Member of the Supervisory Board (since 2022)
