= Ferat Koçak =

German politician

Ferat Koçak MdB
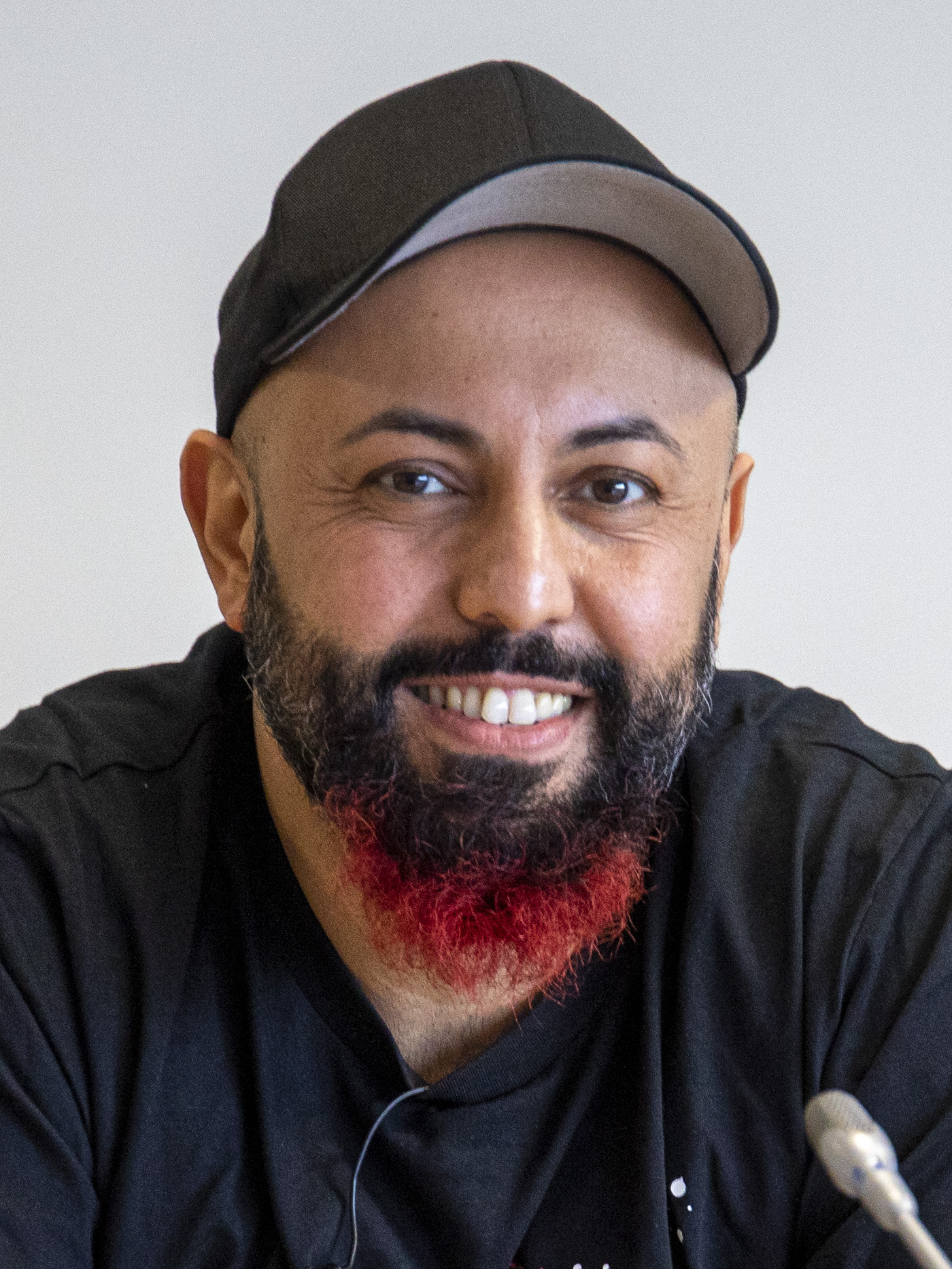
- Koçak in 2022

Member of the Bundestag; for Berlin-Neukölln
- Incumbent
- Assumed office 25 March 2025
- Preceded by: Hakan Demir

Member of the; Berlin House of Representatives; for Neukölln 5
- In office 26 September 2021 – 30 April 2025
- Preceded by: Robbin Juhnke
- Succeeded by: Franziska Leschewitz

Personal details
- Born: Ferat Ali Koçak; 26 May 1979 (age 47) West Berlin, West Germany
- Party: Die Linke
- Education: Free University of Berlin (Dipl.)
- Website: teamferat.de

Ferat Ali Koçak (born 26 May 1979) is a German politician (The Left) of Kurdish origins. He was a member of the Abgeordnetenhaus of Berlin from 2021 to 2025, and has been a member of the German Bundestag since 2025. He won the direct mandate in the constituency of Neukölln with 30% of the votes, making him the first Left Party politician to win a constituency outside the former GDR.

== Early life ==
Koçak was born and grew up in West Berlin as the son of Kurdish-Alevi immigrants. His father, a left-wing trade unionist, escaped from Turkey and sought asylum in Germany in 1980, after the 1980 coup. His mother, a women's rights activist, was the daughter of guest workers who came to Berlin in the 1960s. As his parents worked when he was a kid, he was at times raised by his grandparents or by a friend that helped his mother's family after they arrived in Germany. Koçak did his civilian service at the Berlin Kurdistan Culture and Aid Association.

He studied economics at the Free University of Berlin and graduated with a degree in economics. Koçak then worked for the Allianz Group, first as a trainee and then, after successfully completing his exams, in management. He then worked as a marketing director with a focus on digital marketing at the Berliner Hochschule für Technik (BHT) and at other universities, and later as a campaigner at Campact.

== Political career ==
Koçak was raised by his parents in left-wing Kurdish and Turkish circles in Berlin. He has been involved in anti-racism and anti-fascism activism since his youth and is currently active in various alliances and movements, such as the alliance Aufstehen gegen Rassismus and Links*kanax.

He joined The Left in 2016 due to the rise of right-wing groups, particularly the far-right Alternative for Germany, which he and his friends wanted to help fight. In the 2016 Berlin state election, Koçak stood for The Left in the Neukölln 6 constituency of the Abgeordnetenhaus of Berlin. He managed to double the share of the vote for his party compared to the last election, but he failed to gain a seat in the Abgeordnetenhaus.

He is currently deputy spokesperson for the Neukölln district association.

=== Legislative service ===
In the 2021 Berlin state election, Koçak ran for the Abgeordnetenhaus again in the Neukölln 5 constituency, and was elected via the Left Party's state list. He was re-elected to the Abgeordnetenhaus in the 2023 repeat election.

Koçak is the spokesman for The Left's parliamentary group on the topics of anti-fascist politics as well as refugee and climate policy. He is a member of the Committees for the Interior, Security and Order as well as the Environment and Climate Protection. He is a deputy member of the Committee for the Protection of the Constitution. He is also an assessor of the Presidium of the Abgeordnetenhaus.

In the 2025 federal election, he ran as a direct candidate for The Left in the Berlin-Neukölln constituency and won the direct mandate for the party.

=== Attacks by right-wing terrorists ===
Koçak's fame as a left-wing activist in Neukölln repeatedly led to right-wing attacks on him. They were linked to a series of right-wing extremist attacks in the south of Berlin, also known as the Neukölln complex. In 2018, perpetrators suspected of belonging to the neo-Nazi scene carried out an arson attack on his family home in south Neukölln. The attack was part of a series of right-wing attacks on politicians, trade unionists, people with a history of migration and anti-fascist activists in Neukölln, which also affected the bookseller Heinz Ostermann, the trade unionist Mirjam Blumenthal (SPD) and the historian Claudia von Gélieu, among others, and which also included the unsolved murder of Burak Bektas. Together with others affected by the series of terror attacks, Koçak is fighting to have the attacks investigated. It came to light that both the Berlin State Office of Criminal Investigation and the Office for the Protection of the Constitution had been informed that two well-known Neukölln neo-Nazis had observed and followed Koçak in the weeks before the arson attack. Koçak then publicly claimed that the Neukölln Nazi scene was involved with the Berlin security authorities.

In a criminal trial, to which Koçak was only admitted as a co-plaintiff after an appeal, the two accused neo-Nazis Thilo P. and Sebastian T. were acquitted of the charge of aiding and abetting arson in December 2022 due to a lack of evidence. The public prosecutor's office appealed against this.

The appeal trial before the Berliner Landgericht has been ongoing since September 2024 and is also about potential entanglements between the security authorities, the judiciary and the far-right scene. The public prosecutor from the first trial was withdrawn.

In December 2024, the defendants were sentenced to prison.

He has received several threats from right-wing groups such as one calling itself "NSU 2.0".

=== September 2026 ===
Koçak celebrated the 2026 Berlin state election in September 2026 and was photographed with a known pro-Palestine activist and had exchanged messages with the son of the so-called Remmo-Clan boss Issa Remmo, sending "regards" to the father in one of the messages. This caused criticism from various politicians and promted him to pause his activities with the Committee on Internal Affairs of the Bundestag. Fellow party member Katharina König-Preuss even stated that Koçak could no longer be the parties speaker for Anti-fascism and should be stripped of the position. Irene Mihalic from the Green party said that Koçak must not have access to sensitive information beeing a member of the Committee on Internal Affairs and should give up his Bundestag mandate.

== Political positions ==
Koçak is politically active in the areas of anti-racism, anti-fascism and climate justice.

In particular, he is committed to the complete investigation of any right-wing involvement in the Berlin security authorities. In a speech he gave in the Berlin House of Representatives in February 2022, he criticised police violence and state repression against left-wing activists. He also advocates for the concerns of refugees, criticises the tightening of asylum laws and calls for an unconditional right to stay for all refugees. Koçak sees himself as a "movement leftist".

Koçak is also involved in climate policy and climate justice. He has spoken at numerous climate movement events, such as rallies organised by Fridays for Future or Ende Gelände. He calls for a combination of anti-racist, anti-fascist and ecological struggles.

=== Kurdish activism ===
Koçak has been involved in Kurdish associations since his studies and has repeatedly criticised the Turkish government for its actions against Kurdish groups and their autonomy efforts, including in northern Iraq.

In October 2024, he visited a Kurdish cultural centre in Berlin-Reinickendorf and witnessed an attempted arson attack, in which no one was injured. At the time of the attempted attack, there were up to 40 people in the rooms of the centre. His visit took place due to a police search of the centre the day before, during which its co-chair Hüseyin Yılmaz and another person were provisionally arrested. Yılmaz was mayor of the city of Ağrı from 1999 to 2004 for the HADEP party (today known as DEM Party), whose politics are also influenced by the ideals of the PKK. Koçak and the association's board assumed that Turkish nationalists had committed the offence. Yılmaz also referred to the ‘Global Free Öcalan Days’ taking place at the same time, with which left-wing groups were campaigning for the release of Abdullah Öcalan. After the raid, Koçak criticised the PKK ban: "Again and again, German politicians use the PKK ban to arbitrarily take action against Kurdish associations and activists. German politics is making itself an accomplice to Turkish fascism!"

=== Middle East conflict ===
After October 7 attacks in 2023, Koçak emphasised: "Nothing can justify terror". At the same time, however, he also criticised the subsequent war and spoke of ‘Israel's brutal attack with tens of thousands of dead’, which was "even less justifiable". According to his own statements, he stands "on the side of international law and human rights". According to Tagesspiegel, he has "close contact with pro-Palestinian activists" and has organised pro-Palestinian demonstrations at which anti-Semitic incidents have occurred. However, he rejects the stance of Islamists and said: "Of course we are against anti-Semitism". He condemned an arson attack on a pro-Israeli bar in Neukölln. On the Middle East conflict, Koçak published joint articles with the Red platform, which the US State Department claims is secretly financed by Russia.

Koçak uses the Jerusalem Declaration on Anti-Semitism to assess anti-Semitism. In 2024, the Tagesspiegel criticised the fact that Koçak, as an observer of pro-Palestine demonstrations on the Gaza war, denounced alleged police violence rather than anti-Israel slogans. In February 2025, Koçak invited British politician Jeremy Corbyn, who has been criticised for trivialising Hamas, to an election campaign event. The event was cancelled following criticism. According to Zeit Online, Koçak's positions on the Middle East conflict and a door-to-door campaign, as journalist Ruairí Casey also pointed out, helped him to win the direct mandate.

== Personal life ==
Koçak lives in the south of Neukölln, where his parents moved from Kreuzberg after they were priced out of their apartment, which lost its social housing rent restriction.
