= Christian Democratic Employees' Association =

German social policy organisation

The Christian Democratic Workers Association (German: Christlich-Demokratische Arbeitnehmerschaft, CDA) is a German association connected with the Christian Democratic Union with the substantive focus on "social policy". Another competing self-designation is "CDU social committee".

The Christian-Socials (Christlich-Soziale) are one of the three major groups within the CDU in addition to the Liberals and the Conservatives. Thus social committees from the Christian-social movement have emerged within the CDU.

The headquarters of the Foundation is Königswinter in Bonn, while there is an office in Berlin.

== History ==
The CDA was created after the Second World War, by mostly Christian trade unionists in the industrial areas of North Rhine-Westphalia. The official establishment of the CDA was in 1946 at Kolping House in Herne, Germany. In the early years the CDA's program concerned mainly issues such as the health and safety of workers and their conditions in the factories. Since the association adopted the Offenburger Declaration in 1967, its focus moved to wider societal issues. Priorities of the CDA today cover pension, health and family policy, in addition to labor and social policy.

== Internal structure ==
Subsidiary bodies of the CDU social committees include its Youth movement, the Youth CDA, former Young Workers Association and the Association of Women in the CDA. The Youth CDA was founded in 1947 also in Herne. The Youth CDA is organized into 15 regional associations, all members of the CDA are up to 35 years of age are automatically a member of the Youth CDA.

== Chairmen ==
- 1947–1949 Johannes Albers
- 1949–1958 Jakob Kaiser
- 1958 Karl Arnold
- 1958–1963 Johannes Albers
- 1963–1977 Hans Katzer
- 1977–1987 Norbert Blüm
- 1987–1993 Ulf Fink
- 1993 Werner Schreiber
- 1994–2001 Rainer Eppelmann
- 2001–2004 Hermann-Josef Arentz
- 2004–2005 Gerald Weiß
- Since 2005, Karl-Josef Laumann

== See also ==
- Christian Trade Union Federation of Germany
