= Andreas Audretsch =

German politician (born 1984)

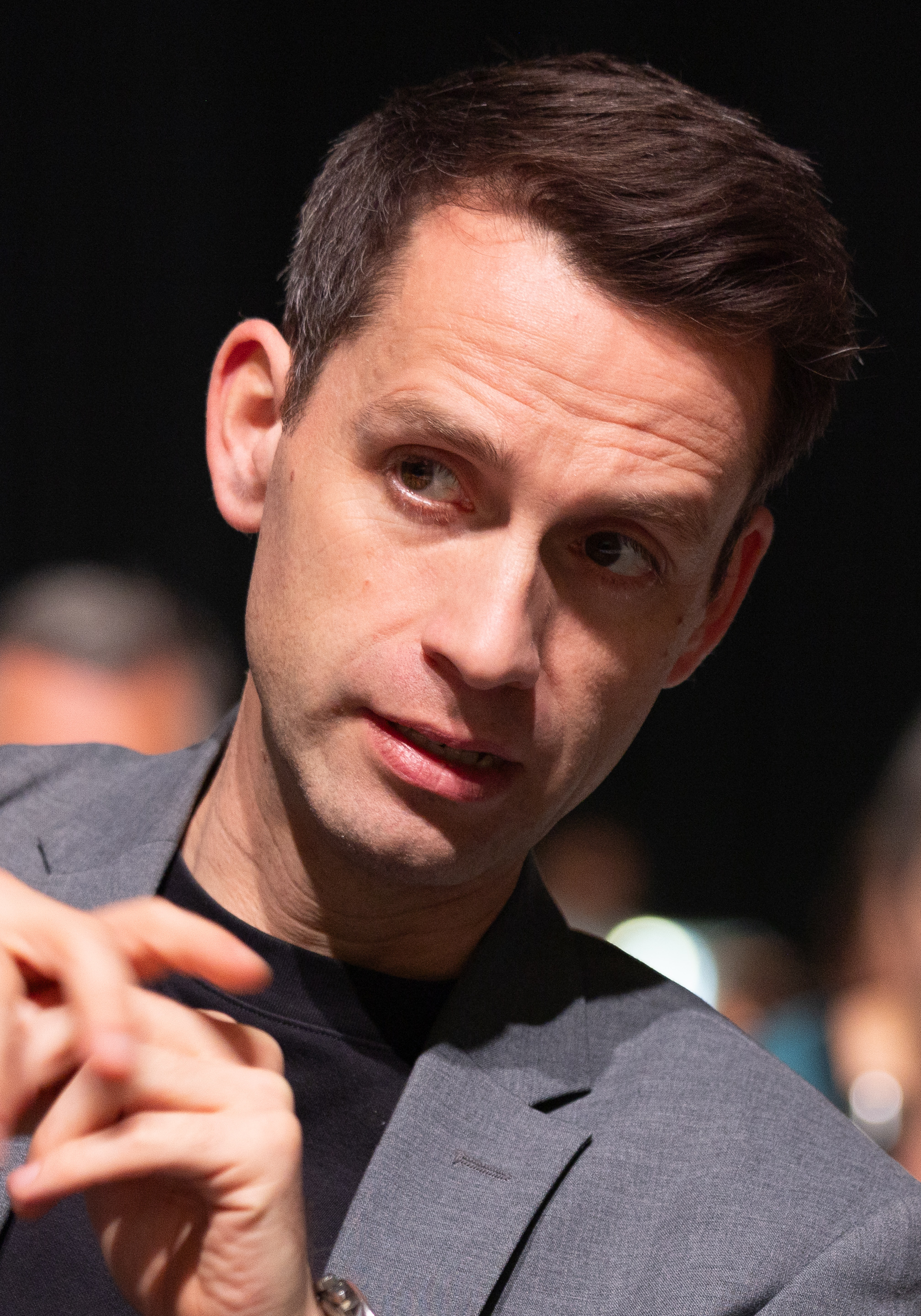
- Audretsch in 2025

Member of the Bundestag
- Incumbent
- Assumed office 26 October 2021

Personal details
- Born: 25 June 1984 (age 42) Stuttgart, Germany
- Party: Alliance 90/The Greens
- Education: University of Potsdam

Andreas Audretsch (born 25 June 1984) is a German politician of the Alliance 90/The Greens who has been serving as a member of the Bundestag since the 2021 German federal election. He has also been Deputy Chairman of the Alliance 90/The Greens parliamentary group in the Bundestag since May 2022.

== Early life and education ==
Audretsch was born in Stuttgart. He studied Politics, Journalism and Sociology at the University of Münster before continuing his studies at the Free University of Berlin and the University of Potsdam until 2008. He also earned a PhD at the University of Potsdam in political science.

== Life and career ==
Following this, from 2006 to 2015, he worked as a radio journalist for Deutschlandradio and ARD radio, among others. He carried out this work on a part-time basis from 2009, as he worked as a consultant in the German Bundestag from then until 2015. In 2013 and 2014, he held a teaching position at the University of Lüneburg. From 2015 to 2021, he worked as a press spokesperson in political communication for the Federal Ministry for Economic Affairs and Energy, the Office of the Federal President and the Federal Ministry for Family Affairs, Senior Citizens, Women and Youth.

In June 2020, together with historian Claudia Gatzka, he published the book "Schleichend an die Macht. Wie die Neue Rechte Geschichte instrumentalisiert, um Deutungshoheit über unsere Zukunft zu erlangen über den “massiven Angriff der Neuen Rechten auf unsere liberale Demokratie"". In May 2022, his book Growing Together. A new progressive movement emerges was published.

== Political career ==
Audretsch has been a member of Bündnis 90/Die Grünen since 2011 and has been involved with the party since 2009.From 2013 to 2016, he was a member of the board and spokesperson for the board of the Greens in Berlin-Neukölln. From 2015 to 2016, he was a member of the Green Party Council in Berlin. From 2016 to 2021, he was a member of the state board of Bündnis 90/Die Grünen Berlin.

In the 2021 Bundestag election, Audretsch ran in the Berlin-Neukölln constituency, where he came second behind Hakan Demir (SPD; 25.8'%) with 19.7% of the first votes and thus missed out on the direct mandate. However, he entered the 20th German Bundestag via fourth place on his party's Berlin state list. In parliament, Audretsch has been a member of the Committee on Social Affairs since 2021. He is also a deputy member of the Joint Committee, Mediation Committee and Budget Committee. Since 2022, he has been serving as one his parliamentary group's deputy chairs, under the leadership of co-chairs Britta Haßelmann and Katharina Dröge, where he oversees the group's activities on financial policy, economic and social affairs.

In the negotiations to form a coalition government in Berlin under the prospective leadership of Elif Eralp following the 2026 state elections, Audretsch led his party’s delegation in the working group on labour and social affairs.

== Political positions ==
In the 2021 federal elections, Audretsch focused on labour and social issues, the fight against right-wing extremism and "One World". He also argued that the Berlin rent cap should be made possible by federal law, that protection against dismissal should be tightened and that tenant electricity should be made possible. He also advocated the abolition of unemployment benefits II and a guaranteed livelihood. He also believes that the minimum wage should be raised to twelve euros and that precarious work should be ended. For the "fight against the right", he proposes a law to promote democracy.

== Memberships ==
Audretsch has been a member of Ver.di since 2012. He has been a Policy Fellow at the think tank "Das Progressive Zentrum" since 2017.

== Personal life ==
Audretsch has lived in Berlin-Neukölln since 2006. He is homosexual.
