= Cologne III =

Federal electoral district of Germany

94 Cologne III
- Electoral district for the Bundestag
- Cologne III in 2025
- State: North Rhine-Westphalia
- Population: 309,700 (2019)
- Electorate: 204,539 (2021)
- Major settlements: Cologne (partial)
- Area: 122.9 km^{2}

Current electoral district
- Created: 1949
- Party: Alliance 90/The Greens
- Member: Katharina Dröge
- Elected: 2025

Cologne III (German: Köln III) is an electoral constituency (German: Wahlkreis) represented in the Bundestag. It elects one member via first-past-the-post voting. Under the current constituency numbering system, it is designated as constituency 94. It is located in western North Rhine-Westphalia, comprising the northwestern part of the city of Cologne.

Cologne II was created for the inaugural 1949 federal election. From 2002 to 2025, it has been represented by Rolf Mützenich of the Social Democratic Party (SPD). Since 2025 it has been represented by Katharina Dröge of the Alliance 90/The Greens.

== Geography ==
Cologne III is located in western North Rhine-Westphalia. As of the 2021 federal election, it comprises the northwestern part of the independent city of Cologne, specifically the districts of Ehrenfeld, Nippes, and Chorweiler.

== History ==
Cologne III was created in 1949. In the 1949 election, it was North Rhine-Westphalia constituency 9 in the numbering system. From 1953 through 1961, it was number 68. From 1965 through 1998, it was number 61. From 2002 through 2009, it was number 96. In the 2013 through 2021 elections, it was number 95. From the 2025 election, it has been number 94.

Originally, the constituency comprised the area of Cologne on the right bank of the Rhine. In the 1965 through 1976 elections, it comprised the districts of Nippes, Niehl, Mengenich, Longerich, Chorweiler, and Worringen, as well as the area of Ehrenfeld north of Subbelrather Straße. It acquired its current borders in the 1980 election.

Election	No.	Name	Borders
1949	9	Köln III	Cologne city (only the area on the right bank of the Rhine)
1953	68	Köln III	Cologne city (only the area on the right bank of the Rhine)
1957	68	Köln III	Cologne city (only the area on the right bank of the Rhine)
1961	68	Köln III	Cologne city (only the area on the right bank of the Rhine)
1965	61	Köln III	Cologne city (only Nippes, Niehl, Mengenich, Longerich, Chorweiler, and Worringen districts, and the area of Ehrenfeld district north of Subbelrather Straße)
1969	61	Köln III	Cologne city (only Nippes, Niehl, Mengenich, Longerich, Chorweiler, and Worringen districts, and the area of Ehrenfeld district north of Subbelrather Straße)
1972	61	Köln III	Cologne city (only Nippes, Niehl, Mengenich, Longerich, Chorweiler, and Worringen districts, and the area of Ehrenfeld district north of Subbelrather Straße)
1976	61	Köln III	Cologne city (only Nippes, Niehl, Mengenich, Longerich, Chorweiler, and Worringen districts, and the area of Ehrenfeld district north of Subbelrather Straße)
1980	61	Köln III	Cologne city (only Ehrenfeld, Nippes, and Chorweiler districts)
1983	61	Köln III	Cologne city (only Ehrenfeld, Nippes, and Chorweiler districts)
1987	61	Köln III	Cologne city (only Ehrenfeld, Nippes, and Chorweiler districts)
1990	61	Köln III	Cologne city (only Ehrenfeld, Nippes, and Chorweiler districts)
1994	61	Köln III	Cologne city (only Ehrenfeld, Nippes, and Chorweiler districts)
1998	61	Köln III	Cologne city (only Ehrenfeld, Nippes, and Chorweiler districts)
2002	96	Köln III	Cologne city (only Ehrenfeld, Nippes, and Chorweiler districts)
2005	96	Köln III	Cologne city (only Ehrenfeld, Nippes, and Chorweiler districts)
2009	96	Köln III	Cologne city (only Ehrenfeld, Nippes, and Chorweiler districts)
2013	95	Köln III	Cologne city (only Ehrenfeld, Nippes, and Chorweiler districts)
2017	95	Köln III	Cologne city (only Ehrenfeld, Nippes, and Chorweiler districts)
2021	95	Köln III	Cologne city (only Ehrenfeld, Nippes, and Chorweiler districts)
2025	94	Köln III	Cologne city (only Ehrenfeld, Nippes, and Chorweiler districts)

== Members ==
The constituency was first represented by Johannes Albers of the Christian Democratic Union (CDU) from 1949 to 1957, followed by fellow CDU members Hans Katzer until 1965 and Aenne Brauksiepe until 1969. It was won by the Social Democratic Party (SPD) in 1969 and represented by Hubert Weber. He was succeeded in 1980 by Konrad Gilges, who served from then until 2002. Rolf Mützenich was elected in 2002 and re-elected in 2005, 2009, 2013, 2017, and 2021. Mützenich became leader of the SPD's Bundestag group in 2019. In 2025 Katharina Dröge of Alliance 90/The Greens was elected

Election	Member	Party	%
1949	Johannes Albers	CDU	43.4
1953	Johannes Albers	CDU	50.0
1957	Hans Katzer	CDU	55.0
1961	Hans Katzer	CDU	46.5
1965	Aenne Brauksiepe	CDU	48.4
1969	Hubert Weber	SPD	53.3
1972	Hubert Weber	SPD	59.1
1976	Hubert Weber	SPD	53.3
1980	Konrad Gilges	SPD	52.1
1983	Konrad Gilges	SPD	50.5
1987	Konrad Gilges	SPD	48.5
1990	Konrad Gilges	SPD	47.4
1994	Konrad Gilges	SPD	48.1
1998	Konrad Gilges	SPD	52.1
2002	Rolf Mützenich	SPD	50.3
2005	Rolf Mützenich	SPD	50.5
2009	Rolf Mützenich	SPD	35.9
2013	Rolf Mützenich	SPD	39.3
2017	Rolf Mützenich	SPD	32.3
2021	Rolf Mützenich	SPD	29.9
2025	Katharina Dröge	Grüne	26.0

== Election results ==
=== 2025 election ===
Federal election (2025): Cologne III
Notes:	Blue background denotes the winner of the electorate vote. Pink background denotes a candidate elected from their party list. Yellow background denotes an electorate win by a list member, or other incumbent. A ✓ or ✗ denotes status of any incumbent, win or lose respectively.						
Party	Candidate	Votes	%	±%	Party votes	%	±%
Greens	Katharina Dröge	43,697	26.0	▼2.2	36,769	21.8	▼6.9
SPD	✗ Rolf Mützenich	43,307	25.8	▼4.1	33,496	19.9	▼5.9
CDU	Gisela Manderla	32,638	19.4	▲0.8	32,522	19.3	▲1.5
AfD	Jochen Haug	19,459	11.6	▲6.4	18,860	11.2	▲6.1
Left	Nadine Mai	18,806	11.2	▲5.7	27,502	16.3	▲9.9
BSW					7,190	4.3	
FDP	Maria Westphal	4,773	2.8	▼41	5,715	3.4	▼5.6
Volt	Franziska Weber	3,074	1.8	▲0.5	1,532	1.0	0.0
Tierschutzpartei					1,745	1.0	▼0.2
FW	Benjamin Krings	1,322	0.8	▲0.1	503	0.3	▼0.1
PARTEI				▼2.0	958	0.6	▼0.6
PdF	Heike Herden	745	0.4		335	0.2	▲0.2
Team Todenhöfer					415	0.2	▼1.0
dieBasis				▼1.2	311	0.2	▼0.9
BD					153	0.1	
MERA25					137	0.1	
MLPD				▼0.1	62	0.0	0.0
Values					48	0.0	
Pirates							▼0.3
Gesundheitsforschung							▼0.1
Humanists							▼0.1
ÖDP							▼0.1
Bündnis C							0.0
SGP							0.0
Informal votes		1,314			782		
Total valid votes		167,821			168,353		
Turnout		169,135	81.8	▲5.9			
SPD hold	Majority	390	0.2				

=== 2021 election ===
Federal election (2021): Cologne III
Notes:	Blue background denotes the winner of the electorate vote. Pink background denotes a candidate elected from their party list. Yellow background denotes an electorate win by a list member, or other incumbent. A ✓ or ✗ denotes status of any incumbent, win or lose respectively.						
Party	Candidate	Votes	%	±%	Party votes	%	±%
SPD	✓ Rolf Mützenich	46,149	29.9	▼2.4	39,901	25.8	▲1.2
Greens	Katharina Dröge	43,600	28.3	▲15.1	44,407	28.8	▲14.7
CDU	Gisela Manderla	28,674	18.6	▼9.0	27,485	17.8	▼6.6
FDP	Volker Görzel	10,708	6.9	▼0.2	13,845	9.0	▼2.3
Left	Michael Weisenstein	8,435	5.5	▼4.2	9,903	6.4	▼6.4
AfD	Jochen Haug	8,015	5.2	▼2.3	7,876	5.1	▼2.7
Team Todenhöfer					1,937	1.3	
Tierschutzpartei					1,846	1.2	▲0.4
PARTEI	Stefan Pott	3,143	2.0	▼0.4	1,784	1.2	▼0.2
dieBasis	Songül Schlürscheid	1,831	1.2		1,605	1.0	
Volt	Christopher Peterka	2,108	1.4		1,424	0.9	
FW	Norbert Theiß	1,100	0.7		684	0.4	▲0.2
Pirates					466	0.3	▼0.2
Independent	Christoph Goldbeck	189	0.1				
LIEBE					142	0.1	
du.					140	0.1	
Gesundheitsforschung					139	0.1	0.0
Humanists					135	0.1	0.0
ÖDP					121	0.1	0.0
V-Partei3					119	0.1	0.0
LfK					109	0.1	
NPD					73	0.0	▼0.1
MLPD	Reiner Dworschak	113	0.1	▼0.1	72	0.0	0.0
Independent	Maciej Podjaski	70	0.0				
Bündnis C					52	0.0	
PdF					48	0.0	
DKP					43	0.0	0.0
LKR					35	0.0	
SGP					11	0.0	0.0
Informal votes		1,107			840		
Total valid votes		154,135			154,402		
Turnout		155,242	75.9	▲1.9			
SPD hold	Majority	2,549	1.6	▼3.1			

=== 2017 election ===
Federal election (2017): Cologne III
Notes:	Blue background denotes the winner of the electorate vote. Pink background denotes a candidate elected from their party list. Yellow background denotes an electorate win by a list member, or other incumbent. A ✓ or ✗ denotes status of any incumbent, win or lose respectively.						
Party	Candidate	Votes	%	±%	Party votes	%	±%
SPD	✓ Rolf Mützenich	48,148	32.3	▼7.0	36,849	24.6	▼6.9
CDU	Gisela Manderla	41,106	27.6	▼5.3	36,500	24.4	▼6.2
Greens	Katharina Dröge	19,621	13.2	▲0.3	20,973	14.0	▼0.9
Left	Güldane Tokyürek	14,431	9.7	▲1.9	19,118	12.8	▲3.6
AfD	Stephan Boyens	11,249	7.5		11,731	7.8	▲4.6
FDP	Volker Görzel	10,599	7.1	▲4.9	16,850	11.3	▲6.8
PARTEI	Lukas Herrmann	3,632	2.4		2,074	1.4	▲0.6
AD-DEMOKRATEN					1,156	0.8	
Tierschutzpartei					1,144	0.8	
Pirates					704	0.5	▼2.2
DiB					468	0.3	
FW					317	0.2	▼0.1
BGE					294	0.2	
V-Partei³					213	0.1	
NPD					202	0.1	▼0.6
ÖDP					176	0.1	▼0.1
DM					170	0.1	
Die Humanisten					146	0.1	
Gesundheitsforschung					141	0.1	
Volksabstimmung					136	0.1	▼0.1
MLPD	Matthias Sauter	312	0.2		126	0.1	0.0
DKP					25	0.0	
SGP					12	0.0	0.0
Informal votes		1,531			1,104		
Total valid votes		149,098			149,525		
Turnout		150,629	74.0	▲3.8			
SPD hold	Majority	7,042	4.7	▼1.7			

=== 2013 election ===
Federal election (2013): Cologne III
Notes:	Blue background denotes the winner of the electorate vote. Pink background denotes a candidate elected from their party list. Yellow background denotes an electorate win by a list member, or other incumbent. A ✓ or ✗ denotes status of any incumbent, win or lose respectively.						
Party	Candidate	Votes	%	±%	Party votes	%	±%
SPD	✓ Rolf Mützenich	55,021	39.3	▲3.4	44,240	31.5	▲3.7
CDU	Gisela Manderla	45,999	32.9	▲4.1	42,902	30.6	▲5.5
Greens	Katharina Dröge	18,046	12.9	▼4.1	20,905	14.9	▼3.8
Left	Michael Weisenstein	10,883	7.8	▼0.8	12,960	9.2	▼0.9
Pirates	Thomas Hegenbarth	4,161	3.0		3,789	2.7	▲0.6
FDP	Volker Görzel	3,158	2.3	▼6.2	6,339	4.5	▼8.4
AfD					4,513	3.2	
NPD	Tibor Herzog	1,750	1.3	▼0.1	1,057	0.8	▼0.2
PARTEI					1,041	0.7	
PRO					488	0.3	
FW	Thomas Heilig	728	0.5		405	0.3	
BIG					381	0.3	
Nichtwahler					293	0.2	
ÖDP					263	0.2	0.0
Volksabstimmung					248	0.2	▲0.1
REP					151	0.1	▼0.2
Party of Reason					127	0.1	
RRP					67	0.0	▼0.1
BüSo	Stephan Hochstein	203	0.1		59	0.0	0.0
MLPD					57	0.0	0.0
PSG					34	0.0	0.0
Die Rechte					27	0.0	
Informal votes		1,765			1,368		
Total valid votes		139,949			140,346		
Turnout		141,714	70.2	▲2.0			
SPD hold	Majority	9,022	6.4	▼0.8			

=== 2009 election ===
Federal election (2009): Cologne III
Notes:	Blue background denotes the winner of the electorate vote. Pink background denotes a candidate elected from their party list. Yellow background denotes an electorate win by a list member, or other incumbent. A ✓ or ✗ denotes status of any incumbent, win or lose respectively.						
Party	Candidate	Votes	%	±%	Party votes	%	±%
SPD	✓ Rolf Mützenich	47,625	35.9	▼14.6	37,019	27.8	▼13.0
CDU	Artur Tybussek	38,093	28.7	▼1.7	33,367	25.1	0.0
Greens	Kerstin Müller	22,550	17.0	▲7.7	24,797	18.7	▲3.2
Left	Ursula Lötzer	11,390	8.6	▲3.8	13,540	10.2	▲4.0
FDP	Bettina Houben	11,187	8.4	▲4.5	17,225	13.0	▲3.3
Pirates					2,791	2.1	
NPD	Bernhard Blankenheim	1,788	1.3	▲0.5	1,231	0.9	▲0.2
Tierschutzpartei					847	0.6	▲0.2
RENTNER					456	0.3	
FAMILIE					473	0.4	▲0.1
ÖDP					201	0.2	
REP					367	0.3	▼0.1
RRP					257	0.2	
Volksabstimmung					153	0.1	0.0
Centre					58	0.0	0.0
DVU					57	0.0	
MLPD					53	0.0	0.0
PSG					26	0.0	0.0
BüSo					38	0.0	0.0
Informal votes		1,619			1,296		
Total valid votes		132,633			132,956		
Turnout		134,252	68.1	▼6.0			
SPD hold	Majority	9,532	7.2	▼12.9			

=== 2005 election ===
Federal election (2005): Cologne III
Notes:	Blue background denotes the winner of the electorate vote. Pink background denotes a candidate elected from their party list. Yellow background denotes an electorate win by a list member, or other incumbent. A ✓ or ✗ denotes status of any incumbent, win or lose respectively.						
Party	Candidate	Votes	%	±%	Party votes	%	±%
SPD	✓ Rolf Mützenich	71,575	50.5	▲0.2	57,935	40.8	▼3.7
CDU	Artur Tybussek	43,054	30.4	▲0.3	35,646	25.1	▼2.2
Greens	Kerstin Müller	13,196	9.3	▼2.5	21,883	15.4	▼0.7
Left	Jörg Detjen	6,809	4.8	▲2.8	8,809	6.2	▲4.2
FDP	Bettina Houben	5,569	3.9	▼1.0	13,712	9.7	▲1.9
NPD	Rolf Pawlowitz	1,233	0.9		973	0.7	▲0.5
GRAUEN					892	0.6	▲0.3
Tierschutzpartei					602	0.4	▲0.1
REP					578	0.4	▼0.2
Familie					402	0.3	▲0.2
Humanist	Christian Heinrici	289	0.2				
From Now on... Democracy Through Referendum					148	0.1	
PBC					121	0.1	
Socialist Equality Party					87	0.1	
BüSo					48	0.0	
Centre					44	0.0	
MLPD					50	0.0	0.0
Informal votes		750			545		
Total valid votes		141,725			141,930		
Turnout		142,475	74.2	▼0.6			
SPD hold	Majority	28,521	20.1				
