= Hans Katzer =

German politician (1919-1996)

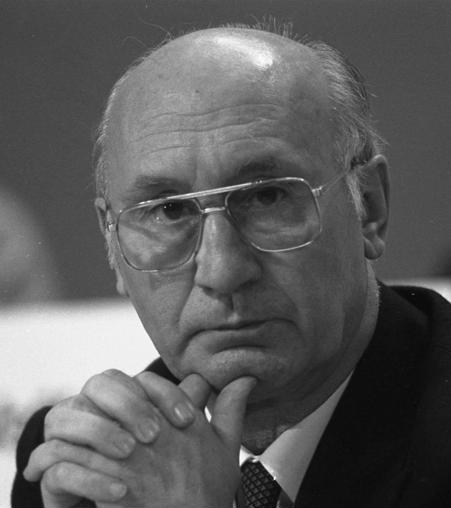
- Katzer in 1981 at the 30th Federal Party Congress of the CDU

Federal Minister for Labour and Social Affairs (West Germany)
- In office 26 October 1965 – 29 October 1969
- Chancellor: Ludwig Erhard; Kurt Georg Kiesinger
- Preceded by: Theodor Blank
- Succeeded by: Walter Arendt

Member of the Bundestag for Cologne III
- In office 15 October 1957 – 19 September 1965
- Preceded by: Johannes Albers
- Succeeded by: Aenne Brauksiepe

Member of the Bundestag for North Rhine-Westphalia
- In office 19 September 1965 – 4 November 1980

Member of the European Parliament
- In office 17 July 1979 – 23 July 1984
- Parliamentary group: European People's Party Group
- Constituency: Germany

Personal details
- Born: 31 January 1919 Cologne, Free State of Prussia, German Reich
- Died: 18 July 1996 (aged 77) Cologne, North Rhine-Westphalia, Germany
- Party: Christian Democratic Union
- Spouse: Elisabeth Kaiser (m. 1949)
- Children: 1

Military service
- Allegiance: Nazi Germany
- Branch/service: German Army
- Years of service: 1939-1945
- Rank: Leutnant

Hans Katzer (31 January 1919 – 18 July 1996) was a German politician of the Christian Democratic Union (CDU). He served as Federal Minister for Labour and Social Affairs of West Germany from 1965 to 1969 under Ludwig Erhard and Kurt Georg Kiesinger. During his time as minister, he helped improve war victims' pensions and helped pass the Labour Promotion Act (Arbeitsförderungsgesetz, AFG) (Note: Also referred to as the Employment Promotion Act.) in 1969, which was meant to upskill workers, push a more active labour market policy, and create the Federal Institute of Labour. It was replaced in 1997 with the Third Book of the Social Code upon the implementation of the Employment Promotion Reform Act.

He was also a Member of the Bundestag for Cologne III then North Rhine-Westphalia from 1957 to 1980.

== Early life ==
Katzer was born on 31 January 1919 in Cologne, the sixth child of the carpenter Karl Katzer and Rosa Katzer (née Franke). Karl had been a secretary of the Kolping Society since 1902 and later administrative director from 1927 to 1938. He was also a member of the council of Cologne for the Centre Party from 1919 to 1933. In 1929, he joined the Jugendbund Neudeutschland, a Catholic organization affiliated with the Centre Party. Due to his father's social status, he attended a Realgymnasium, dreaming of becoming an architect, but the seizure of power of the Nazi Party made his father lose his mandates and positions. He was forced to leave the Realgymnasium in 1935 due to this. He then did a commercial apprenticeship at a Cologne textile company, where he worked as part of the Reich Labour Service from 1938 to 1940, and attended the Higher Technical School for the Textile Industry in Mönchengladbach from 1939 to 1942.

His service in the Nazi German Army started in 1939. During the Battle of Moscow, on December 7, 1941, he received a serious injury in the form of a gunshot wound to the lung. He afterwards became a Leutnant, becoming an instructor in Metz during the German occupation of France. He was briefly a prisoner of war by the U.S. Army in May 1945, but was soon after released.

In 1945, upon recommendation of Johannes Albers, he was placed in the Cologne Federal Employment Agency. Katzer would later say Albers "introduced him to politics", who was also his political mentor in addition to Jakob Kaiser. That year he also joined the CDU in Cologne upon its founding. In 1952, the local elections for North Rhine-Westphalia happened and the CDU won 31 of the 66 seats of the council of Cologne, and he was elected a member alongside people like Ernst Schwering. During this time period he also became the co-editor of the magazines "Soziale Ordnung" and "Betriebsräte-Briefes".

== Political career ==
=== Member of Bundestag ===
Katzer won a seat in the Bundestag the 1957 West German federal election by direct mandate for Cologne III with 55.1% of the vote. The CDU also won a majority of the votes during this election. From 1965 to 1980 he was then elected to the Bundestag by state list for North Rhine-Westphalia.

In the Bundestag from 1969 to 1980 he was Deputy Federal Chairman of the CDU and also of the CDU/CSU parliamentary group. He was also a member of the CDU Executive Committee from 1960. He also became the Chairman of the Committee on Economic Property from 1961 to 1965.

He was sharply critical throughout his career of the distribution of ownership by means of production, stating in a 1970 Bundestag debate it was not good that at the time 71% of the capital was in the hands of the 1.7%, and states it had come from a bygone era of the post-war years.

He left the Bundestag in 1980.

=== Minister for Labour and Social Affairs ===
In 1965 he was promoted to being Minister for Labour and Social Affairs by Ludwig Erhard, a position he would hold during the grand coalition years of Kurt Georg Kiesinger until 1969.

In 1967, he threatened to resign alongside Gerhard Schröder if his budget was cut. That same year unemployment reached a record high in the within the last decade, and he said it was a "decisive goal" of his administration's policy. Unemployment would remain a huge issue during his time as minister, as endangered areas like the Saarland and the Bavarian Forest had significantly higher rates of unemployment. Prior to his term, miners were referred to the Ruhr for work, but they would later not move and layoff figures rose. Katzer also helped improve war victims' pensions.

In 1969 Katzer started pushing the Labour Promotion Act, which introduced a more active labour market policy in an attempt to fight unemployment and inferior employment. In addition, it created the Federal Institute of Labour to oversee this push and to upskill workers. The act was praised across the spectrum of parties after the preceding crisis of unemployment in 1967. After the 1969 West German federal election, he and his followers who were generally considered leftists, attempted to ally with SPD in an attempt to push his social policy but they were rejected by Helmut Schmidt.

=== CDA ===
In 1950 he became the Chief Executive Officer of the CDA Social Committees, which he headed until 1963. In April 1957, Kaiser suffered a massive stroke and so Katzer became the chief strategist for the Social Committees of the CDA in addition to his responsibilities as CEO. His long-term goals for that position at the time were to persuade Catholic bishops to switch their support from the Christian trade unions so that the more powerful DGB would consider an alliance with the CDA, create a relationship with the Catholic workers’ clubs, and unify the workers' wing of the CDU. In 1963 he became the chairman of the social committees, heading it until 1977 when Blüm took over.

His plans for his social committees largely corresponded with the ideas of the SPD, which included higher child benefit subsidies, an investment wage for employees, and more codetermination. He helped pass the Savings Premium Act and the issuance of shares to the general public at a discounted rate. In 1973, at a meeting with the social committees, Katzer called for a return of the Ahlen Program for the CDU, which called for the partial socialization of large-scale industry and strong co-determination rights. That same year he received a major defeat when his push for parity co-determination, or 50% of a board being workers, was rejected soundly by the CDU.

He was considered a political mentor to Norbert Blüm, who later led the same ministerial role as him. However, there was later a reported feud between them in the late 1970s when Blüm succeeded him as chairman of the CDU Social Committees, as Blüm's newer followers helped oust him but Katzer later said there was nothing between them.

=== Later political work ===
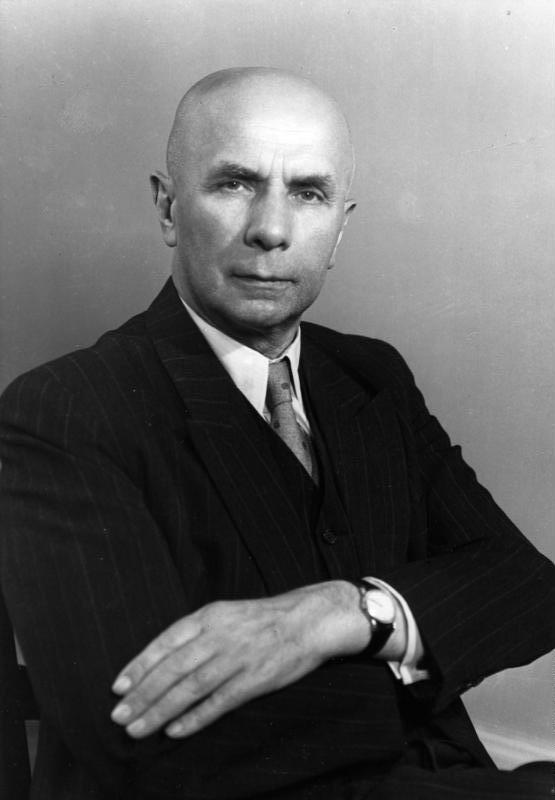
A portrait of Jakob Kaiser in 1950.

Katzer headed the Jakob Kaiser Foundation, and in this role pushed for German reunification. Starting in 1980 he also helped lead the German chapter of the European Union of Christian Democratic Workers alongside Alfred Bertrand.

From 1979 to 1984 he was a Member of the European Parliament from Germany for the European People's Party Group. He was on the Bureau of the European Parliament from 1979 to 1982, the Committee for Transport in 1979, and finally on the Delegation for relations with the People's Republic of China from 1983 to 1984. His stance on China as part of the delegation was generally positive, saying the country supported European unification and if peace was to be had there needed to be "a strong European Community and a strong China". His most important role in the Parliament was as one of the Vice-Presidents of the European Parliament from 1979 to 1982.

== Personal life ==
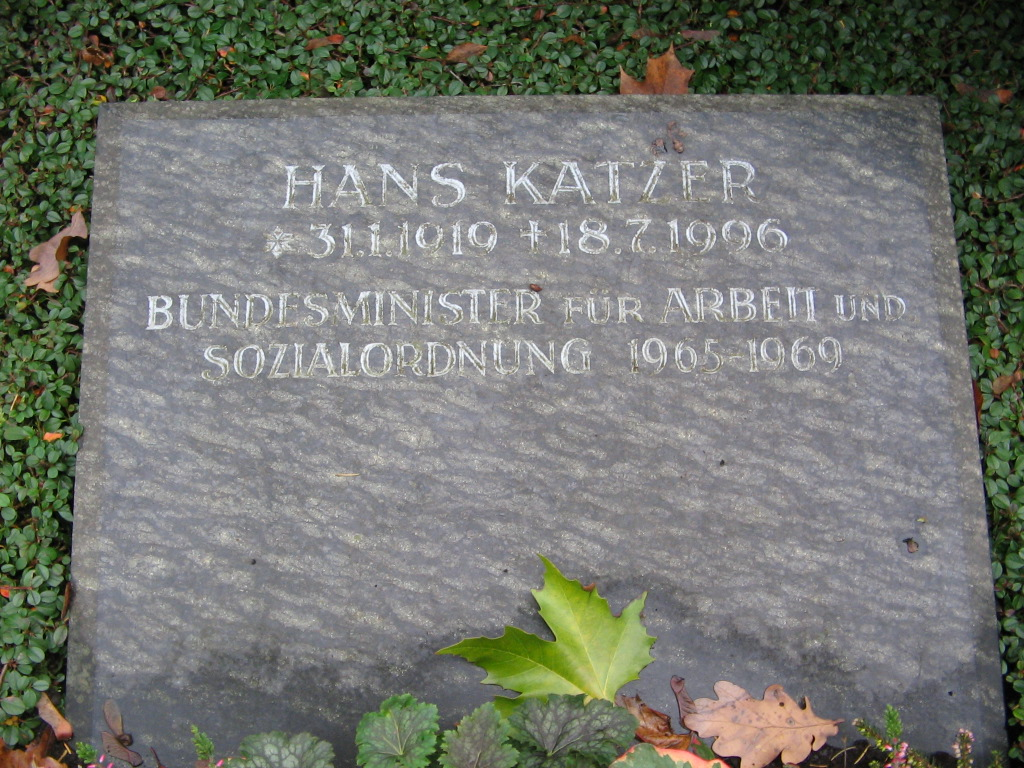
Katzer's grave at Melaten cemetery

In 1949 he married Elisabeth Kaiser, whom he would remain with and have one daughter. Their daughter, Marietheres Kreuz-Katzer, is a sociologist who has repeatedly decried the rise of the rise of the far-right in Germany. His father-in-law was Jakob Kaiser, who was the Federal Minister of All-German Affairs, and Katzer inherited much of his estate after Kaiser's death.

== Death ==
Katzer died on 18 July 1996 in Cologne, Germany. He had earlier had problems requiring gastrointestinal surgery. Helmut Kohl, then Chancellor of Germany, honoured him by calling him one of the most "outstanding personalities", and then Mayor of Cologne, Norbert Burger, called him "one of the first architects of our state".

== Honours and awards ==
On 19 January 1973, he was awarded the Grand Cross with Star and Sash on behalf of then President of West Germany, Gustav Heinemann. In 1987 he was awarded the Hans Böckler Prize, which was organized by the German Trade Union Confederation, and in 1988 he received the Ludger Westrick Prize. In 1989 he was awarded with the Order of Merit of North Rhine-Westphalia by Johannes Rau. For his work with the Social Committees of the CDA, he was made an honorary chairman after retiring from being chairman in 1977.
