= Berlin-Neukölln (electoral district) =

Federal electoral district of Germany

81 Berlin-Neukölln
- Electoral district for the Bundestag
- Berlin-Neukölln in 2025
- State: Berlin
- Population: 321,100 (2019)
- Electorate: 197,037 (2021)
- Area: 44.9 km^{2}

Current electoral district
- Created: 1990
- Party: The Left
- Member: Ferat Koçak
- Elected: 2025

Berlin-Neukölln is an electoral constituency (German: Wahlkreis) represented in the Bundestag. It elects one member via first-past-the-post voting. Under the current constituency numbering system, it is designated as constituency 81. It is located in southern Berlin, comprising the Neukölln borough.

Berlin-Neukölln was created for the inaugural 1990 federal election after German reunification. Since 2025, it has been represented by Ferat Koçak of The Left.

== Geography ==
Berlin-Neukölln is located in southern Berlin. As of the 2021 federal election, it is coterminous with the Neukölln borough.

== History ==
Berlin-Neukölln was created after German reunification in 1990. In the 1990 election, it was constituency 256 in the numbering system. In the 1994 and 1998 elections, it was number 257. In the 2005 through 2009 elections, it was number 83. In the 2013 through 2021 elections, it was number 82. From the 2025 election, it has been number 81. Its borders have not changed since its creation.

== Members ==
The constituency was first represented by Dankward Buwitt of the Christian Democratic Union (CDU) from 1990 to 1998. It was won by the Social Democratic Party (SPD) in 1998 and represented by Ditmar Staffelt. In 2009, Stefanie Vogelsang of the CDU was elected, and served a single term. Fritz Felgentreu regained the constituency for the SPD in the 2013 election, and was re-elected in 2017. He was succeeded by Hakan Demir in 2021. The constituency was won by Ferat Koçak of The Left in 2025, the first time the party had won a constituency in the former West.

Election	Member	Party	%
1990	Dankward Buwitt	CDU	51.2
1994	Dankward Buwitt	CDU	42.2
1998	Ditmar Staffelt	SPD	48.5
2002	Ditmar Staffelt	SPD	41.9
2005	Ditmar Staffelt	SPD	39.3
2009	Stefanie Vogelsang	CDU	30.8
2013	Fritz Felgentreu	SPD	32.3
2017	Fritz Felgentreu	SPD	26.8
2021	Hakan Demir	SPD	26.0
2025	Ferat Koçak	LINKE	30.0

== Election results ==
=== 2025 election ===
Federal election (2025): Berlin-Neukölln
Notes:	Blue background denotes the winner of the electorate vote. Pink background denotes a candidate elected from their party list. Yellow background denotes an electorate win by a list member, or other incumbent. A ✓ or ✗ denotes status of any incumbent, win or lose respectively.						
Party	Candidate	Votes	%	±%	Party votes	%	±%
Left	Ferat Koçak	43,413	30.0	▲17.0	36,686	25.3	▲13.4
CDU	Ottilie Klein	28,487	19.7	▲0.5	26,183	18.0	▲1.0
SPD	✗ Hakan Demir	27,266	18.8	▼7.0	22,853	15.7	▼8.2
AfD	Robert Eschricht	18,893	13.0	▲5.4	18,874	13.0	▲5.3
Greens	Andreas Audretsch	16,136	11.1	▼8.5	22,260	15.3	▼7.1
BSW					8,186	5.6	New
FDP	Max Klingsporn	2,791	1.9	▼4.4	4,033	2.8	▼4.3
Volt					976	0.7	▲0.2
PARTEI	Paul Nitsche	1,335	0.9	▼1.1	861	0.6	▼0.9
Team Todenhöfer	Jürgen Todenhöfer	2,135	1.5	▼0.3	704	0.5	▼2.0
FW	Marcel Kohn	831	0.6	New	425	0.3	▼0.4
MERA25					325	0.2	New
BD	Carsten Schanz	506	0.3	New	241	0.2	New
PdF					177	0.1	New
Independent	Christian Pape	128	0.1	New			
MLPD	Chaker Araki	262	0.2	▲0.1	110	0.1	0.0
BüSo					36	0.0	0.0
SGP					32	0.0	0.0
Informal votes		1,399			1,067		
Total valid votes		144,837			145,169		
Turnout		146,236	76.0	▲7.8			
Left gain from SPD	Majority	14,926	10.3				

=== 2021 election ===
Federal election (2021): Berlin-Neukölln
Notes:	Blue background denotes the winner of the electorate vote. Pink background denotes a candidate elected from their party list. Yellow background denotes an electorate win by a list member, or other incumbent. A ✓ or ✗ denotes status of any incumbent, win or lose respectively.						
Party	Candidate	Votes	%	±%	Party votes	%	±%
SPD	Hakan Demir	35,530	26.0	▼0.8	33,080	24.1	▲4.7
Greens	Andreas Audretsch	27,104	19.8	▲8.9	31,058	22.7	▲9.6
CDU	Christina Schwarzer	25,577	18.7	▼5.8	22,695	16.6	▼5.8
Left	Lucia Schnell	17,898	13.1	▼3.3	16,334	11.9	▼6.3
AfD	Marcel Goldammer	10,153	7.4	▼3.3	10,174	7.4	▼3.8
FDP	Janine Falkenberg	8,635	6.3	▲1.2	9,774	7.1	▼0.6
Tierschutzpartei	Ishai Rosenbaum	3,981	2.9		3,318	2.4	▲0.9
PARTEI	Thomas Tegtow	2,699	2.0	▼1.6	2,011	1.5	▼1.0
Team Todenhöfer	Havva Öruc	2,604	1.9		3,664	2.7	
dieBasis	Wilfried Meyer	1,347	1.0				
Die Grauen					1,178	0.9	▲0.2
FW					1,022	0.7	▲0.6
Volt					667	0.5	
Pirates					477	0.3	▼0.3
Gesundheitsforschung					290	0.2	0.0
du.					285	0.2	0.0
Independent	Ramona Cole	256	0.2				
Humanists					205	0.1	
Independent	Kilian Moser	201	0.1				
Independent	Thomas Lindlmair	192	0.1				
ÖDP					178	0.1	0.0
DKP					114	0.1	0.0
NPD					105	0.1	
V-Partei3					84	0.1	▼0.1
MLPD	Mohamad Tawil	170	0.1	▼0.1	83	0.1	▼0.1
LKR	Christian Lieberam	136	0.1		115	0.1	
BüSo					65	0.0	0.0
Independent	Christian Pape	62	0.0				
SGP					35	0.0	0.0
Informal votes		3,167			2,701		
Total valid votes		136,545			137,011		
Turnout		139,712	70.9	▲0.1			
SPD hold	Majority	8,426	6.2	▲3.9			

=== 2017 election ===
Federal election (2017): Berlin-Neukölln
Notes:	Blue background denotes the winner of the electorate vote. Pink background denotes a candidate elected from their party list. Yellow background denotes an electorate win by a list member, or other incumbent. A ✓ or ✗ denotes status of any incumbent, win or lose respectively.						
Party	Candidate	Votes	%	±%	Party votes	%	±%
SPD	✓ Fritz Felgentreu	37,777	26.8	▼5.6	27,520	19.5	▼6.8
CDU	Christina Schwarzer	34,593	24.5	▼6.0	31,592	22.3	▼6.7
Left	Judith Benda	23,204	16.4	▲4.7	25,752	18.2	▲3.9
Greens	Susanna Kahlefeld	15,480	11.0	▼0.7	18,446	13.0	▼0.8
AfD	Frank-Christian Hansel	15,105	10.7	▲7.7	15,904	11.2	▲7.0
FDP	Marcus Jensen	7,255	5.1	▲3.8	10,891	7.7	▲4.7
PARTEI	Antonietta Miro	5,048	3.6	▲1.8	3,490	2.5	▲1.0
Tierschutzpartei					2,171	1.5	
Pirates					964	0.7	▼3.4
Die Grauen		1,191	0.8		919	0.6	
DiB					724	0.5	
BGE					676	0.5	
DM					366	0.3	
MIETERPARTEI		636	0.5				
du.					335	0.2	
Menschliche Welt					270	0.2	
NPD		262	0.2	▼2.1			
Gesundheitsforschung					248	0.2	
FW					220	0.2	▼0.4
ÖDP					208	0.1	0.0
V-Partei³					198	0.1	
MLPD		294	0.2	▲0.1	196	0.1	0.0
BüSo	Jonathan Thron	260	0.2	0.0	111	0.1	0.0
DKP					99	0.1	
B*					83	0.1	
SGP					30	0.0	0.0
Informal votes		2,448			2,140		
Total valid votes		141,105			141,413		
Turnout		143,553	70.8	▲2.4			
SPD hold	Majority	3,184	2.3	▲0.6			

=== 2013 election ===
Federal election (2013): Berlin-Neukölln
Notes:	Blue background denotes the winner of the electorate vote. Pink background denotes a candidate elected from their party list. Yellow background denotes an electorate win by a list member, or other incumbent. A ✓ or ✗ denotes status of any incumbent, win or lose respectively.						
Party	Candidate	Votes	%	±%	Party votes	%	±%
SPD	Fritz Felgentreu	44,528	32.3	▲5.0	36,211	26.2	▲4.9
CDU	Christina Schwarzer	42,092	30.6	▼0.2	40,038	29.0	▲3.1
Left	Ruben Lehnert	16,144	11.7	▼0.6	19,677	14.3	▲0.3
Greens	Anja Kofbinger	16,126	11.7	▼2.9	19,156	13.9	▼3.7
Pirates	Anne Helm	6,094	4.4		5,654	4.1	▲0.7
AfD	Sari-Christoph Saleh	4,140	3.0		5,832	4.2	
NPD	Jan Sturm	3,094	2.2	▼0.4	2,627	1.9	▼0.1
PARTEI	Georg Friedrich Kammerer	2,420	1.8		2,060	1.5	
FDP	Sebastian Kluckert	1,861	1.4	▼7.6	4,122	3.0	▼9.8
FW		794	0.6		689	0.5	
BIG					617	0.4	
PRO					454	0.3	
ÖDP					255	0.2	0.0
REP					216	0.2	▼0.3
BüSo		222	0.2		126	0.1	▼0.1
MLPD		208	0.2	0.0	143	0.1	0.0
PSG					80	0.1	0.0
Informal votes		3,102			2,868		
Total valid votes		137,723			137,957		
Turnout		140,825	68.5	▲1.3			
SPD gain from CDU	Majority	2,436	1.7				

=== 2009 election ===
Federal election (2009): Berlin-Neukölln
Notes:	Blue background denotes the winner of the electorate vote. Pink background denotes a candidate elected from their party list. Yellow background denotes an electorate win by a list member, or other incumbent. A ✓ or ✗ denotes status of any incumbent, win or lose respectively.						
Party	Candidate	Votes	%	±%	Party votes	%	±%
CDU	Stefanie Vogelsang	39,618	30.8	▼5.8	33,469	25.9	▼2.5
SPD	Fritz Felgentreu	35,168	27.3	▼12.0	27,639	21.4	▼13.3
Greens	Anja Kofbinger	18,805	14.6	▲5.1	22,698	17.6	▲4.5
Left	Ruben Lehnert	15,852	12.3	▲5.6	17,986	13.9	▲5.2
FDP	Andreas Lück	11,468	8.9	▲5.3	16,486	12.8	▲4.2
Pirates					4,339	4.3	
NPD	Jan Sturm	3,356	2.6	▲0.6	2,554	2.0	▲0.3
Tierschutzpartei					2,066	1.6	
Independent	Yusuf Bayrak	1,924	1.5				
Independent	Annette Köhn	1,305	1.0				
REP					611	0.5	▼0.3
DIE VIOLETTEN					394	0.3	
Independent	Sven Buchmann	388	0.3				
Independent	Bülent Yorulmaz	316	0.2				
ÖDP					261	0.2	
BüSo					209	0.2	▲0.1
DVU					158	0.1	
DKP	Rainer Perschewski	280	0.2		150	0.1	
PSG					128	0.1	0.0
MLPD	Andrew Schlüter	218	0.2	0.0	108	0.1	0.0
Informal votes		3,915			3,357		
Total valid votes		128,698			129,256		
Turnout		132,613	67.2	▼6.9			
CDU gain from SPD	Majority	4,450	3.5				

=== 2005 election ===
Federal election (2005):Berlin-Neukölln
Notes:	Blue background denotes the winner of the electorate vote. Pink background denotes a candidate elected from their party list. Yellow background denotes an electorate win by a list member, or other incumbent. A ✓ or ✗ denotes status of any incumbent, win or lose respectively.						
Party	Candidate	Votes	%	±%	Party votes	%	±%
SPD	✓ Ditmar Staffelt	55,264	39.3	▼2.6	48,866	34.6	▼1.7
CDU	Eberhard Diepgen	51,444	36.6	0.0	40,087	28.4	▼5.4
Greens	Sibyll-Anka Klotz	13,381	9.5	▲0.2	18,438	13.1	▼0.6
Left	Evrim Baba	9,375	6.7	▲3.2	12,260	8.7	▲5.5
FDP	Klaus-Dieter Humpich	5,076	3.6	▼2.5	12,035	8.5	▲1.5
GRAUEN					3,766	2.7	▲1.3
NPD	Eckart Bräuniger	2,832	2.0		2,370	1.7	▲1.3
PARTEI	Rolf Kohnen	1,480	1.1		868	0.6	
REP					1,052	0.7	▼0.2
Feminist					702	0.5	▲0.1
Independent	Aly Abdelwahab	537	0.4				
APPD	Frank Heinlein	490	0.3		247	0.2	
Independent	Hermann Barges	424	0.3				
MLPD	Barbara Riemer	296	0.2		172	0.1	
SGP					112	0.1	
BüSo					92	0.1	0.0
Informal votes		3,625			3,157		
Total valid votes		140,599			141,067		
Turnout		144,224	74.0	▼1.1			
SPD hold	Majority	3,820	2.7				
