= Brauksiepe =

Brauksiepe is a surname. Notable people with the surname include:

- Aenne Brauksiepe (1912–1997), German politician
- Ralf Brauksiepe (born 1967), German politician
