= Rolf Mützenich =

German politician (born 1959)

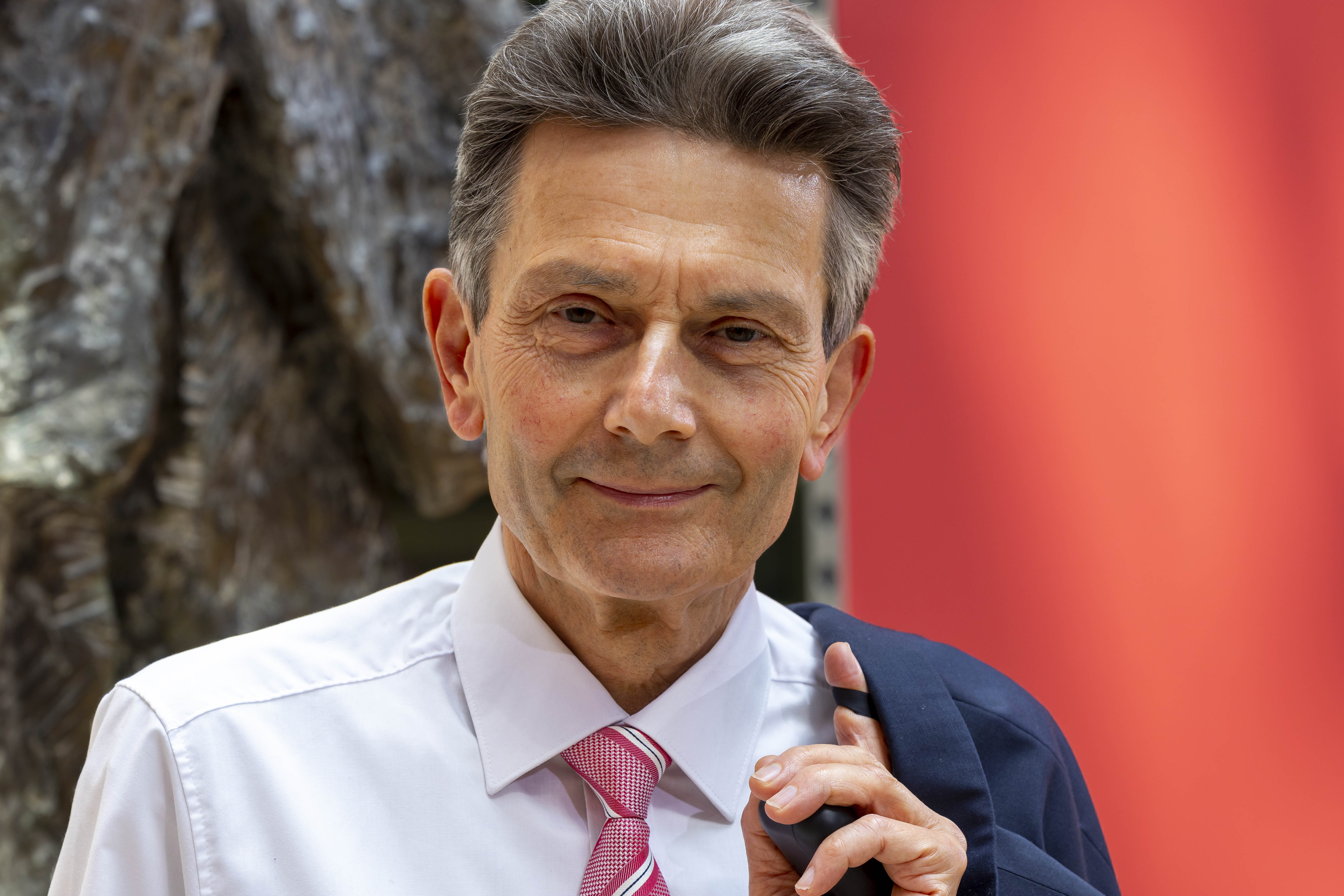
- Mützenich in 2023

Leader of the Social Democratic Party in the Bundestag
- In office 4 June 2019 – 26 February 2025; Acting: 4 June 2019 – 24 September 2019
- Chief Whip: Carsten Schneider; Katja Mast
- Deputy: See list: Sören Bartol; Bärbel Bas; Gabriela Heinrich; Katja Mast; Matthias Miersch; Achim Post; Dirk Wiese; Sönke Rix; Dagmar Schmidt; Verena Hubertz; Detlef Müller
- Preceded by: Andrea Nahles
- Succeeded by: Lars Klingbeil

Member of the Bundestag for Cologne III
- Incumbent
- Assumed office 17 October 2002
- Preceded by: Konrad Gilges

Personal details
- Born: Rolf Heinrich Mützenich; 25 June 1959 (age 67) Cologne, North Rhine-Westphalia, West Germany (now Germany)
- Party: Social Democratic Party (1975–)
- Education: University of Bremen
- Occupation: Politician; Civil Servant

Rolf Heinrich Mützenich (born 25 June 1959) is a German politician of the Social Democratic Party of Germany (SPD) who served as leader of the SPD group in the Bundestag from June 2019 until February 2025.

== Early life and education ==
Mützenich was born on 25 June 1959 in Cologne and studied political science and history at the University of Bremen and earned his PhD in 1991.

== Early career ==
After completing his doctorate, Mützenich joined the State Ministry of Labour, Health and Social Affairs of North Rhine-Westphalia. From 1993 he worked as a research assistant for the SPD parliamentary group in the State Parliament of North Rhine-Westphalia until he returned to the State Ministry of Social Affairs in 1998, under the leadership of minister Ilse Brusis. From 2001 to 2002 he served as chief of staff to the President of the North Rhine-Westphalian State Parliament, Ulrich Schmidt.

== Political career ==
Mützenich entered in the SPD in 1975. He has been a member of the German Bundestag since the 2002 national elections, representing Cologne. From 2002 until 2013, he served on the Committee on Foreign Affairs. He was also a member of the Subcommittee on Disarmament, Arms Control and Non-Proliferation from 2006 until 2009.

In addition to his committee assignments, Mützenich has in the past chaired the German Iranian Parliamentary Friendship Group (2006–2009) and the German-Japanese Parliamentary Friendship Group (2010–2013).

Within the SPD parliamentary group, Mützenich belongs to the Parliamentary Left, a left-wing movement. He has been part of internal working groups on the Middle East (2005–2009) and Afghanistan and Pakistan (2009–2013). From 2009 until 2013, he served as the group's spokesperson on foreign policy. He later became deputy chairman of the parliamentary group under the leadership of successive chairpersons Thomas Oppermann (2013–2017) and Andrea Nahles (2017–2019).

In the negotiations to form a coalition government under the leadership of Chancellor Angela Merkel following the 2017 federal elections, Mützenich was part of the working group on foreign policy, led by Ursula von der Leyen, Gerd Müller and Sigmar Gabriel.

In June 2019, Mützenich became acting chairman of the SPD parliamentary group after the startling demission of Andrea Nahles.

Editorial writers saw Mützenich as chairman responsible for scaring away several qualified candidates for the position of secretary of defense in the Scholz cabinet, like Fritz Felgentreu and Hans-Peter Bartels, which led to Christine Lambrecht ending up in the position after the 2021 elections.

== Other activities ==
- Business Forum of the Social Democratic Party of Germany, Member of the Political Advisory Board (since 2020)
- Friedrich Ebert Foundation, Member of the Board
- Max Planck Institute for the Study of Societies (MPIfG), Member of the Board of Trustees (since 2009)
- Zeitschrift für Außen- und Sicherheitspolitik, Member of the Advisory Board (since 2009)
- German United Services Trade Union (ver.di), Member
- Development and Peace Foundation (SEF), Member of the Board of Trustees (2013–2019)
- German Institute for International and Security Affairs (SWP), Member of the Council (2009–2014)
- German-Iranian Society, Member of the Advisory Board (2009–2011)

== Political positions ==
Over the years, Mützenich has been a vocal critic of the deployment of German forces in Afghanistan.

In 2015, Mützenich criticized SPD "rapprochement romantics" in Germany's relationship with Russia and warned against the "misconception that old-style Ostpolitik was possible following the annexation of Crimea." In 2018, he was one of the most important critics of the decision made by Foreign Minister Heiko Maas to expel four Russian diplomats over the nerve agent attack on Sergei Skripal and his daughter Yulia, describing that the expulsion as “too hasty“ and saying there was still no conclusive proof that the Russian government was behind the poisoning.

When Germany entered the process of phasing out its aging fleet of Tornado fighter jets to fulfill its nuclear sharing obligations with the U.S., Mützenich called for an American nuclear withdrawal in a 2020 interview with newspaper Der Tagesspiegel. According to Mützenich, "nuclear weapons on German territory do not heighten our security, just the opposite", especially during the presidency of Donald Trump.

Due to his Russia policy and his attitude towards NATO Rolf Mützenich was repeatedly referred to as a "Russlandversteher" or "Putinversteher", which he always denies.

Party political offices
Preceded by Andrea Nahles	Leader of the Social Democratic Party in the Bundestag; 2019–present	Incumbent
