= Konrad Gilges =

German politician

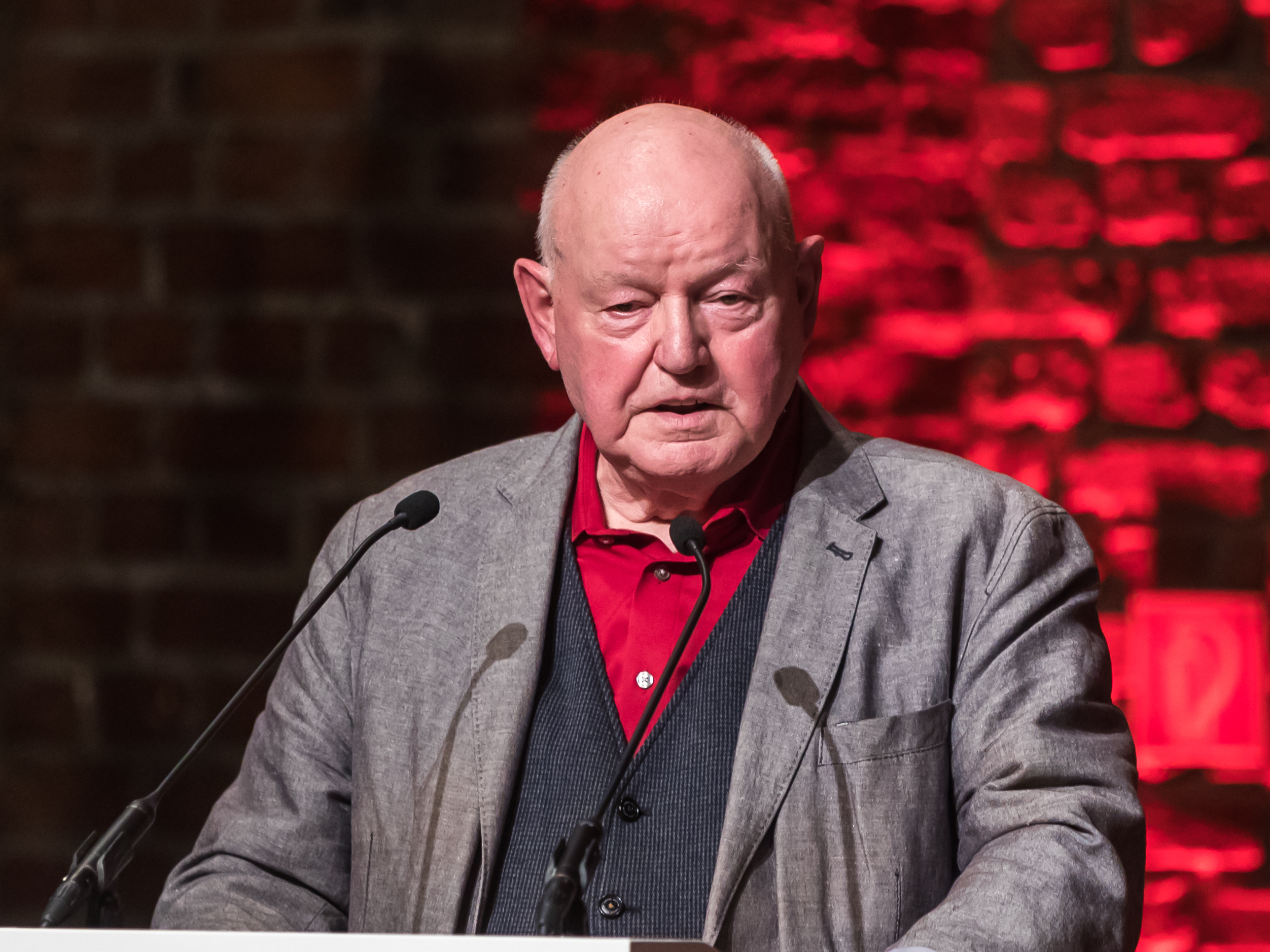
- Gilges in 2021

Member of the Bundestag for Cologne III
- In office 4 November 1980 – 17 October 2002
- Preceded by: Hubert Weber
- Succeeded by: Rolf Mützenich

Personal details
- Born: 13 February 1941 (age 84); Cologne, North Rhine-Westphalia, Germany
- Political party: Social Democratic Party
- Occupation: Politician

Konrad Gilges (born 13 February 1941) is a German politician of the Social Democratic Party of Germany (SPD) and former member of the German Bundestag.

== Career ==
From 1973 to 1979, he was the Federal Chairman of the Socialist Youth of Germany – The Falcons and from 1977 to 1979, he was the Chairman of the German Federal Youth Ring. In 2021, Gilges and Lisa Herzog were awarded the Hans Böckler Prize of the City of Cologne.
