= Dankward Buwitt =

German politician (born 1939)

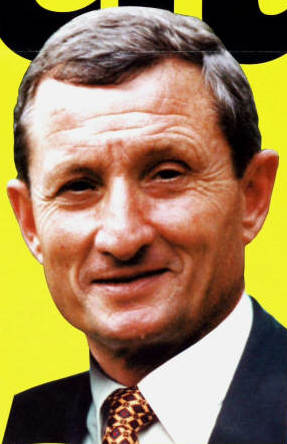
- Photograph of Dankward Buwitt in a candidate poster for the 1998 federal election

Member of the Bundestag; from Berlin
- In office 20 December 1990 – 17 October 2002
- Preceded by: Constituency established
- Succeeded by: Multi-member district
- Constituency: Berlin-Neukölln (1990–1998); State list (1998–2002)

Personal details
- Born: 6 July 1939 (age 87) Berlin, Germany
- Party: Christian Democratic Union

Dankward Buwitt (born 1939) is a German politician of the Christian Democratic Union (CDU) and former member of the German Bundestag.

== Career ==
Buwitt joined the CDU in 1968 and was local chairman of the Neukölln chapter from 1974 to 1991. He was also district chairman in Neukölln from 1981 to 1997. From 1991 to 1993, he was state treasurer. In 1975 he was elected for the first time to the Berlin House of Representatives, of which he was a member until 1991. In the 1990 federal elections, Buwitt was elected to parliament in constituency 256 (Berlin-Neukölln). He was deputy chairman of the Finance Committee as well as deputy member of the Defence Committee and, since October 1992, of the Special Committee on European Union Affairs. He was reelected to the constituency in the 1994 Bundestag elections. He did not stand for reelection in the 2002 Bundestag elections.
