= Irene Mihalic =

German politician (born 1976)

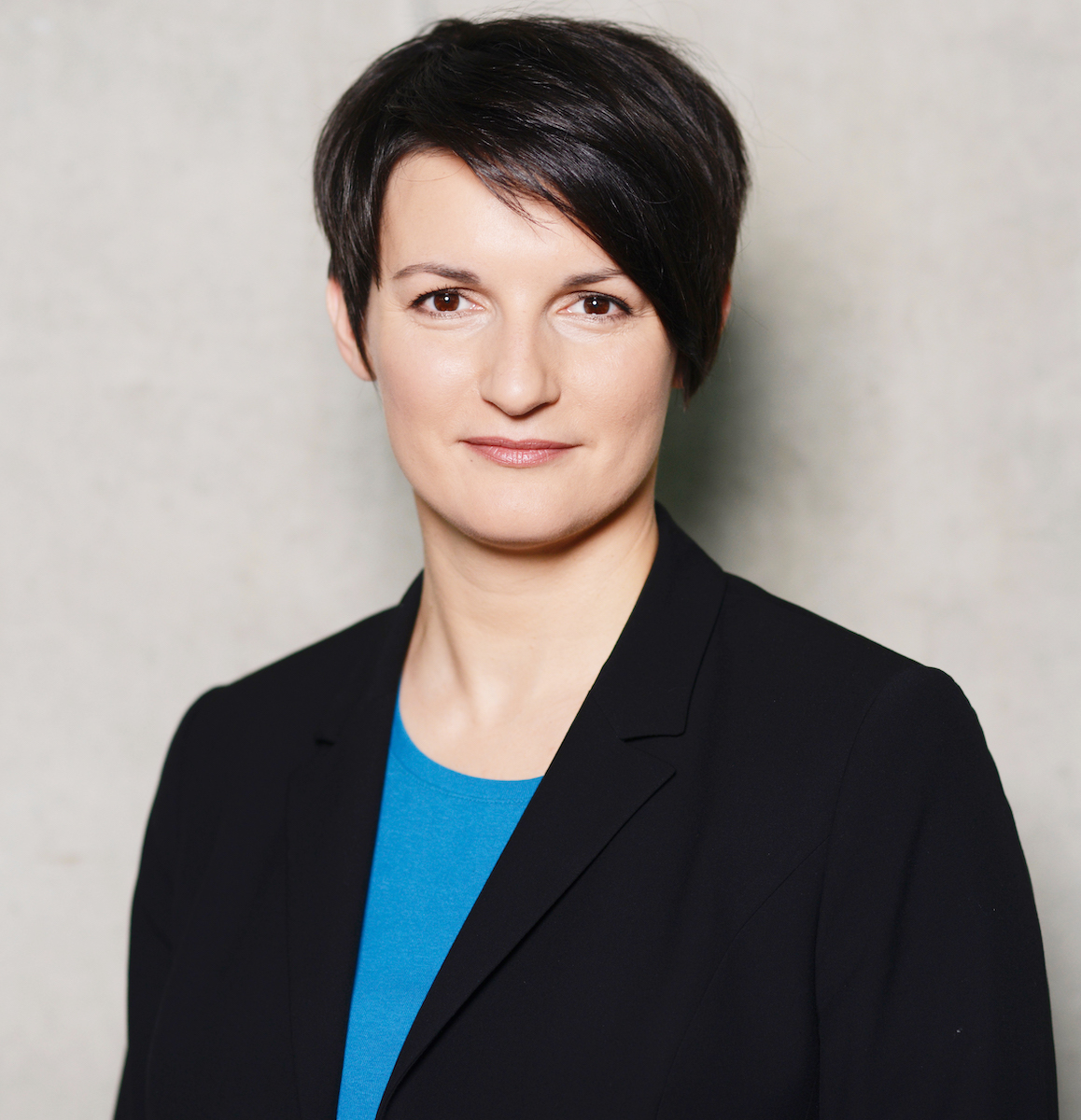
- Mihalic in 2016

Chief Whip of the Alliance '90/The Greens in the Bundestag
- Incumbent
- Assumed office 7 December 2021
- Leader: Britta Haßelmann; Katharina Dröge
- Preceded by: Britta Haßelmann

Member of the Bundestag
- Incumbent
- Assumed office 22 October 2013
- Constituency: North Rhine-Westphalia

Personal details
- Born: 17 November 1976 (age 49) Waldbröl, West Germany
- Party: Greens
- Children: 1
- Education: Ruhr University Bochum

Irene Mihalic (born 17 November 1976) is a German politician of Alliance 90/The Greens from Gelsenkirchen. A former police officer, Mihailic has been a member of the Bundestag since 2013.

== Early life and education ==
Mihalic was born in Waldbröl, the youngest of three siblings. Her parents are from Croatia; they came to Germany in the 1960s.

Mihalic trained as a police officer and studied at the Fachhochschule für öffentliche Verwaltung Nordrhein-Westfalen (University of Applied Sciences for Public Administration North Rhine-Westphalia), graduating as a Diplom-Verwaltungswirt (FH). She studied criminology and police science at the Ruhr University Bochum, graduating with an M.A. degree in 2016. In 2018, she received her doctorate from the Law Faculty of the Ruhr-University Bochum. Her dissertation was published under the title Police Operations, Crime and Space – A Criminal Geographical Analysis Based on Police Operations Data and Social Structure Data of the City of Gelsenkirchen.

== Early career ==
From 1993 Mihalic worked as a police officer, from 2007 she worked for the Cologne Police Headquarters. At the end of the 2000s, she acted, together with her colleague Dennis Melerski, in the German reality TV series Achtung Kontrolle! – Einsatz für die Ordnungshüter.

== Political career ==
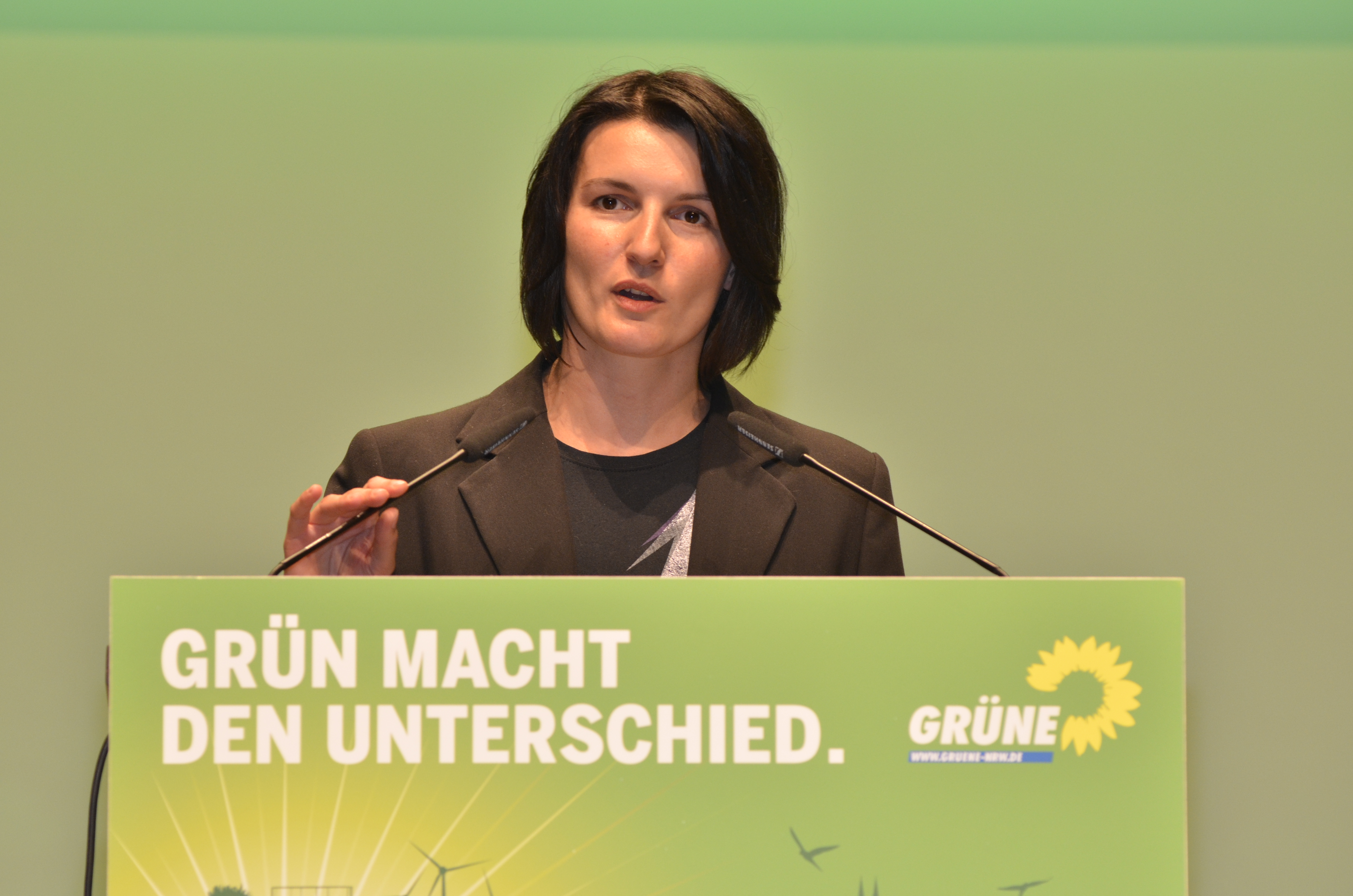
Mihalic in 2012

=== Career in local politics ===
Mihalic has been a member of Alliance 90/The Greens since 2006. She was a member of Gelsenkirchen City Council from 2009 until the end of 2013. Since 2010, she has been a member of the board of Bündnis 90/Die Grünen Nordrhein-Westfalen.

=== Member of the German Parliament, 2013–present ===
In the 2013 federal elections, Mihalic ran in the Gelsenkirchen constituency and in 7th place on the North Rhine-Westphalia state list of Alliance 90/The Greens. She succeeded in entering the Bundestag via the state list. In the 2017 Bundestag elections, Mihalic again entered the Bundestag, this time in 5th place on the NRW Alliance 90/The Greens state list.

Mihalic has been a member of the Committee on Internal Affairs since 2013 and her parliamentary group’s spokeswoman for internal affairs since 2016. Initially, she acted as spokeswoman for internal security in the Alliance 90/The Greens parliamentary group and, until 2017, as chairwoman of the Committee on Internal Affairs. She is also part of the Committee for the Scrutiny of Acoustic Surveillance of the Private Home. Since 2022, she has been a member of the Parliamentary Oversight Panel (PKGr), which provides parliamentary oversight of Germany’s intelligence services BND, BfV and MAD.

From 2018, Mihalic chaired the investigative committee on the attack at Breitscheidplatz in Berlin. Previously, she was chairwoman of the NSU investigative committee of the Bundestag (November 2015 to June 2017) and chairwoman of the investigative committee on the Edathy affair (July 2014 to December 2015).

Mihalic is also an alternate member of the Committee on Legal Affairs and Consumer Protection. In addition to her committee assignments, she has been serving as deputy chairwoman of the Parliamentary Friendship Group for Relations with the Northern Adriatic States.

In the negotiations to form a so-called traffic light coalition of the Social Democratic Party (SPD), the Green Party and the Free Democratic Party (FDP) following the 2021 German elections, Mihalic was part of her party's delegation in the working group on homeland security, civil rights and consumer protection, co-chaired by Christine Lambrecht, Konstantin von Notz and Wolfgang Kubicki.

In the negotiations to form a coalition government under the leadership of Minister-President of North Rhine-Westphalia Hendrik Wüst following the 2022 state elections, Mihalic was part of her party’s delegation.

== Political positions ==
As a domestic policy spokeswoman and police officer, Mihalic's parliamentary mandate focuses on right-wing extremism (e.g. "Reichsbürger"), Islamism, weapons law, the establishment of security authorities in Germany and Europe, civil defense and emergency management and civil service law. She is also a spokesperson for LEAP (Law Enforcement Against Prohibition) Deutschland e. V., which promotes the legalization of drugs.

== Other activities ==
- Amnesty International, Member
- Greenpeace, Member
- Institut Solidarische Moderne (ISM), Member
- International Police Association (IPA), Member

== Personal life ==
Mihalic is married to Melerski. She has been the mother of a son since 2015. Mihalic has no religion.
