= Stefanie Vogelsang =

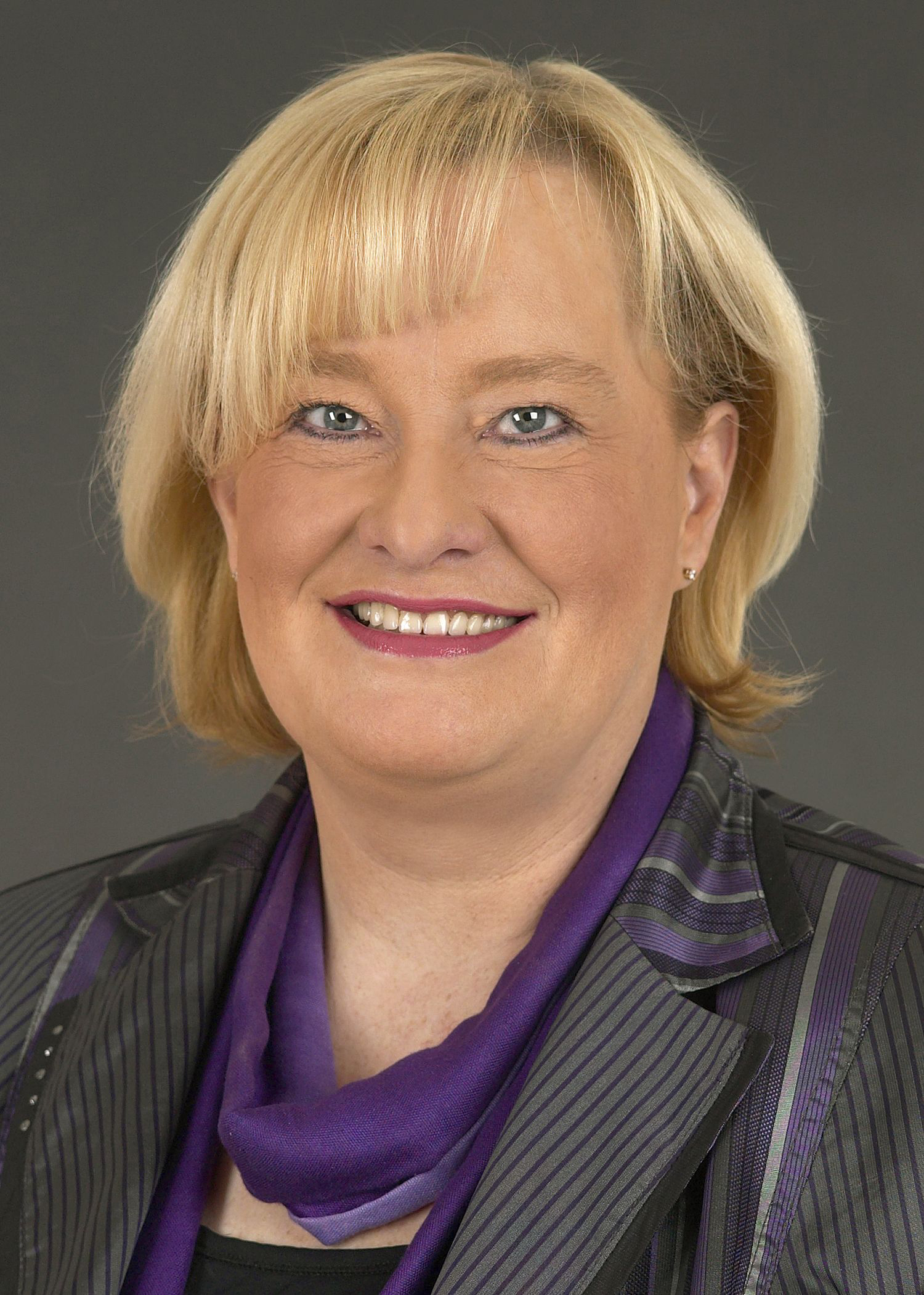
- Vogelsang in 2010

Member of the Bundestag; for Berlin-Neukölln
- In office 27 October 2009 – 22 October 2013
- Preceded by: Eva Högl
- Succeeded by: Fritz Felgentreu

Personal details
- Born: 25 April 1966 (age 60) Bielefeld, West Germany
- Party: Christian Democratic Union
- Children: 2
- Education: University of Münster; University of Bonn

Stefanie Vogelsang (born 25 April 1966) is a German politician from the Christian Democratic Union (CDU) and former member of the Bundestag (2009–2013). She was deputy mayor of the Berlin-Neukölln district, a city councillor, deputy chairwoman of the CDU Berlin state association, and chairwoman of the CDU Neukölln district association.

== Early life and education ==
Vogelsang grew up in Bielefeld and began studying political science and economics in Münster and Bonn, but did not complete her studies.

== Political career ==
She joined the CDU in 1989. She worked for several members of the German Bundestag in Bonn and became an advisor to the German Bundestag in 1990. She was chairwoman of the CDU Gropiusstadt local branch and, from 2005 to 2009, chairwoman of the CDU Neukölln district branch. Vogelsang lost the district chairmanship when she was unexpectedly not re-elected by the district party conference. Her successor was her colleague from the district council Michael Büge.

== Berlin-Neukölln District Office ==
From 1995 to 1999, Stefanie Vogelsang was District Councillor for Health and Social Affairs in the Neukölln District Office. She was not renominated in 1999. From 1 December 2001 to 9 June 2009, she was Deputy Mayor of Neukölln. From 1 December 2001 to 26 October 2006, she was District Councillor for the Department of Construction, and from 27 October 2006 to 9 June 2009, she was District Councillor for Citizen Services and Health in Neukölln. A recall motion by the SPD, Greens, PDS, FDP, and Grey Panthers in 2008 narrowly failed. Her term of office ultimately ended with her removal from office on 9 June 2009. The former CDU parliamentary group leader, Falko Liecke, then took over her position as District Councillor.

== Bundestag career ==
In the run-up to the federal election campaign, there was intense internal party turmoil surrounding Vogelsang's candidacy. After she was removed as head of the local party, she was accused of errors in party finances, which culminated in another party conference that called on her to withdraw her candidacy.

After Vogelsang persisted in her candidacy, she was elected to the Bundestag in the 2009 German federal election as the direct candidate for the Neukölln constituency, receiving 30% of the first vote. In the Bundestag, she was a full member of the Subcommittee on European Union Affairs, the Petitions Committee, and the Health Committee, and a substitute member of the Main Committee. Vogelsang delivered her first speech in the German Bundestag on 17 December 2009.

She is a member of the European Union Parliamentary Group of the German Bundestag European Union Parliamentary Group German Bundestag.

She was not nominated again in the Neukölln constituency for the 2013 German federal election. Her attempt to secure the direct candidacy in the Berlin-Friedrichshain-Kreuzberg – Prenzlauer Berg East constituency (constituency 83) failed: at the decisive meeting, she received only 3 out of 23 votes cast.

== Political positions ==
Vogelsang repeatedly called for cuts in social benefits for parents whose children frequently skipped school. In a letter to Labor Minister Ursula von der Leyen (CDU), Vogelsang proposed cuts of up to 30%. She had previously campaigned during the federal election campaign on a proposal to reduce or eliminate child benefits for parents of truants.

During her tenure as district councilor for construction, she used building regulations to prevent the construction of a mosque in Neukölln. She feared dubious backers were behind the project.

In the B.Z. newspaper , Vogelsang, during her time as a city councillor, denounced the existence of no-go areas in Neukölln. This led to a dispute with district mayor Heinz Buschkowsky (SPD).

== Personal life ==
Vogelsang is married, has two children, and lives in Neukölln.

== See also ==
- List of members of the 17th Bundestag
