= Gisela Manderla =

German politician

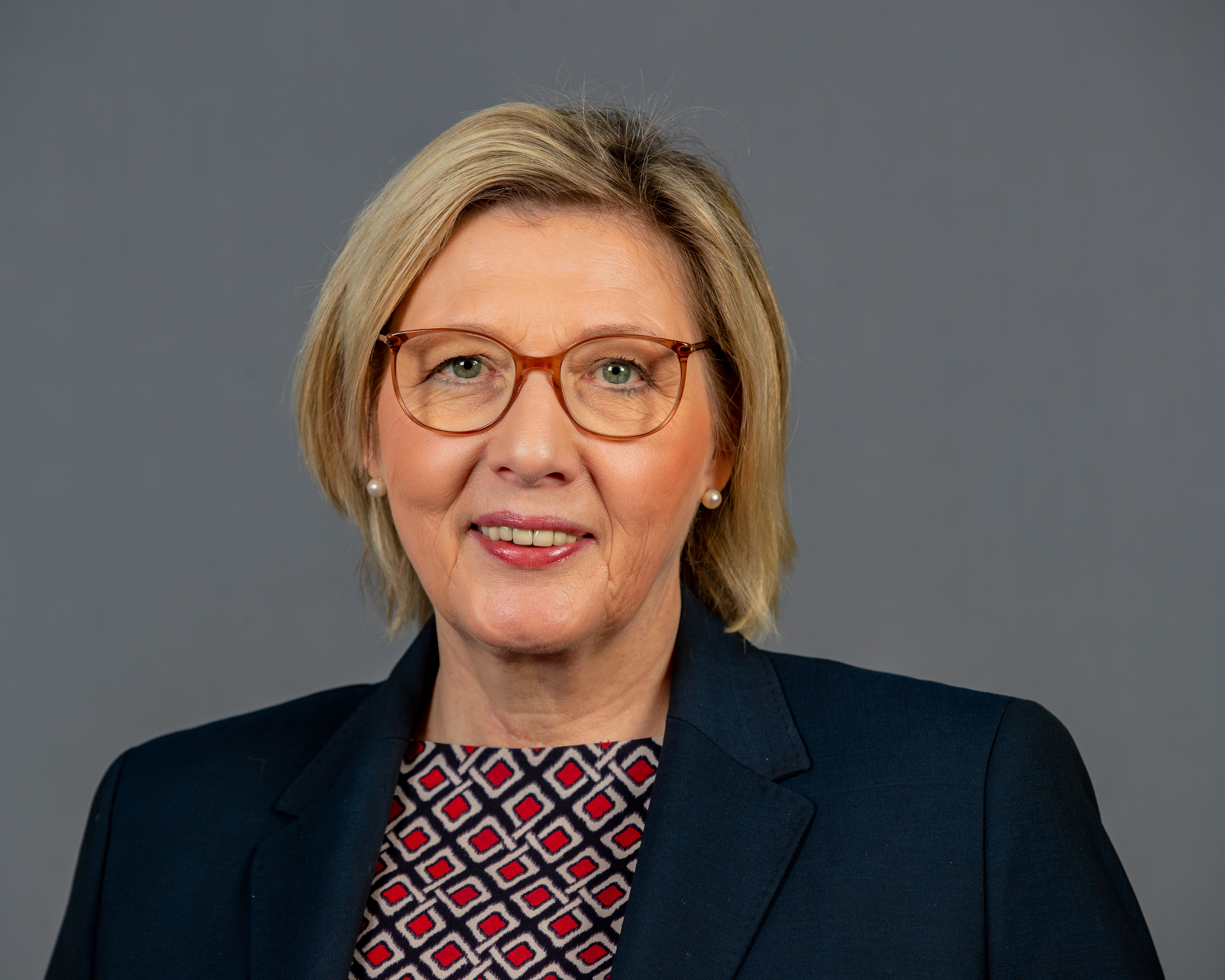
- Gisela Manderla in 2020

Member of the Bundestag
- In office 2018–2021
- In office 2013–2017

Personal details
- Born: 11 February 1958 (age 68) Düsseldorf-Kaiserswerth, West Germany (now Germany)
- Party: CDU

Gisela Manderla (born 11 February 1958) is a German politician of the Christian Democratic Union (CDU) who served as a member of the Bundestag from the state of North Rhine-Westphalia from 2013 to 2017 and again from 2018 to 2021.

== Political career ==
Manderla became a member of the Bundestag in 2018. She was a member of the Committee on Foreign Affairs and the Defence Committee. She always contested the constituency of Cologne III.

She lost her seat at the 2021 federal election, as she was ranked 26 on the state list. Shortly before the election it became known that she employed the wife of a high-ranking armaments lobbyist in her Bundestag office.
