= Fritz Felgentreu =

German politician

- Felgentreu in 2020

Member of the Bundestag; for Berlin-Neukölln
- In office 22 October 2013 – 26 October 2021
- Preceded by: Stefanie Vogelsang
- Succeeded by: Hakan Demir

Member of the; Berlin House of Representatives; for Neukölln 2
- In office October 2001 – 27 October 2011
- Preceded by: Wolfgang Branoner
- Succeeded by: Susanna Kahlefeld

Personal details
- Born: 1 September 1968 (age 58) Kiel, West Germany
- Party: Social Democratic
- Education: Free University of Berlin
- Occupation: Teacher

Military service
- Allegiance: Germany
- Branch/service: Bundeswehr
- Years of service: 1987–1989

Fritz Felgentreu (born 1 September 1968) is a German politician of the Social Democratic Party (SPD) who served as a member of the Bundestag from the state of Berlin from 2013 to 2021. He has been the chairman of Reichsbanner Schwarz-Rot-Gold since October 2021.

== Education and early career ==
Born in Kiel, Felgentreu graduated from high school in Büsum in 1987 and then served in the German Armed Forces for two years.

Felgentreu has been living in Berlin since 1989. From 1989 to 1995 he studied classical philology, Slavic studies and psychology at the Free University of Berlin and received his doctorate in 1998 under Widu-Wolfgang Ehlers. From 1998 to 2008 he was a research assistant at the Institute for Classical Philology at the Free University of Berlin. He also taught at Evangelisches Gymnasium zum Grauen Kloster from 2010 until 2013.

== Political career ==
Felgentreu first became member of the Bundestag in the 2013 German federal election, representing the constituency of Berlin-Neukölln. Throughout his time in parliament, he was a member of the Defense Committee. From 2014 until 2017, he also served on the Committee on Family Affairs, Senior Citizens, Women and Youth, where he was his parliamentary group's rapporteur on alimony.

In the negotiations to form a coalition government under the leadership of Chancellor Angela Merkel following the 2017 federal elections, Felgentreu was part of the working group on foreign policy, led by Ursula von der Leyen, Gerd Müller and Sigmar Gabriel. From 2018 until 2020, he served as his parliamentary group's spokesperson on defense policy; he resigned after his parliamentary group, contrary to his own recommendation, voted against the government's plans to procure armed combat drones for military use.

In June 2020, Felgentreu announced that he would not stand in the 2021 federal elections but instead resign from active politics by the end of the parliamentary term.

== Other activities ==
=== Corporate boards ===
- Concilius, Member of the Senior Advisory Board

=== Non-profit organizations ===
- Federal Academy for Security Policy (BAKS), Member of the Advisory Board
- German Historical Museum, Member of the Board of Trustees (2018–2019)
