= Britta Haßelmann =

German politician (born 1961)

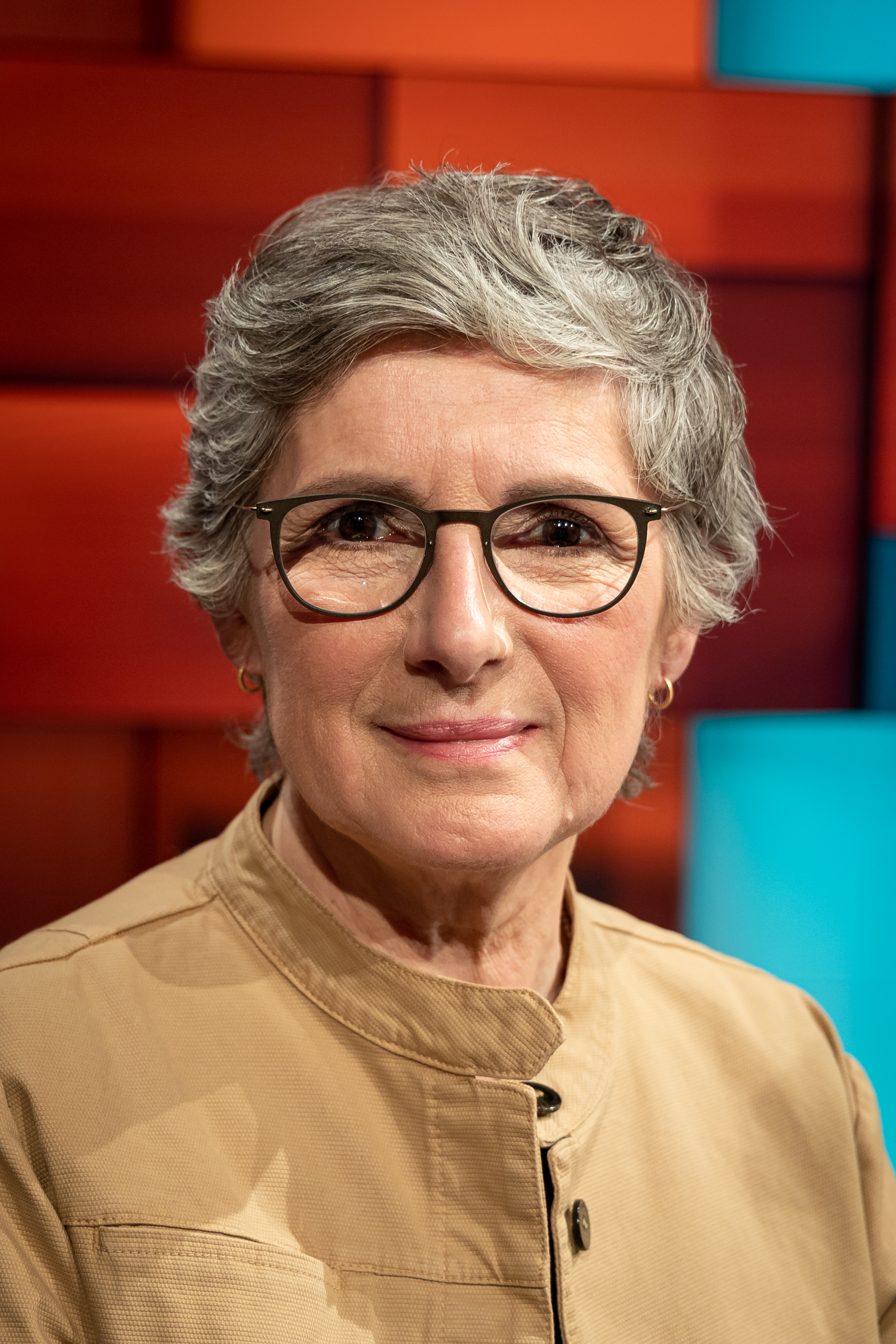
- Haßelmann in 2023

Leader of the Alliance 90/The Greens in the Bundestag
- Incumbent
- Assumed office 7 December 2021 Serving with Katharina Dröge
- Preceded by: Katrin Göring-Eckardt

Chief Whip of the Alliance '90/The Greens in the Bundestag
- In office 8 October 2013 – 7 December 2021
- Leader: Katrin Göring-Eckardt; Anton Hofreiter
- Preceded by: Volker Beck
- Succeeded by: Irene Mihalic

Member of the Bundestag
- Incumbent
- Assumed office 18 September 2005
- Constituency: North Rhine-Westphalia

Personal details
- Born: 10 December 1961 (age 64) Straelen, North Rhine-Westphalia, West Germany
- Party: Alliance 90/The Greens
- Children: 1
- Education: Bielefeld University

Britta Maria Haßelmann (born 10 December 1961) is a German politician of Alliance 90/The Greens who has been serving as co-chair of the Green Party’s parliamentary group in the Bundestag since 2021, alongside Katharina Dröge. From 2013 until 2021, she was the group’s first manager (Erste Parlamentarische Geschäftsführerin). She has been a member of the Bundestag since 2005.

== Early life and career ==
Haßelmann was born in Straelen and later studied social work at Bielefeld University.

== Political career ==
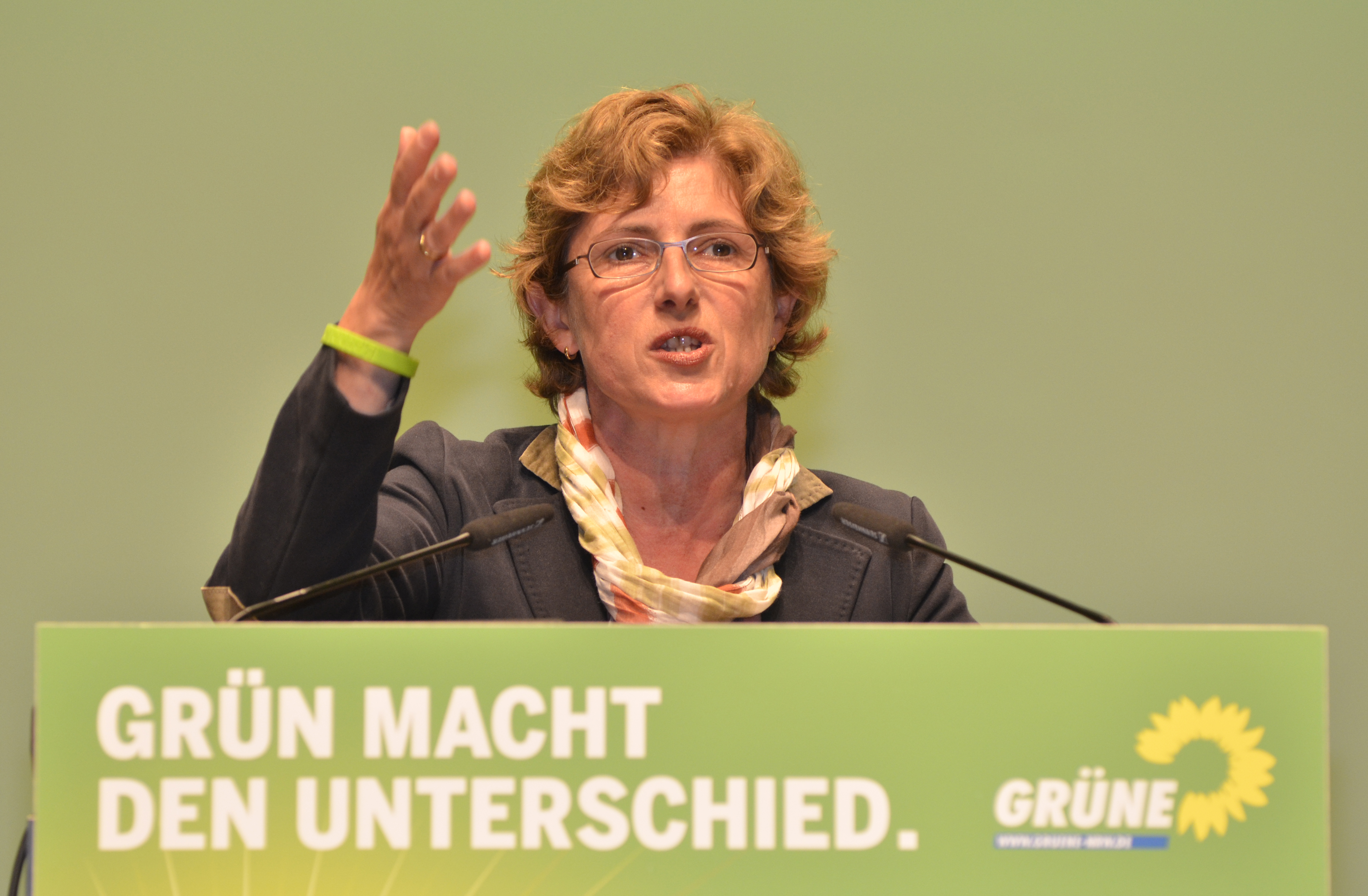
Haßelmann in 2012

=== Early beginnings ===
Haßelmann became a member of the Green Party in 1994. From 2000 until 2006, she served – alongside Frithjof Schmidt – as co-chair of the Green Party in North Rhine-Westphalia, the party's largest chapter. During that period, her party was in a coalition government with the Social Democratic Party under Minister-President Wolfgang Clement.

=== Member of the German Parliament, 2005–present ===
Haßelmann has been a member of the German Bundestag since the 2005 federal election, representing Bielefeld. From 2005 until 2017, she served on the Finance Committee. In 2009, she also joined the Council of Elders, which – among other duties – determines daily legislative agenda items and assigns committee chairpersons based on party representation. From 2017, she served on the Committee on the Scrutiny of Elections, Immunity and the Rules of Procedure as well as on the Committee on the Election of Judges (Wahlausschuss), which is in charge of appointing judges to the Federal Constitutional Court of Germany. She is also a member of the Vermittlungsausschuss of Bundestag and Bundesrat.

Within her parliamentary group, Haßelmann served as Chief Whip from 2013 until 2021, under the leadership of the group's co-chairs Katrin Göring-Eckardt and Anton Hofreiter. In the – unsuccessful – negotiations to form a coalition government with the Christian Democrats – both the Christian Democratic Union (CDU) and the Christian Social Union in Bavaria (CSU) – and the Free Democratic Party following the 2017 elections, she was part of her party's delegation.

From 2018, Haßelmann was part of a cross-party working group on a reform of Germany's electoral system, chaired by Wolfgang Schäuble.

== Other activities ==
- German National Committee for UNICEF, Member of the Board (since 2020)
- Heinrich Böll Foundation, Member of the Supervisory Board
- Terre des Femmes, Member
