= Hubert Weber (politician) =

German lawyer and politician

Member of the Bundestag for Cologne III
- In office 20 October 1969 – 4 November 1980
- Preceded by: Aenne Brauksiepe
- Succeeded by: Konrad Gilges

Personal details
- Born: 10 May 1929; Bad Kissingen, Bavaria, Germany
- Died: 25 November 2017 (aged 88)
- Political party: Social Democratic Party
- Occupation: Politician

Hubert Weber (10 May 1929 – 25 November 2017) was a German lawyer and politician of the Social Democratic Party of Germany (SPD).

== Career ==
Weber was a member of the Bundestag's finance commission. He refuted claims reported in a story by Bild am Sonntag that trade and economics relations between West Germany and the Soviet Union would only benefit the Soviets. Describing the data cited by the newspaper as a "blatant falsification" and adding that West German companies had for several years sought to maintain offices in the Soviet Union.

Following the events of the German Autumn in 1977, Weber praised the introduction of the "No Contact Act" which blocked contact between RAF prisoners and their defendants. The ban had already been enforced as the country was in a "justifiable emergency" which Weber disputed stating that the country was "not in a state of emergency" and that the courts should not strain the legal definition of an emergency.

== Sources ==
- The Daily Review (1977). The Daily Review: Volume 23.
- Stubbe da Luz, Helmut (19 April 2022). Extreme Situationen, schnelle Entscheidungen: Helmut Schmidt gegen Sturmflut und RAF-Terror. Edition Falkenberg. ISBN 9783954942657.
