= Hakan Demir (politician) =

German politician (born 1984)

Hakan Demir MdB

Member of the Bundestag; from Berlin
- Incumbent
- Assumed office 26 October 2021
- Preceded by: Fritz Felgentreu
- Constituency: Berlin-Neukölln (2021–2025); State list (2025–present)

Personal details
- Born: 16 November 1984 (age 42) Çorum, Turkey
- Party: Social Democratic
- Education: University of Trier

Hakan Demir (born 16 November 1984) is a German politician of the Social Democratic Party (SPD) who was elected as a Member of the Bundestag for the constituency of Berlin-Neukölln in 2021 federal election.

== Early life and education ==
Demir was born in Çorum, Turkey. He spent his childhood in Krefeld on the Lower Rhine. He studied political science, philosophy and business administration in Trier and spent a year abroad in Istanbul. Demir moved to Berlin-Neukölln in 2012 because of his girlfriend at the time. He was co-editor of the magazine MiGAZIN.

== Political career ==
Demir joined the SPD in 2010. He worked in the parliamentary office of SPD member of parliament Karamba Diaby from Halle (Saale). In a member poll in the run-up to the 2021 Bundestag election, Demir won the direct candidacy in the Neukölln constituency with 51.95% to 45.18% against fellow candidate Tim Renner. Although the latter had been considered the favourite of Berlin SPD lead candidate Franziska Giffey and Neukölln district mayor Martin Hikel. He subsequently won the Bundestag election against Andreas Audretsch from Bündnis 90/Die Grünen. He thus entered the Bundestag as Neukölln's representative.

In parliament, Demir has been serving on the Committee on Internal Affairs. Since 8 July 2022, he has also been a member of the 1st Committee of Inquiry of the 20th parliamentary term of the German Bundestag. Demir is co-chair of the state working group on migration and diversity in Berlin. He is a member of the state executive committee of the SPD Berlin. He is also the department chair of Department 1 of the SPD Neukölln, Rixdorf, and a member of ver.di.

Within his parliamentary group, Demir belongs to the Parliamentary Left, a left-wing movement.

In the negotiations to form a Grand Coalition under the leadership of Friedrich Merz's Christian Democrats (CDU together with the Bavarian CSU) and the SPD following the 2025 German elections, Demir was part of the SPD delegation in the working group on cultural affairs and media, led by Christiane Schenderlein, Volker Ullrich and Carsten Brosda.

In the negotiations to form a coalition government in Berlin under the prospective leadership of Elif Eralp following the 2026 state elections, Demir was a member of his party's delegation in the working group on justice, civil rights and consumer protection.

== Other activities ==
- Federal Agency for Civic Education (BPB), Member of the Board of Trustees (since 2022)
- German United Services Trade Union (ver.di), Member
