= Susanna Kahlefeld =

German politician (born 1964)

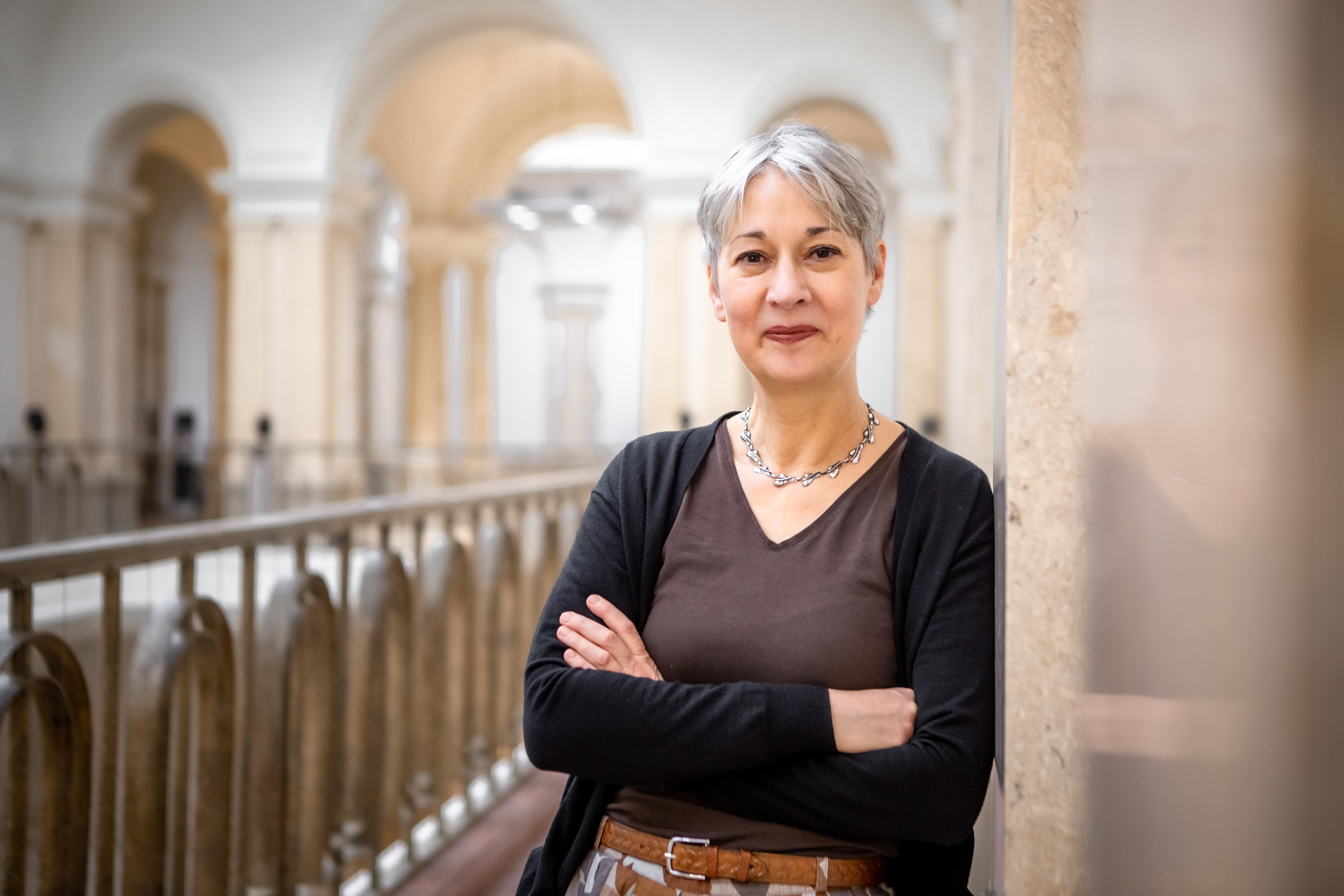
- Susanna Kahlefeld in 2021

Member of the Abgeordnetenhaus of Berlin
- Incumbent
- Assumed office 2011

Personal details
- Born: 24 January 1964 (age 62) Wuppertal, Germany
- Party: Alliance 90/The Greens
- Education: Free University of Berlin
- Website: https://susanna-kahlefeld.de/

Susanna Kahlefeld (born 24 January 1964) is a German politician from the Alliance 90/The Greens. She has been a member of the Abgeordnetenhaus of Berlin since 2011.

== Biography ==
Kahlefeld studied Catholic theology and philosophy in Berlin. In 1999, she received her doctorate from the Free University of Berlin with a dissertation on Friedrich Heinrich Jacobi. After her studies, she began working as a German teacher. She became politically active and joined the Green Party (Alliance 90/The Greens).

== Political career ==
In the 2011 Berlin state election, Kahlefeld was elected to the Abgeordnetenhaus of Berlin. She retained her seat in the 2016, 2021, and 2023 general elections. She is the spokesperson for participation and civic engagement and, since September 2019, the spokesperson for European policy for her parliamentary group. She is a member of the Europa-Union Berlin (EUB) and a founding member of the cross-party EUB parliamentary group in the Abgeordnetenhaus of Berlin.

In the 2017 German federal election, she was a candidate in Berlin-Neukölln.

In 2023, Kahlefeld suggested to Berlin's Senator for Culture, Joe Chialo, that public funding be withdrawn from the Berlin cultural institution Oyoun because it promoted the "Jewish Voice for a Just Peace in the Middle East" on its website . The organization responded with an injunction against Kahlefeld.

== See also ==
- List of members of the 19th Abgeordnetenhaus of Berlin (2021–2023)
- List of members of the 19th Abgeordnetenhaus of Berlin (2023–2026)
