= Anton Hofreiter =

German politician (born 1970)

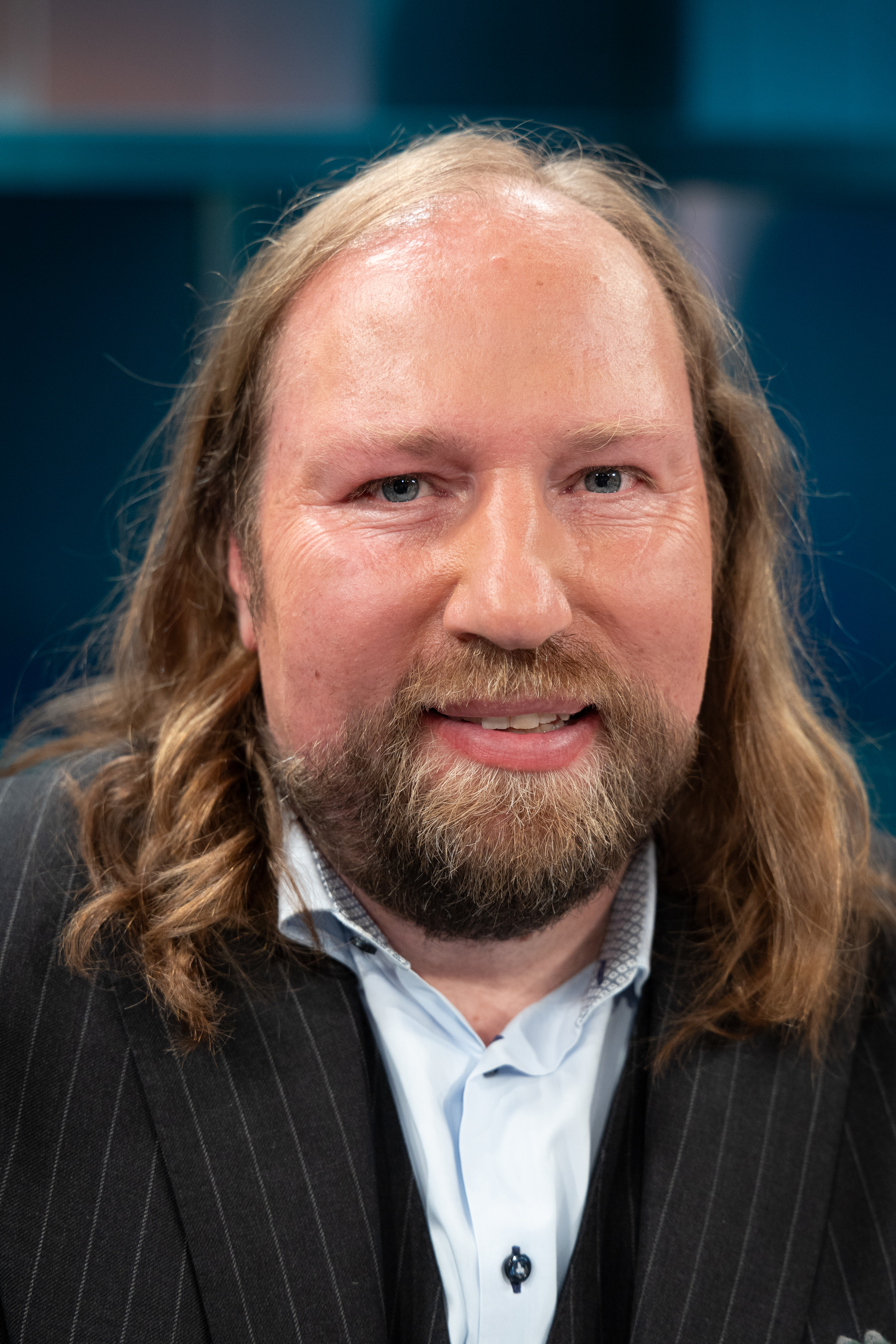
- Hofreiter in 2024

Chair of the Committee on European Affairs
- Incumbent
- Assumed office 15 December 2021
- Preceded by: Gunther Krichbaum

Leader of the Alliance 90/The Greens in the Bundestag
- In office 8 October 2013 – 7 December 2021 Serving with Katrin Göring-Eckardt
- Preceded by: Jürgen Trittin
- Succeeded by: Katharina Dröge

Chair of the Transport, Construction and Urban Development Committee
- In office 8 June 2011 – 8 October 2013
- Preceded by: Winfried Hermann
- Succeeded by: Martin Burkert

Member of the Bundestag for Bavaria
- Incumbent
- Assumed office 18 September 2005
- Constituency: Alliance 90/The Greens List

Personal details
- Born: Anton Gerhard Hofreiter; 2 February 1970 (age 56) Munich, Bavaria, West Germany
- Party: Alliance 90/The Greens
- Education: LMU Munich
- Profession: Politician, biologist
- Website: toni-hofreiter.de

Anton Gerhard "Toni" Hofreiter (born 2 February 1970) is a German politician who has been serving as a member of the Bundestag since the 2005 elections.

== Political career ==
As a member of Alliance 90/The Greens, Hofreiter has been a member of the Bundestag since the 2005 elections. Between 2005 and 2013, he served as member of the Committee on Transport, Building and Urban Development; he served as chairman of the committee from 2011 until 2013. He was also member of the German-Austrian Parliamentary Friendship Group.

Hofreiter served as co-chair of the Green Party's parliamentary group, together with Katrin Göring-Eckardt from October 2013 to December 2021. In 2013, he was elected unopposed as the sole candidate of the group's left faction. In September 2019, both Hofreiter and Göring-Eckardt were unsuccessfully challenged by Cem Özdemir and Kirsten Kappert-Gonther.

In 2011, Hofreiter joined Gerhard Schick, Hans-Christian Ströbele and Winfried Hermann in their successful 2011 constitutional complaint against the refusal of Chancellor Angela Merkel's government to provide information on the Deutsche Bahn and financial market supervision. In its judgment pronounced in 2017, the Federal Constitutional Court held that the government had indeed failed to fulfil its duty to give answers in response to parliamentary queries and to sufficiently substantiate the reasons.

Since the 2021 elections, Hofreiter has been serving as chairman of the Committee on European Affairs. In addition to his committee assignments, he has been a member of the German delegation to the Franco-German Parliamentary Assembly since 2022.

== Political positions ==
=== Human rights ===
Following 2012 reports by Spiegel Online according to which a luxury Boeing 767 belonging to Belarusian President Alexander Lukashenko was refitted by Lufthansa Technik in Hamburg with expensive accoutrement to further accommodate Lukashenko's expensive tastes, Hofreiter criticized the company for cooperating with a "dictator who gives orders for the death penalty and violently destroys the opposition".

In January 2015, Hofreiter criticized a decision by police in the eastern city of Dresden to ban an anti-Islam march after death threats toward an organizer, slamming the move as a worrying restriction on freedom of speech. In the European migration crisis, Hofreiter is an outspoken proponent of a liberal migration policy.

=== European integration ===
In a 2014 debate on a reform of the voting rules in the Governing Council of the European Central Bank, Hofreiter strongly criticized calls for a power of veto, saying to the Frankfurter Allgemeine Zeitung: "Bundesbank chief Jens Weidmann is not Germany's vicegerent in the ECB Council".

== Other activities ==
- Denkwerk Demokratie, Member of the Advisory Board
- German United Services Trade Union (ver.di), Member
