= Gerald Weiß (politician) =

German politician (1945–2022)

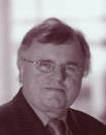

Member of the Bundestag
- In office 1998–2009

Member of the Landtag of Hesse
- In office 1991–1998
- In office 1974–1987

Personal details
- Born: 12 July 1945 Rüsselsheim am Main, Allied-occupied Germany
- Died: 21 January 2022 (aged 76)
- Party: CDU
- Education: University of Mainz

Gerald Weiß (12 July 1945 – 21 January 2022) was a German politician. A member of the Christian Democratic Union of Germany, he served in the Landtag of Hesse from 1974 to 1987 and again from 1991 to 1998 and served in the Bundestag from 1998 to 2009. He died on 21 January 2022, at the age of 76.
