= Red (platform) =

Berlin-based digital media platform

Red. or Red. Media, is an English-language website operating from Berlin from early 2023 to May 2025. It describes itself as a revolutionary, educational, independent, and progressive digital content creator that creates content focusing on progressive and anti-capitalist issues, collective rights, and the voices of activists and oppressed peoples. It published content on the Middle East conflict and the war in Gaza, taking a pro-Palestinian positions.

In July 2025, it was accused and sanctioned by the European Union as a medium of Russian propaganda.
