= Jochen Haug =

German politician

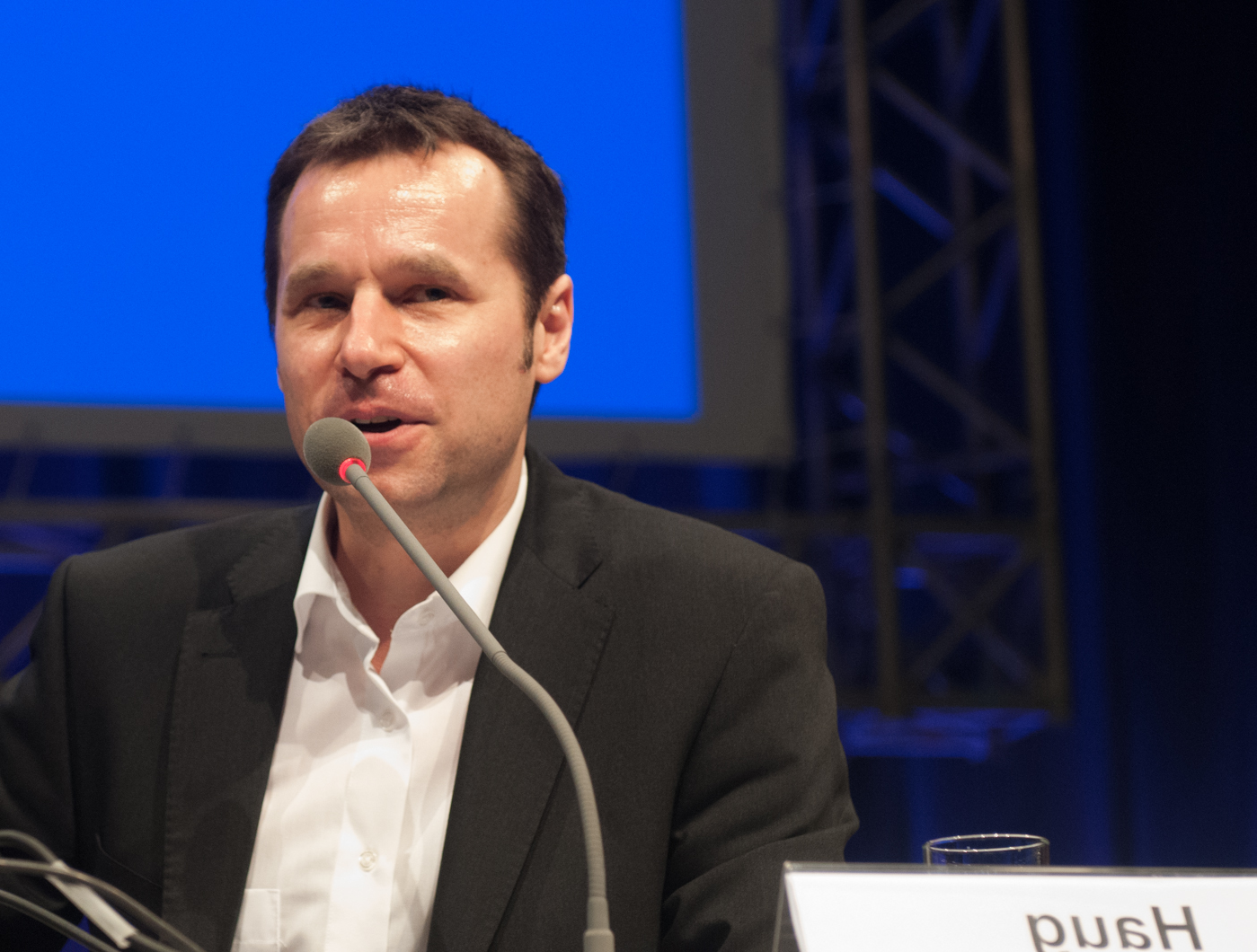

Member of the Bundestag
- Incumbent
- Assumed office 24 October 2017

Personal details
- Born: 11 January 1973 (age 53)
- Party: AfD

Jochen Haug (born 11 January 1973) is a German politician for the Alternative for Germany (AfD) and since 2017 member of the Bundestag.

== Life and politics ==
Haug was born 1973 in the West German town of Aulendorf. He studied law at the University of Tübingen to become a lawyer.

Haug became member of the Bundestag after the 2017 German federal election.

Since November 2019 Haug is member of the party executive committee (German: 'Beisitzer') of the AfD.
