= Aenne Brauksiepe =

German politician (1912–1997)

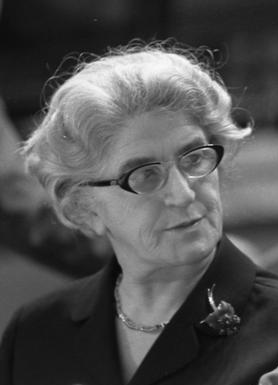

Member of the Bundestag for Cologne I
- In office 7 September 1949 – 17 October 1961
- Preceded by: Constituency established
- Succeeded by: Hans-Jürgen Wischnewski

Member of the Bundestag for Cologne III
- In office 19 October 1965 – 20 October 1969
- Preceded by: Hans Katzer
- Succeeded by: Hubert Weber

Member of the Bundestag
- In office 20 October 1969 – 22 September 1972

Minister of Family Affairs, Senior Citizens, Women and Youth
- In office 16 October 1968 – 20 October 1969
- Chancellor: Kurt Georg Kiesinger
- Preceded by: Bruno Heck
- Succeeded by: Käte Strobel

Personal details
- Born: 23 February 1912 Duisburg, Germany
- Died: 1 January 1997 (aged 84) Oelde, North Rhine-Westphalia, Germany
- Party: CDU

Aenne Brauksiepe (23 February 1912 – 1 January 1997) was a German politician of the CDU party. Her maiden name was Engels.

She joined the CDU in 1945, and became a member of the CDU-Bundesvorstand in 1956. From 1958 to 1971 she was the chief of CDU-women (Frauen-Union). Her highest job in the CDU party was as Deputy Chief of the CDU from 1967 to 1969.

She was a member of the Bundestag of West Germany from 1949 to 1972, during which time she represented Cologne II and Cologne III. For three years, from 1965 to 1968 she was the deputy leader of the CDU/CSU-Bundestagsfraktion. She was appointed Federal Minister of Family Affairs, Senior Citizens, Women and Youth in October 1968. She held this post until Chancellor Kurt Georg Kiesinger lost the election in 1969.
