= Robert Eschricht =

German politician (born 1985)

- Eschricht in 2026

Member of the Abgeordnetenhaus of Berlin
- Incumbent
- Assumed office 16 March 2023

Personal details
- Born: 1985 (age 40–41) Hamburg
- Party: Alternative for Germany

Robert Alexander Eschricht (born 1985 in Hamburg) is a German politician serving as a member of the Abgeordnetenhaus of Berlin since 2023. He has served as chairman of the Alternative for Germany in Neukölln since 2019.
