= Katharina Dröge =

German politician (born 1984)

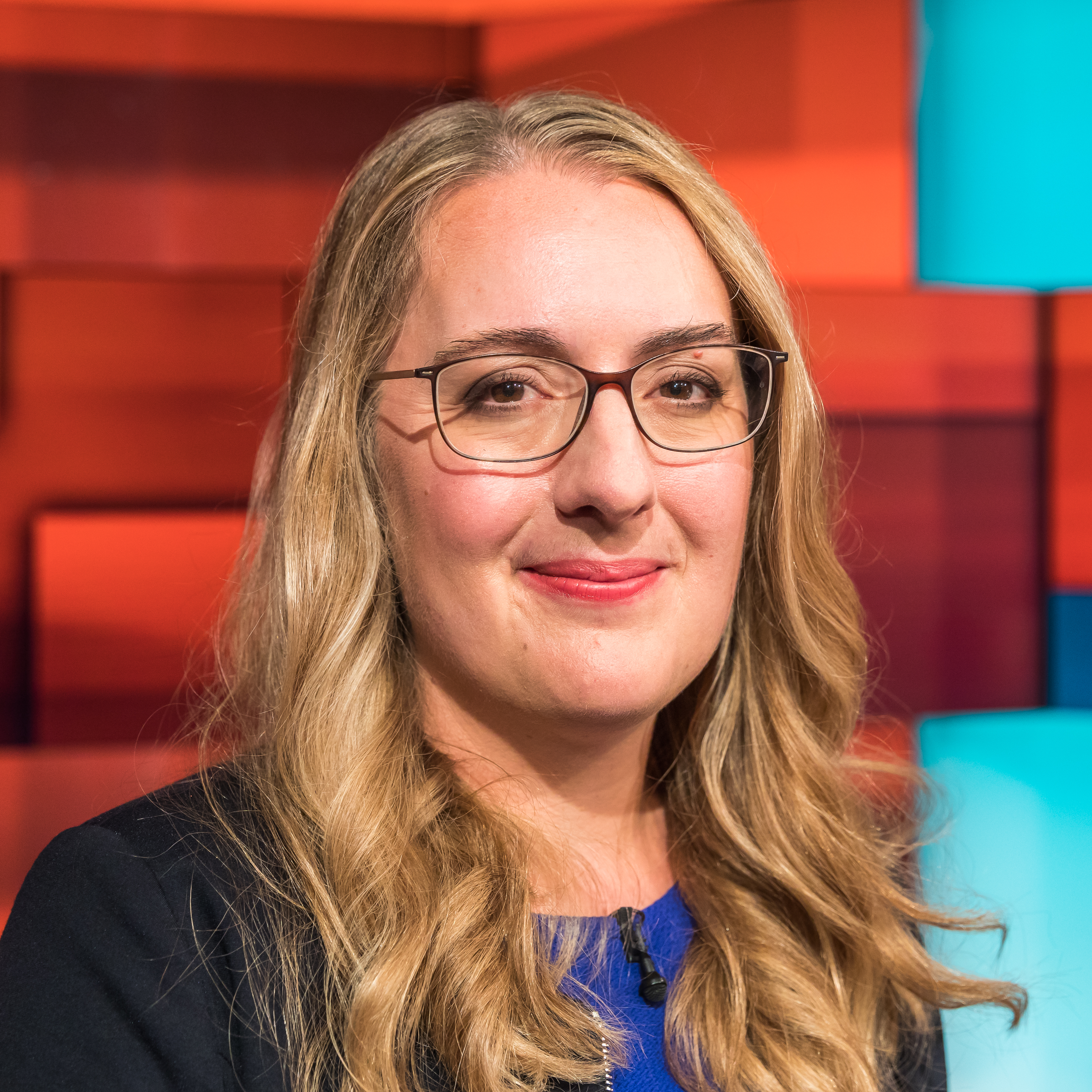
- Dröge in 2023

Leader of the Alliance 90/The Greens in the Bundestag
- Incumbent
- Assumed office 7 December 2021 Serving with Britta Haßelmann
- Preceded by: Anton Hofreiter

Member of the Bundestag for Cologne III
- Incumbent
- Assumed office 22 October 2013
- Preceded by: multi-member district
- Constituency: Alliance 90/The Greens list

Personal details
- Born: 16 September 1984 (age 42) Münster, North Rhine-Westphalia, West Germany
- Party: Alliance 90/The Greens
- Education: German Academic Scholarship Foundation
- Alma mater: University of Cologne (2004–2010)

Katharina Dröge (born 16 September 1984) is a German economist and politician of Alliance 90/The Greens who has been serving as co-chair of the Green Party’s parliamentary group in the Bundestag since 2021, alongside Britta Haßelmann. She previously served as one of the group’s managers (Parlamentarische Geschäftsführerin) from 2018 to 2021. She has been a member of the Bundestag since 2013.

== Education and early career ==
On a scholarship of the German Academic Scholarship Foundation, Dröge studied economics at the University of Cologne from 2004 to 2010.

From 2010 until 2013, Dröge worked at the State Ministry of Climate Change, Environment, Agriculture and Consumer Protection of North Rhine-Westphalia.

== Political career ==
Dröge has been a member of the German Bundestag since the 2013 elections, representing Cologne’s Ehrenfeld, Nippes, and Chorweiler districts. In parliament, she has since been serving on the Committee on Economic Affairs and Energy. She is also her parliamentary group's spokesperson on competition policy. In addition to her committee assignments, she is a member of the German-British Parliamentary Friendship Group.

In the negotiations to form a so-called traffic light coalition of the Social Democrats (SPD), the Green Party and the FDP following the 2021 federal elections, Dröge led her party's delegation in the working group on labor policy; her co-chairs from the other parties were Hubertus Heil and Johannes Vogel.

In September 2024, within a context of growing Islamophobia in Germany, Dröge drew criticism after claiming that "the poison of Islam reaches people's heads here", she later claimed that she had meant to say "Islamism" rather than "Islam".

== Other activities ==
=== Regulatory agencies ===
- Federal Network Agency for Electricity, Gas, Telecommunications, Post and Railway (BNetzA), Alternate Member of the Advisory Board (since 2014)

=== Non-profit organizations ===
- Heinrich Böll Foundation, Member of the General Assembly
- Amnesty International, Member
- Terre des Femmes, Member
- German Foundation for World Population (DSW), Member of the Parliamentary Advisory Board (since 2021)

== Political positions ==
Within the Green Party, Dröge is considered to be part of its left wing.
