= Johannes Albers =

German politician (1890–1963)

Member of the Bundestag
- In office 7 September 1949 – 6 October 1957

Personal details
- Born: 8 March 1890 Mönchengladbach
- Died: 8 March 1963 (aged 73) Köln, North Rhine-Westphalia, West Germany
- Party: CDU
- Occupation: Managing Director

Johannes Albers (8 March 1890 – 8 March 1963) was a German politician of the Christian Democratic Union (CDU) and former member of the German Bundestag.

== Life ==
From 1946 to 1950 Albers was a member of the state parliament of North Rhine-Westphalia. From 1949 to 1957 he was a member of the German Bundestag. In 1949/50 he was chairman of the Bundestag Committee for Reconstruction and Housing. Since 31 January 1951 he had been deputy chairman of the CDU parliamentary group.

== Literature ==
Herbst, Ludolf; Jahn, Bruno (2002). Vierhaus, Rudolf (ed.). Biographisches Handbuch der Mitglieder des Deutschen Bundestages. 1949–2002 [Biographical Handbook of the Members of the German Bundestag. 1949–2002] (in German). München: De Gruyter - De Gruyter Saur. p. 1715. ISBN 978-3-11-184511-1.
