= Nuremberg North =

Federal electoral district of Germany

243 Nuremberg North
- Electoral district for the Bundestag
- Nuremberg North in 2025
- State: Bavaria
- Population: 290,300 (2019)
- Electorate: 187,178 (2025)
- Major settlements: Nuremberg (partial)
- Area: 85.8 km^{2}

Current electoral district
- Created: 1965
- Member: Vacant
- Elected: 2025

Nuremberg North (German: Nürnberg-Nord) is an electoral constituency (German: Wahlkreis) represented in the Bundestag. It elects one member via first-past-the-post voting. Under the current constituency numbering system, it is designated as constituency 243. It is located in northern Bavaria, comprising the northern part of the city of Nuremberg.

Nuremberg North was created for the 1965 federal election. Whilst the Christian Social Union won the plurality in the 2025 election, under the new voting system, their candidate did not actually win a seat in the Bundestag. This was due to the distribution of seats won by the CSU being decided by the first (direct) vote percentage of each winning CSU candidate, determining who took the seats. As the CSU candidate got a low vote of 30.2%, the seat will remain vacant throughout the 21st Bundestag.

== Geography ==
Nuremberg North is located in northern Bavaria. As of the 2021 federal election, it comprises the Stadtbezirke 01 through 13, 22 through 30, 64, 65, 70 through 87, and 90 through 95 from the independent city of Nuremberg North.

== History ==
Nuremberg North was created in 1965. In the 1965 through 1998 elections, it was constituency 230 in the numbering system. In the 2002 and 2005 elections, it was number 245. In the 2009 through 2021 elections, it was number 244. From the 2025 election, it has been number 243.

Originally, the constituency comprised the northern half of the city of Nuremberg. It acquired its current borders in the 2002 election.

Election	No.	Name	Borders
1965	230	Nürnberg-Nord	Nuremberg city (only northern half)
1969	230	Nürnberg-Nord	Nuremberg city (only northern half)
1972	230	Nürnberg-Nord	Nuremberg city (only northern half)
1976	230	Nürnberg-Nord	Nuremberg city (only northern half)
1980	230	Nürnberg-Nord	Nuremberg city (only northern half)
1983	230	Nürnberg-Nord	Nuremberg city (only northern half)
1987	230	Nürnberg-Nord	Nuremberg city (only northern half)
1990	230	Nürnberg-Nord	Nuremberg city (only northern half)
1994	230	Nürnberg-Nord	Nuremberg city (only northern half)
1998	230	Nürnberg-Nord	Nuremberg city (only northern half)
2002	245	Nürnberg-Nord	Nuremberg city (only Stadtbezirke 01 through 13, 22 through 30, 64, 65, 70 through 87, and 90 through 95)
2005	245	Nürnberg-Nord	Nuremberg city (only Stadtbezirke 01 through 13, 22 through 30, 64, 65, 70 through 87, and 90 through 95)
2009	244	Nürnberg-Nord	Nuremberg city (only Stadtbezirke 01 through 13, 22 through 30, 64, 65, 70 through 87, and 90 through 95)
2013	244	Nürnberg-Nord	Nuremberg city (only Stadtbezirke 01 through 13, 22 through 30, 64, 65, 70 through 87, and 90 through 95)
2017	244	Nürnberg-Nord	Nuremberg city (only Stadtbezirke 01 through 13, 22 through 30, 64, 65, 70 through 87, and 90 through 95)
2021	244	Nürnberg-Nord	Nuremberg city (only Stadtbezirke 01 through 13, 22 through 30, 64, 65, 70 through 87, and 90 through 95)
2025	243	Nürnberg-Nord	Nuremberg city (only Stadtbezirke 01 through 13, 22 through 30, 64, 65, 70 through 87, and 90 through 95)

== Members ==
The constituency was first represented by Georg Kurlbaum of the Social Democratic Party (SPD) from 1965 to 1969, followed by fellow SPD member Hans Batz until 1980. Renate Schmidt of the SPD served one term from 1980 to 1983. [[Oscar Schneider|Oscar Schneider]] of the Christian Social Union (CSU) was elected in 1983 and was representative until 1990, when former member Renate Schmidt regained it for the SPD and served another term. Dagmar Wöhrl of the CSU won it in 1994. Günter Gloser of the SPD was elected in 1998. Former member Wöhrl was then re-elected in 2002, and served until 2017. Sebastian Brehm was elected in 2017 and re-elected in 2021. The seat became vacant as a result of the 2025 election.

Election	Member	Party	%
1965	Georg Kurlbaum	SPD	42.4
1969	Hans Batz	SPD	47.1
1972	Hans Batz	SPD	51.9
1976	Hans Batz	SPD	46.4
1980	Renate Schmidt	SPD	45.1
1983	Oscar Schneider	CSU	49.6
1987	Oscar Schneider	CSU	46.5
1990	Renate Schmidt	SPD	42.3
1994	Dagmar Wöhrl	CSU	44.5
1998	Günter Gloser	SPD	45.5
2002	Dagmar Wöhrl	CSU	45.8
2005	Dagmar Wöhrl	CSU	42.0
2009	Dagmar Wöhrl	CSU	36.6
2013	Dagmar Wöhrl	CSU	39.4
2017	Sebastian Brehm	CSU	31.3
2021	Sebastian Brehm	CSU	28.5
2025	Vacant (Note: Sebastian Brehm (CSU) won with 30.2% but seat remained vacant due to insufficient second votes cover.)		

== Election results ==
=== 2025 election ===
Under the new voting system implemented for the 2025 election, although the CSU candidate won the most votes in this constituency, due to the low winning percentage, the constituency seat will remain vacant as not enough second (party) votes were won to be allocated this seat.

Federal election (2025): Nuremberg North
Notes:	Blue background denotes the winner of the electorate vote. Pink background denotes a candidate elected from their party list. Yellow background denotes an electorate win by a list member, or other incumbent. A ✓ or ✗ denotes status of any incumbent, win or lose respectively.						
Party	Candidate	Votes	%	±%	Party votes	%	±%
CSU	✗ Sebastian Brehm	45,420	30.2	▲1.7	41,084	27.3	▲3.5
Greens	Rebecca Lenhard	32,432	21.6	▼1.0	29,683	19.7	▼3.9
SPD	Gabriela Heinrich	26,739	17.8	▼4.2	23,568	15.6	▼5.3
AfD	Roland Alexander Hübscher	18,093	12.0	▲6.1	18,303	12.1	▲6.0
Left	Titus Schüller	14,697	9.8	▲4.4	19,233	12.8	▲6.8
FDP	Katja Hessel	4,976	3.3	▼4.2	6,530	4.3	▼5.8
BSW					5,622	3.7	
FW	Dr. Robert Franz Mahler	2,962	2.0	▼1.0	1,761	1.2	▼1.3
Volt	Christian Penninger	2,243	1.5	▲0.9	1,582	1.0	▲0.6
APT					1,291	0.9	▼0.3
PARTEI	Jörg Knapp	1,597	1.1		748	0.5	▼0.5
ÖDP	Inga Hager	984	0.7	▼0.6	488	0.3	▼0.3
dieBasis					414	0.3	▼1.3
Humanists					158	0.1	Steady
BD					139	0.1	
MLPD	Karin Angelika Podufal	346	0.2	▲0.1	83	0.1	Steady
BP					56	0.0	Steady
Informal votes		889			635		
Total valid votes		150,489			150,743		
Turnout		151,378	80.9	▲3.7			
Vacant gain from CSU	Majority						

=== 2021 election ===
Federal election (2021): Nuremberg North
Notes:	Blue background denotes the winner of the electorate vote. Pink background denotes a candidate elected from their party list. Yellow background denotes an electorate win by a list member, or other incumbent. A ✓ or ✗ denotes status of any incumbent, win or lose respectively.						
Party	Candidate	Votes	%	±%	Party votes	%	±%
CSU	✓ Sebastian Brehm	41,027	28.5	▼2.8	34,349	23.8	▼3.8
Greens	Tessa Ganserer	32,541	22.6	▲9.8	34,055	23.6	▲8.5
SPD	Gabriela Heinrich	31,616	21.9	▼3.7	30,232	20.9	▲2.7
FDP	Katja Hessel	10,882	7.5	▲0.4	14,692	10.2	▼0.4
AfD	Martin Sichert	8,485	5.9	▼3.4	8,887	6.2	▼3.8
Left	Titus Schüller	7,726	5.4	▼4.7	8,627	6.0	▼5.7
FW	Thomas Estrada	4,286	3.0	▲0.9	3,621	2.5	▲1.3
dieBasis	Klaus Kinzel	2,777	1.9		2,310	1.6	
Tierschutzpartei					1,662	1.2	▲0.1
PARTEI					1,462	1.0	▼0.4
Team Todenhöfer					887	0.6	
Pirates	Lukas Küffner	1,849	1.3		784	0.5	0.0
ÖDP	Christian Rechholz	1,813	1.3	▼0.4	830	0.6	▼0.3
Volt	Christian Penninger	856	0.6		656	0.4	
Humanists					217	0.2	
Unabhängige					204	0.1	
Independent	Markus Eppel	199	0.1				
V-Partei3					192	0.1	▼0.1
Gesundheitsforschung					165	0.1	0.0
BP					125	0.1	▼0.1
Bündnis C					118	0.1	
du.					119	0.1	
DKP					88	0.1	0.0
NPD					78	0.1	▼0.2
MLPD	Michel Barimis	149	0.1	▼0.1	56	0.0	0.0
The III. Path					39	0.0	
LKR					31	0.0	
Informal votes		1,006			726		
Total valid votes		144,206			144,486		
Turnout		145,212	77.1	▲1.1			
CSU hold	Majority	8,486	5.9	▲0.2			

=== 2017 election ===
Federal election (2017): Nuremberg North
Notes:	Blue background denotes the winner of the electorate vote. Pink background denotes a candidate elected from their party list. Yellow background denotes an electorate win by a list member, or other incumbent. A ✓ or ✗ denotes status of any incumbent, win or lose respectively.						
Party	Candidate	Votes	%	±%	Party votes	%	±%
CSU	Sebastian Brehm	45,340	31.3	▼8.1	40,106	27.6	▼7.1
SPD	Gabriela Heinrich	37,068	25.6	▼6.1	26,456	18.2	▼8.6
Greens	Britta Walthelm	18,463	12.7	▲2.6	21,909	15.1	▲1.8
Left	Titus Schüller	14,511	10.0	▲3.9	16,962	11.7	▲4.6
AfD	Martin Sichert	13,398	9.2	▲5.9	14,503	10.0	▲5.5
FDP	Katja Hessel	10,379	7.2	▲4.5	15,412	10.6	▲5.2
PARTEI					2,076	1.4	
FW	Jürgen Horst Dörfler	3,058	2.1	▲0.5	1,824	1.3	▼0.2
Tierschutzpartei					1,595	1.1	▲0.3
ÖDP	Manuela Forster	2,342	1.6		1,254	0.9	▲0.1
Pirates					809	0.6	▼2.6
DiB					448	0.3	
BGE					353	0.2	
V-Partei³					328	0.2	
NPD					311	0.2	▼0.6
DM					253	0.2	
BP					251	0.2	▼0.1
Gesundheitsforschung					203	0.1	
MLPD	Johannes Rupprecht	364	0.3	▲0.2	124	0.1	0.0
DKP					108	0.1	
BüSo					18	0.0	0.0
Informal votes		1,282			902		
Total valid votes		144,923			145,303		
Turnout		146,205	76.1	▲7.3			
CSU hold	Majority	8,272	5.7	▼2.0			

=== 2013 election ===
Federal election (2013): Nuremberg North
Notes:	Blue background denotes the winner of the electorate vote. Pink background denotes a candidate elected from their party list. Yellow background denotes an electorate win by a list member, or other incumbent. A ✓ or ✗ denotes status of any incumbent, win or lose respectively.						
Party	Candidate	Votes	%	±%	Party votes	%	±%
CSU	✓ Dagmar Wöhrl	51,829	39.4	▲2.7	45,748	34.8	▲4.8
SPD	Gabriela Heinrich	41,666	31.7	▲0.8	35,310	26.8	▲4.6
Greens	Harald Fuchs	13,336	10.1	▼1.1	17,444	13.3	▼2.4
Left	Harald Weinberg	8,099	6.2	▼2.0	9,311	7.1	▼2.3
AfD	Marcel Claus	4,417	3.4		5,906	4.5	
Pirates	Emanuel Kotzian	4,055	3.1	▼0.1	4,221	3.2	▼0.5
FDP	Tilman Schürer	3,556	2.7	▼5.3	7,150	5.4	▼8.4
FW	Gerhard Emmert	2,134	1.6		1,909	1.5	
NPD	Christine Rorich	1,341	1.0	▼0.7	1,061	0.8	▼0.6
Tierschutzpartei					1,032	0.8	▼0.1
ÖDP					940	0.7	▲0.1
PARTEI	Klaus Hammerlindl	873	0.7				
REP					409	0.3	▼0.1
BP					337	0.3	▲0.1
DIE FRAUEN					244	0.2	
Independent	Walter Pfleiderer	193	0.1				
DIE VIOLETTEN					165	0.1	▼0.1
MLPD	Johannes Rupprecht	122	0.1	0.0	149	0.1	0.0
Party of Reason					147	0.1	
PRO					81	0.1	
RRP					57	0.0	▼0.8
BüSo					26	0.0	0.0
Informal votes		1,053			1,027		
Total valid votes		131,621			131,647		
Turnout		132,674	68.7	▼2.5			
CSU hold	Majority	10,163	7.7	▲2.0			

=== 2009 election ===
Federal election (2009): Nuremberg North
Notes:	Blue background denotes the winner of the electorate vote. Pink background denotes a candidate elected from their party list. Yellow background denotes an electorate win by a list member, or other incumbent. A ✓ or ✗ denotes status of any incumbent, win or lose respectively.						
Party	Candidate	Votes	%	±%	Party votes	%	±%
CSU	✓ Dagmar Wöhrl	48,943	36.6	▼5.3	40,094	29.9	▼6.0
SPD	Günter Gloser	41,246	30.9	▼9.0	29,751	22.2	▼11.4
Greens	Michael Hauck	15,043	11.3	▲4.1	20,934	15.6	▲3.2
Left	Harald Weinberg	10,923	8.2	▲4.0	12,554	9.4	▲4.2
FDP	Andreas Neuner	10,652	8.0	▲4.1	18,528	13.8	▲4.8
Pirates	Emanuel Kotzian	4,268	3.2		4,940	3.7	
NPD	Gerhard Schelle	2,320	1.7	▲0.1	1,835	1.4	0.0
Tierschutzpartei					1,129	0.8	
RRP					1,081	0.8	
ÖDP					847	0.6	
FAMILIE					620	0.5	▲0.1
REP					611	0.5	0.0
DIE VIOLETTEN					313	0.2	
BP					233	0.2	▼0.1
PBC					168	0.1	▼0.2
MLPD	Johannes Rupprecht	187	0.1	0.0	106	0.1	0.0
CM					89	0.1	
DVU					79	0.1	
BüSo					52	0.0	0.0
Informal votes		1,572			1,190		
Total valid votes		133,582			133,964		
Turnout		135,154	71.2	▼4.8			
CSU hold	Majority	7,697	5.7	▲3.6			

=== 2005 election ===
Federal election (2005):Nuremberg North
Notes:	Blue background denotes the winner of the electorate vote. Pink background denotes a candidate elected from their party list. Yellow background denotes an electorate win by a list member, or other incumbent. A ✓ or ✗ denotes status of any incumbent, win or lose respectively.						
Party	Candidate	Votes	%	±%	Party votes	%	±%
CSU	✓ Dagmar Wöhrl	57,917	42.0	▼3.8	49,634	35.9	▼6.8
SPD	Günter Gloser	55,046	39.9	▼2.5	46,456	33.6	▼3.4
Greens	Christine Seer	9,878	7.2	▲1.3	17,221	12.5	▲1.0
Left	Harald Weinberg	5,780	4.2	▲3.0	7,178	5.2	▲3.8
FDP	Frank Knapp	5,317	3.9	▲0.7	12,476	9.0	▲4.1
NPD	Chrisitan Wilke	2,283	1.7		1,944	1.4	▲1.1
BP	Uwe Laschke	907	0.7		428	0.3	▲0.3
REP					693	0.5	▼0.2
PBC					461	0.3	▲0.1
GRAUEN					615	0.4	▲0.3
Familie					557	0.4	
Feminist					312	0.2	▲0.1
MLPD					161	0.1	
BüSo					77	0.1	0.0
Informal votes		1,729			1,500		
Total valid votes		137,984			138,213		
Turnout		139,713	76.1	▼2.4			
CSU hold	Majority	2,871	2.1				
