= Erlangen (electoral district) =

Federal electoral district of Germany

241 Erlangen
- Electoral district for the Bundestag
- Erlangen in 2025
- State: Bavaria
- Population: 257,100 (2019)
- Electorate: 186,493 (2025)
- Major settlements: Erlangen; Herzogenaurach; Höchstadt
- Area: 720.5 km^{2}

Current electoral district
- Created: 1949
- Party: CSU
- Member: Konrad Körner
- Elected: 2025

Erlangen is an electoral constituency (German: Wahlkreis) represented in the Bundestag. It elects one member via first-past-the-post voting. Under the current constituency numbering system, it is designated as constituency 241. It is located in northern Bavaria, comprising the city of Erlangen and the district of Erlangen-Höchstadt.

Erlangen was created for the inaugural 1949 federal election. Since 2025, it has been represented by Konrad Körner of the Christian Social Union (CSU).

== Geography ==
Erlangen is located in northern Bavaria. As of the 2021 federal election, it comprises the independent city of Erlangen, the district of Erlangen-Höchstadt, and the Verwaltungsgemeinschaft of Uehlfeld from the district of Neustadt (Aisch)-Bad Windsheim.

== History ==
Erlangen was created in 1949. In the 1949 election, it was Bavaria constituency 31 in the numbering system. In the 1953 through 1961 elections, it was number 226. In the 1965 through 1998 elections, it was number 228. In the 2002 and 2005 elections, it was number 243. In the 2009 through 2021 elections, it was number 242. From the 2025 election, it has been number 241.

Originally, the constituency comprised the independent city of Erlangen and the districts of Landkreis Erlangen, Fürth, Neustadt an der Aisch, and Scheinfeld. In the 1965 through 1972 elections, it comprised the city of Erlangen and the districts of Landkreis Erlangen, Landkreis Nürnberg, Hersbruck, and Lauf an der Pegnitz. In the 1976 through 1987 elections, it comprised the city of Erlangen and the districts of Nürnberger Land and Erlangen-Höchstadt excluding the municipalities of Aurachtal and Herzogenaurach. In the 1990 through 2017 elections, it comprised the city of Erlangen and the district of Erlangen-Höchstadt. It acquired its current borders in the 2021 election.

Election	No.	Name	Borders
1949	31	Erlangen	Erlangen city; Landkreis Erlangen district; Fürth district; Neustadt an der Aisch district; Scheinfeld district
1953	226	Erlangen	Erlangen city; Landkreis Erlangen district; Fürth district; Neustadt an der Aisch district; Scheinfeld district
1957	226	Erlangen	Erlangen city; Landkreis Erlangen district; Fürth district; Neustadt an der Aisch district; Scheinfeld district
1961	226	Erlangen	Erlangen city; Landkreis Erlangen district; Fürth district; Neustadt an der Aisch district; Scheinfeld district
1965	228	Erlangen	Erlangen city; Landkreis Erlangen district; Landkreis Nürnberg district; Hersbruck district; Lauf an der Pegnitz district
1969	228	Erlangen	Erlangen city; Landkreis Erlangen district; Landkreis Nürnberg district; Hersbruck district; Lauf an der Pegnitz district
1972	228	Erlangen	Erlangen city; Landkreis Erlangen district; Landkreis Nürnberg district; Hersbruck district; Lauf an der Pegnitz district
1976	228	Erlangen	Erlangen city; Nürnberger Land district; Erlangen-Höchstadt (excluding Aurachtal and Herzogenaurach municipalities)
1980	228	Erlangen	Erlangen city; Nürnberger Land district; Erlangen-Höchstadt (excluding Aurachtal and Herzogenaurach municipalities)
1983	228	Erlangen	Erlangen city; Nürnberger Land district; Erlangen-Höchstadt (excluding Aurachtal and Herzogenaurach municipalities)
1987	228	Erlangen	Erlangen city; Nürnberger Land district; Erlangen-Höchstadt (excluding Aurachtal and Herzogenaurach municipalities)
1990	228	Erlangen	Erlangen city; Erlangen-Höchstadt district
1994	228	Erlangen	Erlangen city; Erlangen-Höchstadt district
1998	228	Erlangen	Erlangen city; Erlangen-Höchstadt district
2002	243	Erlangen	Erlangen city; Erlangen-Höchstadt district
2005	243	Erlangen	Erlangen city; Erlangen-Höchstadt district
2009	242	Erlangen	Erlangen city; Erlangen-Höchstadt district
2013	242	Erlangen	Erlangen city; Erlangen-Höchstadt district
2017	242	Erlangen	Erlangen city; Erlangen-Höchstadt district
2021	242	Erlangen	Erlangen city; Erlangen-Höchstadt district; Neustadt (Aisch)-Bad Windsheim district (only Uehlfeld Verwaltungsgemeinschaft)
2025	241	Erlangen	Erlangen city; Erlangen-Höchstadt district; Neustadt (Aisch)-Bad Windsheim district (only Uehlfeld Verwaltungsgemeinschaft)

== Members ==
The constituency has been held by the Christian Social Union (CSU) during all but three Bundestag terms since its creation. It was first represented by Willibald Mücke of the Social Democratic Party (SPD) from 1949 to 1953. Werner Dollinger of the CSU won it in 1953, and served until 1965. Adalbert Hudak of the CSU then served one term. Dieter Haack of the SPD was elected in 1969 and was representative until 1976, when Klaus Hartmann won it for the CSU. He was succeeded in 1987 by Gerhard Friedrich. Stefan Müller was elected in 2002, and re-elected in 2005, 2009, 2013, 2017, and 2021, and was succeeded in 2025 by Konrad Körner.

Election	Member	Party	%
1949	Willibald Mücke	SPD	26.8
1953	Werner Dollinger	CSU	42.7
1957	Werner Dollinger	CSU	55.5
1961	Werner Dollinger	CSU	51.7
1965	Adalbert Hudak	CSU	47.2
1969	Willibald Mücke	SPD	45.5
1972	Willibald Mücke	SPD	51.9
1976	Klaus Hartmann	CSU	50.1
1980	Klaus Hartmann	CSU	47.7
1983	Klaus Hartmann	CSU	52.8
1987	Gerhard Friedrich	CSU	47.5
1990	Gerhard Friedrich	CSU	47.5
1994	Gerhard Friedrich	CSU	48.9
1998	Gerhard Friedrich	CSU	46.0
2002	Stefan Müller	CSU	49.3
2005	Stefan Müller	CSU	47.4
2009	Stefan Müller	CSU	45.1
2013	Stefan Müller	CSU	48.5
2017	Stefan Müller	CSU	42.7
2021	Stefan Müller	CSU	35.1
2025	Konrad Körner	CSU	35.9

== Election results ==
=== 2025 election ===
Federal election (2025): Erlangen
Notes:	Blue background denotes the winner of the electorate vote. Pink background denotes a candidate elected from their party list. Yellow background denotes an electorate win by a list member, or other incumbent. A ✓ or ✗ denotes status of any incumbent, win or lose respectively.						
Party	Candidate	Votes	%	±%	Party votes	%	±%
CSU	Dr. Konrad Körner	57,972	35.9	▲0.8	54,595	33.7	▲4.9
Greens	Paulus Guter	29,337	18.2	▼1.2	29,142	18.0	▼2.2
SPD	✗ Martina Stamm-Fibich	28,003	17.3	▼3.4	22,444	13.9	▼5.6
AfD	Robert Aust	22,637	14.0	▲7.1	23,505	14.5	▲7.5
Left	Lukas Eitel	9,115	5.6		11,552	7/1	▲3.4
BSW					4,757	2.9	
FW	Axel Rogner	7,023	4.4	▼0.8	4,129	2.6	▼2.0
FDP	Leif Erik Persson	4,761	2.9	▼3.8	6,888	4.3	▼6.1
Volt	Verena Röckelein	2,571	1.6		1,375	0.8	▲0.5
Tierschutzpartei					1,170	0.7	▼0.2
PARTEI					703	0.4	▼0.3
ÖDP					557	0.3	▼0.4
dieBasis					496	0.3	▼1.0
Humanists					170	0.1	Steady
BP					137	0.1	Steady
BD					129	0.1	
MLPD					50	0.0	Steady
Informal votes		847			467		
Total valid votes		161,419			161,799		
Turnout		162,266	87.0	▲4.1			
CSU hold	Majority	28,635	17.7	▲3.3			

=== 2021 election ===
Federal election (2021): Erlangen
Notes:	Blue background denotes the winner of the electorate vote. Pink background denotes a candidate elected from their party list. Yellow background denotes an electorate win by a list member, or other incumbent. A ✓ or ✗ denotes status of any incumbent, win or lose respectively.						
Party	Candidate	Votes	%	±%	Party votes	%	±%
CSU	✓ Stefan Müller	54,223	35.1	▼7.6	44,664	28.9	▼6.8
SPD	Martina Stamm-Fibich	32,036	20.7	▼0.1	30,146	19.5	▲2.2
Greens	Tina Prietz	29,923	19.4	▲8.4	31,222	20.2	▲6.9
AfD	Christian Beßler	10,669	6.9	▼1.1	10,872	7.0	▼2.5
FDP	Ralf Schwab	10,382	6.7	▲0.8	16,062	10.4	▲0.3
FW	Anna-Carina Häußler	7,888	5.1	▲2.1	7,081	4.6	▲2.3
Left					5,817	3.8	▼3.8
dieBasis	Torsten Weber	2,619	1.7		2,084	1.3	
Tierschutzpartei					1,370	0.9	▲0.1
PARTEI	Stefan Müller	2,578	1.7		1,210	0.8	▼0.1
ÖDP	Christian Stadelmann	2,080	1.3	▼0.4	1,077	0.7	▼0.2
Pirates	Jürgen Purzner	1,259	0.8	▼0.1	676	0.4	0.0
Volt					529	0.3	
Team Todenhöfer					496	0.3	
Independent	Susanne Henig	366	0.2				
Unabhängige					235	0.2	
Humanists					220	0.1	
BP					202	0.1	▼0.1
V-Partei3					175	0.1	▼0.1
Gesundheitsforschung					153	0.1	0.0
Bündnis C					120	0.1	
NPD					102	0.1	▼0.2
du.					70	0.0	
The III. Path					61	0.0	
MLPD	Richard Straub	188	0.1		31	0.0	0.0
Independent	Adam Kunstmann	127	0.1				
Independent	Rüdiger Kalupner	93	0.1				
LKR					19	0.0	
DKP					14	0.0	0.0
Informal votes		946			669		
Total valid votes		154,431			154,708		
Turnout		155,377	83.0	▲1.1			
CSU hold	Majority	22,187	14.4	▼7.6			

=== 2017 election ===
Federal election (2017): Erlangen
Notes:	Blue background denotes the winner of the electorate vote. Pink background denotes a candidate elected from their party list. Yellow background denotes an electorate win by a list member, or other incumbent. A ✓ or ✗ denotes status of any incumbent, win or lose respectively.						
Party	Candidate	Votes	%	±%	Party votes	%	±%
CSU	✓ Stefan Müller	62,767	42.7	▼5.9	52,414	35.6	▼6.1
SPD	Martina Stamm-Fibich	30,965	21.0	▼5.3	25,578	17.4	▼7.0
Greens	Helmut Wening	16,179	11.0	▲2.1	19,862	13.5	▲2.0
AfD	Paul Podolay	11,670	7.9	▲4.7	13,953	9.5	▲5.3
FDP	Britta Dassler	8,713	5.9	▲3.7	14,973	10.2	▲4.6
Left	Anton Salzbrunn	8,633	5.9	▲1.7	11,115	7.5	▲3.2
FW	Christian Enz	4,229	2.9	▼0.2	3,235	2.2	▼0.5
ÖDP	Florian Timo Reinhart	2,650	1.8		1,266	0.9	0.0
PARTEI					1,254	0.9	
Tierschutzpartei					1,167	0.8	▲0.1
Pirates	Jürgen Georg Purzner	1,354	0.9	▼1.5	678	0.5	▼2.0
NPD					361	0.2	▼0.4
DiB					302	0.2	
BP					280	0.2	▼0.2
V-Partei³					263	0.2	
DM					216	0.1	
BGE					212	0.1	
Gesundheitsforschung					142	0.1	
MLPD					68	0.0	0.0
BüSo					17	0.0	0.0
DKP					16	0.0	
Informal votes		888			676		
Total valid votes		147,160			147,372		
Turnout		148,048	81.9	▲6.6			
CSU hold	Majority	31,802	21.7	▼0.5			

=== 2013 election ===
Federal election (2013): Erlangen
Notes:	Blue background denotes the winner of the electorate vote. Pink background denotes a candidate elected from their party list. Yellow background denotes an electorate win by a list member, or other incumbent. A ✓ or ✗ denotes status of any incumbent, win or lose respectively.						
Party	Candidate	Votes	%	±%	Party votes	%	±%
CSU	✓ Stefan Müller	65,151	48.5	▲3.4	55,940	41.7	▲5.6
SPD	Martina Stamm-Fibich	35,377	26.3	▲2.3	32,638	24.3	▲3.3
Greens	Ernst Rappold	11,980	8.9	▼2.3	15,395	11.5	▼1.9
Left	Hans-Joachim Ehnes	5,611	4.2	▼2.0	5,840	4.4	▼2.2
AfD	Siegfried Ermer	4,393	3.3		5,590	4.2	
FW	Axel Rogner	4,079	3.0		3,684	2.7	
Pirates	Andreas Waas	3,216	2.4		3,311	2.5	▼0.6
FDP	Michael Székely	2,990	2.2	▼7.2	7,440	5.5	▼9.3
ÖDP					1,144	0.9	0.0
NPD	Axel Michaelis	957	0.7	▼0.5	917	0.7	▼0.3
Tierschutzpartei					901	0.7	▲0.1
BP		569	0.4		507	0.4	▲0.1
REP					289	0.2	▼0.2
DIE FRAUEN					222	0.2	
DIE VIOLETTEN					126	0.1	▼0.1
Party of Reason					113	0.1	
PRO					70	0.1	
RRP					51	0.0	▼0.7
MLPD					45	0.0	0.0
BüSo					26	0.0	0.0
Informal votes		863			937		
Total valid votes		134,323			134,249		
Turnout		135,186	75.3	▼1.3			
CSU hold	Majority	29,774	22.2	▲1.1			

=== 2009 election ===
Federal election (2009): Erlangen
Notes:	Blue background denotes the winner of the electorate vote. Pink background denotes a candidate elected from their party list. Yellow background denotes an electorate win by a list member, or other incumbent. A ✓ or ✗ denotes status of any incumbent, win or lose respectively.						
Party	Candidate	Votes	%	±%	Party votes	%	±%
CSU	✓ Stefan Müller	60,685	45.1	▼2.3	48,552	36.0	▼5.4
SPD	Martina Stamm-Fibich	32,269	24.0	▼15.5	28,248	21.0	▼10.9
Greens	Lutz Bräutigam	15,036	11.2	▲6.0	18,043	13.4	▲2.8
FDP	Britta Dassler	12,736	9.5	▲5.9	20,048	14.9	▲5.4
Left	Hans-Joachim Ehnes	8,275	6.2	▲3.9	8,821	6.5	▲3.2
Pirates					4,096	3.0	
FAMILIE	René Ohnemüller	1,946	1.4		1,095	0.8	▲0.3
ÖDP	Manfred Reinhart	1,686	1.3		1,177	0.9	
NPD	Christine Rorich	1,596	1.2	▼0.1	1,362	1.0	▼0.1
RRP					994	0.7	
Tierschutzpartei					794	0.6	
REP					596	0.4	0.0
BP					308	0.2	0.0
Independent	Inge Schramm	281	0.2				
DIE VIOLETTEN					210	0.2	
PBC					208	0.2	▼0.2
CM					70	0.1	
DVU					50	0.0	
MLPD					45	0.0	0.0
BüSo					37	0.0	▼0.1
Informal votes		1,335			1,091		
Total valid votes		134,510			134,754		
Turnout		135,845	76.6	▼4.4			
CSU hold	Majority	28,416	21.1	▲13.2			

=== 2005 election ===
Federal election (2005):Erlangen
Notes:	Blue background denotes the winner of the electorate vote. Pink background denotes a candidate elected from their party list. Yellow background denotes an electorate win by a list member, or other incumbent. A ✓ or ✗ denotes status of any incumbent, win or lose respectively.						
Party	Candidate	Votes	%	±%	Party votes	%	±%
CSU	✓ Stefan Müller	65,612	47.4	▼1.9	57,370	41.5	▼6.5
SPD	Renate Schmidt	54,726	39.5	0.0	44,033	31.8	▼1.4
Greens	Berthold Lausen	7,203	5.2	▲0.2	14,723	10.6	0.0
FDP	Jörg Rohde	4,913	3.5	▼0.5	13,184	9.5	▲4.2
Left	Stefan Wolf	3,113	2.2	▲1.6	4,574	3.3	▲2.5
NPD	Martin Paulus	1,799	1.3		1,553	1.1	▲0.8
REP					648	0.5	▲0.1
PBC	Friedhold Hindrichs	564	0.4	0.0	437	0.3	▲0.1
BüSo	Kurt Blumör	477	0.3		170	0.1	▲0.1
Familie					695	0.5	
GRAUEN					406	0.3	▲0.2
BP					279	0.2	▲0.2
Feminist					256	0.2	▲0.1
MLPD					68	0.0	
Informal votes		1,470			1,481		
Total valid votes		138,407			138,396		
Turnout		139,877	81.0	▼2.8			
CSU hold	Majority	10,886	7.9				
