= Dagmar Wöhrl =

German politician

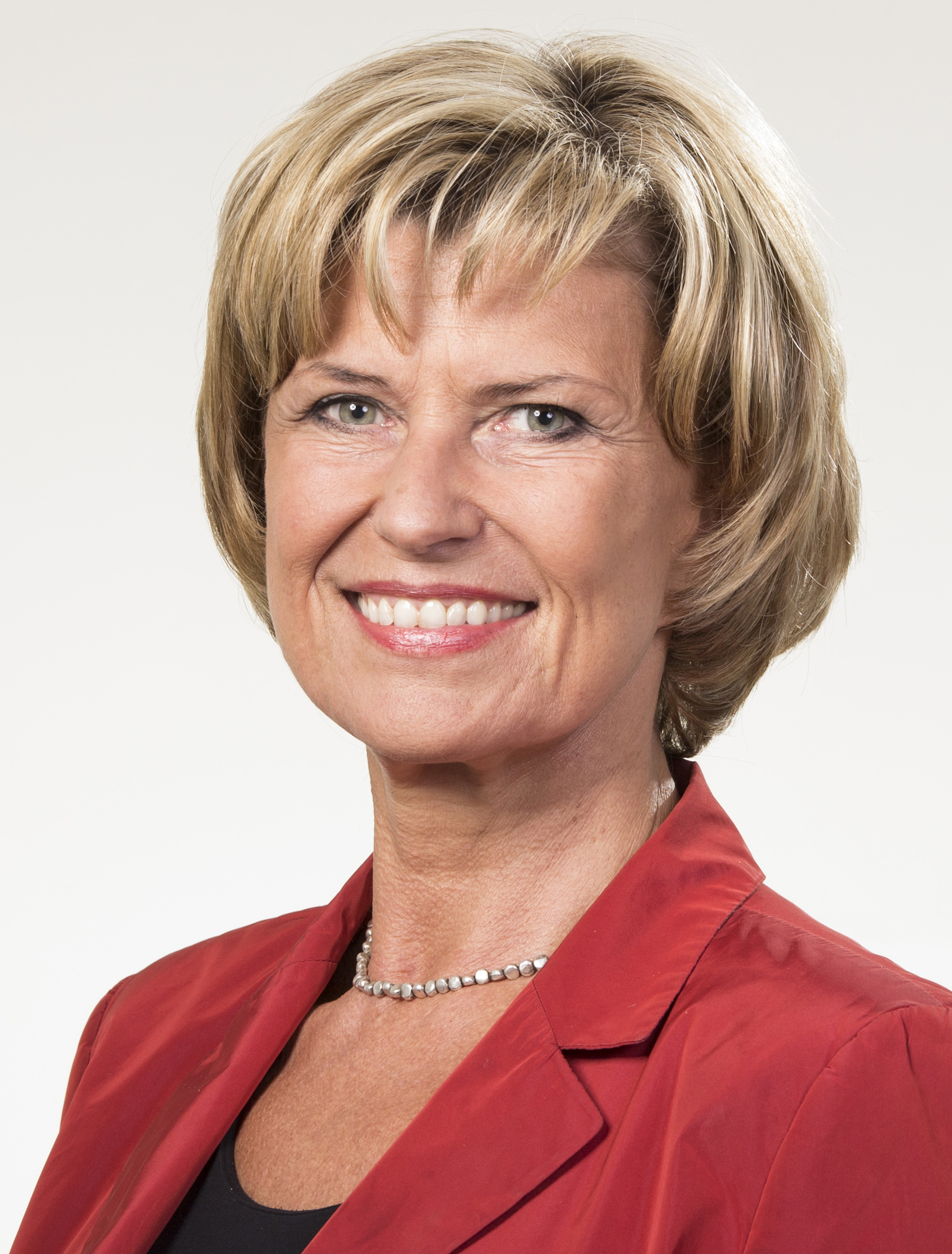
- Wöhrl in 2012

Member of the Bundestag; from Bavaria
- In office 10 November 1994 – 24 October 2017
- Preceded by: Renate Schmidt
- Succeeded by: Sebastian Brehm
- Constituency: Nuremberg North (1994–1998); State list (1998–2002); Nuremberg North (2002–2017)

Personal details
- Born: Dagmar Gabriele Winkler; 5 May 1954 (age 72) Stein, Bavaria, West Germany
- Party: Christian Social Union
- Spouse: Hans Rudolf Wöhrl (m. 1984)
- Children: 2
- Education: University of Erlangen-Nuremberg

Dagmar Gabriele Wöhrl (née Winkler; born 5 May 1954) is a German politician of the Christian Social Union in Bavaria (CSU). She was elected to the German Bundestag six times, serving from 1994 to her retirement in 2017. From 2005 until 2009 she was a Parliamentary State Secretary in the Federal Ministry of Economics and Technology. She has served as Chairwoman of the Committee for Economic Cooperation and Development of the German Bundestag. She was also a member of the 'Parliamentary Friendship Group for Relations with Arabic-Speaking States' in the Middle East.

In her youth Wöhrl participated in beauty pageants, winning the title of Miss Germany in 1977. She finished first runner-up in the Miss International 1977 and Miss Europe 1977 competitions and second runner-up in the Miss World 1977 competition.

Wöhrl is a member of UNICEF National Committee of Germany.

== Early life and career ==
Born in Stein, Bavaria, Wöhrl represented Germany in various beauty pageants: the 1973 Miss Universe beauty pageant where she did not place; the Miss International 1977 beauty pageant where she placed as first runner-up; the Miss World 1977 beauty pageant (after she won the Miss Germany beauty pageant 1977) where she placed as second runner-up; and the 1977 Miss Europe beauty pageant (held in March 1978 having been postponed in 1977, yet still called Miss Europe 1977) where she placed as first runner-up.

== Political career ==
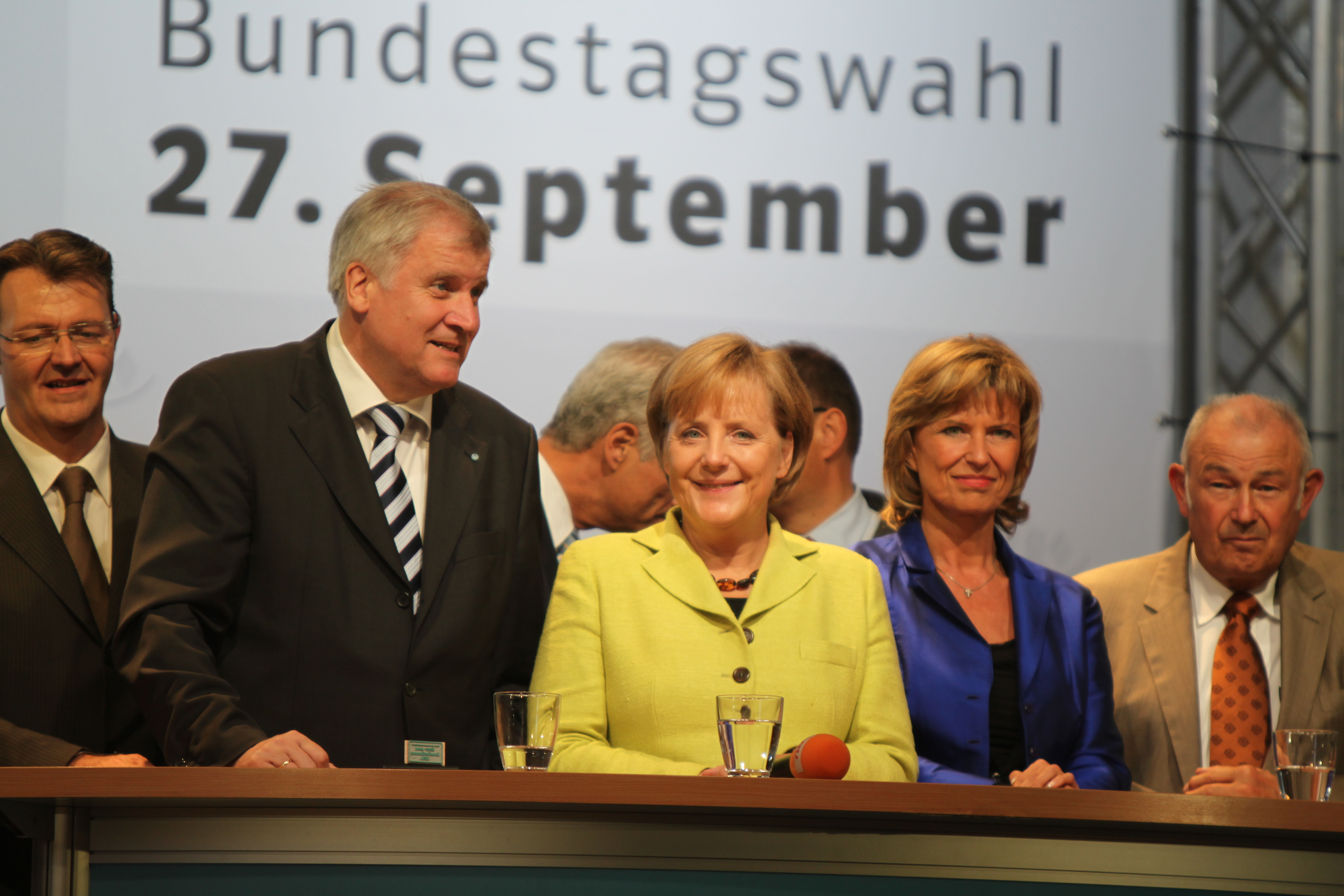
Wöhrl (right) with members of her party at the Germany federal election

In 1994, 1998, 2002, 2005, 2009 and 2013, Wöhrl was elected to the German Bundestag, representing Nuremberg North. In the first government of Chancellor Angela Merkel between 2005 and 2009, she served as Parliamentary State Secretary in the Federal Ministry of Economics and Technology under ministers Michael Glos (2005–2009) and Karl-Theodor zu Guttenberg (2009).

In the negotiations to form a coalition government following the 2009 federal elections, Wöhrl was part of the CDU/CSU delegation in the working group on economic affairs and energy policy, led by Guttenberg and Rainer Brüderle. She later served as Chairwoman of the Committee for Economic Cooperation and Development of the German Bundestag. She was also a member of the 'Parliamentary Friendship Group for Relations with Arabic-Speaking States' in the Middle East, which is in charge of maintaining inter-parliamentary relations with Bahrain, Irak, Yemen, Jordan, Qatar, Kuwait, Lebanon, Oman, Saudi Arabia, Syria, United Arab Emirates, and the Palestinian territories.

From 2009, Wöhrl also served on the Committee on Cultural and Media Affairs, where she was her parliamentary group's rapporteur on creative industries.

In March 2015, Wöhrl accompanied German President Joachim Gauck on a state visit to Peru. In addition, she joined the delegations of Federal Minister of Economic Cooperation and Development Gerd Müller to Nigeria (2014), Ghana (2015), Liberia (2015) and the Central African Republic (2015).

In April 2016, Wöhrl announced that she would not stand in the 2017 federal elections but instead resign from active politics by the end of the parliamentary term.

== Political positions ==
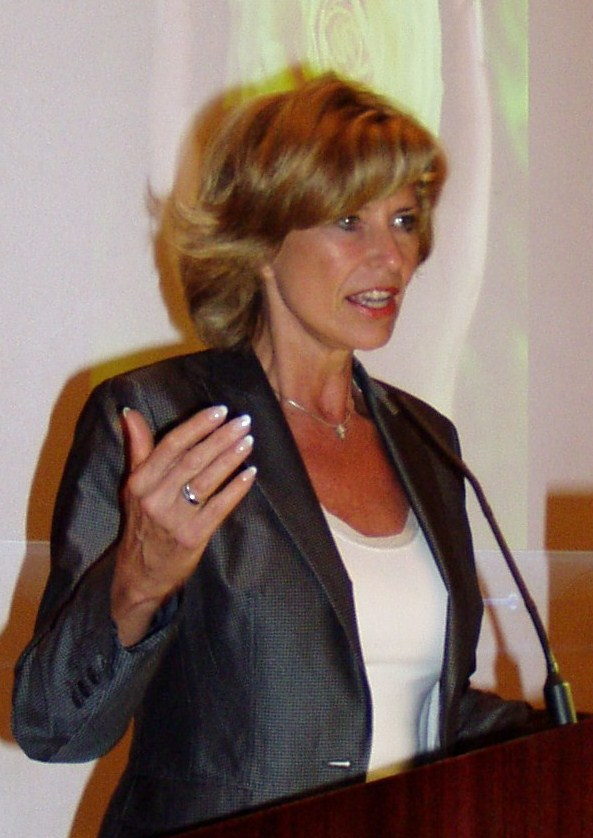
Wöhrl in 2008

=== Development policy ===
When several Western countries froze their official development assistance for Uganda in response to the country's Anti-Homosexuality Act in 2014, Wöhrl warned that "stopping all the aid would only hit the poorest of poor once again."

=== Peace-keeping on the African continent ===
During her time in parliament, Wöhrl voted in favor of German participation in United Nations peacekeeping missions as well as in United Nations-mandated European Union peacekeeping missions on the African continent, such as in Somalia – both Operation Atalanta and EUTM Somalia – (2009, 2010, 2012, 2013, 2014 and 2015), Darfur/Sudan (2010, 2011, 2012, 2013, 2014 and 2015), South Sudan (2011, 2012, 2013, 2014 and 2015), Mali – both EUTM Mali and MINUSMA – (2013, 2014, 2015 and 2016), the Central African Republic (2014), and Liberia (2015). She abstained from the vote on extending the mandate for Operation Atalanta in 2011.

=== European integration ===
On 27 February 2015, Wöhrl voted against the Merkel government's proposal for a four-month extension of Greece's bailout; in doing so, she joined a record number of 29 dissenters from the CDU/CSU parliamentary group who expressed skepticism about whether the Greek government under Prime Minister Alexis Tsipras could be trusted to deliver on its reform pledges. On 17 July, she voted against the government's proposal to negotiate a third bailout for Greece.

== Other activities ==
=== Television appearances ===
By early 2017, media reported that Wöhrl would be joining the jury of Die Höhle der Löwen, a VOX reality television format featuring entrepreneurs pitching their business ideas in order to secure investment finance from a panel of venture capitalists.

=== Corporate boards (selection) ===
- Bank J. Safra Sarasin, Member of the Supervisory Board
- DORMERO Hotel AG, Member of the Supervisory Board
- Nürnberger Krankenversicherung, Member of the Supervisory Board
- Nürnberger Lebensversicherung, Member of the Supervisory Board
- GIZ, Member of the Supervisory Board (–2017)
- Deutschlandradio, Member of the Supervisory Board (–2017)
- German Federal Film Board (FFA), Member of the Supervisory Board (–2017)
- German Investment and Development Corporation (DEG), Member of the Supervisory Board (2005–2009)
- Bank Sarasin AG, Frankfurt/Main, Member of the Advisory Board (2009–2013)
- Nürnberger Allgemeine Versicherungs-AG, Member of the Supervisory Board (2009–2011)

=== Non-profit organizations (selection) ===
- German Association for Small and Medium-Sized Businesses (BVMW), Member of the Advisory Board
- Cultural and Social Foundation International Young Orchestra Academy, Member of the Board of Trustees
- Chamber of Commerce and Industry of Nuremberg, Member of the General Meeting
- Hochschule für Musik Nürnberg, Member of the University Council
- Memorial to the Murdered Jews of Europe, Member of the Board of Trustees
- Tarabya Academy, Member of the Advisory Board (–2017)
- Center for European Economic Research (ZEW), Member of the Board of Trustees (2005–2009)
- Aktion Deutschland Hilft (Germany's Relief Coalition), Member of the Board of Trustees (–2017)
- UNICEF National Committee of Germany, Member
- Bavarian AIDS Foundation, Member of the Board of Trustees
- Franconian International School, Member of the Board of Trustees (2009–2013)

== Personal life ==
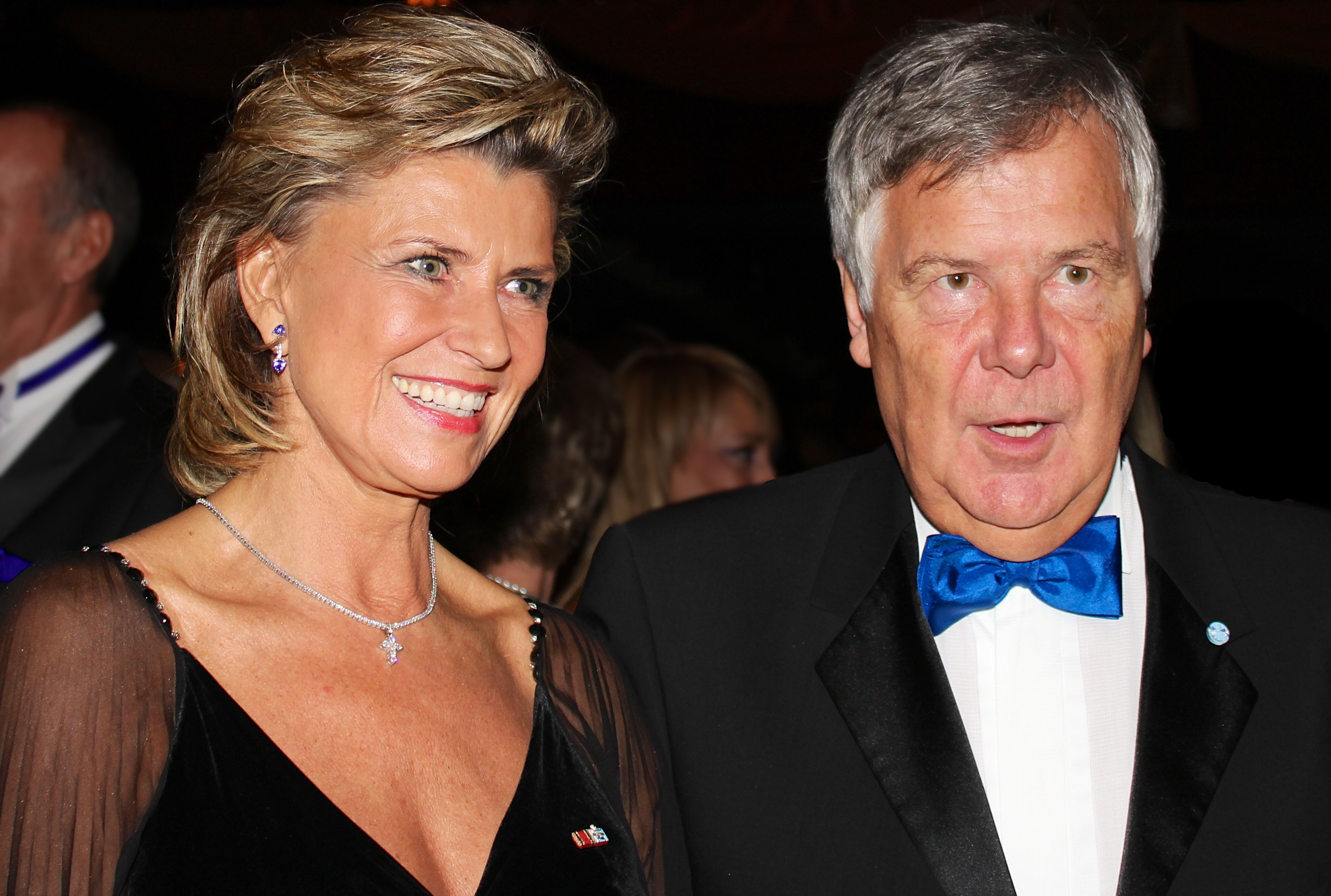
Wöhrl with her husband in 2013

Wöhrl is married to the German CEO Hans Rudolf Wöhrl. In 2001, she was subject of much media coverage after her younger son Emanuel died because of an accident. Her older son Marcus ran for the European Parliament in 2004.
