= Stefan Müller (politician) =

German politician (born 1975)

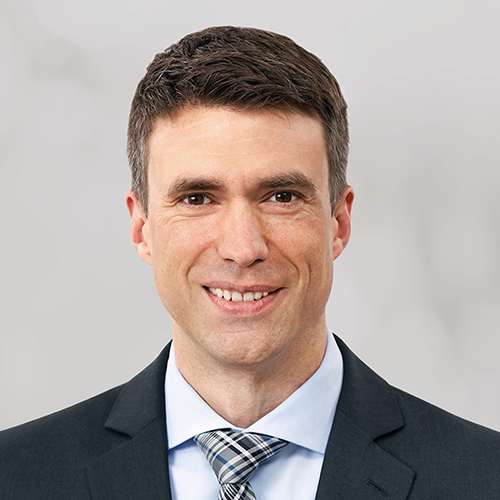
- Müller in 2017

Member of the Bundestag; for Erlangen
- In office 17 October 2002 – 31 May 2024
- Preceded by: Gerhard Friedrich
- Succeeded by: Konrad Körner

Personal details
- Born: 3 September 1975 (age 51) Neustadt an der Aisch, West Germany
- Party: Christian Social Union
- Children: 1
- Education: Frankfurt School of Finance & Management

Stefan Müller (born 3 September 1975) is a German politician of the Christian Social Union (CSU) has been serving as a member of the Bundestag from the state of Bavaria since 2002 to 31 May 2024.

In addition to his parliamentary mandate, Müller served as one of two Parliamentary State Secretaries at the Federal Ministry of Education and Research in the government of Chancellor Angela Merkel from 2013 until 2018.

== Political career ==
Müller became a member of the Bundestag in the 2002 German federal election, representing the Erlangen district. In parliament, he has served on the Finance Committee (2002–2005); the Committee on Labour and Social Affairs (2005–2009); the Committee for Education, Research and Technology Assessment (2005–2009); and the Subcommittee on European Affairs (2005–2009). In addition to his committee assignments, he is part of the German Parliamentary Friendship Group for Relations with the Cono Sur States.

In the negotiations to form a coalition government following the 2009 federal elections, Müller was part of the working group on education and research, led by Annette Schavan and Andreas Pinkwart.

From 2009 until 2013 and since 2018, Müller has served on the Council of Elders, which – among other duties – determines daily legislative agenda items and assigns committee chairpersons based on party representation.

In the negotiations to form a fourth coalition government under Merkel following the 2017 federal elections, Müller led the working group on education policy, alongside Annegret Kramp-Karrenbauer, Manuela Schwesig and Hubertus Heil. Also since 2018, he has been a member of the parliamentary executive of the CSU state group.

== Later career ==
In December 2023, Müller announced that he would not stand in the 2025 federal elections but instead resign from active politics by mid-2024 to become the president of the Bavarian Association of Cooperative Banks (GVB).

In 2025, the government of Chancellor Friedrich Merz appointed Müller as co-chair – alongside Eckhardt Rehberg and Stephan Weil – of an expert commission to advise Minister of Finance Lars Klingbeil on reforming Germany's rules on public debt.

== Other activities ==
=== Corporate boards ===
- Deutsche Bahn, Member of the Supervisory Board (2018-2019)
- DZ Bank, Member of the Advisory Board (2009-2013)
- Nürnberger Krankenversicherung, Member of the Supervisory Board (2009-2013)

=== Non-profit organizations ===
- University of Erlangen-Nuremberg (FAU), Member of the Board of Trustees (since 2009)
- Bavarian Research Center for Interreligious Discourses (BaFID), Member of the Board of Trustees
- German Foundation for Peace Research (DSF), Member of the Board of Trustees (2014-2018)
- German Institute for Economic Research (DIW), Member of the Board of Trustees (2014-2018)
- Stiftung Lesen, Member of the Board of Trustees (2014-2018)
- Confucius Institute Nuremberg, Member of the Board of Trustees (2009-2013)
- Franconian International School (FIS), Member of the Board of Trustees (2009-2013)
