= Sebastian Brehm =

German politician

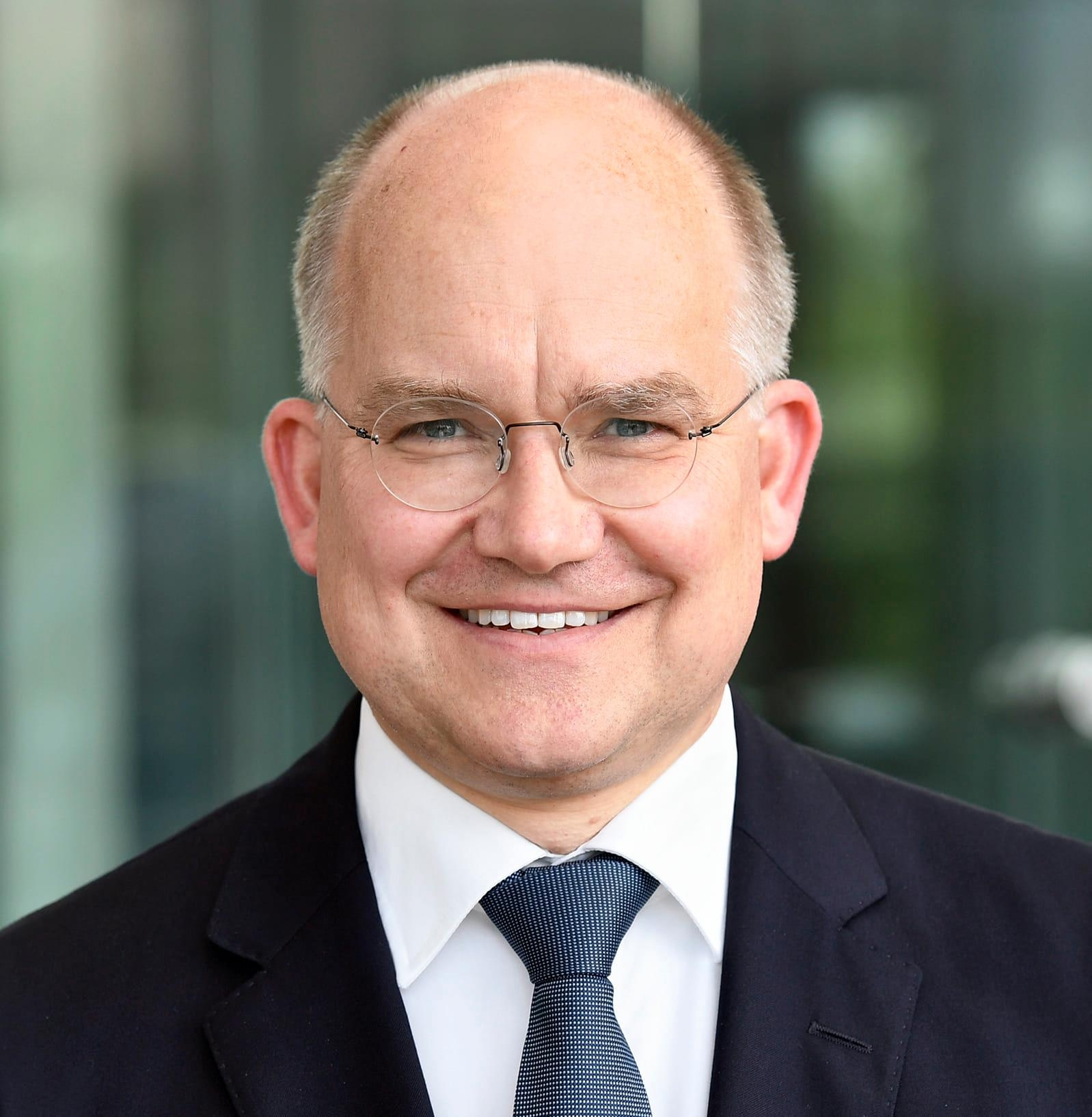
- Brehm in 2021

Member of the Bundestag; for Nuremberg North
- In office 24 October 2017 – 25 March 2025
- Preceded by: Dagmar Wöhrl
- Succeeded by: Seat vacant

Personal details
- Born: 18 October 1971 (age 54) Nuremberg, West Germany
- Party: Christian Social Union
- Children: 2
- Education: University of Erlangen–Nuremberg

Sebastian Brehm (born 18 October 1971) is a German tax advisor and politician of the Christian Social Union (CSU) who served as a member of the Bundestag from the state of Bavaria from 2017 to 2025.

== Early life and career ==
After graduating from high school in 1991 in Nuremberg, he completed his military service in Amberg from 1991 to 1992. He then studied business administration at the University of Erlangen-Nuremberg from 1992 to 1998, graduating as a Diplom-Kaufmann. In 2002, he was appointed as a tax consultant by the Nuremberg Chamber of Tax Advisors and has been working as a self-employed tax consultant in Nuremberg since 2003.

His political engagement began in his youth: in 1988, he joined the Young Union and the CSU. From 1990 to 1992, he served as the chairman of the Schüler Union Nürnberg. From 2002 to 2017, he was a member of the Nuremberg City Council, and from 2009 to 2017, he held the position of faction leader of the CSU in the Nuremberg City Council.

== Political career ==
Brehm became a member of the Bundestag in the 2017 German federal election. He is a member of the Finance Committee and the Committee on Human Rights and Humanitarian Aid. In that capacity, he is his parliamentary group's rapporteur on human rights issues in Russia, Ukraine, Belarus, Moldova, Romania and Bulgaria, among others.

Within his parliamentary group, Brehm coordinates the CSU parliamentarians’ legislative activities on financial policy.

In 2019, German media reported that Brehm was the parliamentarian who reported the highest income from activities unrelated to his mandate that year with €1,383,500.

Since 2021, Brehm has been serving as one of two treasurers of the CSU, under the leadership of chairman Markus Söder.

== Other activities ==
=== Government agencies ===
- Federal Agency for Civic Education (BPB), Member of the Board of Trustees (2018–2021)

=== Non-profit organizations ===
- German Red Cross (DRK), Member (since 2005)
- Rotary International, Member (since 2003)

== Political positions ==
In September 2020, Brehm was one of 15 members of his parliamentary group who joined Norbert Röttgen in writing an open letter to Minister of the Interior Horst Seehofer which called on Germany and other EU counties to take in 5000 immigrants who were left without shelter after fires gutted the overcrowded Mória Reception and Identification Centre on the Greek island of Lesbos.
