= Konrad Körner =

German politician (born 1992)

Konrad Körner MdB

Member of the Bundestag; for Erlangen
- Incumbent
- Assumed office 25 March 2025
- Preceded by: Stefan Müller

Personal details
- Born: 27 April 1992 (age 34) Fürth, Germany
- Party: Christian Social Union
- Education: University of Erlangen–Nuremberg; Speyer University

Konrad Körner (born 27 April 1992) is a German politician who was elected as a member of the Bundestag in 2025. He has served as chairman of the Young Union in Middle Franconia since 2017.
