= Miss World 1977 =

27th Miss World pageant

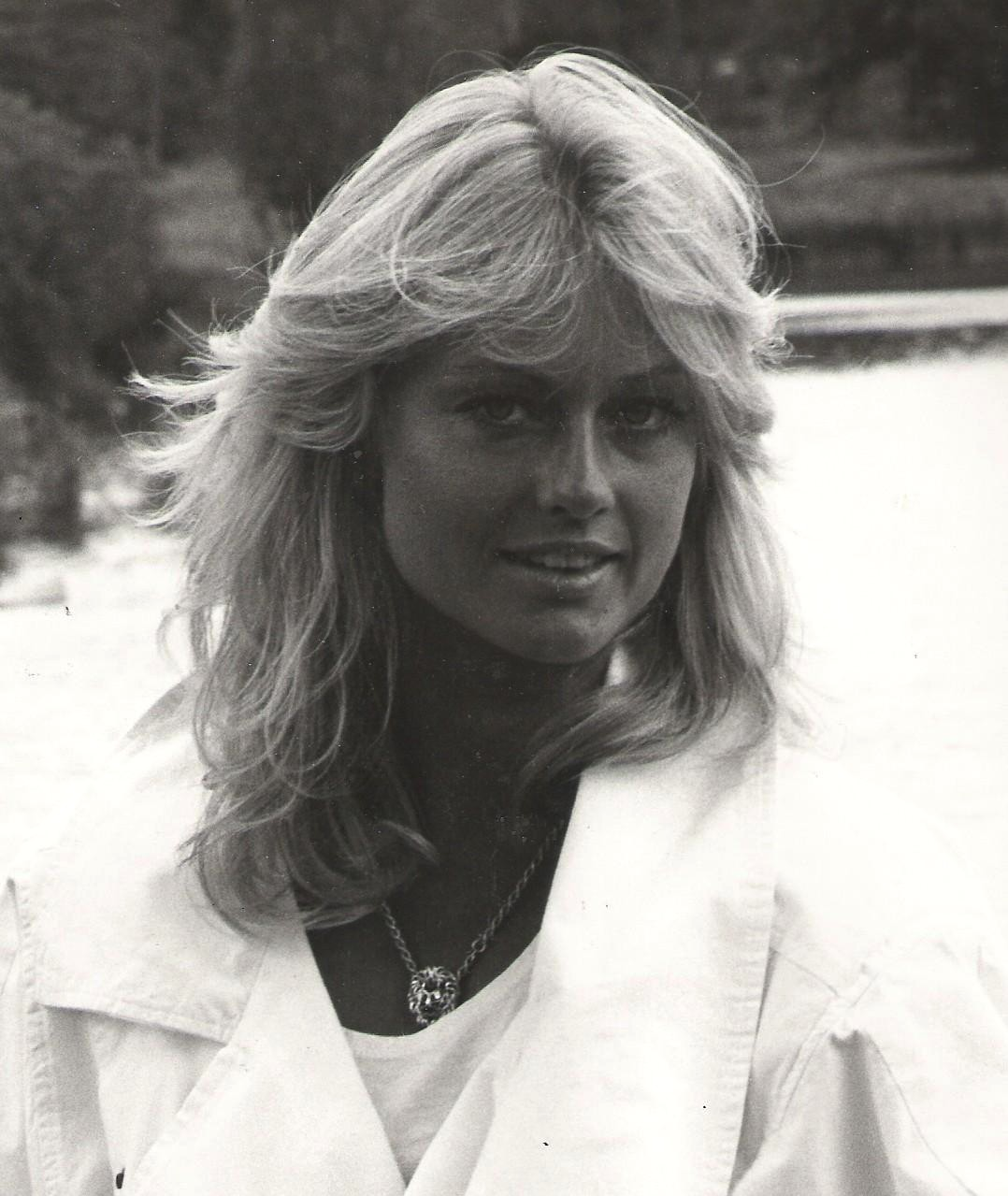
- Mary Stävin
- Date: 17 November 1977
- Presenters: Ray Moore; Andy Williams
- Venue: Royal Albert Hall, London, United Kingdom
- Broadcaster: BBC
- Entrants: 62
- Placements: 15
- Debuts: Cayman Islands; Isle of Man; Papua New Guinea; Western Samoa
- Withdrawals: Guatemala; Italy; Jamaica; Singapore; United States Virgin Islands
- Returns: Bolivia; Nicaragua; Panama; Sri Lanka
- Winner: Mary Stävin; Sweden

Miss World 1977 was the 27th edition of the Miss World pageant, held on 17 November 1977 at the Royal Albert Hall in London, United Kingdom.

At the end of the event, Mary Stävin of Sweden was crowned Miss World 1977 by Cindy Breakspeare of Jamaica, she was the third Swedish woman to win the title. The first runner-up was Ineke Berends representing Holland, while the second runner-up was Dagmar Winkler from West Germany, the third runner-up was Madalena Sbaraini of Brazil, and the fourth runner-up was Cindy Darlene Miller from the United States. Stävin was awarded a $37,000 cash prize as the winner of the pageant.

== Selection of participants ==
=== Replacements ===
Miss New Zealand 1977, Donna Schultz, was replaced by Michelle Hyde due to unknown reasons. Janice Galea of Malta withdrew from the competition due to age requirements, because her age was similar to Miss Italy before the pageant. At the last minute, she was replaced by her first runner-up, Pauline Lewise Farrugia.

=== Debuts, returns, and withdrawals ===
This edition marked the debut of Cayman Islands, Isle of Man, Papua New Guinea and Western Samoa. And the return of Bolivia, Nicaragua, Panama and Sri Lanka; Panama, which last competed in 1971 and Bolivia, Nicaragua and Sri Lanka last competed in 1975.

Guatemala and the United States Virgin Islands, withdrew from the competition for unknown reasons. Anna Maria Kanakis of Italy, was disqualified from the pageant, because organizers discovered that she was underage. Sandra Kong of Jamaica and Veronica Lourdes of Singapore both withdrew from the competition due to protest against the presence of Miss South Africa. Additionally, the Black representative from South Africa, who competed under the name “Africa South”, also withdrew from the pageant. (Note: The local pageant renamed Miss Black South Africa and withdrew) Contestants who withdrew in protest against the presence of Miss South Africa; Veena Prakash of India, Siti Mirza Nuria Arifin of Indonesia, Welma Campbell of Liberia, Ingrid Desmarais of Mauritius, Ana Melissa "Peachy" Ofilada Veneracion of the Philippines, Zanella Tutu Tshabalala of Swaziland and Svetlana Višnjić of Yugoslavia.

== Results ==
=== Placements ===
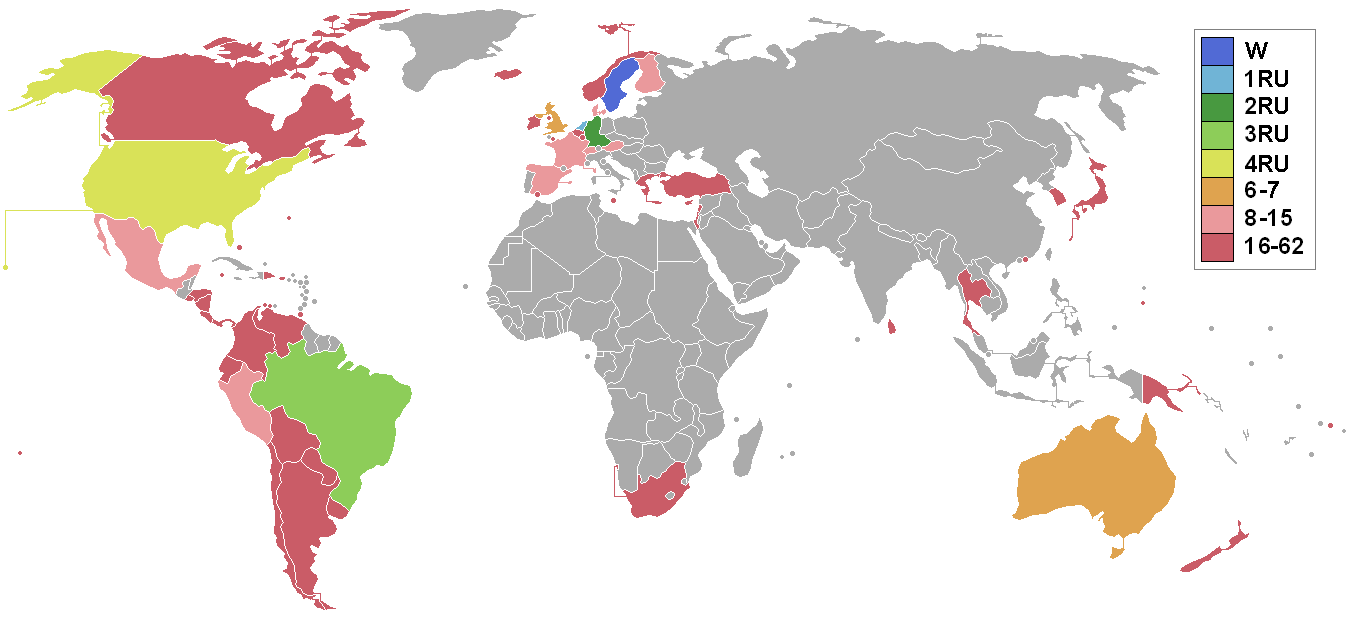
Countries and territories which sent delegates and results for Miss World 1977

Placement	Contestant
Miss World 1977	Sweden – Mary Stävin
1st runner-up	Holland – Ineke Berends
2nd runner-up	West Germany – Dagmar Winkler
3rd runner-up	Brazil – Madalena Sbaraini
4th runner-up	United States – Cindy Darlene Miller
Top 7	Australia – Jaye Hopewell; United Kingdom – Madeleine Stringer
Top 15	Austria – Eva Maria Düringer; Denmark – Annette Simonsen; Finland – Asta Seppälä; France – Véronique Fagot; Mexico – Elizabeth Aguilar; Peru – Isabel Frías; Spain – Guillermina Ruiz; Switzerland – Daniela Häberli

== Judges ==
A panel of ten judges evaluated the performances of the sixty-two contestants. They were:

- Maurice Hope - boxer
- Oliver Tobias - actor
- Micky Dolenz - actor, musician and vocalist
- Robert Powell - actor
- Dr. Reita Faria - Miss World 1966 from India
- Eric Morley (chairman) - president of Mecca Leisure Group, Variety International
- Joan Collins - actress
- Claude François - singer
- Barry Sheene - motorcyclist
- Cynthia Wetzell - sponsor from Samoa

== Contestants ==
62 contestants competed for the title.

Country/Territory	Contestant	Age	Hometown
Argentina	Susana Stéfano	20	Salta
Aruba	Helene Croes	19	Oranjestad
Australia	Jaye Hopewell	18	Perth
Austria	Eva Maria Düringer	18	Bodensee
Bahamas	Laurie Lee Joseph	17	Nassau
Belgium	Claudine Vasseur	18	Brussels
Bermuda	Connie Frith	23	St. George's Parish
Bolivia	Elizabeth Yanone	17	Santa Cruz de la Sierra
Brazil	Madalena Sbaraini	21	Porto Alegre
Canada	Marianne McKeen	23	Comber
Cayman Islands	Patricia Jackson-Patiño	18	Grand Cayman
Chile	Annie Garling	17	Santiago
Colombia	María Clara O'Byrne	20	Atlántico
Costa Rica	Carmen Núñez	17	San José
Curaçao	Xiomara Winklaar	19	Willemstad
Cyprus	Georgia Georgiou	23	Nicosia
Denmark	Annette Simonsen	16	Copenhagen
Dominican Republic	Jacqueline Hernández	20	Santo Domingo
Ecuador	Lucía Hernández	18	Chone
El Salvador	Magaly Varela	19	San Salvador
Finland	Asta Seppälä	20	Helsinki
France	Véronique Fagot	18	Poitou
French Polynesia (Note: Competed as Tahiti in the pageant)	Therese Amo	18	Papeete
Gibraltar	Lourdes Holmes	18	Gibraltar
Greece	Lina Ioannou	24	Athens
Guam	Diane Haun	17	Yigo
Holland	Ineke Berends	25	Amsterdam
Honduras	Marlene Villela	21	Tegucigalpa
Hong Kong	Ada Lui	18	Hong Kong
Iceland	Sigurlaug Halldórsdóttir	18	Reykjavík
Ireland	Lorraine Enriquez	18	Dublin
Isle of Man	Helen Shimmin	20	Douglas
Israel	Ya'el Hovav	21	Jerusalem
Japan	Chizuru Shigemura	22	Saitama
Jersey	Blodwen Pritchard	18	St. Helier
Lebanon	Vera Alouane	18	Beirut
Luxembourg	Jeannette Colling	23	Luxembourg City
Malta	Pauline Farrugia	21	Żebbuġ
Mexico	Elizabeth Aguilar	22	Ameca
New Zealand	Michelle Hyde	21	Wellington
Nicaragua	Beatriz Obregón	18	Rivas
Norway	Åshild Ottesen	22	Oslo
Panama	Anabelle Vallarino	19	Panama City
Papua New Guinea	Sayah Karakuru	24	Port Moresby
Paraguay	María Elizabeth Giardina	21	Asunción
Peru	Isabel Frías	22	Cajamarca
Puerto Rico	Didriana del Río	17	Santurce
South Africa	Vanessa Wannenburg	21	Johannesburg
South Korea (Note: Competed as Korea in the pageant)	Kim Soon-ae	17	Seoul
Spain	Guillermina Ruiz	21	Barcelona
Sri Lanka	Sharmini Senaratna	19	Colombo
Sweden	Mary Stävin	20	Örebro
Switzerland	Daniela Häberli	19	Zürich
Thailand	Siriporn Savanglum	17	Bangkok
Trinidad and Tobago	Marlene Villafana	20	Port of Spain
Turkey	Kamer Bulutöte	22	Istanbul
United Kingdom	Madeleine Stringer	24	North Shields
United States	Cindy Darlene Miller	20	Chesapeake
Uruguay	Adriana Umpierre	20	Montevideo
Venezuela	Jackeline van den Branden	22	Caracas
West Germany	Dagmar Winkler	23	Nuremberg
Western Samoa	Ana Decima Schmidt	21	Apia

== Notes ==
.
