= Oscar Schneider =

German politician (1927–2024)

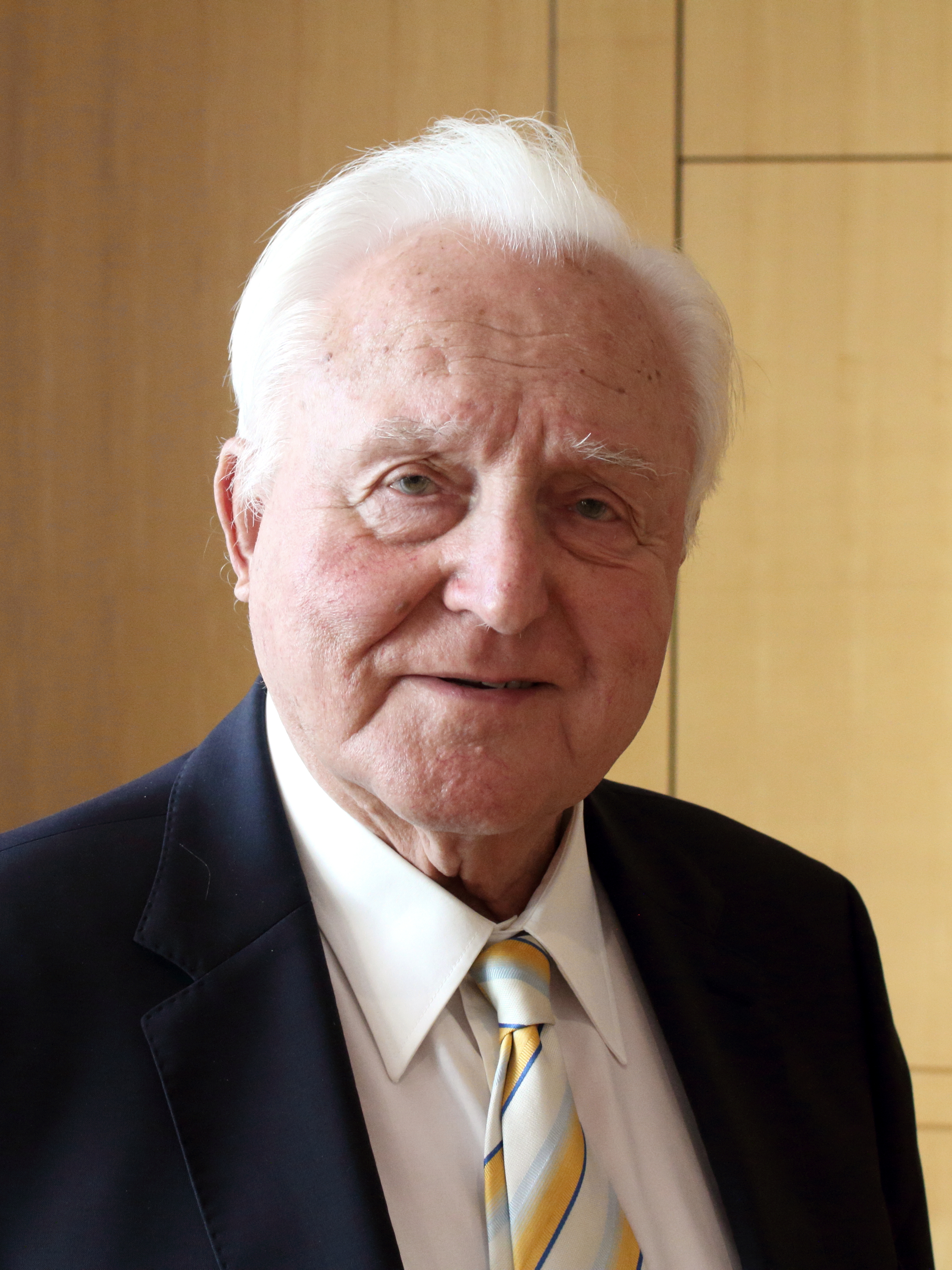
- Schneider in 2015

Minister for Regional Planning, Building and Urban Development
- In office 1 October 1982 – 21 April 1989
- Chancellor: Helmut Kohl
- Preceded by: Dieter Haack
- Succeeded by: Gerda Hasselfeldt

Member of the Bundestag; from Bavaria
- In office 20 October 1969 – 10 November 1994
- Constituency: State list (1969–1983); Nuremberg North (1983–1990); State list (1990–1994)

Personal details
- Born: 3 June 1927 Heideck, Germany
- Died: 29 December 2024 (aged 97)
- Party: Christian Social Union
- Children: 2
- Education: University of Würzburg

Oscar Schneider (3 June 1927 – 29 December 2024) was a German politician (CSU). From 1982 to 1989 he was Federal Minister for regional planning, Building and urban development.

== Background ==
Schneider was born on 3 June 1927 in Altenheideck in Middle Franconia as the son of a farmer in a family of 10 children. In addition to the farm, his father also owned a trucking company and a concrete block factory.

Schneider died on 29 December 2024, at the age of 97.

== World War II ==
In 1944 he was called up to the Reich Labour Service and the Air Force. The seventeen-year-old was wounded in the Battle of Berlin, but escaped towards Magdeburg on 29 April 1945. After a short American captivity, he was able to return home.

== Politics ==
Schneider was a member of the CSU from 1953. From 1957 to 1991 he was a member of its state board. He was also chairman of the CSU district association in Nuremberg-Fürth for many years. From 1956 he was a member of the Nuremberg city council and chairman of the CSU parliamentary group from 1960 to 1969. From 1966 to 1970 he was also a member of the Middle Franconian district council. From 1969 to 1994 he was a member of the German Bundestag. Here he was chairman of the committee for regional planning, construction and urban development from 1972 to 1982. From 1991 to 1994 he was cultural policy spokesman for the CDU/CSU parliamentary group. Schneider was most recently elected to the German Bundestag via the Bavarian state list (12th electoral term in 1990).
