= Martina Stamm-Fibich =

German politician

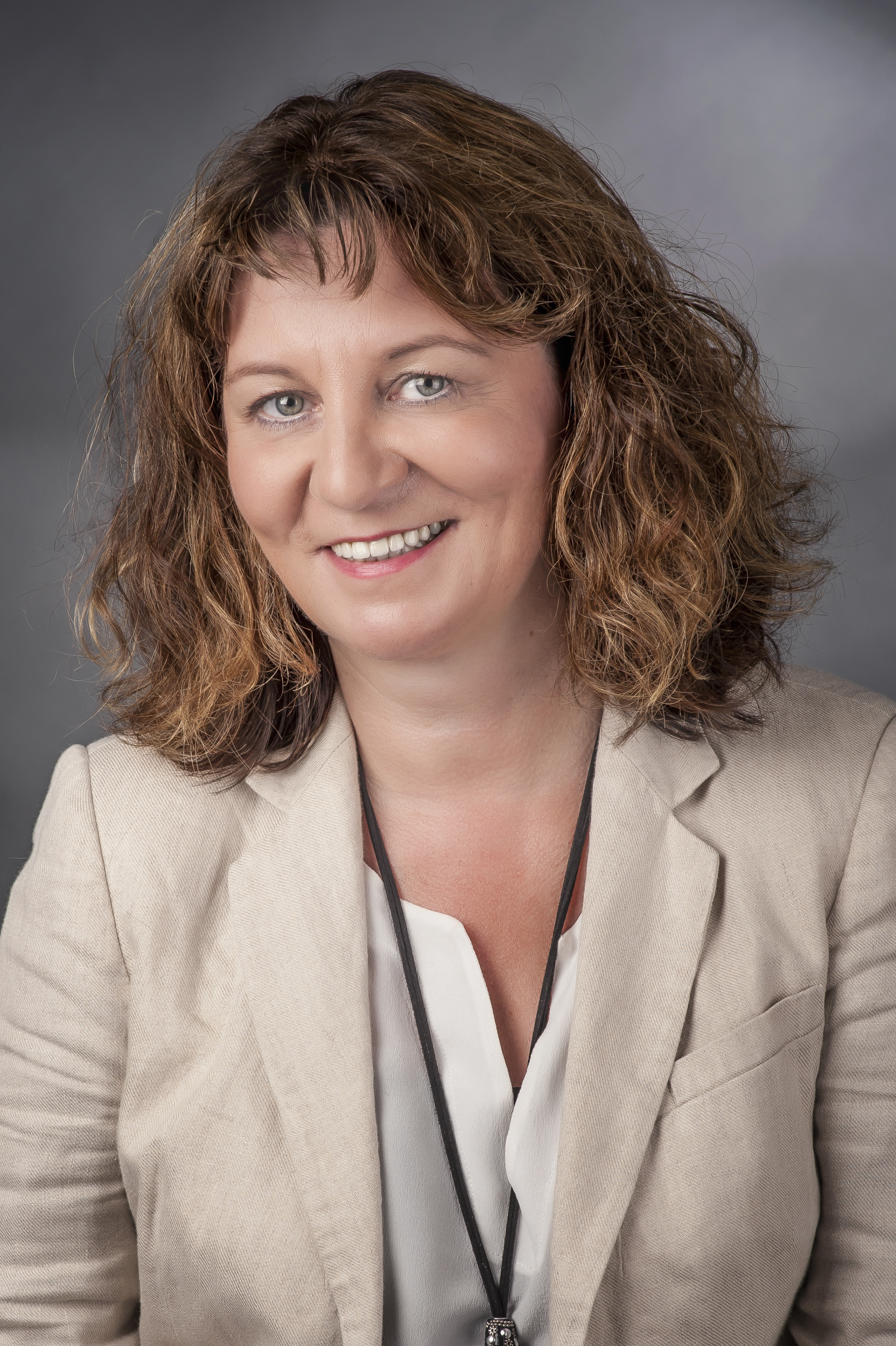
- Martina Stamm-Fibich in 2014

Member of the Bundestag
- Incumbent
- Assumed office 2013

Personal details
- Born: 23 April 1965 (age 60) Erlangen, West Germany (now Germany)
- Party: SPD

Martina Stamm-Fibich (born 23 April 1965) is a German politician of the Social Democratic Party (SPD) who has been serving as a member of the Bundestag from the state of Bavaria since 2013.

== Political career ==
Stamm-Fibich first became a member of the Bundestag in the 2013 German federal election. She contested the constituency of Erlangen in 2009, 2013, 2017 and 2021. She was re-elected at the 2021 German federal election.

In parliament, Stamm-Fibich serves as member of the Committee on Health and the Committee on Petitions, where she serves as her parliamentary group's rapporteur on pediatrics, medical devices and patients' rights.

In addition to her committee assignments, Stamm-Fibich has been an alternate member of the German delegation to the Parliamentary Assembly of the Council of Europe (PACE) since 2022. In the Assembly, she serves on the Committee on Social Affairs, Health and Sustainable Development and the Sub-Committee on Children.

Within the SPD parliamentary group, Stamm-Fibich belongs to the Parliamentary Left, a left-wing movement.
