= Katja Hessel =

German politician (born 1972)

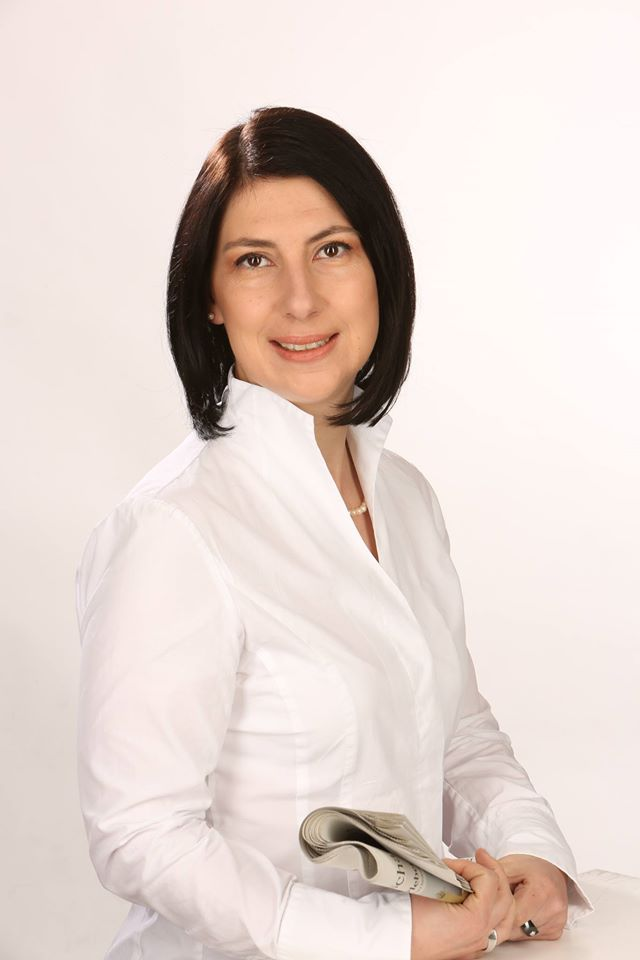
- Katja Hessel in 2016

Member of the Bundestag
- In office 2017–2025

Personal details
- Born: 5 May 1972 (age 54) Nürnberg, West Germany (now Germany)
- Party: FDP
- Education: University of Erlangen–Nuremberg

Katja Hessel (born 5 May 1972) is a German lawyer and politician of the Free Democratic Party (FDP) who has been serving as a member of the Bundestag from the state of Bavaria from 2017 to March 2025.

In addition to her parliamentary work, Hessel served as Parliamentary State Secretary in the Federal Ministry of Finance in the coalition government of Chancellor Olaf Scholz from 2021 to 2024.

== Early life and career ==
Hessel was born in Nuremberg in 1972. In 1991, she passed her Abitur and then studied law in Erlangen until 1996. She passed her first state examination in 1996 and her second in 1998.

Kessel started working as a lawyer in her own law firm in 1999 and became a tax consultant in 2002.

== Political career ==
In 1999, Hessel joined the FDP. She was a State Secretary in the Bavarian State Ministry of Economic Affairs, Infrastructure, Transport and Technology under minister Martin Zeil in the government of Minister-President Horst Seehofer from 2008 to 2013.

Hessel became a member of the Bundestag in the 2017 German federal election, representing the Nuremberg North district. From 2018 until 2021, she was a member of the Finance Committee, which she chaired from 2020.

In addition to her committee assignments, Hessel is part of the German-Japanese Parliamentary Friendship Group.

In the negotiations to form a so-called traffic light coalition of the Social Democratic Party (SPD), the Green Party and the FDP following the 2021 federal elections, Hessel was part of her party's delegation in the working group on financial regulation and the national budget, co-chaired by Doris Ahnen, Lisa Paus and Christian Dürr.

Since 2023, Hessel has been serving as co-chair of the FDP in Bavaria, alongside Martin Hagen.

== Other activities ==
=== Corporate boards ===
- Deutsche Telekom, Member of the Supervisory Board (since 2022)

=== Non-profit organizations ===
- Federal Foundation for the Reappraisal of the SED Dictatorship, Member of the Board of Trustees (since 2022)
- German Federal Environmental Foundation (DBU), Member of the Board of Trustees (since 2022)
- Max Planck Institute for Tax Law and Public Finance, Member of the Board of Trustees (since 2022)
- Kiwanis, Member
