= Elizabeth Aguilar =

Mexican actress and beauty pageant titleholder

- Born: Elizabeth Aguilar González; 18 August 1954 (age 72); Ameca, Jalisco, Mexico
- Education: National Autonomous University of Mexico
- Beauty pageant titleholder
- Major competitions: Señorita México 1977 (1st Runner-Up); Miss World 1977 (Top 15)

Elizabeth Aguilar González (born 18 August 1954) is a Mexican actress and beauty pageant titleholder who won Señorita Estado de México 1977. She represented Mexico at Miss World 1977 and reached the top 15.

== Early life ==
Aguilar was born on 18 August 1954 in Ameca, Jalisco. From childhood, she showed an inclination for the performing arts, participating in school festivals. After completing secondary school, Aguilar began studying dentistry but left as she had begun pageantry. Subsequently, she studied acting, dramaturgy, and Philosophy at the National Autonomous University of Mexico (UNAM).

== Career ==
Aguilar won her first title of Señorita Estado de México 1977 which led her to compete nationally for the Señorita México title, where she was the first runner-up. That same year, Aguilar represented Mexico at Miss World 1977, and reached the top 15.

Aguilar hosted the program Variedades de media noche in 1977, and then appeared on film and television. She posed for Playboy magazine in 1984, and was the first Mexican Playmate.

Awards and achievements
Preceded by Carla Reguera	Miss World Mexico; 1977	Succeeded by Martha Eugenia Ortíz
