= Harald Weinberg =

German politician

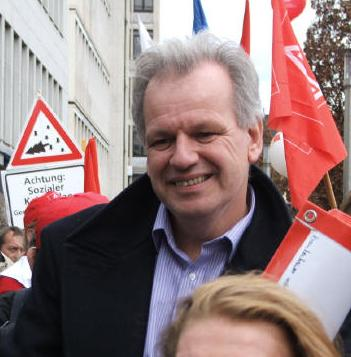
- Harald Weinberg in 2010

Member of the Bundestag
- Incumbent
- Assumed office 2009

Personal details
- Born: 13 February 1957 (age 69) Bad Godesberg, West Germany (now Germany)
- Party: The Left

Harald Weinberg (born 13 February 1957) is a German politician. Born in Bad Godesberg, North Rhine-Westphalia, he represents The Left. Harald Weinberg has served as a member of the Bundestag from the state of Bavaria since 2009.

== Life ==
Since 1986 he worked in market and opinion research at the Gesellschaft für Konsumforschung. From 2003 he was employed by an educational institution of the trade union ver.di. He became member of the bundestag after the 2009 German federal election. He is a member of the Health Committee.
