= Renate Schmidt =

German politician (born 1943)

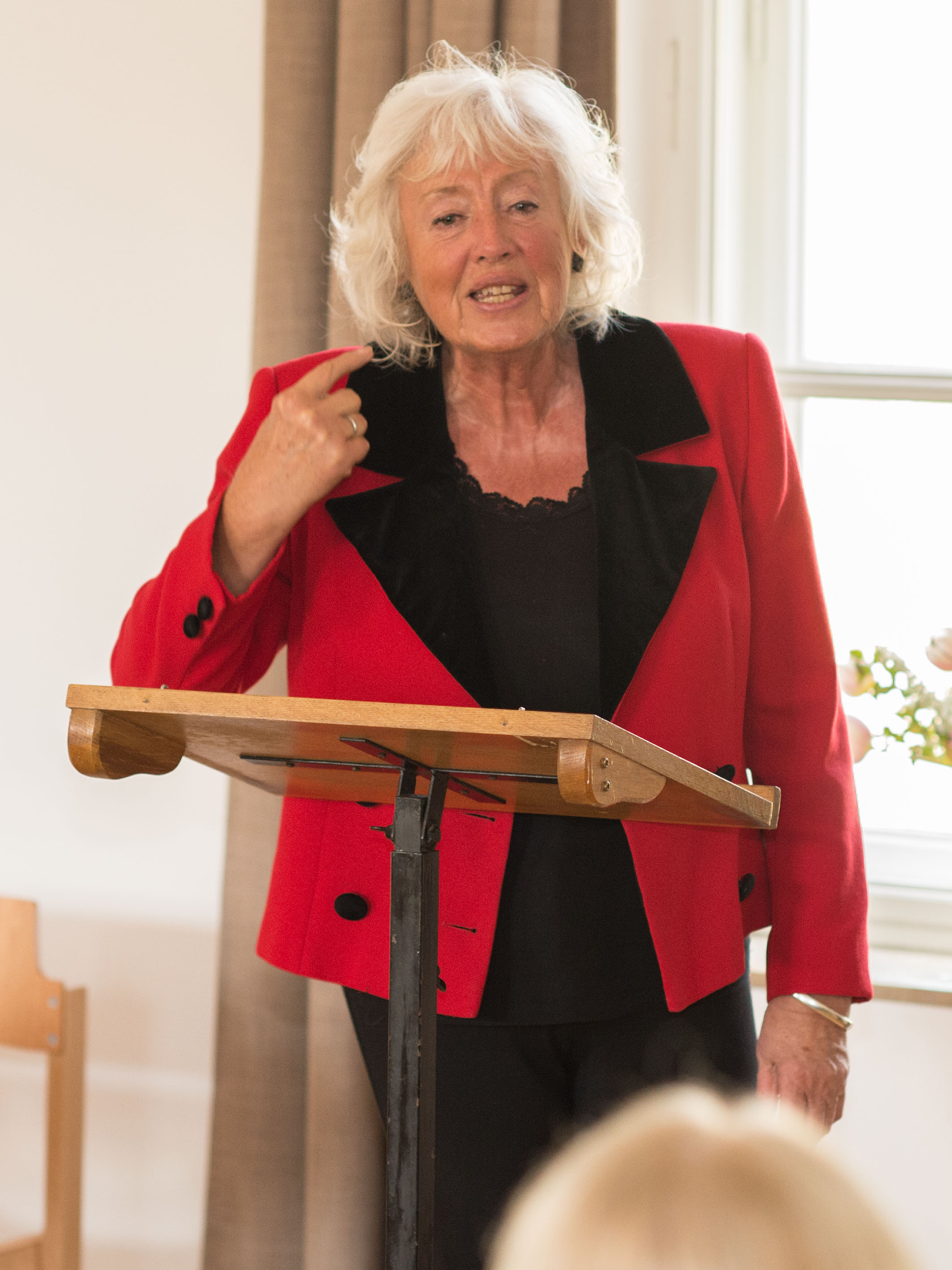
- Schmidt in 2014

Minister for Family, Senior Citizens, Women and Youth
- In office 22 October 2002 – 22 November 2005
- Chancellor: Gerhard Schröder
- Preceded by: Christine Bergmann
- Succeeded by: Ursula von der Leyen

Vice President of the Bundestag (on proposal of the SDP group)
- In office 20 December 1990 – 10 November 1994 Serving with Helmut Becker
- President: Rita Süssmuth
- Preceded by: Heinz Westphal
- Succeeded by: Hans-Ulrich Klose

Member of the Bundestag; from Bavaria
- In office 18 October 2005 – 27 October 2009
- Constituency: State list
- In office 4 November 1980 – 10 November 1994
- Preceded by: Hans Batz
- Succeeded by: Dagmar Wöhrl
- Constituency: Nuremberg North (1980–1983); State list (1983–1990); Nuremberg North (1990–1994)

Member of the Landtag of Bavaria; for Nuremberg North
- In office 20 October 1994 – 15 November 2002
- Preceded by: Günther Beckstein
- Succeeded by: Thomas Döbler

Personal details
- Born: Renate Pokorny; 12 December 1943 (age 82) Hanau, Germany
- Party: Social Democratic
- Spouse(s): Gerhardt Schmidt (m. 1961; died 1984) Hasso von Henninges (m. 1998)
- Children: 3

Renate Schmidt (née Pokorny; born 12 December 1943) is a German Social Democratic politician.

== Early life ==
Schmidt grew up in Coburg, Fürth, and Nuremberg. Due to a pregnancy at the age of 17, she was forced to leave school a year before she would have received her Abitur. Her future husband, Gerhard Schmidt (died 1984), with the assistance of both their families, supported her in raising the child while he attended university. In 1963 and 1970, she bore two more children. In 1974 her husband gave up his work as an architect, as her salary was bigger than his. Unusual for those times, he took charge of the household and cared for the children.

== Labor and political career ==
Having worked at Quelle AG, Schmidt was elected to the company's works council in 1972; she was not required to work from 1973 to 1980, because of this. From 1980 to 1988, she was the Bavarian state chairwoman of the labor union HBV (Gewerkschaft Handel, Banken und Versicherungen; meaning Labor Union Trade, Banks and Insurances).

Schmidt joined the SPD in 1972. In 1973, she and her husband founded a local chapter of the SPD youth organization. In 1980, she was elected to the Bundestag. From 1987 to 1990, she was deputy chairwoman of the SPD Fraktion in the Bundestag; from 1990 to 1994, she was Vice-President of the Bundestag.

From 1994 to 2002, Renate Schmidt was a member of the Landtag of Bavaria, representing the Wahlkreis (constituency) of Nürnberg-Nord. Here again, she was the leader of the SPD group until 2000.

In 1999, she announced she would retire from politics. However, she had to change her mind in 2002, for on 22 October of the same year she became Federal Minister for Family Affairs, Senior Citizens, Women and Youth. After the grand coalition took over power in 2005, Schmidt was discharged from her office and replaced by Ursula von der Leyen. However, she had been elected member of the Bundestag again. In 2009, she no longer stood for election and retired from official politics.

== Later life ==
Schmidt lives in Nuremberg, with her second husband Hasso von Henninges. She was bestowed honorary citizenship of her hometown in 2014.

== Recognition ==
- 2011 – Max Friedlaender Prize
- 1994 – Order for Combating Deadly Seriousness

== Books ==
- (in German) Renate Schmidt: "Was ich will" Im Gespräch mit Manfred E. Berger, ECON Verlag, 1994
- (in German) Renate Schmidt: Mut zur Menschlichkeit, ECON Verlag, 1995
- (in German) Renate Schmidt: SOS Familie. Ohne Kinder sehen wir alt aus, Rowohlt Verlag, 2002

Preceded by Christine Bergmann	Federal Minister for Family Affairs, Senior Citizens, Women and Youth of Germany; 2002-2005	Succeeded by Ursula von der Leyen
