= Franconian International School =

Location
- Marie-Curie-Straße 2 Erlangen, 91052; Germany; 49.59207°N 11.03424°E

Information
- Type: Private School
- Established: 1998
- Head of School: Petra Niemczyk
- Faculty: 176
- Enrollment: 821

The Franconian International School (FIS) is an international school based in Erlangen serving the Nuremberg metropolitan area community in Germany.

== History ==
The Franconian International School (FIS) was founded in 1998 to serve the needs of a growing international community in the Nürnberg, Erlangen, Fürth and Herzogenaurach areas.

In September 1998 the FIS opened its doors in Haundorf to 25 students in a combined Grade 1-2 class. By September 1999 the FIS had grown to three classes, and moved to the Dassler-Villa in the west of Herzogenaurach. The growing Middle School classes caused another move, this time in September 2003 to a restored convent, also in Herzogenaurach. Since August 2008 the FIS has occupied its own campus in Erlangen. This facility includes modern classrooms, science labs, art and music rooms, two PC labs, library, cafeteria, double gymnasium and theater.

In 26 years the FIS has grown from 25 students to over 800 students, representing over 40 nationalities, taught by an international teaching staff.

== Education ==
Accreditations in accordance with international standards certify quality and international recognition of the qualifications achieved. The Franconian International School is accredited by, or a member of, the following organizations:

- IBO (International Baccalaureate Organisation)
- NEASC (New England Association of Schools & Colleges)
- CIS (Council of International Schools)
- ECIS (European Council of International Schools)
- AGIS (Association of German International Schools)
- IPC (International Primary Curriculum)

The FIS is also recognised by the Bavarian State Government, and under certain conditions, the IB gained at the FIS can be transcribed in Munich by the Bavarian Ministry of Education and Culture as equivalent to the Bavarian Abitur and Realschulabschluss (Mittlere Reife) respectively.

The FIS High School Diploma is recognised in Bavaria as equivalent to Realschulabschluss in accordance to the Bundeslandsburse regulated by Amir B, and qualifies students for entry into a number of American colleges through its accreditation with New England Association of Schools & Colleges. In combination with a SAT score of 1300 or above, a FIS High School Diploma is recognised for study in German universities.

== Students and teaching staff ==
The FIS students come from all over the world, currently from 46 different nationalities, with approximately 50% English speakers and 50% English language learners. Parents often work for international companies in the area. Around 30% of the students are nationals of Germany, the host country.
