= Frankfurt am Main I =

Federal electoral district of Germany

181 Frankfurt am Main I
- Electoral district for the Bundestag
- Frankfurt am Main I in 2025
- State: Hesse
- Population: 380,100 (2019)
- Electorate: 201,216 (2021)
- Major settlements: Frankfurt am Main (partial)
- Area: 85.1 km^{2}

Current electoral district
- Created: 1949
- Member: Vacant
- Elected: 2025

Frankfurt am Main I is an electoral constituency (German: Wahlkreis) represented in the Bundestag. It elects one member via first-past-the-post voting. Under the current constituency numbering system, it is designated as constituency 181. It is located in southern Hesse, comprising the western part of the city of Frankfurt am Main.

Frankfurt am Main I was created for the inaugural 1949 federal election. From 2021 to 2025, it was represented by Armand Zorn of the Social Democratic Party (SPD).

== Geography ==
Frankfurt am Main I is located in southern Hesse. As of the 2021 federal election, it comprises the Ortsbezirke of Innenstadt I, Innenstadt II, West (excluding Schwanheim Ortsteil), Mitte-West, Nord-West, and Mitte-Nord from the independent city of Frankfurt am Main.

== History ==
Frankfurt am Main I was created in 1949, then known as Frankfurt/M I. From 1965 through 1972, it was named Frankfurt I. In the 1976 election, it was named Frankfurt (Main) I – Main-Taunus. From 1980 through 1998, it was named Frankfurt am Main I – Main-Taunus. It acquired its current name in the 2002 election. In the 1949 election, it was Hesse constituency 15 in the numbering system. From 1953 through 1976, it was number 140. From 1980 through 1998, it was number 138. In the 2002 and 2005 elections, it was number 183. In the 2009 through 2021 elections, it was number 182. From the 2025 election, it has been number 181.

Originally, the constituency comprised the Stadtbezirke of Oberrad, Sachsenhausen, Niederrad, Goldstein, Schwanheim, Griesheim, Nied, Höchst, Sindlingen, Zeilsheim, Unterliederbach, and Sossenheim from the city of Frankfurt am Main. In the 1976 through 1998 elections, it comprised the Stadtbezirke of Rödelheim, Hausen, Praunheim, Schwanheim, Goldstein-West, Griesheim, Nied, Höchst, Sindlingen, Zeilsheim, Unterliederbach, and Sossenheim from the city of Frankfurt am Main, as well as the municipalities of Bad Soden, Eschborn, Hattersheim, Kriftel, Liederbach, Schwalbach am Taunus, and Sulzbach (Taunus) from the Main-Taunus-Kreis district. It acquired its current borders in the 2002 election.

Election	No.	Name	Borders
1949	15	Frankfurt/M I	Frankfurt am Main city (only Oberrad, Sachsenhausen, Niederrad, Goldstein, Schwanheim, Griesheim, Nied, Höchst, Sindlingen, Zeilsheim, Unterliederbach, and Sossenheim Stadtbezirke)
1953	140	Frankfurt/M I	Frankfurt am Main city (only Oberrad, Sachsenhausen, Niederrad, Goldstein, Schwanheim, Griesheim, Nied, Höchst, Sindlingen, Zeilsheim, Unterliederbach, and Sossenheim Stadtbezirke)
1957	140	Frankfurt/M I	Frankfurt am Main city (only Oberrad, Sachsenhausen, Niederrad, Goldstein, Schwanheim, Griesheim, Nied, Höchst, Sindlingen, Zeilsheim, Unterliederbach, and Sossenheim Stadtbezirke)
1961	140	Frankfurt/M I	Frankfurt am Main city (only Oberrad, Sachsenhausen, Niederrad, Goldstein, Schwanheim, Griesheim, Nied, Höchst, Sindlingen, Zeilsheim, Unterliederbach, and Sossenheim Stadtbezirke)
1965	140	Frankfurt I	Frankfurt am Main city (only Oberrad, Sachsenhausen, Niederrad, Goldstein, Schwanheim, Griesheim, Nied, Höchst, Sindlingen, Zeilsheim, Unterliederbach, and Sossenheim Stadtbezirke)
1969	140	Frankfurt I	Frankfurt am Main city (only Oberrad, Sachsenhausen, Niederrad, Goldstein, Schwanheim, Griesheim, Nied, Höchst, Sindlingen, Zeilsheim, Unterliederbach, and Sossenheim Stadtbezirke)
1972	140	Frankfurt I	Frankfurt am Main city (only Oberrad, Sachsenhausen, Niederrad, Goldstein, Schwanheim, Griesheim, Nied, Höchst, Sindlingen, Zeilsheim, Unterliederbach, and Sossenheim Stadtbezirke)
1976	140	Frankfurt (Main) I – Main-Taunus	Frankfurt am Main city (only Rödelheim, Hausen, Praunheim, Schwanheim, Goldstein-West, Griesheim, Nied, Höchst, Sindlingen, Zeilsheim, Unterliederbach, and Sossenheim Stadtbezirke); Main-Taunus-Kreis district (only Bad Soden, Eschborn, Hattersheim, Kriftel, Liederbach, Schwalbach am Taunus, and Sulzbach (Taunus) municipalities)
1980	138	Frankfurt am Main I – Main-Taunus	Frankfurt am Main city (only Rödelheim, Hausen, Praunheim, Schwanheim, Goldstein-West, Griesheim, Nied, Höchst, Sindlingen, Zeilsheim, Unterliederbach, and Sossenheim Stadtbezirke); Main-Taunus-Kreis district (only Bad Soden, Eschborn, Hattersheim, Kriftel, Liederbach, Schwalbach am Taunus, and Sulzbach (Taunus) municipalities)
1983	138	Frankfurt am Main I – Main-Taunus	Frankfurt am Main city (only Rödelheim, Hausen, Praunheim, Schwanheim, Goldstein-West, Griesheim, Nied, Höchst, Sindlingen, Zeilsheim, Unterliederbach, and Sossenheim Stadtbezirke); Main-Taunus-Kreis district (only Bad Soden, Eschborn, Hattersheim, Kriftel, Liederbach, Schwalbach am Taunus, and Sulzbach (Taunus) municipalities)
1987	138	Frankfurt am Main I – Main-Taunus	Frankfurt am Main city (only Rödelheim, Hausen, Praunheim, Schwanheim, Goldstein-West, Griesheim, Nied, Höchst, Sindlingen, Zeilsheim, Unterliederbach, and Sossenheim Stadtbezirke); Main-Taunus-Kreis district (only Bad Soden, Eschborn, Hattersheim, Kriftel, Liederbach, Schwalbach am Taunus, and Sulzbach (Taunus) municipalities)
1990	138	Frankfurt am Main I – Main-Taunus	Frankfurt am Main city (only Rödelheim, Hausen, Praunheim, Schwanheim, Goldstein-West, Griesheim, Nied, Höchst, Sindlingen, Zeilsheim, Unterliederbach, and Sossenheim Stadtbezirke); Main-Taunus-Kreis district (only Bad Soden, Eschborn, Hattersheim, Kriftel, Liederbach, Schwalbach am Taunus, and Sulzbach (Taunus) municipalities)
1994	138	Frankfurt am Main I – Main-Taunus	Frankfurt am Main city (only Rödelheim, Hausen, Praunheim, Schwanheim, Goldstein-West, Griesheim, Nied, Höchst, Sindlingen, Zeilsheim, Unterliederbach, and Sossenheim Stadtbezirke); Main-Taunus-Kreis district (only Bad Soden, Eschborn, Hattersheim, Kriftel, Liederbach, Schwalbach am Taunus, and Sulzbach (Taunus) municipalities)
1998	138	Frankfurt am Main I – Main-Taunus	Frankfurt am Main city (only Rödelheim, Hausen, Praunheim, Schwanheim, Goldstein-West, Griesheim, Nied, Höchst, Sindlingen, Zeilsheim, Unterliederbach, and Sossenheim Stadtbezirke); Main-Taunus-Kreis district (only Bad Soden, Eschborn, Hattersheim, Kriftel, Liederbach, Schwalbach am Taunus, and Sulzbach (Taunus) municipalities)
2002	183	Frankfurt am Main I	Frankfurt am Main city (only Innenstadt I, Innenstadt II, West (excluding Schwanheim Ortsteil), Mitte-West, Nord-West, and Mitte-Nord Ortsbezirke)
2005	183	Frankfurt am Main I	Frankfurt am Main city (only Innenstadt I, Innenstadt II, West (excluding Schwanheim Ortsteil), Mitte-West, Nord-West, and Mitte-Nord Ortsbezirke)
2009	182	Frankfurt am Main I	Frankfurt am Main city (only Innenstadt I, Innenstadt II, West (excluding Schwanheim Ortsteil), Mitte-West, Nord-West, and Mitte-Nord Ortsbezirke)
2013	182	Frankfurt am Main I	Frankfurt am Main city (only Innenstadt I, Innenstadt II, West (excluding Schwanheim Ortsteil), Mitte-West, Nord-West, and Mitte-Nord Ortsbezirke)
2017	182	Frankfurt am Main I	Frankfurt am Main city (only Innenstadt I, Innenstadt II, West (excluding Schwanheim Ortsteil), Mitte-West, Nord-West, and Mitte-Nord Ortsbezirke)
2021	182	Frankfurt am Main I	Frankfurt am Main city (only Innenstadt I, Innenstadt II, West (excluding Schwanheim Ortsteil), Mitte-West, Nord-West, and Mitte-Nord Ortsbezirke)
2025	181	Frankfurt am Main I	Frankfurt am Main city (only Innenstadt I, Innenstadt II, West (excluding Schwanheim Ortsteil), Mitte-West, Nord-West, and Mitte-Nord Ortsbezirke)

== Members ==
The constituency was first represented by Hermann Brill of the Social Democratic Party (SPD) from 1949 to 1953, followed by Peter Horn of the Christian Democratic Union (CDU) from 1953 to 1961. Georg Leber regained it for the SPD in 1965 and served until 1976, when he was succeeded by Karsten Voigt. Heinz Riesenhuber of the CDU won the constituency in 1983 and was representative until 2002. Gudrun Schaich-Walch was elected for the SPD in 2002 and served a single term, followed by fellow SPD member Gregor Amann in 2005. Matthias Zimmer was elected in 2009, and re-elected in 2013 and 2017. Armand Zorn won the constituency for the SPD in 2021.

Election	Member	Party	%
1949	Hermann Brill	SPD	38.7
1953	Peter Horn	CDU	37.7
1957	Peter Horn	CDU	42.5
1961	Georg Leber	SPD	45.4
1965	Georg Leber	SPD	48.3
1969	Georg Leber	SPD	55.3
1972	Georg Leber	SPD	54.8
1976	Karsten Voigt	SPD	44.3
1980	Karsten Voigt	SPD	46.6
1983	Heinz Riesenhuber	CDU	48.8
1987	Heinz Riesenhuber	CDU	48.5
1990	Heinz Riesenhuber	CDU	48.6
1994	Heinz Riesenhuber	CDU	50.1
1998	Heinz Riesenhuber	CDU	44.0
2002	Gudrun Schaich-Walch	SPD	44.3
2005	Gregor Amann	SPD	39.8
2009	Matthias Zimmer	CDU	35.2
2013	Matthias Zimmer	CDU	40.2
2017	Matthias Zimmer	CDU	30.6
2021	Armand Zorn	SPD	29.0
2025	Vacant (Note: Yannick Schwander (CDU) won with 26.0% but seat remained vacant due to insufficient second votes cover.)		

== Election results ==
=== 2025 election ===
Federal election (2025): Frankfurt am Main I
Notes:	Blue background denotes the winner of the electorate vote. Pink background denotes a candidate elected from their party list. Yellow background denotes an electorate win by a list member, or other incumbent. A ✓ or ✗ denotes status of any incumbent, win or lose respectively.						
Party	Candidate	Votes	%	±%	Party votes	%	±%
CDU	Yannick Schwander	41,232	26.0	▲4.3	37,384	23.5	▲5.5
Greens	Deborah Düring	25,758	16.2	▼2.5	28,697	18.0	▼5.5
SPD	✗ Armand Zorn	40,832	25.7	▼3.3	27,190	17.1	▼5.5
Left	Janine Wissler	20,329	12.8	▲4.1	24,476	15.4	▲8.2
AfD	Jörn Bauer	17,067	10.8	▲5.2	17,092	10.7	▲5.3
FDP	Frank Maiwald	7,418	4.7	▼6.7	10,541	6.6	▼8.2
BSW					8,274	5.2	New
Volt	Mariana Haramus	2,517	1.6	▼0.3	1,892	1.2	0.0
Tierschutzpartei					1,370	0.9	▼0.3
FW	Marcel Stilger	1,465	0.9	▼0.5	856	0.5	▼0.3
PARTEI	Macimilian Klöckner	1,693	1.1	New	801	0.5	▼0.5
BD					190	0.1	New
Humanists					156	0.1	0.0
MLPD	Nuran Çakmaklı-Kraft	323	0.2	▲0.1	103	0.1	0.0
Informal votes		1,547			1,159		
Total valid votes		158,634			159,022		
Turnout		160,181	78.7	▲6.7			
CDU gain from SPD	Majority	400	0.3	N/A			

=== 2021 election ===
Federal election (2021): Frankfurt am Main I
Notes:	Blue background denotes the winner of the electorate vote. Pink background denotes a candidate elected from their party list. Yellow background denotes an electorate win by a list member, or other incumbent. A ✓ or ✗ denotes status of any incumbent, win or lose respectively.						
Party	Candidate	Votes	%	±%	Party votes	%	±%
SPD	Armand Zorn	41,604	29.0	▲1.9	32,499	22.6	▲1.8
CDU	Axel Kaufmann	31,163	21.7	▼8.8	25,915	18.0	▼8.0
Greens	Deborah Düring	26,922	18.8	▲7.9	33,821	23.5	▲9.9
FDP	Frank Maiwald	16,369	11.4	▲2.2	21,361	14.9	▲0.9
Left	Janine Wissler	12,562	8.8	▼1.0	10,384	7.2	▼4.8
AfD	Patrick Schenk	7,909	5.5	▼3.5	7,846	5.5	▼3.9
Team Todenhöfer					2,496	1.7	
Volt	Maximilian Zänker	2,685	1.9		1,734	1.2	
Tierschutzpartei					1,716	1.2	▲0.2
FW	Eric Pärisch	2,094	1.5	▲0.5	1,184	0.8	▲0.3
dieBasis	Martin Heipertz	2,052	1.4		1,597	1.1	
PARTEI					1,389	1.0	▼0.3
Pirates					645	0.4	0.0
Humanists					210	0.1	
Gesundheitsforschung					179	0.1	
V-Partei3					168	0.1	▼0.1
Bündnis C					133	0.1	
NPD					125	0.1	▼0.1
ÖDP					118	0.1	▼0.1
DKP					97	0.1	0.0
MLPD	Karsten Wappelt	143	0.1	0.0	72	0.1	0.0
LKR					39	0.0	
Bündnis 21					35	0.0	
Informal votes		1,507			1,247		
Total valid votes		143,503			143,763		
Turnout		145,010	72.1	▼0.4			
SPD gain from CDU	Majority	10,441	7.3				

=== 2017 election ===
Federal election (2017): Frankfurt am Main I
Notes:	Blue background denotes the winner of the electorate vote. Pink background denotes a candidate elected from their party list. Yellow background denotes an electorate win by a list member, or other incumbent. A ✓ or ✗ denotes status of any incumbent, win or lose respectively.						
Party	Candidate	Votes	%	±%	Party votes	%	±%
CDU	✓ Matthias Zimmer	43,663	30.5	▼9.6	37,221	26.0	▼7.5
SPD	Oliver Strank	38,704	27.1	▼6.0	29,743	20.8	▼6.1
Greens	Jessica Purkhardt	15,596	10.9	▲1.0	19,475	13.6	▲0.3
Left	Achim Kessler	13,934	9.7	▲1.9	17,179	12.0	▲3.1
FDP	Nicola Beer	13,185	9.2	▲6.1	19,989	14.0	▲6.9
AfD	Horst Reschke	12,892	9.0		13,342	9.3	▲4.0
PARTEI	Nico Wehnemann	2,493	1.7	▲1.0	1,755	1.2	▲0.6
Tierschutzpartei					1,399	1.0	
FW	Michael Weingärtner	1,307	0.9	▼0.3	725	0.5	▼0.2
Pirates	Pawel Borodan	969	0.7	▼1.7	692	0.5	▼1.9
BGE					331	0.2	
DM					325	0.2	
NPD					315	0.2	▼0.5
ÖDP					266	0.2	
V-Partei³					252	0.2	
MLPD	Corinna Koske-Jones	209	0.1		134	0.1	▲0.1
SGP	Marianne Arens	97	0.1				
DKP					53	0.0	
BüSo					31	0.0	0.0
Informal votes		1,792			1,614		
Total valid votes		143,049			143,227		
Turnout		144,841	72.5	▲4.1			
CDU hold	Majority	4,959	3.4	▼3.8			

=== 2013 election ===
Federal election (2013): Frankfurt am Main I
Notes:	Blue background denotes the winner of the electorate vote. Pink background denotes a candidate elected from their party list. Yellow background denotes an electorate win by a list member, or other incumbent. A ✓ or ✗ denotes status of any incumbent, win or lose respectively.						
Party	Candidate	Votes	%	±%	Party votes	%	±%
CDU	✓ Matthias Zimmer	52,427	40.2	▲4.9	43,883	33.5	▲5.9
SPD	Gregor Amann	43,124	33.0	▲3.0	35,106	26.8	▲4.5
Greens	Angela Anne Hanisch	12,875	9.9	▼2.2	17,398	13.3	▼2.5
Left	Margarete Wiemer	10,280	7.9	▼1.4	11,684	8.9	▼2.2
FDP	Hans-Joachim Otto	4,125	3.2	▼6.7	9,209	7.0	▼10.4
AfD					6,983	5.3	
Pirates	Thorsten Wirth	3,066	2.3		3,117	2.4	▼0.2
FW	Rainer Drephal	1,586	1.2		904	0.7	
NPD	Martin Patrick Baumgart	1,148	0.9	▼0.1	949	0.7	▼0.2
PARTEI	Nico Wehnemann	939	0.7		869	0.7	
REP	Frank-Michael Homa	772	0.6	▼0.1	450	0.3	▼0.3
PRO					133	0.1	
BüSo	Ilja Bertold Karpowski	177	0.1	▼0.1	85	0.1	▼0.1
SGP					62	0.0	
MLPD					56	0.0	0.0
Informal votes		3,056			2,687		
Total valid votes		130,519			130,888		
Turnout		133,575	68.3	▼1.4			
CDU hold	Majority	9,303	7.2	▲2.1			

=== 2009 election ===
Federal election (2009): Frankfurt am Main I
Notes:	Blue background denotes the winner of the electorate vote. Pink background denotes a candidate elected from their party list. Yellow background denotes an electorate win by a list member, or other incumbent. A ✓ or ✗ denotes status of any incumbent, win or lose respectively.						
Party	Candidate	Votes	%	±%	Party votes	%	±%
CDU	Matthias Zimmer	45,866	35.2	▼2.1	36,031	27.6	▼1.9
SPD	✗ Gregor Amann	39,147	30.1	▼9.7	29,107	22.3	▼8.7
Greens	Martina Feldmayer	15,701	12.1	▲2.5	20,645	15.8	▲0.3
FDP	Hans-Joachim Otto	12,876	9.9	▲4.2	22,761	17.5	▲4.6
Left	Margarete Wiemer	12,031	9.2	▲3.4	14,551	11.2	▲4.1
Pirates					3,355	2.6	
Tierschutzpartei	Julia Reichel	1,879	1.4		1,415	1.1	▲0.1
NPD	Günter Ulrich	1,327	1.0	▼0.8	1,266	1.0	▼0.3
REP	Matthias Ottmar	862	0.7		824	0.6	▼0.2
BüSo	Rainer Apel	353	0.3		210	0.2	▲0.1
MLPD	Veit-Harald Müller	170	0.1		92	0.1	0.0
DVU					81	0.1	
Informal votes		2,217			2,091		
Total valid votes		130,212			130,338		
Turnout		132,429	69.7	▼4.5			
CDU gain from SPD	Majority	6,719	5.1				

=== 2005 election ===
Federal election (2005):Frankfurt am Main I
Notes:	Blue background denotes the winner of the electorate vote. Pink background denotes a candidate elected from their party list. Yellow background denotes an electorate win by a list member, or other incumbent. A ✓ or ✗ denotes status of any incumbent, win or lose respectively.						
Party	Candidate	Votes	%	±%	Party votes	%	±%
SPD	Gregor Amann	52,850	39.8	▼4.5	41,413	31.1	▼3.8
CDU	Markus Frank	49,510	37.3	▲1.4	39,377	29.5	▼4.0
Greens	Ulrike Gauderer	12,650	9.5	▲0.5	20,739	15.6	▼2.0
Left	Hans-Joachim Viehl	7,783	5.9	▲4.0	9,357	7.0	▲4.5
FDP	Hans-Joachim Otto	7,783	5.9	▲4.0	9,357	7.0	▲4.5
NPD	Werner Bargon	2,408	1.8	▲1.2	1,636	1.2	▲0.8
Tierschutzpartei					1,328	1.0	▲0.3
REP					1,044	0.8	▲0.1
GRAUEN					938	0.7	▲0.5
BüSo					121	0.1	0.0
MLPD					108	0.1	0.0
SGP					95	0.1	
Informal votes		3,059			2,502		
Total valid votes		132,804			133,361		
Turnout		135,863	74.2	▼1.6			
SPD hold	Majority	3,340	2.5				
