= Wolfgang Stefinger =

German politician (born 1985)

Wolfgang Stefinger MdB
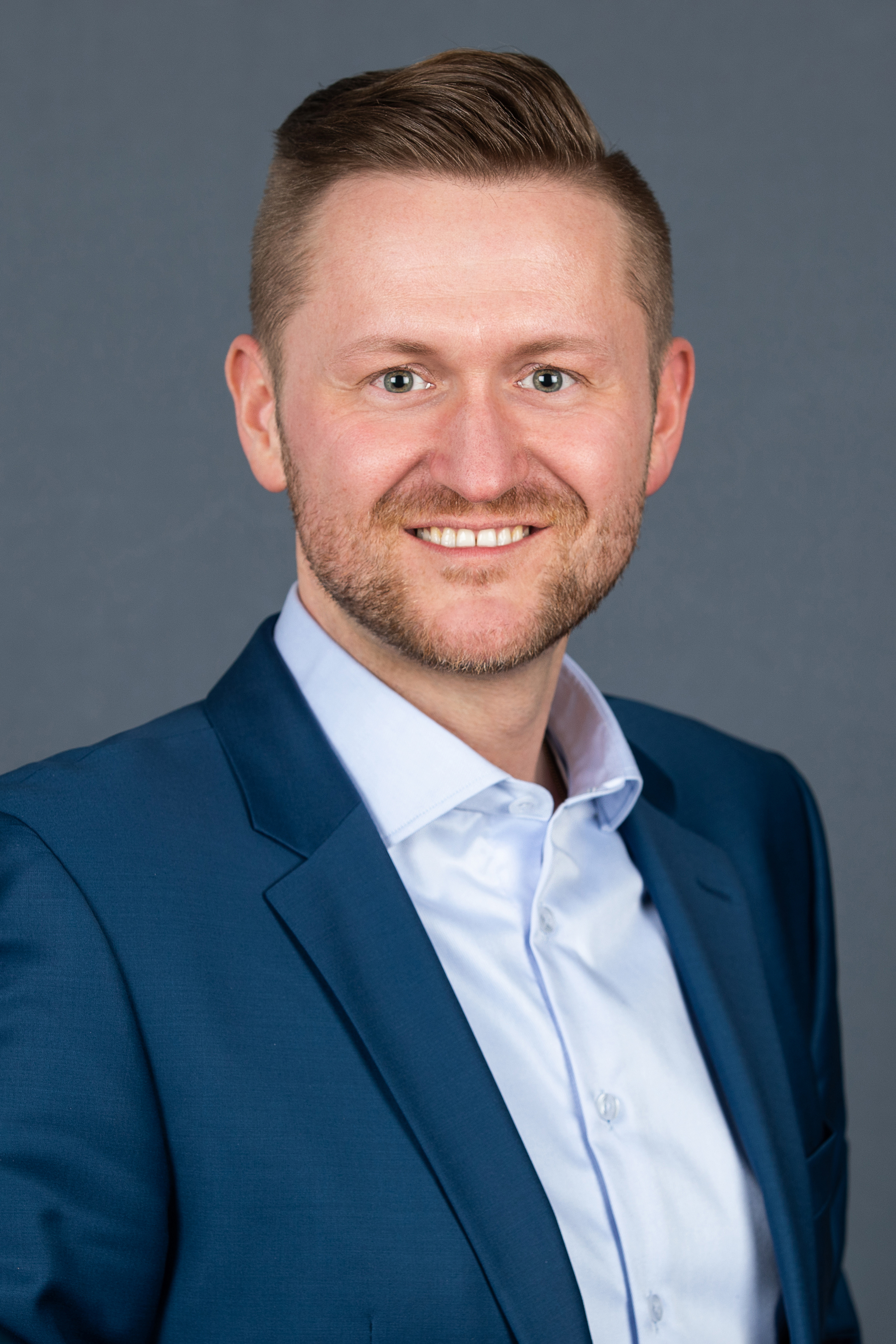
- Stefinger in 2020

Member of the Bundestag; for Munich East
- Incumbent
- Assumed office 22 October 2013
- Preceded by: Herbert Frankenhauser

Personal details
- Born: 20 April 1985 (age 41) Munich, West Germany
- Party: Christian Social Union
- Spouse: Sepp Müller (m. 2026)
- Education: Munich University of Applied Sciences

Wolfgang Stefinger (born 20 April 1985) is a German politician of the Christian Social Union (CSU) who has been serving as a member of the Bundestag from the state of Bavaria since 2013.

== Political career ==
Stefinger first became a member of the Bundestag in the 2013 German federal election. He is a member of the Committee on Education, Research and Technology Assessment and the Committee on Economic Cooperation and Development. In this capacity, he is his parliamentary group's rapporteur for relations with India.

In addition to his committee assignments, Stefinger serves as deputy chairman of the German Parliamentary Friendship Group for Relations with the Southern African States.

In the negotiations to form a fourth coalition government under Chancellor Angela Merkel following the 2017 federal elections, Stefinger was part of the working group on education policy, led by Annegret Kramp-Karrenbauer, Stefan Müller and Hubertus Heil. In the negotiations to form a Grand Coalition under the leadership of Friedrich Merz's Christian Democrats (CDU together with the Bavarian CSU) and the Social Democratic Party (SPD) following the 2025 German elections, he was part of the CDU/CSU delegation in the working group on foreign affairs, defense, development cooperation and human rights, led by Johann Wadephul, Florian Hahn and Svenja Schulze.

== Other activities ==
=== Corporate boards ===
- GIZ, Member of the Board of Trustees (since 2025)

=== Non-profit organizations ===
- German-African Business Association, Member of the Advisory Board (since 2025)
- German Africa Foundation, Member of the Board (since 2022)
- German-Mozambican Society, Member of the Advisory Board
- Baker Tilly Foundation, Member of the Advisory Board
- Federal Agency for Civic Education (BPB), Member of the Board of Trustees
- St Barbara Foundation, Member of the Board of Trustees

== Political positions ==
In June 2017, Stefinger voted against his parliamentary group’s majority and in favor of Germany’s introduction of same-sex marriage.

=== Controversy ===
Amid the COVID-19 pandemic in Germany in 2020, Stefinger was one of three members of his parliamentary group – alongside Ronja Kemmer and Christoph Ploß – who became the subject of media scrutiny after they had accepted an invitation to embark on a three-day short trip to Oman; Oman's embassy covered their travel expenses of 5,466 euros each.

== Personal life ==
Stefinger has been in a relationship with fellow politician Sepp Müller since 2022. In July 2026 Stefinger married in Bavaria his husband Müller. They got a blessing ceremony in Archdiocese of Munich and Freising of Roman-Catholic church in Wildbad Kreuth.
