= Hermann Brill =

German politician (1895–1959)

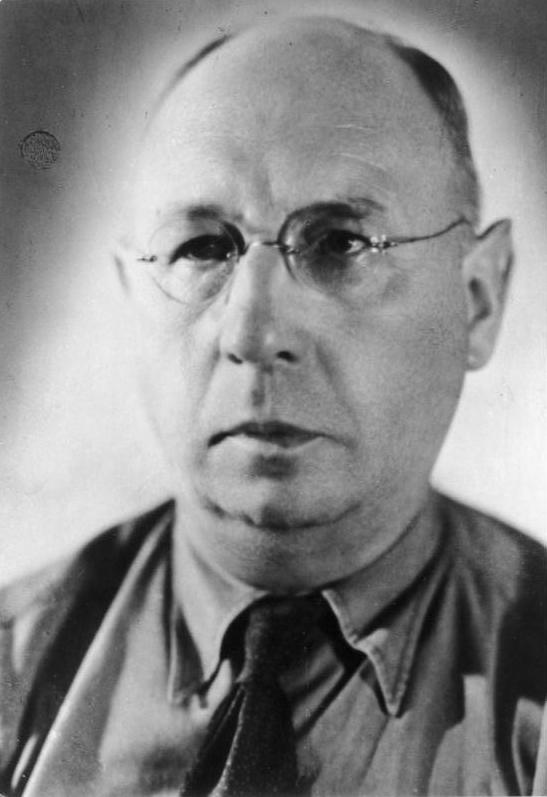
- Brill in 1930

Minister-President of Thuringia
- In office 7 May 1945 – 16 July 1945
- Preceded by: Willy Marschler
- Succeeded by: Rudolf Paul

Member of the Bundestag; for Frankfurt/M I
- In office 7 September 1949 – 6 October 1953
- Preceded by: Constituency established
- Succeeded by: Peter Horn

Member of the Reichstag; for Thuringia
- In office 30 August 1932 – 6 December 1932

Member of the Landtag of Thuringia
- In office 1 May 1933 – 20 June 1933
- Preceded by: Multi-member district
- Succeeded by: Constituency abolished
- Constituency: State list
- In office July 1920 – August 1932
- Preceded by: Constituency established
- Succeeded by: Multi-member district
- Constituency: Saxe-Gotha (1920–1921); State list (1921–1924); Wahlkreis 1 (1924–1927); Wahlkreis 4 (1927–1932)

Member of the Landtag of Saxe-Gotha
- In office 1919–1920

Personal details
- Born: Hermann Louis Brill; 9 February 1895 Graefenroda, Germany
- Died: 22 June 1959 (aged 64) Wiesbaden, West Germany
- Party: Social Democratic (1922–1933; after 1945)
- Other political affiliations: USPD (1918–1922)

Dr. Hermann Louis Brill (9 February 1895 – 22 June 1959) was a German resistance fighter, doctor of law and politician (SPD).

== Biography ==
Brill was born in the small town of Gräfenroda, Saxe-Coburg and Gotha, on 9 February 1895 as the son of a tailor; after finishing school, he attended the Herzog-Ernst-Seminar in Gotha to become a teacher. His political career began in 1918, when he entered the Independent Social Democratic Party of Germany; less than two years later, he became a member of the Thuringian parliament (Landtag) for the first time, where he stayed until 1933.

However, Brill only stayed a member of the USPD for four years; in 1922, he left the party again and found his new political home in the Social Democratic Party of Germany (SPD) instead. In 1932, Brill was also a member of the federal German parliament (Reichstag).

The Nazis met with resistance from Brill since he first came in contact with them after they became part of the reigning coalition in Thuringia in 1930; Brill was especially opposed to the politics of Nazi minister of the interior Wilhelm Frick, and led a committee of investigation established by the Landtag in 1932 that scrutinised Frick's practices. It was also during this time that he met Adolf Hitler, who appeared as a witness in front of the committee, an experience that led to Brill making the decision to resist Hitler "at any time, anywhere and under every circumstance" ("jederzeit, überall, unter allen Umständen").

Following Hitler's rise to power, Brill left the SPD in May 1933, scandalised by the party executive's passive attitude towards Hitler; one year later, he founded the Deutsche Volksfront, a resistance group, in Berlin together with Otto Brass. Brill also wrote a number of essays and leaflets during this time; he was arrested several times by the Gestapo, and after the workings of the Deutsche Volksfront were discovered, was convicted of high treason in 1938 and sentenced to 12 years in prison.

After first being jailed in the Zuchthaus Brandenburg-Görden, he was taken to the Buchenwald concentration camp in 1943; following the liberation of Buchenwald on 11 April 1945, he wrote the Buchenwald Manifesto (Buchenwalder Manifest der demokratischen Sozialisten).

The same month, Brill also began creating a plan for the administrative rebuilding of Thuringia for the American administration. In June 1945 he was appointed Regierungspräsident (president of the government) of Thuringia, an office he lost in July after Thuringia became part of the Soviet occupation zone, due to pressure from Walter Ulbricht. In May 1945 he founded the Bund Demokratischer Sozialisten (Federation of Democratic Socialists) in Thuringia, which finally evolved into Thuringia's SPD branch, with Brill as its first chairman, but after being arrested and interrogated twice by the Soviet administration, he left Thuringia at the end of 1945 and began working for the American administration in Berlin.

In 1948 Brill helped draft a constitution (Grundgesetz) for the new German republic, and from 1949 to 1953, he was a member of the first Bundestag, the parliament of the newly founded Germany, where he represented Frankfurt am Main I. In his last year as a member of parliament, he put through the first Bundesentschädigungsgesetz (compensation law) for those who had been subjected to prosecution based on political views, race or religion.

In later years, Brill taught at the universities of Frankfurt and Speyer. He was responsible for the introduction of political science as a field of study in Germany and wrote several articles pertaining to issues such as German reunification.

Hermann Brill died on 22 June 1959 in Wiesbaden.

== See also ==
- List of Germans who resisted Nazism
