= Armand Zorn =

German politician (born 1988)

Armand Zorn MdB
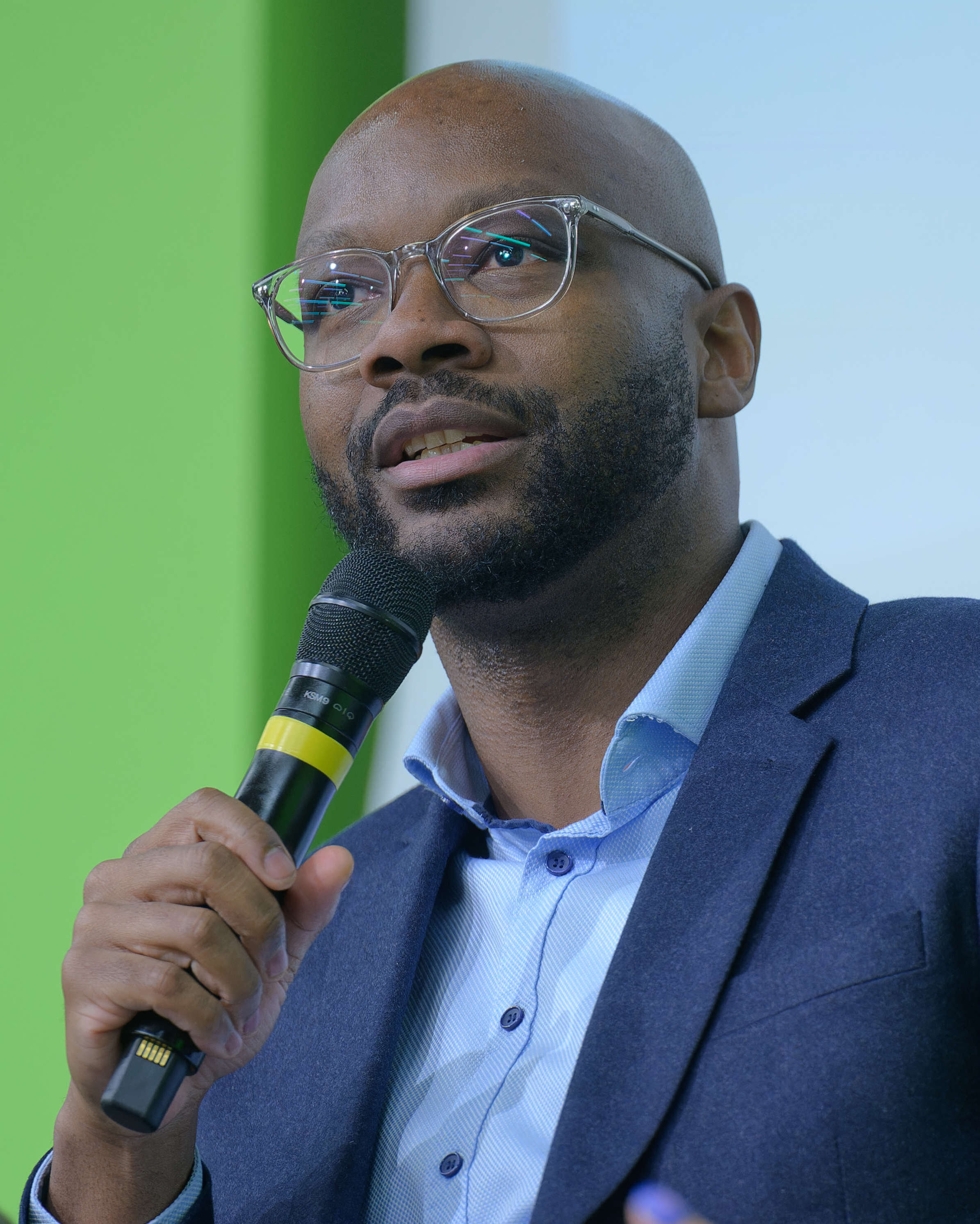
- Zorn in 2024

Member of the Bundestag; from Hesse
- Incumbent
- Assumed office 26 October 2021
- Preceded by: Matthias Zimmer
- Constituency: Frankfurt am Main I (2021–2025); State list (2025–present)

Personal details
- Born: 18 July 1988 (age 38) Yaoundé, Cameroon
- Party: Social Democratic
- Education: MLU Halle-Wittenberg; Sciences Po; University of Konstanz; Johns Hopkins University
- Occupation: Consultant

Armand Zorn (born 18 July 1988) is a German politician of the Social Democratic Party (SPD) who has been serving as a member of the Bundestag since 2021, representing the Frankfurt am Main I district from 2021 to 2025, and being elected via the Hesse state list since 2025.

== Early life and education ==
Zorn was born 1988 in Yaoundé in Cameroon and moved to Germany in 2000. His family settled in Halle in Saxony-Anhalt where he was educated. He graduated from Martin Luther University of Halle-Wittenberg in 2012 with a degree in Political and Historical Science, followed by two years at the Sciences Po in Paris with a diploma in European affairs. He then received a Masters degree at the University of Konstanz and a Master of Laws at Martin Luther University.

Zorn worked at the representative offices of the German Ministry of Finance in Hong Kong and Macao and at the French National Assembly. Afterwards he worked as a consultant for PricewaterhouseCoopers.

== Political career ==
In 2011, Zorn joined the SPD and in 2019, became a member of the governing board for the Frankfurt Social Democrats.

In 2021, Zorn ran in the 2021 German federal election for the SPD. While he was on the party's list at number 23, which did not offer a strong chance to enter the Bundestag, he won the direct mandate in his district with 29% of the vote. In parliament, he has been serving on the Finance Committee, the Committee on Digital Affairs and the Parliamentary Advisory Council on Sustainable Development.

In addition to his committee assignments, Zorn has been a member of the German delegation to the Franco-German Parliamentary Assembly since 2022.

In the negotiations to form a Grand Coalition under the leadership of Friedrich Merz's Christian Democrats (CDU together with the Bavarian CSU) and the SPD following the 2025 German elections, Zorn led the SPD delegation in the working group on digital policy; his counterparts from the other parties were Manuel Hagel and Reinhard Brandl.

Since 2025, Zorn has been serving as deputy chair of his parliamentary group, under the leadership of chairman Matthias Miersch. In this capacity, he oversees the group’s legislative activities on economic affairs, energy, tourism, digitization and transport.

== Other activities ==
=== Corporate boards ===
- GIZ, Member of the Board of Trustees (since 2025)

=== Non-profit organizations ===
- German-African Business Association, Member of the Advisory Board (since 2025)
- Business Forum of the Social Democratic Party of Germany, Member of the Political Advisory Board (since 2022)
