= Matthias Zimmer =

German politician (1961–2023)

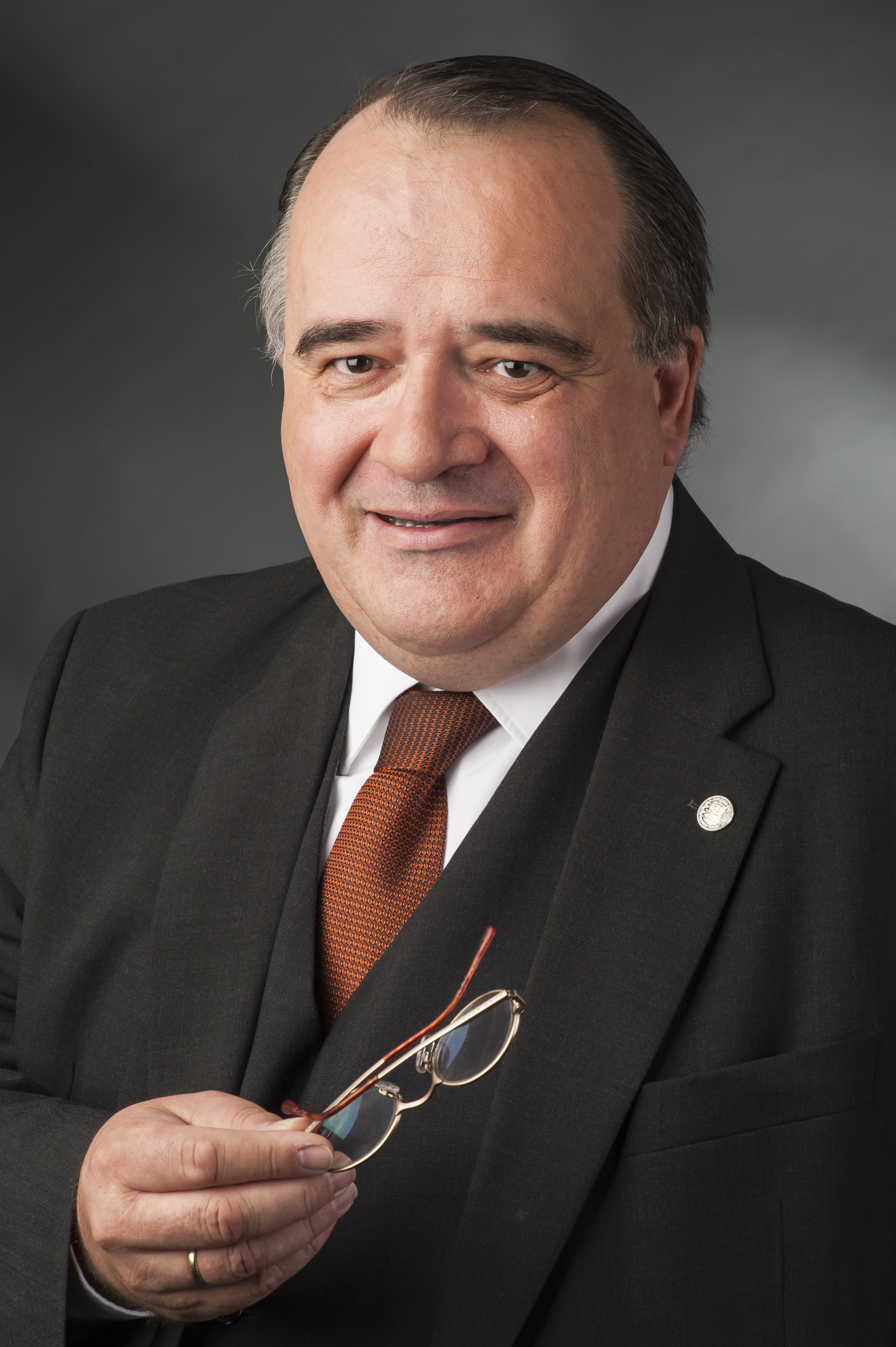
- Zimmer in 2014

Member of the Bundestag; for Frankfurt am Main I
- In office 27 October 2009 – 26 October 2021
- Preceded by: Gregor Amann
- Succeeded by: Armand Zorn

Personal details
- Born: Matthias Rainer Zimmer; 3 May 1961 Marburg, West Germany
- Died: 19 July 2023 (aged 62)
- Party: Christian Democratic Union
- Children: 2
- Education: University of Trier; Indiana University of Pennsylvania; LMU Munich

Matthias Zimmer (3 May 1961 – 19 July 2023) was a German author and politician of the Christian Democratic Union (CDU) who served as a member of the Bundestag from the state of Hesse from 2009, winning a constituency in Frankfurt am Main for three terms until 2021.

== Political career ==
Zimmer became a member of the Bundestag in the 2009 German federal election. In parliament, he was a member of the Committee on Labour and Social Affairs and the Committee on Human Rights and Humanitarian Aid, the latter of which he chaired from 2017 until 2018.

In addition to his committee assignments, Zimmer co-chaired the German-Canadian Parliamentary Friendship Group.

In an internal vote on the CDU candidate for the 2021 elections, Zimmer lost against Axel Kaufmann.

== Political positions ==
In June 2017, Zimmer voted against his parliamentary group's majority and in favor of Germany's introduction of same-sex marriage.

In 2019, Zimmer joined 14 members of his parliamentary group who, in an open letter, called for the party to rally around Angela Merkel and party chairwoman Annegret Kramp-Karrenbauer amid criticism voiced by conservatives Friedrich Merz and Roland Koch.

== Death ==
Matthias Zimmer died on 19 July 2023, at the age of 62.

== Selected publications ==
- Nationales Interesse und Staatsräson. Zur Deutschlandpolitik der Regierung Kohl 1982–1989. Paderborn 1992
- with Udo Margedant: Eigentum und Freiheit. Eigentumstheorien im 17. und 18. Jahrhundert. Idstein 1993
- Ed.: Germany – Phoenix in Trouble? Edmonton 1997
- Ed. with Angelika Sauer: A Chorus of Different Voices. German-Canadian Identities. New York 1998
- Moderne, Staat und Internationale Politik. Wiesbaden 2008
- with Thomas Scheben: Der Hund am Fallschirm. Streifzüge durch die Frankfurter Geschichte. Frankfurt am Main 2009
- Ed. with Michael Thielen: Die Zukunft der Arbeit. Christlich-Soziale Perspektiven. Berlin 2013
- Nachhaltigkeit! Für eine Politik aus christlicher Grundüberzeugung. Freiburg 2015
- Am Rande der Politik. Frankfurt am Main 2016
- Person und Ordnung. Einführung in die Soziale Marktwirtschaft. Freiburg 2020.
- Alte Werte in neuer Zeit. Christliche Verantwortung und praktische Politik. Frankfurt am Main 2021
- Morandus. Frankfurt am Main 2021
- Abenteuer Bundestag. Norderstedt 2022
- Der tote Bundestagsabgeordnete. Frankfurt am Main 2022
- Calixt. Frankfurt am Main 2023
