= Gregor Amann =

German politician (born 1962)

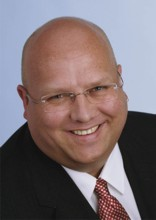
- Amann in 2007

Member of the Bundestag; for Frankfurt am Main I
- In office 18 October 2005 – 27 October 2009
- Preceded by: Gudrun Schaich-Walch
- Succeeded by: Matthias Zimmer

Personal details
- Born: 15 August 1962 (age 64) Ravensburg, West Germany
- Party: Social Democratic
- Education: Goethe University Frankfurt

Gregor Amann (born 15 August 1962) is a German politician and member of the SPD.

Amann was from 2005 to 2009 a member of the 16th Bundestag, where he represented Frankfurt am Main I.
