= Hans Schlange-Schöningen =

German politician (1886–1960)

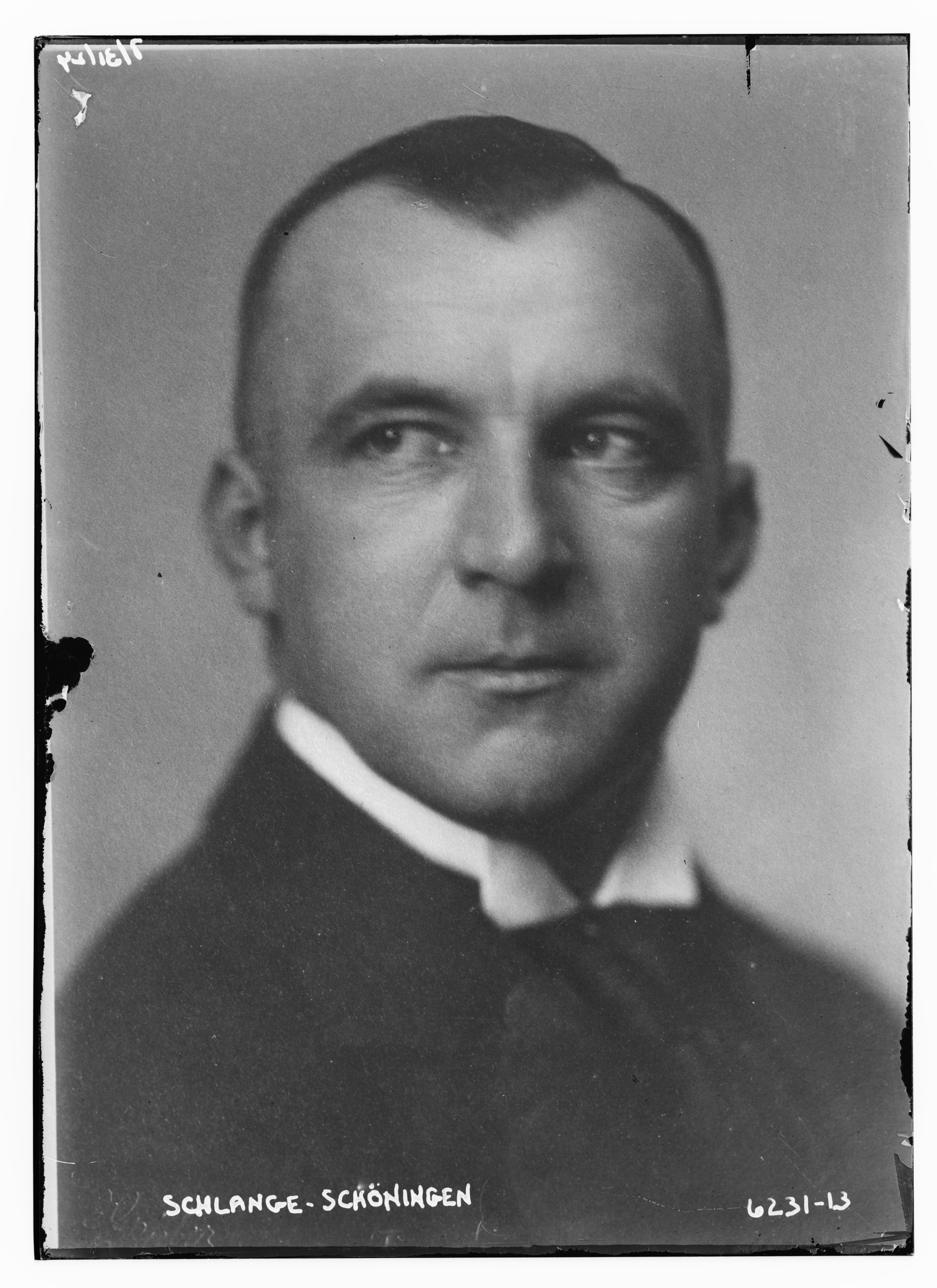

Minister without portfolio
- In office 1 October 1930 – 1 June 1932
- Chancellor: Heinrich Brüning
- Preceded by: Gottfried Reinhold Treviranus
- Succeeded by: Franz Bracht; Johannes Popitz

Member of the Bundestag; from Hesse
- In office 7 September 1949 – 9 June 1950
- Preceded by: Constituency established
- Succeeded by: Peter Horn
- Constituency: State list

Member of the Reichstag
- In office 27 May 1924 – 30 August 1932
- Constituency: Pomerania (1924–1930); Party list (1930–1932)

Member of the Landtag of Prussia
- In office 1921–1928

Personal details
- Born: Hans Schlange; 17 November 1886 Schöningen, Pomerania, Germany
- Died: 20 July 1960 (aged 73) Bad Godesberg, West Germany
- Party: Christian Democratic Union (1945–1960)
- Other political affiliations: DNVP (1920–1930); CNBLP (1930–1932)
- Spouse: Margarete von Nagy (m. 1913)
- Children: 3
- Relatives: Ernst Schlange (cousin); Apponyi family (by marriage)

Hans Schlange-Schöningen (17 November 1886 – 20 July 1960) was a German politician of the Christian Democratic Union (CDU) and a member of the German Bundestag.

== Early life ==
Born to a Junker family in Pomerania, Schlange attended a cadet academy and the University of Greifswald before serving as an officer in World War I, during which he was wounded several times.

== Political career ==
A monarchist and conservative, his political career began as a member of the Prussian Landtag for the DNVP first joining the body in 1920 and serving until 1928. He became chairman of the Pomeranian DNVP in 1924. Originally Schöningen was a more radical member of the DNVP; he supported the stab-in-the-back myth, was an avowed anti-semite, and supported dictatorship over the Weimar Republic. Starting in 1926 he gradually moderated his stance, by 1928 Schöningen was a member of the DNVP's more moderate faction by 1928 and had come to accept, though not support, the republic. This moderation led him to lose support among the Pomeranian DNVP and so he resigned from his position as their leader. The election of the more radical Alfred Hugenberg as party leader led him to defect and co-found the CNBLP in 1930.

Schöningen and the CNBLP joined Heinrich Brüning's minority government out of a fear of the Nazis until it collapsed on June 1, 1932. Due to his skill in operating his own estate, Schöningen was named Osthilfe Commissioner in November 1931 by the Agricultural Minister Martin Schiele. In this role he drafted a plan to resettle unemployed German workers onto small farms which would be created by breaking up bankrupt Junker estates. The Agricultural League labelled this plan "agrarian bolshevism" and President Hindenburg used to plan as a pretext to have to sack Brüning and his government in May 1932. During the Third Reich he initially refocused his efforts on his estate, bit later on he was he was involved in the resistance and was the prospective Minister of Food during the 20 July plot but managed to survive the war.

In 1945 Schöningen fled from his estate as the Red Army approached, he would never return, spending the rest of his life in Schleswig-Holstein. After World War 2 he immediately began involving himself in politics, in the summer of 1945 he founded the Christian Democratic Reconstruction Party which merged into the CDU in early 1946. On 1 February 1946, he appointed as head of food and agriculture in the British occupation zone, despite his lack of powers he successfully managed to build good relations between the British, the SPD, and his CDU. He also used heavy handed tactics to ensure that farmers delivered the required amount of agricultural goods. But as time went on it became clear that he had isolated himself, the left distrusted him as a former Junker, for his capitalism, and his hesitancy on land reform; while the right and farmers disliked his heavy handed approach.

He was a member of the German Bundestag from its first election in 1949 until 9 June 1950, in this role he advocated for a CDU-SPD Grand Coalition but this was unsuccessful and a right-wing coalition was formed that Schöningen did not participate in. He was considered the leading presidential candidate CDU politicians who didn't want to enforce Theodor Heuss but Konrad Adenauer lobbied the party to support Heuss, and Schöningen's chances at the presidency where destroyed when he began personally attacking Heuss. After these failures he left politics and served as German consul to the UK and then from 1953 to 1955 as ambassador. He was married with Margarete von Nagy (1890–1975) and had four children. His son Ernst-Siegfried Schlange-Schöningen (1914–2005) was German ambassador.

== Literature ==
- Herbst, Ludolf; Jahn, Bruno (2002). Vierhaus, Rudolf (ed.). Biographisches Handbuch der Mitglieder des Deutschen Bundestages. 1949–2002 [Biographical Handbook of the Members of the German Bundestag. 1949–2002] (in German). Munich: De Gruyter. p. 1715. ISBN 978-3-11-184511-1.
