= Munich East =

Federal electoral district of Germany

217 Munich East
- Electoral district for the Bundestag
- Munich East in 2025
- State: Bavaria
- Population: 391,400 (2019)
- Electorate: 242,591 (2021)
- Major settlements: Munich (partial)
- Area: 79.7 km^{2}

Current Electoral district
- Created: 1949
- Party: CSU
- Member: Wolfgang Stefinger
- Elected: 2013, 2017, 2021, 2025

Munich East (German: München-Ost) is an electoral constituency (German: Wahlkreis) represented in the Bundestag. It elects one member via first-past-the-post voting. Under the current constituency numbering system, it is designated as constituency 217. It is located in southern Bavaria, comprising the eastern part of the city of Munich.

Munich East was created for the inaugural 1949 federal election. Since 2013, it has been represented by Wolfgang Stefinger of the Christian Social Union (CSU).

== Geography ==
Munich East is located in southern Bavaria. As of the 2021 federal election, it comprises the boroughs of Altstadt-Lehel (1), Au-Haidhausen (5), Bogenhausen (13), Berg am Laim (14), Trudering-Riem (15), and Ramersdorf-Perlach (16) from the independent city of Munich.

== History ==
Munich East was created in 1949. In the 1949 election, it was Bavaria constituency 6 in the numbering system. In the 1953 through 1961 elections, it was number 201. In the 1965 through 1976 elections, it was number 206. In the 1980 through 1998 elections, it was number 205. In the 2002 and 2005 elections, it was number 220. In the 2009 and 2013 elections, it was number 219. In the 2017 and 2021 elections, it was number 218. From the 2025 election, it has been number 217.

Originally, the constituency comprised the boroughs of Berg am Laim, Bogenhausen, Giesing, Haidhausen, Harlaching, Perlach, Ramersdorf, Riem, and Trudering. In the 1965 through 1990 elections, it lost the boroughs of Giesing and Harlaching while gaining the borough of Au. In the 1994 election, it lost the boroughs of Au and Haidhausen. It acquired its current borders in the 2002 election.

Election	No.	Name	Borders
1949	6	München-Ost	Munich city (only Berg am Laim, Bogenhausen, Giesing, Haidhausen, Harlaching, Perlach, Ramersdorf, Riem, and Trudering boroughs)
1953	201	München-Ost	Munich city (only Berg am Laim, Bogenhausen, Giesing, Haidhausen, Harlaching, Perlach, Ramersdorf, Riem, and Trudering boroughs)
1957	201	München-Ost	Munich city (only Berg am Laim, Bogenhausen, Giesing, Haidhausen, Harlaching, Perlach, Ramersdorf, Riem, and Trudering boroughs)
1961	201	München-Ost	Munich city (only Berg am Laim, Bogenhausen, Giesing, Haidhausen, Harlaching, Perlach, Ramersdorf, Riem, and Trudering boroughs)
1965	206	München-Ost	Munich city (only Au, Berg am Laim, Bogenhausen, Haidhausen, Perlach, Ramersdorf, Riem, and Trudering boroughs)
1969	206	München-Ost	Munich city (only Au, Berg am Laim, Bogenhausen, Haidhausen, Perlach, Ramersdorf, Riem, and Trudering boroughs)
1972	206	München-Ost	Munich city (only Au, Berg am Laim, Bogenhausen, Haidhausen, Perlach, Ramersdorf, Riem, and Trudering boroughs)
1976	206	München-Ost	Munich city (only Au, Berg am Laim, Bogenhausen, Haidhausen, Perlach, Ramersdorf, Riem, and Trudering boroughs)
1980	205	München-Ost	Munich city (only Au, Berg am Laim, Bogenhausen, Haidhausen, Perlach, Ramersdorf, Riem, and Trudering boroughs)
1983	205	München-Ost	Munich city (only Au, Berg am Laim, Bogenhausen, Haidhausen, Perlach, Ramersdorf, Riem, and Trudering boroughs)
1987	205	München-Ost	Munich city (only Au, Berg am Laim, Bogenhausen, Haidhausen, Perlach, Ramersdorf, Riem, and Trudering boroughs)
1990	205	München-Ost	Munich city (only Au, Berg am Laim, Bogenhausen, Haidhausen, Perlach, Ramersdorf, Riem, and Trudering boroughs)
1994	205	München-Ost	Munich city (only Berg am Laim, Bogenhausen, Perlach, Ramersdorf, Riem, and Trudering boroughs)
1998	205	München-Ost	Munich city (only Berg am Laim, Bogenhausen, Perlach, Ramersdorf, Riem, and Trudering boroughs)
2002	220	München-Ost	Munich city (only Altstadt-Lehel (1), Au-Haidhausen (5), Bogenhausen (13), Berg am Laim (14), Trudering-Riem (15), and Ramersdorf-Perlach (16) boroughs)
2005	220	München-Ost	Munich city (only Altstadt-Lehel (1), Au-Haidhausen (5), Bogenhausen (13), Berg am Laim (14), Trudering-Riem (15), and Ramersdorf-Perlach (16) boroughs)
2009	219	München-Ost	Munich city (only Altstadt-Lehel (1), Au-Haidhausen (5), Bogenhausen (13), Berg am Laim (14), Trudering-Riem (15), and Ramersdorf-Perlach (16) boroughs)
2013	219	München-Ost	Munich city (only Altstadt-Lehel (1), Au-Haidhausen (5), Bogenhausen (13), Berg am Laim (14), Trudering-Riem (15), and Ramersdorf-Perlach (16) boroughs)
2017	218	München-Ost	Munich city (only Altstadt-Lehel (1), Au-Haidhausen (5), Bogenhausen (13), Berg am Laim (14), Trudering-Riem (15), and Ramersdorf-Perlach (16) boroughs)
2021	218	München-Ost	Munich city (only Altstadt-Lehel (1), Au-Haidhausen (5), Bogenhausen (13), Berg am Laim (14), Trudering-Riem (15), and Ramersdorf-Perlach (16) boroughs)
2025	217	München-Ost	Munich city (only Altstadt-Lehel (1), Au-Haidhausen (5), Bogenhausen (13), Berg am Laim (14), Trudering-Riem (15), and Ramersdorf-Perlach (16) boroughs)

== Members ==
The constituency was first represented by Franz Marx of the Social Democratic Party (SPD) from 1949 to 1953. Angelo Kramel of the Christian Social Union (CSU) was elected in 1953 and served a single term. Georg Lang of the CSU then served from 1957 to 1961. Former member Marx won the constituency in 1961 and served until 1972. He was succeeded by fellow SPD member Jürgen Vahlberg from 1972 to 1976. Rudolf Kraus won the constituency for the CSU in 1976, and served until 1990. Herbert Frankenhauser of the CSU was then representative from 1990 to 2013. Wolfgang Stefinger of the CSU was elected in 2013, and re-elected in 2017 and 2021.

Election	Member	Party	%
1949	Franz Marx	SPD	30.8
1953	Angelo Kramel	CSU	43.1
1957	Georg Lang	CSU	43.5
1961	Franz Marx	SPD	43.1
1965	Franz Marx	SPD	44.7
1969	Franz Marx	SPD	49.6
1972	Jürgen Vahlberg	SPD	50.9
1976	Rudolf Kraus	CSU	47.9
1980	Rudolf Kraus	CSU	44.8
1983	Rudolf Kraus	CSU	48.8
1987	Rudolf Kraus	CSU	46.2
1990	Herbert Frankenhauser	CSU	39.5
1994	Herbert Frankenhauser	CSU	48.3
1998	Herbert Frankenhauser	CSU	46.5
2002	Herbert Frankenhauser	CSU	45.3
2005	Herbert Frankenhauser	CSU	43.4
2009	Herbert Frankenhauser	CSU	36.4
2013	Wolfgang Stefinger	CSU	44.6
2017	Wolfgang Stefinger	CSU	36.8
2021	Wolfgang Stefinger	CSU	31.7
2025	Wolfgang Stefinger	CSU	36.3

== Election results ==
=== 2025 election ===
Federal election (2025): Munich East
Notes:	Blue background denotes the winner of the electorate vote. Pink background denotes a candidate elected from their party list. Yellow background denotes an electorate win by a list member, or other incumbent. A ✓ or ✗ denotes status of any incumbent, win or lose respectively.						
Party	Candidate	Votes	%	±%	Party votes	%	±%
CSU	✓ Wolfgang Stefinger	73.929	36.3	▲4.6	63,472	31.1	▲5.6
Greens	Andre Hermann	49,343	24.2	▲2.3	44,955	22.0	▼2.6
AfD	Tobias Teich	18438	9.1	▲4.9	19,672	9.6	▲5.0
SPD	David Rausch	31,514	15.5	▼4.3	30,928	15.1	▼3.5
Left	David Briels	12,464	6.1	▲3.5	17,133	8.4	▲4.7
FDP	Mahmut Türker	8250	4.0	▼5.3	12,795	6.3	▼7.8
Volt	Anna Schwarzmann	4,084	2.0	▲1.2	2,280	1.1	▲0.5
FW	Rolf-Peter Döll	3,648	1.8	▼0.48	2,488	1.2	▼1.4
PARTEI	Daniel Bittner	2,046	1.0	▲0.1	840	0.4	▼0.2
dieBasis				▼1.3	436	0.2	▼1.1
ÖDP				▼1.0	740	0.4	▼0.3
Tierschutzpartei				▼1.3	1,324	0.6	▼0.3
BSW					6,559	{{{party percent}}}	
Pirates							▼0.3
BP				▼0.3	208	0.1	▼0.1
Unabhängige							▼0.3
Humanists					182	0.1	▼0.0
Gesundheitsforschung							▼0.1
Bündnis C				▼0.1			▼0.1
BüSo				▼0.0			
MLPD					46	0.0	0.0
BD					133	0.1	0.0
Informal votes		1,063			588		
Total valid votes		203,716			204,191		
Turnout		204,779	84.0	▲4.1			
CSU hold	Majority			▲4.6			

=== 2021 election ===
Federal election (2021): Munich East
Notes:	Blue background denotes the winner of the electorate vote. Pink background denotes a candidate elected from their party list. Yellow background denotes an electorate win by a list member, or other incumbent. A ✓ or ✗ denotes status of any incumbent, win or lose respectively.						
Party	Candidate	Votes	%	±%	Party votes	%	±%
CSU	✓ Wolfgang Stefinger	61,159	31.7	▼5.1	49,286	25.5	▼5.9
Greens	Vaniessa Rashid	42,367	21.9	▲6.7	47,647	24.7	▲8.6
SPD	Claudia Tausend	38,243	19.8	▼1.5	36,106	18.7	▲2.7
FDP	Daniela Hauck	18,104	9.4	▲0.5	27,112	14.0	▼0.7
AfD	Wilfried Biedermann	8,066	4.2	▼3.3	8,978	4.6	▼3.9
FW	Martin Blasi	5,041	2.6	▲0.9	5,052	2.6	▲1.5
Left	Julian Zieglmaier	4,907	2.5	▼3.7	7,080	3.7	▼3.9
Team Todenhöfer	Jürgen Todenhöfer	2,526	1.3		1,724	0.9	
Tierschutzpartei	Kathrin Schmid	2,501	1.3		1,762	0.9	▲0.1
dieBasis	Roland Görög	2,432	1.3		2,450	1.3	
ÖDP	Rosa Marghescu	1,930	1.0	▼0.5	1,289	0.7	▼0.2
PARTEI	Oliver-Steve Skerlec	1,714	0.9		1,248	0.6	▼0.2
Independent	Simon Klopstock	1,650	0.9				
Volt	Lisa Meurer	1,630	0.8		1,252	0.6	
Pirates					654	0.3	▼0.1
BP	Mario Gafus	579	0.3	▼0.4	473	0.2	▼0.3
Unabhängige					239	0.1	
Humanists					201	0.1	
V-Partei3					169	0.1	▼0.1
Gesundheitsforschung					148	0.1	0.0
du.					121	0.1	
Bündnis C	Horst-Jürgen Wodarz	152	0.1		100	0.1	
BüSo	Sabine Zuse	51	0.0	▼0.1			
NPD					45	0.0	▼0.1
MLPD					35	0.0	0.0
DKP					35	0.0	0.0
The III. Path					33	0.0	
LKR					32	0.0	
Informal votes		906			687		
Total valid votes		193,052			193,271		
Turnout		193,958	80.0	▲1.8			
CSU hold	Majority	18,792	9.8	▼5.7			

=== 2017 election ===
Federal election (2017): Munich East
Notes:	Blue background denotes the winner of the electorate vote. Pink background denotes a candidate elected from their party list. Yellow background denotes an electorate win by a list member, or other incumbent. A ✓ or ✗ denotes status of any incumbent, win or lose respectively.						
Party	Candidate	Votes	%	±%	Party votes	%	±%
CSU	✓ Wolfgang Stefinger	68,255	36.8	▼7.9	58,483	31.4	▼8.1
SPD	Claudia Tausend	39,621	21.3	▼7.4	29,744	16.0	▼7.3
Greens	Margarete Bause	28,278	15.2	▲5.0	29,866	16.0	▲3.1
FDP	Manfred Krönauer	16,451	8.9	▲4.7	27,459	14.7	▲6.6
AfD	Wilfried Biedermann	13,822	7.4		15,959	8.6	▲3.9
Left	Brigitte Wolf	11,655	6.3	▲2.9	14,124	7.6	▲3.3
FW	Rudolf Schabl	3,223	1.7	▼1.2	2,111	1.1	▼0.4
PARTEI					1,576	0.8	
ÖDP	Glenn Giera	2,693	1.5	▼0.2	1,546	0.8	▼0.1
Tierschutzpartei					1,530	0.8	▲0.2
BP	Richard Progl	1,390	0.7	▼0.5	942	0.5	▼0.2
Pirates					787	0.4	▼1.8
DiB					563	0.3	
BGE					366	0.2	
V-Partei³					355	0.2	
DM					262	0.1	
Gesundheitsforschung					159	0.1	
NPD					158	0.1	▼0.3
MLPD					79	0.0	0.0
DKP					56	0.0	
BüSo	Erich Kaisersberger	299	0.2	0.0	43	0.0	0.0
Informal votes		1,226			745		
Total valid votes		185,687			186,168		
Turnout		186,913	78.2	▲6.8			
CSU hold	Majority	28,634	15.5	▼0.4			

=== 2013 election ===
Federal election (2013): Munich East
Notes:	Blue background denotes the winner of the electorate vote. Pink background denotes a candidate elected from their party list. Yellow background denotes an electorate win by a list member, or other incumbent. A ✓ or ✗ denotes status of any incumbent, win or lose respectively.						
Party	Candidate	Votes	%	±%	Party votes	%	±%
CSU	Wolfgang Stefinger	74,745	44.6	▲8.3	66,349	39.5	▲6.5
SPD	Claudia Tausend	48,051	28.7	▼2.1	39,187	23.3	▲4.4
Greens	Ulrike Goldstein	17,100	10.2	▼2.7	21,719	12.9	▼3.3
FDP	Manfred Krönauer	6,920	4.1	▼10.1	13,775	8.2	▼10.4
AfD					7,807	4.6	
Left	Oguz Lüle	5,713	3.4	▼2.0	7,131	4.2	▼2.3
FW	Stephanie Hentschel	4,978	3.0		2,600	1.5	
Pirates	Holger van Lengerich	3,757	2.2		3,814	2.3	▲0.1
ÖDP	Klaus Buchner	2,702	1.6	▲0.3	1,575	0.9	▲0.2
BP	Christa Philipp	2,080	1.2	▲0.3	1,235	0.7	▲0.1
Tierschutzpartei					1,124	0.7	0.0
NPD	Karl Richter	1,145	0.7	▼0.1	621	0.4	▼0.2
REP					297	0.2	▼0.1
DIE VIOLETTEN					210	0.1	▼0.1
DIE FRAUEN					206	0.1	
Party of Reason					146	0.1	
PRO					113	0.1	
RRP					47	0.0	▼0.8
BüSo	Erich Kaisersberger	249	0.1	0.0	45	0.0	0.0
MLPD					41	0.0	0.0
Informal votes		1,355			753		
Total valid votes		167,440			168,042		
Turnout		168,795	71.4	▼2.4			
CSU hold	Majority	26,694	15.9	▲6.1			

=== 2009 election ===
Federal election (2009): Munich East
Notes:	Blue background denotes the winner of the electorate vote. Pink background denotes a candidate elected from their party list. Yellow background denotes an electorate win by a list member, or other incumbent. A ✓ or ✗ denotes status of any incumbent, win or lose respectively.						
Party	Candidate	Votes	%	±%	Party votes	%	±%
CSU	✓ Herbert Frankenhauser	61,412	36.4	▼7.0	55,854	33.0	▼5.5
SPD	Claudia Tausend	44,917	26.6	▼9.7	32,109	19.0	▼9.6
FDP	Rainer Stinner	24,022	14.2	▲6.7	31,531	18.6	▲5.6
Greens	Ulrike Goldstein	21,722	12.9	▲4.5	27,466	16.2	▲2.6
Left	Nicole Gohlke	9,109	5.4	▲2.5	10,996	6.5	▲2.9
Pirates					3,715	2.2	
ÖDP	Günther Hartmann	2,147	1.3		1,283	0.8	
RRP	Joachim Ullrich	1,616	1.0		1,358	0.8	
Tierschutzpartei					1,099	0.6	
BP	Caroline Schwarz	1,574	0.9		1,079	0.6	▲0.3
NPD	Walter Böhm	1,286	0.8	▼0.2	1,038	0.6	0.0
Independent	Thomas Karcher	839	0.5				
FAMILIE					546	0.3	0.0
REP					439	0.3	▼0.2
DIE VIOLETTEN					352	0.2	
BüSo	Martin Hennig	221	0.1	▼0.5	127	0.1	▼0.1
PBC					106	0.1	0.0
CM					83	0.0	
DVU					74	0.0	
MLPD					51	0.0	0.0
Informal votes		1,469			1,028		
Total valid votes		168,865			169,306		
Turnout		170,334	73.7	▼3.9			
CSU hold	Majority	16,495	9.8	▲2.7			

=== 2005 election ===
Federal election (2005):Munich East
Notes:	Blue background denotes the winner of the electorate vote. Pink background denotes a candidate elected from their party list. Yellow background denotes an electorate win by a list member, or other incumbent. A ✓ or ✗ denotes status of any incumbent, win or lose respectively.						
Party	Candidate	Votes	%	±%	Party votes	%	±%
CSU	✓ Herbert Frankenhauser	73,067	43.4	▼1.9	65,031	38.5	▼7.4
SPD	Claudia Tausend	61,036	36.3	▼1.4	48,238	28.5	▼0.4
Greens	Ulrike Goldstein	14,060	8.4	▼0.4	23,001	13.6	▼1.7
FDP	Rainer Stinner	12,650	7.5	▲0.5	22.078	13.1	▲6.4
Left	Wolf Brigitte	4,833	2.9	▲1.9	6,158	3.6	▲2.5
NPD	Renate Werlberger	1,563	0.9		1,101	0.7	▲0.5
BüSo	Melanie Gatzke	1,089	0.6	▲0.3	245	0.1	▲0.1
GRAUEN					727	0.4	▲0.3
REP					716	0.4	0.0
BP					608	0.4	▲0.2
Familie					591	0.3	
Feminist					302	0.2	▲0.1
PBC					148	0.1	0.0
MLPD					76	0.0	
Informal votes		2,082			1,360		
Total valid votes		168,298			169,020		
Turnout		170,380	77.7	▼3.3			
CSU hold	Majority	12,031	7.1				
