= Karsten Voigt =

German politician (born 1941)

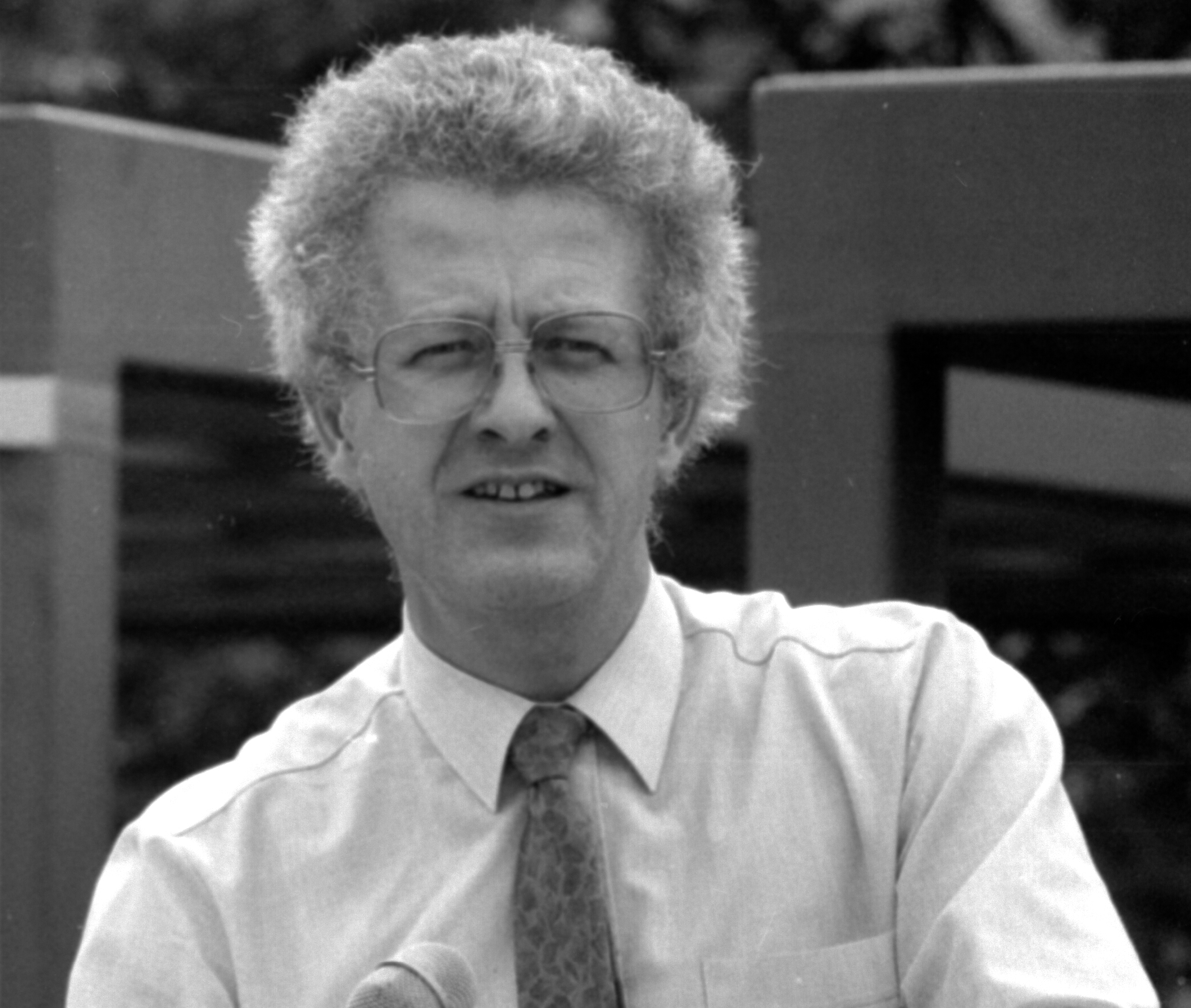
- Voigt in 1985

Member of the Bundestag; from Hesse
- In office 28 October 1976 – 26 October 1998
- Preceded by: Holger Börner
- Succeeded by: Multi-member district
- Constituency: Kassel (1976); Frankfurt am Main I – Main-Taunus (1976–1983); State list (1983–1998)

Personal details
- Born: Karsten Dietrich Voigt; 11 April 1941 (age 85) Elmshorn, Germany
- Party: Social Democratic
- Education: University of Hamburg; University of Copenhagen; Goethe University Frankfurt

Karsten Dietrich Voigt (born 11 April 1941) is a German politician of the Social Democratic Party (SPD).

== Early life and education ==
From 1960 to 1969, Voigt studied history, German, and Scandinavian languages and literature at the universities in Hamburg, Copenhagen, and Frankfurt.

== Political career ==
From 1969 until 1972, Voigt was chairman of the Jusos.

From 1976 to 1998, Voigt was a member of the German parliament, representing Frankfurt am Main I - Main-Taunus. In 1976, he was elected to the Bundestag for the first time. In 1983, the SPD parliamentary group made him their foreign policy spokesman; he held this office until leaving the parliament in 1998.

From 1999 to 2010, Voigt served as the "Coordinator of German-North American Cooperation" at the Foreign Office of Germany, under successive foreign ministers Joschka Fischer and Frank-Walter Steinmeier. He is a board member of the Atlantik-Brücke, an association which promotes German-American understanding.

== Other activities ==
- Checkpoint Charlie Foundation, Member of the Supervisory Board
- Einstein Forum, Member of the Board of Trustees
- Ernst Reuter Foundation, Member of the Board of Trustees
- German Council on Foreign Relations (DGAP), Member of the Steering Committee
- European Leadership Network (ELN), Senior Network Member

== See also ==
- Germany–United States relations
