= Gudrun Schaich-Walch =

German politician

Parliamentary State Secretary for the Ministry of Health
- In office 12 January 2001 – 22 October 2002
- Minister: Ulla Schmidt
- Preceded by: Christa Nickels
- Succeeded by: Marion Caspers-Merk; Franz Thönnes

Member of the Bundestag; from Hesse
- In office 20 December 1990 – 18 October 2005
- Preceded by: Multi-member district
- Succeeded by: Gregor Amann
- Constituency: State list (1990–1998); Frankfurt am Main II (1998–2002); Frankfurt am Main I (2002–2005)

Personal details
- Born: Gudrun Huppke; 20 August 1946 (age 80) Copenhagen, Denmark
- Party: Social Democratic
- Children: 1

Gudrun Schaich-Walch (born Gudrun Huppke; 20 August 1946) is a Danish-born retired German politician. As part of the First Schröder cabinet, she served as Parliamentary State Secretary in the Federal Ministry of Health from 2001 to 2002.
