= Herbert Frankenhauser =

German politician (1945–2020)

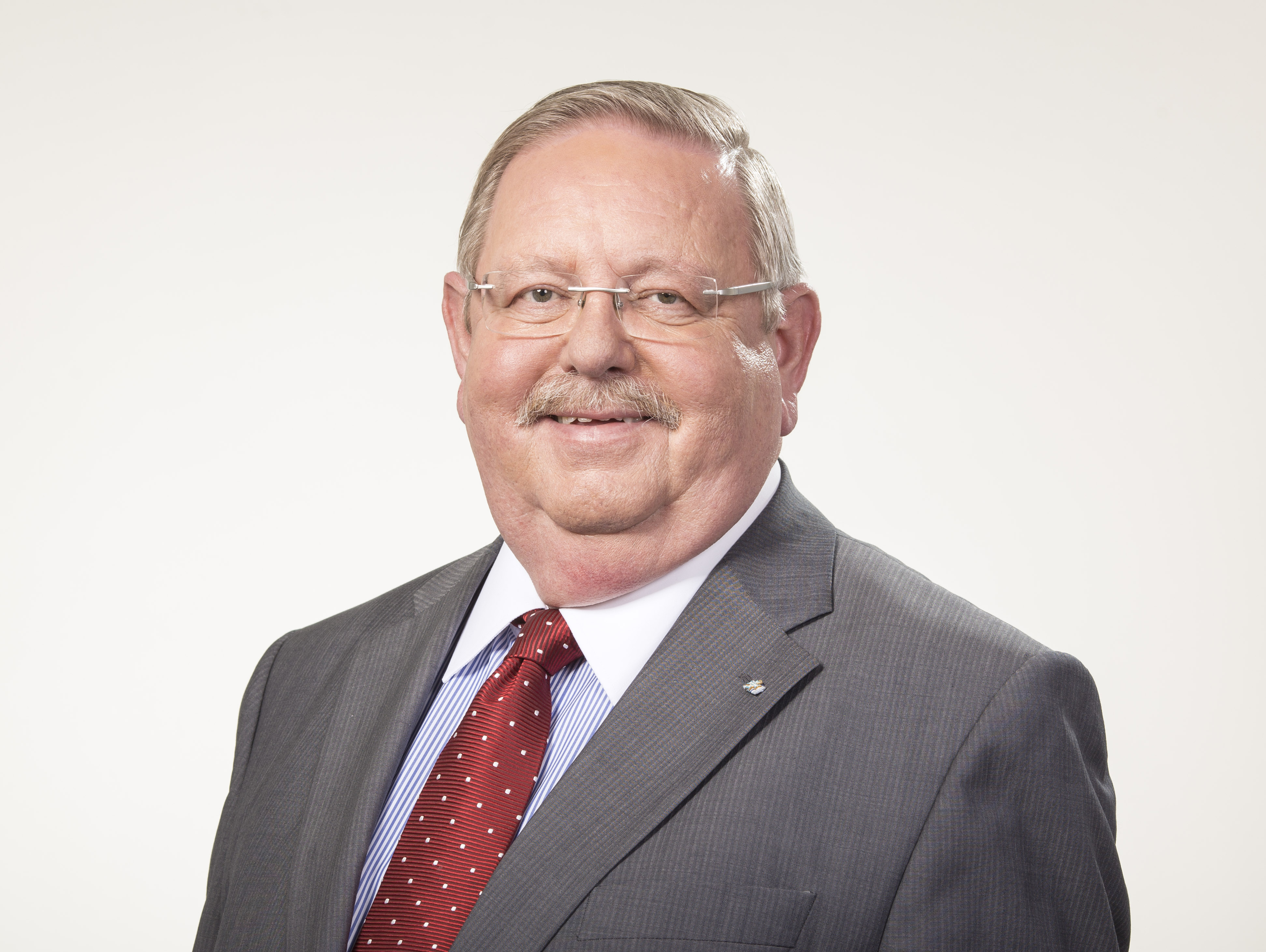
- Frankenhauser in 2012

Member of the Bundestag; for Munich East
- In office 20 December 1990 – 22 October 2013
- Preceded by: Rudolf Kraus
- Succeeded by: Wolfgang Stefinger

Personal details
- Born: 23 July 1945 Munich, Germany
- Died: 6 May 2020 (aged 74)
- Party: Christian Social Union
- Children: 1

Herbert Frankenhauser (23 July 1945 – 6 May 2020) was a German politician, born in Munich, Bavaria. He was a representative of the Christian Social Union in Bavaria and a member of the Bundestag.

== See also ==
- List of Bavarian Christian Social Union politicians
