= Claudia Tausend =

German politician

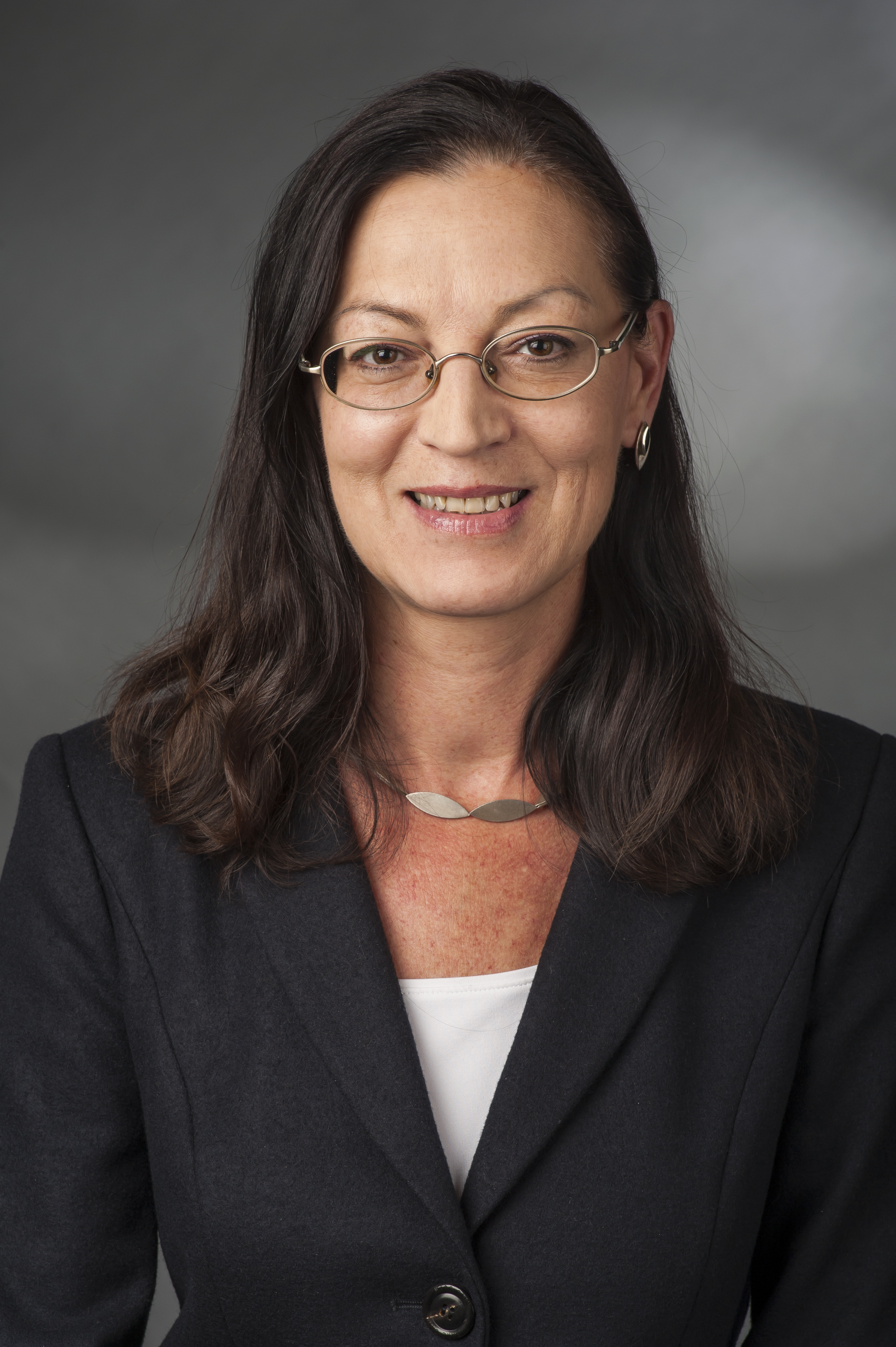
- Claudia Tausend in 2014

Member of the Bundestag
- Incumbent
- Assumed office 2013

Personal details
- Born: 22 July 1964 (age 61) Vilsbiburg, West Germany (now Germany)
- Party: SPD

Claudia Tausend (born 22 July 1964) is a German politician of the Social Democratic Party (SPD) who has been serving as a member of the Bundestag from the state of Bavaria since 2013.

== Early life ==
Tausend was born in Vilsbiburg, Bavaria,

== Career ==
Tausend first became a member of the Bundestag in the 2013 German federal election, representing the Munich East district. In parliament, she is a member of the Committee on Construction, Housing, Urban Development and Communities and the Committee on European Union Affairs.

In the negotiations to form a so-called traffic light coalition of the SPD, the Green Party and the FDP under Chancellor Olaf Scholz following the 2021 federal elections, Tausend was part of her party's delegation in the working group on building and housing, chaired by Kevin Kühnert, Christian Kühn and Daniel Föst.

Within the SPD parliamentary group, Tausend belongs to the Parliamentary Left, a left-wing movement. In 2024 she announced that she isn't seeking re-election for Bundestag.
