= Peter Horn (politician) =

German politician (1891–1967)

Member of the Bundestag; from Hesse
- In office 10 June 1950 – 19 October 1965
- Preceded by: Hans Schlange-Schöningen
- Succeeded by: Multi-member district
- Constituency: State list (1950–1953); Frankfurt/M I (1953–1961); State list (1961–1965)

Member of the Landtag of Hesse; for Wahlkreis XI
- In office 22 January 1950 – 30 June 1950
- Preceded by: August Oswalt
- Succeeded by: Charlotte Schiffler

Personal details
- Born: 15 April 1891 Cologne, Germany
- Died: 26 June 1967 (aged 76) Frankfurt, West Germany
- Party: Christian Democratic Union
- Children: 5

Peter Horn (15 April 1891 – 26 June 1967) was a German politician of the Christian Democratic Union (CDU) and former member of the German Bundestag.

== Political career ==
After 1945 Horn participated in the foundation of the CDU. From 1947 he was chairman of the Frankfurt am Main district association. Horn was a member of the Economic Council from 1947 to 1949, where he was Chairman of the Postal and Telecommunications Committee and Deputy Chairman of the CDU/CSU parliamentary group. In 1950 he was a member of the Hessian State Parliament for a few months.

Horn was a member of the German Bundestag from 10 June 1950, when he succeeded Hans Schlange-Schöningen, until 1965. In 1953 and 1957 he was elected to parliament in the constituency of Frankfurt I directly and in 1961 via the Hessian state list of his party.

== Literature ==
Herbst, Ludolf; Jahn, Bruno (2002). Vierhaus, Rudolf (ed.). Biographisches Handbuch der Mitglieder des Deutschen Bundestages. 1949–2002 [Biographical Handbook of the Members of the German Bundestag. 1949–2002] (in German). München: De Gruyter - De Gruyter Saur. p. 1715. ISBN 978-3-11-184511-1.
