= Deborah Düring =

German Green Party politician

Member of the Bundestag
- Incumbent
- Assumed office 2021

Personal details
- Born: 18 July 1994 (age 31) Munich, Germany
- Party: Alliance 90/The Greens

Deborah Saskia Düring (born 18 July 1994) is a German Alliance 90/The Greens politician who has been a member of the Bundestag for the state of Hesse since the 2021 German federal election.

== Early life and career ==
Born in Munich, Düring grew up in Wolnzach, Bavaria.

After graduating high school, Düring spent a voluntary social year working with indigenous communities in Costa Rica. She studied social science in Augsburg and spent a semester abroad in Lima, Peru. After completing her Bachelor's degree, including a dissertation on resource conflict, Düring began studying for a Master's degree in Peace and Conflict Research at Goethe University Frankfurt, TU Darmstadt and the Peace Research Institute Frankfurt.

From 2018 to 2020, Düring worked as a trainee at the state investment bank KfW in the field of development work.

== Political career ==
Early in her career, Düring held the position of speaker at the Green Youth in Augsburg. Since 2019, she has been speaker for the Green Youth in Hesse.

Since 2021, Düring has been a member of the Bundestag. In parliament, she has since been serving on the Committee on Economic Cooperation and Development and the Subcommittee on Global Health. She is also her parliamentary group’s spokesperson on development policy.

In addition to her committee assignments, Düring is part of the German Parliamentary Friendship Group for Relations with the States of Central America.

== Other activities ==
- GIZ, Member of the Board of Trustees (since 2022)

== Personal life ==
Düring lives in Frankfurt’s Bockenheim district. She is a vegetarian.
