= Achim Kessler =

German politician (born 1964)

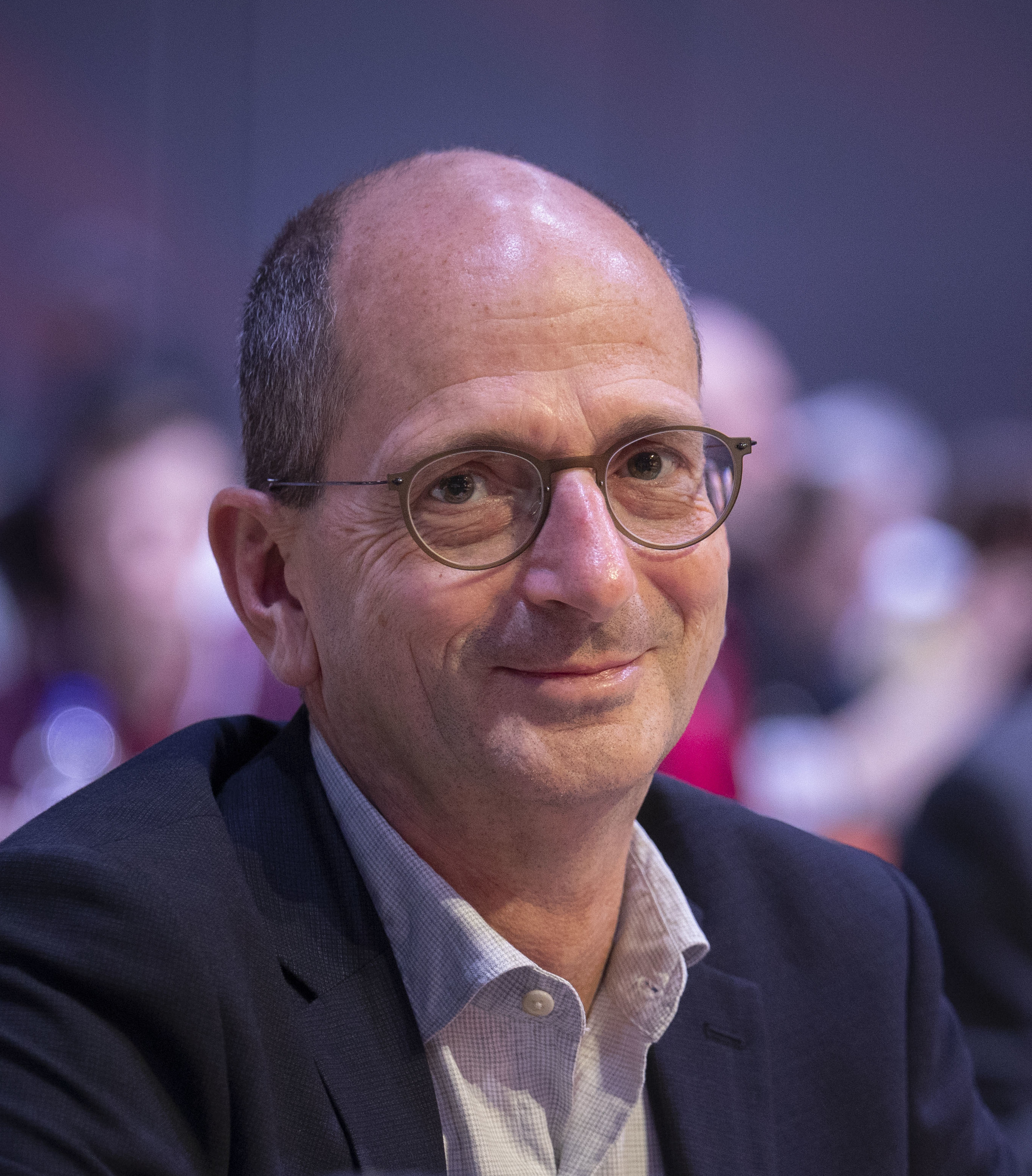
- Achim Kessler in 2019

Member of the Bundestag
- In office 2017–2021

Personal details
- Born: 2 August 1964 (age 61) Sankt Georgen im Schwarzwald, West Germany (now Germany)
- Party: The Left

Achim Kessler (born 2 August 1964) is a German politician. Born in Sankt Georgen im Schwarzwald, Baden-Württemberg, he represents The Left. Achim Kessler has served as a member of the Bundestag from the state of Hesse from 2017 to October 2021.

== Life ==
After his civilian service in the Workers' Welfare Association in Villingen-Schwenningen in 1986, he studied Modern German Literature and Media Studies as well as Economic and Social History in Marburg. Since 2005 he was a constituency employee of Wolfgang Gehrcke, member of the Bundestag. From 2006 to 2011, Kessler was an honorary city councilor of the city of Frankfurt. He became a member of the Bundestag after the 2017 German federal election. He is a member of the Health Committee. For his group he is spokesman for health policy.
