= Afrika-Verein der deutschen Wirtschaft =

German foreign business association founded in 1934

- Formation: 1934; 92 years ago
- Founded at: Hamburg
- Fields: International Trade, Foreign Policy, Geoeconomics
- Members: approx. 500 (2024)
- Key people: Sabine Dall'Omo, Chairperson; Christoph Kannengießer, CEO
- Staff: 18 (2024)
- Website: www.afrikaverein.de

The German-African Business Association (German: Afrika-Verein der deutschen Wirtschaft, AV) is an association and foreign trade organization aimed at promoting economic relations between Germany and the countries of Africa.

== Overview ==
The association's primary objectives include representing the interests of its member companies, organizing events, conferences, roundtables, and delegation trips, as well as providing information on economic and political developments related to Africa.

More than 100 events are organized annually in Germany and Africa. These include industry-specific forums such as the German-African Energy Forum, the German-African Agribusiness Forum, or the German-African Healthcare Forum. In addition, country-specific conferences like the German-Nigerian Business Forum or the Kenya Business Forum are held.

The association is one of the sponsors of the Sub-Saharan Africa Initiative of German Business (SAFRI), along with the German Chamber of Industry and Commerce (DIHK), the Federation of German Industries (BDI), and the Federation of German Wholesale, Foreign Trade, and Services (BGA). As such, it co-organizes the G20 Investment Summit Compact with Africa, which has been held annually since 2018.

Every year, the Afrika-Verein also organizes delegation trips for German companies to African countries. In 2023, these trips were conducted to Morocco, Senegal, Côte d'Ivoire, Kenya, Uganda, and Ghana. The association also maintains close contacts with the German federal government, African governments, embassies, as well as with associations and NGOs.

== History ==
In 1934, the association was registered as the Afrika-Verein Hamburg-Bremen. After the end of World War II, it had to temporarily suspend its activities but was able to resume operations in 1948. In the following years, the Bremen branch lost significance, leading to the association being renamed Afrika-Verein Hamburg In 2012, the Afrika-Verein opened its office in Berlin and relocated most of its staff to the capital. In 2021, the association moved its headquarters in Hamburg from Neuer Jungfernstieg 21 to Bleichenbrücke 9.

== Recent developments ==
As of 2024, the association had approximately 500 member companies. These include global corporations such as Robert Bosch GmbH, Volkswagen AG, Siemens, and Bayer AG, as well as banks like Commerzbank AG, Deutsche Bank and the development bank International Finance Corporation. However, the majority of members are small and medium-sized enterprises from the German Mittelstand. Additionally, institutional, non-profit members like the Konrad-Adenauer-Stiftung, the German Council on Foreign Relations and GIZ are part of the Afrika-Verein. The association has offices in Hamburg and Berlin.

The association has also launched initiatives such as indeed Africa! - The Young Business Network and Afrika-Verein Women in Power to support and network startups and women. The chairperson of the board has been Sabine Dall'Omo, CEO of Siemens South Africa, since April 2023. The role of chief executive officer has been held by Christoph Kannengießer since June 2012.
