= Bundesverband Großhandel, Außenhandel, Dienstleistungen =

The Bundesverband Großhandel, Außenhandel, Dienstleistungen e.V. (BGA), Federal Association of Wholesale, Foreign Trade, Services e.V., is a German umbrella organization of associations of these branches of industry based in Berlin. It was founded on March 29, 1949 by representatives of 40 associations as a general association of German wholesale and foreign trade. Today, the organization has almost 70 member associations and represents around 125,000 German companies with a sales volume of around EUR 1,000 billions.

It represents the interests of the German wholesale, foreign trade, and services sectors. The BGA supports its members in matters of professional, economic, and social policy. To this end, as with all lobbying associations, contacts with representatives of the Federal Government and the German Bundestag, as well as the Bundesrat, are indispensable.

The presidium is currently headed by its president Holger Bingmann and the association is managed by its CEO Gerhard Handke.
